= History of gardening =

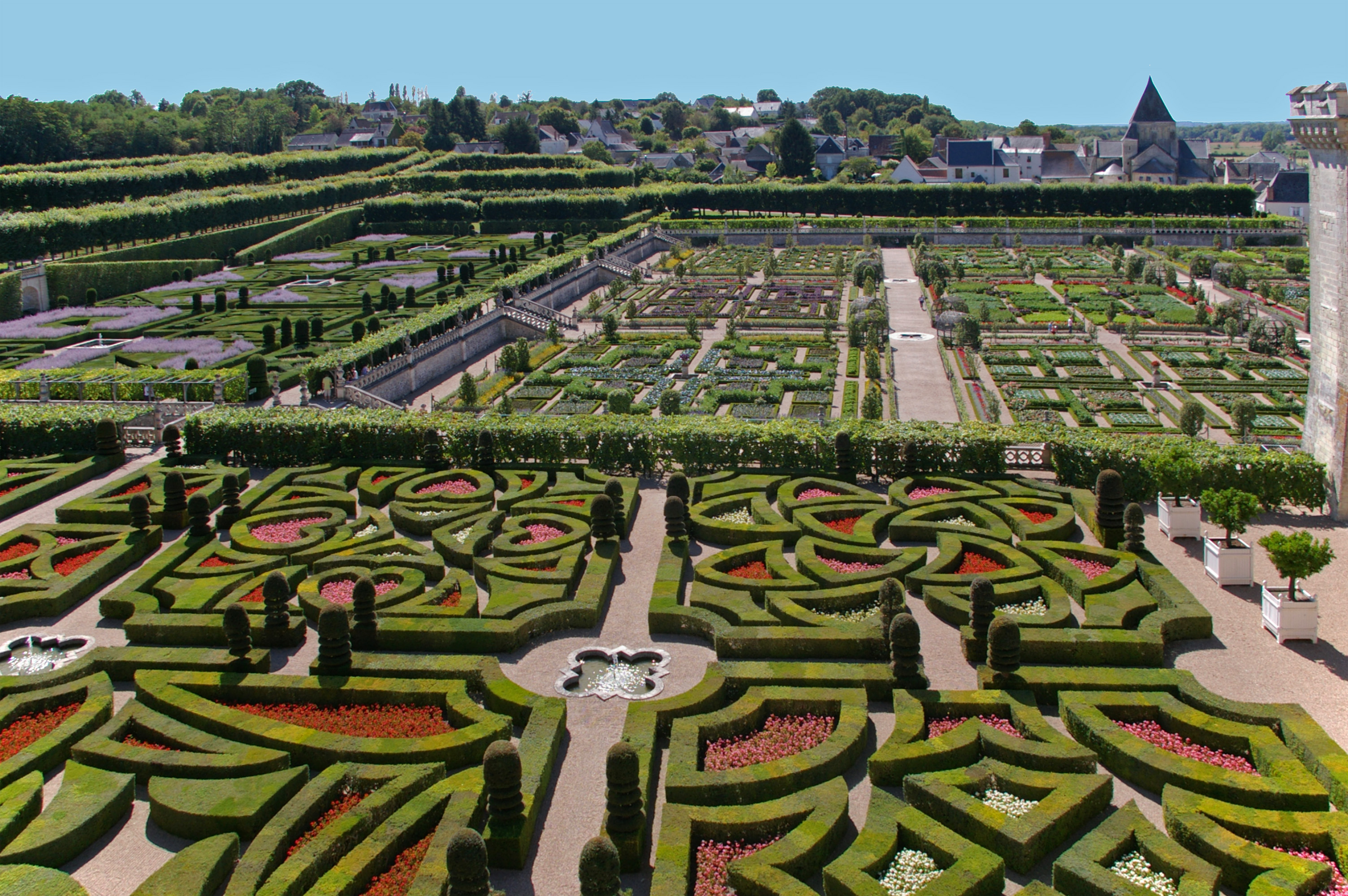
The Renaissance style gardens at Chateau Villandry

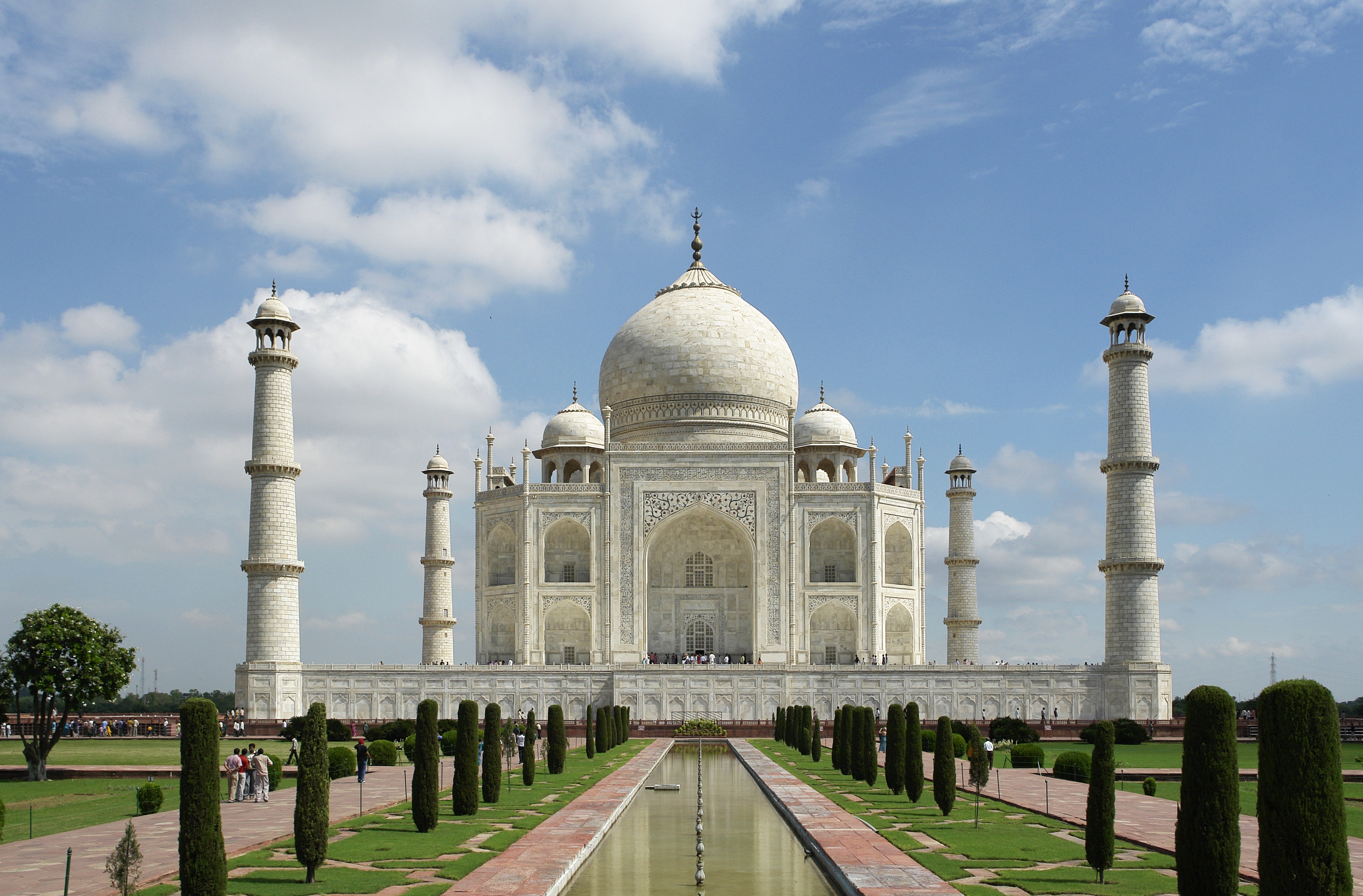
The Mughal and English-style garden leading to the Taj Mahal

The early history of gardening is largely entangled with the history of agriculture, with gardens that were mainly ornamental, generally the preserve of the elite until quite recent times. Smaller gardens generally had been a kitchen garden as their first priority, as is still often the case.

The broad traditions that have dominated gardening since ancient times include those of the Ancient Near East, which became the Islamic garden, the Mediterranean, which produced the Roman garden, hugely influencing later European gardening, and the Chinese garden and its development on the Japanese garden. While the basic gardening techniques were fairly well understood by trial and error from early on, the plants available in a particular location have changed enormously, especially in recent centuries. Many new groups of plants have been introduced from other parts of the world, and the ornamental plants now used are mostly cultivars bred to improve qualities such as colour, length of flowering, size and hardiness.

In Europe during the Renaissance, garden design was dominated by the Italian garden, which developed into the French formal garden, dominating the Baroque period. Both were formal styles, attempting to impose architectural principles on the garden. In the 18th century, the English landscape garden developed, apparently informal and natural, but requiring very large spaces, and by the end of the century dominated all Europe in the largest new gardens.

Gardening may be considered as aesthetic expressions of beauty through art and nature, a display of taste or style in civilized life, an expression of an individual's or culture's philosophy, and sometimes as a display of private status or national pride—in private and public landscapes.

== Introduction ==
The enclosure of outdoor space probably began around 10,000 BC. Historians imagine the first enclosure was a type of barrier used for excluding animals and marauders, perhaps beginning in West Asia, thereafter spreading to South and East Asia, and westward into Greece, and Europe. The modern words "garden" and "yard" are descendants of the Old English "geard", which denotes a fence or enclosure.

After the emergence of the first civilizations, wealthy citizens began creating gardens for purely aesthetic purposes. Egyptian tomb paintings of the 16th century BC are some of the earliest physical evidence of ornamental horticulture and landscape design depicting lotus ponds surrounded by symmetrical rows of acacias and palms. Another ancient tradition is of Persia: Darius the Great was said to have had a "paradise garden" and the Hanging Gardens of Babylon were renowned as one of the Seven Wonders of the Ancient World. Persian gardens were designed along a central axis of symmetry.

Persian influences extended to Hellenistic Greece after Alexander the Great. C. 350 BC there were gardens at the Academy of Athens, and Theophrastus, who wrote on botany, supposedly inherited a garden from Aristotle. Epicurus had a garden where he walked and taught, and he bequeathed it to Hermarchus of Mytilene. Alciphron also referenced private gardens in his writing.

The most influential ancient gardens in the western world were those of Ptolemy in Alexandria, Egypt, and the horticultural tradition that Lucullus brought to Rome. Wall paintings in Pompeii, Italy, attest to later elaborate development. The wealthiest Romans built extensive villa gardens with water features, including fountains and rivulets, topiary, roses, and shaded arcades. Archeological evidence survives at sites such as Hadrian's Villa.

Vitruvius, a Roman author and engineer, wrote the oldest extant design manual in 27 BC. De architectura libri decem (Ten Books on Architecture) addressed design theory, landscape architecture, engineering, water supply, and public projects, such as parks and squares. Vitruvius asserted that firmitas (firmness, durability, strength), utilitas (commodity, convenience, utility) and venustas (delight, loveliness, beauty) were the primary objectives of design. Some still consider these elements essential to quality design of landscape.

Byzantium and Moorish Spain continued horticultural traditions after the 4th century AD and the decline of Rome. By this time, a separate horticultural tradition formed in China, which was transmitted to Japan, where it developed into aristocratic gardens featuring miniaturized and simulated natural landscapes centered on ponds, and the severe Zen garden form featured at temples.

In Europe, the medieval garden developed slowly, perhaps with a particular revival in Languedoc and the Île-de-France in the 13th century. By the end of the period, an interest in ornamental gardens was well developed. The rediscovery of descriptions of antique Roman villas and gardens led to the creation of a new form of garden, the Italian Renaissance garden, in the late 15th and early 16th centuries. The Spanish Crown built the first public parks of this era in the 16th century, both in Europe and the Americas. The formal garden à la française, exemplified by the Gardens of Versailles, became the dominant horticultural style in Europe until the middle of the 18th century, when the English landscape garden and the French landscape garden acceded to dominance. In the 19th century, a welter of historical revivals and Romantic cottage-inspired gardening emerged. In England, William Robinson and Gertrude Jekyll were influential proponents of the wild garden and the perennial garden, respectively. Andrew Jackson Downing and Frederick Law Olmsted adapted European forms for North America, especially influencing the design of public parks, campuses and suburban landscapes. Olmsted's influence extended well into the 20th century.

The 20th century saw the influence of modernism in the garden: from the articulate clarity of Thomas Church to the bold colors and forms of the Brazilian Roberto Burle Marx.

Environmental consciousness and sustainable design practices, such as green roofs and rainwater harvesting, are becoming widely practiced as innovations in these fields continue to develop.

== The historical development of garden styles ==
=== Mesopotamian gardens ===
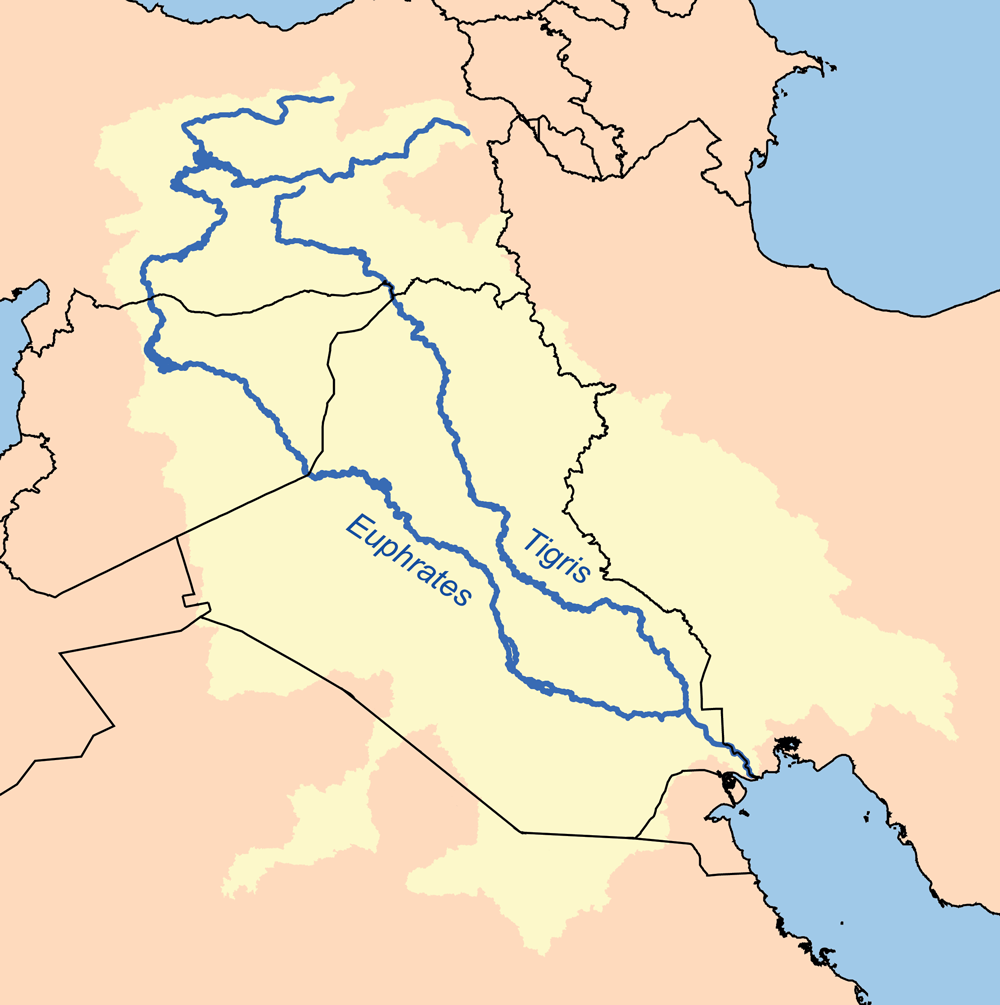
Map showing the Tigris and Euphrates Rivers

Mesopotamia, the "land between the Rivers" Tigris and Euphrates, comprises a hilly and mountainous northern area and a flat, alluvial south. Its peoples (Sumerians, Akkadians, Assyrians, and Babylonians) were urban and literate from about 3,000 BC. Evidence for their gardens comes from written texts, pictorial sculpture, and archaeology. In Western tradition, Mesopotamia was the location of the Garden of Eden and the Hanging Gardens of Babylon. Temple gardens developed from the representation of a sacred grove; several distinct styles of royal garden are also known.

The courtyard garden was enclosed by the walls of a palace, or on a larger scale was a cultivated place inside the city walls. At Mari on the Middle Euphrates (c. 1,800 BC), one of the huge palace courtyards was called the Court of the Palms in contemporary written records. It is crossed by raised walkways of baked brick; the king and his entourage would dine there. At Ugarit (c. 1,400 BC), there was a stone water basin, not located centrally as in later Persian gardens, for the central feature was probably a tree (date, palm, or tamarisk). The 7th century BC, Assyrian king Assurbanipal is shown on a sculpture feasting with his queen, reclining on a couch beneath an arbour of vines, attended by musicians. Trophies of conquest are on display, including the severed head of the king of Elam hanging from a fragrant pine branch. A Babylonian text from the same period is divided into sections, as if showing beds of soil with the names of medicinal, vegetable, and herbal plants written into each square, perhaps representing a parterre design.

On a larger scale, royal hunting parks were established to hold the exotic animals and plants which the king had acquired on his foreign campaigns. King Tiglath-Pileser I (c. 1,000 BC) lists horses, oxen, asses, deer of two types, gazelle and ibex, boasting "I numbered them like flocks of sheep."

From around 1,000 BC, the Assyrian kings developed a style of city garden incorporating a naturalistic layout, running water supplied from river headwaters, and exotic plants from their foreign campaigns. Assurnasirpal II (883–859 BC) lists pines of different kinds, cypresses and junipers of different kinds, almonds, dates, ebony, rosewood, olive, oak, tamarisk, walnut, terebinth and ash, fir pomegranate, pear, quince, fig and grapevines: "The canal water gushes from above into the gardens; fragrance pervades the walkways; streams of water as numerous as the stars of heaven flow in the pleasure garden ... Like a squirrel, I pick fruit in the garden of delights." The city garden reached its zenith with the palace design of Sennacherib (704–681 BC), whose water system stretched for 50 km into the hills, whose garden was higher and more ornate than any others, and who boasted of the complex technologies he deployed, calling his palace and garden "a wonder for all peoples".

The biblical Book of Genesis mentions the Tigris and Euphrates as two of the four rivers bounding the Garden of Eden. No specific place has been identified, although there are many theories.

The Hanging Gardens of Babylon are listed by classical Greek writers as one of the Seven Wonders of the World – places to see before you die. The excavated ruins of Babylon do not reveal any suitable evidence, which has led some scholars to suggest that they may have been purely legendary. Alternatively, the story may have originated from Sennacherib's garden in Nineveh.

=== Indian subcontinental gardens ===
Gardens in the Indian subcontinent appear in early literature, which mentions different types of gardens and methods to build them. Archeologically, the gardens at Sigiriya in Sri Lanka are the best-preserved water gardens in South Asia and are also one of the oldest landscaped gardens in the world.

==== Indian gardens ====
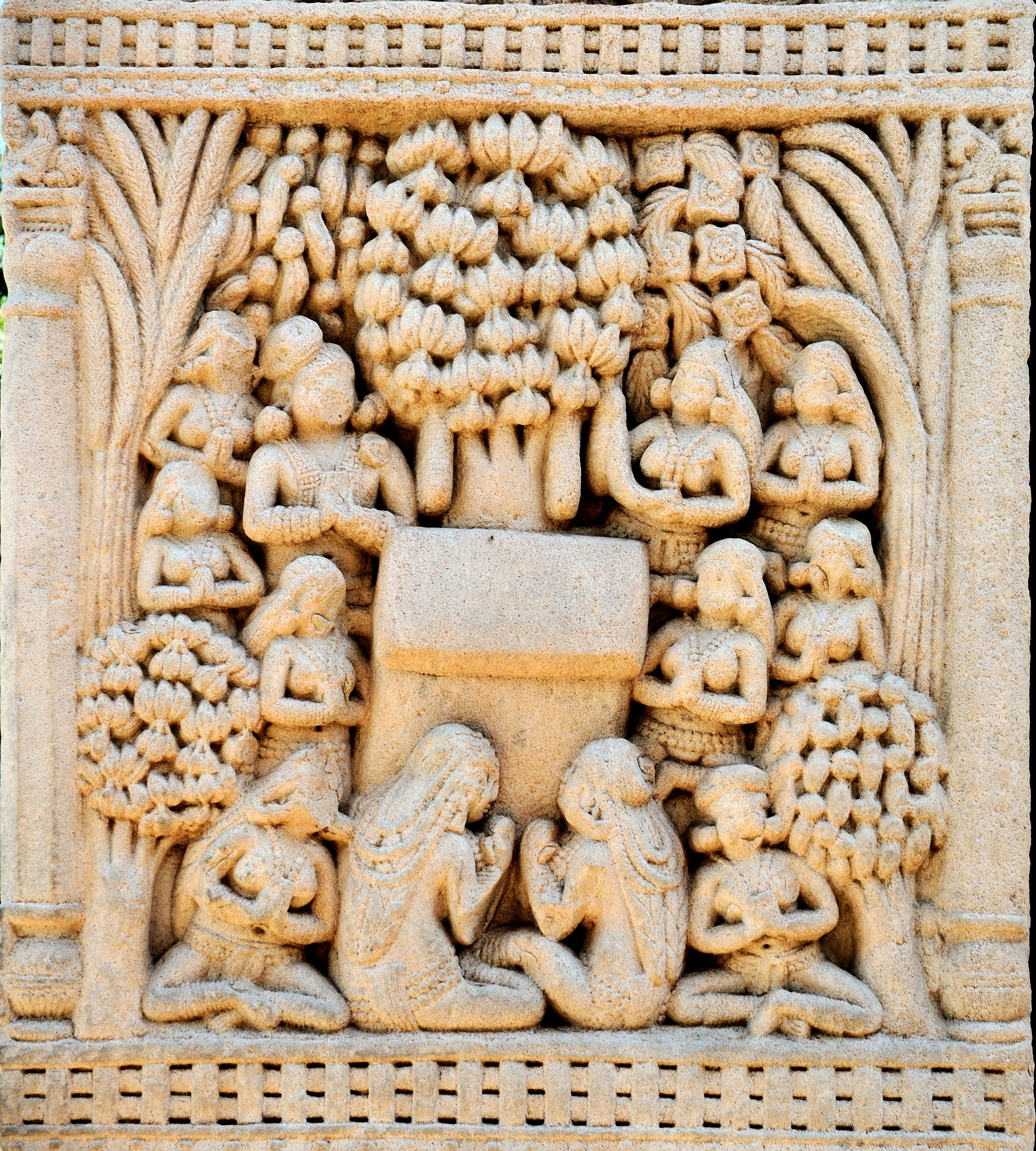
King Bimbisara of Magadha visits the Bamboo Garden (Venuvana) in Rajagriha; artwork from Sanchi.

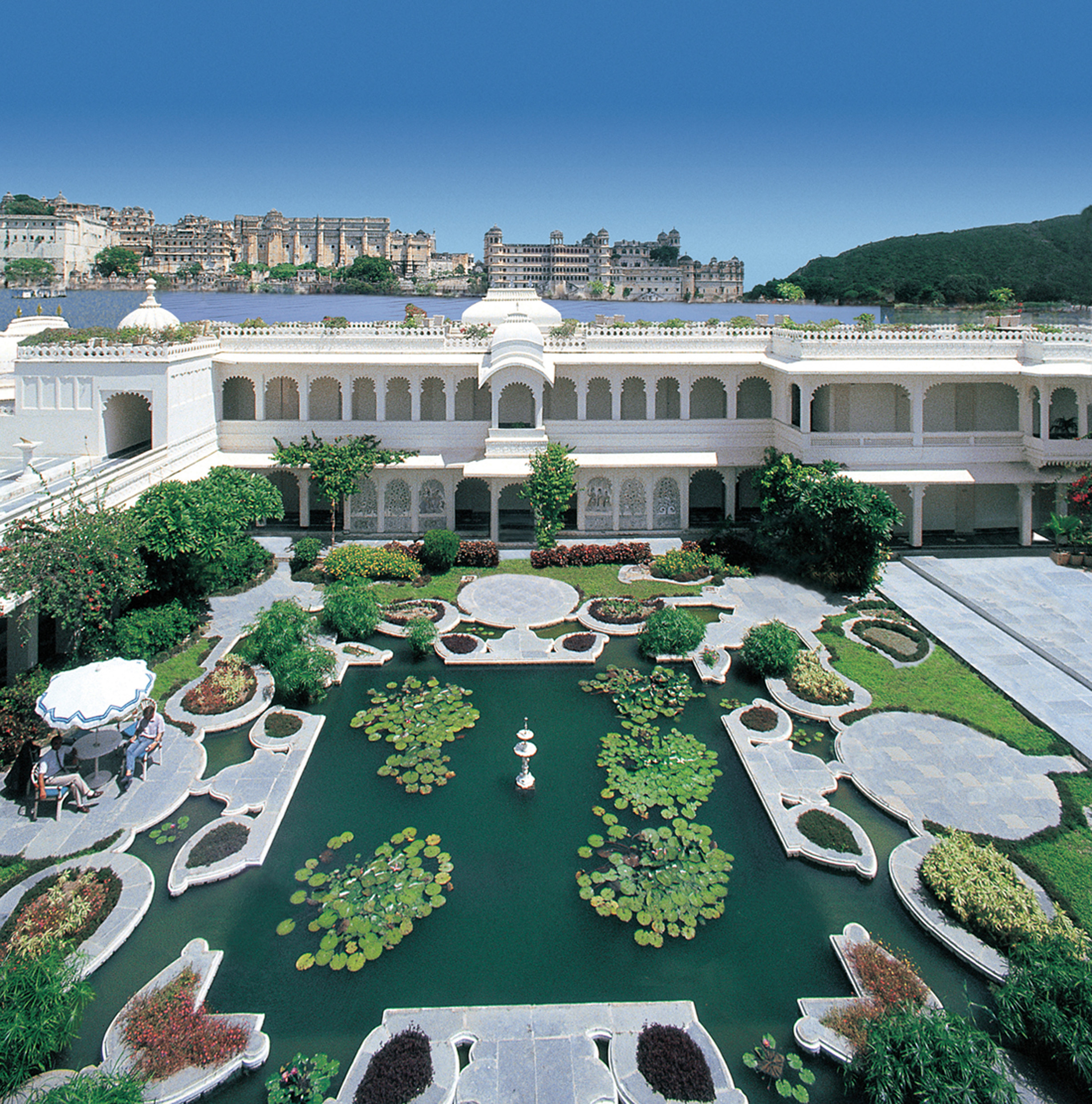
Water garden at Lake Palace

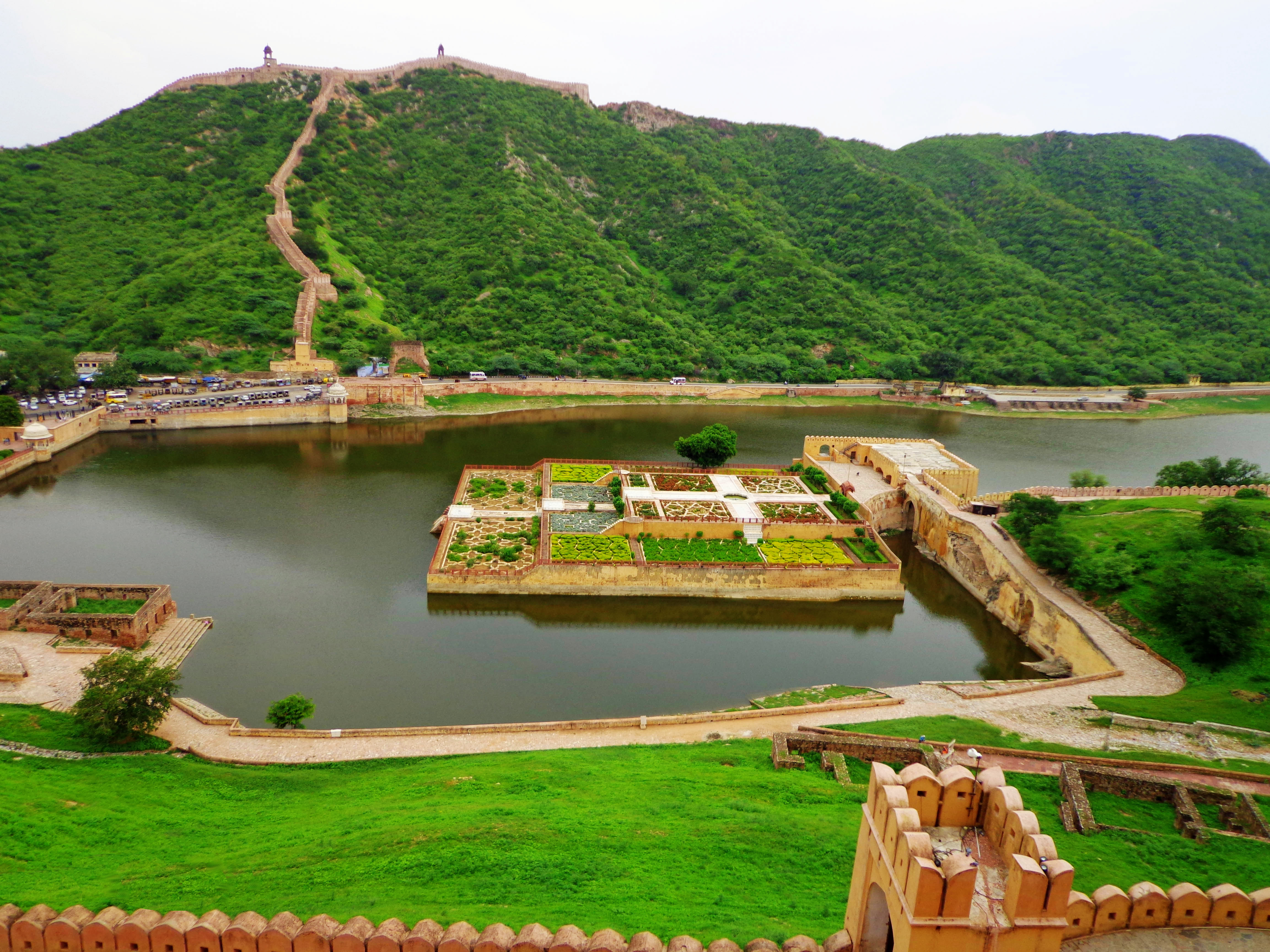
Moata Lake and Saffron Garden, exhibit ancient Indian garden styles

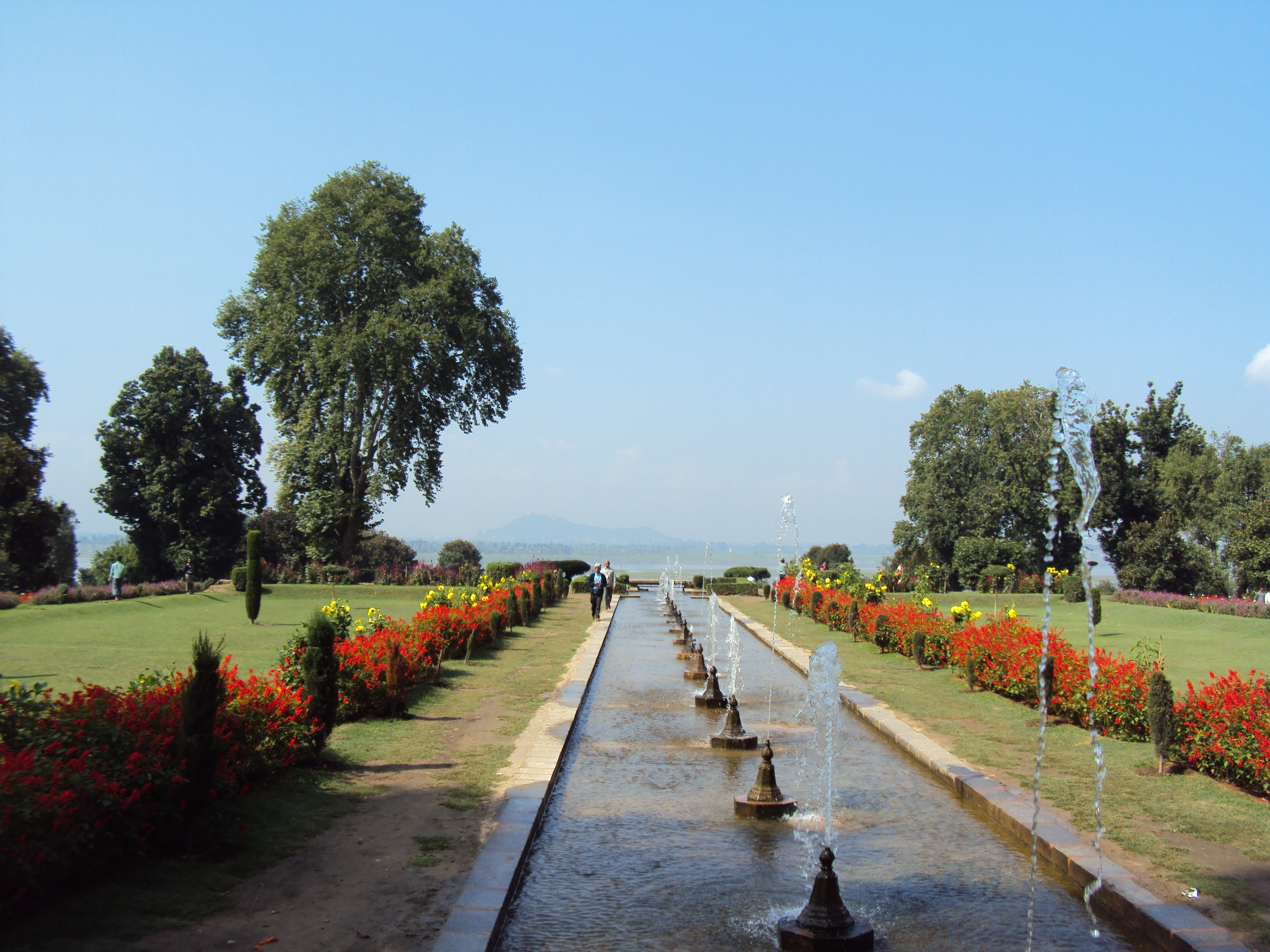
Shalimar Bagh, Srinagar, depicting a water way

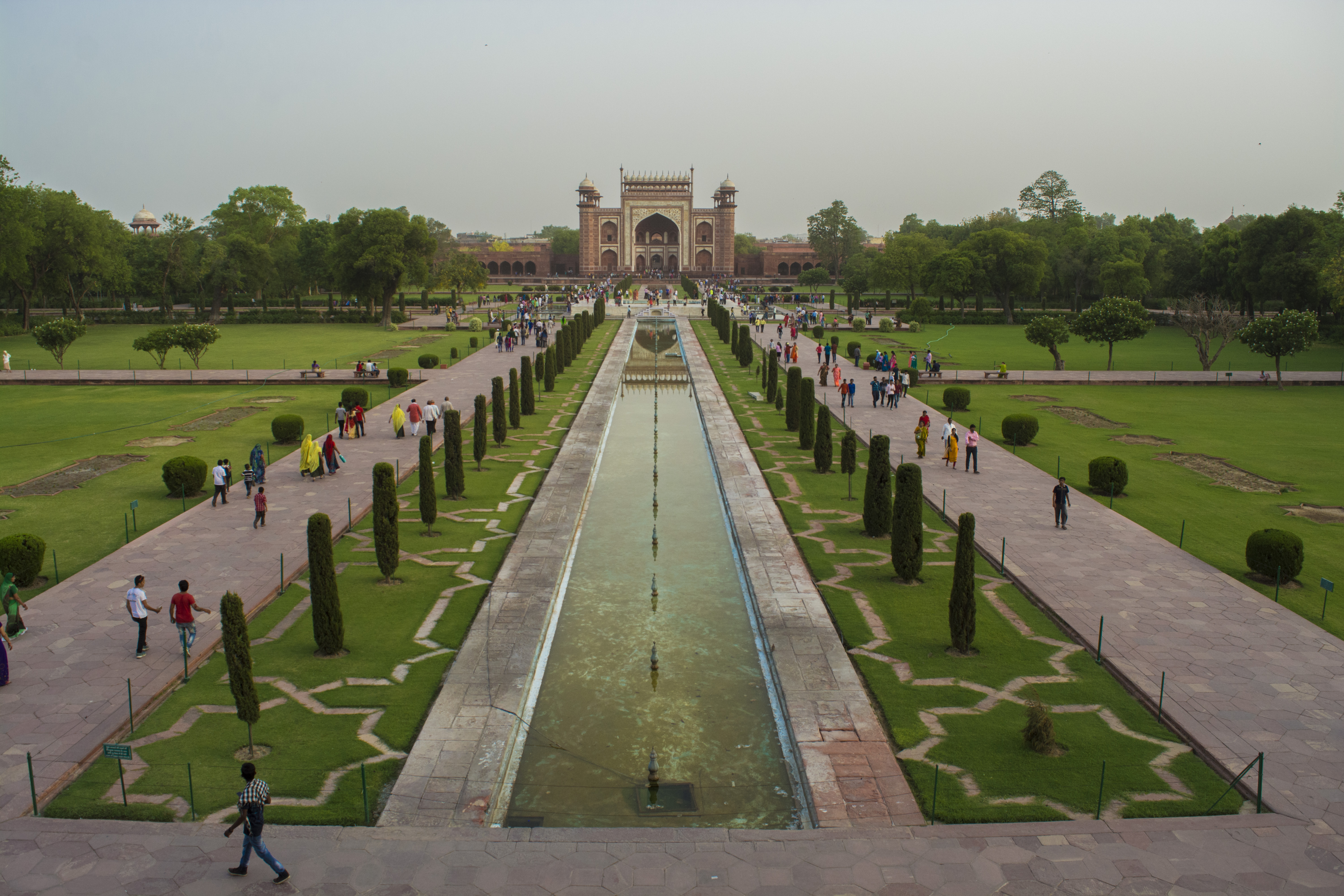
Mughal-style courtyard garden at Agra Fort

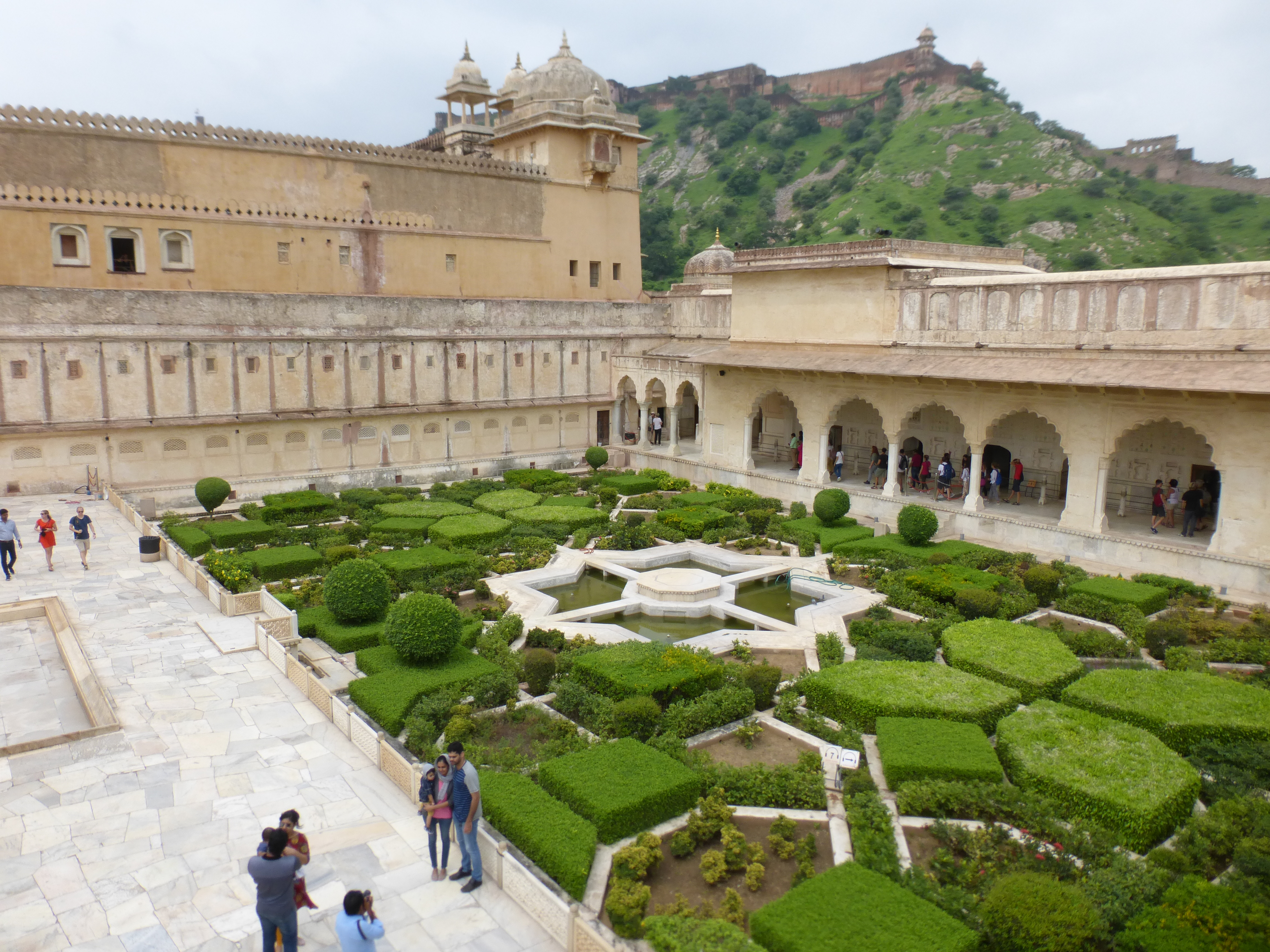
Hindu Rajput-style courtyard garden at Amer Fort

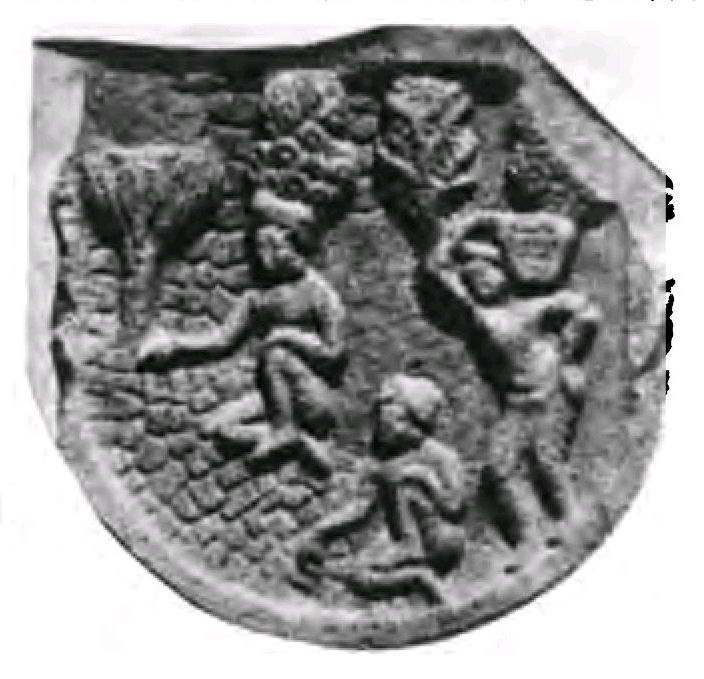
Gardeners gardening at Jetavana, Bodh Gaya, 2nd–1st centuries BC

Ancient Indian gardens are mentioned in several ancient Hindu texts including Rigveda, Ramayana, and Mahabharata. Buddhist accounts mention bamboo grove which was gifted by King Bimbisara to Buddha. Digha Nikaya, a Buddhist text, also mentions Buddha staying in the mango orchard of the Jivaka monastery, gifted by the physician Jivaka. Arama in Sanskrit means garden, and sangharama is a place where buddhist monk community lived in a garden like place. In Buddha's time, Vaishali was a prosperous and populous town full of parks and gardens and according to Lalit Vistara, it resembled a city of God. Emperor Ashoka's inscriptions mention the establishment of botanical gardens for planting medicinal herbs, plants, and trees. They contained pools of water, were laid in grid patterns, and normally had chattri pavilions with them. The Kama Sutra mentions details on house gardens and that a good wife should plant vegetables, bunches of sugarcane, clumps of the fig trees, mustard, parsley and fennel, various flowers like jasmine, rose and others likewise be planted and seats and arbours should be made and the middle of the garden should have a well, a tank or a pond, various other treatises also mention establishing lotus shaped baths, lakes, lotus-shaped seats, swings, roundabouts, Menageries. Chinese Buddhist pilgrim Xuanzang mentions accounts of Nalanda where "azure pool winds around the monasteries, adorned with the full-blown cups of the blue lotus; the dazzling red flowers of the lovely kanaka hang here and there, and outside groves of mango trees offer the inhabitants their dense and protective shade. There are accounts of four kinds of gardens in Ancient India: udyan, paramadodvana, vrikshavatika, and nandanavana. Vatika was a small garden inside homes. Margeshu vriksha was the practice of planting trees on the roadside for shade.

Manasollasa, a twelfth century text giving details on garden design, asserts that it should include rocks and raised mounds of summits, manicured with plants and trees of diverse varieties, artificial ponds, and flowing brooks. It describes the arrangement, the soils, the seeds, the distance between types of plants and trees, the methods of preparing manure, proper fertilizing and maintaining the garden, which plants and trees are best planted first, when to plant others, watering, signs of overwatering and underwatering, weeds, means of protecting the garden, and other details. Both public parks and woodland gardens are described, with about 40 types of trees recommended for the park in the Vana-krida chapter.

In medieval India, courtyard gardens are also essential elements of Mughal and Rajput palaces.

Indian text Shilparatna (16th century AD) states that Pushpavatika (flower garden or public park) should be located in the northern portion of the town. According to Kalidasa, a garden was elaborately laid out with tanks, arbors of creepers, seats (Kridasaila), mock hills, swings in bowers or in open, raised seats, or vedika under large shady tree. Arthashastra, sukraniti, and Kamandakanti mention public gardens which were situated outside the town and provided by the government where people would go and spend whole day in picnic, Panini mentions a kind of garden sport peculiar to eastern India (pracam kridayam), Salabhanjika was the activity of plucking sala flowers and spending the time in merry making. Upavan Vinoda chapter in Sharngadhara-paddhati (14th century AD) an encyclopediac work has been dedicated to horticulture and gardening. Indian gardens were also built around large water reservoirs or water tanks, which were also built along the river.

==== Sri Lankan gardens ====
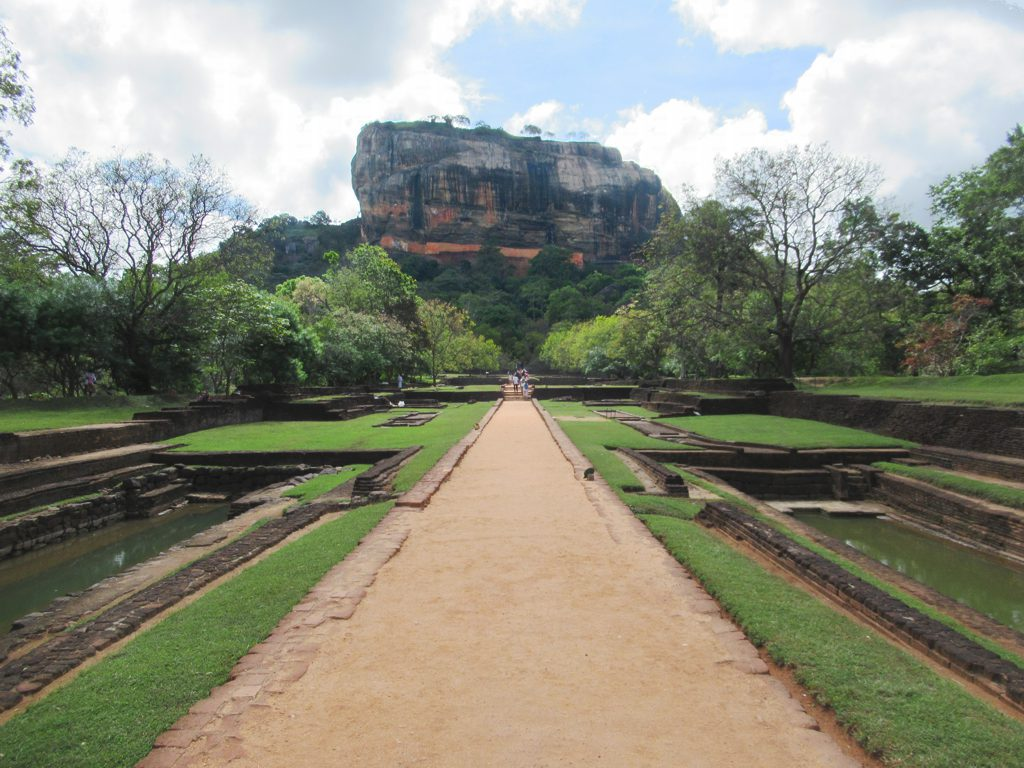
Sigirya gardens in Sri Lanka

The water gardens of Sigiriya can be seen in the central section of the western precinct. Three principal gardens are found here. The first garden consists of a plot surrounded by water. It is connected to the main precinct using four causeways, with gateways placed at the head of each causeway. This garden is built according to an ancient garden form known as char bagh, and is one of the oldest surviving models of this form.

The second contains two long, deep pools set on either side of the path. Two shallow, serpentine streams lead to these pools. Fountains made of circular limestone plates are placed here. Underground water conduits supply water to these fountains which are still functional, especially during the rainy season. Two large islands are located on either side of the second water garden. Summer palaces are built on the flattened surfaces of these islands. Two more islands are located farther to the north and the south. These islands are built in a manner similar to the island in the first water garden.

The third garden is situated on a higher level than the other two. It contains a large, octagonal pool with a raised podium on its northeast corner. The large brick and stone wall of the citadel is on the eastern edge of this garden.

The water gardens are built symmetrically on an east–west axis. They are connected with the outer moat on the west and the large artificial lake to the south of the Sigiriya rock. All the pools are also interlinked using an underground conduit network fed by the lake, and connected to the moats. A miniature water garden is located to the west of the first water garden, consisting of several small pools and watercourses. This recently discovered smaller garden appears to have been built after the Kashyapan period, possibly between the 10th and 13th centuries.

=== Persian gardens ===
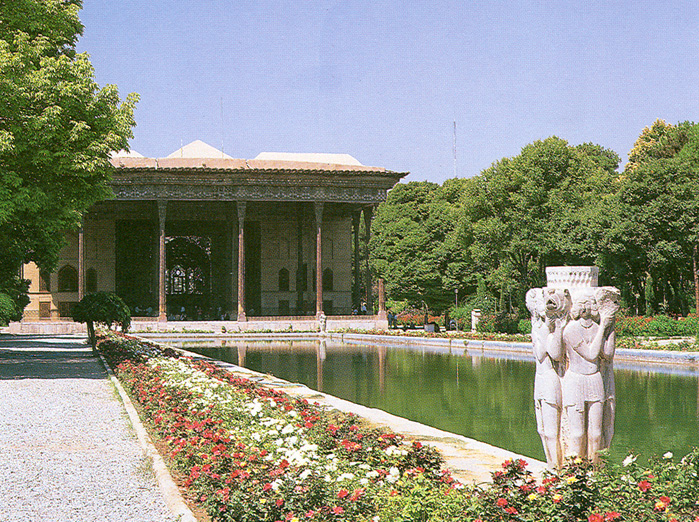
Persian-style Chehel Sotoun's garden

All Persian gardens, from the ancient to the high classical, were developed in opposition to the harsh and arid landscape of the Iranian Plateau. Unlike historical European gardens, which seemed carved or re-ordered from within their existing landscape, Persian gardens appeared as impossibilities. Their ethereal and delicate qualities emphasized their intrinsic contrast to the hostile environment. Trees and trellises largely feature as biotic shade; pavilions and walls are also structurally prominent in blocking the sun.

The heat also makes water important, both in the design and maintenance of the garden. Irrigation may be required, and may be provided via a form of tunnel called a qanat, that transports water from a local aquifer. Well-like structures then connect to the qanat, enabling the drawing of water. Alternatively, an animal-driven Persian well would draw water to the surface. Such wheel systems also moved water around surface water systems, such as those in the chahar bāgh style. Trees were often planted in a ditch called a juy, which prevented water evaporation and allowed the water quick access to the tree roots.

The Persian style often attempts to integrate indoors with outdoors through the connection of a surrounding garden with an inner courtyard. Designers often place architectural elements such as vaulted arches between the outer and interior areas to open up the divide between them.

=== Egyptian gardens ===
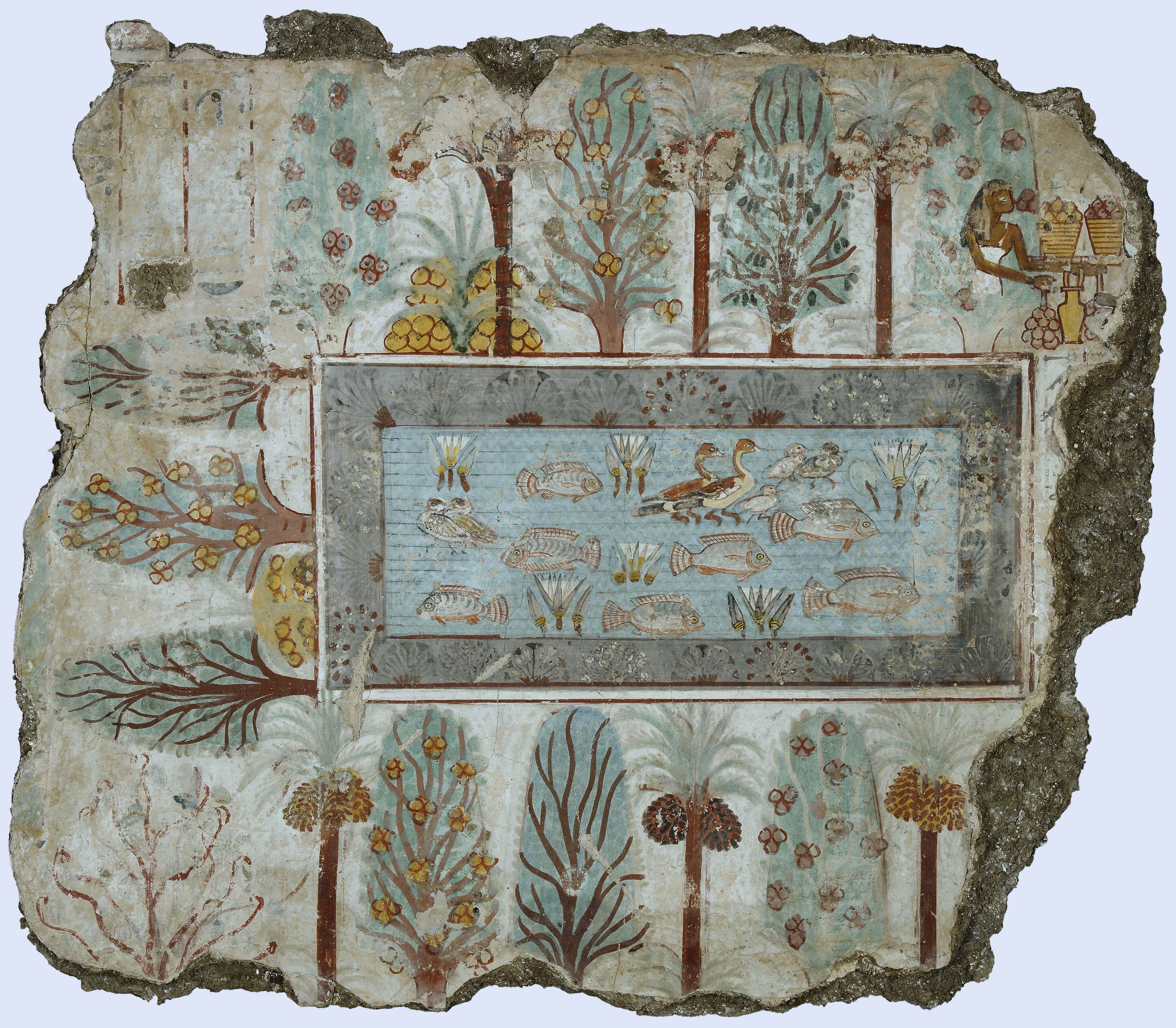
Rectangular fishpond with ducks and lotus planted round with date palms and fruit trees, in a fresco from the Tomb of Nebamun, Thebes, 18th dynasty

Gardens were much cherished in the Egyptian times and were kept both for secular purposes and attached to temple compounds. Gardens in private homes and villas before the New Kingdom were mostly used for growing vegetables and located close to a canal or the river. However, in the New Kingdom they were often surrounded by walls and their purpose incorporated pleasure and beauty besides utility. Garden produce made out an important part of foodstuff but flowers were also cultivated for use in garlands to wear at festive occasions and for medicinal purposes. While the poor kept a patch for growing vegetables, the rich people could afford gardens lined with sheltering trees and decorative pools with fish and waterfowl. There could be wooden structures forming pergolas to support vines of grapes from which raisins and wine were produced. There could even be elaborate stone kiosks for ornamental reasons, with decorative statues.

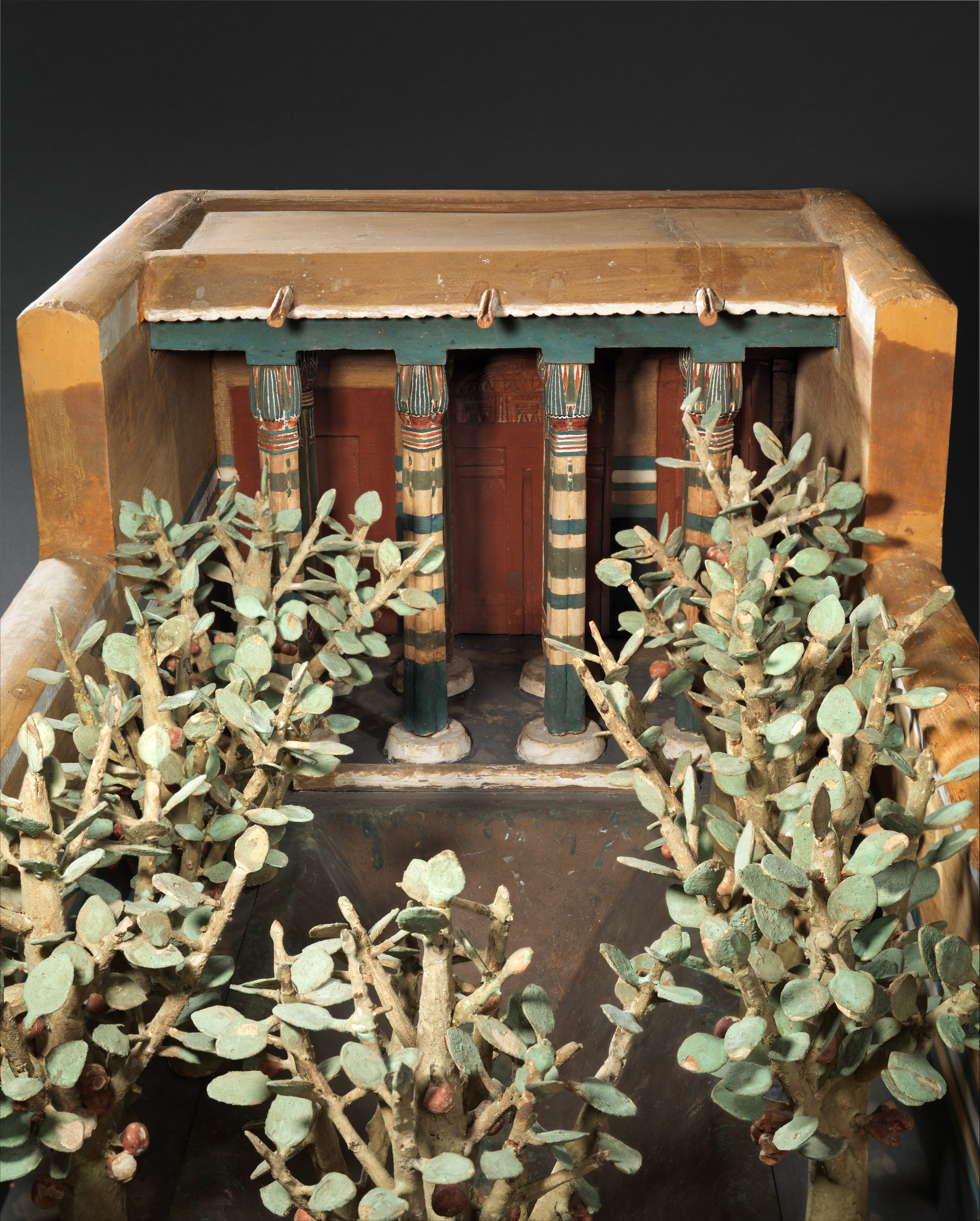
A funerary model of a garden, dating to the Eleventh dynasty of Egypt, c. 2009–1998 BC. Made of painted and gessoed wood, originally from Thebes.

Temple gardens had plots for cultivating special vegetables, plants or herbs considered sacred to a certain deity and which were required in rituals and offerings like lettuce to Min. Sacred groves and ornamental trees were planted in front of or near both cult temples and mortuary temples. As temples were representations of heaven and built as the actual home of the god, gardens were laid out according to the same principle. Avenues leading up to the entrance could be lined with trees, courtyards could hold small gardens and between temple buildings gardens with trees, vineyards, flowers and ponds were maintained.

The ancient Egyptian garden would have looked different from a modern garden. It would have seemed more like a collection of herbs or a patch of wild flowers, lacking the specially bred flowers of today. Flowers like the iris, chrysanthemum, lily, and delphinium (blue), were certainly known to the ancients, but were not featured much in garden scenes. Formal bosquets seem to have been composed of mandrake, poppy, cornflower, and/or lotus and papyrus.

Due to the arid climate of Egypt, tending gardens meant constant attention and depended on irrigation. Skilled gardeners were employed by temples and households of the wealthy. Duties included planting, weeding, watering by means of a shadoof, pruning of fruit trees, digging the ground, and harvesting the fruit.

=== Hellenistic and Roman gardens ===
==== Hellenistic gardens ====
It is curious that although the Egyptians and Romans both gardened with vigor, the Greeks did not own private gardens. They did put gardens around temples, and they adorned walkways and roads with statues, but the ornate and pleasure gardens that demonstrated wealth in the other communities is seemingly absent.

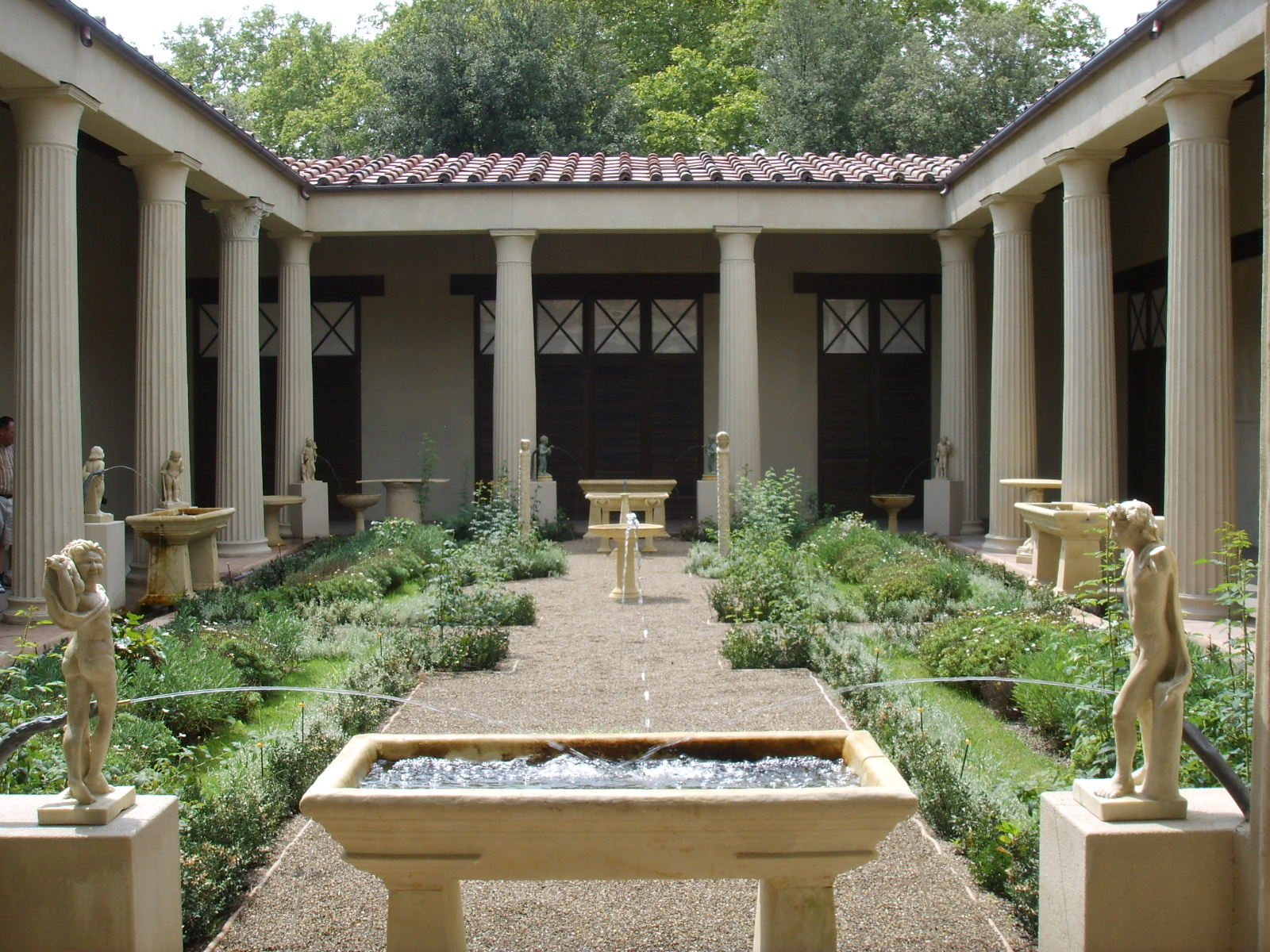
Reconstruction of the Roman garden of the House of the Vettii in Pompeii

==== Roman gardens ====
Roman gardens were a place of peace and solitude, a refuge from urban life. Gaius Maecenas, a culturally influential confidante of the emperor Augustus, built the first private garden estate of Rome to fulfill his creative ambitions and restore his delicate health. Seneca the Younger characterized the gardens' immersive blend of art, nature, and water as having "diverted his worried mind with the sound of rippling waters."

Ornamental horticulture became highly developed during the development of Roman civilization. The administrators of the Roman Empire (c. 100 BC – 500 AD) actively exchanged information on agriculture, horticulture, animal husbandry, hydraulics, and botany. Seeds and plants were widely shared. The Gardens of Lucullus (Horti Lucullani) on the Pincian Hill on the edge of Rome introduced the Persian garden to Europe in about 60 BC.

=== Chinese and Japanese gardens ===
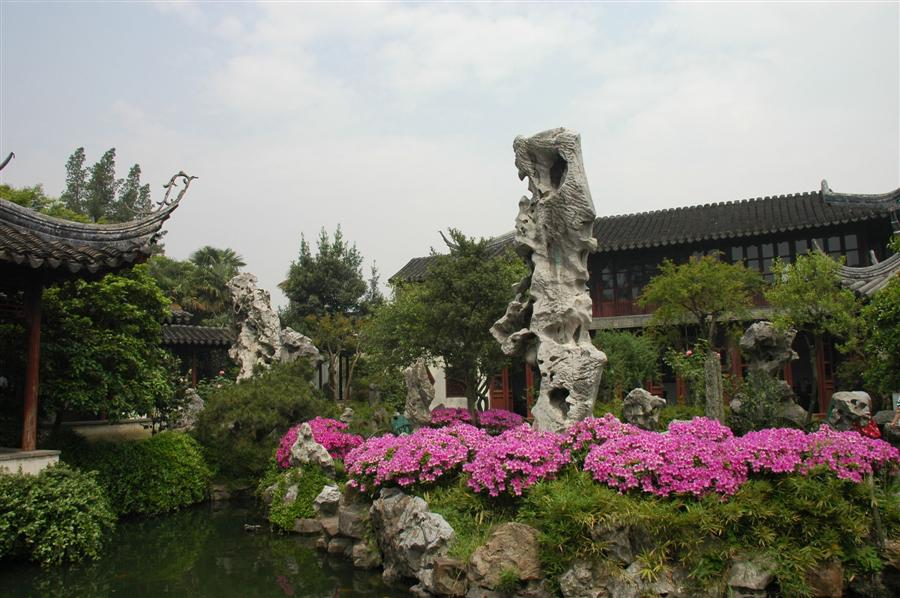
Rock sculpture from the 'Lingering Garden' of Suzhou, China

Both Chinese and Japanese garden design traditionally is intended to evoke the natural landscape of mountains and rivers. However, the intended viewpoint of the gardens differs: Chinese gardens were intended to be viewed from within the garden and are intended as a setting for everyday life. Japanese gardens, with a few exceptions, were intended to be viewed from within the house, somewhat like a diorama. Moreover, Chinese gardens often included a water feature, while Japanese gardens, set in a wetter climate, would often get by with the suggestion of water (such as sand or pebbles raked into a wave pattern).

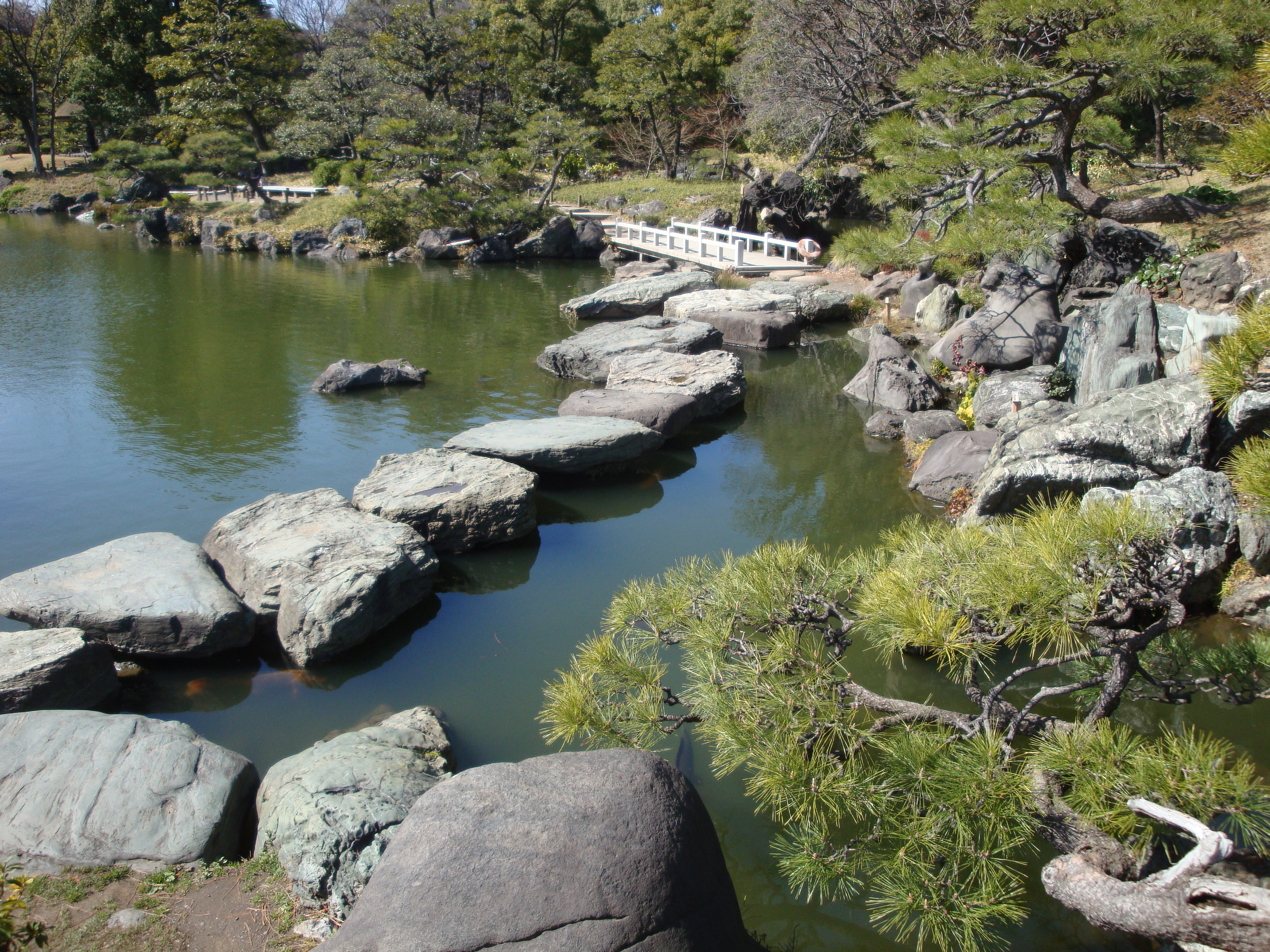
Stepping stones in Kiyosumi Garden, in Fukagawa, Tokyo

Traditional Chinese gardens are also more likely to treat the plants in a naturalistic way, while traditional Japanese gardens might feature plants sheared into mountain or cloud shapes. This contrasts with the handling of stone elements: in a Japanese garden, stepping stones are placed in groupings as part of the landscape, but in a Chinese garden, a particularly choice stone might even be placed on a pedestal in a prominent location so that it might be more easily appreciated.

==== Chinese scholar gardens ====
The style of Chinese garden varies among economic groups and differs by dynasties. Rocks, water, bridges, and pavilions are among the most common features of scholar gardens for the wealthy classes, while courtyards, wells, and terra cotta fish tanks are common among the general population. Other features such as moon gates and leaky windows (openwork screens that pierce surrounding walls) are seen in both groups.

The development of landscape design in China was historically driven by philosophies of both Confucianism and Taoism. Geometric symmetry and reinforcement of class boundaries were typical characteristics of landscape design in Asian cities, and both characteristics reflect Confucian ideals. While the British used nature outside the home to provide privacy, Chinese homes were compounds made of a number of buildings which all faced one or more courtyards or common areas. Rather than around the home, the Chinese valued natural spaces inside the compound, which is where the family socialized. Furthermore, Courtyards in the Chinese home reflected Taoist philosophies, where families would try to create abstractions of nature rather than recreations of it. For example, a Taoist garden would avoid straight lines and use stone and water instead of trees, whereas Asian cities followed Confucian, geometric designs and North American parks typically feature trees and lawns.

There are two ways of looking at the signature design characteristics of the Chinese garden: first; the concept of Yin and Yang, and second; the myths of longevity that arose during the Qin dynasty.

The philosophy of Yin and Yang portrays the idea of balance and harmony. The Chinese garden expresses the relationship to nature and the idea of balance through the art of mimicking natural setting, thus the existence of mountains, rocks, water, and wind elements. Yin and Yang juxtapose complementary opposites: as hard as rock can be, the softness of water can dissolve it. Lake Tai rocks, limestone eroded by the water of Lake Tai, are the quintessential example. Water, air, and light run through the rock as it sits still on display. The leaky windows of the Chinese garden wall portray both steadiness and movement. The windows create a solid painting on walls, however, that steadiness changes once the wind blows or the eyes move.

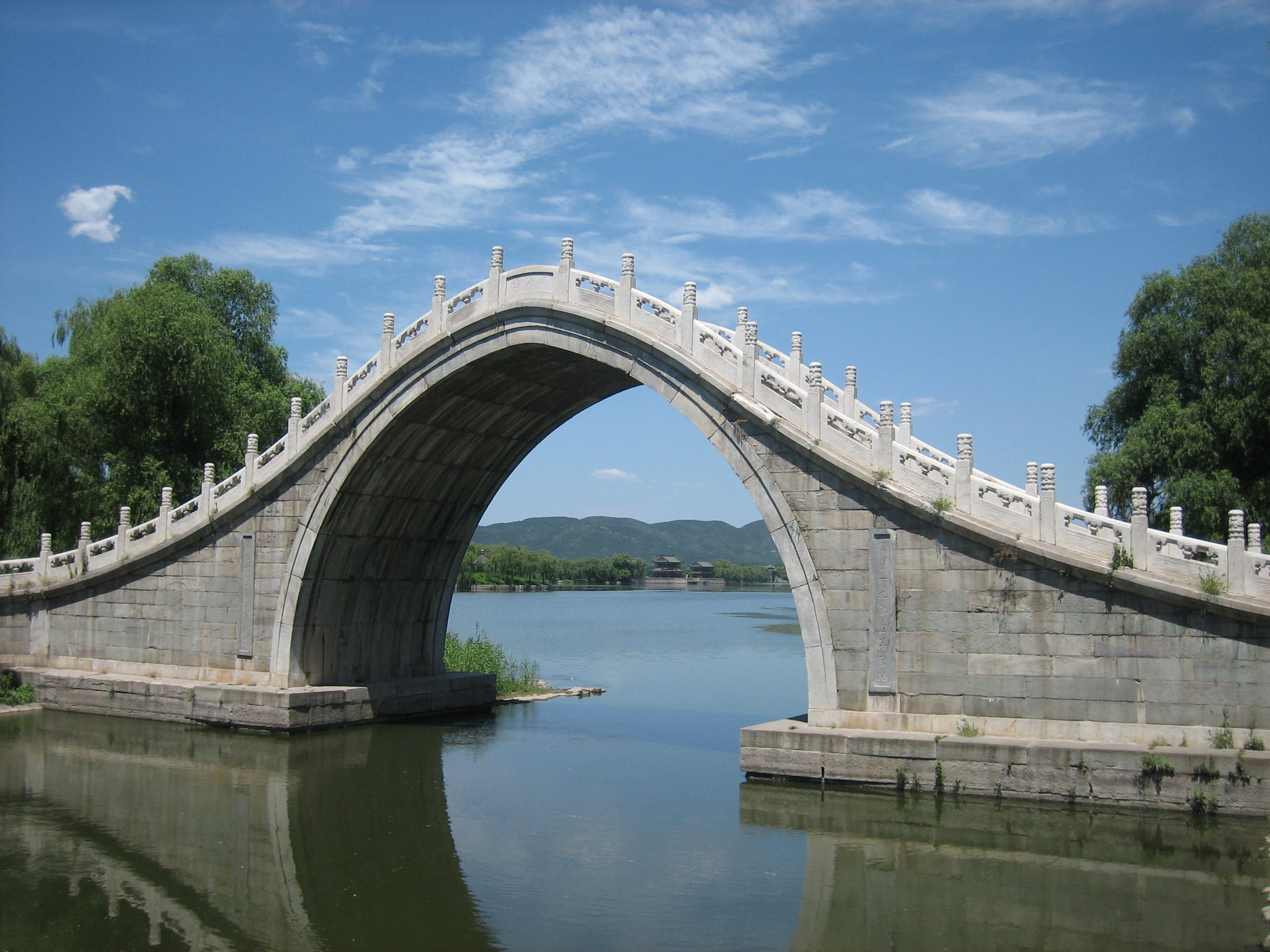
Jade Belt Bridge, a moon bridge at the Summer Palace, Beijing

Chinese garden's structure is based upon the culture's creation myth, rooted in rocks and water. To have longevity is to live among mountains and water; it is to live with nature, to live like an immortal being (Xian). The garden evokes a healthy lifestyle that makes one immortal, free from the problems of civilization. Thus, Chinese landscape is known as Shan (mountain) and Shui (water).

Symbolism is a key element of Chinese garden design. To the earthy tones of the Chinese garden, a touch of red or gold is often added to bring forth the Yin/Yang contrast. The colors red and gold also represent luck and wealth. Bats, dragons, and other mystic creatures carved on wooden doors are also commonly found in Chinese gardens; these are seen as signs of luck and protection.

Circles portray togetherness, especially for family members, and are depicted in moon gates, moon bridges, and round tables placed within square backgrounds. The moon gate and other whimsical doorways also act to frame views and to force the viewer to pause for a transition into a new space.

Paths in Chinese gardens are often uneven and sometimes consciously zigzag. These paths are like the passages of a human life. There is always something new or different when seen from a different angle, while the future is unknown and unpredictable.

=== European gardens ===
==== Gardens of Byzantium ====
The Byzantine empire spanned a period of more than 1000 years (330–1453 AD), and a geographic area from modern day Spain and Britain to the Middle East and northern Africa. Probably due to this temporal and geographic spread and its turbulent history, there is no single dominant garden style that can be labeled "Byzantine style". Archaeological evidence of public, imperial, and private gardens is scant at best, and researchers over the years have relied on literary sources to derive clues about the main features of Byzantine gardens. Romance novels such as Hysmine and Hysminias (12th century) included detailed descriptions of gardens and their popularity attests to the Byzantines’ enthusiasm for pleasure gardens (locus amoenus). More formal gardening texts, such as the Geoponika (10th century), were in fact encyclopaedias of accumulated agricultural practices (grafting, watering) and pagan lore (astrology, plant sympathy/antipathy relationships), going back to Hesiod's time. Their repeated publications and translations to other languages well into the 16th century is evidence to the value attributed to the horticultural knowledge of antiquity. These literary sources worked as handbooks, promoting the concepts of walled gardens with plants arranged by type. Such ideals found expression in the suburban parks (Philopation, Aretai) and palatial gardens (Mesokepion, Mangana) of Constantinople.

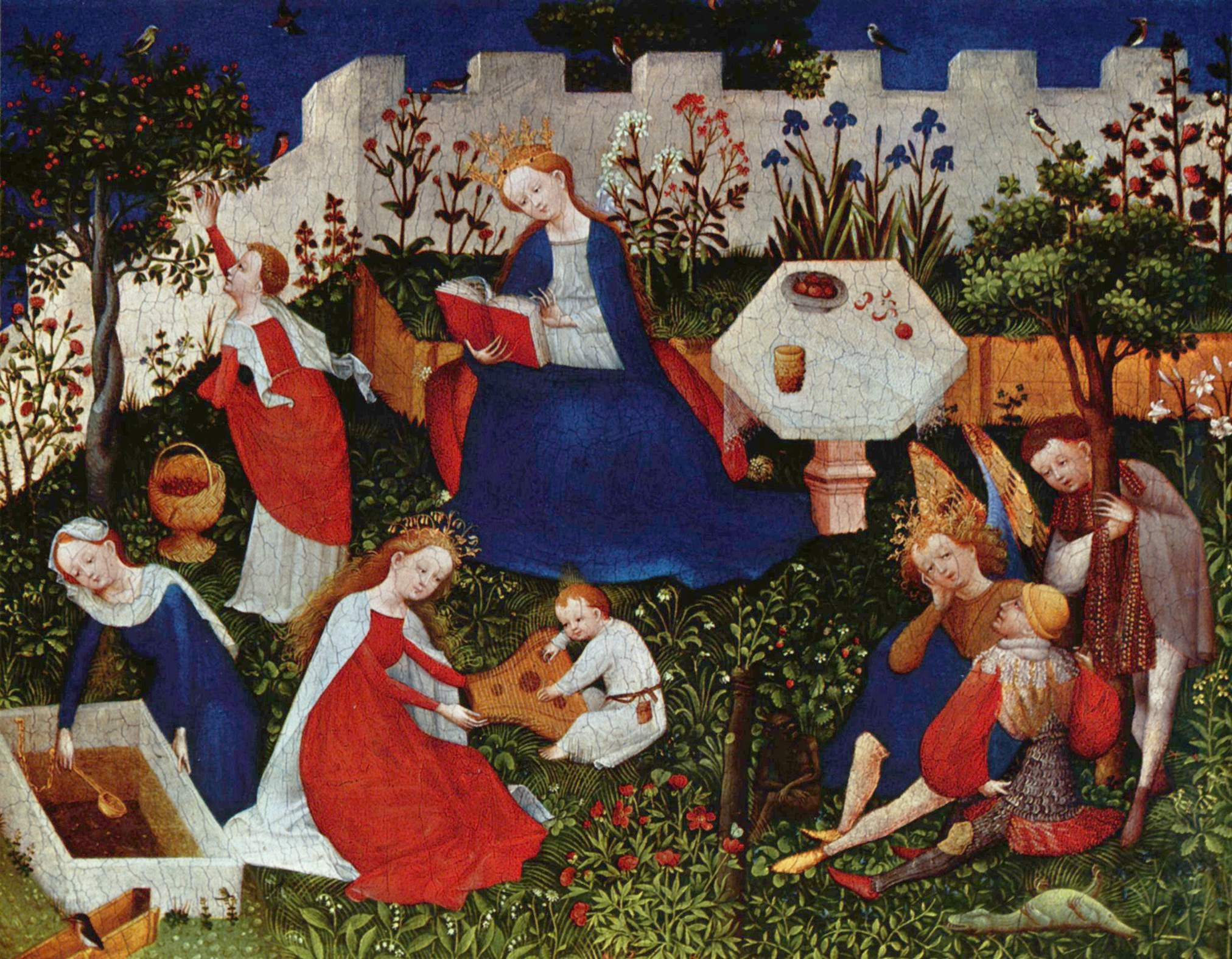
Hortus conclusus depicted by the Upper Rhenish Master

The Byzantine garden tradition was influenced by the strong undercurrents of history that the empire itself was exposed to. The first and foremost influence was the adoption of Christianity as the empire's official religion by its founder Constantine the Great. The new religion signalled a departure from the ornamental pagan sculptures of the Greco-Roman garden style. The second influence was the increasing contact with the Islamic nations of the Middle East, especially after the 9th century. Lavish furnishings in the emperor's palace and the adoption of automata in the palatial gardens are evidence of this influence. The third factor was a fundamental shift in the design of the Byzantine cities after the 7th century when they became smaller in size and population as well as more ruralised. The class of wealthy aristocrats who could finance and maintain elaborate gardens probably shrank as well. The final factor was a shifting view toward a more "enclosed" garden space (hortus conclusus), a dominant trend in Europe at that time. The open views and vistas so much favored by the garden builders of the Roman villas were replaced by garden walls and scenic views painted on the inside of these walls. The concept of the heavenly paradise was an enclosed garden style that gained popularity during that time and especially after the iconoclastic period (7th century) with the emphasis it placed on divine punishment and repentance.

An area of horticulture that flourished throughout the long history of Byzantium was that practiced by monasteries. Although archaeological evidence has provided limited evidence of monastic horticulture, a great deal can be learned by studying the foundation documents (τυπικόν, typikon) of numerous Christian monasteries, as well as the biographies of saints describing their gardening activities. From these sources, we learn that monasteries maintained monastic gardens outside their walls and watered them with complex irrigation systems fed by springs or rainwater. These gardens contained vineyards, broadleaf vegetables, and fruit trees for the sustenance of monks and pilgrims alike. The role of the gardener was frequently assumed by monks as an act of humility. Monastic horticultural practices established at that time are still in use in Christian monasteries throughout Greece and the Middle East.

==== Medieval ====
Monasteries carried on a tradition of garden design and intense horticultural techniques during the medieval period in Europe. Rather than any one particular horticultural technique employed, it is the variety of different purposes the monasteries had for their gardens that serves as testament to their sophistication. As for gardening practices, records are limited, and there are no extant monastic gardens that are entirely true to original form. There are, however, records and plans that indicate the types of garden a monastery might have had, such as those for St. Gall in Switzerland.

Generally, monastic garden types consisted of kitchen gardens, infirmary gardens, cemetery orchards, cloister garths and vineyards. Individual monasteries might also have had a "green court", a plot of grass and trees where horses could graze, as well as a cellarer's garden or private gardens for obedientiaries, monks who held specific posts within the monastery.

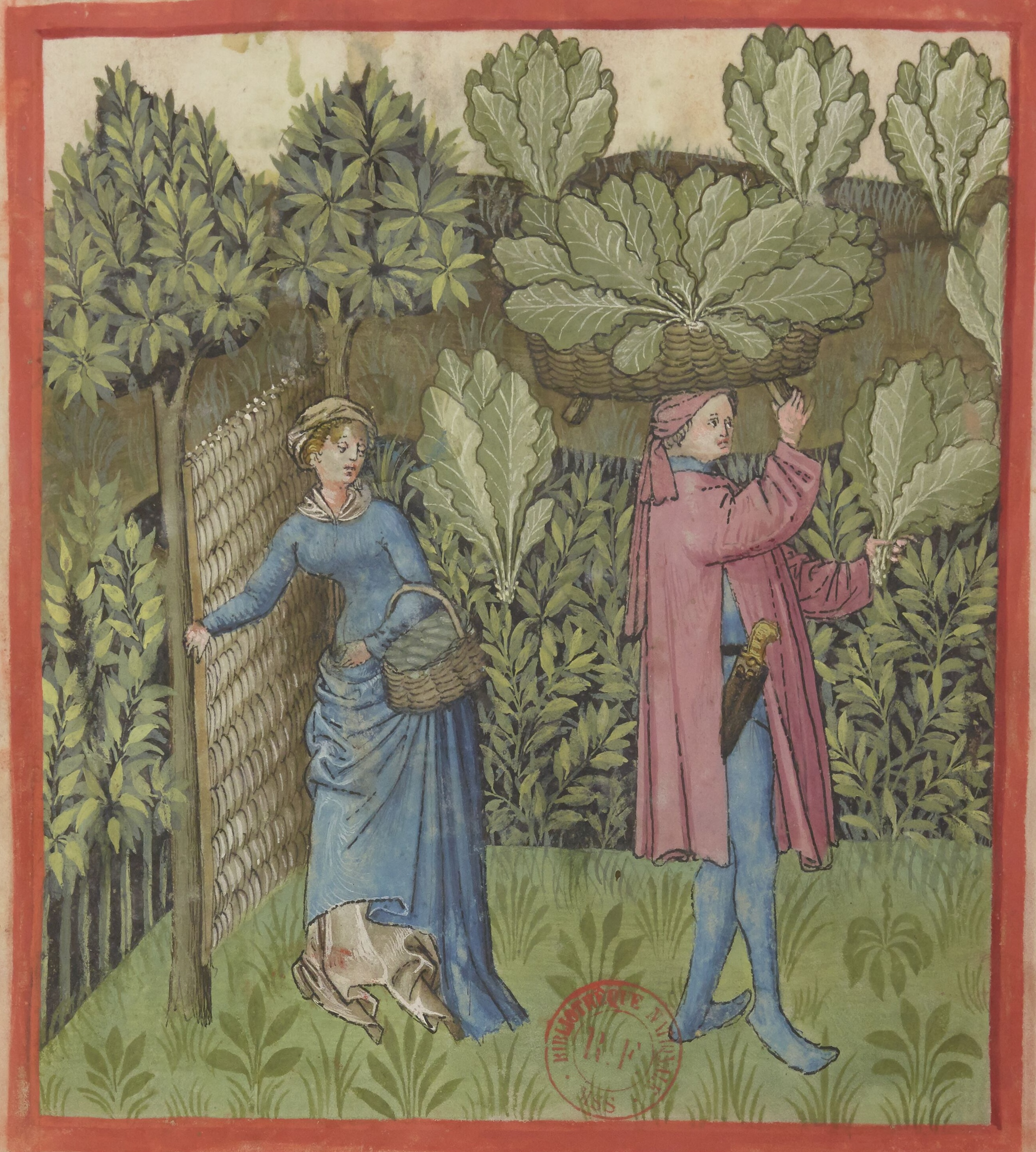
A woven wattle gate keeps animals out of the fifteenth-century cabbage patch (Tacuinum Sanitatis, Rouen).

From a utilitarian standpoint, vegetable and herb gardens helped provide both alimentary and medicinal crops, which could be used to feed or treat the monks and, in some cases, the outside community. As detailed in the plans for St. Gall, these gardens were laid out in rectangular plots, with narrow paths between them to facilitate collection of yields. These beds were often surrounded with wattle fencing to prevent animals from entry. In the kitchen gardens, fennel, cabbage, onion, garlic, leeks, radishes, and parsnips might be grown, as well as peas, lentils, and beans, if space allowed for them. The infirmary gardens could contain Rosa gallica ("The Apothecary Rose"), savory, costmary, fenugreek, rosemary, peppermint, rue, iris, sage, bergamot, mint, lovage, fennel, and cumin, amongst other herbs.

The herb and vegetable gardens served a purpose beyond that of production, and that was that their installation and maintenance allowed the monks to fulfil the manual labour component of the religious way of life prescribed by the Rule of St. Benedict.

Orchards also served as sites for food production and as arenas for manual labour, and cemetery orchards, such as that detailed in the plan for St. Gall, showed yet more versatility. The cemetery orchard not only produced fruit, but manifested as a natural symbol of the garden of Paradise. This bi-fold concept of the garden as a space that met both physical and spiritual needs was carried over to the cloister garth.

The cloister garth, a claustrum consisting of the viridarium, a rectangular plot of grass surrounded by peristyle arcades, was barred to the laity, and served primarily as a place of retreat, a locus of the vita contemplativa. The viridarium was often bisected or quartered by paths, and often featured a roofed fountain at the centre or side of the garth that served as a primary source for wash water and for irrigation, meeting yet more physical needs. Some cloister gardens contained small fish ponds as well, another source of food for the community. The arcades were used for teaching, sitting and meditating, or for exercise in inclement weather.

There is much conjecture as to ways in which the garth served as a spiritual aid. Umberto Eco describes the green swath as a sort of balm on which a monk might rest weary eyes, so as to return to reading with renewed vigor. Some scholars suggest that, though sparsely planted, plant materials found in the cloister garth might have inspired various religious visions. This tendency to imbue the garden with symbolic values was not inherent to the religious orders alone, but was a feature of medieval culture in general. The square cloister garth was meant to represent the four points of the compass, and so the universe as a whole. As Turner puts it,

Augustine inspired medieval garden makers to abjure earthliness and look upward for divine inspiration. A perfect square with a round pool and a pentagonal fountain became a microcosm, illuminating the mathematical order and divine grace of the macrocosm (the universe).

Walking around the cloister while meditating was a way of devoting oneself to the "path of life"; indeed, each of the monastic gardens was imbued with symbolic as well as palpable value, testifying to the ingenuity of its creators.

In the later Middle Ages, texts, art, and literary works provide a picture of developments in garden design. During the late 12th to 15th centuries, European cities were walled for internal defense and to control trade. Though space within these walls was limited, surviving documents show that there were animals, fruit trees and kitchen gardens inside the city limits.

Pietro Crescenzi, a Bolognese lawyer, wrote twelve volumes on the practical aspects of farming in the 13th century which offers a description of medieval gardening practices. From his text, we know that gardens were surrounded with stonewalls, thick hedging, or fencing, and incorporated trellises and arbors. They borrowed their form from the square or rectangular shape of the cloister and included square planting beds.

Grass was also first noted in the medieval garden. In the De Vegetabilibus of Albertus Magnus, written around 1260, instructions are given for planting grass plots. Raised banks covered in turf called "turf seats" were constructed to provide seating in the garden. Fruit trees were prevalent and often grafted to produce new varieties of fruit. Gardens included a raised mound or mount to serve as a stage for viewing, and planting beds were customarily elevated on raised platforms.

Two works from the late Middle Ages discuss plant cultivation. In the English poem "The Feate of Gardinage" by Jon Gardener and the general household advice given in Le Ménagier de Paris of 1393, a variety of herbs, flowers, fruit trees, and bushes were listed with instructions on their cultivation. The Ménagier provides advice by season on sowing, planting, and grafting. The most sophisticated gardening during the Middle Ages was done at the monasteries. Monks developed horticultural techniques and cultivated herbs, fruits, and vegetables. Using the medicinal herbs they grew, monks treated those suffering inside the monastery and in surrounding communities.

During the Middle Ages, gardens were thought to unite the earthly with the divine. The enclosed garden as an allegory for paradise or a "lost Eden" was termed the hortus conclusus. Freighted with religious and spiritual significance, enclosed gardens were often depicted in the visual arts, picturing the Virgin Mary, a fountain, a unicorn, and roses inside an enclosed area.

Though Medieval gardens lacked many of the features of the Renaissance gardens that followed them, some of the characteristics of these gardens continue to be incorporated today.

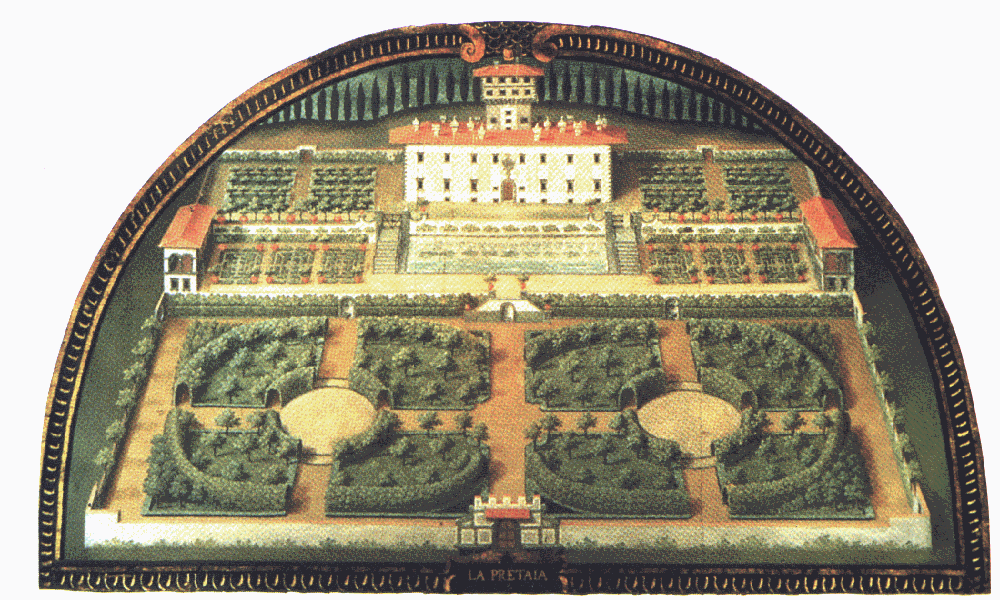
The Medici Villa Petraia, near Florence, laid out by Niccolò Tribolo, epitomizes the Italian garden of the early Renaissance, before the grander architectural schemes of the 16th century.

==== The Renaissance ====
The Italian Renaissance inspired a revolution in private gardening. Renaissance private gardens were full of scenes from ancient mythology and other learned allusions. Water during this time was especially symbolic: it was associated with fertility and the abundance of nature.

The first public gardens were built by the Spanish Crown in the 16th century, in Europe and the Americas.

==== French Baroque ====
The Garden à la française, or Baroque French gardens, was in the tradition of André Le Nôtre.

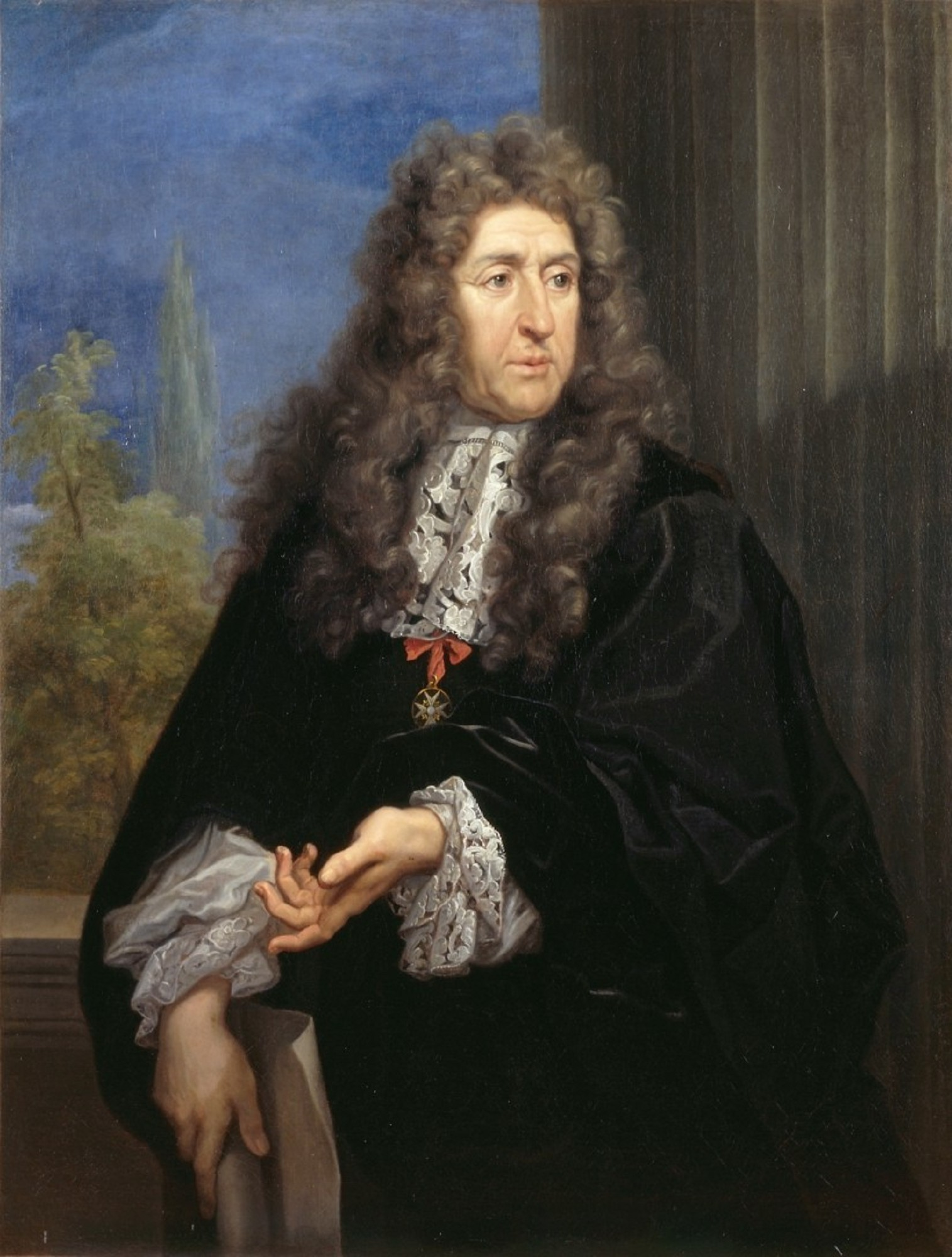
Portrait of André Le Nôtre (12 March 1613-15 September 1700) by Carlo Maratta

The French Classical garden style, or garden à la française, climaxed during the reign of Louis XIV of France (1638–1715) and his head gardener of Gardens of Versailles, André Le Nôtre (1613–1700). The inspiration for these gardens initially came from the Italian Renaissance garden of the 14th and 15th centuries and ideas of French philosopher René Descartes (1596–1650). At this time the French opened the garden up to enormous proportions compared to their Italian predecessor. Their gardens epitomize monarch and 'man' dominating and manipulating nature to show his authority, wealth, and power.

Renée Descartes, the founder of analytical geometry, believed that the natural world was objectively measurable and that space is infinitely divisible. His belief that "all movement is a straight line therefore space is a universal grid of mathematical coordinates and everything can be located on its infinitely extendable planes" gave us Cartesian mathematics. Through the classical French gardens this coordinate system and philosophy is now given a physical and visual representation.

This French formal and axial garden style placed the house centrally on an enormous and mainly flat property of land. A large central axis that gets narrower further from the main house, forces the viewer's perspective to the horizon line, making the property look even larger. The viewer is to see the property as a cohesive whole but at the same time is unable to see all the components of the garden. One is to be led through a logical progression or story and be surprised by elements that aren't visible until approached. There is an allegorical story referring to the owner through statues and water features which have mythological references. There are small, almost imperceptible grade changes that help conceal the gardens surprises as well as elongate the gardens views.

These grand gardens have organized spaces meant to be elaborate stages for entertaining the court and guests with plays, concerts and fireworks displays. The following list of garden features were used:

- allée
- axis of symmetry
- bosquet
- broderie
- canal
- cul de sac
- fountains
- gloriette
- grottos with rocaille
- jeux d'eau
- orangerie
- parterre
- patte d'oie
- sylvan theater
- tapis vert
- topiary

==== Mediterranean gardens ====
Due to being an early hub for Western society and being used for centuries, Mediterranean soil was fragile, and one could think of the region's landscape culture to be a conflict between fruitfulness and frugality. The area consisted largely of small-scale agricultural plots. Later, following World War II, Mediterranean immigrants brought this agricultural style to Canada, where fruit trees and vegetables in the backyard became common.

==== Anglo-Dutch gardens ====
- Anglo-Dutch formal gardens

==== Picturesque and English Landscape gardens ====
Forested areas played a number of roles for the British in the Middle Ages, and one of those roles was to produce game for the gentry. Lords of valuable land were expected to provide a bounty of animals for hunting during royal visits. Despite being in natural locations, forested manor homes could symbolize status, wealth and power if they appeared to have all amenities. After the Industrial Revolution, Britain's forest industry shrank until it no longer existed. In response, the Garden City Movement brought urban planning into industrialized areas in the early 20th century to offset negative industrial effects such as pollution.

There were several traditions that influenced English gardening in the 18th century, the first of which was to plant woods around homes. By the mid-17th century, coppice planting became consistent and was considered visually and aesthetically pleasing. Whereas forested areas were more useful for hunting purposes in Britain during the Middle Ages, 18th-century patterns demonstrate a further deviation in gardening approach from practicality toward design meant to please the senses.

Likewise, English pleasure grounds were influenced by medieval groves, some of which were still in existence in 18th-century Britain. This influence manifested in the form of shrubbery, sometimes organized in mazes or maze-like formations. And though also ancient, shredding became a common characteristic of these early gardens, as the method enabled light to enter the understory. Shredding was used to make garden groves, which ideally included an orchard with fruit trees, fragrant herbs and flowers, and moss-covered pathways.

While the earliest account of a botanical garden was in Pisa in 1543, the first discovered English botanical garden was in Oxford in 1621. Near London, the gardens at Kew was established in 1759. August, dowager princess of Wales worked with well-known botanists of the time, Lord Bute and Stephen Hales, to greatly expand the garden with exotic plants. By 1769, Kew Gardens contained over 3,400 variations of plants.

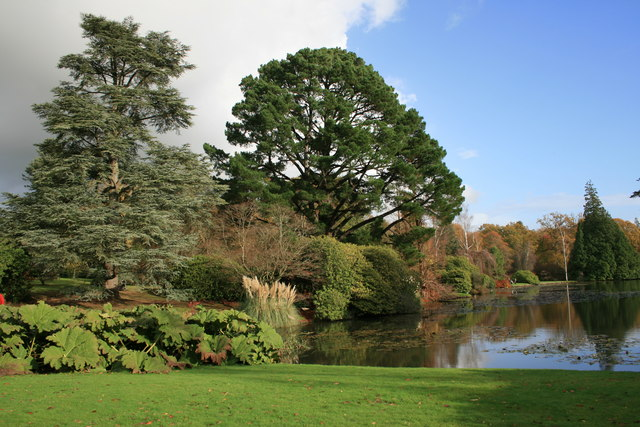
Sheffield Park Garden, a landscape garden originally laid out in the 18th century by Capability Brown

The picturesque garden style emerged in England in the 18th century, one of the growing currents of the larger Romantic movement. Garden designers like William Kent and Capability Brown emulated the allegorical landscape paintings of European artists, especially Claude Lorrain, Poussin and Salvator Rosa. The manicured hills, lakes and trees dotted with allegorical temples were sculpted into the land.

By the 1790s there was a reaction against these stereotypical compositions; a number of thinkers began to promote the idea of picturesque gardens. The leader of the movement was landscape theorist William Gilpin, an accomplished artist known for his realistic depictions of Nature. He preferred the natural landscape over the manicured and urged designers to respond to the topography of a given site. He also noted that while classical beauty was associated with the smooth and neat, picturesque beauty had a wilder, untamed quality. The picturesque style also incorporated architectural follies—castles, Gothic ruins, rustic cottages—built to add interest and depth to the landscape

Controversy between the picturesque school and proponents of the more manicured garden raged well into the 19th century. Landscape designer Humphry Repton supported Gilpin's ideas, particularly that of the garden harmonizing with surrounding landforms. He was attacked in the press by two rival theorists, Richard Payne Knight and Uvedale Price. Repton countered by highlighting the differences between painting and landscape gardening, William Shenstone has been credited with coining the term ‘landscape gardening’. Unlike a painting, the viewer moves through a garden, constantly shifting viewpoints.

The French landscape garden, also called the jardin anglais or jardin pittoresque, was influenced by contemporary English gardens. Rococo features like Turkish tents and Chinese bridges are prevalent in French gardens in the 18th century. The French Picturesque garden style falls into two categories: those that were staged, almost like theatrical scenery, usually rustic and exotic, called jardin anglo-chinois, and those filled with pastoral romance and bucolic sentiment, influenced by Jean-Jacques Rousseau. The former style is represented by the Désert de Retz and Parc Monceau, the latter by the Moulin Jolie.

The rusticity found in French picturesque gardens is also derived from admiration of Dutch 17th-century landscape painting and works of the French 18th-century artists Claude-Henri Watelet, François Boucher and Hubert Robert.

English garden is the common term in the English-speaking world for interpretations, derivations, and revivals in the style of the original Landscape Garden examples.

==== Gardenesque gardens ====
The gardenesque style of English garden design evolved during the 1820s from Humphry Repton's Picturesque or "Mixed" style, largely through the efforts of J. C. Loudon, who invented the term.

In a gardenesque plan, all trees, shrubs, and other plants are positioned and managed in such a way that the character of each plant can be displayed to its full potential. With the spread of botany as a suitable subject of study for the enlightened, the gardenesque tended to emphasize botanical curiosities and a collector's approach. New plant material that would have seemed bizarre and alien in earlier gardening found settings: pampas grass from Argentina and monkey-puzzle trees from Chile, for example. Winding paths linked scattered plantings. The gardenesque approach involved the creation of small-scale landscapes, dotted with features and vignettes, to promote beauty of detail, variety and mystery, sometimes to the detriment of coherence. Artificial mounds helped to stage groupings of shrubs, and island beds became prominent features.

==== Wild gardens and herbaceous borders ====
The books of William Robinson describing his own "wild" gardening at Gravetye Manor in Sussex, and the sentimental picture of a rosy, idealized "cottage garden" of the kind pictured by Kate Greenaway, which had scarcely existed historically, both influenced the development of the mixed herbaceous borders that were advocated by Gertrude Jekyll at Munstead Wood in Surrey from the 1890s. Her plantings, which mixed shrubs with perennial and annual plants and bulbs in deep beds within more formal structures of terraces and stairs designed by Edwin Lutyens, set the model for high-style, high-maintenance gardening until the Second World War. Vita Sackville-West's garden at Sissinghurst Castle, Kent is the most famous and influential garden of this last blossoming of romantic style, publicized by the gardener's own gardening column in The Observer. The trend continued in the gardening of Margery Fish at East Lambrook Manor. In the last quarter of the 20th century, less structured wildlife gardening emphasized the ecological framework of similar gardens using native plants. A leading proponent in the United States was the landscape architect Jens Jensen. He designed city and regional parks, and private estates, with a honed aesthetic of art and nature.

=== Mesoamerican gardens ===
In the Western Hemisphere, various Mesoamerican cultures, such as the Maya, Mixtecs, and Nahua peoples (including the Aztec Empire) had both practical and aesthetic gardening traditions. The Maya made extensive usage of forest gardens for food and medicinal plant production, including with their cities. The Aztec elite built elaborate pleasure gardens in the Valley of Mexico consisting of various types of plants as well as water features such as aqueduct-fed fountains. Aztec and Maya gardens had a strong focus on fertility, due to their primarily agricultural nature. The Aztecs also had a strong love of flowers, placing great religious, metaphorical, and philosophical significance on them.

=== Contemporary gardens ===
- Romantic English cottage garden revival
- Modernist gardens
- Naturalistic habitat gardens

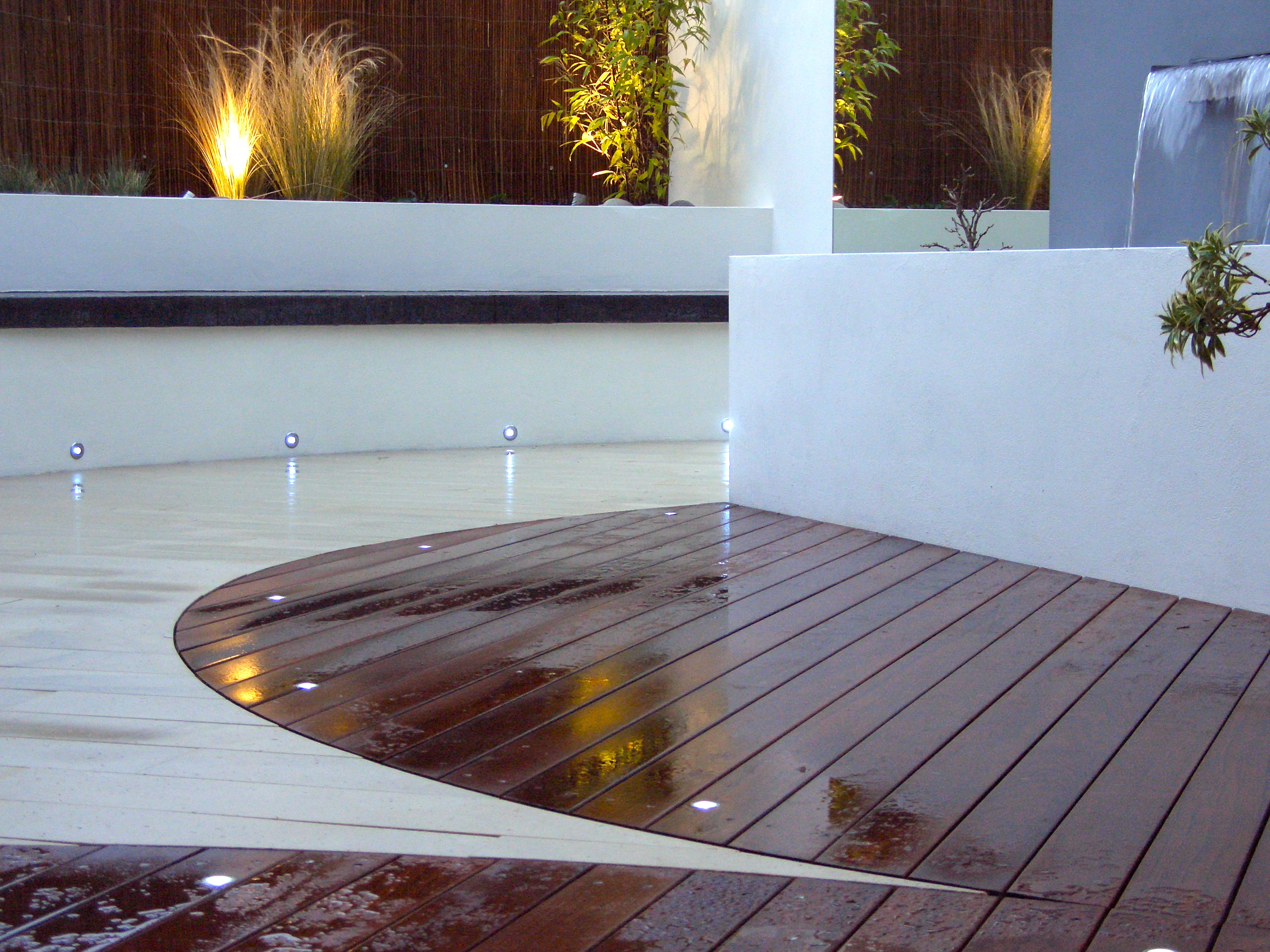
Contemporary garden in Colchester, United Kingdom

In the 20th century, modern design for gardens became important as architects began to design buildings and residences with an eye toward innovation and streamlining the formal Beaux-Arts and derivative early revival styles, removing unnecessary references and embellishment. Garden design, inspired by modern architecture, naturally followed in the same philosophy of "form following function", thus concerning the many philosophies of plant maturity. In post-war United States people's residences and domestic lives became more outdoor oriented, especially in the western states as promoted by Sunset, with the backyard often becoming an outdoor room.

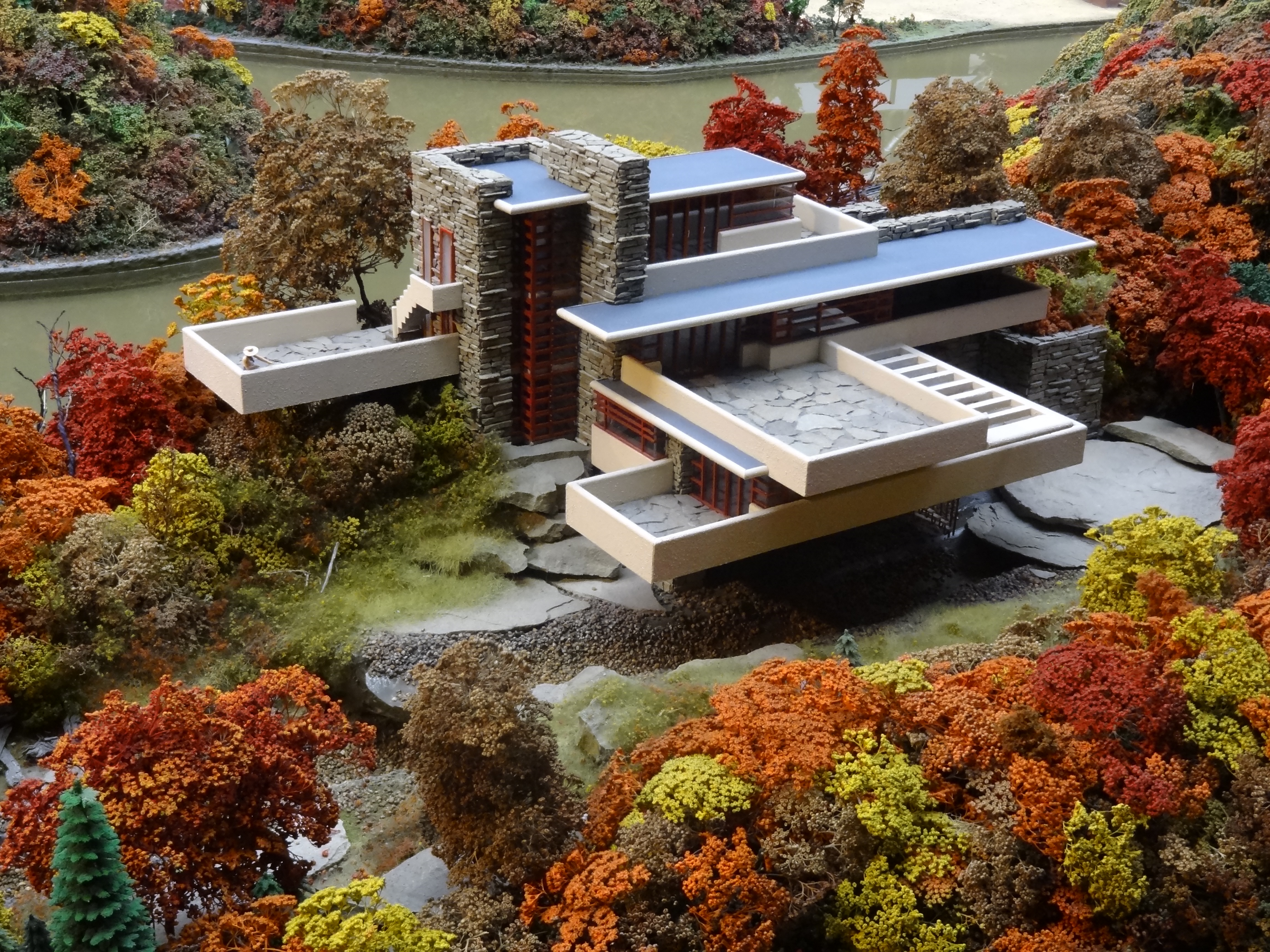
Scale model of the Fallingwater building, Carnegie Science Center in Pittsburgh

Frank Lloyd Wright demonstrated his interpretation for the modern garden by designing homes in complete harmony with natural surroundings. Taliesin and Fallingwater are both examples of careful placement of architecture in nature so the relationship between the residence and surroundings become seamless. His son, Lloyd Wright, trained in architecture and landscape architecture in the Olmsted Brothers office, with his father and with architect Irving Gill. He practiced an innovative organic integration of structure and landscape in his works.

Subsequently, Garrett Eckbo, James Rose, and Dan Kiley – known as the "bad boys of Harvard" – met while studying traditional landscape architecture became notable pioneers in the design of modern gardens. As Harvard embraced modern design in their school of architecture, these designers wanted to interpret and incorporate those new ideas in landscape design. They became interested in developing functional space for outdoor living with designs echoing natural surroundings. Modern gardens feature a fresh mix of curved and architectonic designs and many include abstract art in geometrics and sculpture. Spaces are defined with the thoughtful placement of trees and plantings. Thomas Church work in California was influential through his books and other publications. In Sonoma County, California his 1948 Donnell garden's swimming pool, kidney-shaped with an abstract sculpture within it, became an icon of modern outdoor living.

In Mexico Luis Barragán explored a synthesis of International style modernism with native Mexican tradition in private estates and residential development projects such as Jardines del Pedregal and the San Cristobal 'Los Clubes' Estates in Mexico City. In civic design the Torres de Satélite are urban sculptures of substantial dimensions in Naucalpan, Mexico. His house, studio, and gardens, built in 1948 in Mexico City, was listed as a UNESCO World Heritage Site in 2004.

Roberto Burle Marx is accredited with having introduced modernist landscape architecture to Brazil. He was known as a modern nature artist and a public urban space designer. He was landscape architect (as well as a botanist, painter, print maker, ecologist, naturalist, artist, and musician) who designed of parks and gardens in Brazil, Argentina, Venezuela, Kuala Lumpur, Malaysia, and in the United States in Florida. He worked with the architects Lúcio Costa and Oscar Niemeyer on the landscape design for some of the prominent modernist government buildings in Brazil's capitol Brasília.

== Historic gardeners ==
The following names, roughly in historical order, made contributions that affected the history of gardens, whether as botanist explorers, designers, garden-makers, or writers. Further information on them will be found under their individual entries.

- Theophrastus
- Lucullus
- Tiberius
- Pliny the Elder
- Pliny the Younger
- Pacello da Mercogliano
- John Tradescant the elder and his son of the same name
- Carolus Clusius
- André le Nôtre
- Thomas Hill
- John Evelyn
- George London
- Henry Wise
- William Kent
- Lancelot "Capability" Brown
- Humphry Repton
- Andrew Jackson Downing
- Frederick Law Olmsted
- George Loddiges
- Giovanni Baptista Ferrari
- John Loudon
- Friedrich Ludwig von Sckell
- Peter Joseph Lenné
- Joseph Paxton
- Thomas Jefferson
- William Robinson (gardener)
- Gertrude Jekyll
- Constance Villiers-Stuart
- Lawrence Johnston
- Edwin Lutyens
- Vita Sackville-West
- Claude Monet
- Jens Jensen
- Theodore Payne
- Beatrix Farrand
- Florence Yoch + Louise Council
- Ganna Walska
- Lockwood DeForest
- A.E. Hanson
- Russell Page
- Luis Barragán
- Gustav Ammann
- Lawrence Halprin
- Roberto Burle Marx
- Xavier de Winthuysen
- Nicolau María Rubió i Tudurí
- Sylvia Crowe
- Pietro Porcinai
- Gerard Ciołek
- Gilles Clément

== Notable historic gardens ==
=== Brazil ===
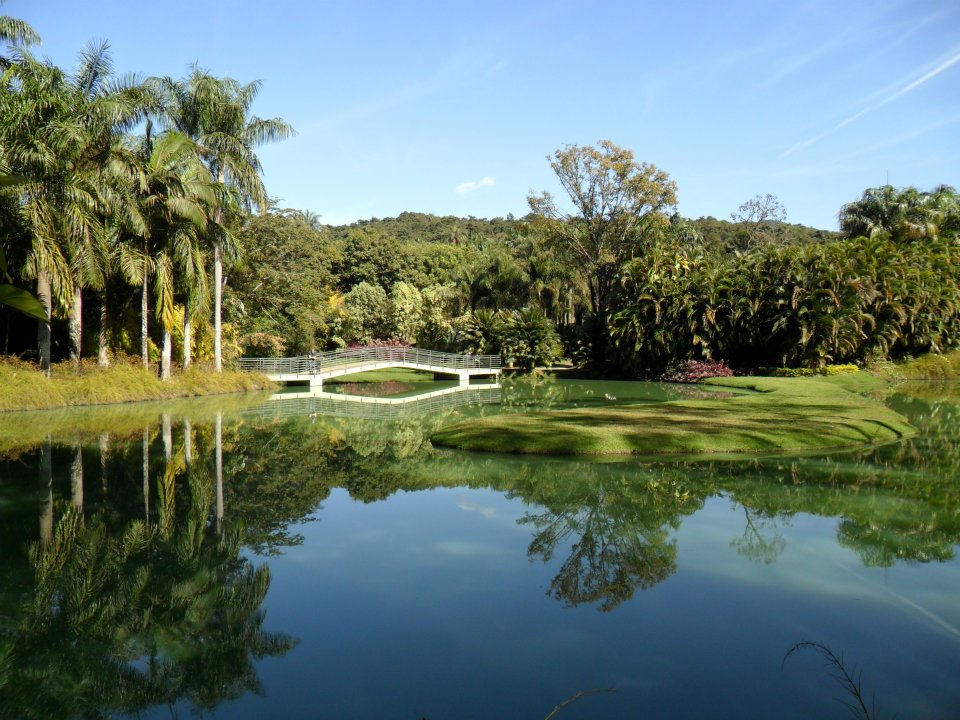
Inhotim, Brumadinho, Brasil

- Brasília- selected locations; (Roberto Burle Marx)
- Ibirapuera Park, São Paulo

=== Canada ===
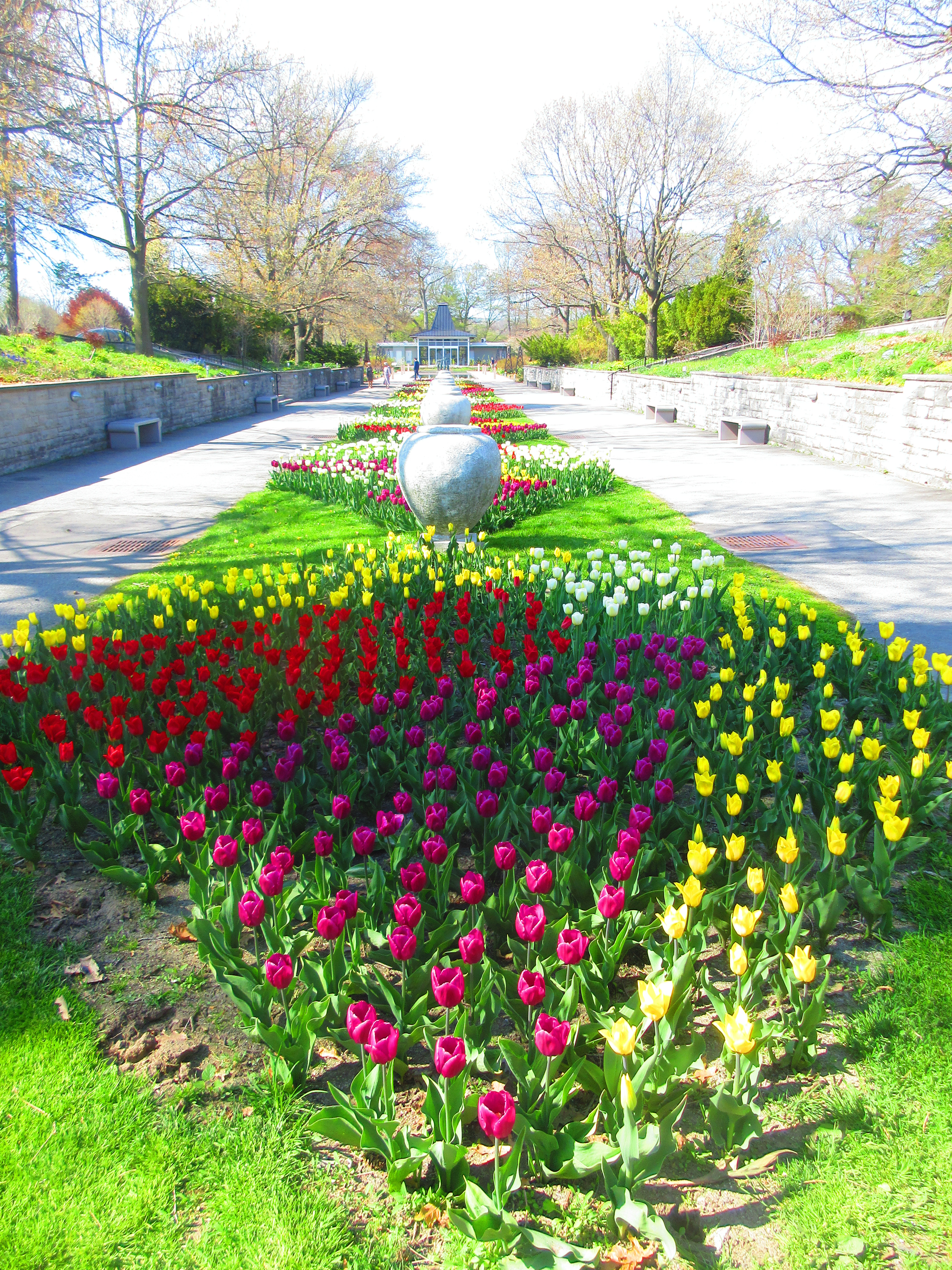
The Oak Allee in the Gardens in Hendrie Park at Royal Botanical Gardens (Ontario), designed by J. Austin Floyd in 1965

- The Butchart Gardens (British Columbia) (1909)
- Halifax Public Gardens (Nova Scotia) (1867)
- Royal Botanical Gardens (Ontario) (1932)
- Montreal Botanical Garden (Quebec) (1931)

=== China ===
- Gardens of Suzhou
- Summer Palace
- Beihai Park
- Yuyuan Garden
- Prince Gong Mansion

=== England ===
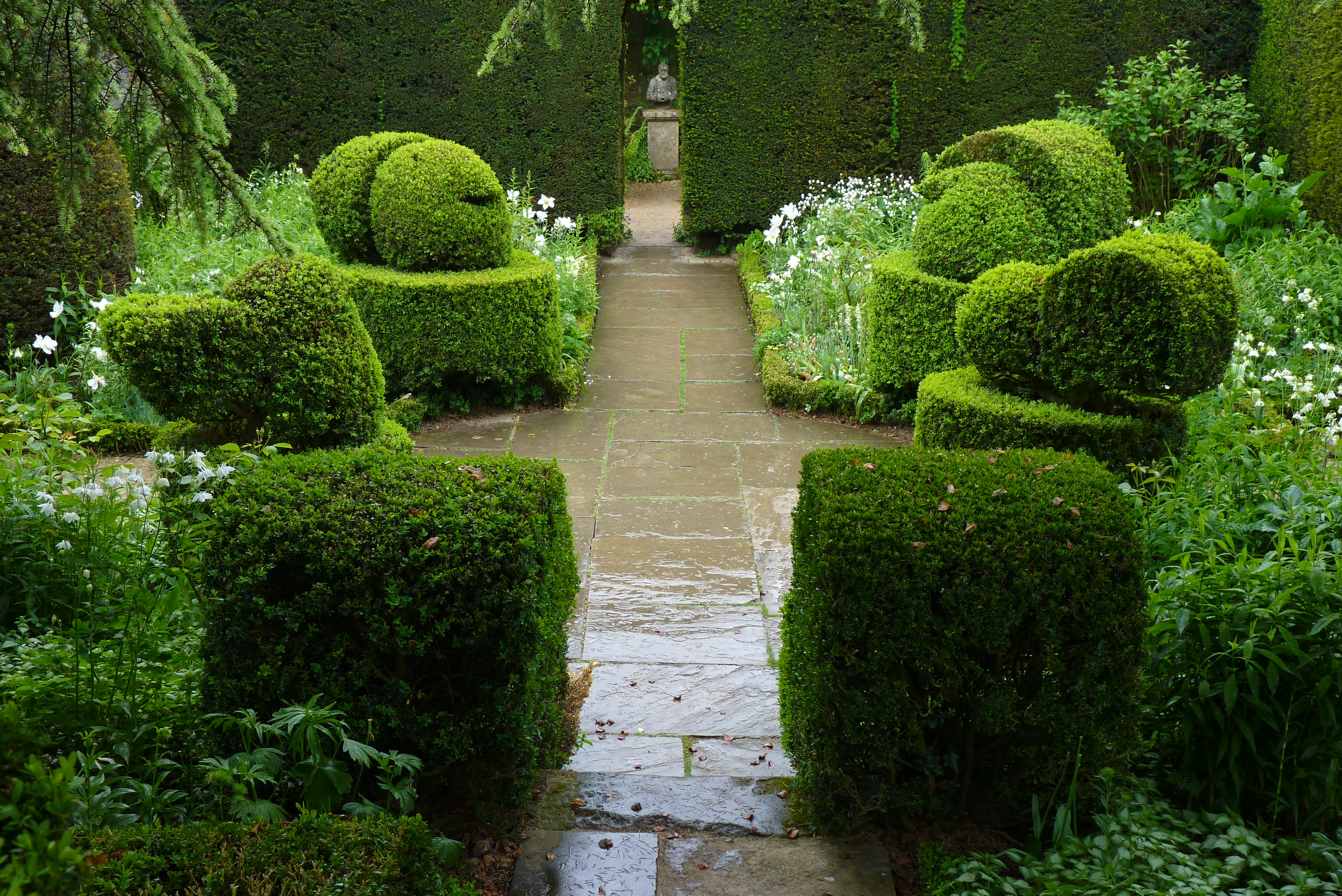
White garden at Hidcote Manor Garden, one of several garden rooms there

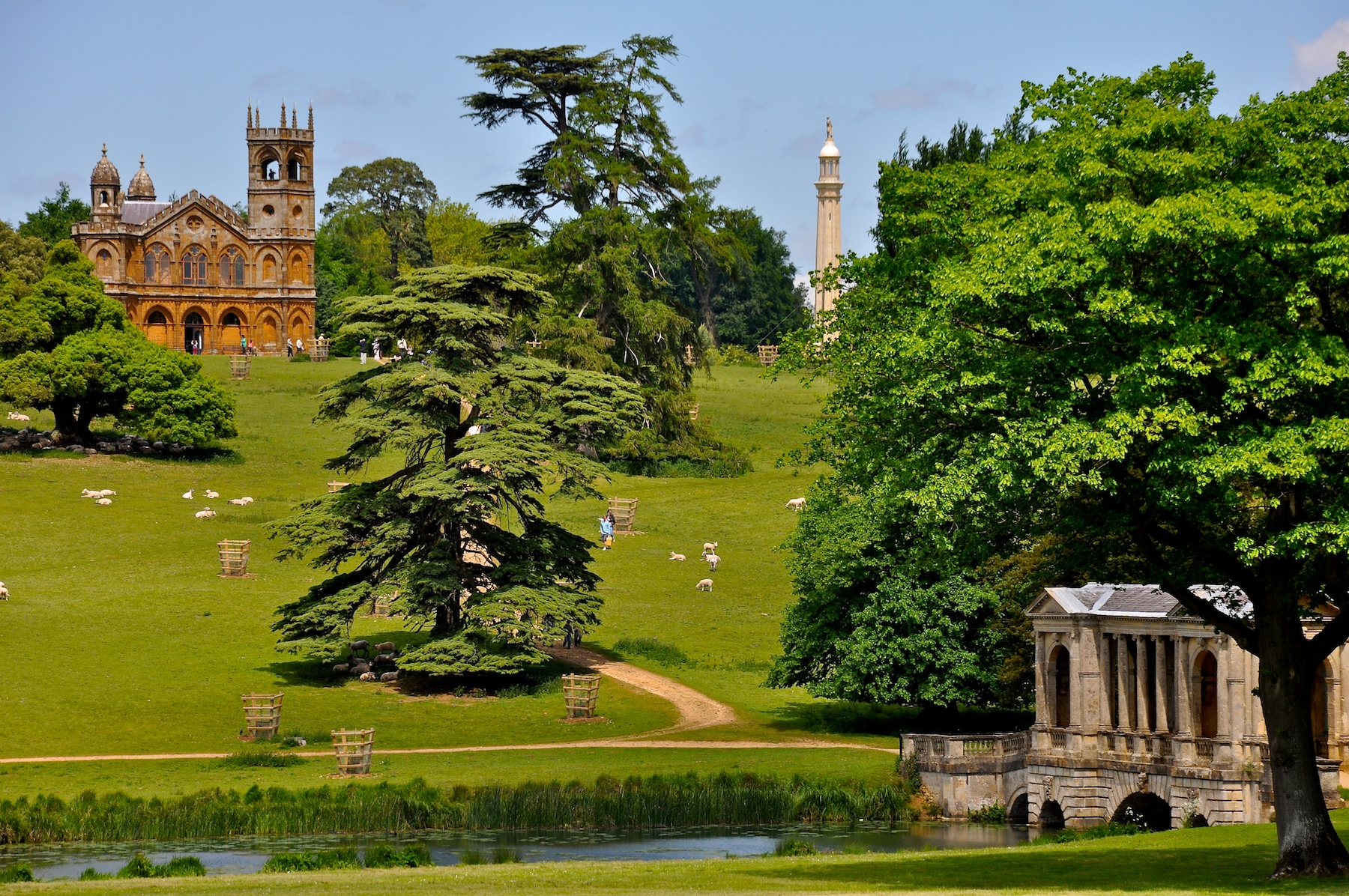
Hawkwell Field with Gothic temple, Cobham monument and Palladian bridge at Stowe House

==== Public gardens ====
- Meadow of Moorfields, London (1605) (destroyed)
- Hyde Park, London (1728)
- Peel Park, Salford (1846)
- Royal Botanic Gardens, Kew, Richmond (1771)

==== Private gardens ====
- Blenheim Palace
- Chatsworth
- Fountains Abbey
- Hidcote Manor Garden
- Lost Gardens of Heligan
- Rousham House
- Sissinghurst Castle
- Stourhead
- Stowe Gardens

=== France ===
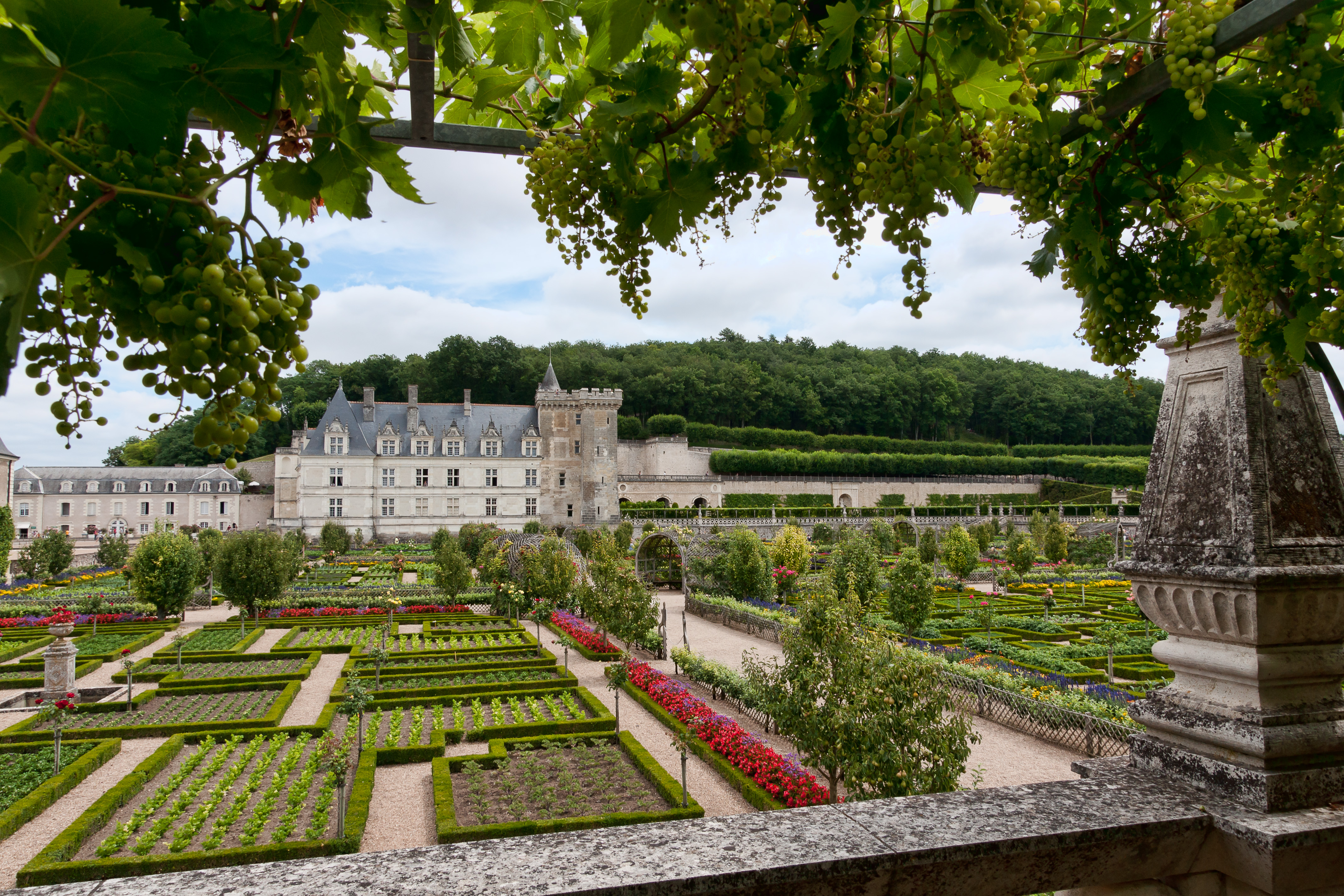
Château de Villandry gardens

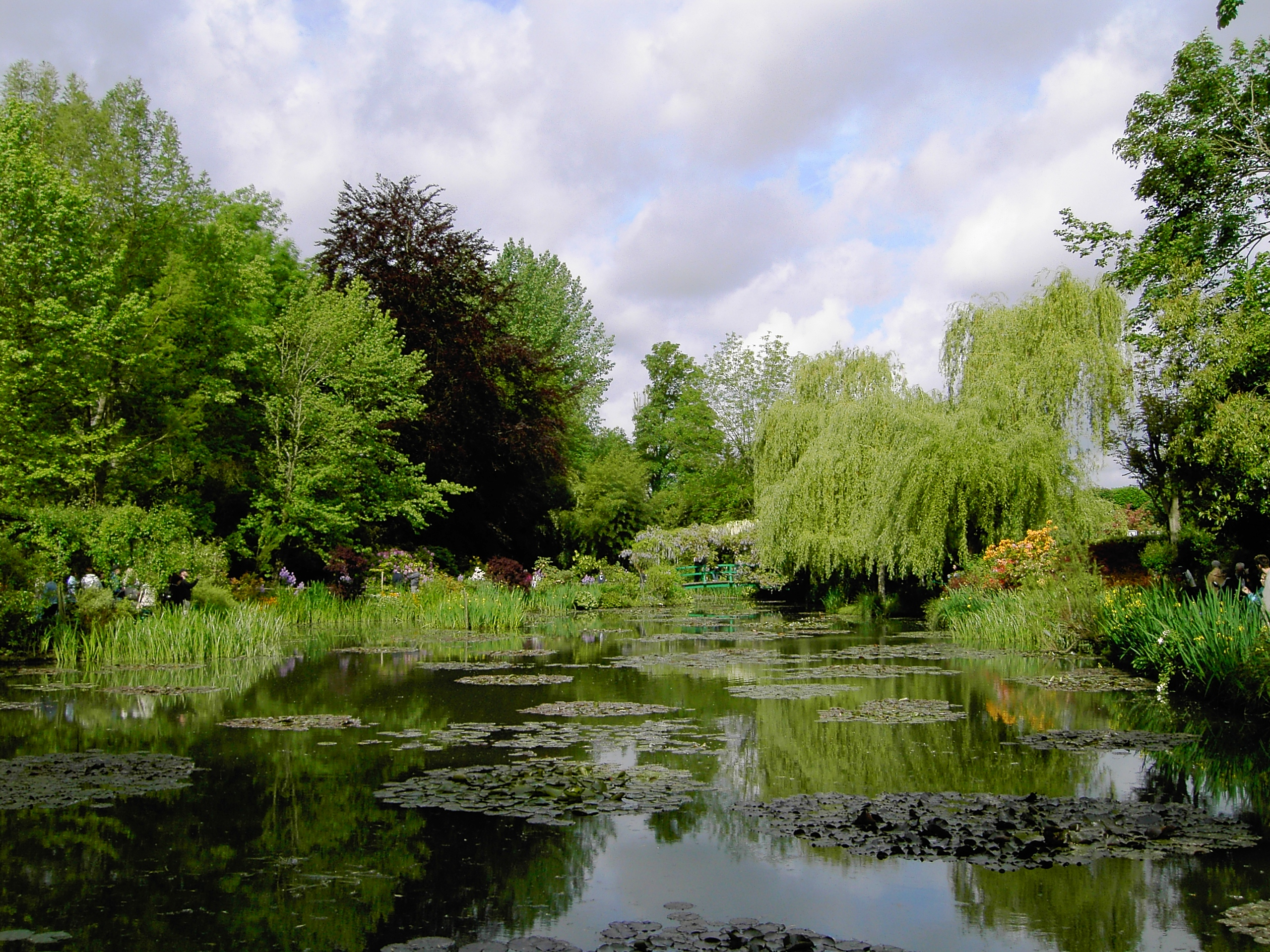
Giverny

==== Public gardens ====
- Champs-Élysées, Paris (1640)
- Jardin des Tuileries, Paris (1664)
- Bois de Boulogne, Paris (1852)
- Place des Vosges, Paris (1682)

==== Private gardens ====
- Chateau Fontainebleau
- Château de Marly
- Château de Villandry
- Parc Jean-Jacques Rousseau
- Fondation Monet in Giverny
- Gardens of Versailles
- Potager du roi, Versailles (King's Kitchen Garden)
- Vaux-le-Vicomte

=== Germany ===
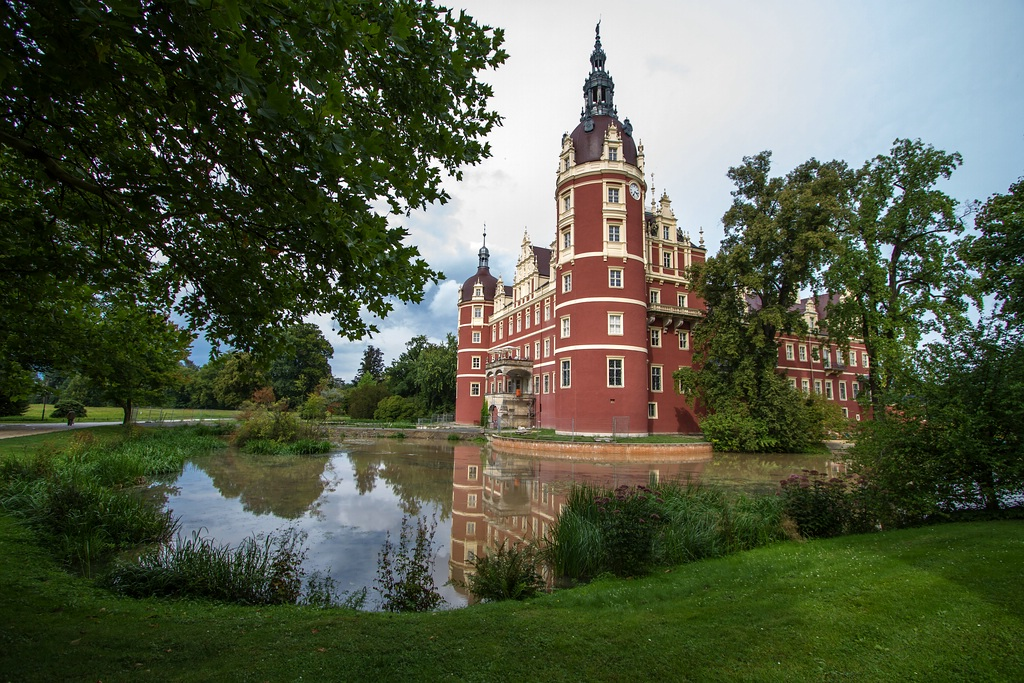
The Muskau Park

- Muskau Park
- Dessau-Wörlitz Garden Realm
- Herrenhausen Gardens

=== Hungary ===
- City Park (Budapest) (1810)

=== India ===
- Shalimar Gardens (Jammu and Kashmir)
- Brindavan Gardens (Mysore)
- Amrit Udyan at Rashtrapati Bhavan (Delhi)

=== Iraq ===
- Hanging Gardens of Babylon

=== Ireland ===
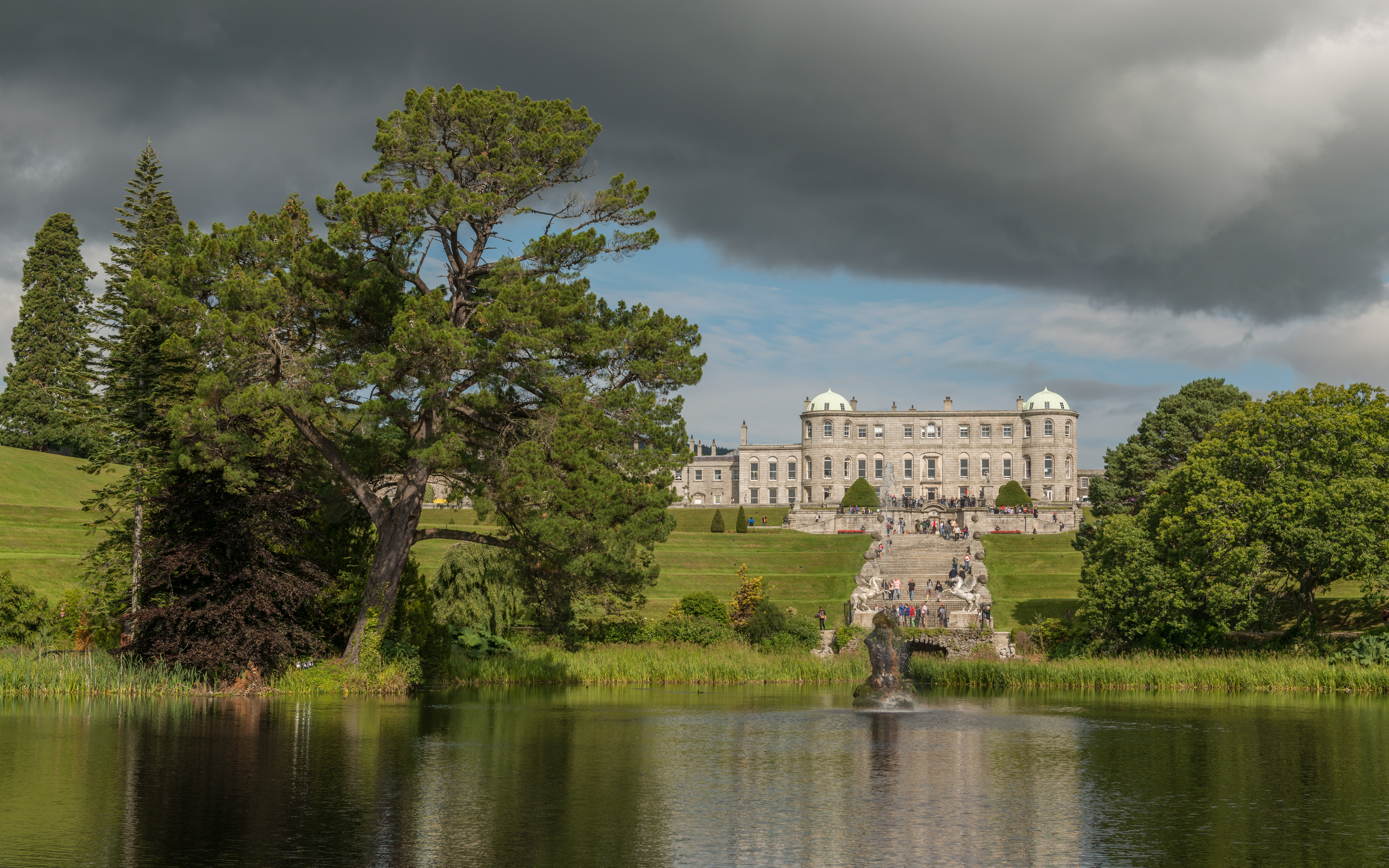
Triton Lake at Powerscourt Gardens

- Historic Cork Gardens
- Powerscourt Gardens
- Mount Usher Gardens

=== Israel ===
- Bahá'í Hanging Gardens of Haifa

=== Italy ===
==== Public gardens ====
- Poplars mall in Campo Vaccino in the area of the ancient Roman Forum, Rome (1656) (destroyed)

==== Private gardens ====
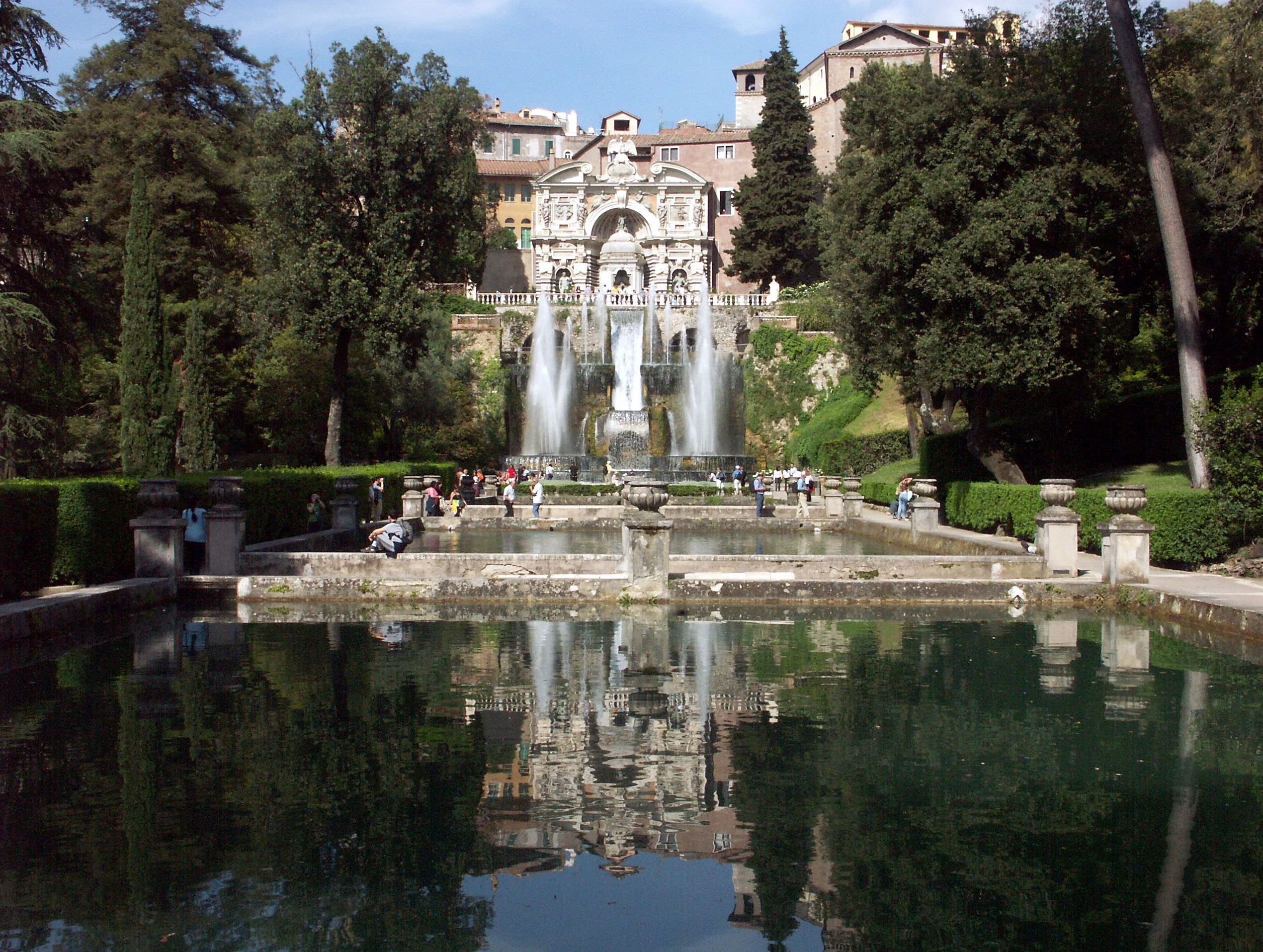
Villa d'Este

- Bomarzo
- Hadrian's Villa
- Villa d'Este
- Giardino Giusti
- Reggia di Caserta
- Boboli Gardens
- Villa Gamberaia
- Villa Lante
- Villa Massei

=== Japan ===
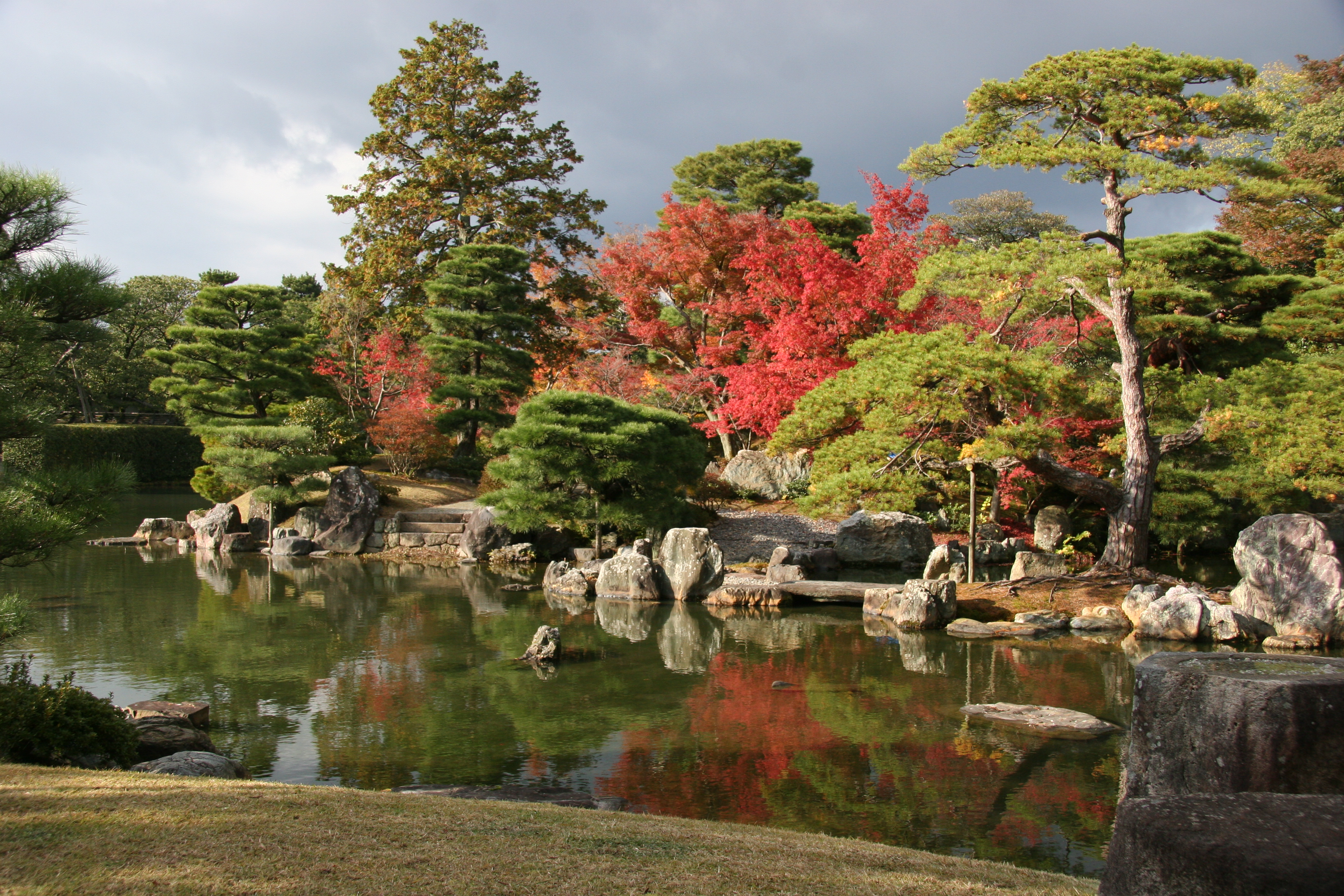
Katsura Imperial Villa

- Daisen-in
- Ryōan-ji
- Katsura Imperial Villa
- Shugakuin Imperial Villa

=== Malaysia ===
- KLCC Park, Kuala Lumpur

=== Mexico ===
- Alameda Central, Mexico City (1592)
- Jardín Borda, Cuernavaca (1783)

=== Netherlands ===
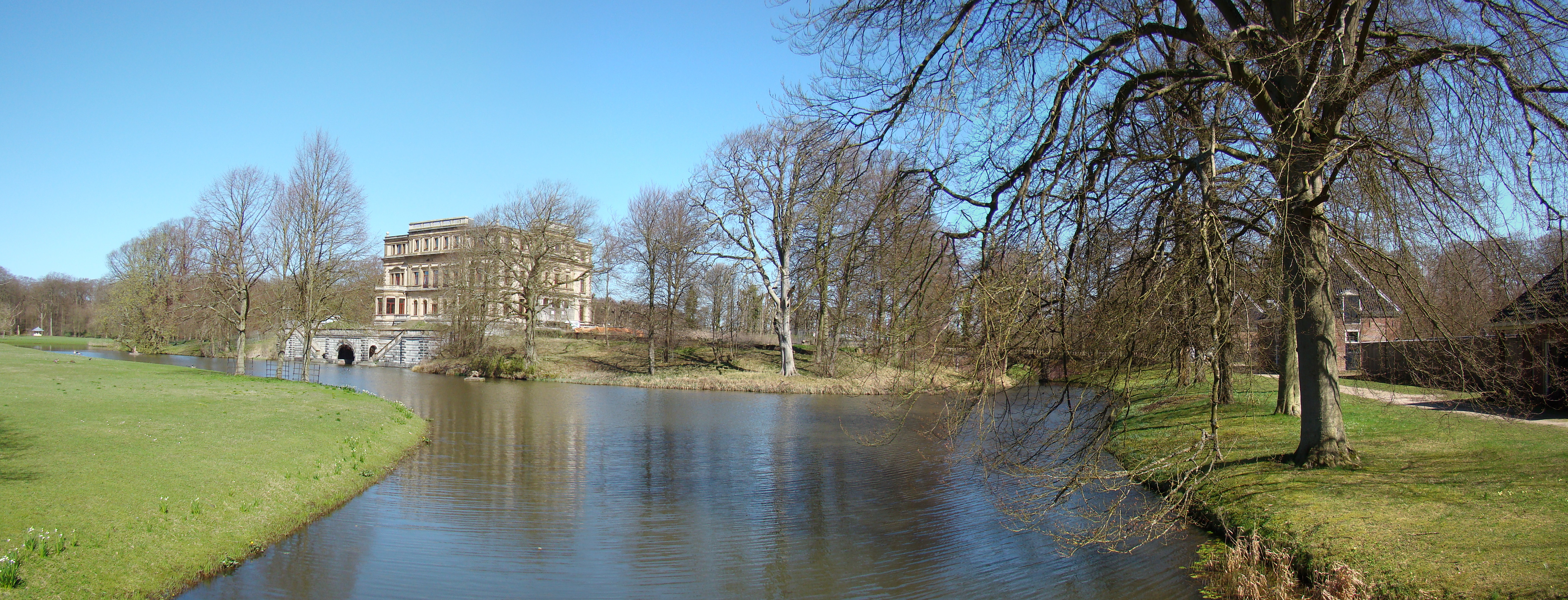
Elswout

- Elswout near Haarlem
- Het Loo Palace
- Gardens of Twickel Castle, Weldam Castle and Warmelo Castle in Hof van Twente
- Gardens of Mien Ruys in Dedemsvaart
- Garden of Piet Oudolf in Hummelo

=== Norway ===
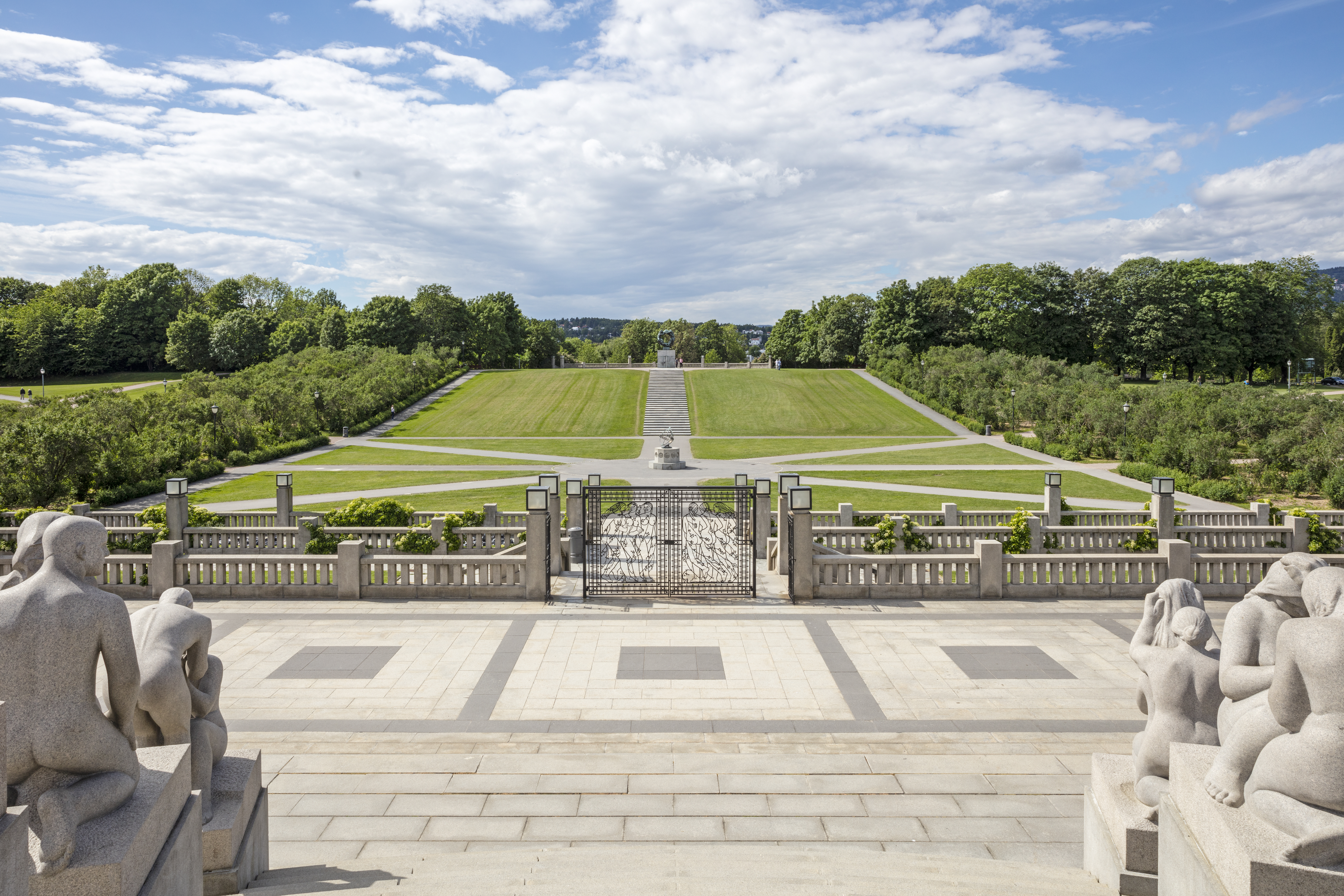
Frogner Park

- Frogner Park
- Palace Park
- Nygårdsparken

=== Pakistan ===
- Shalimar Gardens (Lahore)

=== Peru ===
- Alameda de los Descalzos, Lima (1611)

=== Poland ===
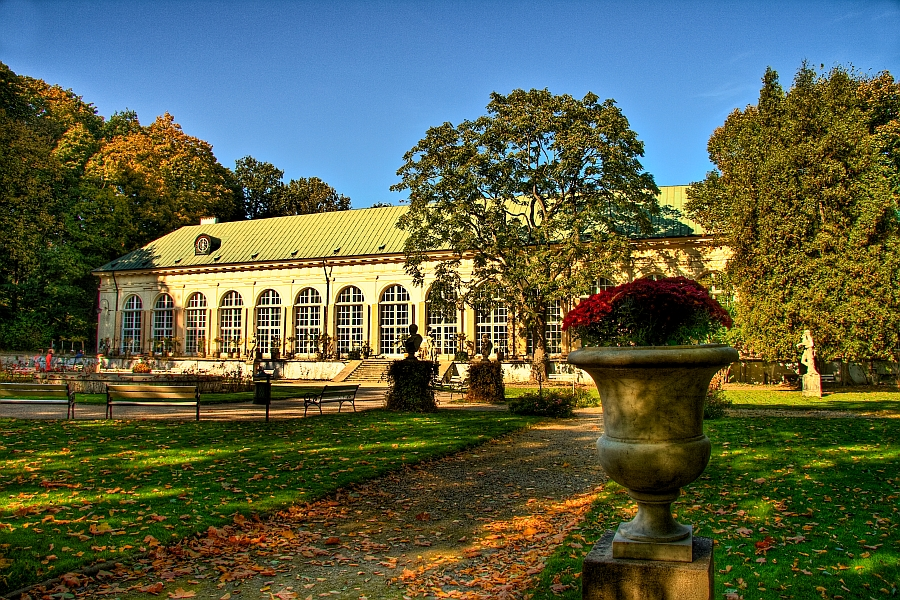
Łazienki Park

- Arkadia
- Baranów Sandomierski
- Krasiczyn
- Łazienki Park, Warsaw
- Muskauer Park
- Nieborów
- Saxon Garden, Warsaw
- Wilanów

=== Russia ===
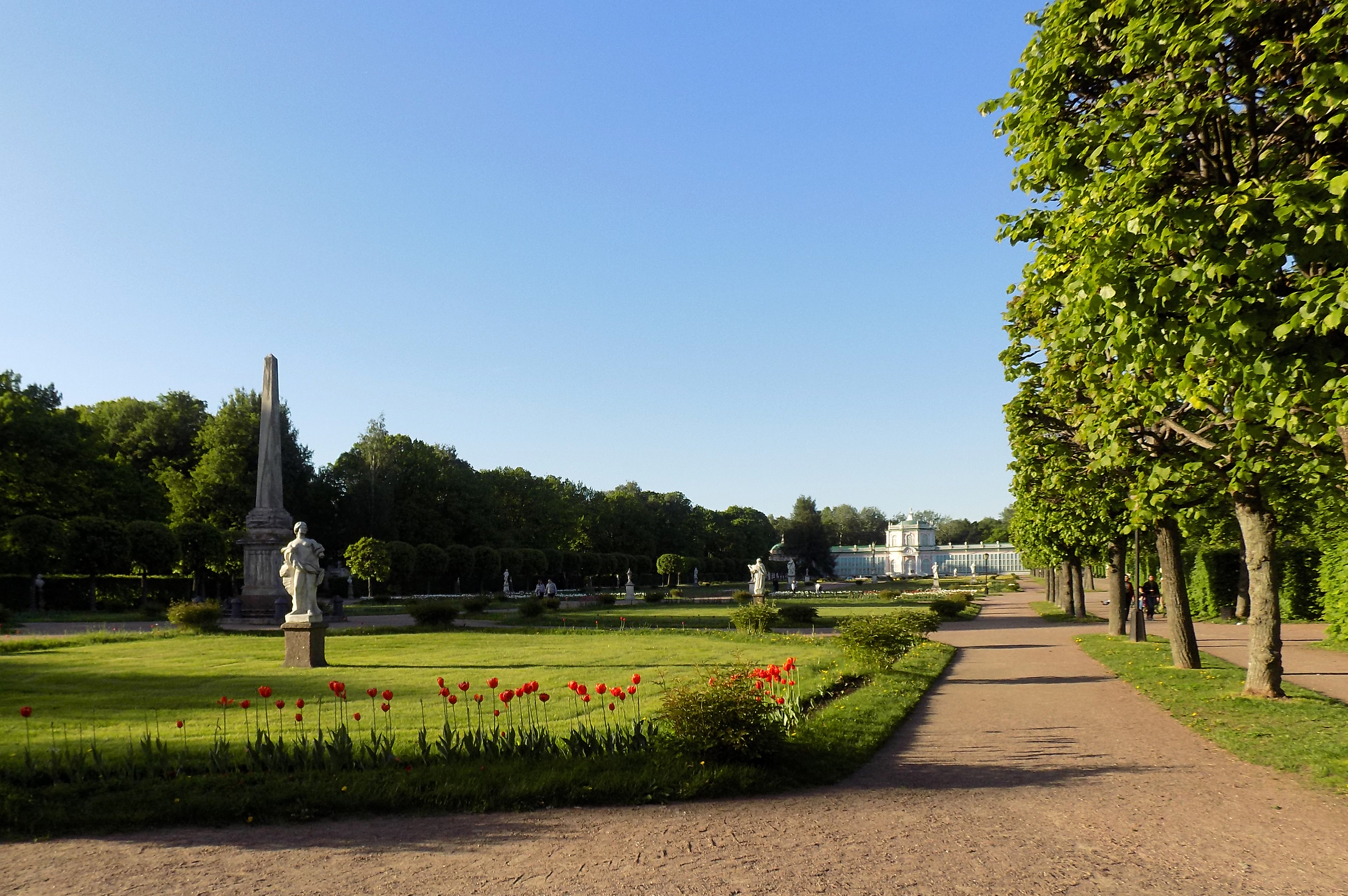
Park in Kuskovo

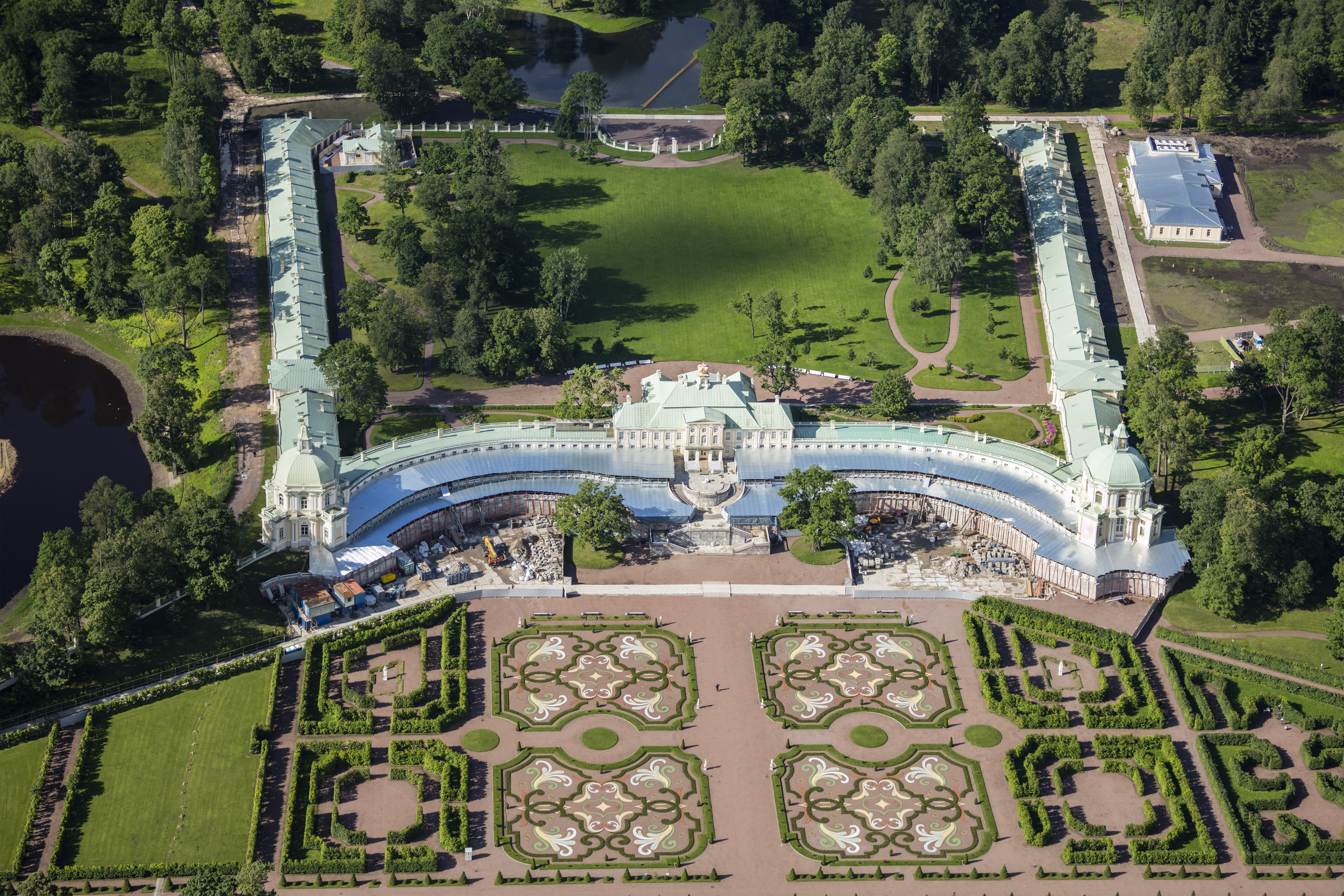
Oranienbaum, the Grand Menshikov Palace gardens

- Kuskovo
- Arkhangelskoye Estate
- Tsaritsyno
- Oranienbaum
- Ostafyevo
- Vlakhernskoye-Kuzminki
- Pavlovsk
- Peterhof Palace
- Summer Garden
- Monrepo
- Lyublino

=== Scotland ===
==== Public gardens ====
- Royal Botanic Garden Edinburgh, Edinburgh (1670)

=== Spain ===
==== Public gardens ====
- La Alameda de Hércules, Seville (1574)
- Paseo de San Pablo de Écija (Sevilla) (1578) (destroyed)
- Real Jardín Botánico de Madrid (1781)

==== Private gardens ====
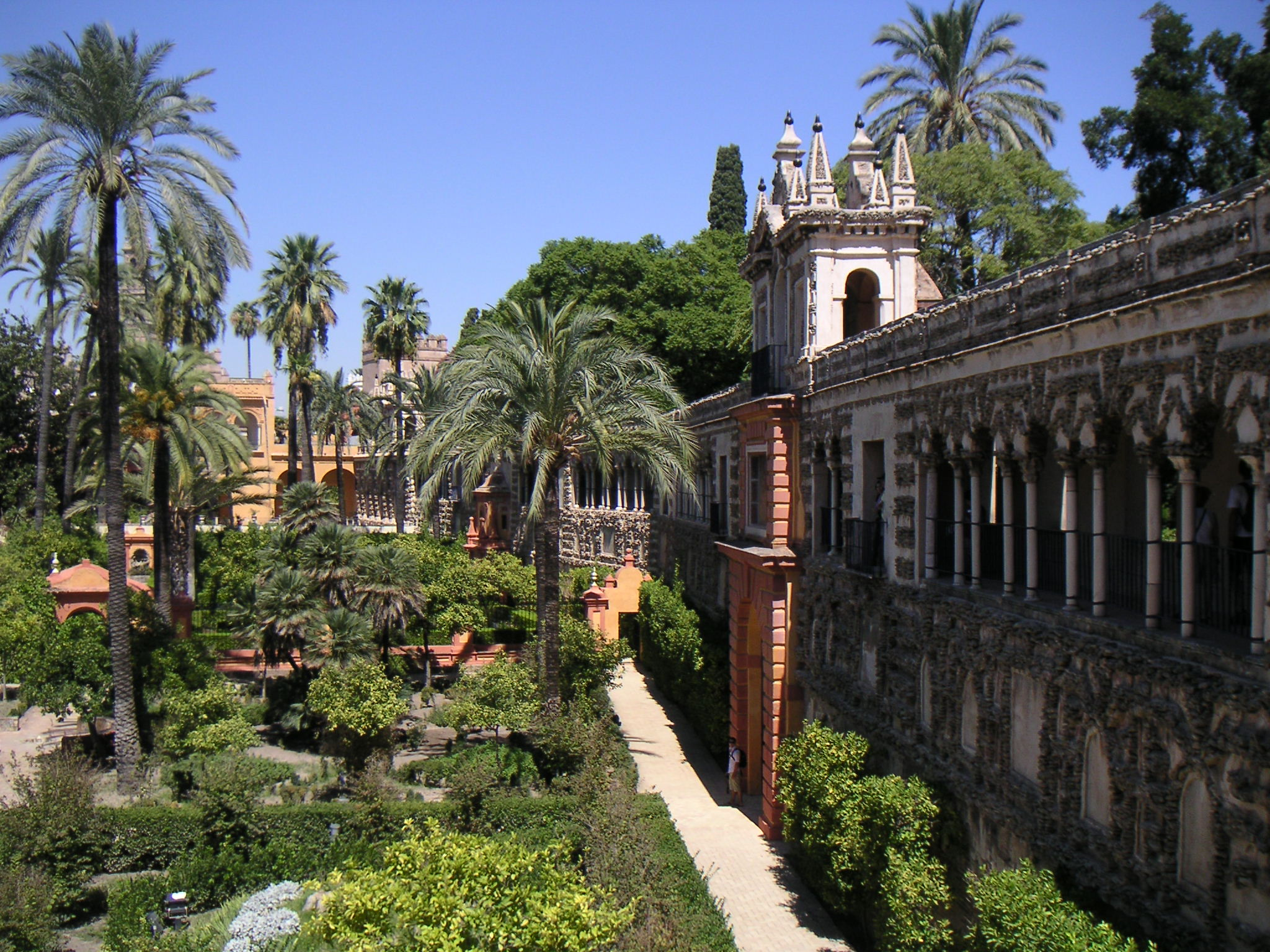
Real Alcázar de Sevilla

- Alhambra. A Royal park that was closed to the public.
- Real Alcázar de Sevilla. A Royal park that was closed to the public.
- Monforte
- Laberinto de Horta
- El Capricho de la Alameda de Osuna
- La Concepción
- El Retiro. A Royal park that was closed to the public.
- Fábrica de Paños de Brihuega
- Pazo de Oca

=== Sweden ===
==== Public gardens ====
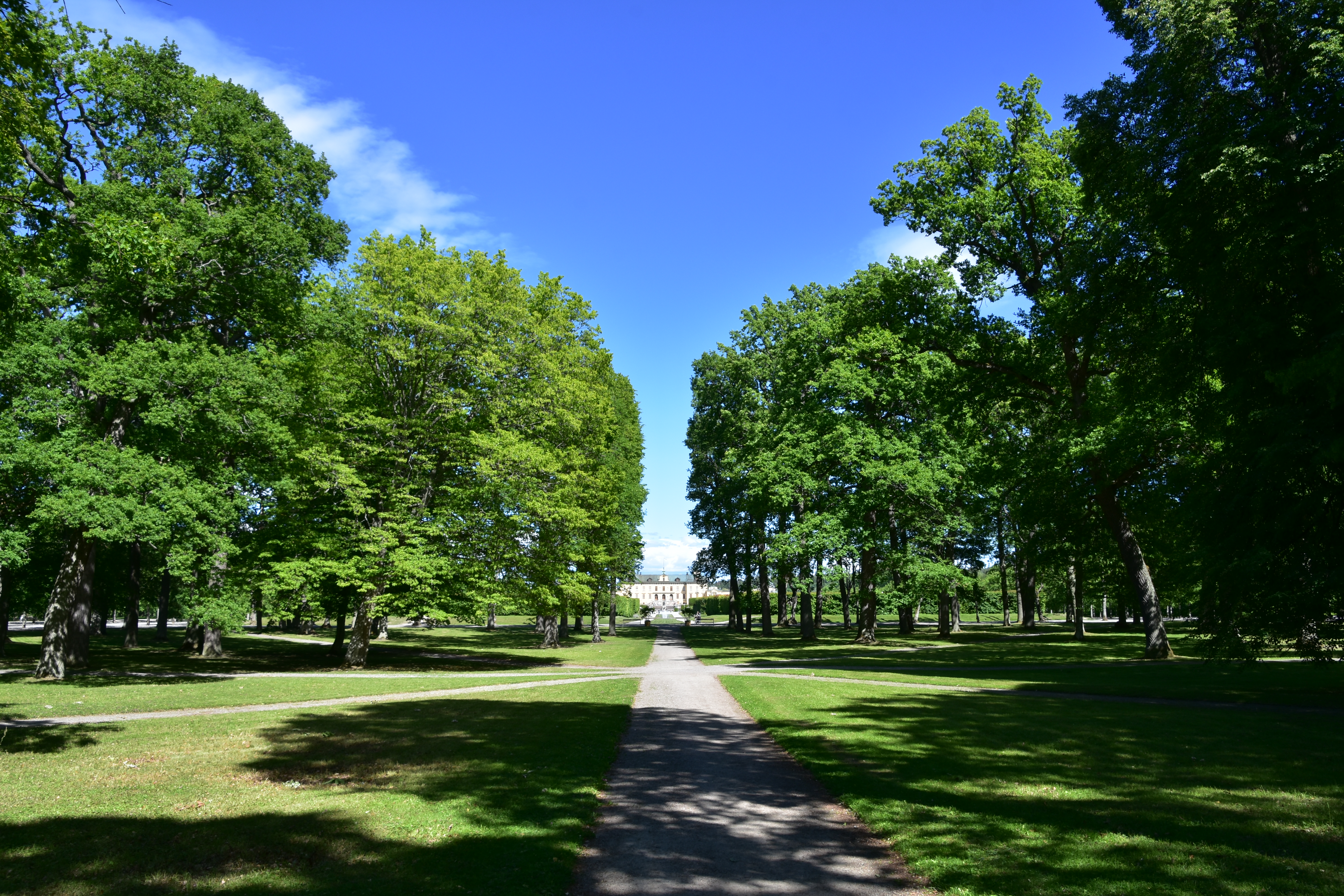
The park at Drottningholm Palace

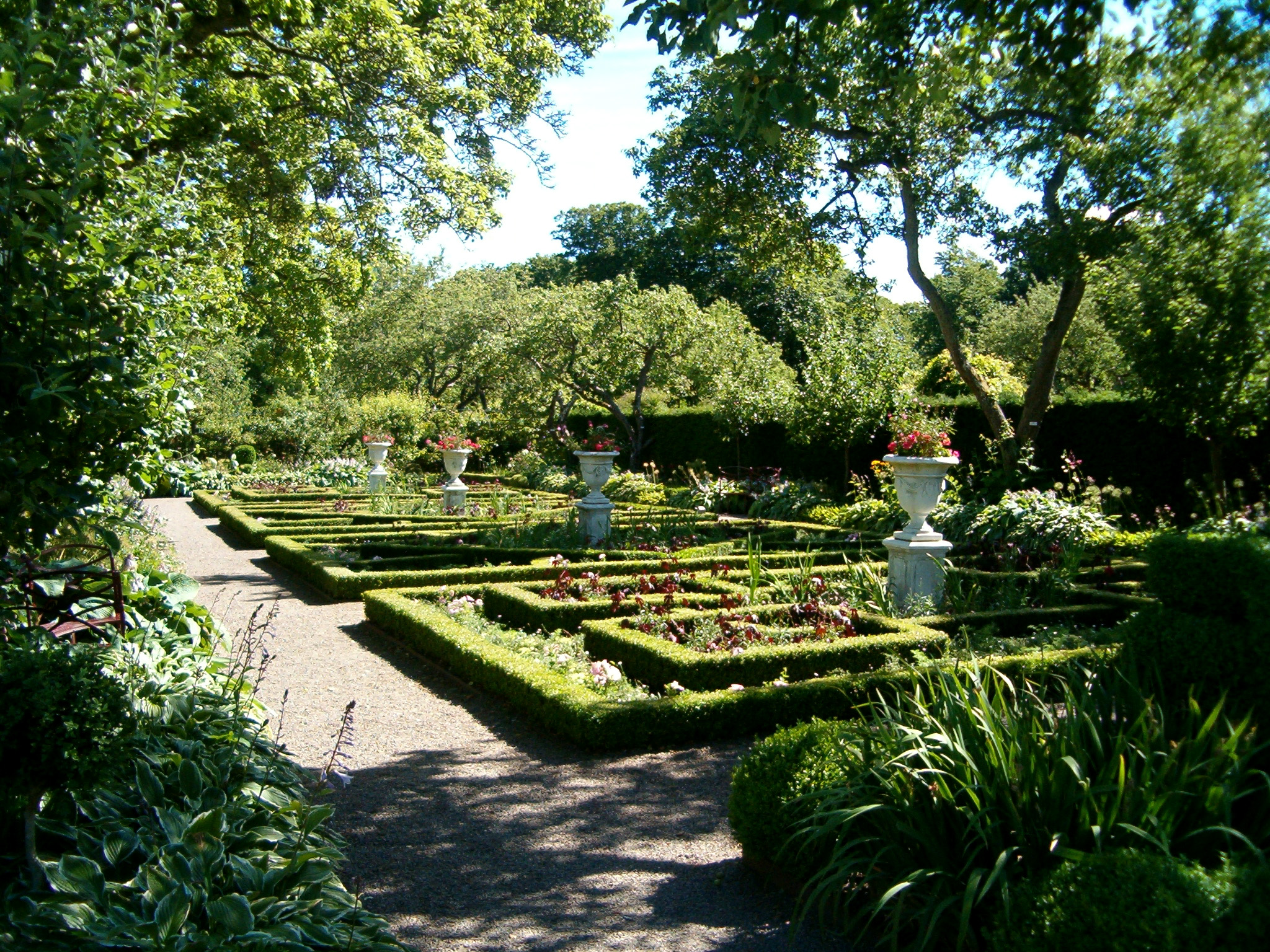
Sofiero Palace garden

- Bergianska trädgården
- Botaniska trädgården (Lund)
- Botaniska trädgården (Uppsala)
- Drottningholm Palace
- Gothenburg Botanical Garden
- Hagaparken
- Linnaean Garden
- Linnaeus Hammarby
- Norrviken Gardens
- Sofiero Palace

=== Ukraine ===
- A.V. Fomin Botanical Garden
- Kremenets Botanical Garden
- Sofiyivsky Park
- M.M. Gryshko National Botanical Garden

=== United States ===
==== Public gardens ====
- Central Park, New York City
- Boston Common, Boston, (1830)
- Golden Gate Park, San Francisco (1860)

==== Private gardens ====
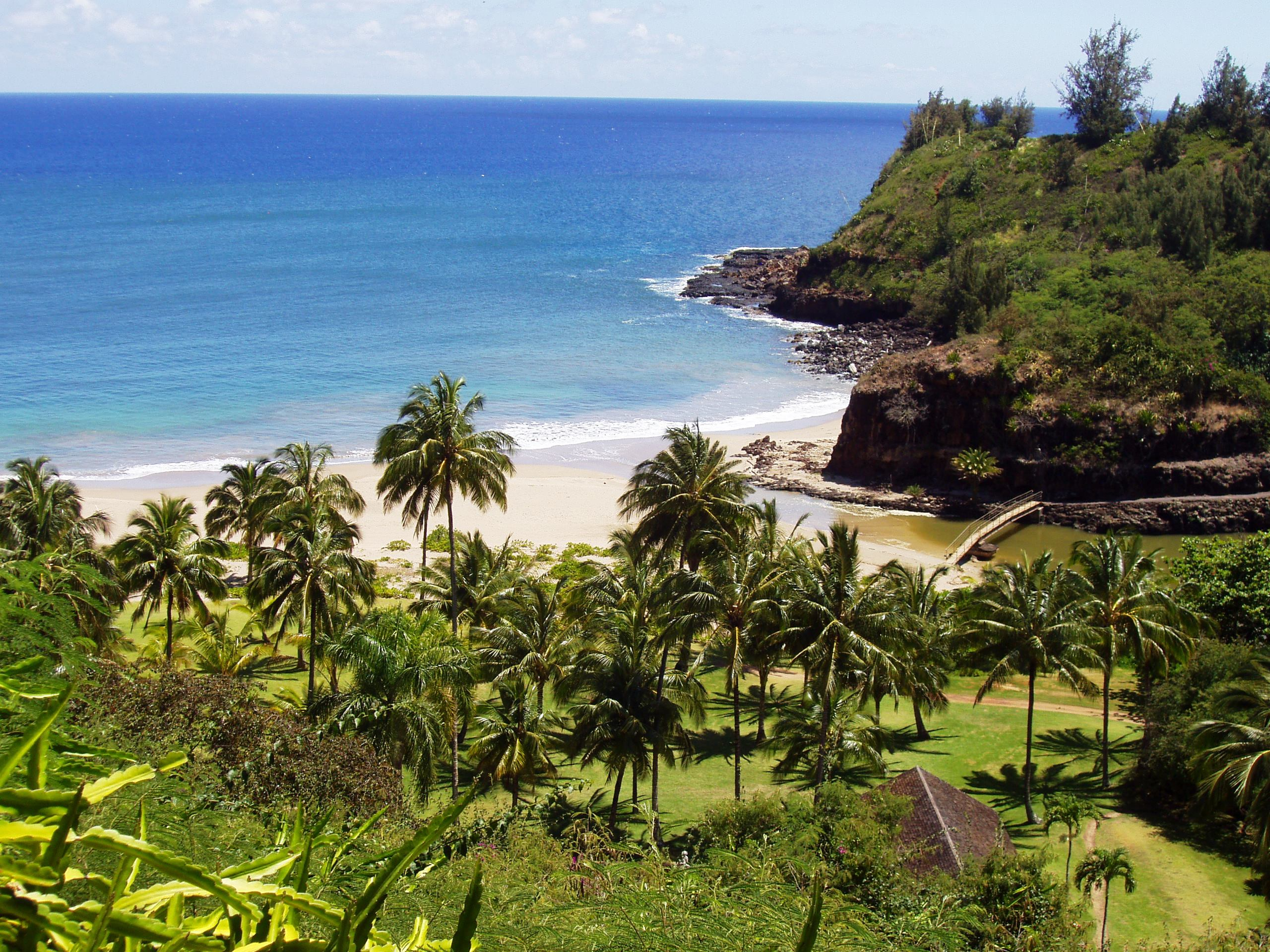
Allerton Garden, view from above

- Dumbarton Oaks, Washington, D.C.
- Huntington Gardens, San Marino
- Lotusland, Montecito
- Casa del Herrero, Montecito
- Filoli, Woodside
- Ruth Bancroft Garden, Walnut Creek
- Allerton Garden, Kauaʻi, Hawaii
- Longwood Gardens, Kennett Square, Pennsylvania
- Nemours Mansion and Gardens, Wilmington, Delaware
- Winterthur Museum and Country Estate, Winterthur, Delaware
- Fair Lane, Dearborn, Michigan
- Gaukler Point, Grosse Pointe Shores, Michigan
- Meadowburn Farm (Helena Rutherfurd Ely), Vernon Township, New Jersey.

=== Venezuela ===
- Parque del Este, Caracas

== See also ==
- Index of gardening articles (primary resource)
- Landscape design history
- Gardens by country
- List of garden types
- Landscape Institute
- Museum of Garden History
- Australian Garden History Society
- The Garden Conservancy
- Garden tourism
- Historic garden conservation
