= Cornelius Gunn House =

- U.S. National Register of Historic Places
- New Jersey Register of Historic Places
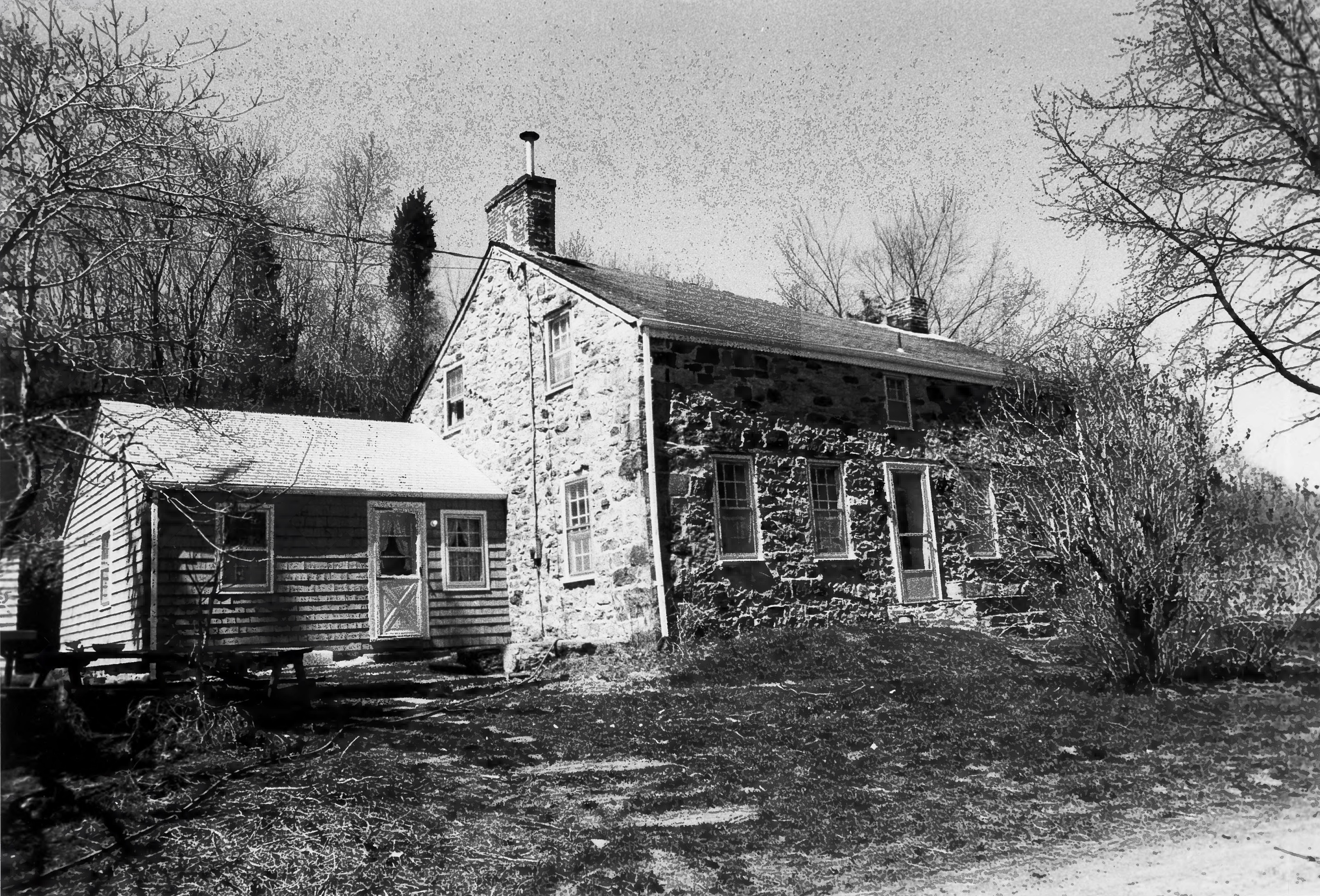

- Location within Sussex County, New Jersey Location within New Jersey Location within the United States
- Location: Ridge Road, southwest of Wallpack Center, New Jersey
- Coordinates: 41°09′07″N 74°54′03″W
- Built: c. 1814
- Built by: John Shoemaker
- NRHP reference No.: 79000238
- NJRHP No.: 2640

Significant dates
- Added to NRHP: July 23, 1979
- Designated NJRHP: March 29, 1979

The Cornelius Gunn House was a historic fieldstone farmhouse located on Ridge Road southwest of the Wallpack Center section of Walpack Township in Sussex County, New Jersey, United States. It was added to the National Register of Historic Places on July 23, 1979, for its significance in architecture. The farmstead is part of the Delaware Water Gap National Recreation Area.

According to the nomination form, the house was built around 1814 by John Shoemaker. He was the brother of Daniel Shoemaker, who built the nearby Shoemaker–Houck Farm. The house was later owned by Cornelius D. Gunn, a trustee of the Wallpack Center Methodist Episcopal Church.

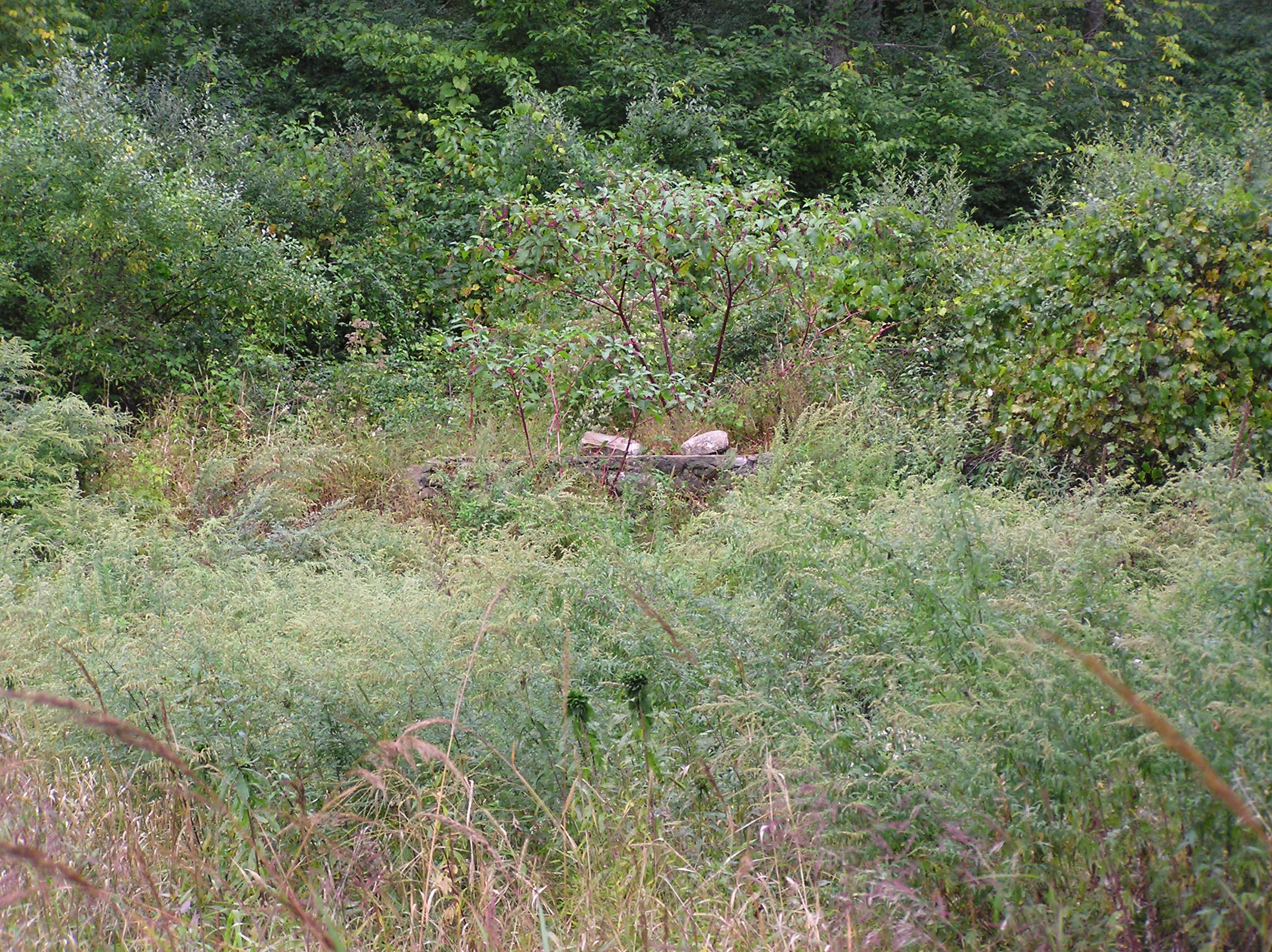
House site

== See also ==
- National Register of Historic Places listings in Sussex County, New Jersey
