= Helena Rutherfurd Ely =

American amateur gardener and writer

- Born: Helena Rutherfurd; September 28, 1858
- Died: May 18, 1920 (aged 61)
- Occupation(s): Author, gardener

Helena Ely Fairchild (née Rutherfurd; September 28, 1858 – May 18, 1920) was an American amateur gardener, founding member of the Garden Club of America, and writer, whose three books influenced American and British gardeners to avoid Victorian formal gardens in favor of plantings that embodied an "informal and sensual style." She focused on planning her gardens around planting "hardy perennial plants found in the agricultural landscape."

== Biography ==
"Arch over rose-walk, covered with Golden Honeysuckle and Clematis paniculata. September fifteenth" from A Woman's Hardy Garden (1903) Photo by C. F. Chandler.

Helena Rutherfurd was born on September 28, 1858, one of five children from the marriage of Charlotte Livingston (1825–1894) and John Rutherfurd (1810–1871), a coal and railroad industry executive, and president of the Board of Proprietors for East New Jersey and the New Jersey Historical Society.

At Meadowburn, she created formal and cottage gardens on five acres of the estate's grounds which served as the basis for a series of three books on gardening in which she favored perennials. Her first book, A Woman's Hardy Garden (1903) sold 40,000 copies and was reprinted 16 times before going out of print in 1930. The book was widely heralded as the most influential practical garden book written by an American woman. Her books promoted an informal and sensual style, which moved away from the Victorian practice of ''bedding out'' showy annuals in formal gardens. They gave permission to individuals to do physical garden work due to her social position; and encouraged women to garden.

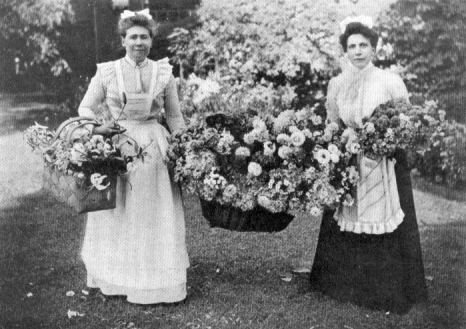
Bringing in the flowers, from A Woman's Hardy Garden, 1903

In 1904, Ely was one of the founding members of the Garden Club of America and was one of its first vice presidents.

Helena Fairchild died on May 18, 1920, aged 61. She was buried in Warwick Cemetery in Warwick, New York. She received fan mail and queries from fellow gardeners 20 years after her death.

== Meadowburn Farm ==
Ely and her husband owned a 350-acre country estate named Meadowburn Farm in Vernon Township, New Jersey. Part of Meadowburn was given to Ely by her mother as a wedding gift in 1881. The remainder, including the main house was purchased by Ely from the DeKay family, a colonial family that had settled in this area in the 1720s and played a prominent role in the New York–New Jersey Line War. The Rutherfurd family owned large tracts throughout Sussex County and was descended from early colonial proprietors. Ely spent half of each year on the farm, experimenting with filling plots with the perennial plants.

In 1930, the property was sold to the Coster family who employed Ely's gardener, Albert Furman, to maintain the property. Under Furman and later his son's guidance, the property retained a great number of Ely's plantings.

On August 9, 1993, Meadowburn Farm was placed on the National Register of Historic Places to recognize Helena Rutherfurd Ely's contributions to gardening.

== Personal life ==
On June 17, 1880, at Trinity Church, in Newark, New Jersey, she married Alfred Ely II (1852–1914), son of Lucy Cooley and Alfred Brewster Ely, who was an attorney and partner in the New York City law firm Agar, Ely & Fulton. They had two children: a son Alfred (III) (1884–1959) and daughter Helena (1881–1970). After her husband's death, Helena Ely married Benjamin T. Fairchild in 1916.

== Works ==
- 1903: A Woman's Hardy Garden
- 1905: Another Hardy Garden Book
- 1911: The Practical Flower Garden

== See also ==
- National Register of Historic Places listings in Sussex County, New Jersey
