= Richard Layton House =

- U.S. National Register of Historic Places
- New Jersey Register of Historic Places
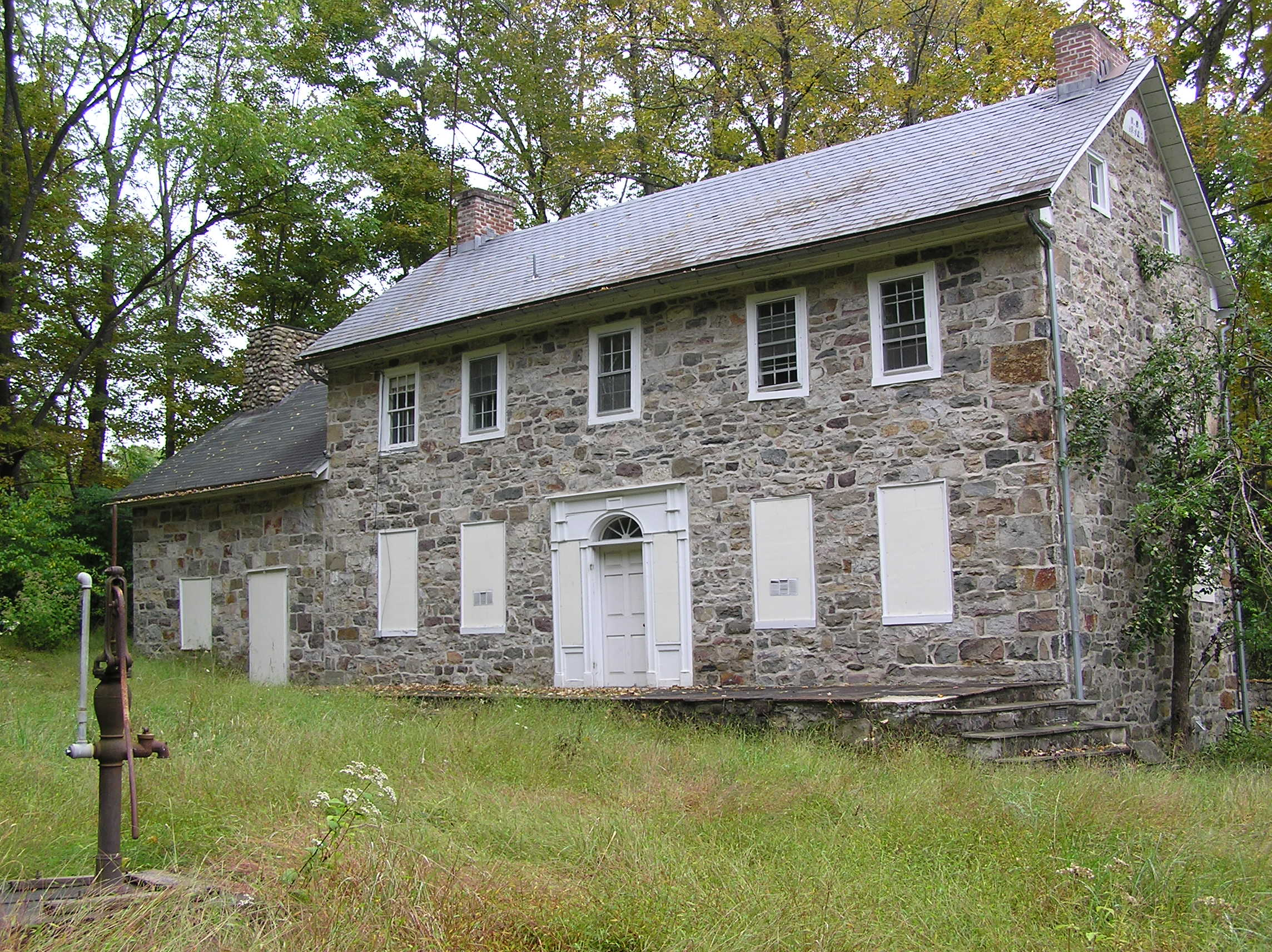

- Location within Sussex County, New Jersey Location within New Jersey Location within the United States
- Location: Southwest of Wallpack Center, New Jersey
- Coordinates: 41°08′53″N 74°54′14″W
- Area: 5.4 acres (2.2 ha)
- NRHP reference No.: 79000237
- NJRHP No.: 2641

Significant dates
- Added to NRHP: July 23, 1979
- Designated NJRHP: March 29, 1979

The Richard Layton House is a historic farmhouse located in the valley of the Delaware River southwest of the Wallpack Center section of Walpack Township in Sussex County, New Jersey, United States. It was added to the National Register of Historic Places on July 23, 1979, for its significance in architecture. The house is now part of the Delaware Water Gap National Recreation Area.

== History and description ==
The house is a two and one-half story stone building constructed in the early 19th century with traditional country style. It has a one and one-half story wing, which may be the original part. Richard Layton is likely part of the family descending from Thomas Layton, who settled in Sandyston Township in 1790.

== See also ==
- National Register of Historic Places listings in Sussex County, New Jersey
