= Andrew Snable House =

Historic house in New Jersey, United States

- U.S. National Register of Historic Places
- New Jersey Register of Historic Places
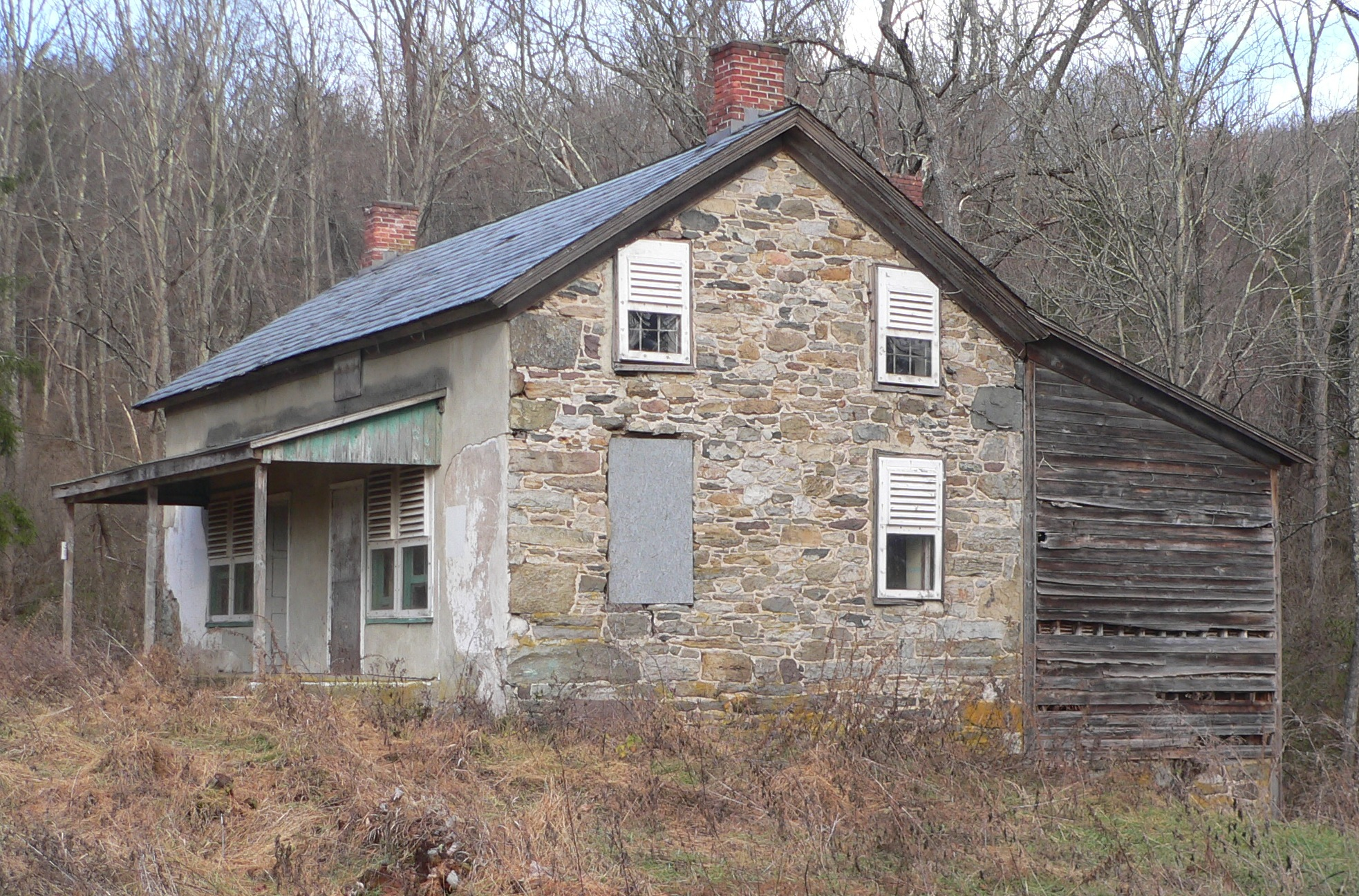
- The Andrew Snable House in 2011

- Location within Sussex County, New Jersey Location within New Jersey Location within the United States
- Location: Sandyston-Haney's Mill Road; Walpack Township, New Jersey
- Nearest city: Wallpack Center, New Jersey
- Coordinates: 41°10′11″N 74°52′15″W
- Area: 1.3 acres (0.53 ha)
- Built: 1801
- NRHP reference No.: 79000236
- NJRHP No.: 2643

Significant dates
- Added to NRHP: July 23, 1979
- Designated NJRHP: March 26, 1978

The Andrew Snable House is a historic house located on Sandyston-Haney's Mill Road near Wallpack Center in Walpack Township of Sussex County, New Jersey. It was added to the National Register of Historic Places on July 23, 1979, for its significance in architecture and exploration/settlement.

== History and description ==
The house was probably built c. 1801 by Andrew Snable. The property is along the Flat Brook, a tributary of the Delaware River. The land was once owned by Colonel John Rosenkrans, a prominent local militia leader during the American Revolution. Andrew Snable bought the land for the house from Rosenkrans' son Levi in 1801.

The house is a 1 1/2-story stone cabin measuring 36 feet by 20 feet. It is notable for being one of the best-preserved stone cottages in the area, which preceded the larger framed farmhouses that were built from the mid-1800s on.

== See also ==
- National Register of Historic Places listings in Sussex County, New Jersey
