= Elias Van Bunschooten House =

Historic house in New Jersey, United States

- U.S. National Register of Historic Places
- New Jersey Register of Historic Places
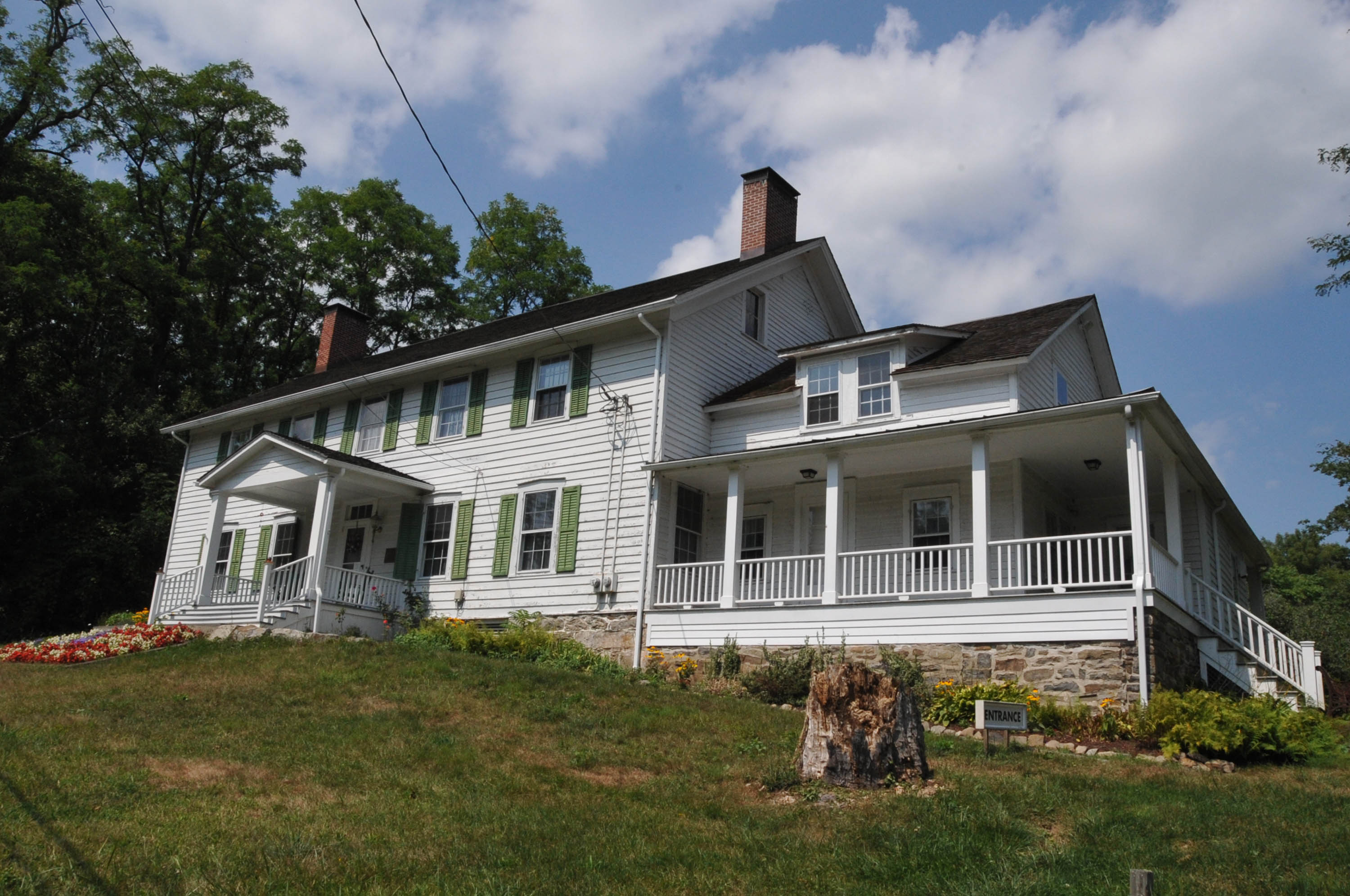

- Location within Sussex County, New Jersey Location within New Jersey Location within the United States
- Location: 1097 NJ Route 23, Wantage Township, New Jersey
- Coordinates: 41°15′51″N 74°38′11″W
- Area: 6.5 acres (2.6 ha)
- Built: 1787
- Architectural style: Federal
- NRHP reference No.: 74001191
- NJRHP No.: 2647

Significant dates
- Added to NRHP: November 1, 1974
- Designated NJRHP: July 1, 1974

The Elias Van Bunschooten House is located at 1097 NJ Route 23 in Wantage Township in Sussex County, New Jersey, United States. The Federal style house was built in 1787. The property was donated to the Chinkchewunska Chapter of the Daughters of the American Revolution in 1971 for use as the DAR Van Bunschooten Museum. It was added to the National Register of Historic Places on November 1, 1974, for its significance in religion.

== History and description ==
Elias Van Bunschooten was a Dutch Reformed Church of America minister, serving the congregations of Maghagamack, Minisink and Walpack, from 1785 until his death in 1815. He organized the Clove Church, now the First Presbyterian Church of Wantage, in 1787. The listing also includes several outbuildings: a cattle barn, wagon house, ice house, and privy.

== See also ==
- National Register of Historic Places listings in Sussex County, New Jersey
