= National Register of Historic Places listings in Sussex County, New Jersey =

Location of Sussex County in New Jersey

List of the National Register of Historic Places listings in Sussex County, New Jersey

Contents: Counties and communities in New Jersey
Atlantic – Bergen (Closter, Franklin Lakes, Ridgewood, Saddle River, Wyckoff) – Burlington – Camden – Cape May – Cumberland – Essex – Gloucester – Hudson – Hunterdon – Mercer – Middlesex – Monmouth – Morris – Ocean – Passaic – Salem – Somerset – Sussex – Union – Warren

This is intended to be a complete list of properties and districts listed on the National Register of Historic Places in Sussex County, New Jersey. Latitude and longitude coordinates of the sites listed on this page may be displayed in an online map.

This National Park Service list is complete through NPS recent listings posted May 1, 2026.

	Name on the Register	Image	Date listed	Location	City or town	Description
1	Backwards Tunnel	Backwards Tunnel	December 28, 2005 (#05001483)	Cork Hill Road, north of Passaic Avenue intersection 41°05′09″N 74°36′07″W	Ogdensburg	Built by the Midland Railroad in 1871. So called because bore for the Wallkill River is wider than that for the road.
2	Bethany Chapel	Bethany Chapel	February 29, 1980 (#80002517)	103 Hamburg Tpke. 41°08′50″N 74°34′26″W	Hamburg	1869 stone church
3	Black Creek Site	Black Creek Site	November 27, 2002 (#02000626)	Address Restricted	Vernon Township	
4	Crescent Theatre	Crescent Theatre	September 7, 2005 (#05000965)	74 Main St. 41°12′33″N 74°36′28″W	Sussex	1917 theater was local community center and one of the first in the region to show sound films in 1929. Now home to Tri-State Theater Co.
5	Erickson Lakeside Cabin	Erickson Lakeside Cabin	November 3, 2017 (#100001778)	103 Lakeside Dr., Lake Wallkill; 41°14′12″N 74°32′15″W	Vernon Township	
6	Evans–Waters Cottage	Evans–Waters Cottage	November 15, 2016 (#16000777)	11 Grandview Road, Lake Wallkill; 41°14′23″N 74°32′16″W	Vernon Township	
7	First Presbyterian Church of Wantage	First Presbyterian Church of Wantage	September 23, 1982 (#82003305)	889 NJ 23; 41°14′28″N 74°37′22″W	Wantage Township	1829 church housed one of the first congregations in Wantage, established in 1787, the Clove Church. Later changed from Reformed to Presbyterian.
8	Foster–Armstrong House	Foster–Armstrong House	July 23, 1979 (#79000235)	320 River Road; 41°18′33″N 74°47′19″W	Montague Township	
9	Cornelius Gunn House	Cornelius Gunn House	July 23, 1979 (#79000238)	Southwest of Wallpack Center on Ridge Road; 41°09′07″N 74°54′03″W	Walpack Township	
10	Harmony Hill United Methodist Church	Harmony Hill United Methodist Church	September 19, 1977 (#77000913)	N of Stillwater on Fairview Lake Rd. 41°02′33″N 74°52′54″W	Stillwater	
11	High Breeze Farm	High Breeze Farm	July 27, 1989 (#89000993)	Barrett Rd. off NJ 94; 41°13′06″N 74°25′03″W	Highland Lakes	
12	High Point State Park	High Point State Park	April 23, 1996 (#96000404)	Roughly bounded by the NJ-NY state line and State Highway 23. between Port Jervis, New York and Wantage Township, New Jersey; 41°17′16″N 74°41′40″W	Montague	
13	Hill Memorial	Hill Memorial	July 18, 1985 (#85001565)	82 Main Street; 41°03′24″N 74°45′17″W	Newton	Now houses the Sussex County Historical Society
14	Hinchman–Rickey Farm	Hinchman–Rickey Farm	March 7, 2025 (#100011488)	435 and 442 Route 94; 41°12′57″N 74°27′23″W	Vernon Township	
15	Lafayette Village Historic District	Lafayette Village Historic District	December 31, 2013 (#13001024)	NJ 15, Morris Farm Road and Meadows Road; 41°05′53″N 74°41′18″W	Lafayette Township	
16	Lawrence Mansion	Lawrence Mansion	November 2, 1979 (#79001522)	W of Hamburg on NJ 94; 41°09′09″N 74°35′14″W	Hamburg	1841 Greek Revival mansion now used as commercial property
17	Richard Layton House	Richard Layton House	July 23, 1979 (#79000237)	Southwest of Wallpack Center; 41°08′53″N 74°54′14″W	Walpack Township	
18	Log Cabin and Farm	Log Cabin and Farm	August 24, 1977 (#77000910)	N of Branchville on Mattison Avenue; 41°11′40″N 74°44′33″W	Frankford Township	Known as Rutan Farm. Rutan Log Cabin relocated to Waterloo Village in 1989.
19	Meadowburn Farm	Meadowburn Farm	August 9, 1993 (#93000748)	Address Restricted, on Meadowburn Road	Vernon Township	
20	Henry W. Merriam House	Henry W. Merriam House	December 18, 1970 (#70000396)	131 Main Street; 41°03′10″N 74°45′20″W	Newton	
21	Millville Historic and Archaeological District	Millville Historic and Archaeological District	January 30, 1984 (#84002807)	Address Restricted, in the vicinity of Millville	Montague Township	A boundary increase was approved September 22, 2025.
22	Minisink Archeological Site	Minisink Archeological Site	April 19, 1993 (#93000608)	in the vicinity of Minisink Island; 41°17′26″N 74°49′44″W	Montague Township	
23	Morris Canal	Morris Canal	October 1, 1974 (#74002228)	Irregular line beginning at Phillipsburg and ending at Jersey City; 40°41′08″N 75°09′49″W	Not Applicable	Extends through Essex County, New Jersey
24	Newton Town Plot Historic District	Newton Town Plot Historic District	November 12, 1992 (#92001521)	Church, High, Main, Moran, and Spring Streets; and Park Place; 41°03′26″N 74°45′13″W	Newton	56 contributing properties on 17 acres of varying architectural styles and historical contexts. The boundaries were determined by the "Town Plot" surveyed by Jonathan Hampton in 1762.
25	Old Mine Road Historic District	Old Mine Road Historic District	December 3, 1980 (#80000410)	NJ 521, Delaware, Old Mine, and River Roads; 41°05′20″N 74°57′40″W	Not Applicable	Extends into Warren County, New Jersey
26	Old Monroe School House	Old Monroe School House	August 12, 1977 (#77000911)	NJ 94; 41°06′57″N 74°37′58″W	Hardyston Township	Stone one-room school house
27	Peters Valley Historic District	Peters Valley Historic District	February 29, 1980 (#80000437)	Bevans, Walpack, and Kuhn Roads; 41°11′46″N 74°51′12″W	Sandyston Township	
28	Plaster Mill	Plaster Mill	August 3, 1977 (#77000912)	Off Main Street and Kelly Place; 40°54′07″N 74°42′31″W	Stanhope	
29	Casper and Abraham Shafer Grist Mill Complex	Casper and Abraham Shafer Grist Mill Complex	December 10, 2009 (#09000653)	928 Main St. 41°01′59″N 74°52′29″W	Stillwater	
30	Shoemaker–Houck Farm	Shoemaker–Houck Farm	July 23, 1979 (#79000234)	South of Wallpack Center on Haney's Mill-Wallpack Center Road; 41°08′35″N 74°52′55″W	Walpack Township	
31	Andrew Snable House	Andrew Snable House	July 23, 1979 (#79000236)	Northeast of Wallpack Center on Sandyston-Haney's Mill Road; 41°10′11″N 74°52′15″W	Walpack Township	
32	Sterling Hill Mine	Sterling Hill Mine	September 3, 1991 (#91001365)	30 Plant Street; 41°04′59″N 74°36′24″W	Ogdensburg	
33	Stockholm United Methodist Church	Stockholm United Methodist Church	March 26, 1976 (#76001189)	CR 515; 41°05′21″N 74°30′43″W	Stockholm	
34	Sussex County Courthouse	Sussex County Courthouse	July 23, 1979 (#79001523)	High and Spring Streets; 41°03′32″N 74°45′14″W	Newton	
35	Elias Van Bunschooten House	Elias Van Bunschooten House	November 1, 1974 (#74001191)	1097 NJ 23; 41°15′51″N 74°38′11″W	Wantage Township	
36	Wallpack Center Historic District	Wallpack Center Historic District	July 17, 1980 (#80000354)	Wallpack Center Road; 41°09′33″N 74°52′51″W	Walpack Township	
37	Waterloo Village	Waterloo Village	September 13, 1977 (#77000909)	Musconetcong River and Waterloo Road; 40°54′56″N 74°45′22″W	Byram Township	Also known as Andover Forge. Boundary increase April 28, 2015.
38	White Deer Plaza and Boardwalk District	White Deer Plaza and Boardwalk District	July 11, 1988 (#88001012)	White Deer Plaza, Winona Parkway, and West Shore Trail, Lake Mohawk; 41°01′56″N 74°38′28″W	Sparta	
