= Black Creek Site (28SX297) =

- U.S. National Register of Historic Places
- New Jersey Register of Historic Places
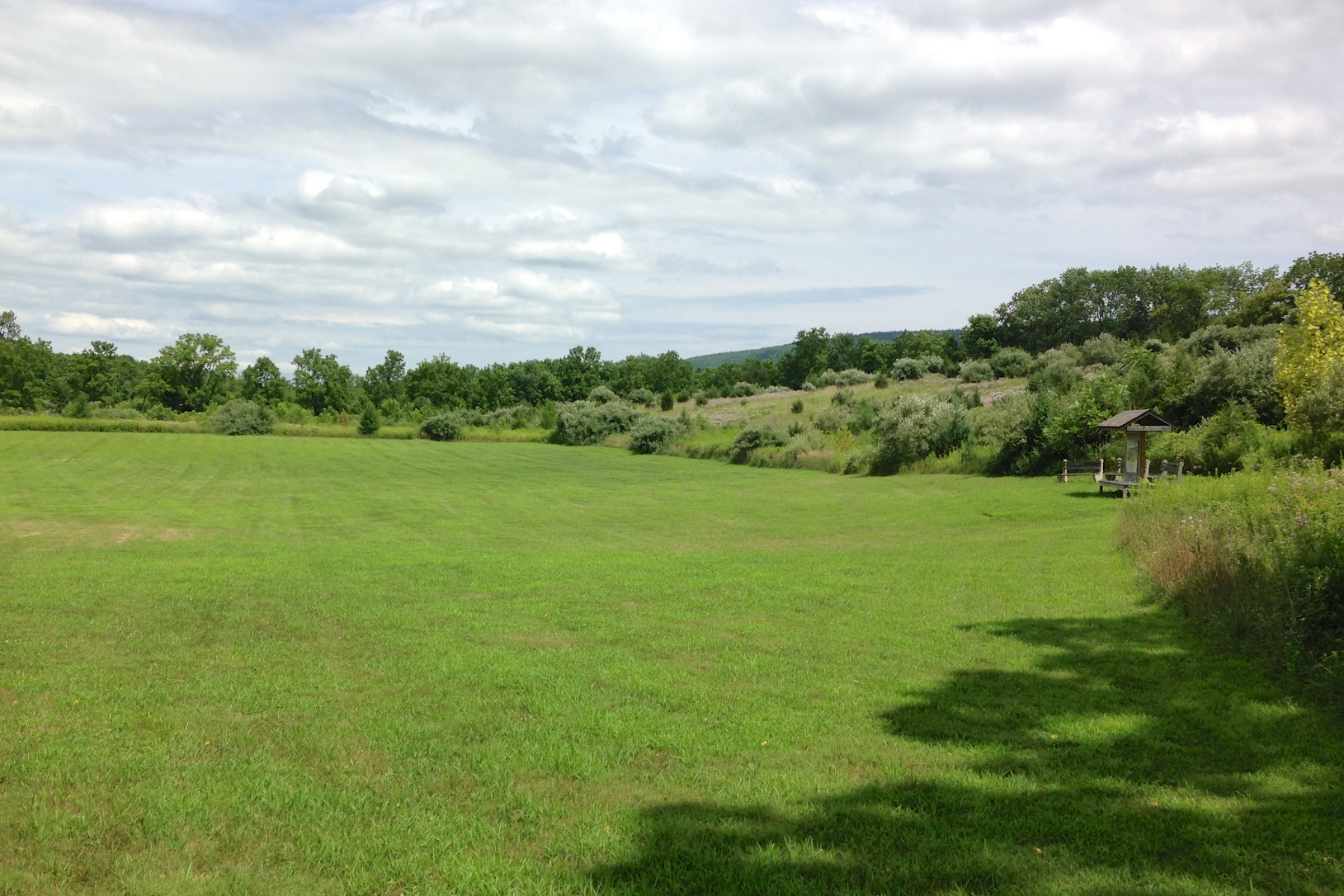
- Site area view
- Location: Vernon Township, New Jersey
- Area: 40.6 acres (16.4 ha)
- NRHP reference No.: 02000626
- NJRHP No.: 2636

Significant dates
- Added to NRHP: November 27, 2002
- Designated NJRHP: April 1, 2002

The Black Creek Site is a 40.6-acre (16.4 ha) archaeological site located along the Black Creek in Vernon Township in Sussex County, New Jersey, United States. It was added to the National Register of Historic Places on November 27, 2002, for its significance in pre-history. Containing both fields and woodlands, the site was used by Native Americans for nearly 10,000 years, starting approximately 8,000 BC.

== See also ==
- National Register of Historic Places listings in Sussex County, New Jersey
