= Millville, Sussex County, New Jersey =

Populated place in Sussex County, New Jersey, US

Millville, New Jersey
- Unincorporated community
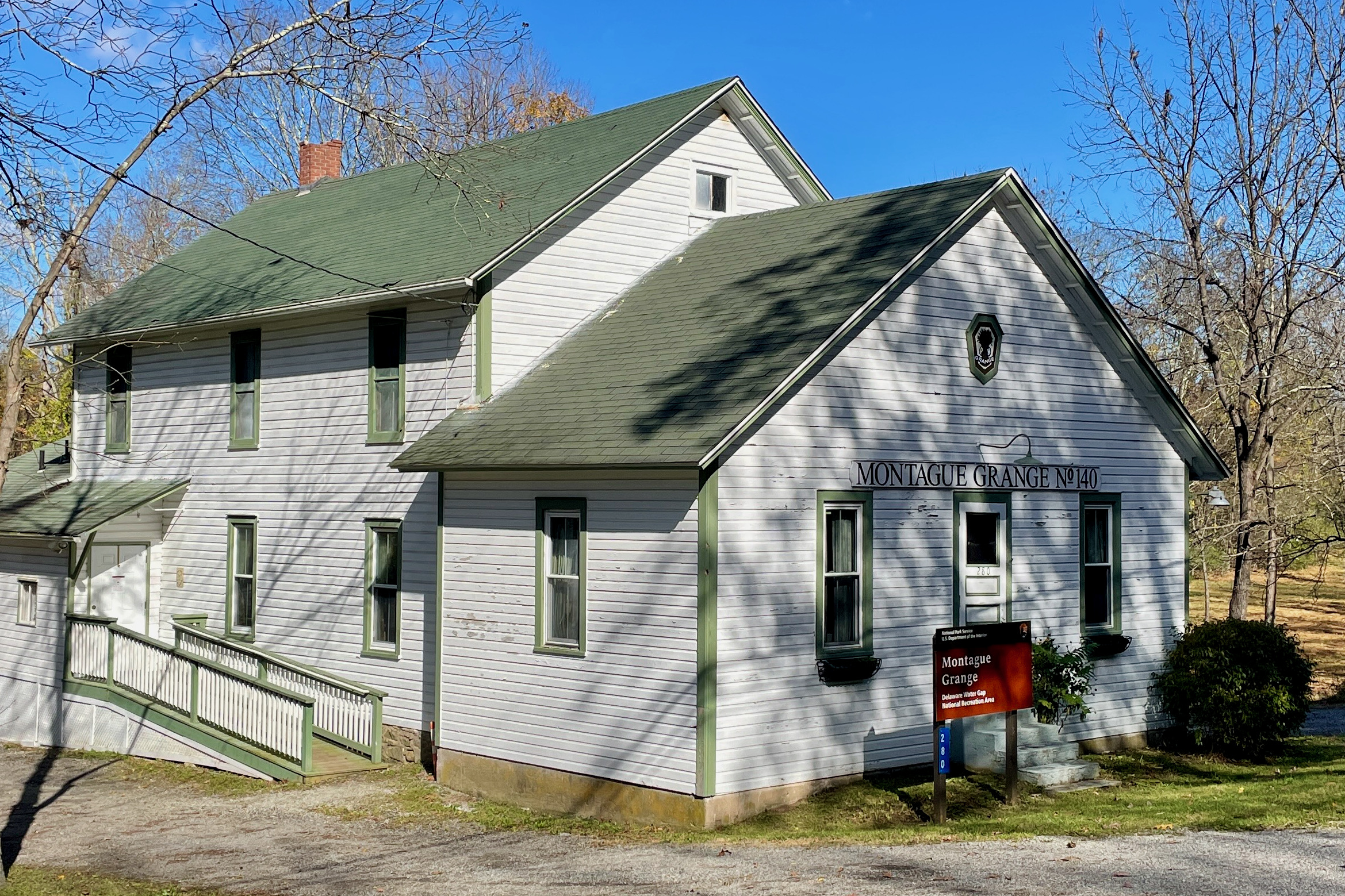
- Montague Grange No. 140

- Location within Sussex County, New Jersey Location within New Jersey Location within the United States
- Coordinates: 41°18′47″N 74°46′48″W
- Country: United States
- State: New Jersey
- County: Sussex
- Township: Montague
- GNIS feature ID: 878391

Millville is an unincorporated community located along River Road (County Route 521) and Shimers Brook in Montague Township of Sussex County, New Jersey. The Montague Grange and other parts of the community are in the Delaware Water Gap National Recreation Area.

== History ==
The community got its name from the gristmills and sawmills built along Shimers Brook, then known as Chambers Mill Brook, starting in 1722. During the American Revolutionary War, Captains Abram Shimer and James Bonell were at the fort located here to protect the mills. Shimer built a mill here c. 1750. In the 1790s, Jacob Shimer, his son, built a house on Old Mine Road, now River Road. It was documented by the Historic American Buildings Survey in 1970, before being demolished by 1980.

== Historic district ==
- Millville Historic and Archaeological District
- U.S. National Register of Historic Places
- U.S. Historic district
- New Jersey Register of Historic Places
- Area: 9.3 acres (3.8 ha)
- NRHP reference No.: 84002807 (original); 14000065 (increase)
- NJRHP No.: 2606; 5172

Significant dates
- Added to NRHP: January 30, 1984
- Boundary increase: September 22, 2025
- Designated NJRHP: November 21, 1983; November 21, 2013

The Millville Historic and Archaeological District is a 9.3-acre (3.8 ha) historic district encompassing the village. It was added to the National Register of Historic Places on January 30, 1984, for its significance in exploration/settlement, history, and industry. The district includes four contributing buildings and six contributing sites. The district boundary on the state register was increased on November 21, 2013, and lists River Road (County Route 521), Clove Road (County Route 653), Millville and Weider Roads. The county has posted a historical information sign on Clove Road.

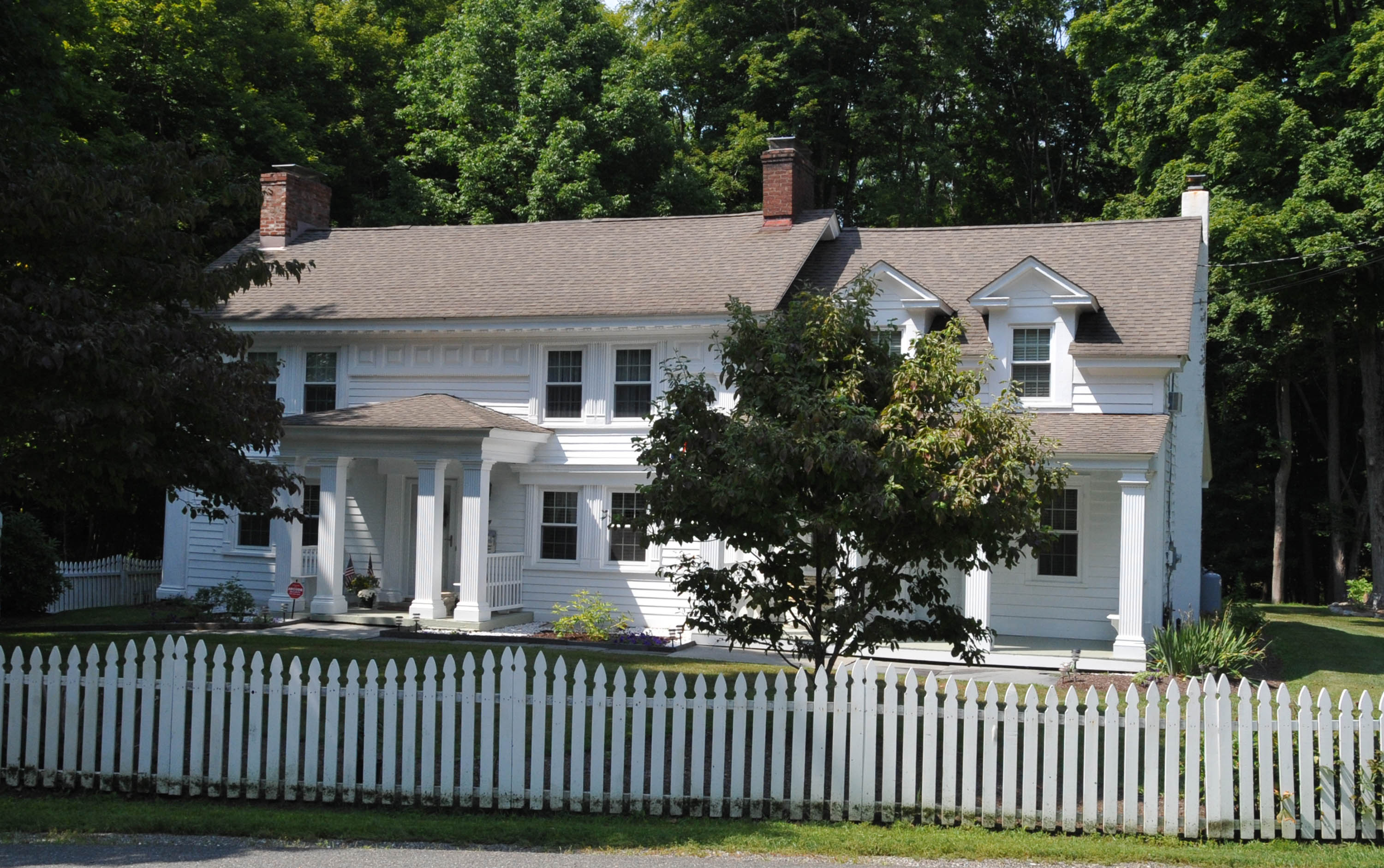
House built 1749 by Captain Abram Shimer on River Road

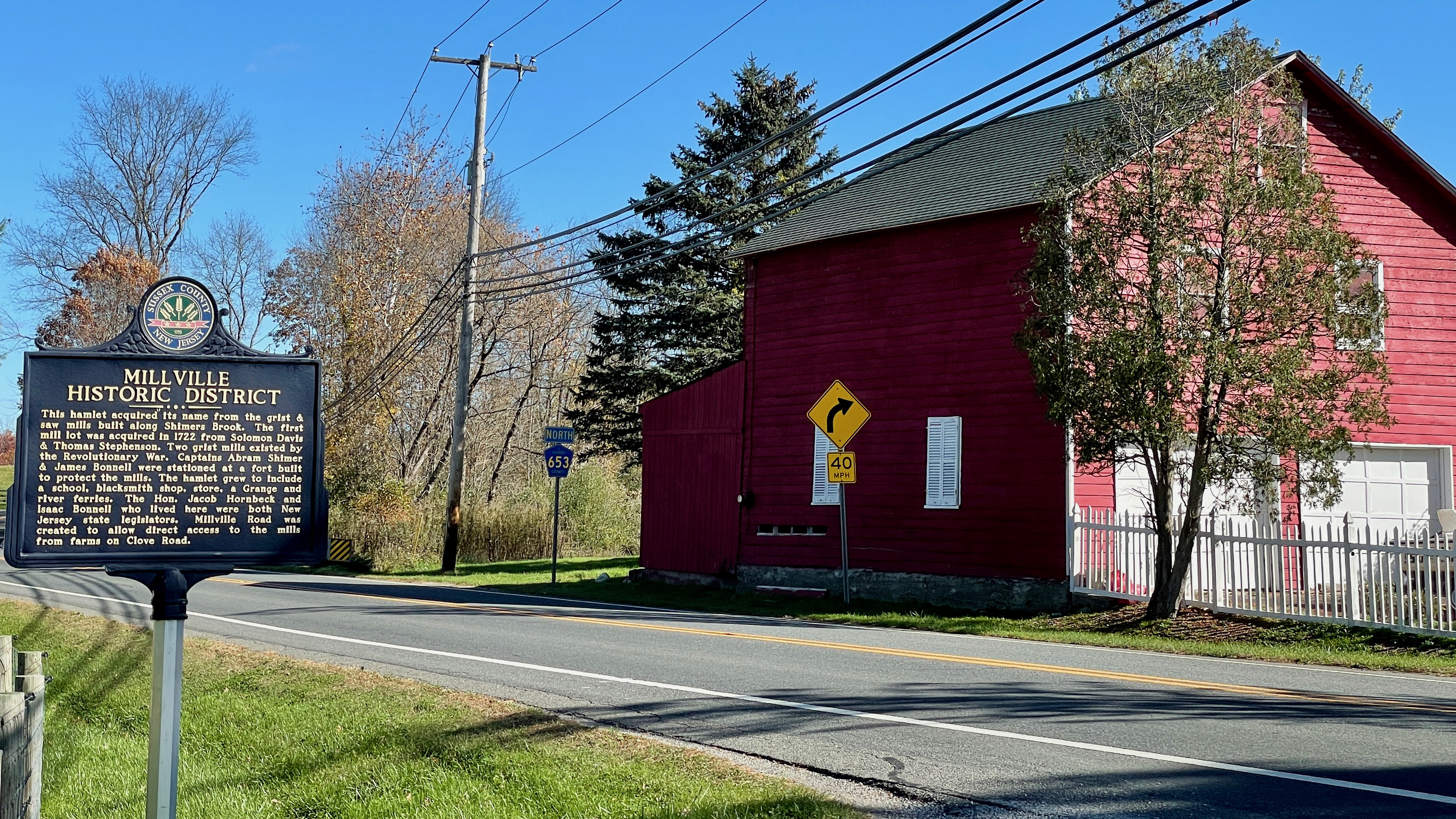
Historical information sign at the Bonnell–Westbrook wagon house on Clove Road

== See also ==
- National Register of Historic Places listings in Sussex County, New Jersey
