= Stockholm United Methodist Church =

Historic church in New Jersey, United States

- U.S. National Register of Historic Places
- New Jersey Register of Historic Places
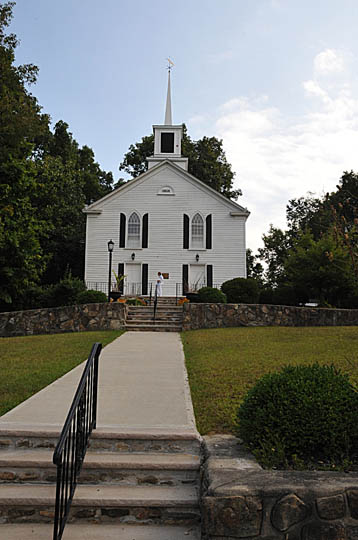

- Location within Sussex County, New Jersey Location within New Jersey Location within the United States
- Location: 38 CR 515, Stockholm, New Jersey
- Coordinates: 41°5′21″N 74°30′43″W
- Built: 1826
- NRHP reference No.: 76001189
- NJRHP No.: 2602
- Added to NRHP: March 26, 1976

The Stockholm United Methodist Church, historically known as the Bethel Methodist Episcopal Church of Snufftown, is located at 38 County Route 515 in the Stockholm section of Hardyston Township in Sussex County, New Jersey, United States. It was built in 1826 and added to the National Register of Historic Places on March 26, 1976, for its significance in religion.

== History and description ==
The Bethel Methodist Episcopal Society of Snufftown was organized in 1800. Its first church was built in 1826. The name of the community and the church were changed to Stockholm in 1872 when the New Jersey Midland Railway built a station here. A steeple with belfry was added in 1967.

== See also ==
- National Register of Historic Places listings in Sussex County, New Jersey
