= Rutan Farm =

- Log Cabin and Farm
- U.S. National Register of Historic Places
- U.S. Historic district
- New Jersey Register of Historic Places
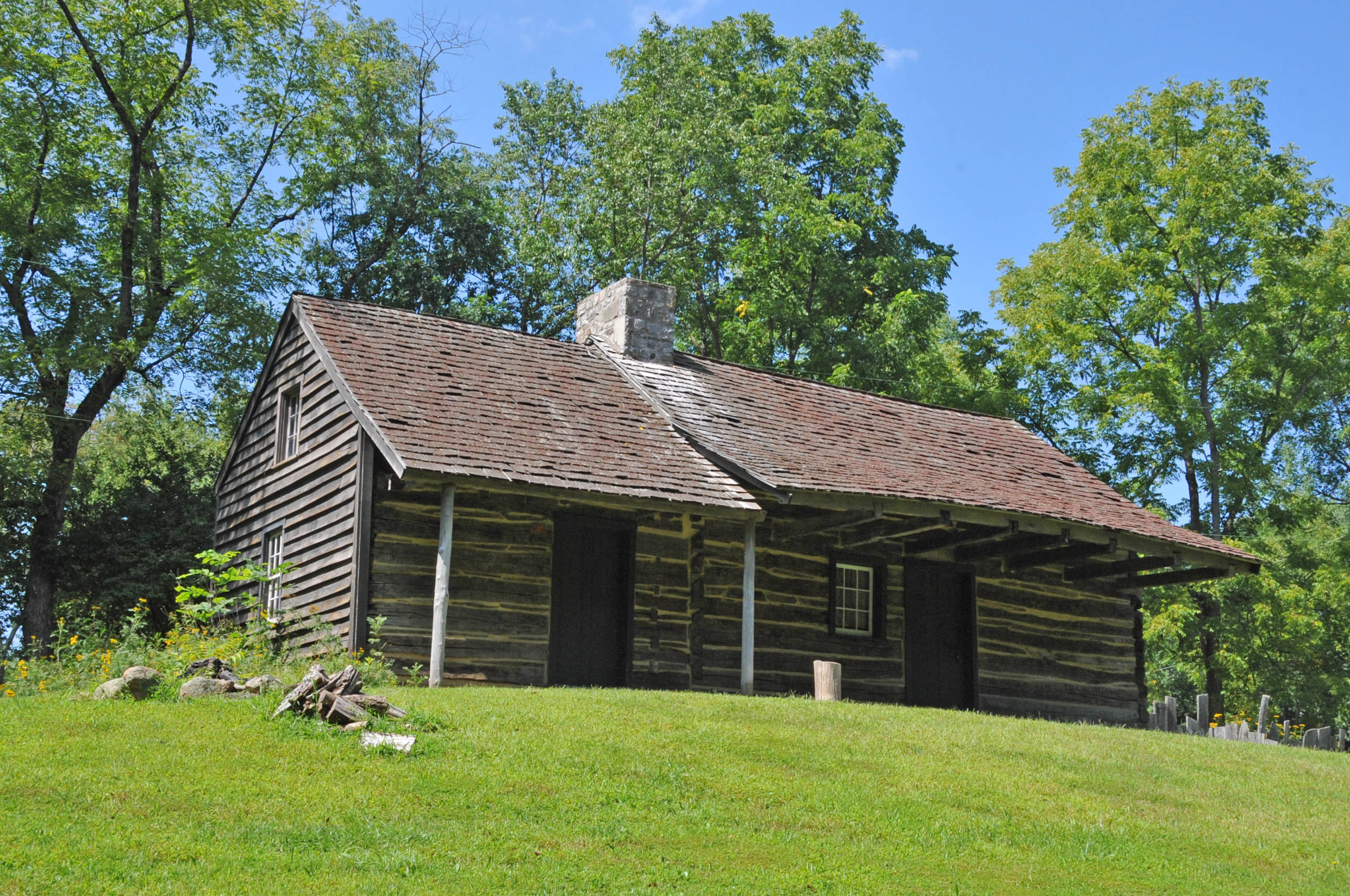
- Rutan Log Cabin, relocated at Waterloo Village

- Location within Sussex County, New Jersey Location within New Jersey Location within the United States
- Location: Mattison Avenue; Frankford Township, New Jersey
- Nearest city: Branchville, New Jersey
- Coordinates: 41°11′40″N 74°44′33″W
- Area: 99 acres (40 ha)
- Architectural style: Log Cabin
- NRHP reference No.: 77000910
- NJRHP No.: 4662; 2592

Significant dates
- Added to NRHP: August 24, 1977
- Designated NJRHP: November 23, 1976

The Rutan Farm is a historic 99-acre (40 ha) farm located on Mattison Avenue north of Branchville in Frankford Township of Sussex County, New Jersey. Listed as the Log Cabin and Farm, it was added to the National Register of Historic Places on August 24, 1977, for its significance in architecture. It includes two contributing buildings, the Rutan Log Cabin and a barn.

== History and description ==
The farm is located on the south slope of Kittatinny Mountain and borders Stokes State Forest. The listing estimates it predates the end of the 18th century. The Rutan Log Cabin consists of two sections, each constructed with hewn logs and notched with half-dovetail joints at the corners. The gable roofs are covered with wood shingles. In 1989, the cabin was relocated to Waterloo Village to save it from demolition. It is a contributing property of that historic district.

== See also ==
- National Register of Historic Places listings in Sussex County, New Jersey
