= Crescent Theatre (Sussex, New Jersey) =

- U.S. National Register of Historic Places
- New Jersey Register of Historic Places
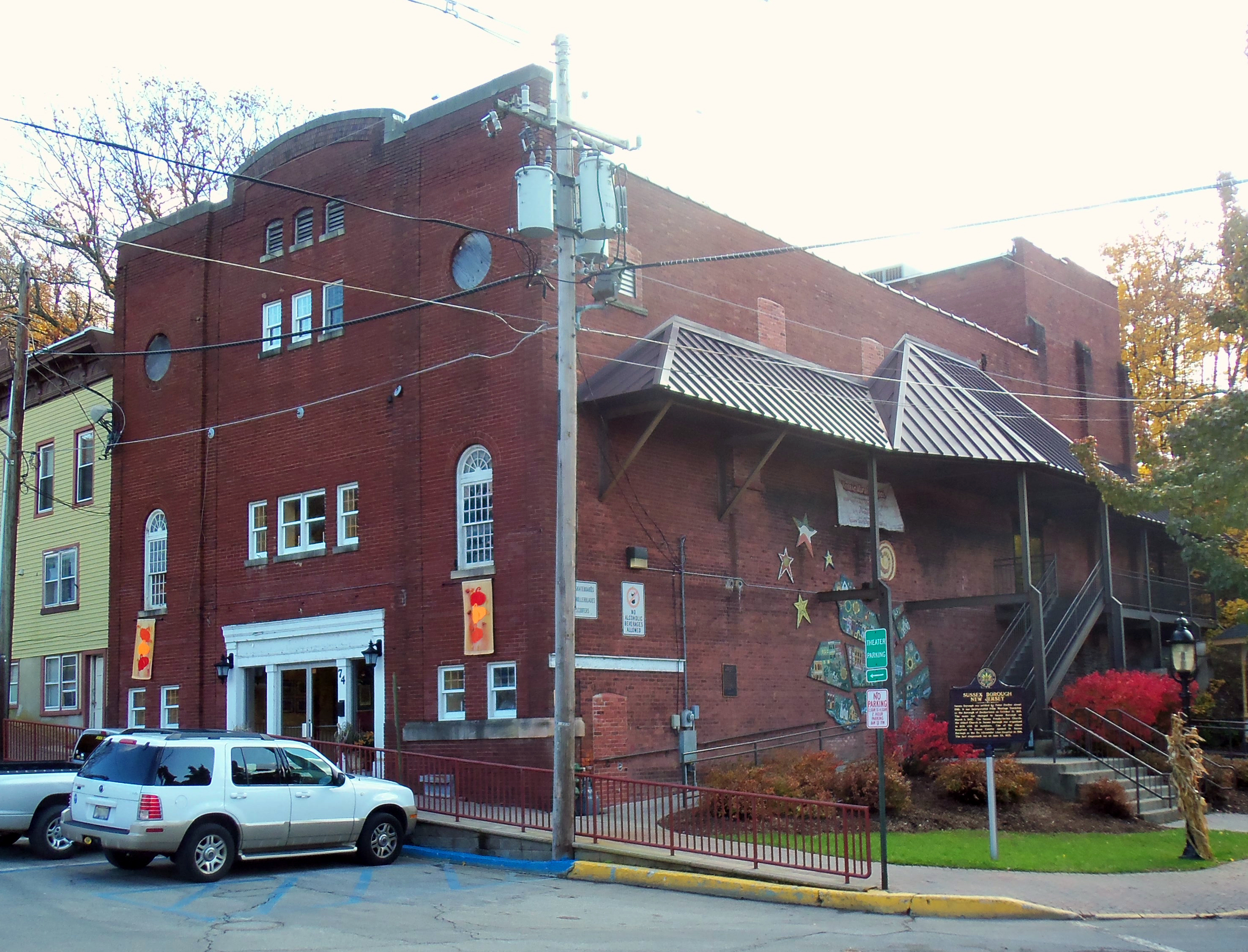
- The Crescent Theatre in 2011.

- Location within Sussex County, New Jersey Location within New Jersey Location within the United States
- Location: 74 Main Street, Sussex, New Jersey
- Coordinates: 41°12′33″N 74°36′28″W
- Built: 1917
- Architect: Flavio P. Grosso; Giles & Co.
- NRHP reference No.: 05000965
- NJRHP No.: 4101

Significant dates
- Added to NRHP: September 7, 2005
- Designated NJRHP: July 22, 2005

The Crescent Theatre is located at 74 Main Street in the borough of Sussex in Sussex County, New Jersey, United States. The theatre was built in 1917 and was added to the National Register of Historic Places on September 7, 2005, for its significance in entertainment. Since December 2022, the building has been owned and operated by Drama Geek Studios.

== History and description ==
The theatre opened in 1917 as a movie house and performance space. The red-brick building features limestone trim. It was designed by architect Flavio P. Grosso with Beaux-Arts architecture. In 1928 the name was changed to the Sussex Theatre. It closed in 1976 and was purchased by the borough in 1980, for use as the Sussex Community Center. It was repaired in 2001 and leased by the borough of Sussex to the Tri-State Actors Theater in 2002. The theater was added to the National Register of Historic Places on September 7, 2005, for its significance in entertainment. In 2011, theTri-State Actors Theater vacated the building and the borough leased the theater to the Cornerstone Playhouse, a locally run non-profit organization. During the COVID-19 lockdowns, the theater was forced to cease performances and, despite an attempt to raise funds via GoFundMe donations, the Cornerstone Playhouse closed its doors in 2021. In July 2022, it was reported that it was going to cost the borough between $50,000 and $100,000 to fix the theater's roof and that one of the building's outer walls had collapsed and could be seen through. Sussex Mayor suggested selling the theater to a non-profit organization. On August 16, 2022, the borough council instructed its attorney to include a deed restriction on the Crescent Theater property requiring a new owner to use the property strictly for theatrical productions, concerts, or other performances. On December 20, 2022, the borough accepted a bid to purchase the Crescent Theatre for $159,900, with the previously discussed stipulation, as well as a requirement to secure a Certificate of Occupancy within 120 days of closing and completion of necessary code upgrades. The winning bid came from Joshua Reed, managing director of Drama Geek Studios of Newton, New Jersey. Since the purchase, Drama Geek Studios have held numerous performances, including Evil Dead The Musical, Newsies, Hairspray, Repo! The Genetic Opera, The SpongeBob Musical, and Rock of Ages.

== See also ==
- National Register of Historic Places listings in Sussex County, New Jersey
