= Foster–Armstrong House =

Historic house in New Jersey, United States

- U.S. National Register of Historic Places
- New Jersey Register of Historic Places
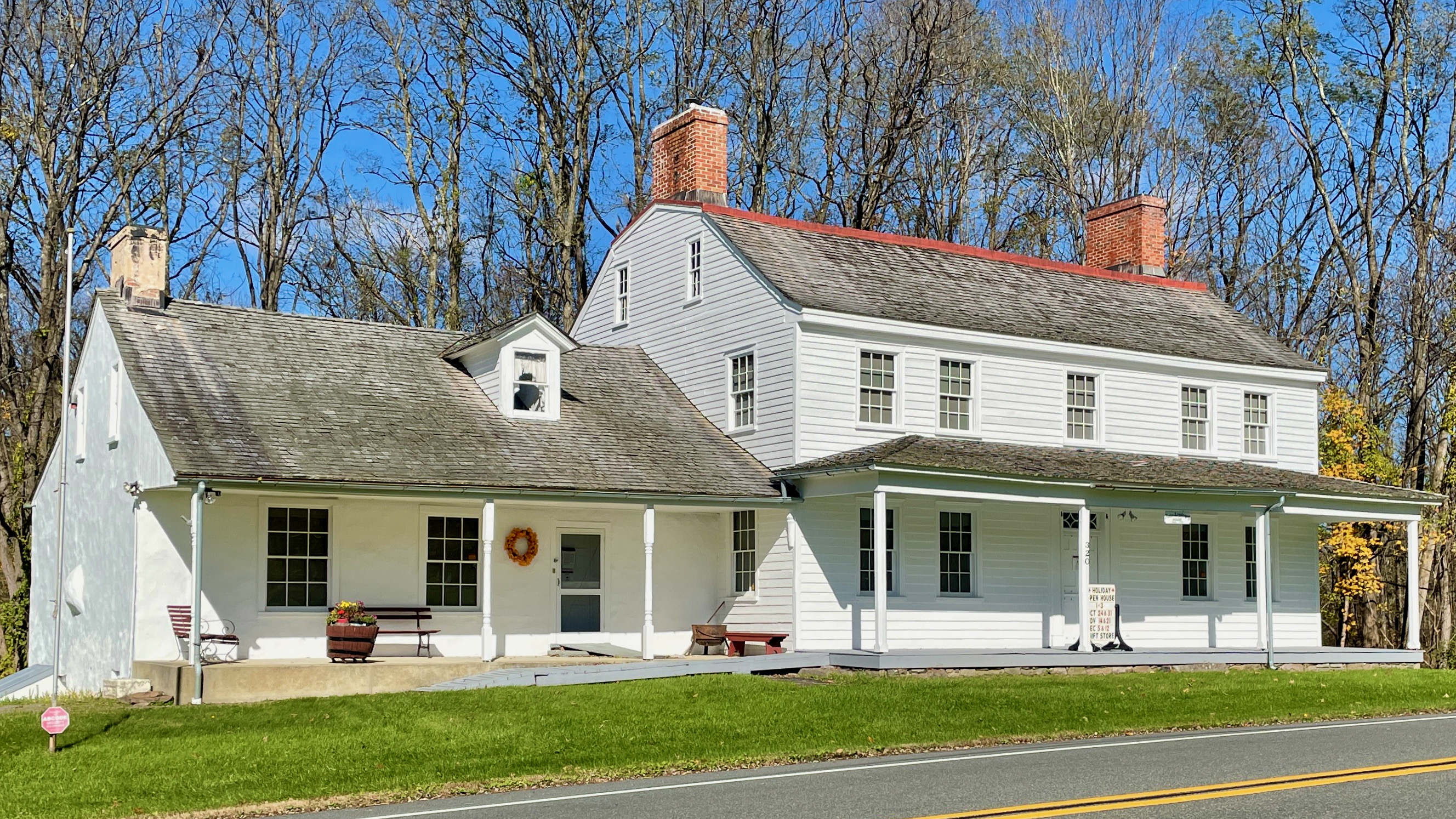
- Foster–Armstrong House in 2021

- Location within Sussex County, New Jersey Location within New Jersey Location within the United States
- Location: 320 River Road, Montague Township, New Jersey
- Coordinates: 41°18′33″N 74°47′19″W
- Area: 2.4 acres (0.97 ha)
- NRHP reference No.: 79000235
- NJRHP No.: 2605

Significant dates
- Added to NRHP: July 23, 1979
- Designated NJRHP: March 29, 1979

The Foster–Armstrong House is a historic house museum located at 320 River Road (County Route 521) in Montague Township of Sussex County, New Jersey. It was documented by the Historic American Buildings Survey in 1970. The farmhouse was added to the National Register of Historic Places on July 23, 1979, for its significance in agriculture, architecture, commerce, and exploration/settlement. The house is now part of the Delaware Water Gap National Recreation Area. The museum is managed by the Montague Association for the Restoration of Community History.

== History ==
The house was built c. 1790s by Julius Foster. In 1812, James B. Armstrong married Foster's daughter. Foster and Armstrong operated a ferry across the nearby Delaware River.

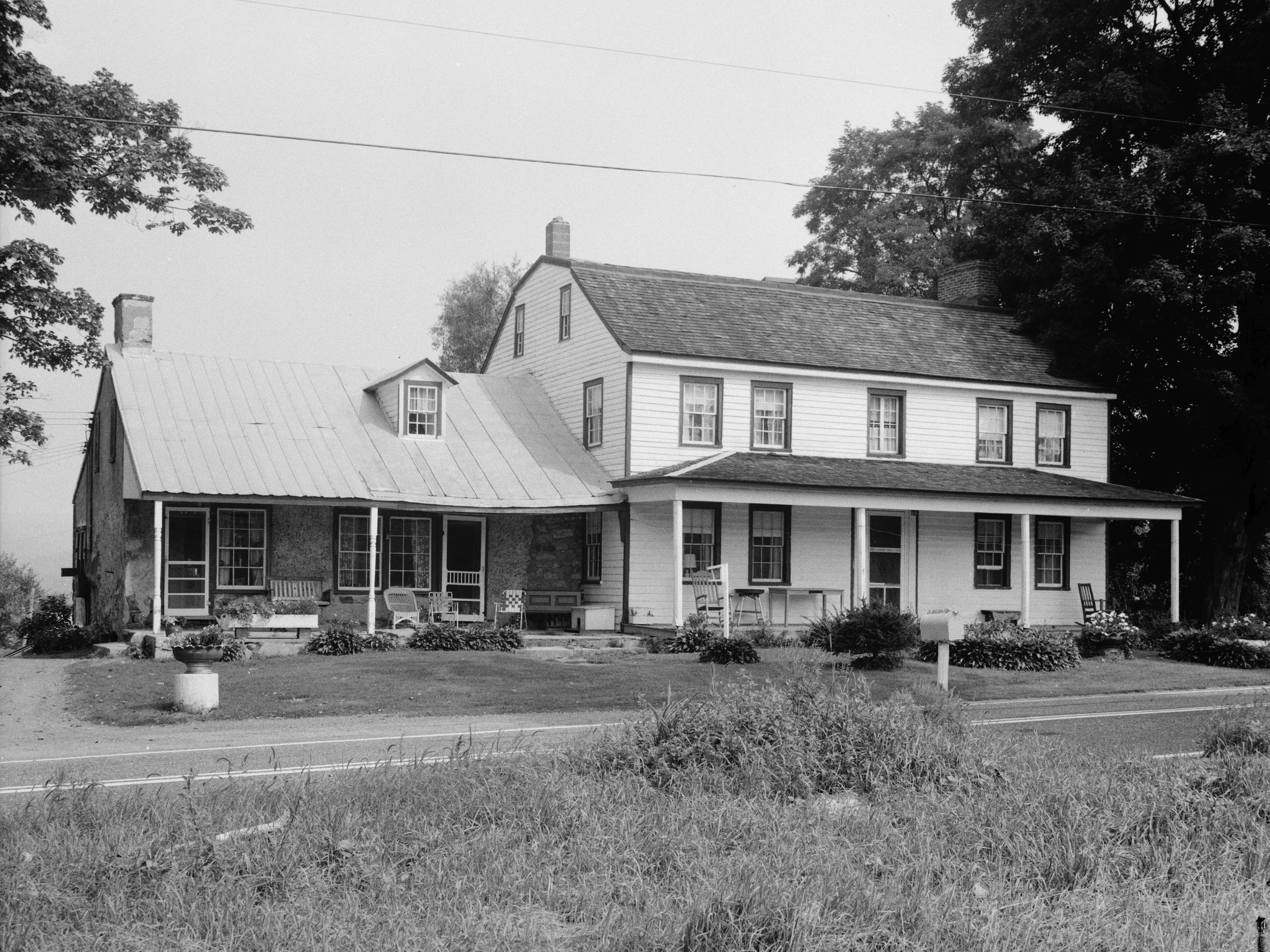
HABS photo from 1970

== See also ==
- National Register of Historic Places listings in Sussex County, New Jersey
- List of museums in New Jersey
