= Meadowburn Farm =

- U.S. National Register of Historic Places
- New Jersey Register of Historic Places
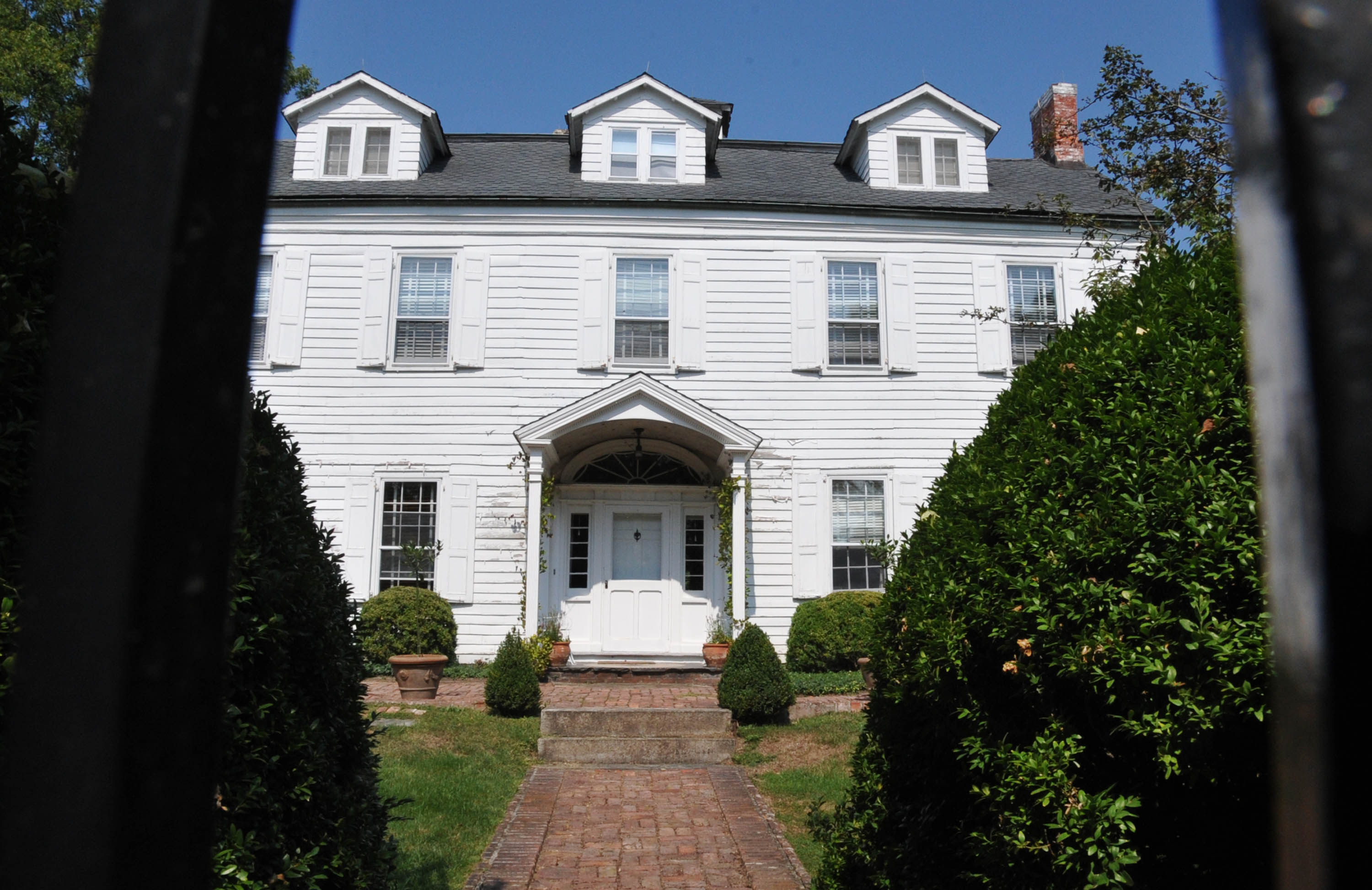

- Location within Sussex County, New Jersey Location within New Jersey Location within the United States
- Location: Meadowburn Road, Vernon Township, New Jersey
- Area: 5 acres (2.0 ha)
- Architect: Helena Rutherfurd Ely
- Architectural style: Colonial Revival, Federal
- NRHP reference No.: 93000748
- NJRHP No.: 2637

Significant dates
- Added to NRHP: August 9, 1993
- Designated NJRHP: June 28, 1993

The Meadowburn Farm is a historic 5-acre (2.0 ha) farmstead located on Meadowburn Road in Vernon Township in Sussex County, New Jersey, United States. It was added to the National Register of Historic Places on August 9, 1993, for its significance in landscape architecture and literature. The flower gardens were first created by the author and gardener Helena Rutherfurd Ely.

== History and description ==
The farm dates to the 1750s when William Willet DeKay, son of Thomas DeKay, built a small house here, now part of the farmhouse. The DeKay family owned the property until 1853, when it was sold to Mary and Louisa Rutherfurd, daughters of U.S. Senator John Rutherfurd. They named the farm Meadowburn. After their deaths, their nephew John Rutherford, inherited the property. In 1881, the farmstead was given to his daughter Helena Rutherfurd Ely as a wedding present.

== See also ==
- National Register of Historic Places listings in Sussex County, New Jersey
