= Erickson Lakeside Cabin =

- U.S. National Register of Historic Places
- New Jersey Register of Historic Places
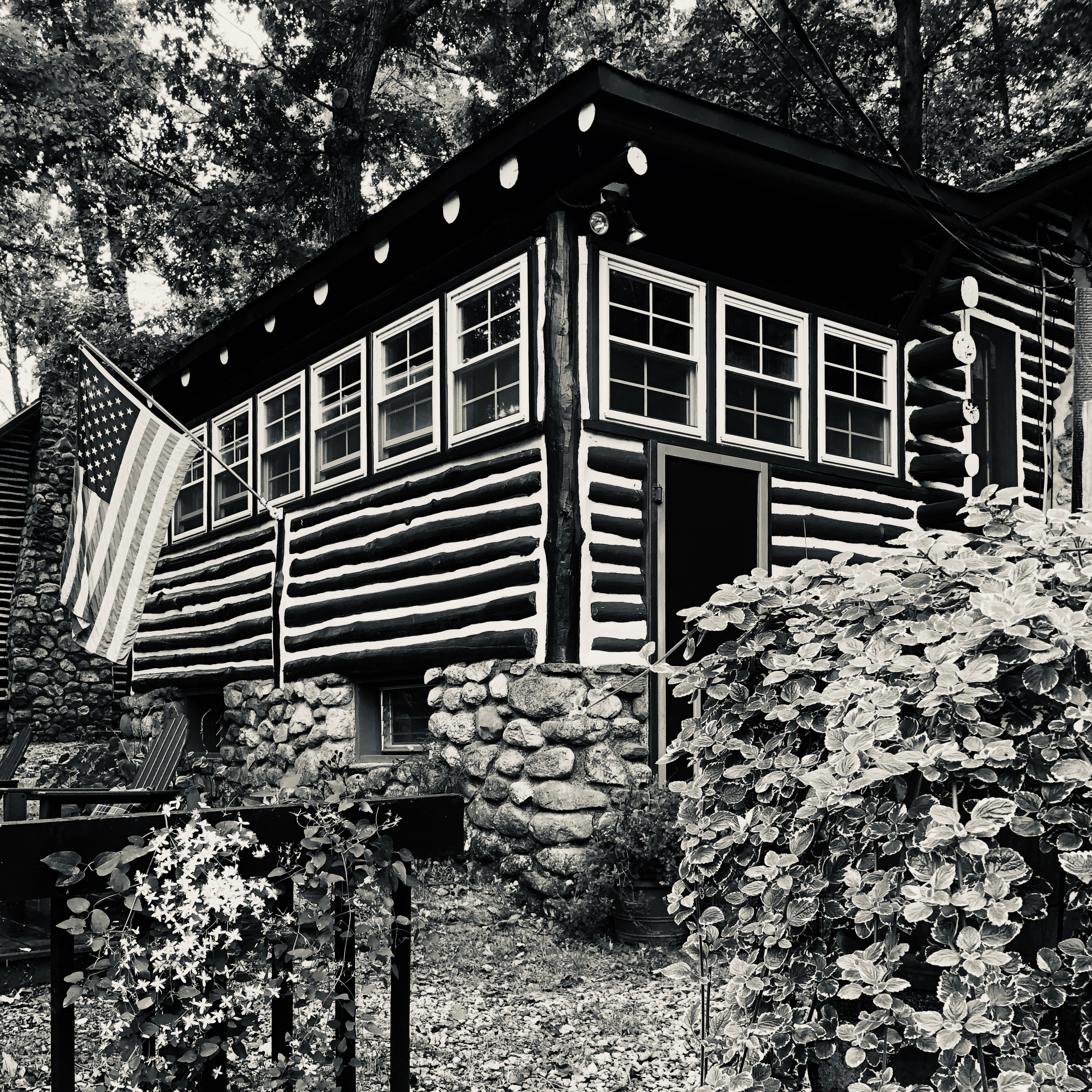

- Location within Sussex County, New Jersey Location within New Jersey Location within the United States
- Location: 103 Lakeside Drive, Lake Wallkill, Vernon Township, New Jersey
- Coordinates: 41°14′11.5″N 74°32′15.0″W
- Built: 1934
- Built by: John R. Seckler & S. Clayton Shepperd
- Architect: Herb Smith
- Architectural style: Late 19th- and early 20th-century American movements
- NRHP reference No.: 100001778
- NJRHP No.: 5591

Significant dates
- Added to NRHP: November 3, 2017
- Designated NJRHP: September 4, 2017

The Erickson Lakeside Cabin is a log cabin located at 103 Lakeside Drive by Lake Wallkill in Vernon Township in Sussex County, New Jersey, United States. Built in 1934, it was added to the National Register of Historic Places on November 3, 2017, for its significance in architecture, featuring late 19th- and early 20th-century American movements architecture.

== History and description ==
The one story log cabin was designed by architect Herb Smith featuring the architectural style of real estate developers John R. Seckler and S. Clayton Shepperd. It was constructed using American chestnut wood. The logs were taken from standing dead trees by Lake Wallkill, a result of the chestnut blight of the early 1920s. The original owners, Harold and Sophie Erickson, purchased the cabin in 1935.

== See also ==
- National Register of Historic Places listings in Sussex County, New Jersey
- Evans–Waters Cottage – Another Lake Wallkill log cabin
