= Shoemaker–Houck Farm =

- U.S. National Register of Historic Places
- New Jersey Register of Historic Places
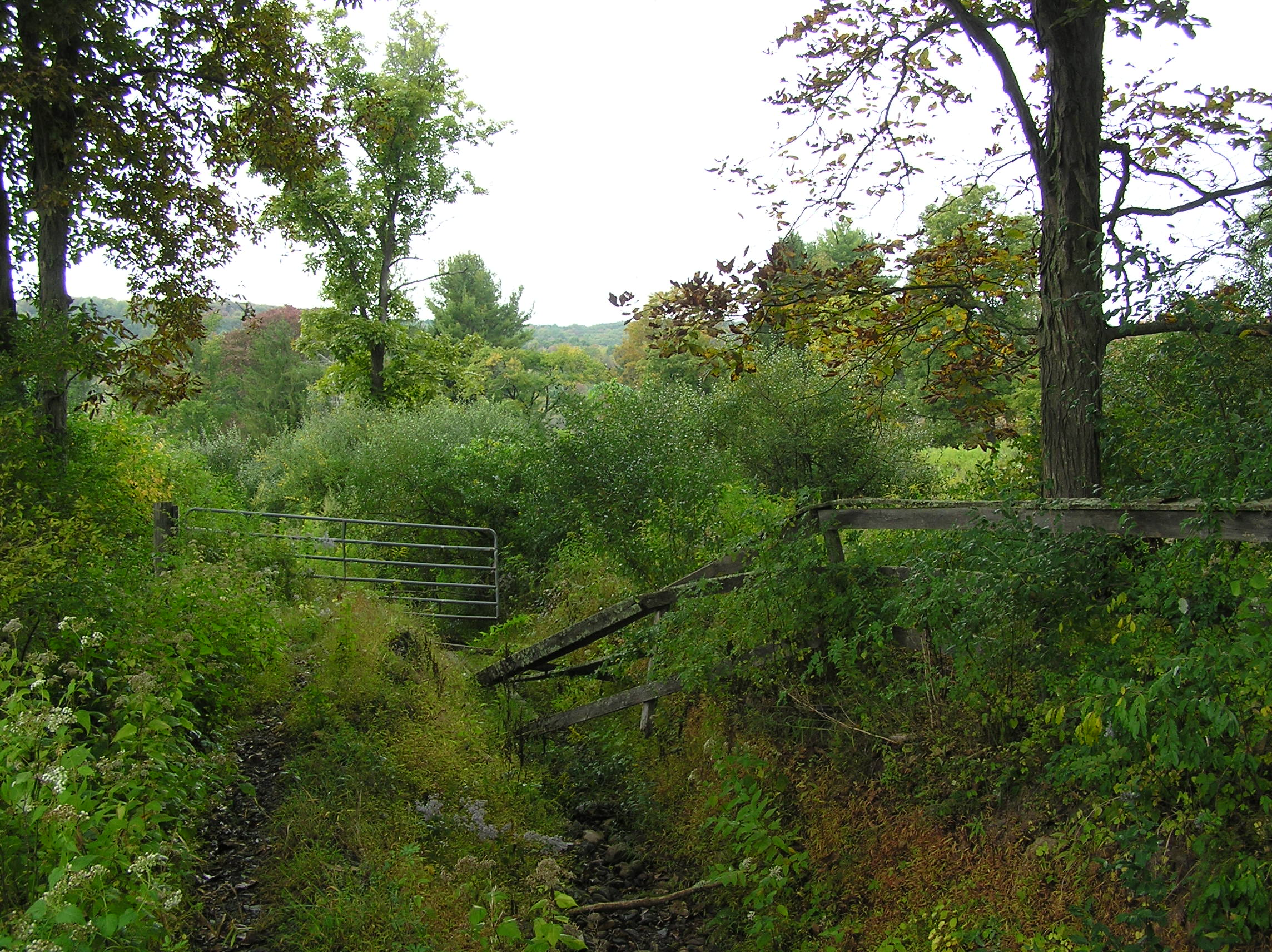
- Entrance to farm

- Location within Sussex County, New Jersey Location within New Jersey Location within the United States
- Location: Haney's Mill-Wallpack Center Road, south of Wallpack Center, New Jersey
- Coordinates: 41°08′35″N 74°52′55″W
- Area: 3.2 acres (1.3 ha)
- Built: 1815
- Built by: Daniel Shoemaker
- NRHP reference No.: 79000234
- NJRHP No.: 2642

Significant dates
- Added to NRHP: July 23, 1979
- Designated NJRHP: March 6, 1978

The Shoemaker–Houck Farm is a historic 3.2-acre (1.3 ha) farmstead located on Haney's Mill-Wallpack Center Road south of the Wallpack Center section of Walpack Township in Sussex County, New Jersey, United States. It was added to the National Register of Historic Places on July 23, 1979, for its significance in architecture and includes a farmhouse and barn. The farmstead is now part of the Delaware Water Gap National Recreation Area.

== History and description ==
The property was once part of a large tract owned by John Cleves Symmes, a soldier and politician during the American Revolutionary War. Daniel Shoemaker purchased the property from Symmes daughter Mary and husband Peyton Short. The oldest part of the house is a one and one-half story stone wing built c. 1815. The two-story main part was built of coursed stone c. 1822. It was renovated during the 1940s and 1950s. The listing also includes the farm properties: gabled barn, tiled silo, workshop, ice house, and milk house.

== See also ==
- National Register of Historic Places listings in Sussex County, New Jersey
