= Evans–Waters Cottage =

- U.S. National Register of Historic Places
- New Jersey Register of Historic Places
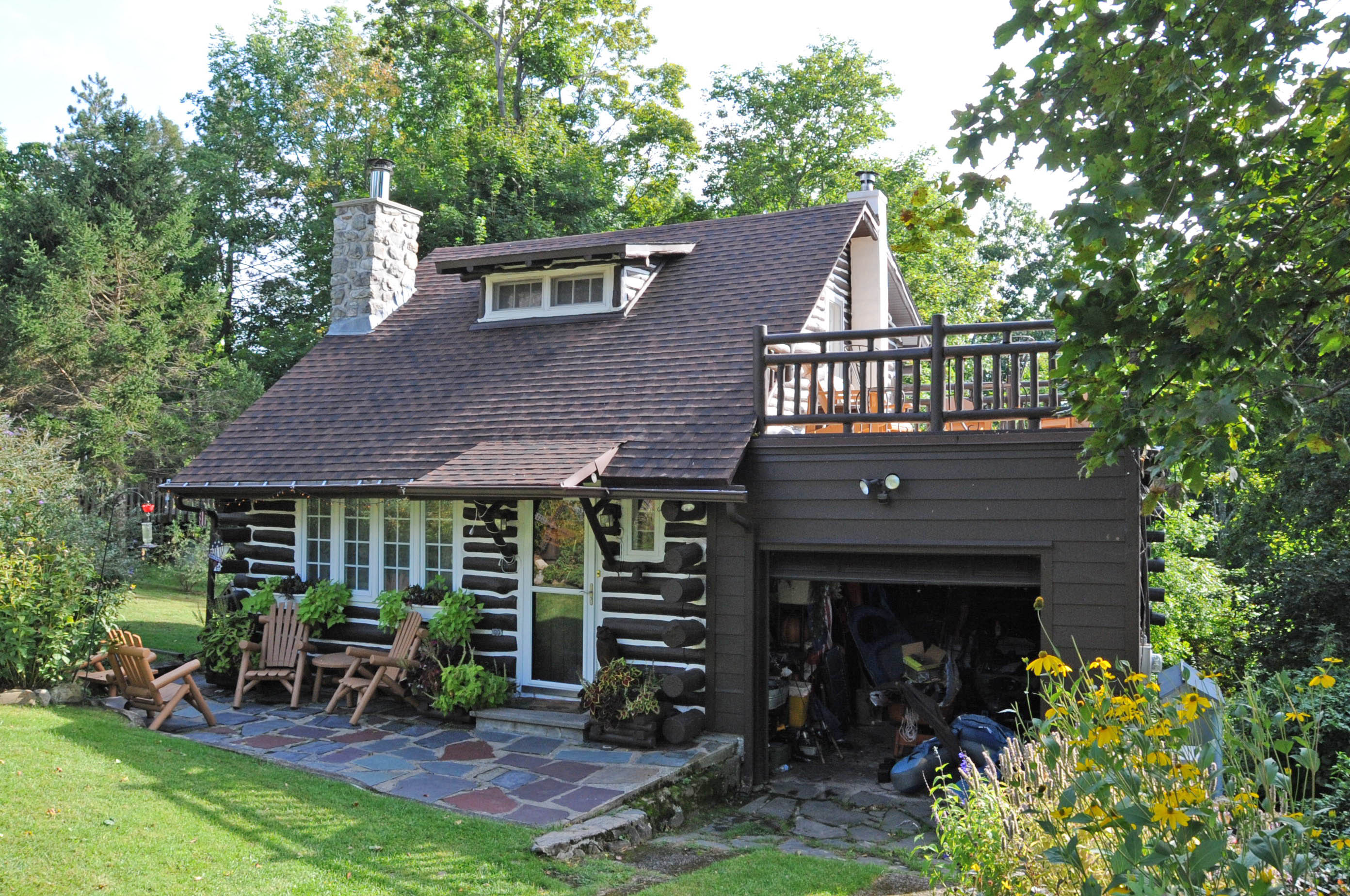

- Location within Sussex County, New Jersey Location within New Jersey Location within the United States
- Location: 11 Grandview Road, Lake Wallkill, Vernon Township, New Jersey
- Coordinates: 41°14′23.1″N 74°32′15.9″W
- Built: 1934
- Architect: Herb Smith
- Architectural style: Late 19th and Early 20th Century American Movements
- NRHP reference No.: 16000777
- NJRHP No.: 5275

Significant dates
- Added to NRHP: November 15, 2016
- Designated NJRHP: September 20, 2016

The Evans–Waters Cottage, also known as Ferrone's Sunset Cottage, is a log cabin located at 11 Grandview Road by Lake Wallkill in Vernon Township in Sussex County, New Jersey, United States. Built in 1934, it was added to the National Register of Historic Places on November 15, 2016, for its significance in architecture, featuring Late 19th and Early 20th Century American Movements architecture.

== History and description ==
The one and one-story cabin was designed by architect Herb Smith and built using American chestnut wood. The lumber was taken from standing dead trees by Lake Wallkill, a result of the chestnut blight of the early 1920s. It features the architectural style of real estate developers John R. Seckler and S. Clayton Shepperd. The 1934 cottage was originally owned by Sarah G. Evans. In 1949, it was owned by Lawrence J. Waters and Alberta Waters.

== See also ==
- National Register of Historic Places listings in Sussex County, New Jersey
- Erickson Lakeside Cabin – Another Lake Wallkill log cabin
