= Bethany Chapel =

Historic church in New Jersey, United States

- U.S. National Register of Historic Places
- New Jersey Register of Historic Places
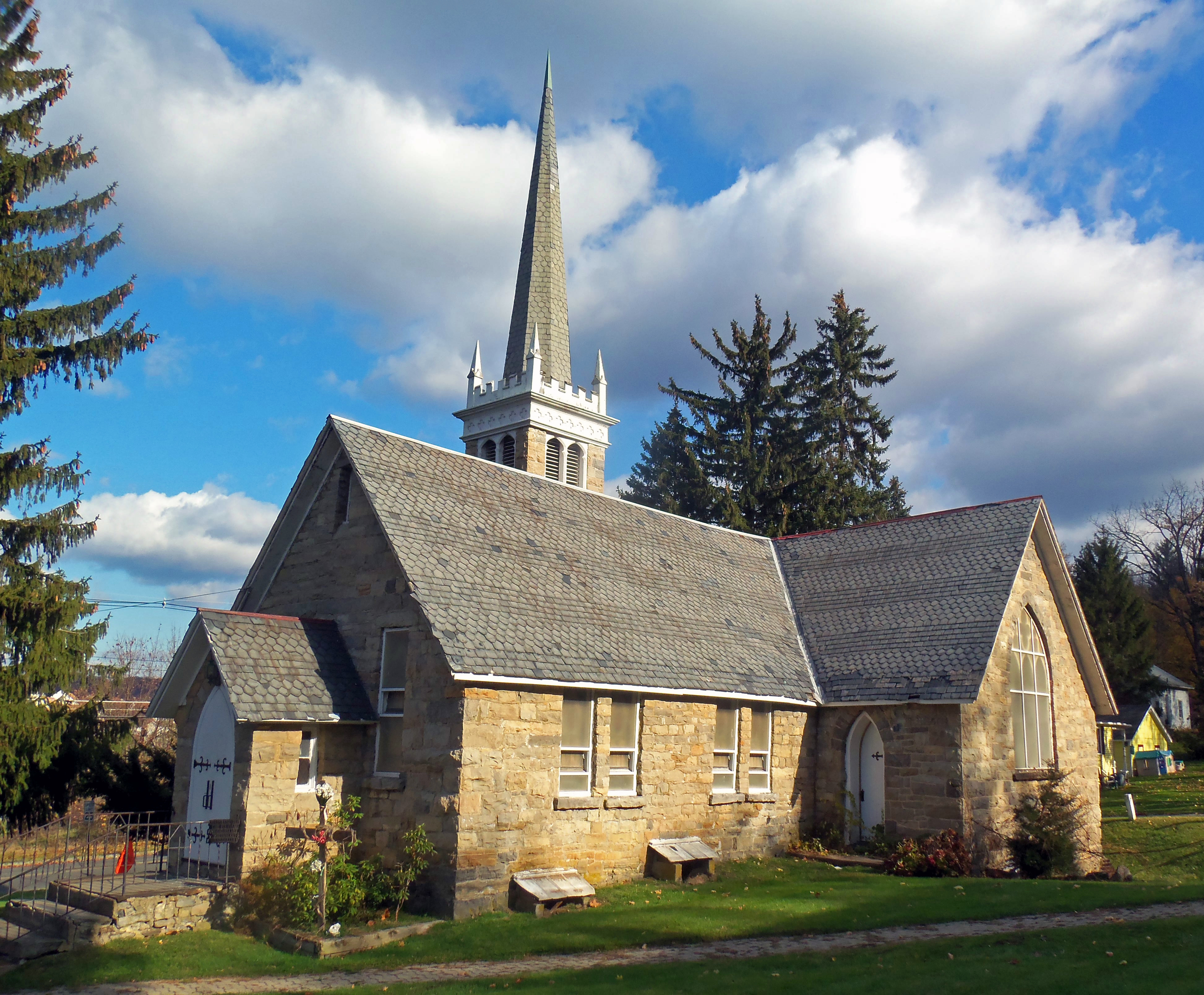
- North elevation and east profile, 2011

- Location within Sussex County, New Jersey Location within New Jersey Location within the United States
- Location: 103 Hamburg Turnpike, Hamburg, New Jersey
- Coordinates: 41°8′50″N 74°34′26″W
- Area: 1 acre (0.40 ha)
- Built: 1869
- Architectural style: Gothic Revival
- NRHP reference No.: 80002517
- NJRHP No.: 2597
- Added to NRHP: February 29, 1980

Bethany Chapel, also known as the Hamburg Presbyterian Church, is a historic building located at 103 Hamburg Turnpike in the borough of Hamburg, in Sussex County, New Jersey, United States. Built in 1869, it was added to the National Register of Historic Places on February 29, 1980, for its significance in architecture and religion.

== History and description ==
The church was constructed using random coursed stone in 1869. Two transepts were added in 1879. The bell tower and steeple were added in 1884. All sections feature rural Gothic Revival architecture.

== See also ==
- National Register of Historic Places listings in Sussex County, New Jersey
