= Hinchman–Rickey Farm =

- U.S. National Register of Historic Places
- U.S. Historic district
- New Jersey Register of Historic Places
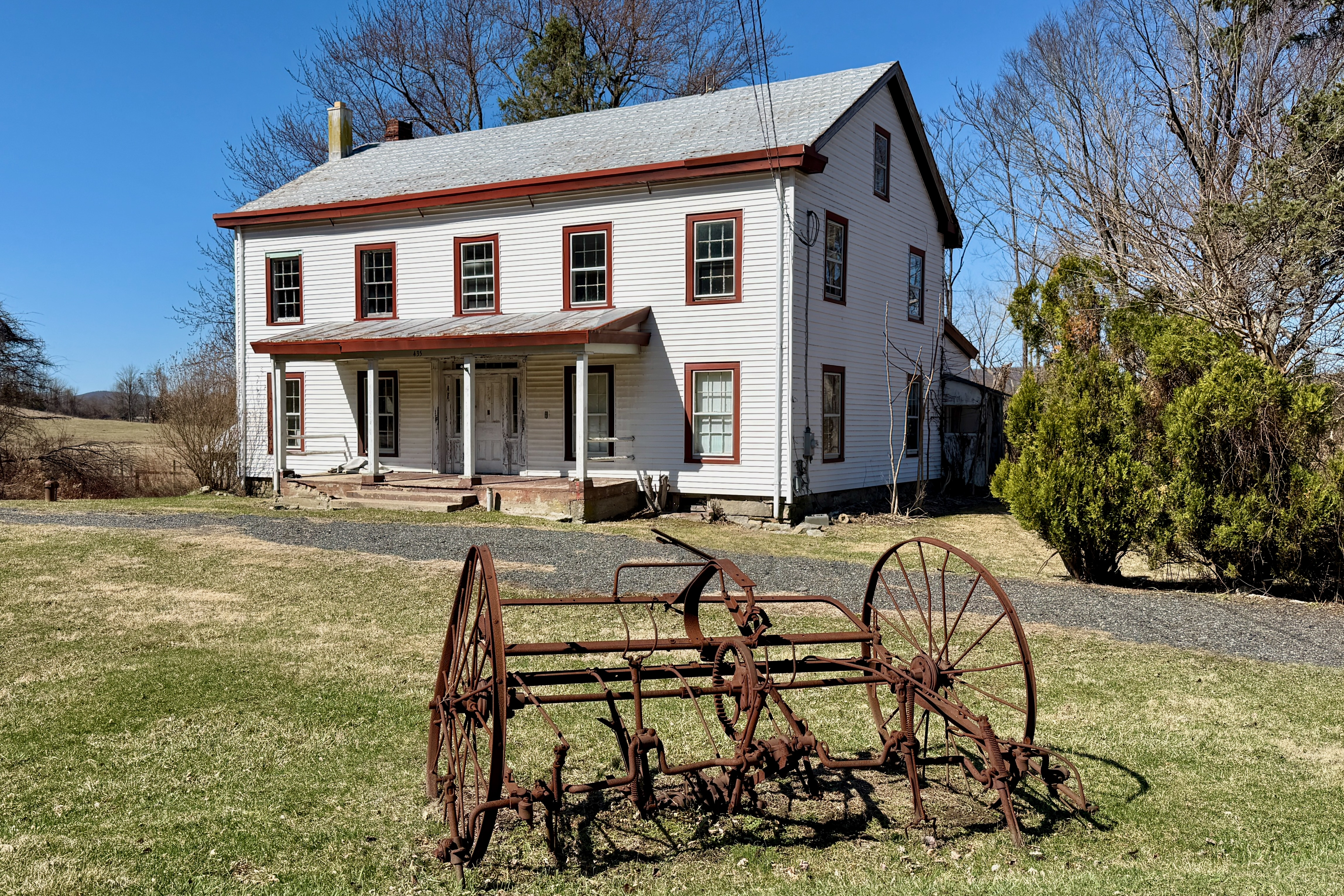
- Hinchman–Rickey Farmhouse in 2025

- Location within Sussex County, New Jersey Location within New Jersey Location within the United States
- Location: 435 and 442 Route 94, Vernon Township, New Jersey
- Coordinates: 41°12′57″N 74°27′23″W
- Area: 73 acres (30 ha)
- Architectural style: Greek Revival
- NRHP reference No.: 100011488
- NJRHP No.: 5745

Significant dates
- Added to NRHP: March 7, 2025
- Designated NJRHP: January 14, 2025

The Hinchman–Rickey Farm, also known as the Lowland Farm, is a historic 73-acre (30 ha) farm located at 435 and 442 Route 94 in Vernon Township in Sussex County, New Jersey, United States. It was added to the National Register of Historic Places on March 7, 2025, for its significance in agriculture and architecture. The district includes seven contributing buildings.

== History and description ==
The farmhouse was built around 1885 and features Greek Revival architecture. The Wisconsin-style dairy barn was built around 1937. The former carriage house now serves the Valley Farmers Cooperative.

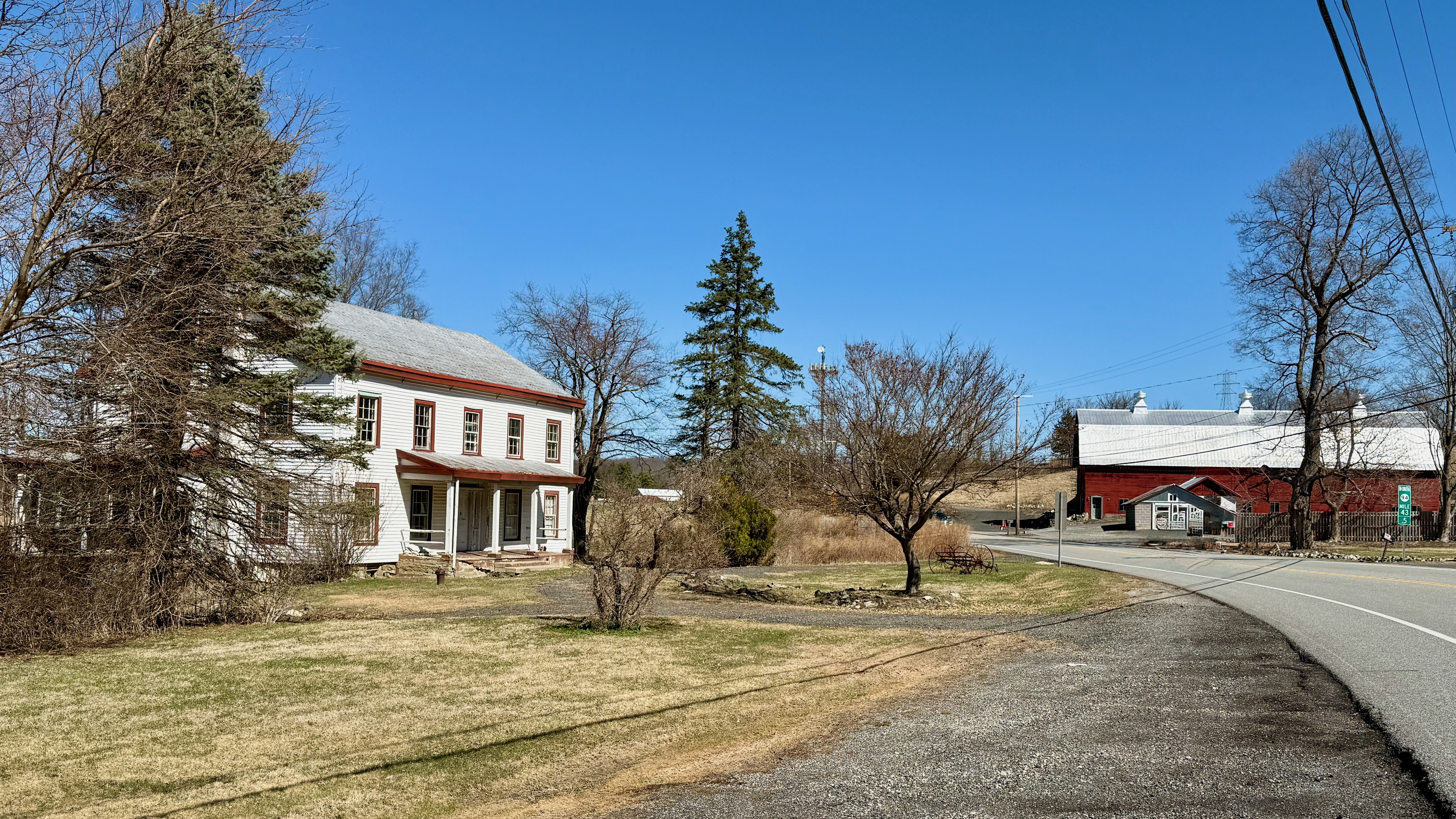
Area view of the farm

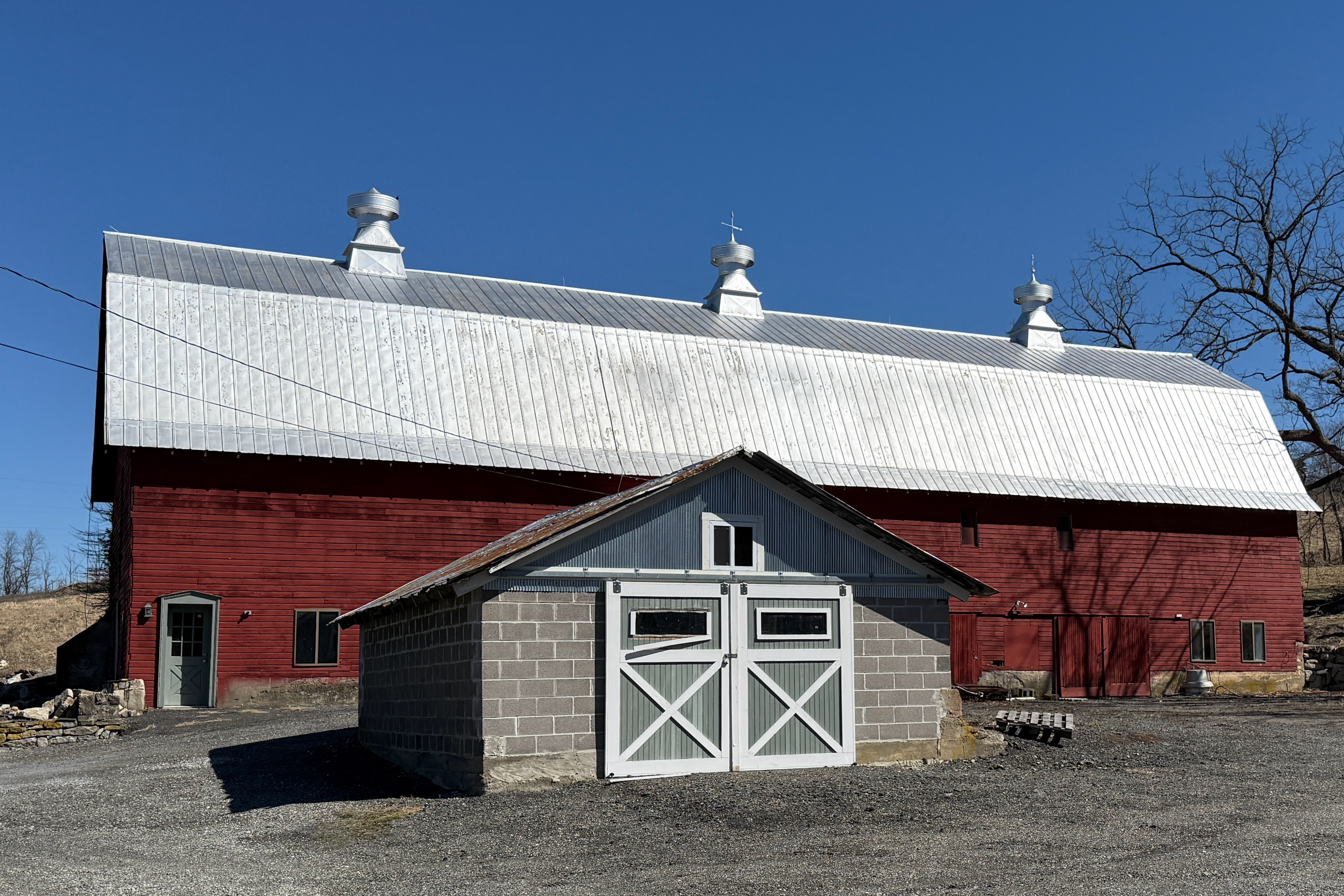
Dairy barn and machine shed

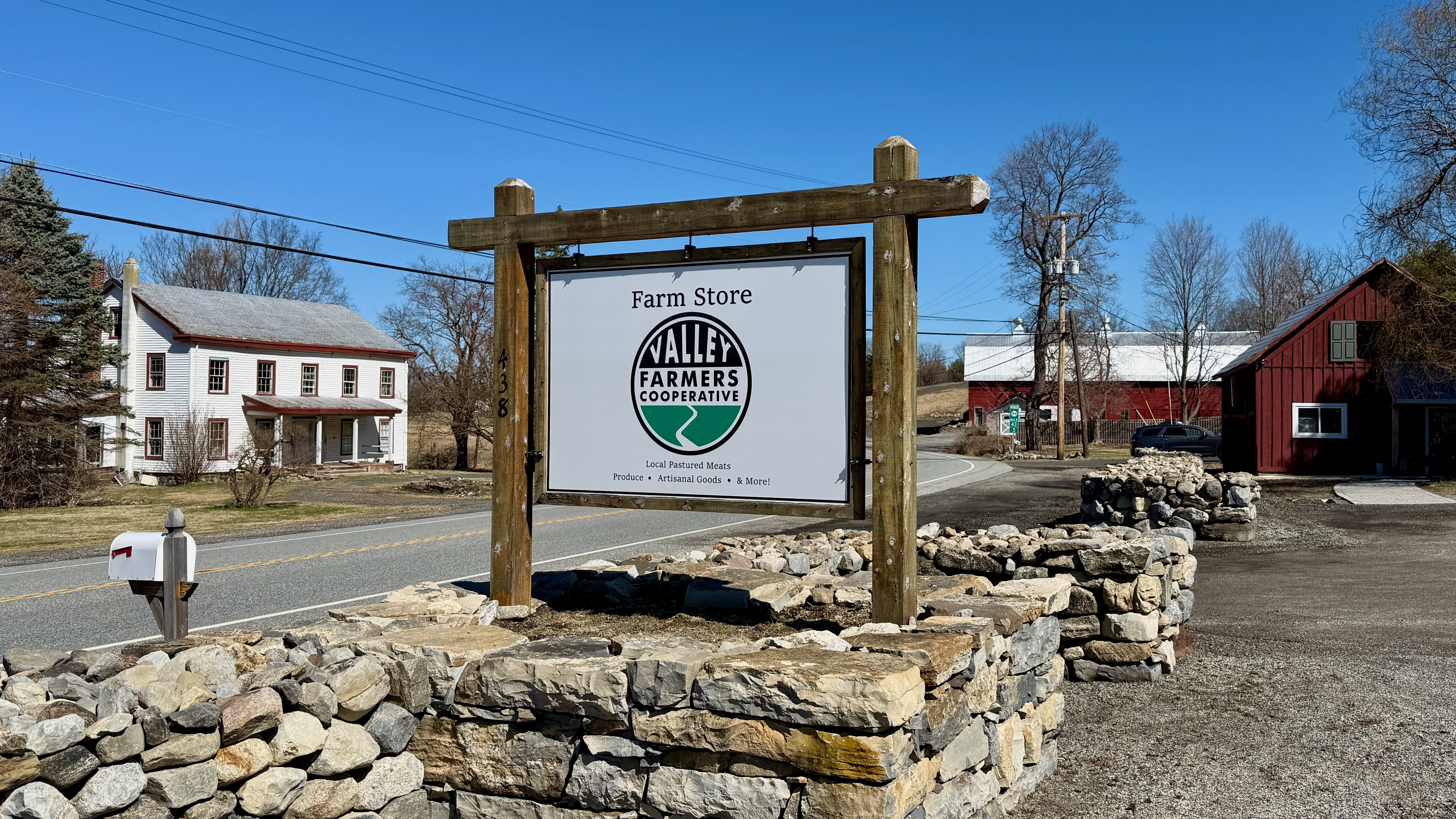
Carriage house on the right

== See also ==
- National Register of Historic Places listings in Sussex County, New Jersey
