= First Presbyterian Church of Wantage =

Historic church in New Jersey, United States

- U.S. National Register of Historic Places
- New Jersey Register of Historic Places
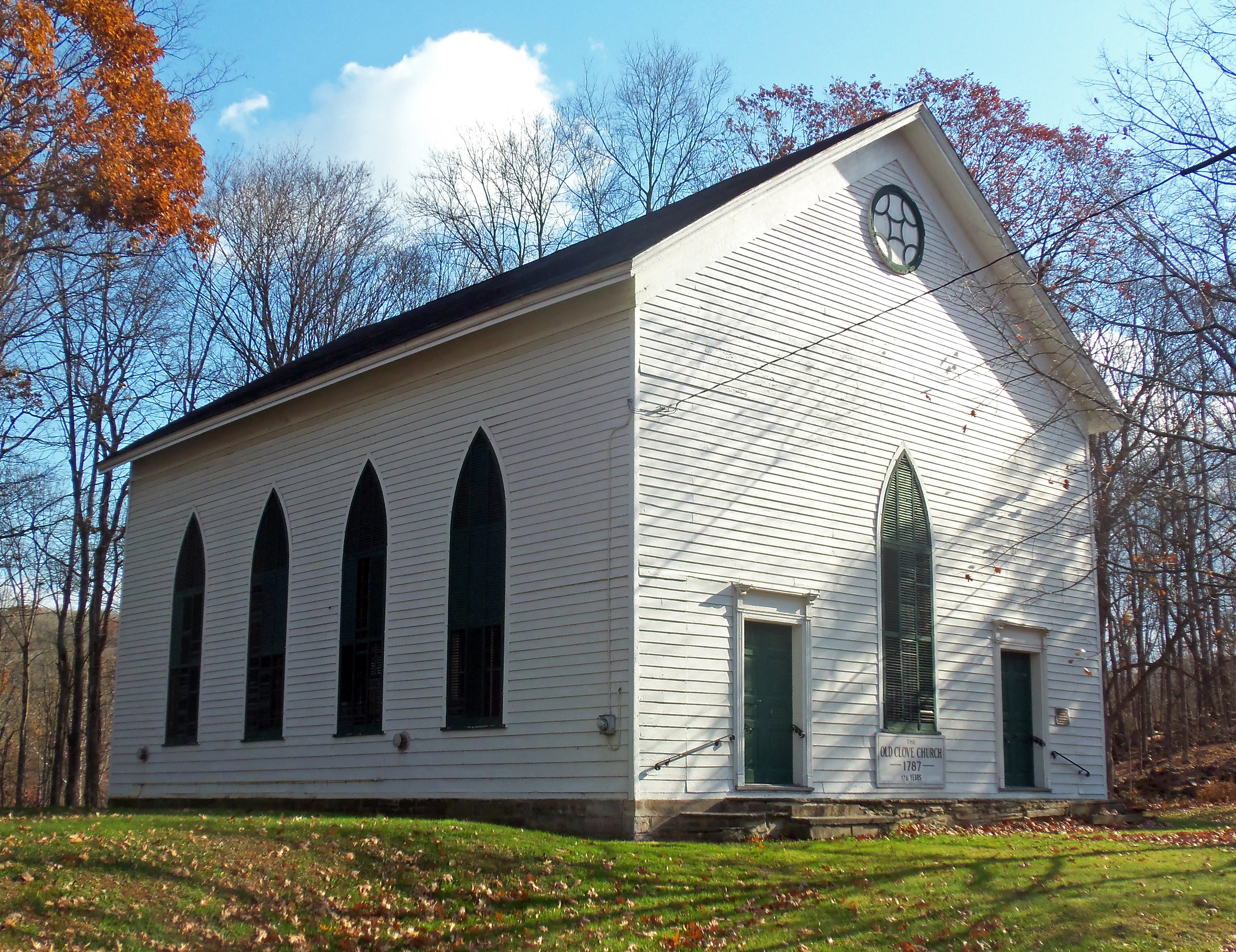
- West and south elevations, 2011

- Location within Sussex County, New Jersey Location within New Jersey Location within the United States
- Nearest city: Sussex, New Jersey
- Coordinates: 41°14′28″N 74°37′22″W
- Area: less than one acre
- Built: 1829
- Architect: Andrew McNish
- NRHP reference No.: 82003305
- NJRHP No.: 2646

Significant dates
- Added to NRHP: September 23, 1982
- Designated NJRHP: July 29, 1982

First Presbyterian Church of Wantage (Old Clove Church) is a historic church in Wantage Township, Sussex County, New Jersey, United States. Church records point to a Dutch Reformed congregation founded in 1788, which merged with First Presbyterian Church of Wantage, founded in 1818. The building is situated on a hill, due south of Clove Brook, a creek from which it derives its common name. It was built in 1829 and added to the National Register of Historic Places on September 23, 1982 for its significance in architecture and religion. The structure is no longer used as a church, but the Friends of Old Clove Church continue an inter-denominational service once annually.

== Architecture ==
The church is Greek Revival with Gothic detailing. The Gothic windows were included as ornament to distinguish the structure as a place of worship. Schools and barns in the area had a similar style and structure. This is the third church building to inhabit the property. The National Register of Historic Places describes the church as a "simple 1 1/2 story rectangular clapboarded frame structure with a four bayside facade and a three bay gable front on a cut stone foundation." The structure remains virtually unchanged since the 19th century. Features include: original floor design, original pews and a balcony that spans three sides of the interior. Two double-leaf entrance doorways on the south side of the structure point to separate entrances for males and females. Pot-bellied stoves and a Victorian chandelier were additions during the churches centennial.

== Cemetery ==
Old Clove Church Cemetery is across New Jersey State Route 23 from the church. Interred here are the remains of several American Revolution and Civil War veterans.

== See also ==
- National Register of Historic Places listings in Sussex County, New Jersey
