= High Breeze Farm =

Historic house in New Jersey, United States

- U.S. National Register of Historic Places
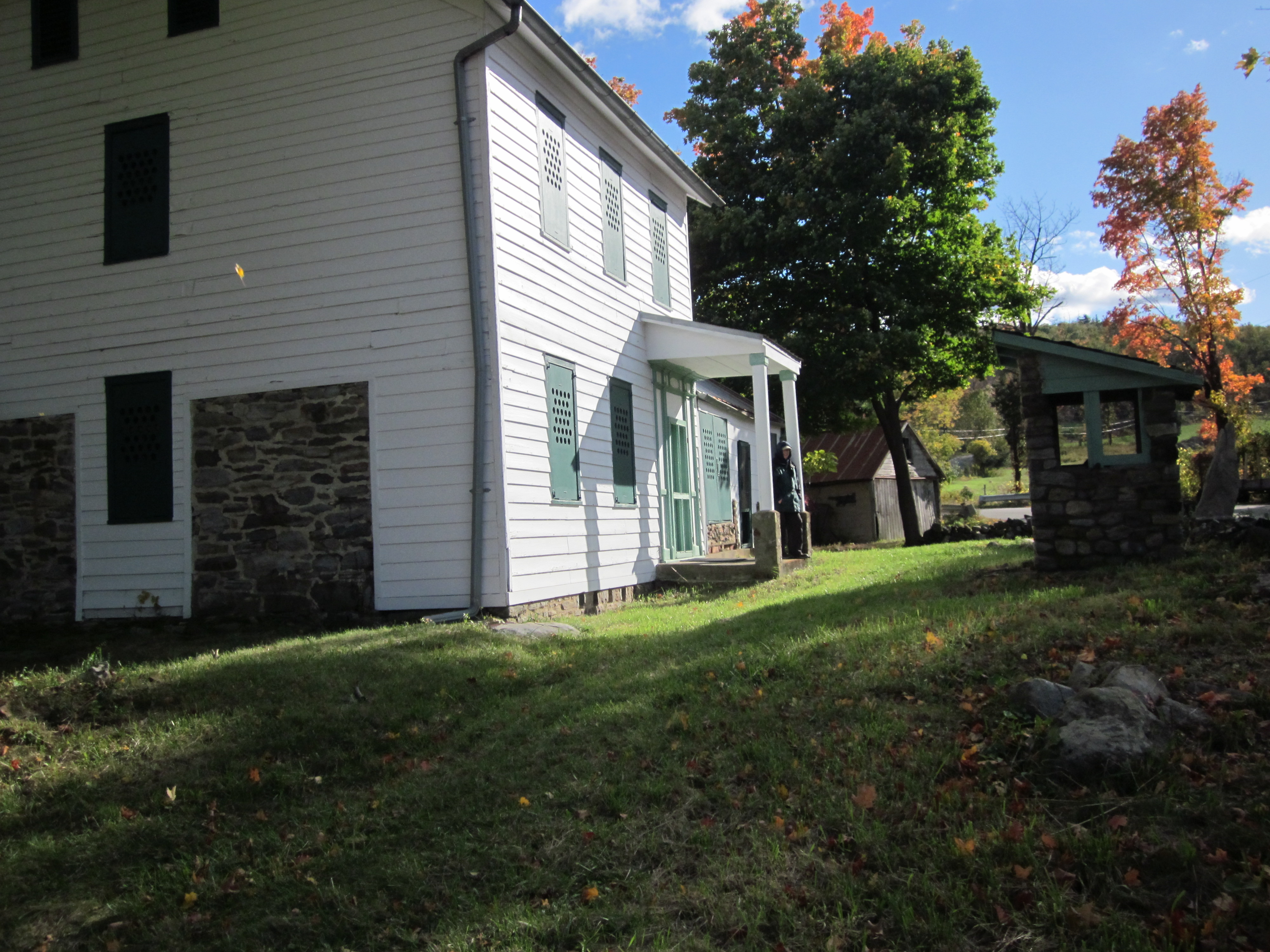
- Main House

- Location within Sussex County, New Jersey Location within New Jersey Location within the United States
- Nearest city: Highland Lakes, New Jersey
- Coordinates: 41°13′6″N 74°25′3″W
- Area: 162 acres (66 ha)
- Architectural style: Late 19th And 20th Century Revivals, Federal, English barn
- NRHP reference No.: 89000993
- Added to NRHP: July 27, 1989

High Breeze Farm, also known as Barrett Farm, is located in the Highland Lakes section of Vernon Township, in Sussex County, New Jersey, United States.

== History ==
The 160-acre (65 ha) farm, now known as High Breeze Farm, was owned by the Demarest family from approximately 1818 to 1860, when it was purchased by the Barrett family. The main farmhouse was built in 1828 and the barns and outbuildings were built between 1860 and 1935. The Barretts operated it continuously from 1860 to 1986 with very few changes to the original farming methods. The farm was used mainly for subsistence farming. Four generations of Barretts operated it. They raised horses, cows, and chickens and produced hay, corn, turnips, rutabagas, apples, peaches, pears, plums, honey, and maple syrup. Luther J. Barrett was the last family member to work the farm, operating it “almost as a time capsule of 19th century farming,” using a draft horse for most farm work. At the time of Luther J. Barrett's death in 1986, the farm had not installed plumbing, central heating, or telephones.

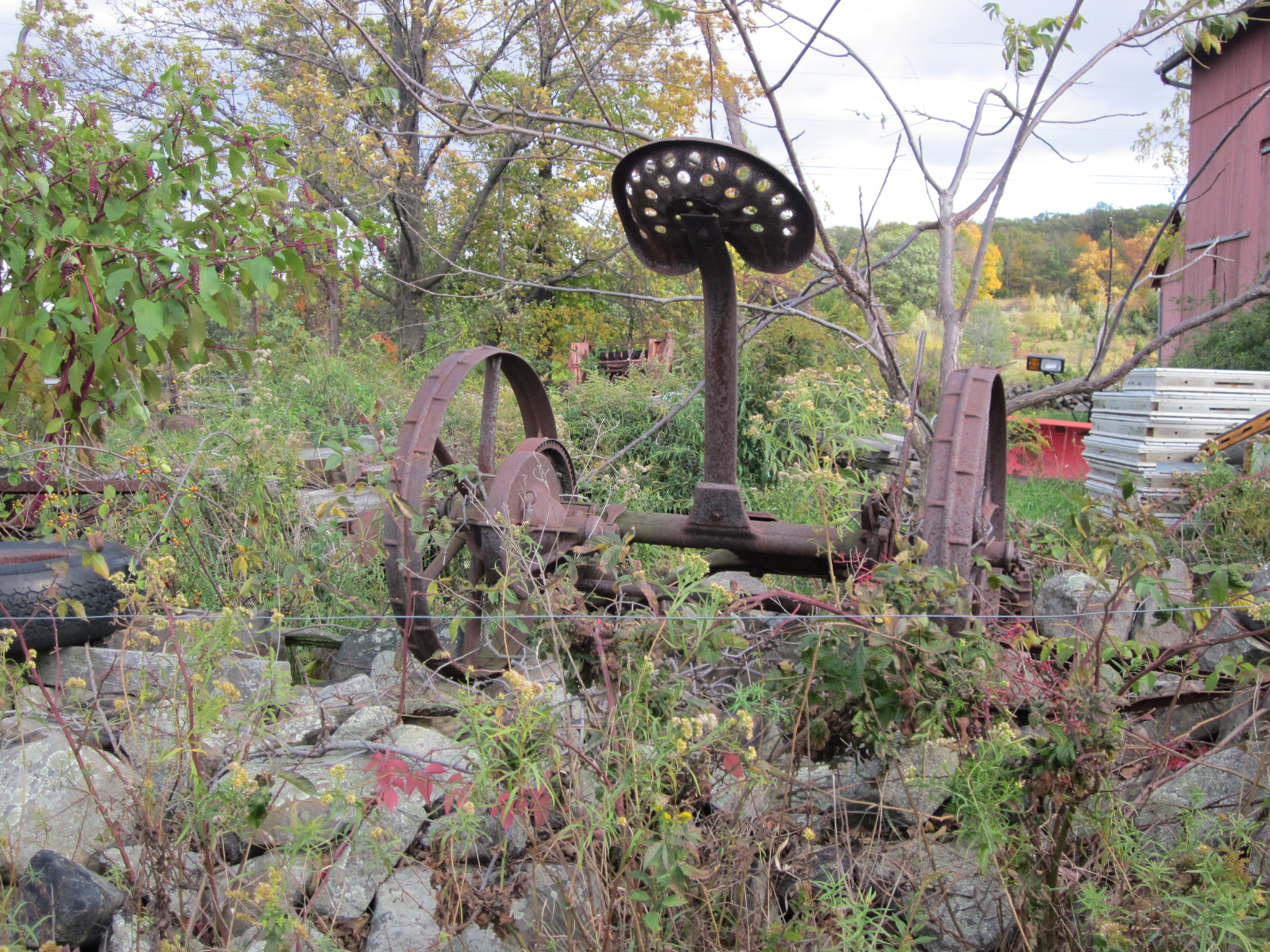
Farm Equipment

The Barretts did, however, install minimal electricity in 1948. The State of New Jersey purchased the property in 1981 and made it part of Wawayanda State Park. In 1989, the State of New Jersey planned the demolition of the farm, but the Vernon Historical Society, specifically through the work of Ron Dupont Jr. struggled to preserve it. Dupont rallied school children and compiled numerous slideshows to show the historic significance of the farm. His efforts were successful, and High Breeze Farm was listed on the State and National Registers of Historic Places. High Breeze Farm is now the only remaining farm on Wawayanda Mountain. The main house, barn, and outbuildings remain, and are displayed as part of the “living history museum,” as it was restored in 1992. The farm also displays historic farm equipment including mowers, sickle bars, and wrought iron wheels that were used by the Barretts.

== Present-day ==
Bill Becker now operates High Breeze Farm as a working farm devoted to preserving traditional farming methods. The farm offers Certified Naturally Grown produce, maple syrup, eggs, pork, and beef. By practicing “Naturally Grown” techniques, which are based on the USDA National Organic Program standards, High Breeze maintains many traditional historical practices, rather than choosing to utilize “modern” pesticides and fertilizers or more mechanized agricultural techniques.

=== Events ===
High Breeze Farm served as the grounds for the Black Powder Association's annual encampment in 2009 and 2010. At this encampment, members of the Black Powder Association reenact pre-1840s American culture through dress, props, crafts, and activities. Different groups choose different time periods between American colonization and the 1840s. Members representing different periods camps separately, in an attempt to preserve the historical integrity of the reenactment. Some camp out in teepees or tents, while others construct lean-tos. The encampment also features a competition known as the “Seneca Run,” where competitors must start a fire with a tinderbox, flint, and steel, use bows and arrows, and fire black powder muskets.

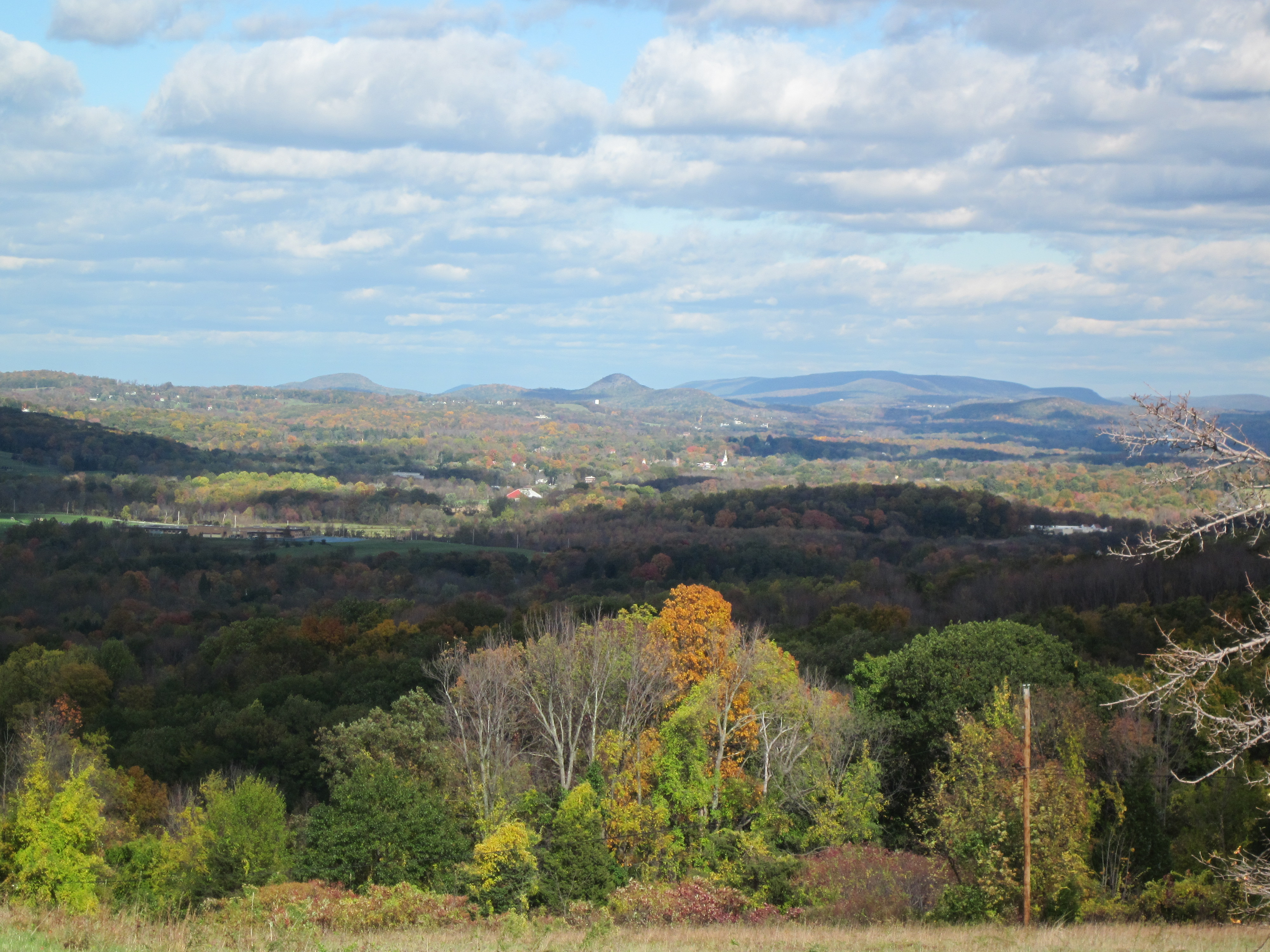
View From High Breeze

With fifty sugar maple trees on the property, people also use the boiling of sap into maple syrup as an opportunity to celebrate the historic background of High Breeze Farm. People, including members of the Black Powder Association, dress for the syrup-boiling event in period clothing from anywhere between 1720 and 1840. They discuss the historic methods of syrup boiling, and use the weekend for festivities such as crafts, cooking, and shooting in the style of the historic period they choose to represent.

As part of Wawayanda State Park, High Breeze Farm is also a destination for hikers. Wawayanda has 40 miles of bicycle and hiking trails, including an 11-mile section of the Appalachian Trail. The farm also serves as a lookout point of an extensive view over Orange County, New York.
