= Wallpack Center, New Jersey =

Populated place in Sussex County, New Jersey, US

- Unincorporated community
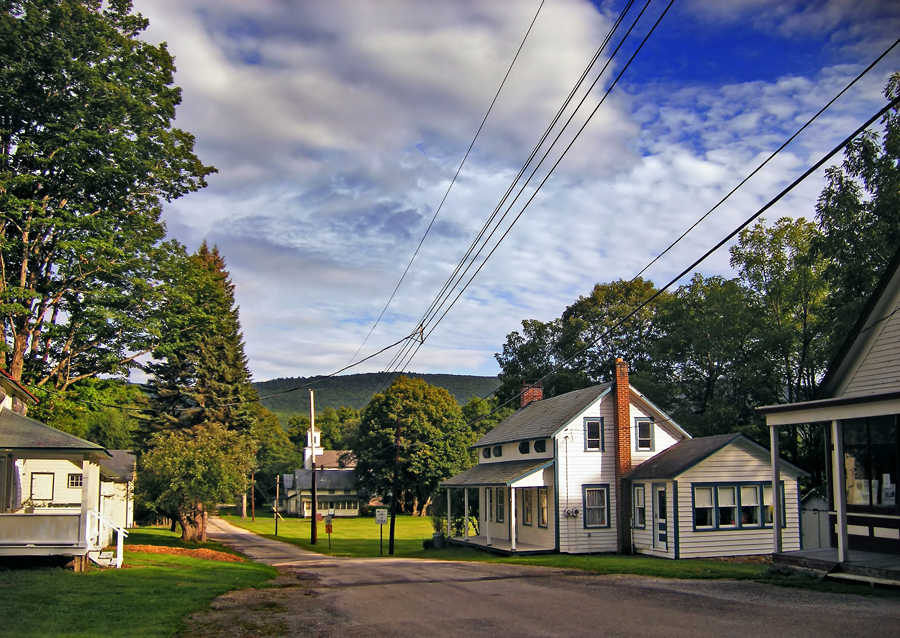
- Downtown Wallpack Center

- Location within Sussex County, New Jersey Location within New Jersey Location within the United States
- Coordinates: 41°09′32″N 74°52′49″W
- Country: United States
- State: New Jersey
- County: Sussex
- Township: Walpack
- Elevation: 453 ft (138 m)
- Time zone: UTC−05:00 (Eastern (EST))
  - Summer (DST): UTC−04:00 (EDT)
- ZIP Code: 07881
- Area code: 908
- GNIS feature ID: 881503

Wallpack Center (also known as Walpack Center) is an unincorporated community located within Walpack Township, Sussex County, in the U.S. state of New Jersey. Wallpack Center is located in the Flat Brook Valley 6.7 miles (10.8 km) west of Branchville. Wallpack Center has a post office with ZIP Code 07881. It is now part of the Delaware Water Gap National Recreation Area.

== History ==
Wallpack Center was established as a farming community in the mid-1800s. The community, which is located in a rural area, functioned as a service center for the surrounding farms. Due to its isolated location, the community only served farmers within its valley, which could not easily go to other communities for services. In the 1900s, the community declined as larger settlements were able to serve the farms in the region.

The community presently includes the post office, a church, a former school used for storage, and six houses.

== Historic district ==
- Wallpack Center Historic District
- U.S. National Register of Historic Places
- U.S. Historic district
- New Jersey Register of Historic Places
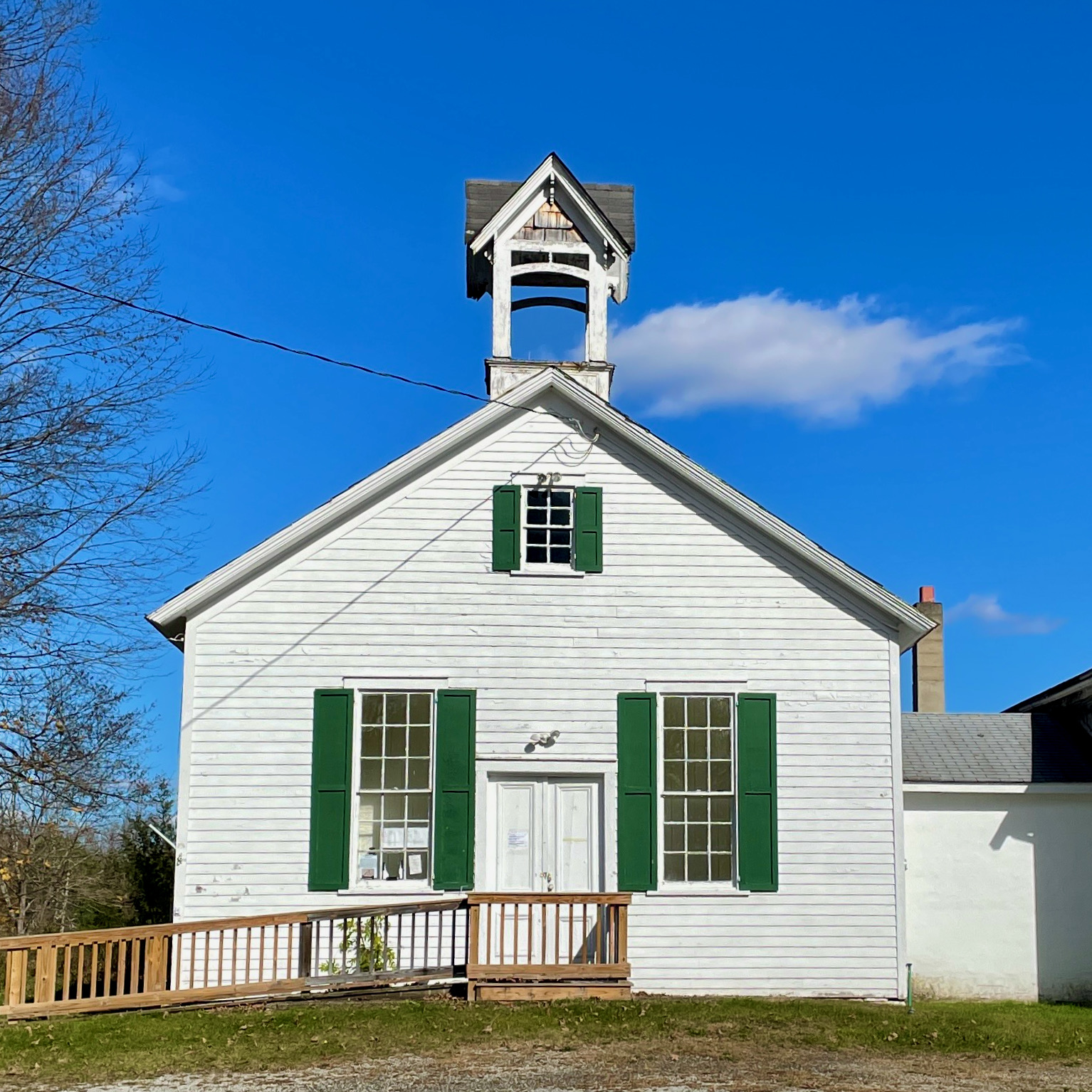
- One-room Schoolhouse
- Location: Wallpack Center Road
- Area: 16 acres (6.5 ha)
- Architectural style: Late Victorian, Italianate
- NRHP reference No.: 80000354
- NJRHP No.: 2645

Significant dates
- Added to NRHP: July 17, 1980
- Designated NJRHP: July 5, 1979

The Wallpack Center Historic District is a 16-acre (6.5 ha) historic district encompassing the community. It was added to the National Register of Historic Places on July 17, 1980 for its significance in agriculture, architecture, and exploration/settlement. The district includes 8 contributing buildings.

The one-room schoolhouse was built c. 1856. The Methodist Church was built in 1871 and features Italianate architecture.

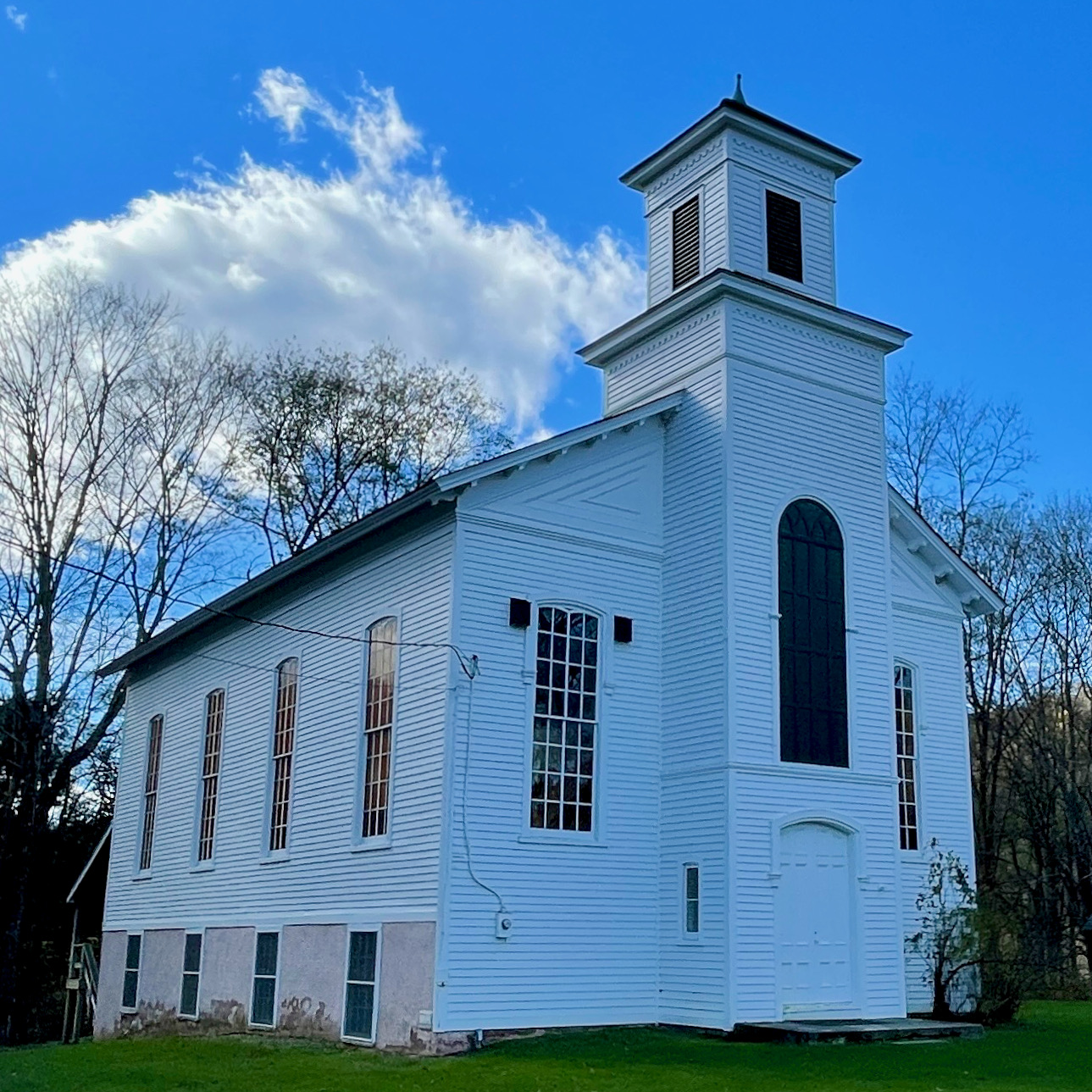
Methodist Church

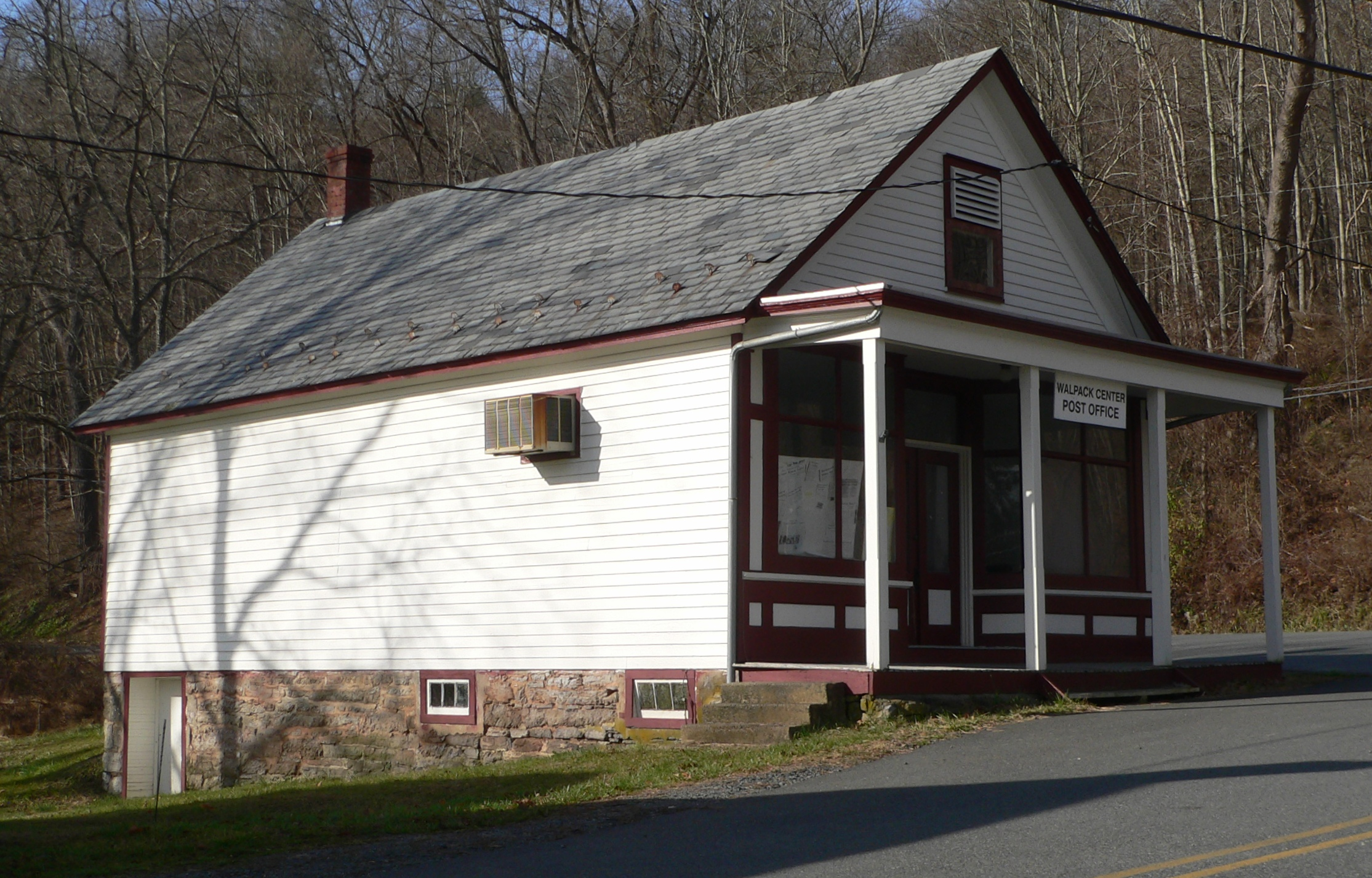
General Store and Post Office
