= Old Newton Burial Ground =

Historic cemetery in Sussex County, New Jersey

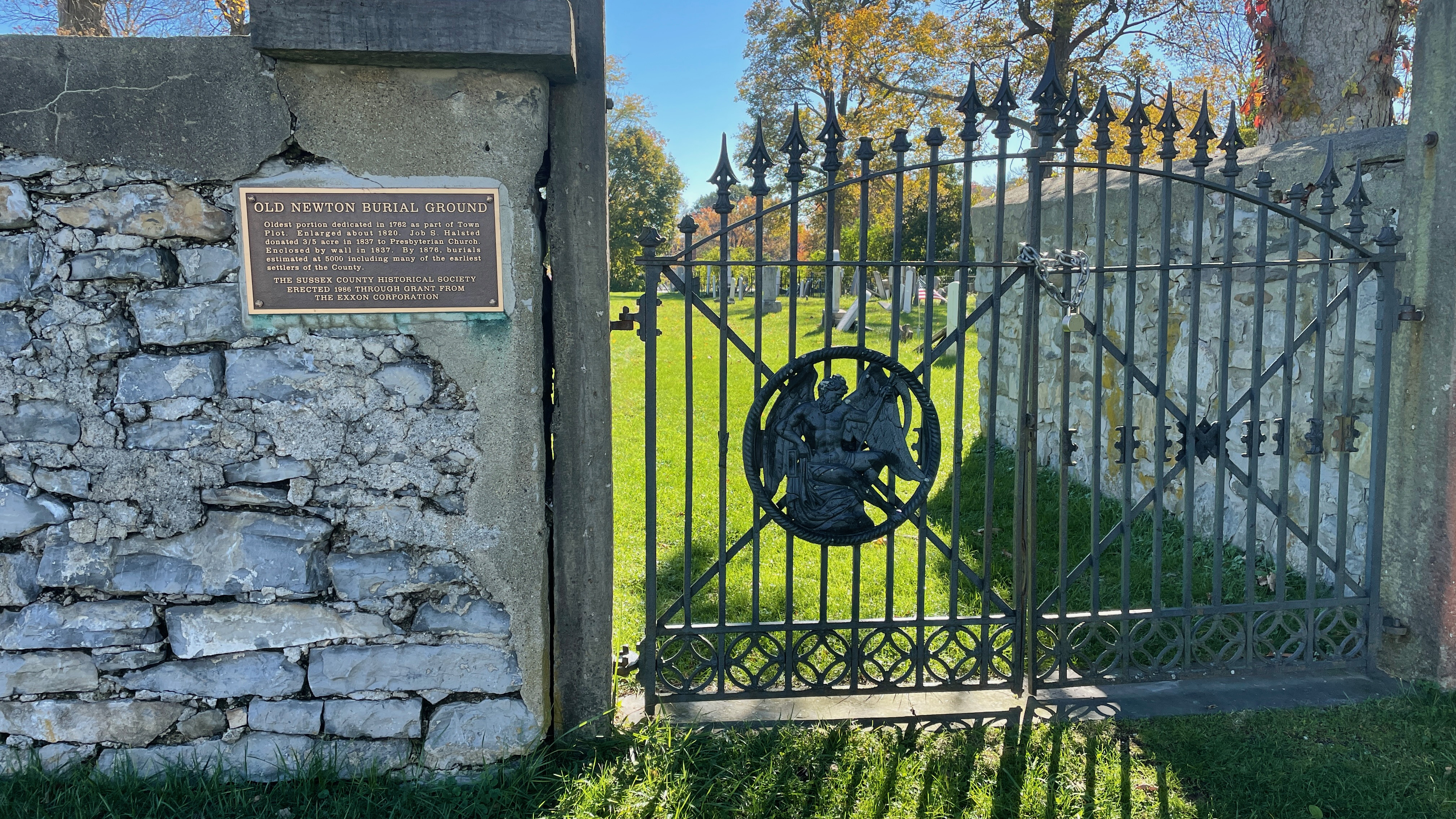
- Entrance with cast-iron gates
- Interactive map of Old Newton Burial Ground

Details
- Established: 1762
- Location: Southeast of Main Street (U.S. Route 206); Newton, Sussex County, New Jersey
- Country: United States
- Coordinates: 41°3′22″N 74°45′10″W
- Owned by: Newton Cemetery Company
- Size: 1.66 acres (0.67 ha)
- No. of interments: 1,287 transcribed

The Old Newton Burial Ground is a historic cemetery located in Newton, Sussex County, New Jersey. The cemetery was the primary burial ground in the town for a century after its establishment in 1762. As the burial ground would reach capacity, the state legislature incorporated the Newton Cemetery Company which began operating a new cemetery in 1867. After this time, interments would continue at the old burial ground intermittently until 1943. The burial ground contains the graves of members of local families from Newton and the surrounding areas, and includes several local and state political figures, prominent citizens, and veterans. While nineteenth-century sources attest 5,000 burials within the cemetery, a recent transcription lists only 1,287 individual known graves.

Old Newton Burial Ground is not in operation. The 1.66-acre (0.67 ha) property is owned by the Newton Cemetery Company. It is maintained in cooperation with the Sussex County Historical Society and Sussex County Sheriff's Office. (Note: The Sussex County Sheriff's Office oversees inmates and other persons sentenced by the courts to perform community service through its Sheriff's Labor Assistance Program and Sheriff's Work Assistance Program in maintenance and landscaping work.) The Old Newton Burial Ground was included as a contributing property within the Newton Town Plot Historic District, and listed on the National Register of Historic Places in 1992.

== History ==
The Old Newton Burial Ground was established as a part of Jonathan Hampton's Town Plot (1762) which formed the historic core of the Town of Newton including properties around the county's courthouse (built 1762–65) and town green. (Note: The Newtown Precinct, later Newtown Township and Newtown Township, was established in 1751. The town of Newton first started in the 1760s as a village called Sussex Court House, was renamed when the post office was renamed in 1797 to Newtown and later Newton. The Town of Newton in its present form was incorporated in 1864 when Newtown Township was divided for the final time.) The burial ground was expanded twice. In 1820, Daniel Stuart (died 1822) deeded a 0.4-acre (0.16 ha) parcel along the graveyard's northeast. In 1837, Job and Ann Halstead conveyed a parcel of 0.59 acres (0.24 ha) to the town's Presbyterian church "for a place of interment of the dead free for all persons desirous of Burying upon the said lot of land". In that year, the entire graveyard was enclosed by a stone wall (previously it was bound by "wooden coping"). Approximately 100 feet (30 m) of this wall was removed in 1966 and replaced with chain-link fence. The cemetery's entrance is through a gate on the Main Street featuring double-leaf cast-iron entry gates. The gates were decorated with "medallions, bearing a bas-relief of Father Time with scythe and hourglass" of which one of the two survive.

The burial ground contains the graves of the members of several families who were involved in the eighteenth- and nineteenth-century settlement and growth of Newton and the surrounding areas. Among them are individuals who were local and state political figures, as well as local business leaders and prominent citizens. The burial ground contains the graves of veterans of the French and Indian War, American Revolution, Barbary War, War of 1812, American Civil War, and other conflicts. The number of persons buried in the Old Newton Burial Ground is unknown. Records were not complete. The Sussex Register, a local newspaper, estimated that it was "no less than 5,000" by 1876. According to historian Kevin Wright, "George Watson Roy inventoried the tombstones in the old cemetery. He claimed that there were 3,023 graves visible with 2,667 tombstones. Between October 1890 and January 1911, however, he actually recorded inscriptions from 857 grave markers representing the burials of 933 individuals." The Sussex County Historical Society's transcription of burials lists 1,287 individual known graves.

On 24 September 1992, the Old Newton Burial Ground was included on the New Jersey Register of Historic Places as part of the Newton Town Plot Historic District which was approved and entered on the National Register of Historic Places on 12 November 1992. The historic district includes 56 contributing structures and properties over 17.20 acres located on Jonathan Hampton's surveyed town plot.

The property is overseen by the Newton Cemetery Company and maintained in cooperation with the Sussex County Historical Society and Sussex County Sheriff's Office—a partnership that was organized through the efforts of historian Robert R. Longcore (1931-2013). The burial ground is adjacent to the Negro Burial Ground, a 0.224 acres (0.091 ha) property bequeathed by Thomas Ryerson.

== Notable burials ==
Notable burials amongst those interred at the Old Newton Burial Ground include:

- Colonel Thomas Anderson (1742–1805), lawyer, judge, who served in the American Revolution as quartermaster for the Continental Army and later as Sussex County Surrogate.
- Thomas Oakley Anderson (1783–1844), United States naval officer involved in the burning of the USS Philadelphia at Tripoli (1804), Barbary Wars (1803–05), son of Col. Thomas Anderson.
- William T. Anderson (1777–1850), attorney, New Jersey state senator (Legislative Council), 1821.
- The Rev. Walter Chamberlin (1822–1909), Methodist clergyman, served churches in Pennsylvania, New York and New Jersey, including nearby churches at Stillwater, Blairstown, and Stanhope.
- The Rev. James Cooke Edwards (1807–1880), Presbyterian minister in New York City, Smithtown, New York, and Morristown, New Jersey.
- Colonel Grant Fitch (1782–1848), founder, publisher of The New Jersey Herald (1829)
- David Ryerson (1782–1848), New Jersey state senator (Legislative Council), 1829–31, 1835.
- Henry Ogden Ryerson (1826–1864), Colonel in the American Civil War, prisoner of war in Richmond and Libby Prison, killed at Battle of Spotsylvania, son of Thomas C. Ryerson.
- Thomas Coxe Ryerson (1788–1838), attorney, New Jersey Supreme Court justice (1834–38), New Jersey state senator (Legislative Council), 1825–26, 1828.
- The Rev. Dr. Joseph Linn Shafer (1787–1853), pastor of the First Presbyterian Church of Newton, 1812–35 and 1838–53.
- The Rev. Garrett Van Horn (1816–1882), minister at Newton Methodist Church, and later at Middletown, Orange County, New York.

== Gallery ==
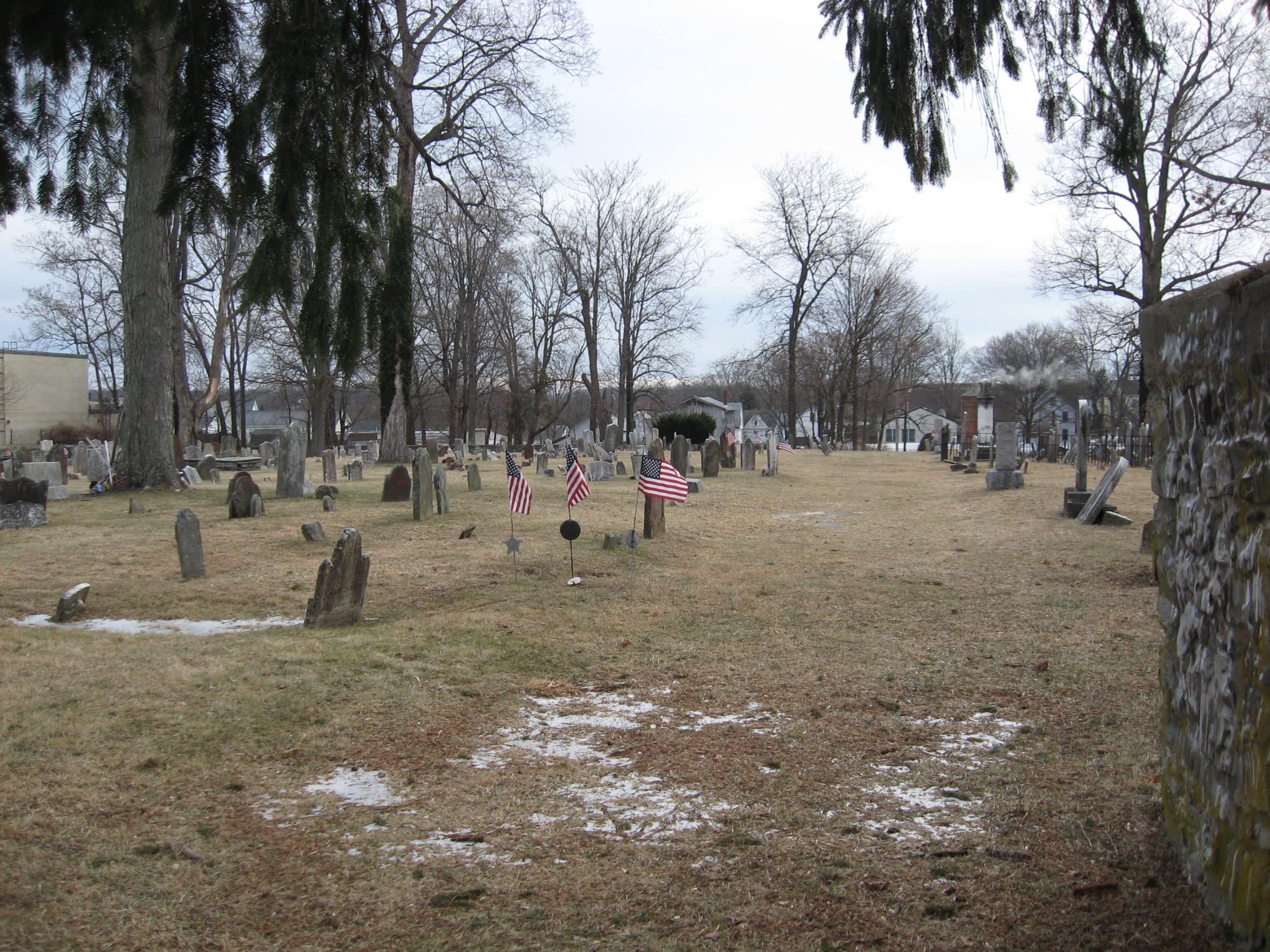
View of the graveyard seen from inside the gates

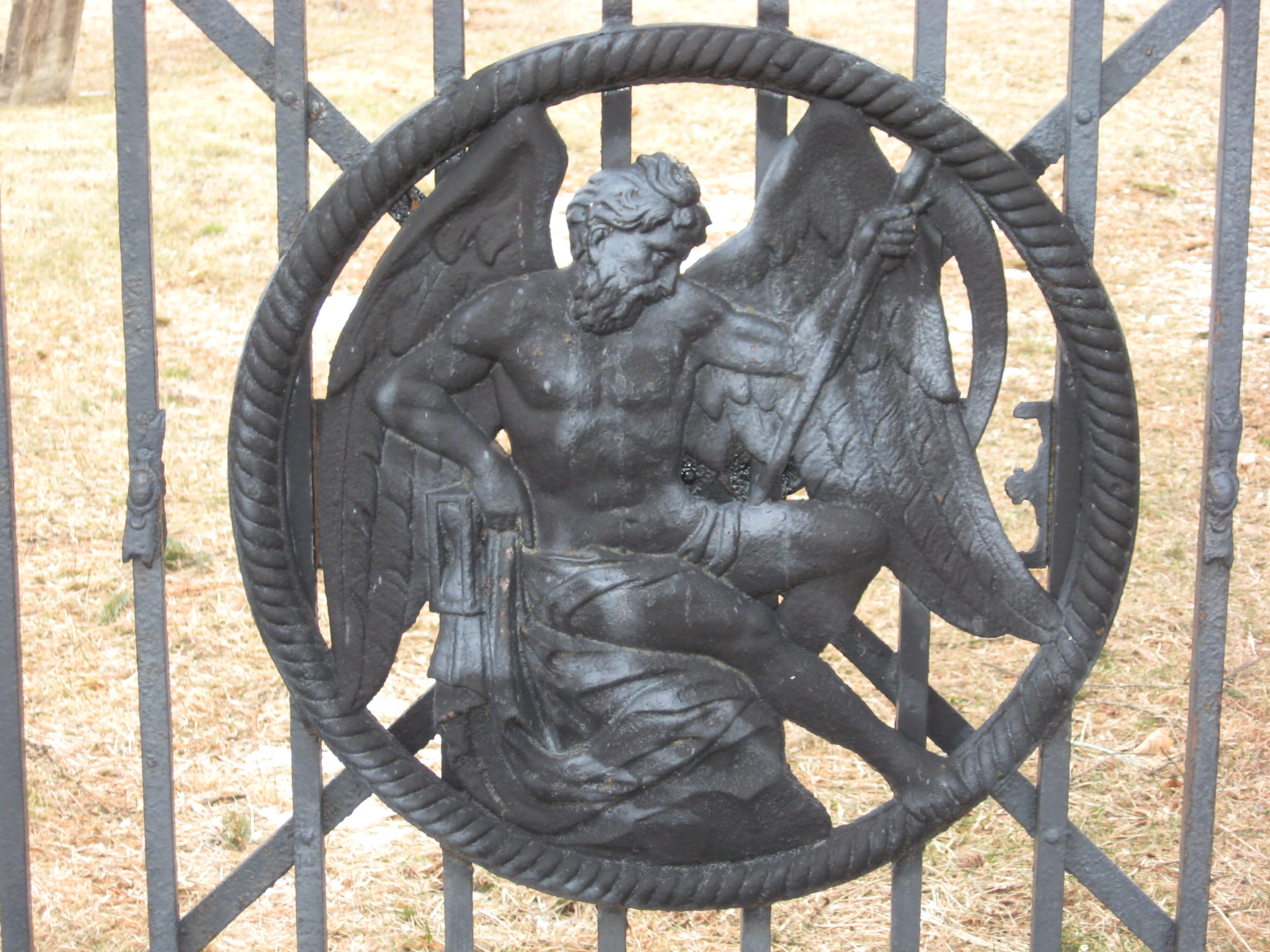
Detail of the "Father Time" medallion on the burial ground's wrought iron gates

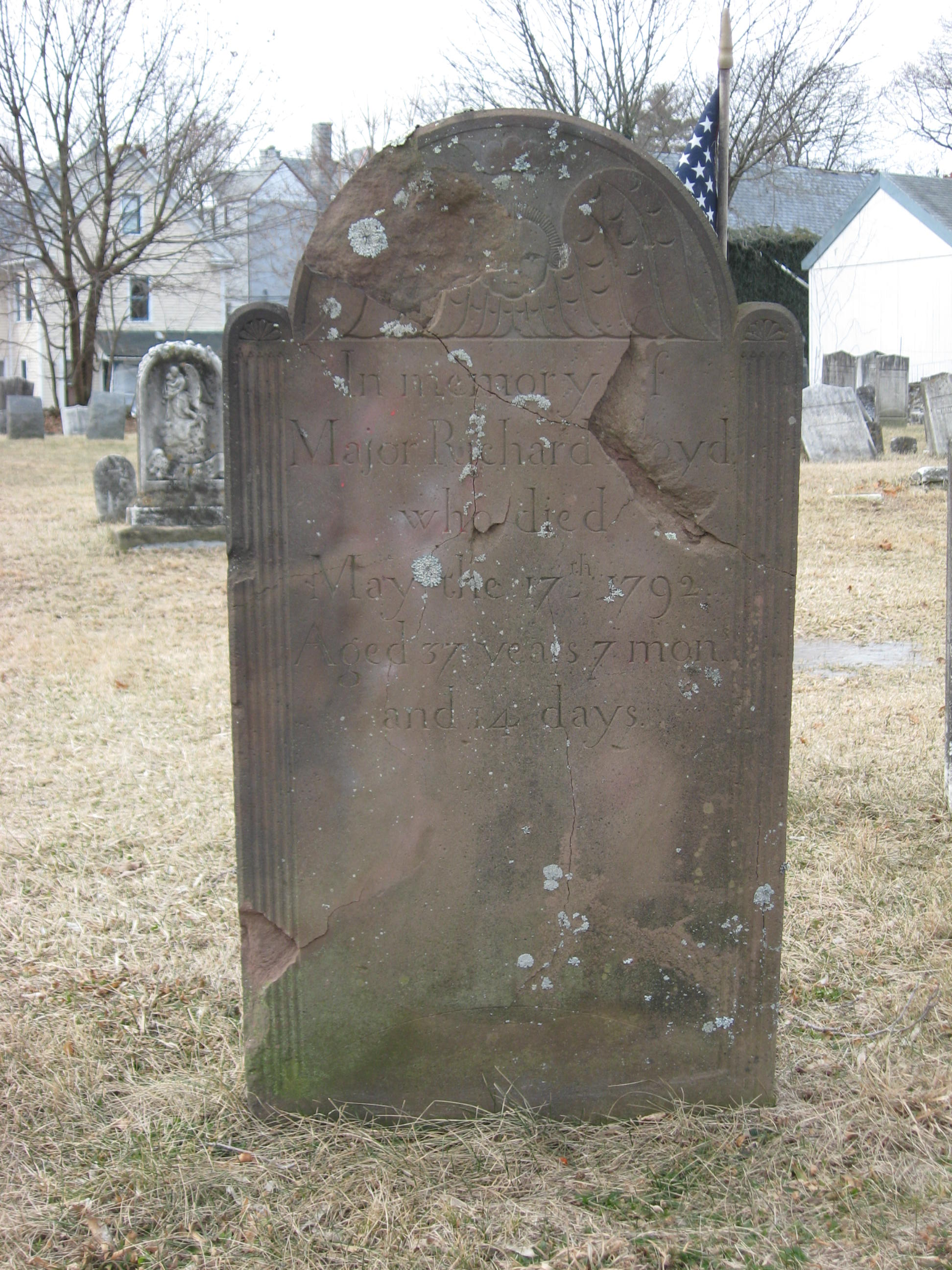
Grave of Revolutionary War officer Major Richard Boyd, died 1792

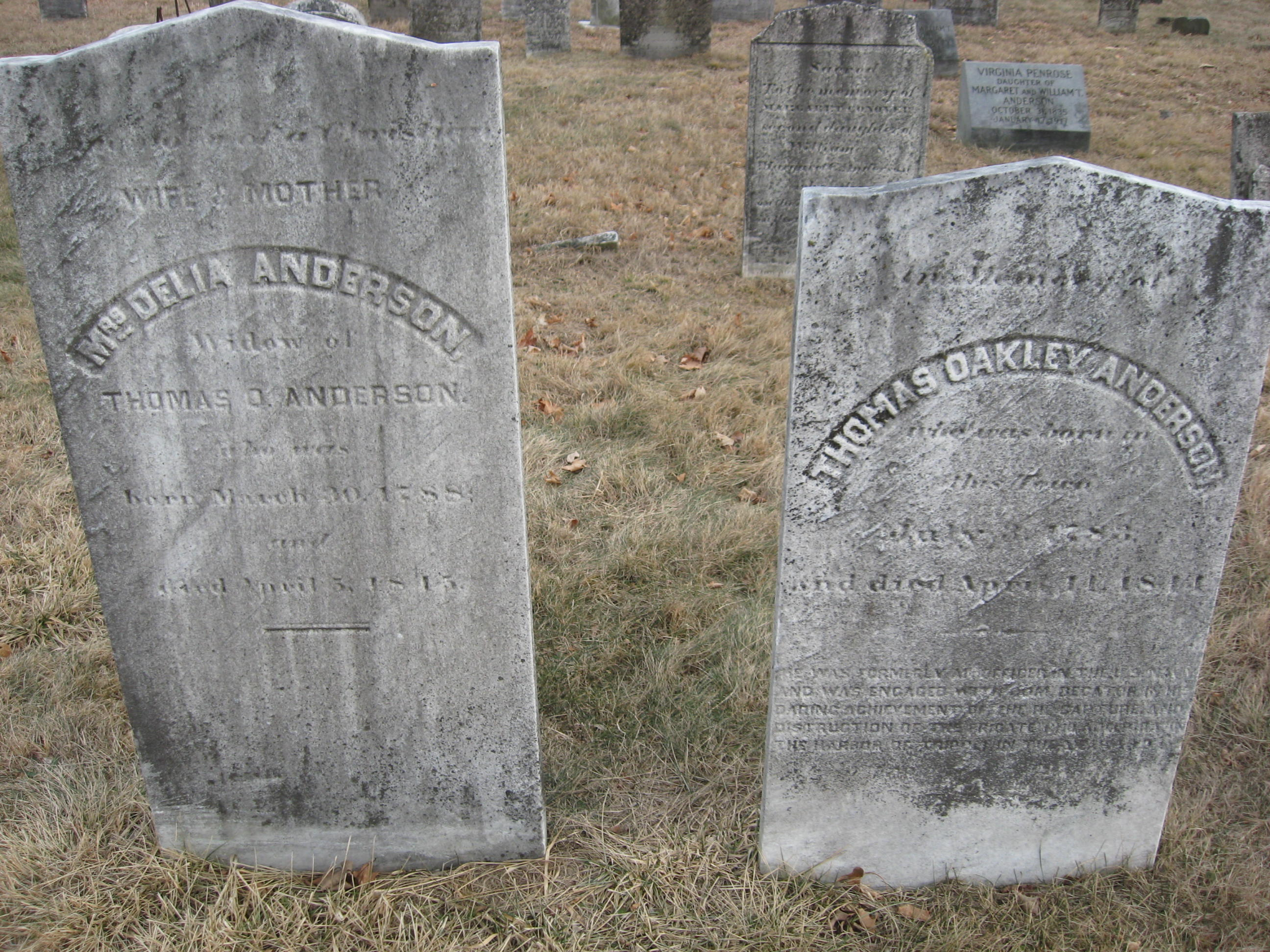
Grave of naval officer and Barbary War veteran Thomas Oakley Anderson and his wife Delia

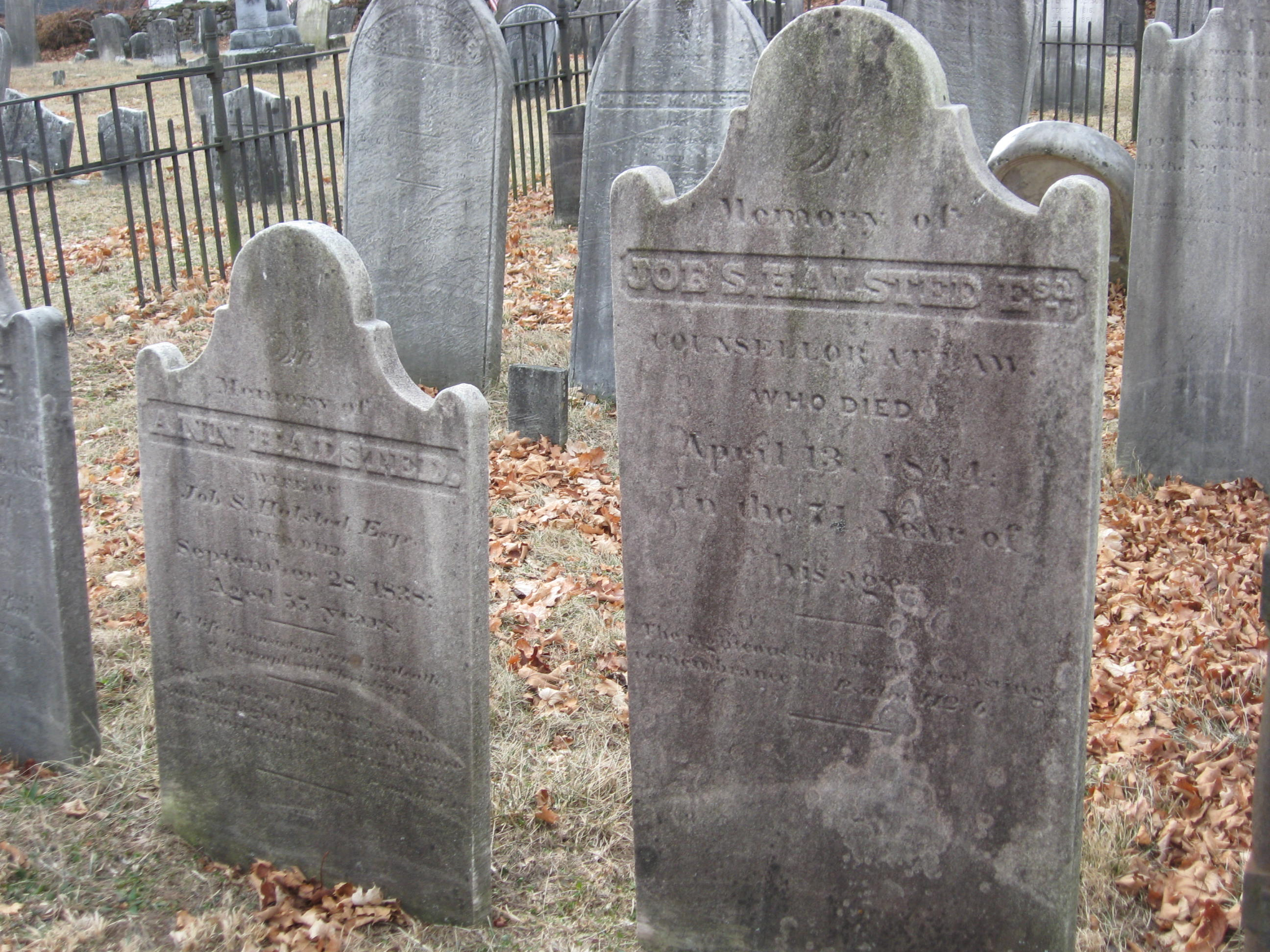
Graves of Job S. Halsted and his wife Ann, who gave land to enlarge the burial ground

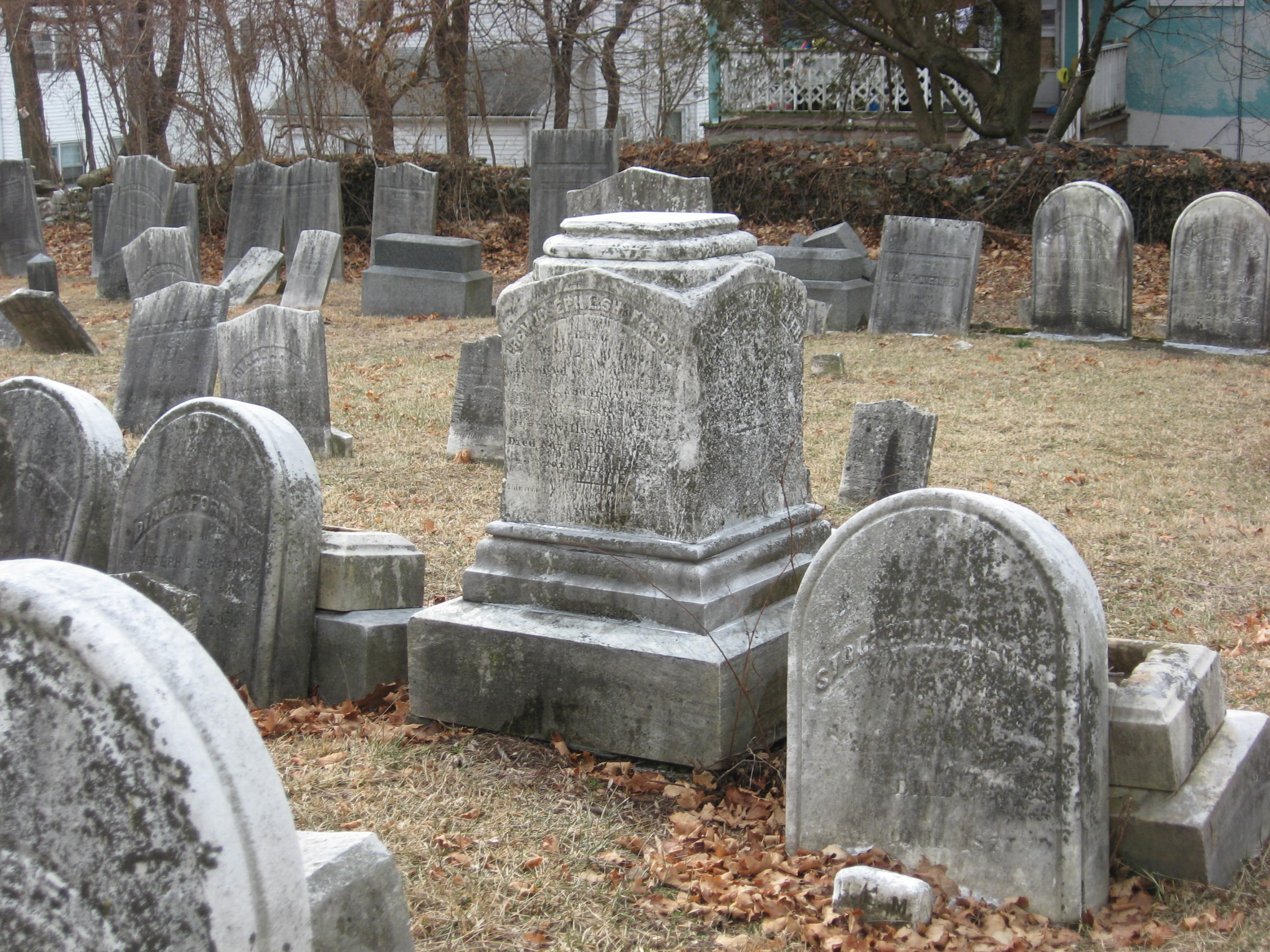
Grave of the Rev. Joseph L Shafer, pastor of the First Presbyterian Church of Newton
