= Susanna Bokoyni =

Hungarian circus performer (1879–1984)

- Born: 24 April 1879; Hungary
- Died: 24 August 1984 (aged 105); Newton, New Jersey, United States
- Other names: Princess Susanna
- Occupation(s): Circus performer, dancer
- Known for: Longest-lived dwarf certified by Guinness World Records

Susanna Bokoyni (24 April 1879 – 24 August 1984), also known as "Princess Susanna", was a Hungarian centenarian and circus performer who was listed in Guinness World Records as the longest-lived dwarf on record.

== Early life and career ==
Bokoyni was born in Hungary on 24 April 1879. Medical doctors told her family that she would not live past age seven. At age 16, she became a dancer at Budapest's Orpheum Theater. She later toured with Rose's Parisian Midget Follies and Buffalo Bill's Wild West Show where she performed a tightrope act.

== Later life and death ==
In 1972, the nonagenarian Bokoyni moved to Newton, New Jersey and settled at the Merriam House Retirement Home. On 24 August 1984, she died at age 105 at Newton Memorial Hospital. She was interred at Glenwood Cemetery in Vernon, New Jersey.

== See also ==
- List of centenarians (actors, filmmakers and entertainers)
