= Sussex County Courthouse (New Jersey) =

- U.S. National Register of Historic Places
- New Jersey Register of Historic Places
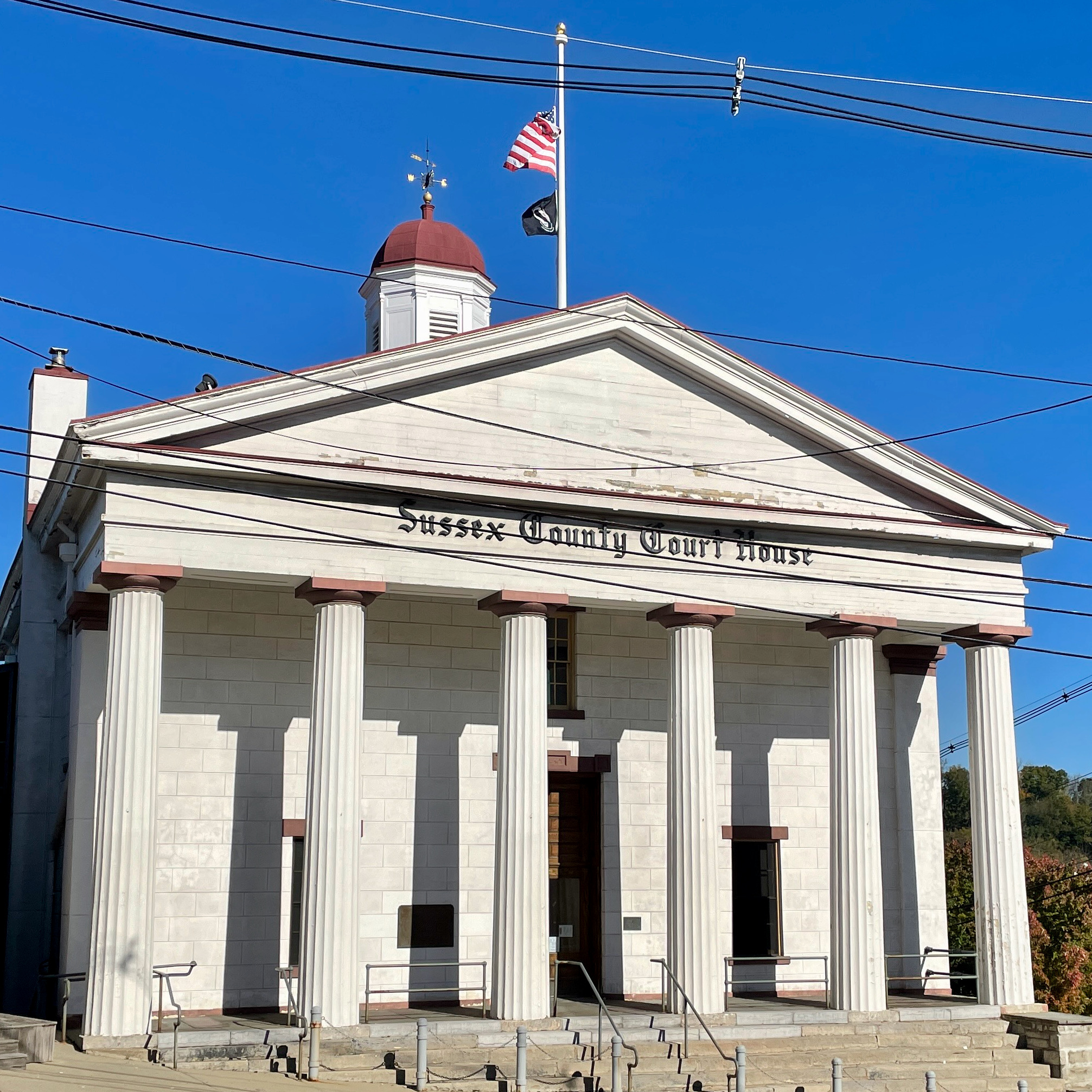

- Location within Sussex County, New Jersey Location within New Jersey Location within the United States
- Location: High and Spring Streets, Newton, New Jersey
- Coordinates: 41°3′32″N 74°45′14″W
- Area: 0.8 acres (0.32 ha)
- Built: 1765; 261 years ago 1847; 179 years ago (rebuilt)
- Architect: Fowler & Andrews; Amos A. Harrison
- Architectural style: Greek Revival
- NRHP reference No.: 79001523
- NJRHP No.: 2618

Significant dates
- Added to NRHP: July 23, 1979
- Designated NJRHP: May 9, 1979

Sussex County Courthouse is located at the corner of High and Spring Streets in Newton, the county seat of Sussex County, New Jersey in the United States. It is part 10th vicinage of the New Jersey Superior Court.

It was originally built in 1765 and rebuilt in 1847. It is one of the courthouses dating from the 18th century and among the oldest courthouses in the United States still in active use. It was added to the National Register of Historic Places on July 23, 1979 for its significance in architecture, using Greek Revival temple style.

== History ==
The courthouse was the site of a daring raid during the American Revolution by one of the Loyalists' best operatives, Lieutenant James Moody. In 1780, Moody led several men to free eight Loyalist prisoners held in the Sussex County Courthouse. Moody freed the men and fled with them. Despite a pursuit lasting several days, Revolutionary forces failed to capture them. The court was gutted by fire in 1847 and rebuilt within the original fieldstone walls.

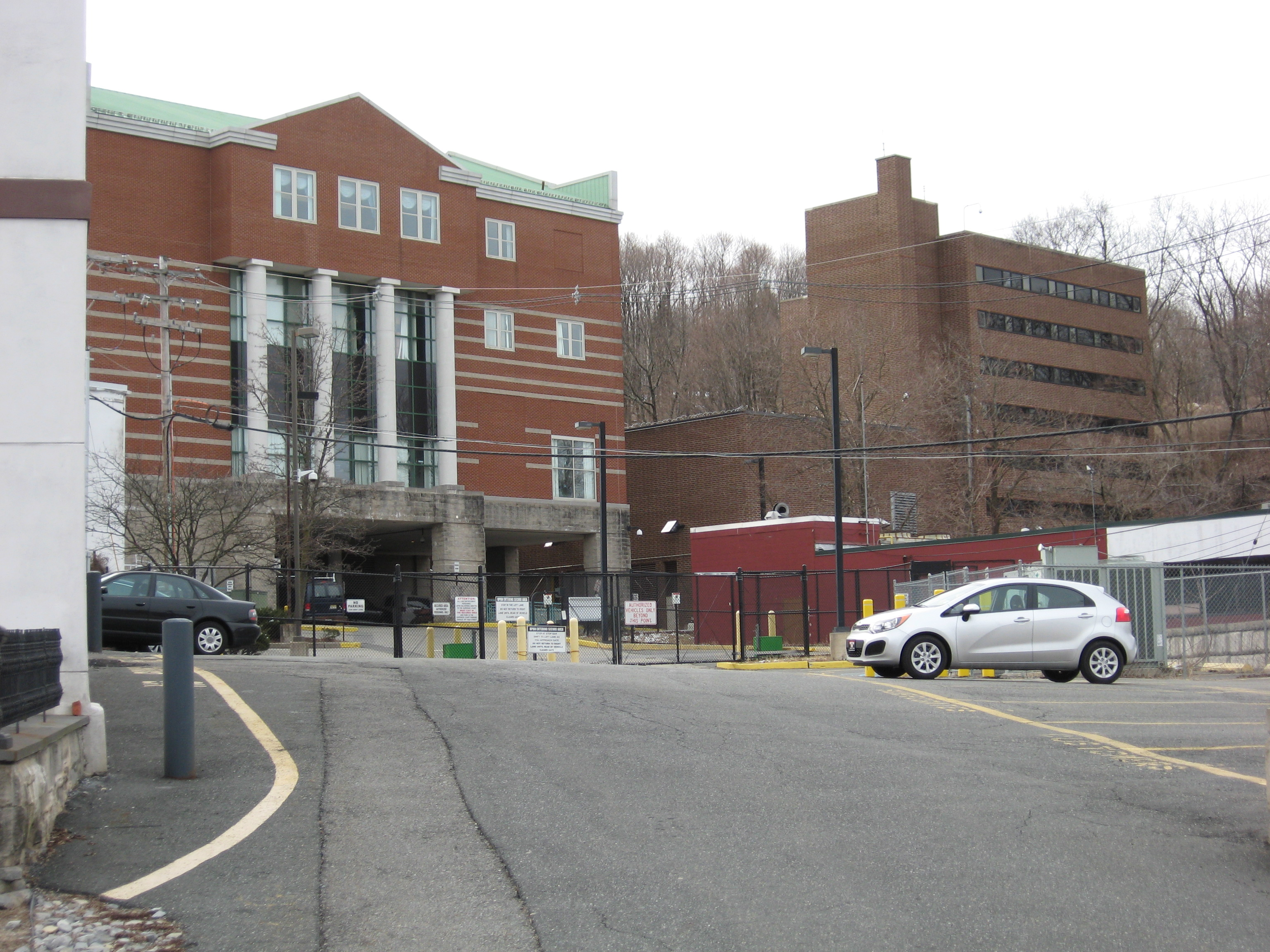
Sussex County Judicial Complex

The old courthouse continues to handle judicial proceedings in conjunction with a newer Sussex County Judicial Center built in 1992.

== See also ==
- County courthouses in New Jersey
- Richard J. Hughes Justice Complex
- National Register of Historic Places listings in Sussex County, New Jersey
- List of the oldest courthouses in the United States
