= Johnny Budd =

American football player (1899–1963)

No. 16, 14
- Positions: Tackle, Guard, Kicker

Personal information
- Born: January 14, 1899; Newton, New Jersey, U.S.
- Died: December 26, 1963 (aged 64); Fountain Hill, Pennsylvania, U.S.
- Listed height: 5 ft 11 in (1.80 m)
- Listed weight: 246 lb (112 kg)

Career information
- High school: Blairstown (NJ) Blair Academy
- College: Lafayette

Career history
- Frankford Yellow Jackets (1926); Pottsville Maroons (1927–1928)

Awards and highlights
- NFL champion (1926); Chicago Tribune: 1st team all-NFL (1926); GB Press-Gazette: 1st team all-NFL (1926)
- Stats at Pro Football Reference

John Walter Budd (January 14, 1899 – December 26, 1963) was a professional football player from Newton, New Jersey. He was a tackle and guard and also served as a kicker. Budd played college football for Lafayette College before making his National Football League (NFL) debut in 1926 with the Frankford Yellow Jackets. After helping the Yellow Jackets win the 1926 NFL Championship, he later joined the Pottsville Maroons for the 1927 and 1928 seasons. Budd was a first-team All-Pro in 1926.
