= James Moody (loyalist) =

American-born military officer, landowner and politician (1744–1809)

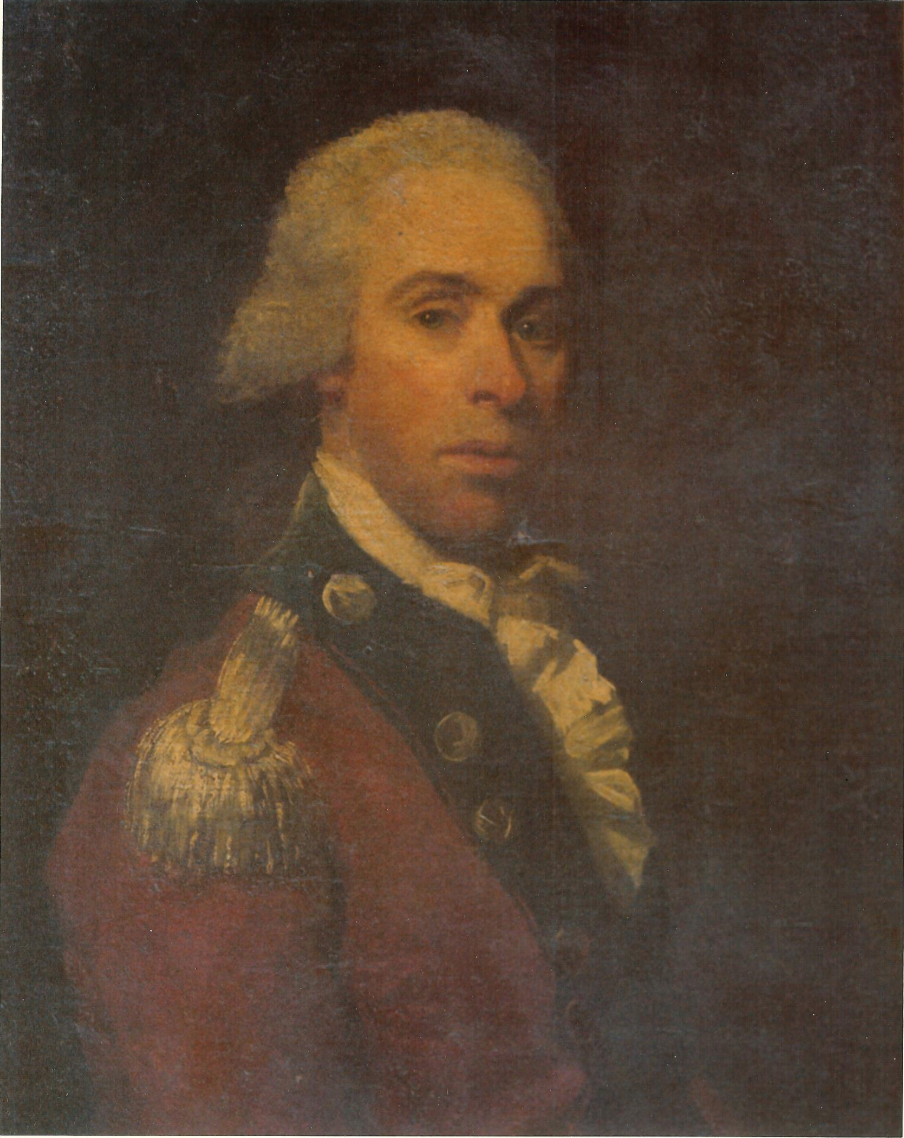
Portrait of Moody in the uniform of the New Jersey Volunteers

James Moody (January 1, 1744 – April 6, 1809) was an American-born military officer, landowner and politician who served in the New Jersey Volunteers during the American Revolutionary War. Following the war he emigrated to Nova Scotia and represented Annapolis County in the Nova Scotia House of Assembly from 1793 to 1806. Moody wrote one of the most well-known Loyalist memoires of the war.

== Career ==
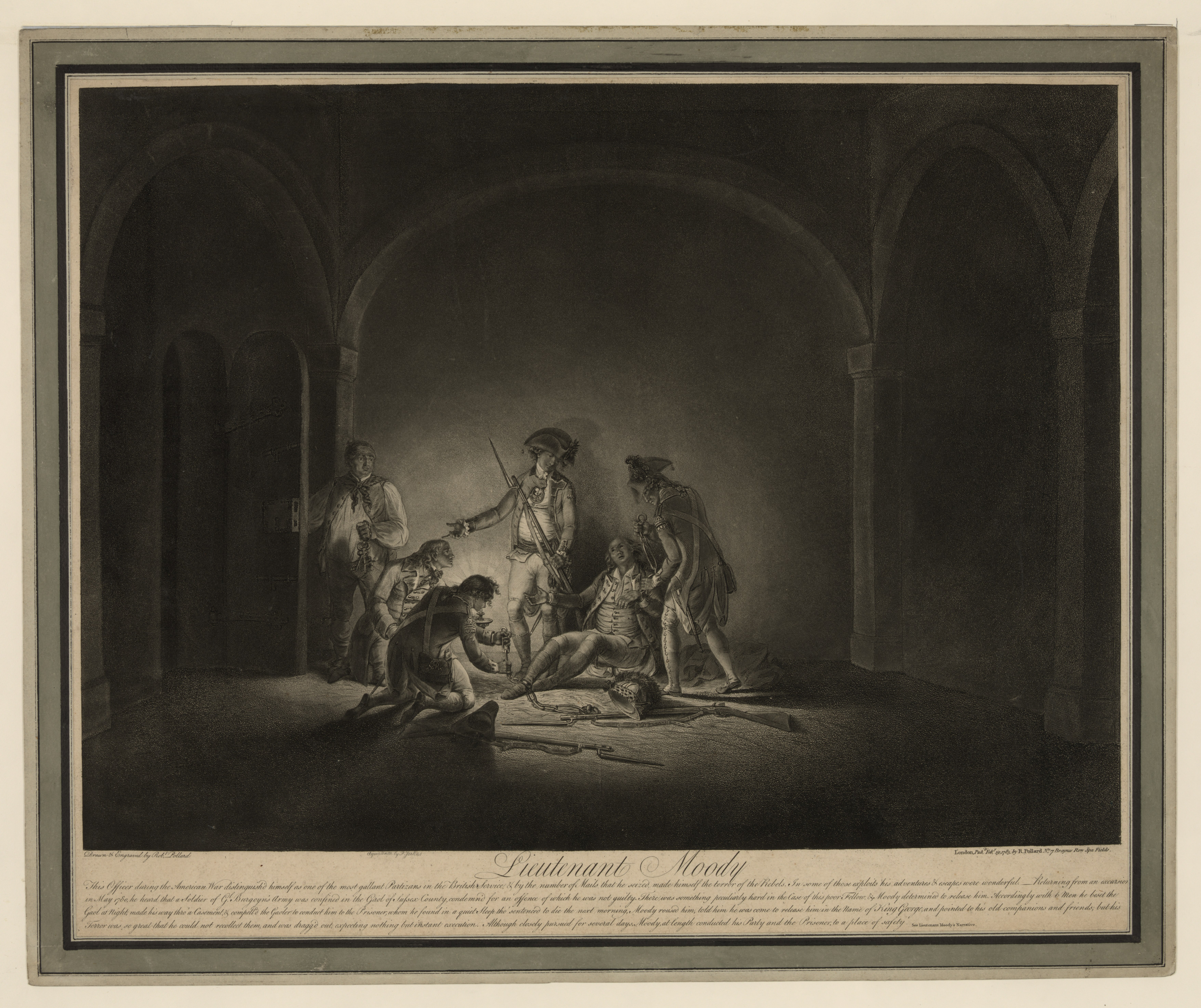
Engraving of Moody freeing a British prisoner of war from American captivity

He was born in Little Egg Harbor, New Jersey, on January 1, 1744, the son of John Moody. His first wife was Elizabeth Brittain (1748–1782). James and Elizabeth had three children including a son John born March 6, 1768, and a daughter Maria born on February 28, 1775. Records for the other child have been lost. His father-in-law William Brittain (1725–1804) was an outspoken Loyalist, though only the three youngest of his six sons were also Loyalists.

By 1777, James and his family were living on a 500-acre farm owned in his father's name, but for James' use. On Sunday, March 28, 1777, a Patriot militia came to his house to arrest him because he refused to give up his allegiance to Britain and swear loyalty to the United States. Shots were fired, but he managed to escape. In April 1777, he joined the New Jersey Volunteers under the command of General Cortlandt Skinner. On 22 August 1777, his battalion fought in the Battle of Staten Island, losing 30 men. In 1780, Moody led several men to free eight Loyalist prisoners held in the Sussex County Courthouse in Newton, Sussex County, New Jersey. Moody freed the men and fled with them. Despite a pursuit lasting several days, Revolutionary forces failed to capture them.

He was captured in 1780 but managed to escape to New York City. After that, for a time, he was put into service intercepting rebel correspondence. A measure of his success was that George Washington, whose dispatches he successfully intercepted, referred to him as "that villain Moody". Following a betrayed attempt to steal the papers of Congress, Moody escaped, but his younger brother John was captured on November 8, 1781 (along with Laurence Marr) and hanged for espionage on November 13. He was only 23. In late February 1782, Moody's wife Elizabeth was thrown by a horse and killed. He married his second wife, Jane Lynson, on March 21, 1782. He went to England that same year.

Also that year, he published an account of his experiences during the American Revolution. This paints a picture of what was effectively the first American civil war played out at the personal level.

While Moody described himself as reluctantly becoming a soldier, a 20th-century American study of spies and saboteurs on both sides of the conflict credited him with being the most remarkable agent of the war.

He went to Nova Scotia in 1782 and settled at Sissaboo (later Weymouth). Moody built ships there and also constructed mills. He served as a captain in the Royal Nova Scotia Regiment, a colonel in the local militia and road commissioner. He died in Sissaboo.

== Publication ==
- Lieut. James Moody's narrative of his exertions and sufferings in the cause of government, since the year 1776: authenticated by proper certificates.

== See also ==
- Nova Scotia in the American Revolution
