= Newton, New Jersey =

Town in Sussex County, New Jersey, US

- Town
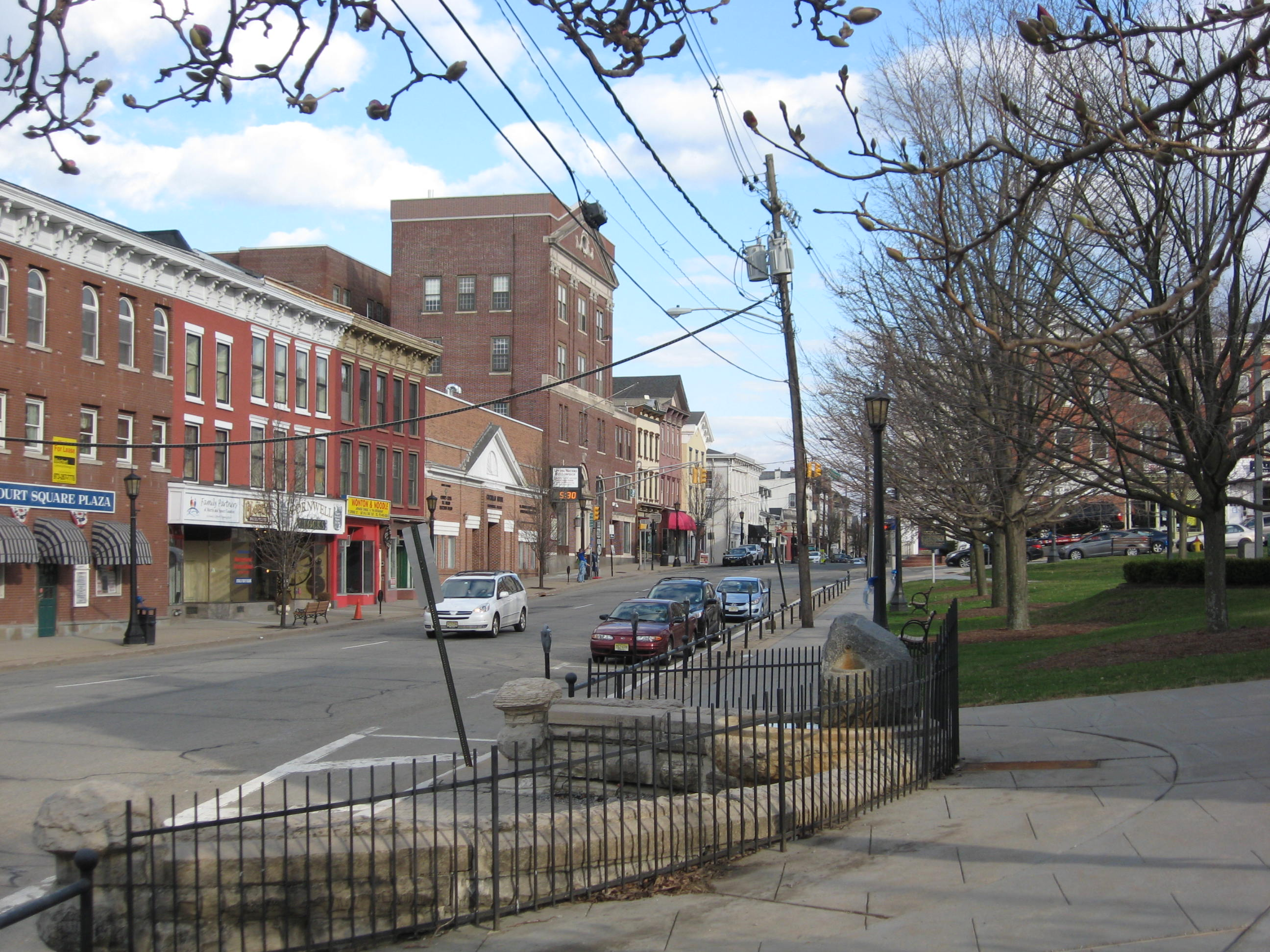
- Spring Street Commercial District as seen from the Newton Town Green

- Seal

- Location of Newton in Sussex County highlighted in red (left). Inset map: Location of Sussex County in New Jersey highlighted in orange (right).

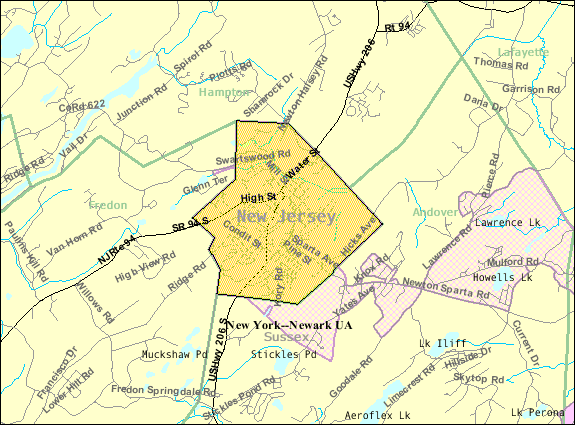
- Census Bureau map of Newton, New Jersey Interactive map of Newton, New Jersey

- Location in Sussex County Location in New Jersey Location in the United States
- Coordinates: 41.051487°N 74.753601°W
- Country: United States
- State: New Jersey
- County: Sussex
- Incorporated: April 11, 1864

Government
  - Type: Faulkner Act (council–manager)
  - Body: Town Council
  - Mayor: Helen R. Le Frois (term ends December 31, 2026)
  - Manager: Thomas S. Russo Jr.
  - Municipal clerk: Teresa A. Oswin

Area
  - Total: 3.38 sq mi (8.76 km^{2})
  - Land: 3.36 sq mi (8.70 km^{2})
  - Water: 0.023 sq mi (0.06 km^{2}) 0.65%
  - Rank: 317th of 565 in state 18th of 24 in county
- Elevation: 663 ft (202 m)

Population (2020)
  - Total: 8,374
  - Estimate (2023): 8,240
  - Rank: 283rd of 565 in state 5th of 24 in county
  - Density: 2,492.3/sq mi (962.3/km^{2})
  - Rank: 252nd of 565 in state 3rd of 24 in county
- Time zone: UTC−05:00 (Eastern (EST))
  - Summer (DST): UTC−04:00 (Eastern (EDT))
- ZIP Code: 07860
- Area code: 973 exchanges: 300, 383, 579, 940
- FIPS code: 3403751930
- GNIS feature ID: 0885322
- Website: www.newtontownhall.com

Newton, officially the Town of Newton, is an incorporated municipality in and the county seat of Sussex County in the U.S. state of New Jersey, situated approximately 60 miles (97 km) northwest of New York City. As of the 2020 United States census, the town's population was 8,374, its highest decennial population ever, an increase of 377 (+4.7%) from the 2010 census count of 7,997, which in turn reflected a decrease of 247 (−3.0%) from the 8,244 counted in the 2000 census.

One of 15 municipalities in the state organized as a town, the municipal government operates under a council-manager structure provided by the Faulkner Act, or Optional Municipal Charter Law. Newton was incorporated by an act of the New Jersey Legislature on April 11, 1864, from portions of Newton Township, which was also partitioned to create Andover Township and Hampton Township, and was then dissolved. Additional land was acquired from Andover Township in 1869 and 1927, and from Fredon Township in 1920.

== History ==
=== In the eighteenth century ===
Newton is located near the headwaters of the east branch of the Paulins Kill, a 41.6-mile (66.9 km) tributary of the Delaware River. In October 1715, Colonial surveyor Samuel Green plotted a tract of 2,500 acres (1,000 ha) at the head of the Paulins Kill, then known as the Tohokenetcunck River, on behalf of William Penn. This tract, which would not be settled for approximately 30–35 years, was part of the survey and division of the last acquisition of Native American land by the West Jersey Board of Proprietors. At the time of Green's survey, northwestern New Jersey was populated with bands of the Munsee, the northern branch of the Lenape Native Americans.

The first recorded European settler within the boundaries of present-day Newton was a German Palatine immigrant named Henry Hairlocker who arrived sometime before 1751 when he appears in Morris County records as receiving a tavern license. The Newtown Precinct, a large township, was created in 1751, and Sussex County was created from Morris two years later on June 8, 1753. (Note: Created in 1739, Morris County encompassed the area of present-day Morris County, Sussex County (created 1753), and Warren County (created from Sussex in 1824) in northwestern New Jersey. Sussex County was created with four large precincts (or townships)—Walpack (created before 1731), Greenwich (created 1738), Hardwick (1750), and Newtown (1751).) The township would be named Newtown after the colonial village of Newtown in Queens, New York from where the Pettit family originated (the six Pettit brothers, all prominent landowners and influential figures in early local government, settled in northwestern New Jersey in the 1740s) or from its status as a "new town".

In 1762, Jonathan Hampton, of Elizabethtown, surveyed the location for a county courthouse and town green at the intersection of a military supply road he built during the French and Indian War and a major north–south artery called the King's Highway (present-day New Jersey Route 94). The construction of the courthouse was completed in 1765 and the village that developed around it became known as Sussex Court House. The county courthouse was the site of a raid by British partisan Lieutenant James Moody during the American Revolution.

In 1797, the village's post office was renamed Newtown and later, in 1825, the spelling was altered to Newton. Newton Township would cede land to create new townships on several occasions in the eighteenth and nineteenth-centuries, until a final division dissolved the township on April 11, 1864, through a legislative act of New Jersey Legislature that created the village of Newton as an incorporated town and two rural townships—Hampton and Andover.

== Historic district ==
- Newton Town Plot Historic District
- U.S. National Register of Historic Places
- U.S. Historic district
- New Jersey Register of Historic Places
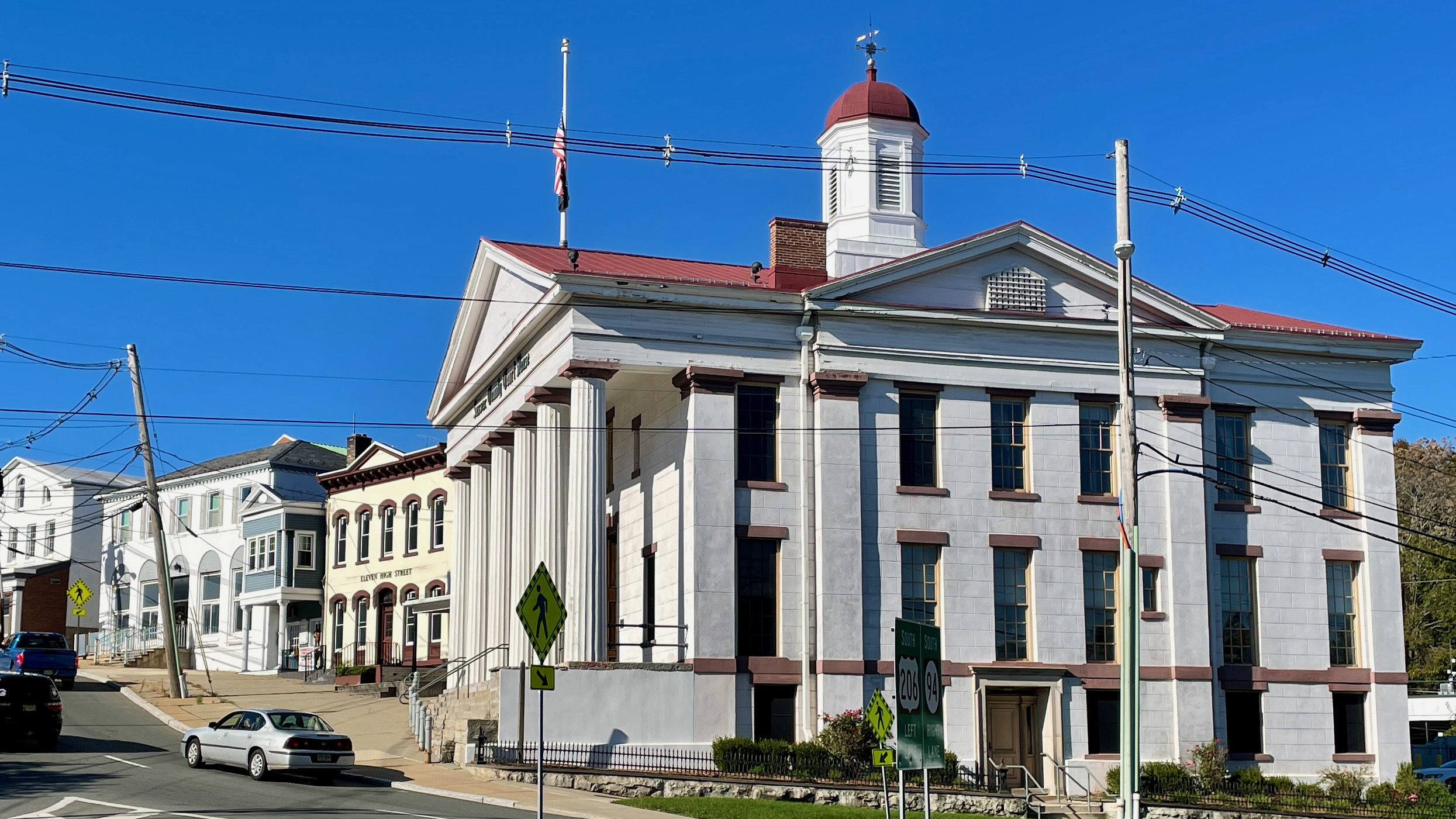
- Sussex County Courthouse on High Street
- Location: Church, High, Main, Moran, and Spring Streets; Park Place
- Area: 17 acres (6.9 ha)
- Built: 1762
- Architectural style: Late 19th And Early 20th Century American Movements, Late 19th And 20th Century Revivals, Late Victorian
- NRHP reference No.: 92001521
- NJRHP No.: 2615

Significant dates
- Added to NRHP: November 12, 1992
- Designated NJRHP: September 24, 1992

The Newton Town Plot Historic District is a 17-acre (6.9 ha) historic district encompassing the Town Plot section of Newton, along Church, High, Main, Moran, and Spring Streets; and Park Place. It was added to the National Register of Historic Places on November 12, 1992, for its significance in architecture, commerce, community planning, settlement, and politics from 1762 to 1941. The district includes 51 contributing buildings, three contributing objects, and two contributing sites. It includes the Sussex County Courthouse, which was added individually to the NRHP in 1979 and the Hill Memorial, added in 1985. The Sussex and Merchants National Bank was built in 1927 with Georgian Revival style and some Beaux Arts ornamentation. The Old Newton Burial Ground, established 1762, is a contributing site. It features a bas relief of Father Time on the cast-iron entrance gates.

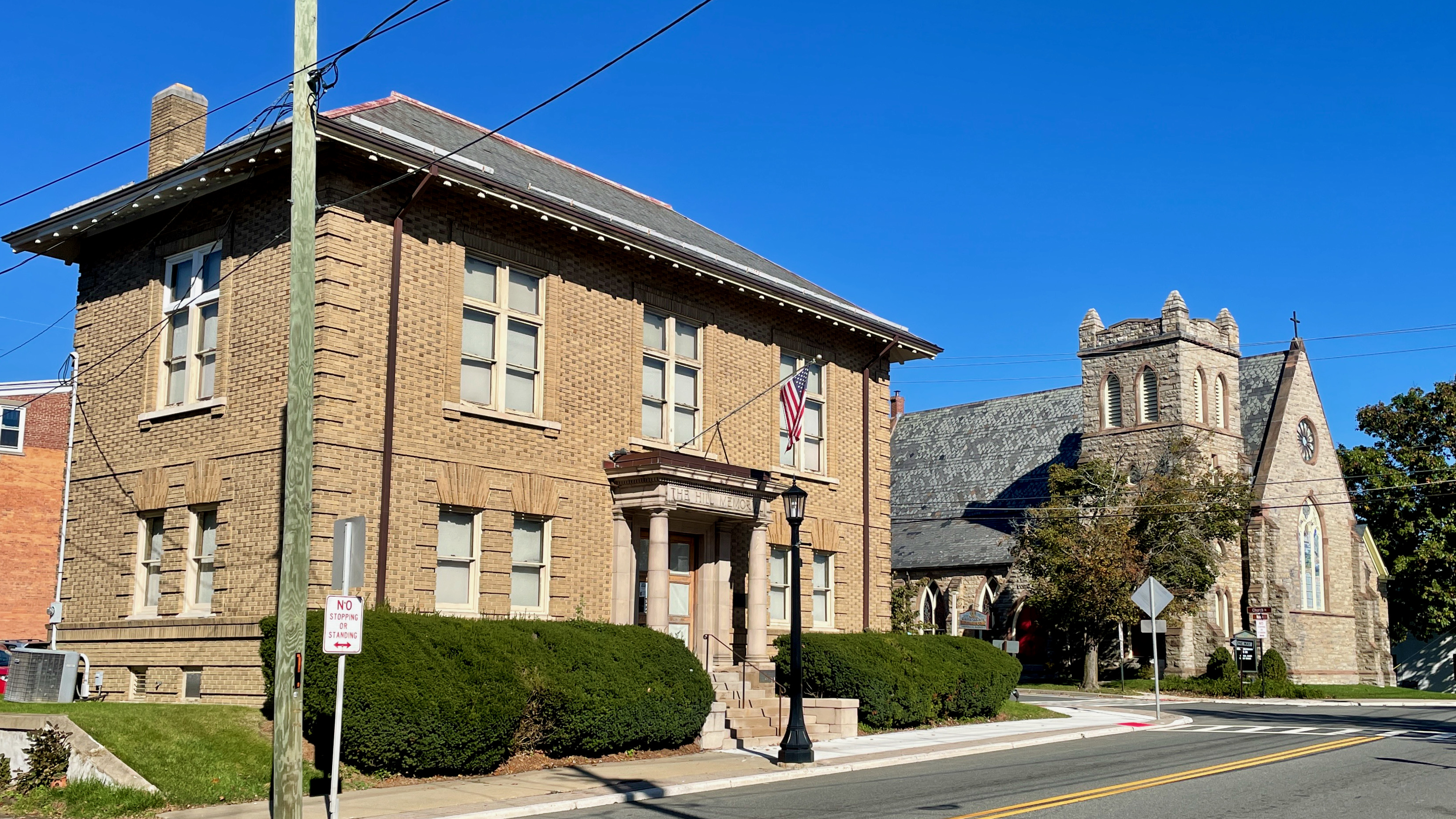
Hill Memorial and Christ Church

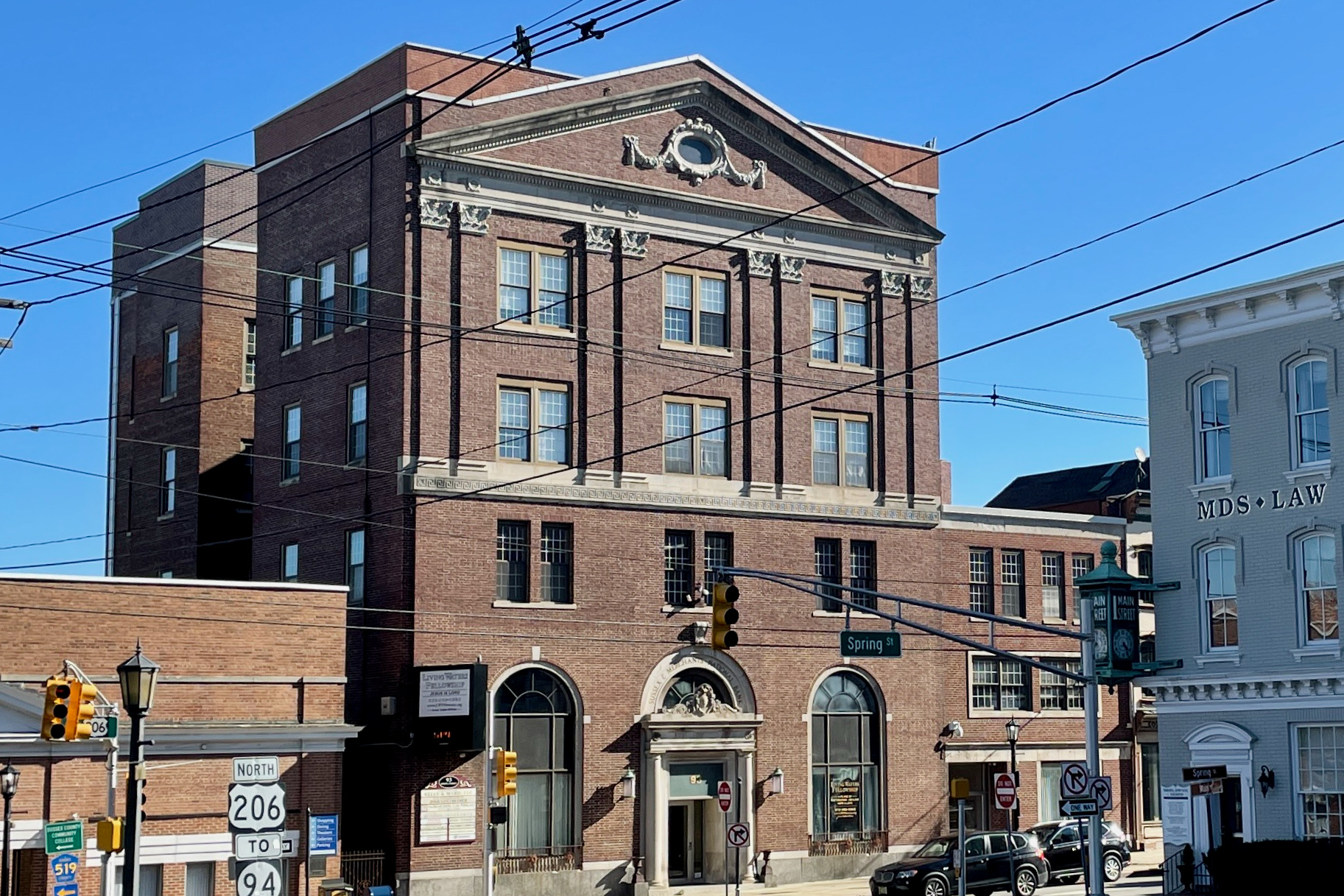
Former Sussex and Merchants National Bank

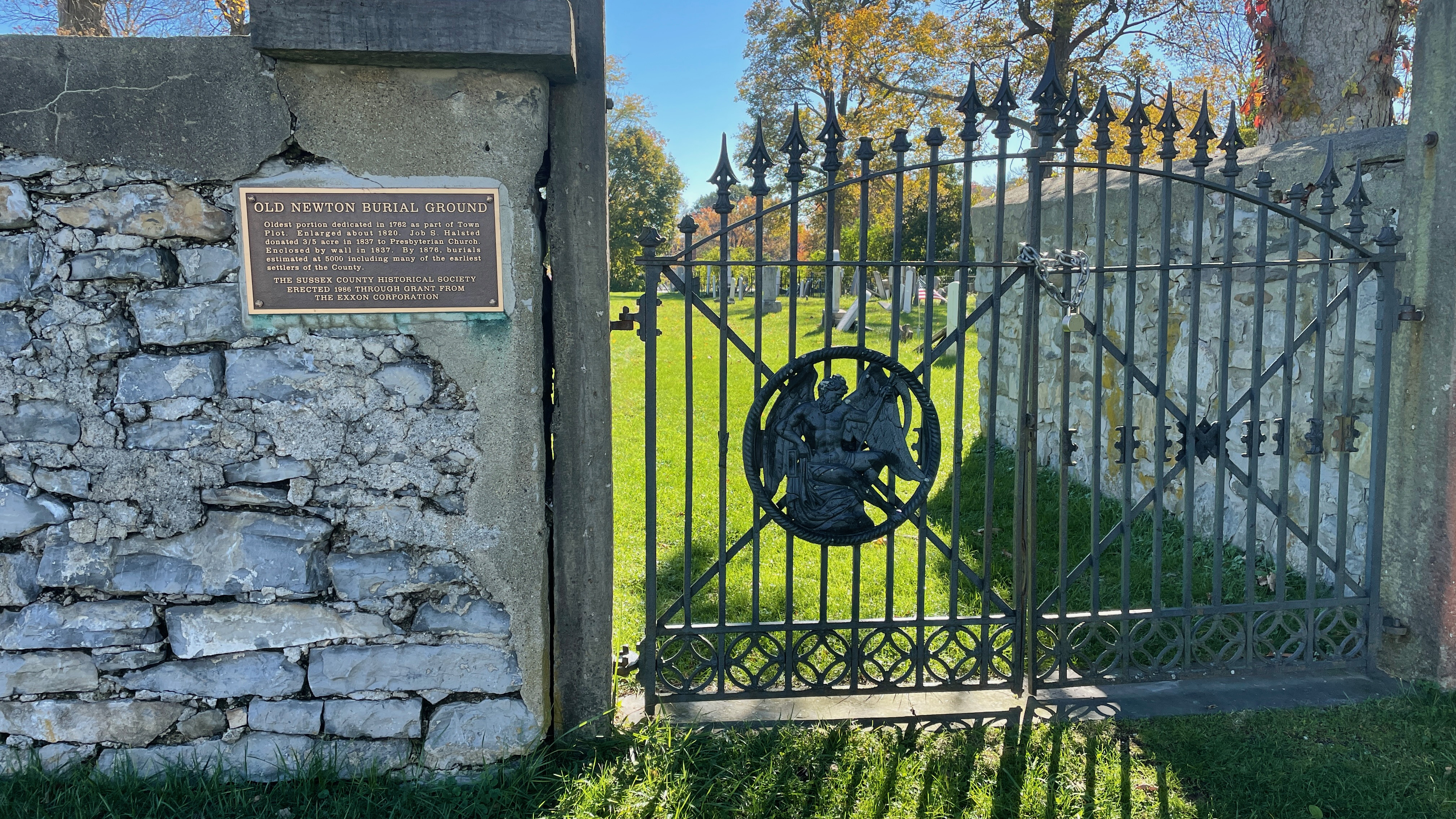
Old Newton Burial Ground entrance gates

== Geography ==
=== Geological features ===
Newton is located in the Kittatinny Valley, a segment of the Great Appalachian Valley. The Great Appalachian Valley is a gigantic trough—a 1,200-mile-long (1,900-kilometer) chain of valley lowlands that stretches about from Quebec to Alabama and is the easternmost edge of Ridge and Valley Appalachians physiographic province. This physiographic province, one of five in New Jersey, occupies approximately two-thirds of the county's area (the county's western and central sections) dominated by Kittatinny Mountain and the Kittatinny Valley. This province's contour is characterized by long, even ridges with long, continuous valleys in between that generally run parallel from southwest to northeast. The features of the Ridge and Valley province were created approximately 300–400 million years ago during the Ordovician period and Appalachian orogeny—a period of tremendous pressure and rock thrusting that caused the creation of the Appalachian Mountains. This region is largely formed by sedimentary rock.

Newton's land area drains into the watersheds of the Paulins Kill and Pequest River—two rivers that are tributaries of the Delaware River. These watersheds are separated by slate ridges that are part of the Martinsburg Formation. These slate ridges were quarried for slate for roofs and other industrial purposes beginning with a quarry opened by Elijah Blackwell in 1859 that operated under a series of different owners and commercial entities until 1930.

=== Political geography ===
According to the United States Census Bureau, the town had a total area of 3.38 square miles (8.8 km^{2}), including 3.36 square miles (8.7 km^{2}) of land and 0.02 square miles (0.052 km^{2}) of water (0.65%).

The Town of Newton is bordered to the north and east by Hampton Township, to the west by Fredon Township, and to the south by Andover Township.

=== Climate and weather ===
Because of its location in the higher elevations of northwestern New Jersey's Appalachian mountains, Newton, as well as the rest of Sussex County, has a cooler humid continental climate or microthermal climate (Köppen climate classification Dfb) which indicates patterns of significant precipitation in all seasons and at least four months where the average temperature rises above 10 °C (50 °F) This differs from the rest of the state which is generally a humid mesothermal climate, in which temperatures range between −3 and 18 °C (27 and 64 °F) during the year's coldest month. Sussex County is part of USDA Plant Hardiness Zone 6.

During winter and early spring, New Jersey in some years is subject to "nor'easters"—significant storm systems that have proven capable of causing blizzards or flooding throughout the northeastern United States. Hurricanes and tropical storms, tornadoes, and earthquakes are relatively rare. The Kittatinny Valley to the north of Newton, part of the Great Appalachian Valley, experiences a snowbelt phenomenon and has been categorized as a microclimate region known as the "Sussex County Snow Belt." This region receives approximately 40 to 50 inches (1,000 to 1,300 mm) of snow per year and generally more snowfall that the rest of Northern New Jersey and the Northern Climate Zone. This phenomenon is attributed to the orographic lift of the Kittatinny Ridge which impacts local weather patterns by increasing humidity and precipitation.

In recent years, average temperatures in the county seat of Newton have ranged from a low of 17 °F (−8 °C) in January to a high of 84 °F (29 °C) in July. Average monthly precipitation ranged from 2.86 inches (73 mm) in February to 4.76 inches (121 mm) in June.

According to the USDA Natural Resource Conservation Service soil survey, the area receives sunshine approximately 62% of the time in summer and 48% in winter. Prevailing winds are typically from the southwest for most of year; but in late winter and early spring come from the northwest. The lowest recorded temperature was −26 °F on January 21, 1994. The highest recorded temperature was 104 °F (40 °C) on September 3, 1953. The heaviest one-day snowfall was 24 inches (610 mm) recorded on January 8, 1996 (combined with the next day, total snowfall was 40 inches). The heaviest one-day rainfall—6.70 inches (170 mm)— was recorded on August 19, 1955.

== Demographics ==
Historical population
Census	Pop.	Note	%±
1860	1,824		—
1870	2,403		31.7%
1880	2,513		4.6%
1890	3,003		19.5%
1900	4,376		45.7%
1910	4,467		2.1%
1920	4,125		−7.7%
1930	5,401		30.9%
1940	5,533		2.4%
1950	5,781		4.5%
1960	6,563		13.5%
1970	7,297		11.2%
1980	7,748		6.2%
1990	7,521		−2.9%
2000	8,244		9.6%
2010	7,997		−3.0%
2020	8,374		4.7%
2023 (est.)	8,240	▼	−1.6%
Population sources: 1860 1870–1920; 1870 1880–1890; 1890–1910 1910–1930; 1940–2000 2000; 2010 2020

=== 2020 census ===
As of the 2020 census, Newton had a population of 8,374. The median age was 42.7 years. 19.6% of residents were under the age of 18 and 20.2% of residents were 65 years of age or older. For every 100 females there were 88.6 males, and for every 100 females age 18 and over there were 85.1 males age 18 and over.

99.6% of residents lived in urban areas, while 0.4% lived in rural areas.

There were 3,400 households in Newton, of which 27.1% had children under the age of 18 living in them. Of all households, 37.1% were married-couple households, 20.1% were households with a male householder and no spouse or partner present, and 34.8% were households with a female householder and no spouse or partner present. About 36.5% of all households were made up of individuals and 17.2% had someone living alone who was 65 years of age or older.

There were 3,687 housing units, of which 7.8% were vacant. The homeowner vacancy rate was 2.1% and the rental vacancy rate was 6.9%.

Racial composition as of the 2020 census
Race	Number	Percent
White	6,201	74.1%
Black or African American	450	5.4%
American Indian and Alaska Native	41	0.5%
Asian	294	3.5%
Native Hawaiian and Other Pacific Islander	0	0.0%
Some other race	527	6.3%
Two or more races	861	10.3%
Hispanic or Latino (of any race)	1,363	16.3%

=== 2010 census ===
The 2010 United States census counted 7,997 people, 3,170 households, and 1,842 families in the town. The population density was 2,542.2 per square mile (981.5/km^{2}). There were 3,479 housing units at an average density of 1,106.0 per square mile (427.0/km^{2}). The racial makeup was 85.04% (6,801) White, 4.88% (390) Black or African American, 0.49% (39) Native American, 2.98% (238) Asian, 0.05% (4) Pacific Islander, 4.34% (347) from other races, and 2.23% (178) from two or more races. Hispanic or Latino of any race were 12.34% (987) of the population.

Of the 3,170 households, 27.2% had children under the age of 18; 40.1% were married couples living together; 13.7% had a female householder with no husband present and 41.9% were non-families. Of all households, 36.1% were made up of individuals and 16.8% had someone living alone who was 65 years of age or older. The average household size was 2.34 and the average family size was 3.06.

21.2% of the population were under the age of 18, 8.7% from 18 to 24, 24.7% from 25 to 44, 26.8% from 45 to 64, and 18.5% who were 65 years of age or older. The median age was 41.9 years. For every 100 females, the population had 91.5 males. For every 100 females ages 18 and older there were 87.6 males.

The Census Bureau's 2006–2010 American Community Survey showed that (in 2010 inflation-adjusted dollars) median household income was $48,702 (with a margin of error of ± $7,922) and the median family income was $72,266 (± $10,712). Males had a median income of $57,369 (± $5,859) versus $29,676 (± $3,910) for females. The per capita income for the borough was $25,296 (± $2,141). About 10.9% of families and 12.8% of the population were below the poverty line, including 21.2% of those under age 18 and 16.6% of those age 65 or over.

=== 2000 census ===
As of the 2000 United States census there were 8,244 people, 3,258 households, and 1,941 families residing in the town. The population density was 2,661.7 inhabitants per square mile (1,027.7/km^{2}). There were 3,425 housing units at an average density of 1,105.8 per square mile (427.0/km^{2}). The racial makeup of the town was 91.97% White, 2.80% African American, 0.13% Native American, 1.97% Asian, 0.01% Pacific Islander, 1.16% from other races, and 1.35% from two or more races. Hispanic or Latino of any race were 3.80% of the population.

There were 3,258 households, out of which 30.1% had children under the age of 18 living with them, 44.0% were married couples living together, 11.5% had a female householder with no husband present, and 40.4% were non-families. 33.5% of all households were made up of individuals, and 14.5% had someone living alone who was 65 years of age or older. The average household size was 2.39 and the average family size was 3.12.

In the town, the population was spread out, with 23.9% under the age of 18, 7.6% from 18 to 24, 31.2% from 25 to 44, 21.6% from 45 to 64, and 15.6% who were 65 years of age or older. The median age was 38 years. For every 100 females, there were 92 males. For every 100 females age 18 and over, there were 90.5 males.

The median income for a household in the town was $44,667, and the median income for a family was $56,484. Males had a median income of $41,089 versus $30,016 for females. The per capita income for the town was $20,577. About 6.9% of families and 11.2% of the population were below the poverty line, including 11.4% of those under age 18 and 11% of those age 65 or over.

== Arts and culture ==
=== Museums, galleries, and libraries ===
Newton is home to the Sussex County Historical Society's Hill Memorial Museum, the oldest continuously operating museum building in the state. The society, founded in 1904, offers a research and genealogical collection, and displays focused on the region's history, from Mastodon bones and Native American artifacts and from the Revolutionary War to World War II.

- Newton Fire Museum on Spring Street
- Sussex County Arts & Heritage Council operates a gallery on Spring Street.
- Dennis Library, founded as a private library association in the mid-19th century, now part of the Sussex County Library System.

=== Performing arts ===
The Newton Theatre is a former Reilly and Hall movie theater originally constructed in 1924 that has been converted into a 605-seat performing arts center.

Drama Geek Studios is a non-profit community theatre group, based in Newton, NJ by the Newton Theatre. They offer classes, workshops, and performances to people of all ages in Sussex County.

=== Religion ===
Newton's community offers a range of Christian houses of worship and one Jewish synagogue. These include:

- Christ Church, founded in 1769, an Episcopal parish within the Episcopal Diocese of Newark
- First Presbyterian Church of Newton, founded in 1786, and affiliated with the PCUSA.
- The First United Methodist Church
- Covenant Reformed Church
- First Baptist Church of Newton, established in nearby Augusta in the 1750s, moved to Newton in 1810.
- St. Joseph's Roman Catholic Church, a parish of the Roman Catholic Diocese of Paterson.
- Temple B'Nai Shalom, a Jewish synagogue and headquarters of Drama Geek Studios.
- Christ Community Church of the Christian Missionary Alliance (located in the old train station plaza)
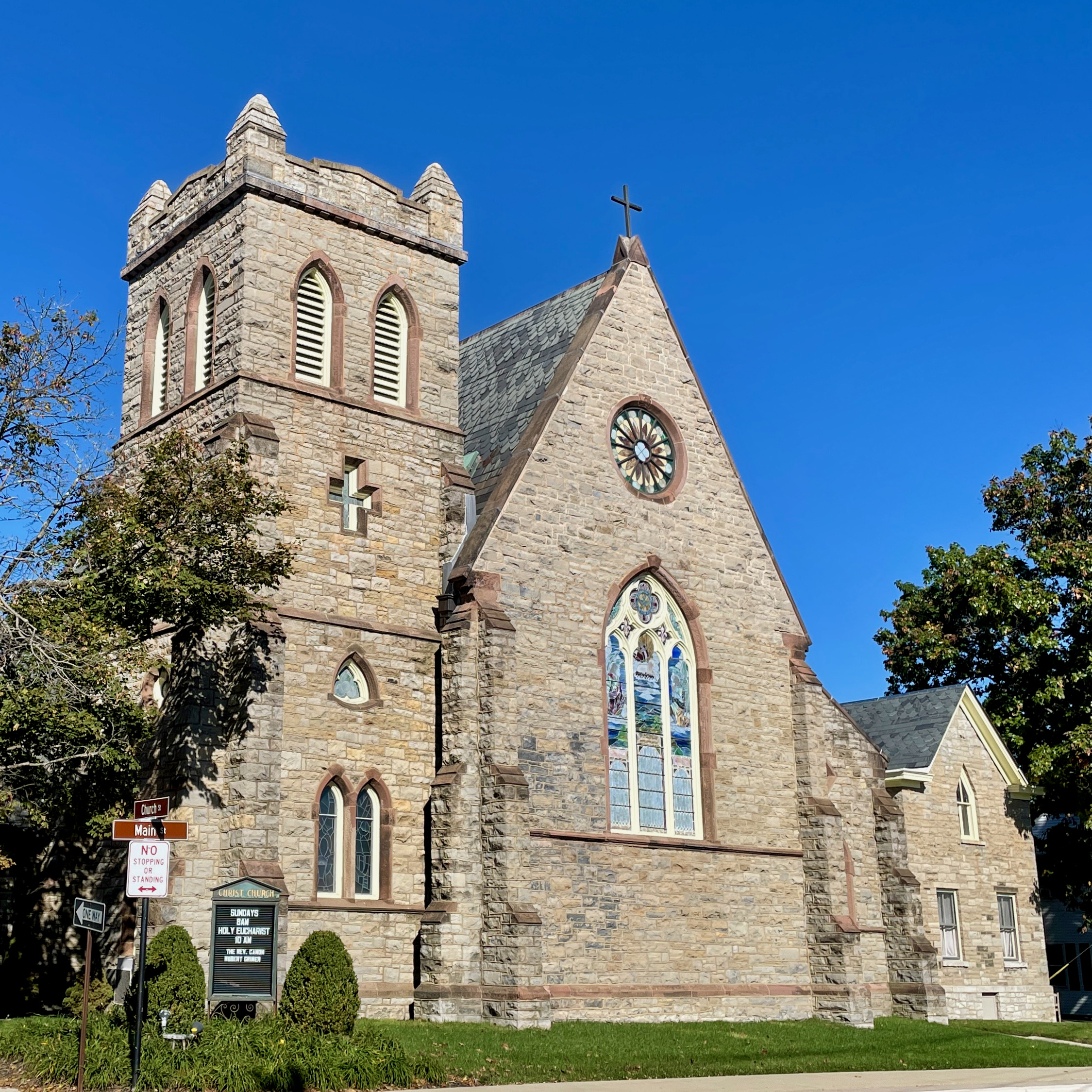
Christ Church

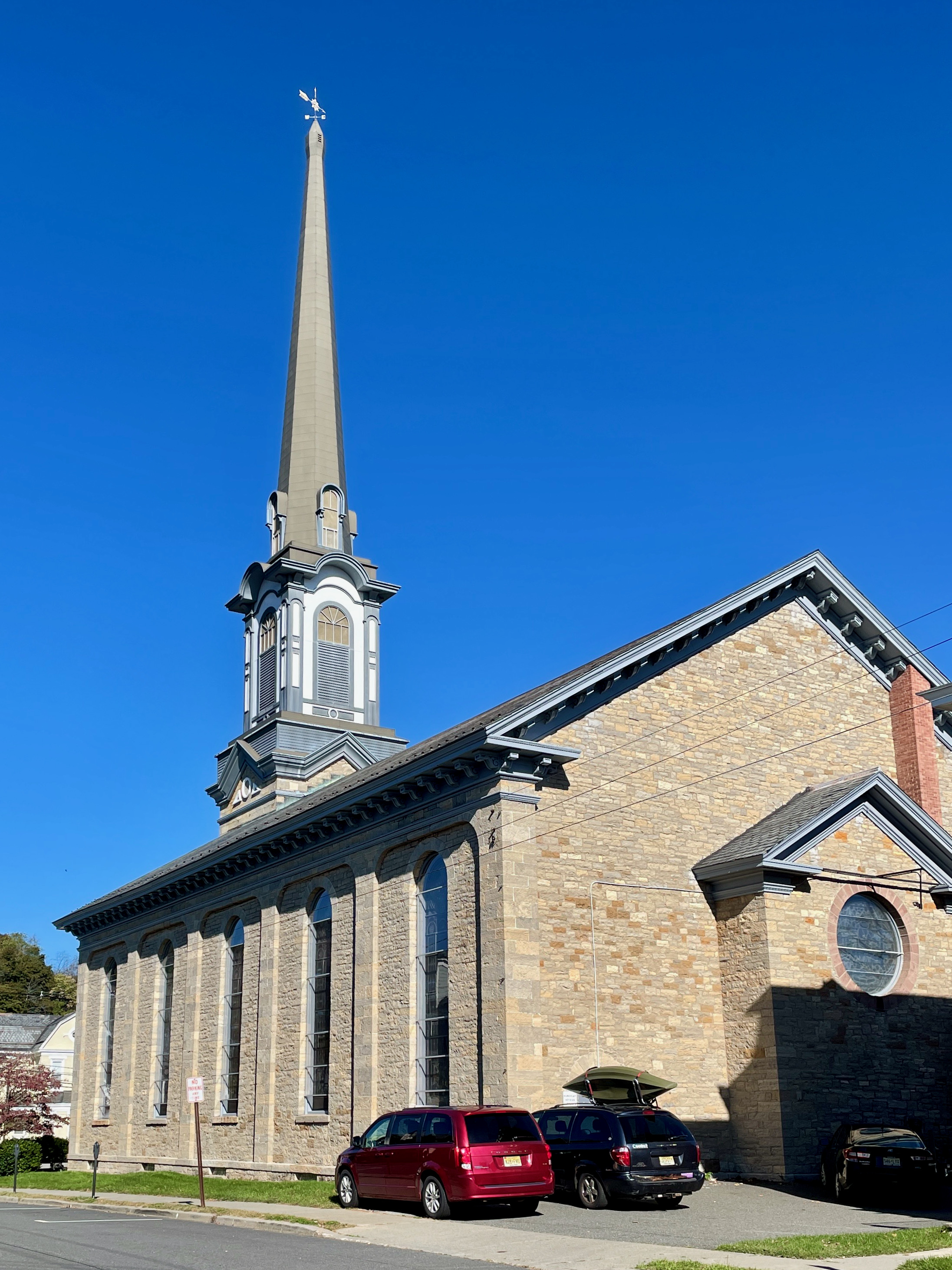
First Presbyterian Church

== Sports ==
Skylands Park in nearby Frankford Township, is the home of the Sussex County Miners, who play in the Frontier League.

== Parks and recreation ==
- Memory Park, established with 10 acres (4.0 ha) of land donated by Newman E. Drake in 1928.
- Pine Street Park, a small park located at the end of a residential street that hosts youth soccer games and has a playground.
- Newton Square, a green area in the center of town that can be booked out for rallies and events and is owned by Sussex County.

== Government ==
=== Local government ===
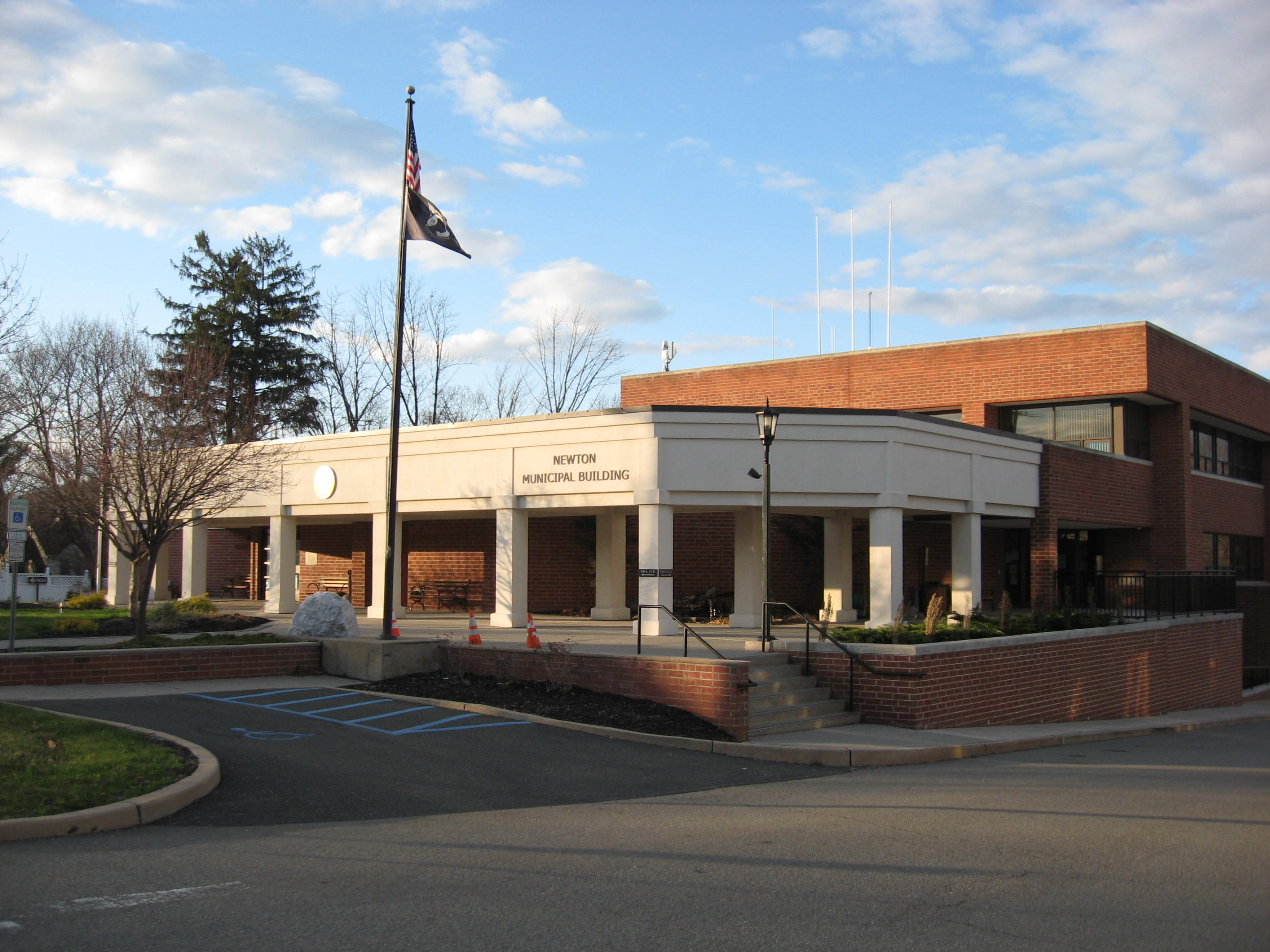
Newton's municipal building, located on Trinity Street, houses the town's offices, municipal court, and police department.

Newton operates under the Council-Manager form of municipal government (Plan B), in accordance with the Faulkner Act, formally known as the Optional Municipal Charter Law, as one of 42 municipalities (of the 564) in the state to use this form. This form of government was implemented based on the recommendations of a Charter Study Commission as of July 1, 1978. The town's governing board is comprised of a five-member Town Council, whose members are chosen at-large in non-partisan elections to four-year terms of office on a staggered basis, with either two or three seats coming up for election in November of even-numbered years in alternating fashion. The council selects a mayor and deputy mayor from among its members to serve one-year terms of office, at a reorganization meeting held annually in January.

After voters passed a referendum in 2018, the town's municipal elections were shifted from May to November.

As of 2024, members of the Town Council are Mayor John-Paul E. Couce (term on council and as mayor ends December 31, 2024), Deputy Mayor Helen R. Le Frois (term on council ends 2026; term as deputy mayor ends 2024), Matthew S. Dickson (2026), Sandra Lee Diglio (2026) and Michelle J. Teets (2024).

=== Federal, state and county representation ===
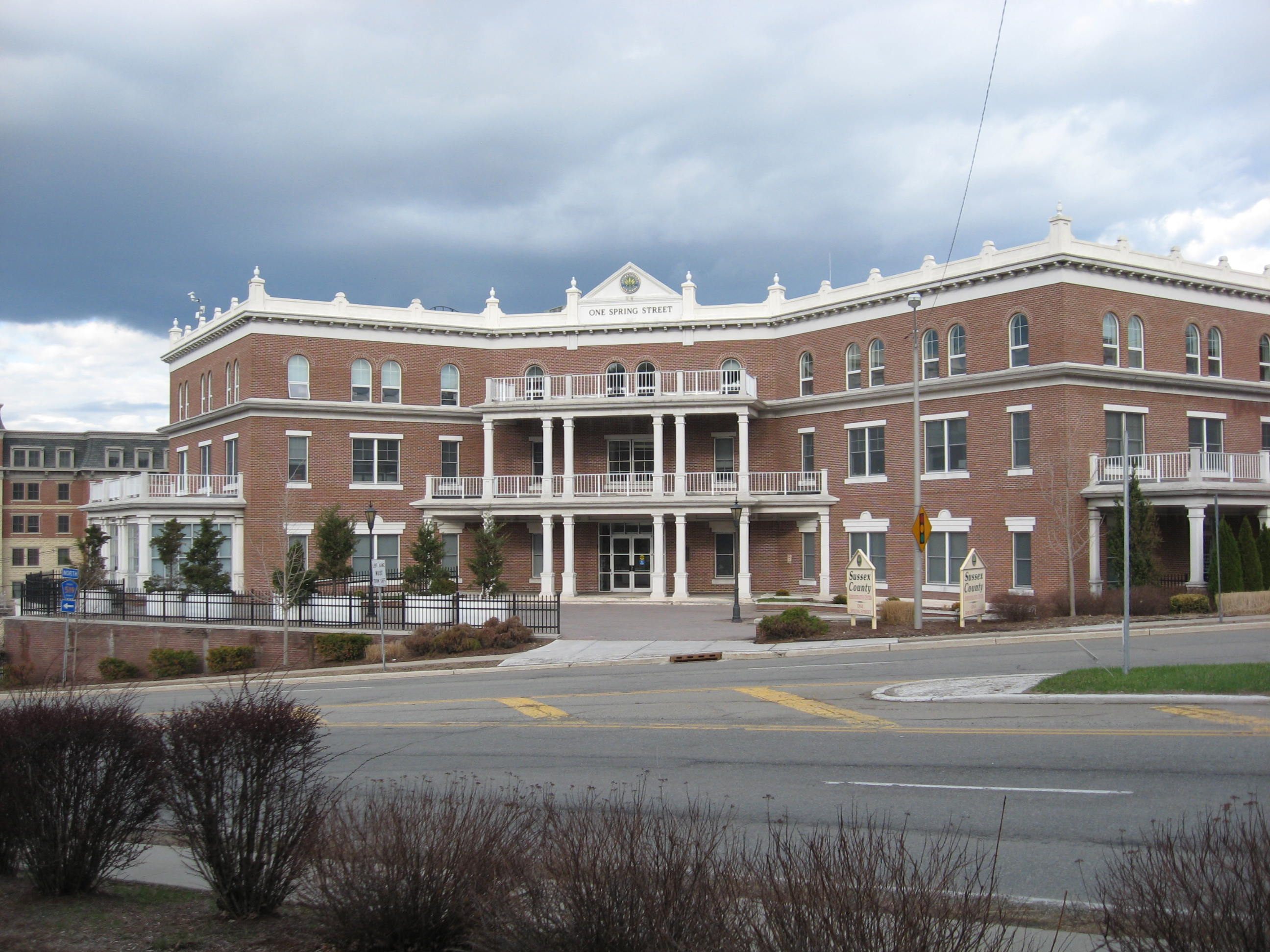
The administrative offices for the County of Sussex are located in the center of Newton at One Spring Street.

Since 1762, Newton has been the county seat of Sussex County. It is the location of the county's administrative offices, court facilities, and county jail. The town is located in the 5th Congressional District and is part of New Jersey's 24th state legislative district.

For the 119th United States Congress, New Jersey's 5th congressional district is represented by Josh Gottheimer (D, Wyckoff). New Jersey is represented in the United States Senate by Democrats Cory Booker (Newark, term ends 2027) and Andy Kim (Moorestown, term ends 2031).

For the 2026–2027 session, the 24th legislative district of the New Jersey Legislature is represented in the State Senate by Parker Space (R, Wantage Township) and in the General Assembly by Dawn Fantasia (R, Franklin) and Mike Inganamort (R, Chester Township).

Sussex County is governed by a Board of County Commissioners whose five members are elected at-large in partisan elections on a staggered basis, with either one or two seats coming up for election each year. At an annual reorganization meeting held in the beginning of January, the board selects a Commissioner Director and Deputy Director from among its members, with day-to-day supervision of the operation of the county delegated to a County Administrator. As of 2025, Sussex County's Commissioners are Director Jill Space (R, Wantage Township, 2025), Deputy Director Chris Carney (R, Frankford Township, 2027), Jack DeGroot (R, Sussex, 2026), William Hayden (I, Branchville, 2025) and Alan Henderson (R, Lafayette Township, 2027).

Constitutional officers elected on a countywide basis are Clerk Jeffrey M. Parrott (R, Wantage Township, 2026), Sheriff Michael F. Strada (R, Hampton Township, 2025) and Surrogate Gary R. Chiusano (R, Frankford Township, 2028).

=== Politics ===
As of March 2011, there were a total of 4,476 registered voters in Newton, of which 881 (19.7% vs. 16.5% countywide) were registered as Democrats, 1,537 (34.3% vs. 39.3%) were registered as Republicans and 2,052 (45.8% vs. 44.1%) were registered as Unaffiliated. There were 6 voters registered as Libertarians or Greens. Among the town's 2010 Census population, 56.0% (vs. 65.8% in Sussex County) were registered to vote, including 71.0% of those ages 18 and over (vs. 86.5% countywide).

Gubernatorial election results for Newton
Year	Republican		Democratic		Third party(ies)	
Year	No.	%	No.	%	No.	%
2025	1,306	47.35%	1,427	51.74%	25	0.91%
2021	1,210	56.54%	892	41.68%	38	1.78%
2017	960	51.47%	809	43.38%	96	5.15%
2013	1,210	67.26%	531	29.52%	58	3.22%
2009	1,161	57.53%	620	30.72%	237	11.74%
2005	1,017	54.07%	760	40.40%	104	5.53%

In the 2012 presidential election, Republican Mitt Romney received 1,546 votes (50.9% vs. 59.4% countywide), ahead of Democrat Barack Obama with 1,395 votes (45.9% vs. 38.2%) and other candidates with 87 votes (2.9% vs. 2.1%), among the 3,038 ballots cast by the town's 4,645 registered voters, for a turnout of 65.4% (vs. 68.3% in Sussex County). In the 2008 presidential election, Republican John McCain received 1,747 votes (54.8% vs. 59.2% countywide), ahead of Democrat Barack Obama with 1,359 votes (42.6% vs. 38.7%) and other candidates with 62 votes (1.9% vs. 1.5%), among the 3,189 ballots cast by the town's 4,418 registered voters, for a turnout of 72.2% (vs. 76.9% in Sussex County). In the 2004 presidential election, Republican George W. Bush received 1,903 votes (59.6% vs. 63.9% countywide), ahead of Democrat John Kerry with 1,220 votes (38.2% vs. 34.4%) and other candidates with 54 votes (1.7% vs. 1.3%), among the 3,191 ballots cast by the town's 4,359 registered voters, for a turnout of 73.2% (vs. 77.7% in the whole county).

United States presidential election results for Newton 2024 2020 2016 2012 2008 2004
Year	Republican		Democratic		Third party(ies)	
Year	No.	%	No.	%	No.	%
2024	1,981	52.55%	1,707	45.28%	82	2.18%
2020	1,868	48.98%	1,860	48.77%	86	2.25%
2016	1,658	52.06%	1,352	42.45%	175	5.49%
2012	1,546	51.06%	1,395	46.07%	87	2.87%
2008	1,737	55.00%	1,359	43.03%	62	1.96%
2004	1,903	59.90%	1,220	38.40%	54	1.70%

In the 2013 gubernatorial election, Republican Chris Christie received 67.3% of the vote (1,210 cast), ahead of Democrat Barbara Buono with 29.5% (531 votes), and other candidates with 3.2% (58 votes), among the 1,808 ballots cast by the town's 4,705 registered voters (9 ballots were spoiled), for a turnout of 38.4%. In the 2009 gubernatorial election, Republican Chris Christie received 1,161 votes (57.0% vs. 63.3% countywide), ahead of Democrat Jon Corzine with 620 votes (30.4% vs. 25.7%), Independent Chris Daggett with 203 votes (10.0% vs. 9.1%) and other candidates with 34 votes (1.7% vs. 1.3%), among the 2,037 ballots cast by the town's 4,323 registered voters, yielding a 47.1% turnout (vs. 52.3% in the county).

United States Senate election results for Newton1
Year	Republican		Democratic		Third party(ies)	
Year	No.	%	No.	%	No.	%
2024	1,826	50.01%	1,652	45.25%	173	4.74%
2018	1,361	51.73%	1,093	41.54%	177	6.73%
2012	1,443	49.22%	1,337	45.60%	152	5.18%
2006	1,088	57.96%	715	38.09%	74	3.94%

United States Senate election results for Newton2
Year	Republican		Democratic		Third party(ies)	
Year	No.	%	No.	%	No.	%
2020	1,720	45.93%	1,858	49.61%	167	4.46%
2014	790	52.74%	659	43.99%	49	3.27%
2013	698	57.73%	494	40.86%	17	1.41%
2008	1,591	51.32%	1,355	43.71%	154	4.97%

== Law enforcement and public safety ==
Established in 1910, Newton has a municipal police department, currently under the leadership of its 12th Chief of Police, Steven VanNieuwland, who was appointed in June 2021.

Newton is also home to the Sussex County Sheriff's Office.

A barracks for the New Jersey State Police is located in Augusta, New Jersey, several miles north of Newton.

== Education ==
=== Elementary and secondary schools ===
The Newton Public School District serves students in kindergarten through twelfth grade. The district's enrollment includes high school students from Andover Borough and Andover and Green townships, who attend the high school as part of sending/receiving relationships. As of the 2021–22 school year, the district, comprised of three schools, had an enrollment of 1,586 students and 137.0 classroom teachers (on an FTE basis), for a student–teacher ratio of 11.6:1. Schools in the district (with 2021–22 enrollment data from the National Center for Education Statistics) are Merriam Avenue School with 451 students in grades PreK-4, Halsted Middle School with 331 students in grades 5-8 and Newton High School with 710 students in grades 9–12.

Founded in 1956, the Saint Joseph's Regional School was a private school affiliated with parish of Newton's Saint Joseph's Roman Catholic Church and overseen by the Roman Catholic Diocese of Paterson. St Joseph's provided classes from pre-kindergarten (ages 3–5) to seventh-grade for a total enrollment of 140 students. The school closed in June 2016 and was one of four schools that merged into Reverend George Brown School in Sparta.

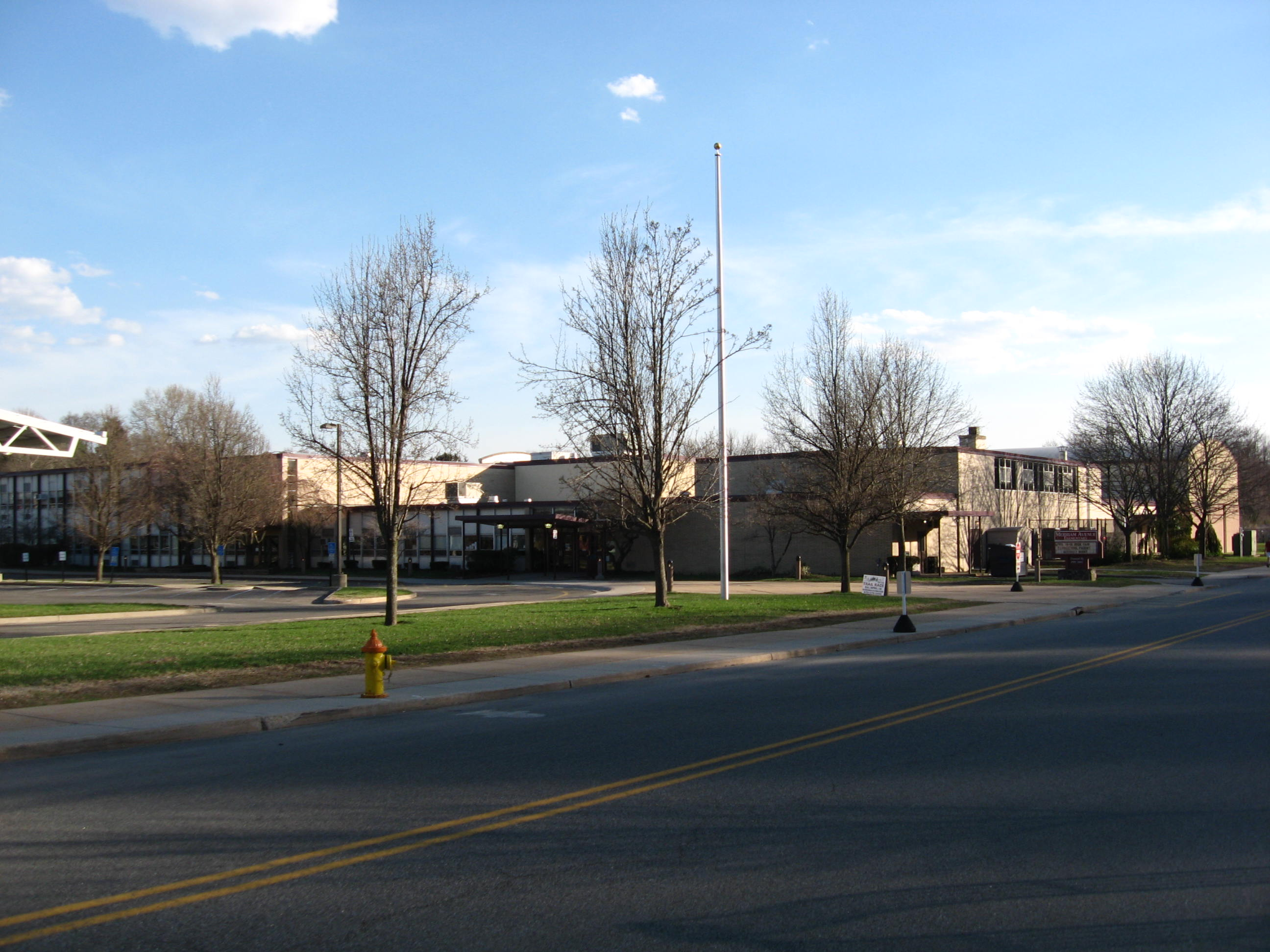
Merriam Avenue Elementary School (Public, Grades K–5)

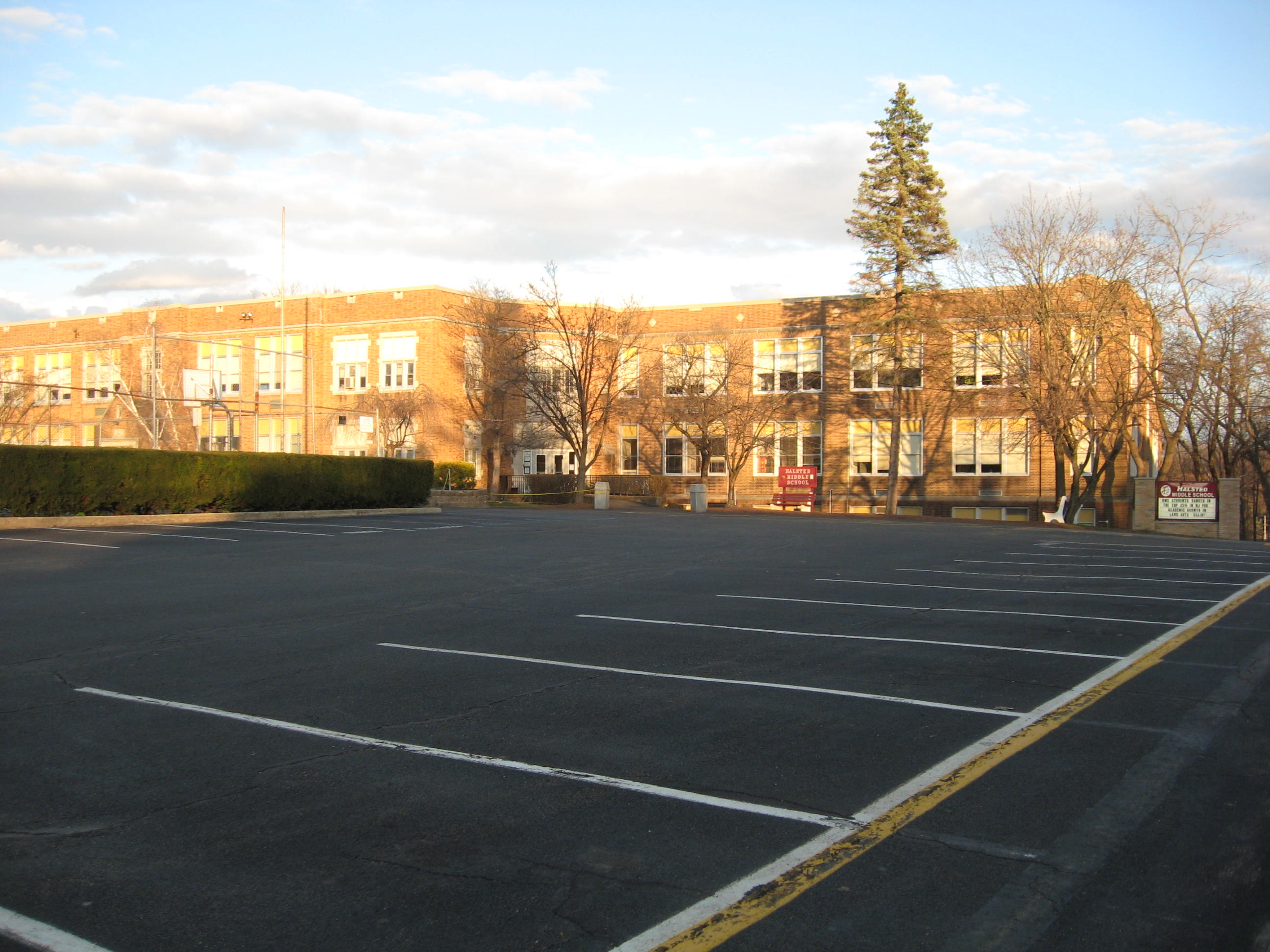
Halsted Street Middle School (Public, Grades 6–8)

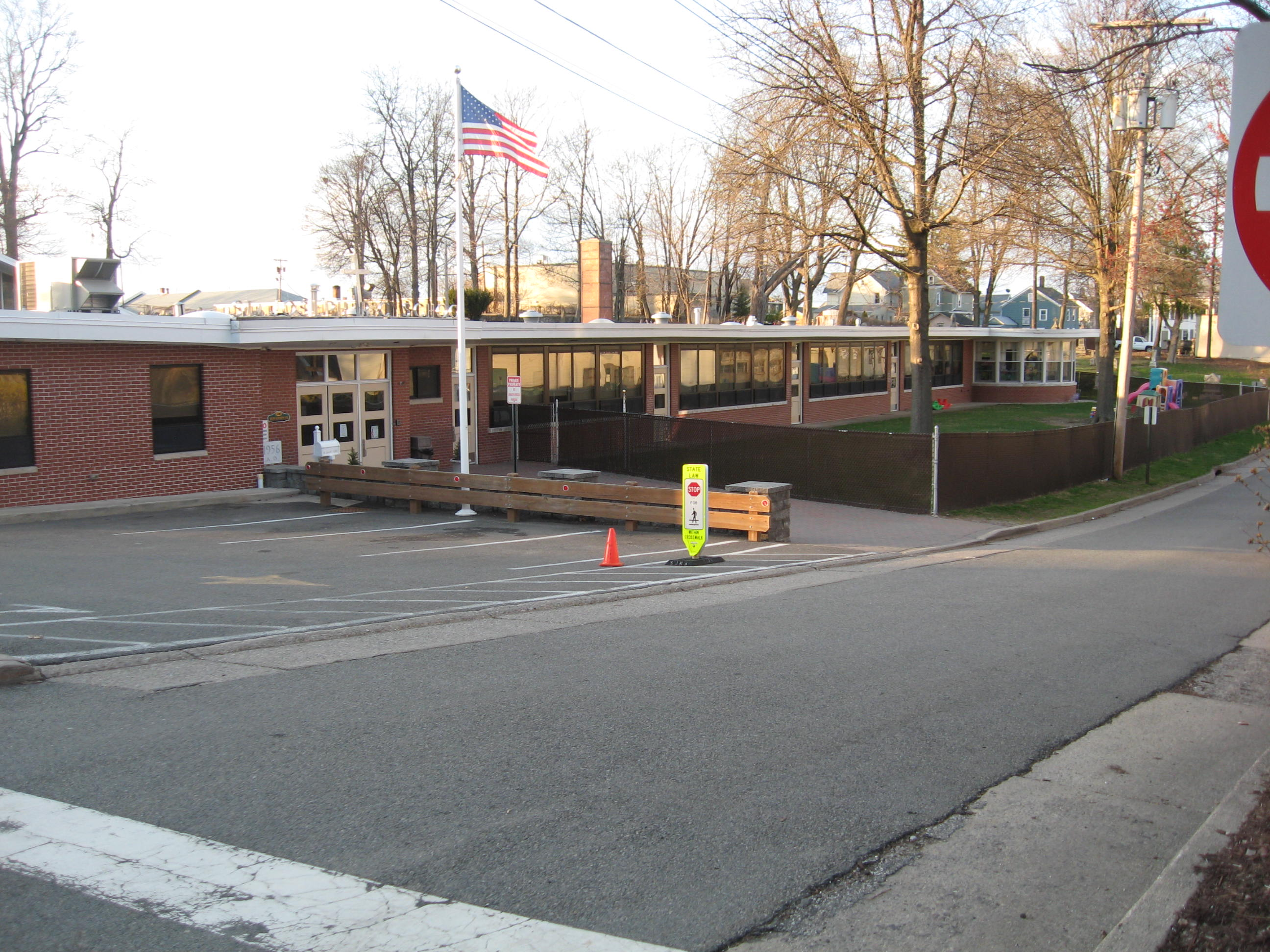
Saint Joseph's Regional School (Private, Pre-K–8)

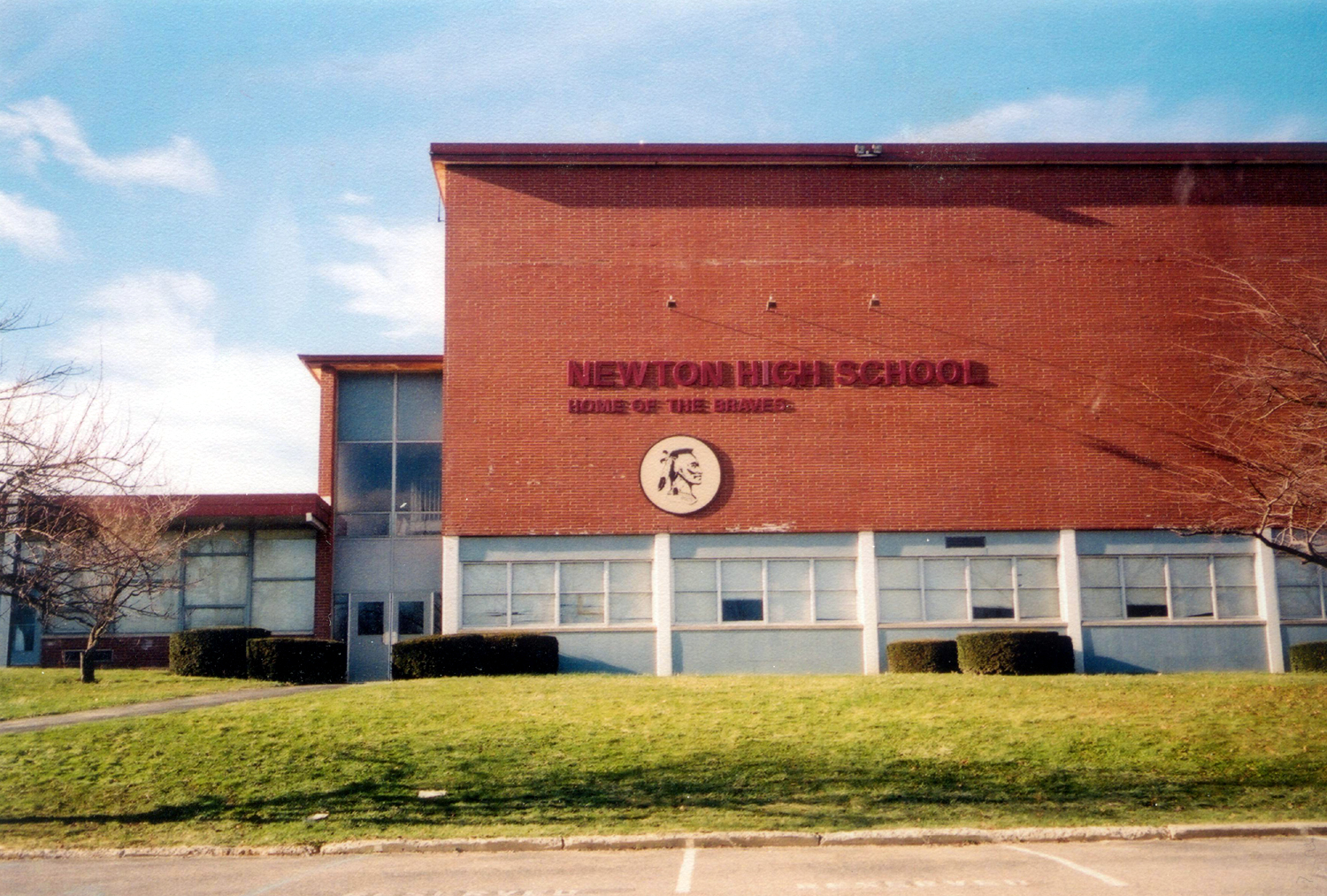
Newton High School (Public, Grades 9–12)

=== Higher education ===
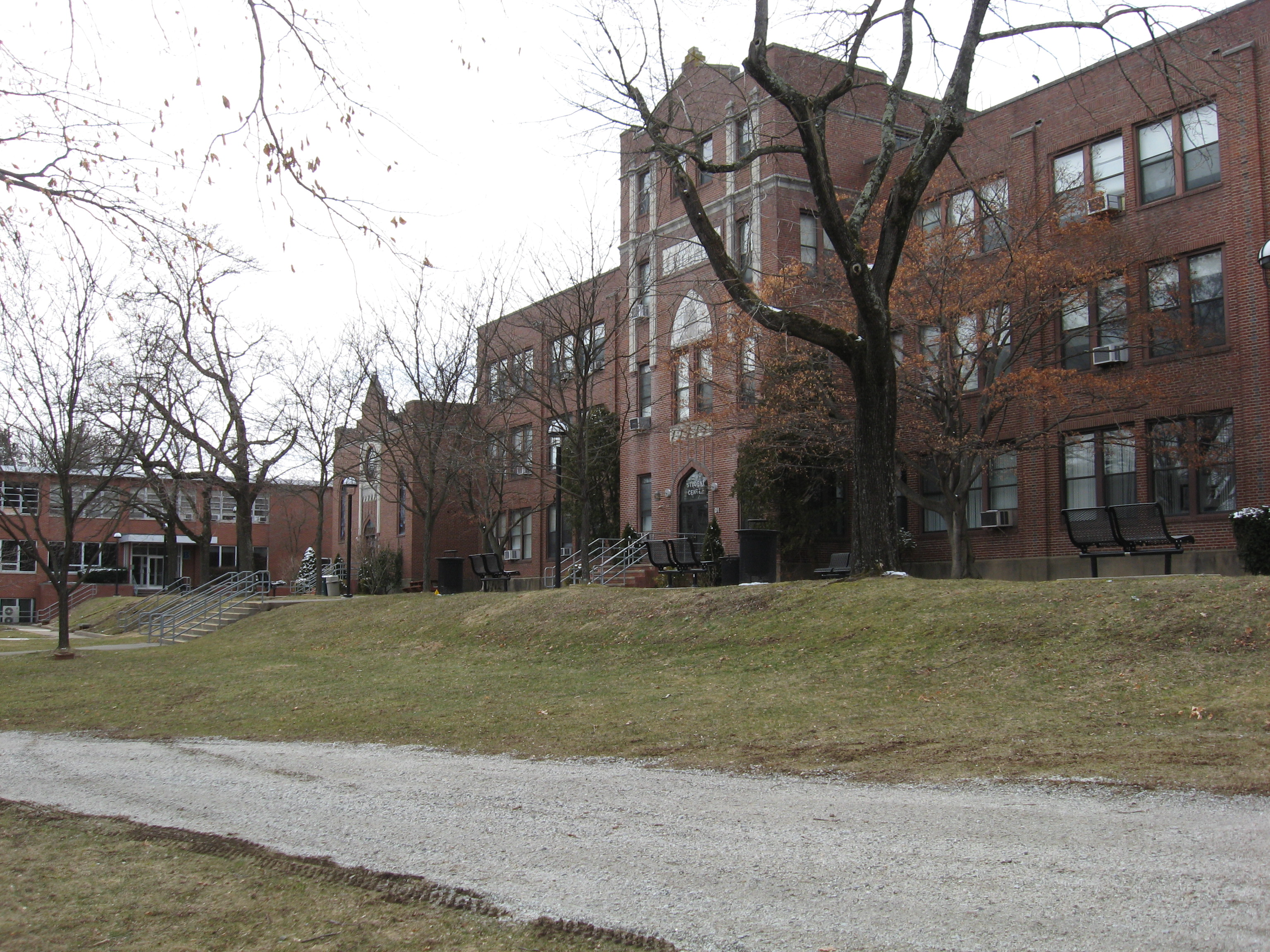
Formerly the campus of Don Bosco College, a Roman Catholic seminary, the county government purchased the school's Newton property in 1989 for the use of Sussex County Community College, founded in 1981.

Sussex County Community College (commonly referred to as SCCC) is an accredited, co-educational, two-year, public, community college located on a 167-acre (68 ha) campus in Newton. The SCCC campus was formerly the site of Don Bosco College, a Roman Catholic seminary operated by the Salesian Order from 1928 until it was closed in the early 1980s and its campus sold to the Sussex County government in June 1989 for $4.2 million.

SCCC was authorized as a "college commission" in 1981 and began operations the following year. It became fully accredited in 1993 by the Commission on Higher Education of the Middle States Association of Colleges and Schools. SCCC offers 40 associate degree and 16 post-secondary professional and health science certificate programs available both at traditional classes at its campus, through hybrid and online classes, and through distance learning. Many students who attend SCCC transfer to pursue the completion of their undergraduate college education at a four-year college or university. The college also offers programs for advanced high school students, community education courses, and programs in cooperation with the New Jersey Department of Labor and Workforce Development. The school had an enrollment of 3,012 students of which half attended full-time and half attended part-time.

== Infrastructure ==
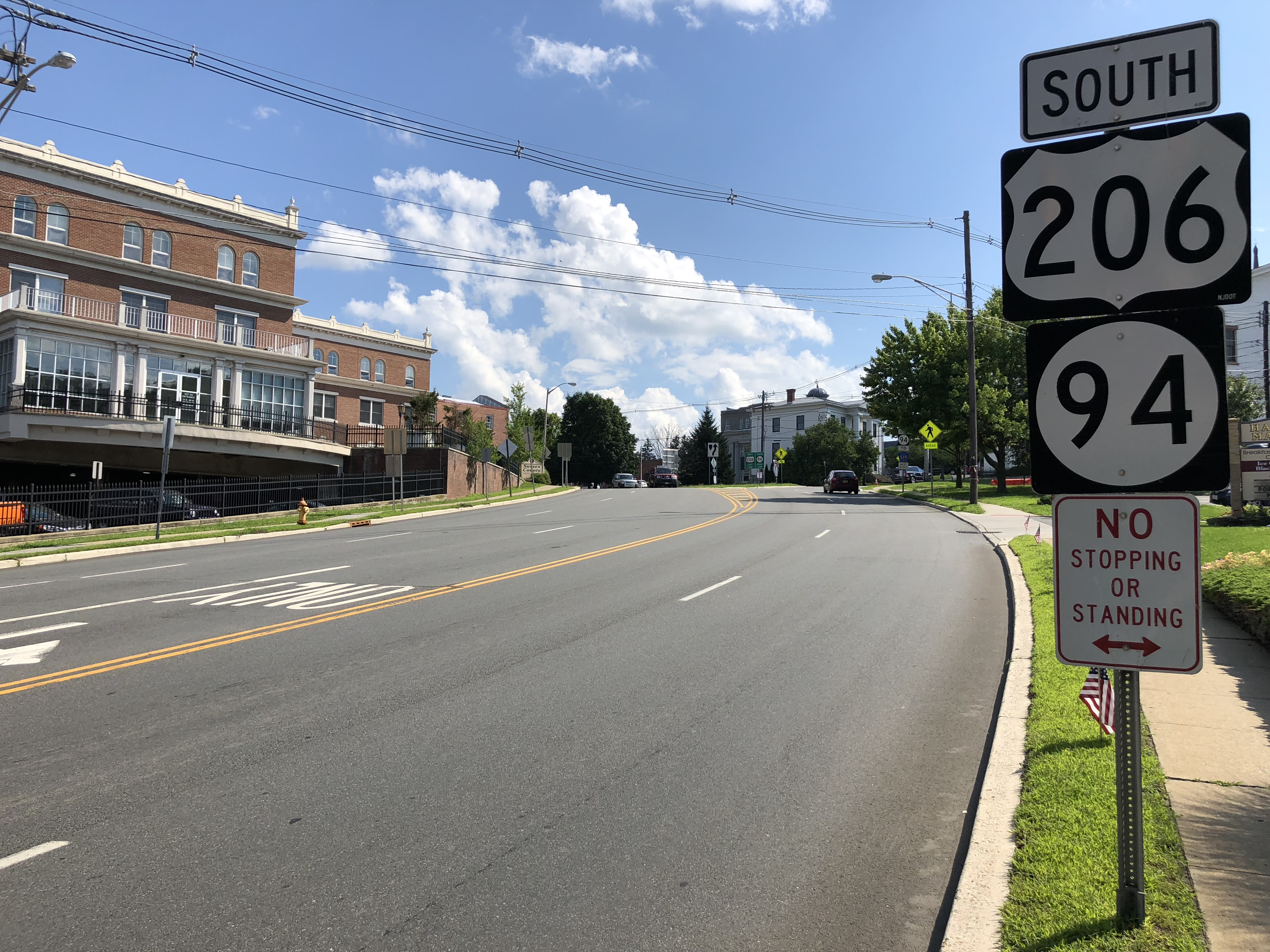
View south along U.S. Route 206, Route 94 and County Route 519 in Newton

=== Roads and highways ===
As of May 2010, the town had a total of 28.75 miles (46.27 km) of roadways, of which 21.18 miles (34.09 km) were maintained by the municipality, 4.47 miles (7.19 km) by Sussex County and 3.10 miles (4.99 km) by the New Jersey Department of Transportation.

Newton is located at the intersection of U.S. Route 206 (known within Newton as Woodside Avenue, Main Street, and Water Street), New Jersey Route 94 (known within Newton as High Street and Water Street), and County Route 519 (known within Newton as West End Avenue and Mill Street) and County Route 616 (known within Newton as Spring Street and Sparta Avenue). Interstate 80 is accessible approximately 13 miles (21 km) to the south.

=== Public transportation ===
The nearest NJ Transit rail station is Netcong, approximately 12 miles (19 km) to the south.

Lakeland Bus Lines provides limited service between Newton and the Port Authority Bus Terminal in Midtown Manhattan.

Local bus service is provided by the Skylands Connect bus, which connects to Sparta, Hamburg, and Sussex.

=== Aviation ===
Newton Airport was a public-use airport located 3 miles (4.8 km) south of the central business district. The airport closed in 2013.

=== Health care ===
Newton Memorial Hospital opened in the early 1930s during the Great Depression. The medical center was established using funds from a willed gift of $35,000 from Thomas Murray (to be specifically used to establish a hospital in Newton) and a $100,000 bequest from Clarence Linn. The hospital "is a short-term, fully accredited, 146-bed acute care, not-for-profit hospital serving more than 250,000 people in Warren and Sussex counties in New Jersey, Pike County in Pennsylvania and southern Orange County in New York." Newton Memorial Hospital was bought by Atlantic Health System and changed its name to Newton Medical Center in 2011.

== Media ==
=== Newspapers ===
Newton is home to the editorial offices of New Jersey Herald, the state's oldest newspaper, founded in 1829.

=== Radio and television ===
The town of Newton has three radio stations within its borders: WNNJ, on 103.7 FM, with a format of Rock, WRSK-LP on 95.7 FM from Sussex County Community College with a format of oldies/big band/country/polka and WTOC (AM), which serves Newton in Spanish at 1360 AM.

WMBC-TV is licensed to Newton, but its studios are in West Caldwell, New Jersey and its transmitter is near Lake Hopatcong.

== Notable people ==
People who were born in, residents of, or otherwise closely associated with Newton include:

- Danny Baugher (born 1984), punter who played in the NFL for the Oakland Raiders
- Susanna Bokoyni (1879–1984), circus performer and oldest living little person on record
- Will Bradley (1912–1989), trombonist
- Johnny Budd (1899–1963), football player in the early NFL for the Frankford Yellow Jackets and the Pottsville Maroons
- Alex Cable, optical engineer, inventor and entrepreneur, who is the founder of optical equipment manufacturer Thorlabs
- Henry J. B. Cummings (1831–1909), member of the United States Congress who represented Iowa's 7th congressional district
- Newman E. Drake (1860–1930), founder of Drake's bakery
- Jeff Fogelson (1947–2018), athletic director at Seton Hall University from 1998 to 2006
- Janeane Garofalo (born 1964), actress and comedian
- John W. Griggs (1849–1927), 27th Governor of New Jersey who later served as United States Attorney General
- Robert Hamilton (1809–1878), represented New Jersey's 4th congressional district in the United States House of Representatives from 1873 to 1877
- James Howard (died 1879), soldier who was awarded the Medal of Honor in 1865 for his actions in the American Civil War
- Ardolph L. Kline (1858–1930), represented Brooklyn in the United States House of Representatives from Brooklyn in 1921–1923 and served in 1913 as acting Mayor of New York City
- Leonard LaRue (1914–2001), captain of the SS Meredith Victory who was involved in the largest humanitarian rescue operation by a single ship in human history
- Bruce Lawrence (born 1941), Professor of Religion at Duke University
- Mary Tuthill Lindheim (1912–2004), sculptor
- Robert H. McCarter (1859–1948), New Jersey Attorney General from 1903 to 1909
- Alison Littell McHose (born 1965), politician who served in the New Jersey General Assembly from 2003 to 2015, where she represented the 24th Legislative District
- Henry W. Merriam (1828–1900), shoe manufacturer
- Andrew Napolitano (born 1950), former New Jersey Superior Court judge, syndicated columnist, and a senior judicial analyst for Fox News. He owns a maple syrup farm in Newton
- Rodman M. Price (1816–1894), represented New Jersey's 5th congressional district in the United States House of Representatives from 1851 to 1853, and served as the 17th Governor of New Jersey, from 1854 to 1857
- Andrew J. Rogers (1828–1900), represented New Jersey's 4th congressional district in the United States House of Representatives from 1863 to 1867
- Chaz Stevens (born 1964), political activist and entrepreneur
- Red Strader (1902–1956), football player and coach
- Matt Valenti (born 1984), two-time national champion wrestler for the University of Pennsylvania who won the 133 pound weight class at the NCAA tournament in both 2006 and 2007
- Jenny Owen Youngs (born 1981), singer-songwriter

== Points of interest ==
- Newton Cemetery
- Newton Town Green
- Old Newton Burial Ground is a historic cemetery that was the primary burial ground in the town for a century after its establishment in 1762.
- Spring Street
- Sussex County Courthouse – The original courthouse was constructed in 1765 and destroyed by fire in 1847. The structure was rebuilt in 1848.
- Sussex County Community College
  - Horton Mansion on the SCCC campus
