= Jeff Fogelson =

American athletic director (1947–2018)

- Born: February 3, 1947; Newton, New Jersey, U.S.
- Died: February 6, 2018 (aged 71); Montgomery, Ohio, U.S.
- Education: Lafayette College; Michigan State University

Jeffrey Fogelson (February 3, 1947 – February 6, 2018) was the athletic director at Seton Hall University from 1998 to 2006. From 1984 to 1998, he served as associate vice president and director of athletics at Xavier University. In 2008, he was inducted into the Xavier Athletics Hall of Fame.

== Career ==
Fogelson received a Bachelor's degree from Lafayette College, and a master's degree from Michigan State University. From 1978 to 1983, he was associate athletic director at Georgetown University.

== Personal life ==
Fogelson was born on February 3, 1947, in Newton, New Jersey. In 1969, he married Nancy Eriksen. The couple had four children. He died on February 6, 2018, in Montgomery, Ohio.
