= New Jersey Herald =

American daily broadsheet newspaper

Coordinates: 41.059538°N 74.754337°W

- The August 19, 2008 front page of the New Jersey Herald.
- Type: Daily newspaper
- Format: Broadsheet
- Owner: USA Today Co.
- Publisher: Keith Flinn
- Editor: Bruce Tomlinson
- Founded: 1829
- Language: American English
- Headquarters: 2 Spring Street, Newton, New Jersey
- Country: United States
- Circulation: 11,220 Daily; 17,430 Sunday (as of 2008)
- ISSN: 0893-3677
- OCLC number: 12198584
- Website: www.njherald.com

The New Jersey Herald is a newspaper published six days (Sunday-Friday) every week. Its headquarters are in Newton, New Jersey. It is the only daily newspaper published in Sussex County, New Jersey and one of the oldest in the state. It has a distribution that reaches into both Morris County and Warren County in New Jersey, as well as Pike County, Pennsylvania, and Orange County, New York.

== History ==
The New Jersey Herald was first published in 1829 on a weekly basis, making it one of New Jersey's oldest published newspapers. In 1925, the paper got its first permanent home when a one-story building was built on High Street in Newton. In 1968, its headquarters moved to its current location at 2 Spring Street. The New Jersey Sunday Herald first published on June 11, 1962. In 1969, it was sold to American Newspapers Inc. The daily edition was first published March 16, 1970. Quincy Newspapers acquired the company in March 1980. On May 16, 2019, it was announced that GateHouse Media had purchased the New Jersey Herald. The 2 Spring Street building was not part of the sale and was sold separately. Soon after its purchase, its parent company, New Media Investment Group, bought Gannett in a merger that assumed its name and its headquarters in Virginia, with Mike Reed as CEO. Today, The New Jersey Herald is published six days a week (Sunday-Friday, excluding Saturday).

== Coverage ==
The New Jersey Herald covers many local news and sporting events mainly throughout Sussex County, and regularly publishes articles from the Associated Press that cover state, national, and world events.
