= Sussex County Historical Society (New Jersey) =

- Hill Memorial
- U.S. National Register of Historic Places
- New Jersey Register of Historic Places
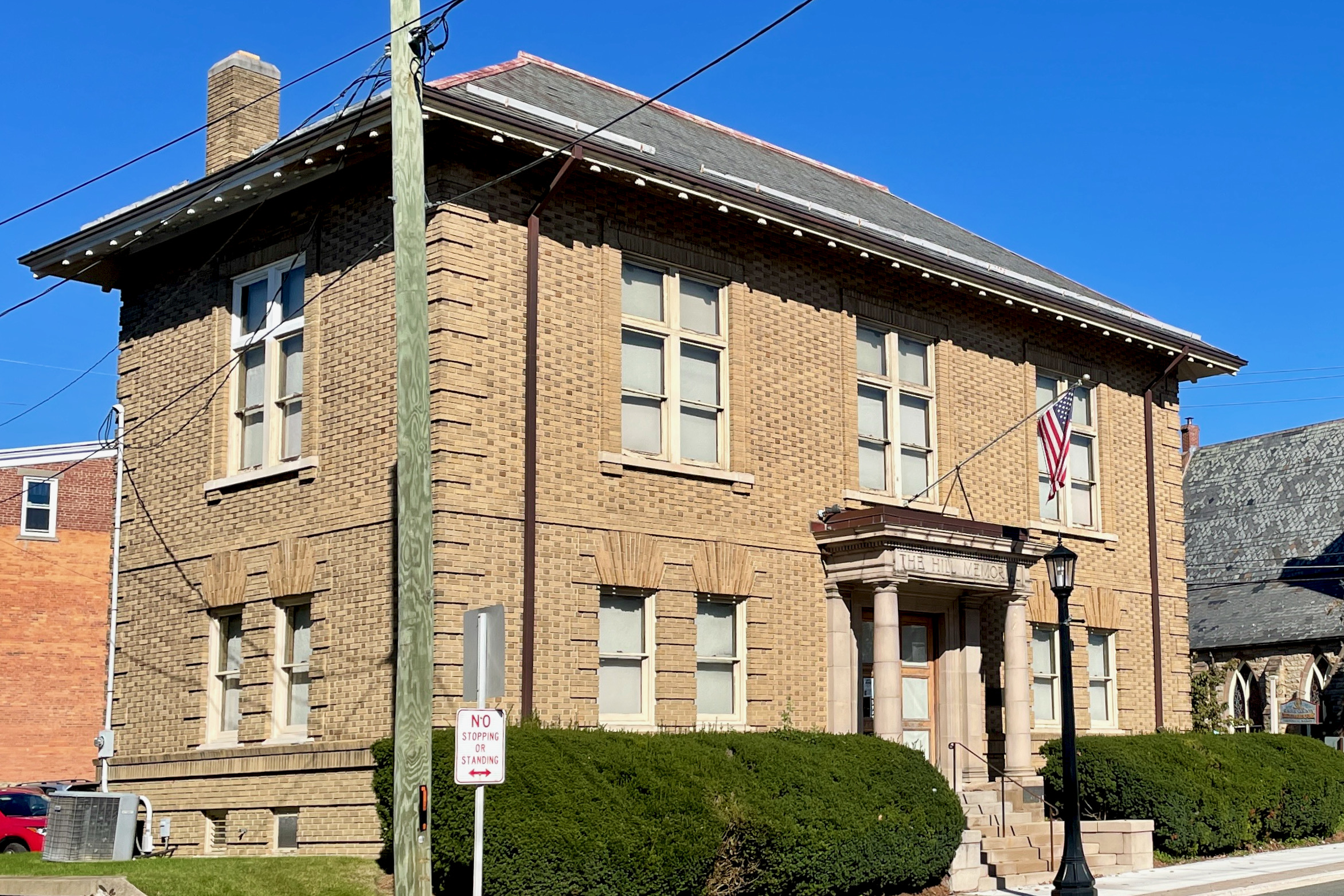
- The Hill Memorial in 2021

- Location within Sussex County, New Jersey Location within New Jersey Location within the United States
- Location: 82 Main Street, Newton, New Jersey
- Coordinates: 41°3′24″N 74°45′17″W
- Built: 1916
- Built by: Thomas Farrel
- Architect: Henry T. Stephens
- Architectural style: Renaissance revival
- NRHP reference No.: 85001565
- NJRHP No.: 2612

Significant dates
- Added to NRHP: July 18, 1985
- Designated NJRHP: May 13, 1985

The Sussex County Historical Society is a non-profit organization incorporated in 1904 in the State of New Jersey. It is located in Newton, in Sussex County, New Jersey, United States, and pursues a mission of promoting public knowledge and interest in the county's heritage.

== Hill Memorial Museum ==
Hill Memorial Museum at 82 Main Street in Newton, was constructed for the historical society in 1916 and has served as its home since then. It was built in the renaissance revival style to the design of Henry T. Stephens, an architect from Paterson, New Jersey by local contractor Thomas Farrel. It was dedicated on June 8, 1917, and named after three relatives of the main donor, Joshua Hill. It is the oldest building continuously operated as a museum in the State of New Jersey. The Hill Memorial was placed on the New Jersey Register of Historic Places and National Register of Historic Places on July 18, 1985, for its significance in architecture, education, and social history.

The entry hall has a grand staircase made of quartered oak. The exterior walls are constructed in brick in two shades made by the N.H. Sloan kilns of Pennsylvania. Ornaments for the entrance were manufactured by the Brick Terra Cotta & Tile Company of Corning, New York. A 1922 fireplace on the ground floor was made by George Sharp with stones of local geological and historic significance.

The second floor houses collections of quilts and other textiles, farming tools, baskets and other household items, Civil War memorabilia, and a partial skeleton of a Mastodon discovered nearby.

== See also ==
- National Register of Historic Places listings in Sussex County, New Jersey
- List of historical societies in New Jersey
- List of museums in New Jersey
