= First Presbyterian Church (Newton, New Jersey) =

Historic church in New Jersey, United States

First Presbyterian Church of Newton
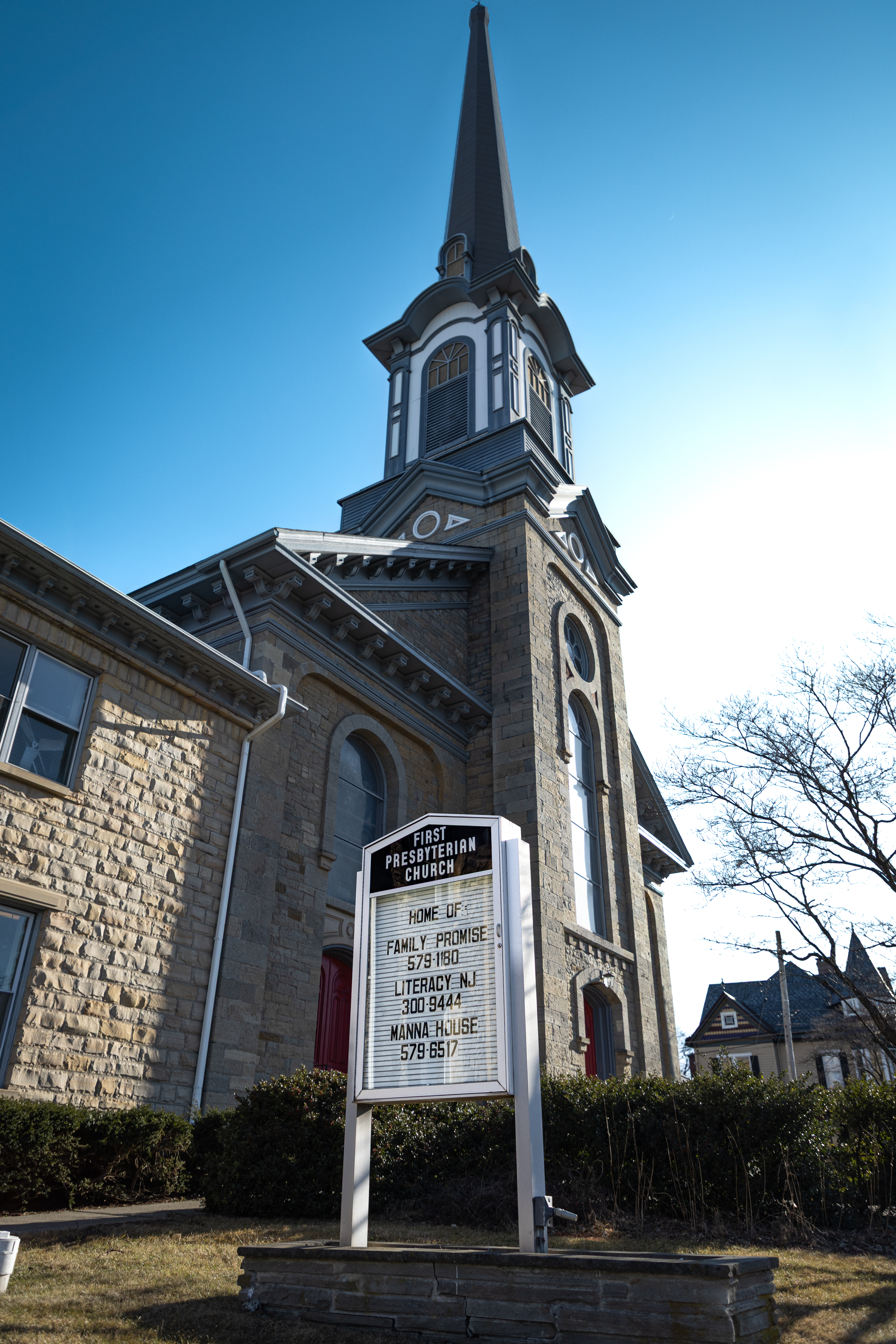
- Facade and steeple
- First Presbyterian Church of Newton
- 41°03′28.0″N 74°45′17.0″W
- Location: 54 High Street; Newton, Sussex County, New Jersey
- Country: United States
- Denomination: Presbyterian Church (USA)
- Website: fpcnewtonnj.org

History
- Status: Church
- Founded: 1786

Architecture
- Functional status: Active
- Style: Italianate and Renaissance Revival
- Groundbreaking: 1869
- Completed: 1872

Clergy
- Pastor: The Rev. Michael J. Cuppett

The First Presbyterian Church of Newton (or Newton Presbyterian Church) is a Christian house of worship located in the Town of Newton in Sussex County, New Jersey. This congregation, established in 1786, is a congregation of the Presbytery of the Highlands of New Jersey and the Presbyterian Church (USA).

The first church building was erected in the 1786 at the time Rev. Ira Condit, a 1784 graduate of Princeton University was installed as the congregation's first pastor. This first edifice was razed for a larger, second building at the site, erected 1828-1829. The third and present edifice was built in 1869–1872 of native blue limestone and described as being "plain but beautiful...in its simple style of architecture." While described as simple, the building is a combination of architectural styles that is chiefly Italianate and Renaissance Revival architecture but incorporates elements associated with the Classical Revival and Romanesque Revival styles. The church was damaged in an 1893 fire, and restored with funds from parishioners, including Newton industrialist Henry W. Merriam (1828–1900). At this time, Merriam donated several stained glass windows, including one over the altar depicting Jesus Christ in the Garden of Gethsemane.

On 26 October 1979, the First Presbyterian Church of Newton was placed on the New Jersey Register of Historic Places. It is also included as part of the Newton Town Plot Historic District which was approved and entered on the National Register of Historic Places on 12 November 1992.

== Food Programs ==
During the winter of 1987, the congregation's Board of Deacons proposed establishing an ecumenical soup kitchen. In the following three decades, Manna House's operations and reach expanded to include over two dozen worshipping communities in addition to paid staff.

Through Manna House and Bread of Life Newton, free, hot meals are provided six days a week to members of the wider community experiencing food insecurity.

== Nonprofit Involvement ==
The First Presbyterian Church of Newton houses the Sussex County branch of Literacy New Jersey, which provides English as a second or foreign language classes, American Civics Test preparation, and literacy programs.

Family Promise of Sussex County, which provides a range of services including housing stabilization and eviction diversion, is headquartered in the church's Spurgeon House at 19 Church Street.

== See also ==
- Christ Church, Newton
- Newton Cemetery (Newton, New Jersey)
- Old Newton Burial Ground
