= Henry Merriam =

Henry Merriam may refer to:

- Henry C. Merriam (1837–1912), United States Army general
- Henry W. Merriam (1828–1900), American industrialist and shoe manufacturer
