= General Dodge =

General Dodge may refer to:

- Charles C. Dodge (1841–1910), Union Army brigadier general
- Francis S. Dodge (1842–1908), U.S. Army brigadier general
- George Sullivan Dodge (1838–1881), Union Army brevet brigadier general
- Grenville M. Dodge (1831–1916), Union Army major general
- Henry Dodge (1782–1867), Michigan Territorial Militia major general

== See also ==
- General Dodds (disambiguation)
