= Robert Hamilton (New Jersey politician) =

American politician (1809-1878)

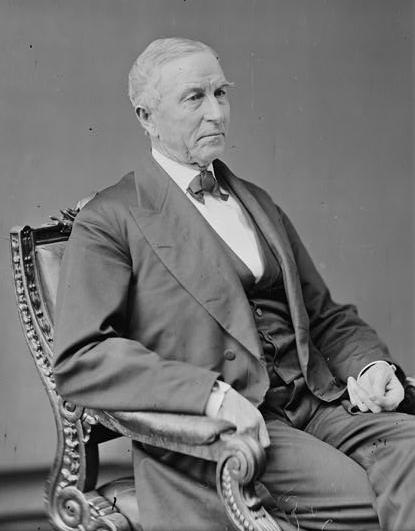

Member of the U.S. House of Representatives from New Jersey's 4th district
- In office March 4, 1873 – March 3, 1877
- Preceded by: John Hill
- Succeeded by: Alvah A. Clark

Personal details
- Born: December 9, 1809 Hamburg, New Jersey, USA
- Died: March 14, 1878 (aged 68) Newton, New Jersey, USA
- Resting place: Newton Cemetery
- Party: Democratic
- Spouse: Sarah E. Edsall Hamilton
- Profession: Politician, Lawyer, Bank President

Robert Hamilton (December 9, 1809 – March 14, 1878) was an American lawyer, bank president and Democratic Party politician who represented New Jersey's 4th congressional district in the United States House of Representatives from 1873 to 1877.

== Early life and career ==
Born in Hamburg, New Jersey, Hamilton attended common schools as a child. He moved Newton, New Jersey, in 1831, studied law and was admitted to the bar in 1836, commencing practice in Newton.

He was prosecutor of plea for Sussex County, New Jersey, from 1848 to 1858, 1868 and 1869, was a delegate to the 1860 Democratic National Convention, was a member of the New Jersey General Assembly in 1863 and 1864, serving as Speaker of the House, and was president of Merchant’s National Bank from 1865 to 1878.

== Congress ==
Hamilton was elected a Democrat to the United States House of Representatives in 1872, serving from 1873 to 1877. Afterward, he resumed practicing law and was director of the Morris and Essex Railroad. He died in Newton, New Jersey, on March 14, 1878, and was interred in Newton Cemetery in Newton.

== Private life ==
Hamilton and his wife were parishioners at Christ Church, Newton, the town's episcopal parish, and provided substantial financial support for the construction of the church's current house of worship completed in 1869.

== Death and burial ==
He died in Newton, New Jersey, on March 14, 1878, and was interred in Newton Cemetery in Newton.

U.S. House of Representatives
Preceded by John Hill	Member of the U.S. House of Representatives from New Jersey's 4th congressional district March 4, 1873 – March 3, 1877	Succeeded by Alvah A. Clark
