= Alvah A. Clark =

American politician from New Jersey (1840-1912)

Alvah Augustus Clark
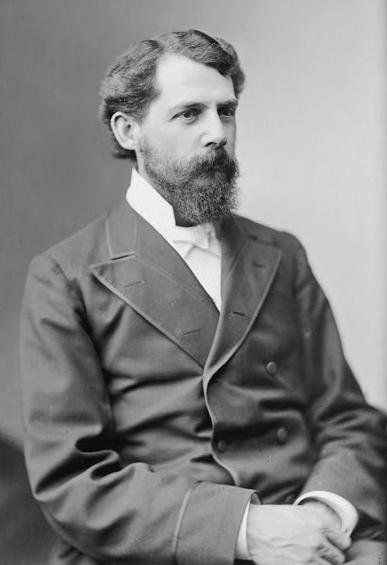

Member of the U.S. House of Representatives from New Jersey's 4th district
- In office March 4, 1877 – March 3, 1881
- Preceded by: Robert Hamilton
- Succeeded by: Henry S. Harris

Personal details
- Born: September 13, 1840 Lebanon Township, New Jersey, US
- Died: December 27, 1912 (aged 72) Somerville, New Jersey, US
- Party: Democratic
- Profession: Politician, Lawyer

Alvah Augustus Clark (September 13, 1840 – December 27, 1912) was an American lawyer and Democratic Party politician who represented New Jersey's 4th congressional district in the United States House of Representatives for two terms in the 45th and 46th congress from 1877 to 1881.

He was the first cousin of James N. Pidcock, who represented the same district from 1885 to 1889.

== Early life and career ==
Born in Lebanon Township, New Jersey, Clark attended public and private schools as a child, studied law and was admitted to the bar in 1863, commencing practice in New Germantown, New Jersey. He was licensed as a counselor in 1867 and moved to Somerville, New Jersey, later the same year where he continued to practice law.

== Political career ==
Clark was elected as a Democrat to the Forty-fifth and Forty-sixth Congresses, serving in office from March 4, 1877 – March 3, 1881, but was not a candidate for renomination in 1880.

After leaving Congress, Clark resumed practicing law, was appointed postmaster of Somerville, serving until 1899 and, once again, resumed practicing law until his death in Somerville on December 27, 1912. He was interred in New Somerville Cemetery in Somerville.

U.S. House of Representatives
Preceded by Robert Hamilton	Member of the U.S. House of Representatives from New Jersey's 4th congressional district March 4, 1877 – March 3, 1881	Succeeded by Henry S. Harris
