= Bartholomew Gill =

American novelist

- Born: Mark C. McGarrity; July 22, 1943; Holyoke, Massachusetts, U.S.
- Died: July 4, 2002 (aged 58); Morristown, New Jersey, U.S.
- Education: Brown University; Trinity College Dublin
- Occupations: Novelist; writer; columnist
- Spouse: Margaret McGarrity
- Children: 1
- Writing career
- Pen name: Bartholomew Gill
- Genres: Crime fiction; mystery fiction

Bartholomew Gill was the pen name of Mark C. McGarrity (July 22, 1943 – July 4, 2002), an Irish-American crime fiction and mystery novelist and newspaper features writer and columnist writing on nature and outdoor recreation for The Star-Ledger. He was the author of 22 mystery novels, set in Ireland, and featuring a "resourceful police detective named Peter McGarr." For his pen name, McGarrity used the name of his maternal grandfather, Bartholomew Gill, who "was a great storyteller." McGarrity wrote five novels and a work of nonfiction under his real name, and his writings for the Star-Ledger were published under his true name.

== Biography ==
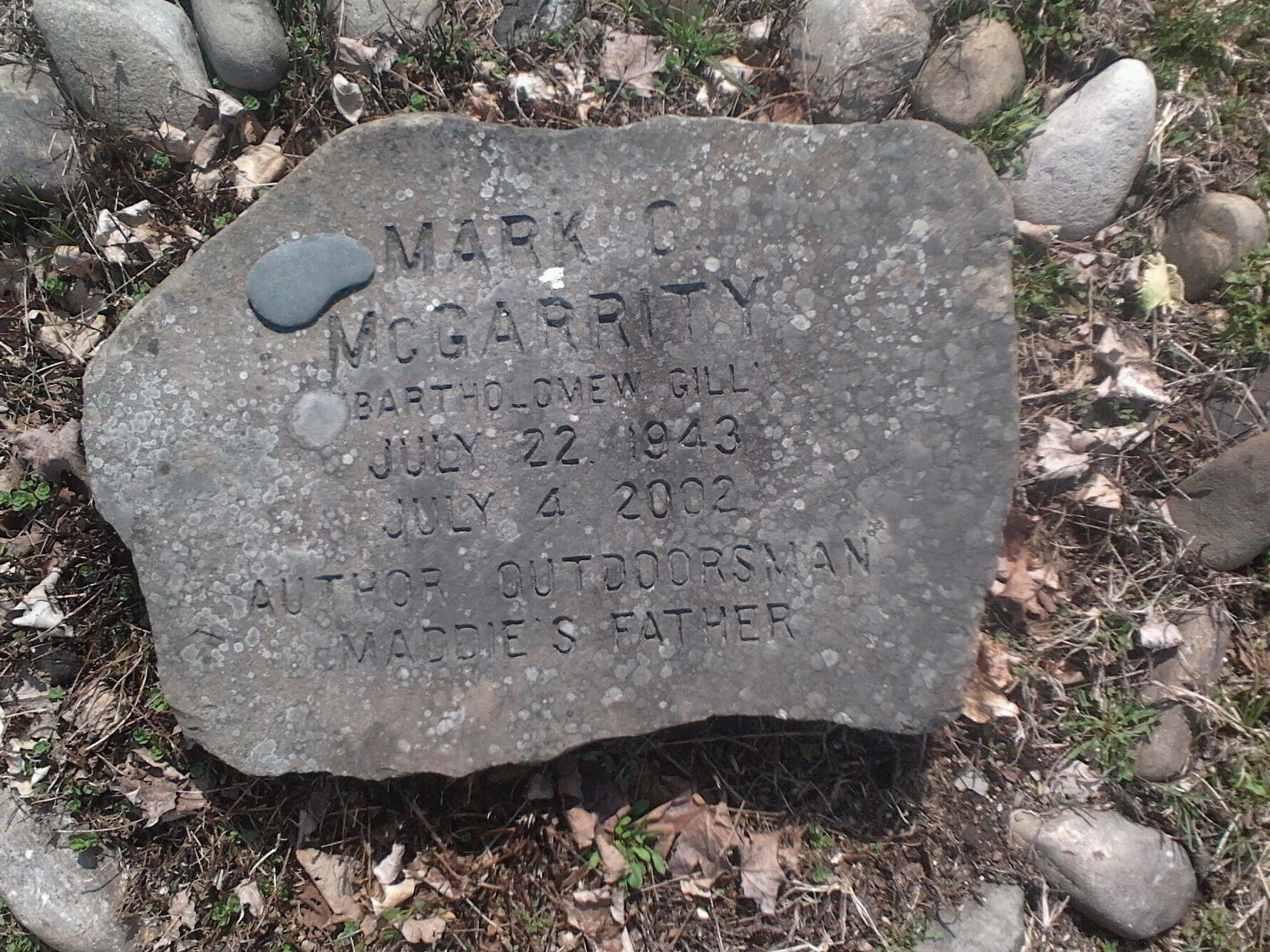
McGarrity's tombstone with his pen name in Newton Cemetery in Newton, New Jersey

Mark C. McGarrity was born on July 22, 1943, in Holyoke, Massachusetts, McGarrity received a bachelor's degree from Brown University in Providence, Rhode Island, and a master's degree from Trinity College, Dublin. His marriage to Margaret McGarrity ended in divorce.

McGarrity died on July 4, 2002, aged 58, from injuries sustained in a fall at his Morristown, New Jersey, home. He had forgotten his keys and attempted to enter his home by climbing through a window. He was survived by a daughter, Madeleine, and a brother, George. He was interred in Newton Cemetery, in Newton, New Jersey, where his gravestone identifies him by both his real name and pen name, and as "author, outdoorsman, Maddie's father".

== Works ==
Under the name "Mark C. McGarrity"

- 1973: Little Augie's Lament
- 1973: Lucky Shuffles
- 1981: A Passing Advantage
- 1990: Neon Caesar
- 1991: White Rush/Green Fire
- 1993: A Guide to Mental Retardation: A Comprehensive Resource for Parents, Teachers, and Helpers Who Know, Love, and Care for People With Mental Retardation

Under the name "Bartholomew Gill"

- 1977: McGarr and the Politician's Wife (a.k.a. The Death of an Irish Politician)
- 1977: McGarr and the Sienese Conspiracy (a.k.a. The Death of an Irish Consul)
- 1978: McGarr on the Cliffs of Moher (a.k.a. The Death of an Irish Lass)
- 1979: McGarr at the Dublin Horse Show (a.k.a. The Death of an Irish Tradition)
- 1983: McGarr and the P.M. of Belgrave Square
- 1984: McGarr and the Method of Descartes
- 1986: McGarr and the Legacy of the Woman Scorned
- 1989: The Death of a Joyce Scholar
- 1992: The Death of Love
- 1993: Death on a Cold, Wild River
- 1995: The Death of an Ardent Bibliophile
- 1996: The Death of an Irish Sea Wolf
- 1997: The Death of an Irish Tinker (a.k.a. Death of a Busker King)
- 2000: The Death of an Irish Lover
- 2001: The Death of an Irish Sinner
- 2002: Death in Dublin

== See also ==
- List of pen names
