= Christ Church, Newton =

Historic church in New Jersey, United States

Christ Church
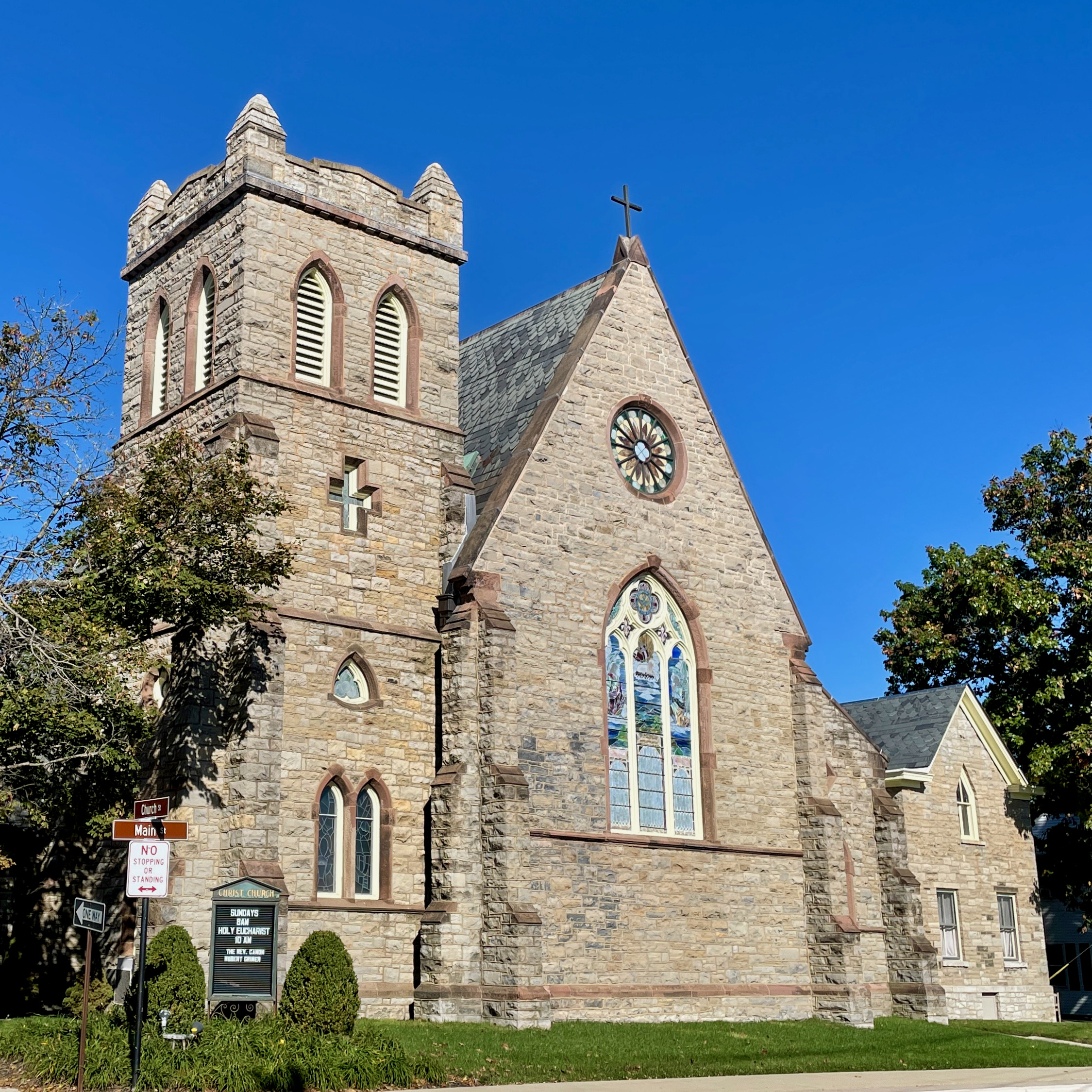
- Christ Church in 2021
- Christ Church
- 41.0570582°N 74.7539363°W
- Location: 62–66 Main Street, Newton, New Jersey
- Country: United States
- Denomination: Episcopalian
- Website: christchurchnewton.org

History
- Founded: 28 December 1769
- Consecrated: 20 October 1869

Architecture
- Architect: Jonathan V. Nichols
- Style: Gothic Revival (Broken Ashlar, Rustic Mode)
- Years built: 1868–1869
- Groundbreaking: 21 August 1868 (cornerstone laid)

Specifications
- Materials: Native blue limestone, Newark Sandstone trimmings

Administration
- Diocese: Episcopal Diocese of Newark

Clergy
- Rector: The Rev'd Robert T. Griner

Christ Church, also known as Christ Episcopal Church, is a Christian house of worship located on the corner of Church Street and Main Street (U.S. Route 206) in Newton, New Jersey. It is a parish overseen by the Episcopal Diocese of Newark, a diocese of the Episcopal Church in the United States of America. The congregation first met on 28 December 1769 and was granted a charter by New Jersey's last Royal Governor William Franklin on behalf of Britain's King George III. Christ Church is the oldest church in Newton and the third oldest parish in the Diocese of Newark. (Note: Founded in 1769, Christ Church was third behind Trinity Church in Newark, founded in 1742, and Christ Church in Belleville, founded in 1746. Christ Church, Newton predates the establishment of the diocese. The Diocese of New Jersey, which oversaw the entire state, was organized in 1785. It was later divided and northern regions of the state were overseen by the Diocese of Northern New Jersey in 1874 which was renamed the Diocese of Newark in 1886.)

The church reported 621 members in 2015 and 608 members in 2023; no membership statistics were reported in 2024 parochial reports. Plate and pledge income reported for the congregation in 2024 was $433,344 with average Sunday attendance (ASA) of 138 persons.

The current church building, erected in 1868–1869, is the second structure built at the site, and is an example of the Broken Ashlar or Rustic mode of Gothic Revival architecture patterned after medieval English parish churches. The interior nave features several stained-glass windows depicting scenes from the life of Jesus of Nazareth fabricated by J&R Lamb Studios. On 24 September 1992, Christ Church, Newton was included on the New Jersey Register of Historic Places as part of the Newton Town Plot Historic District which was approved and entered on the National Register of Historic Places on 12 November 1992.

== History ==
=== Establishment ===
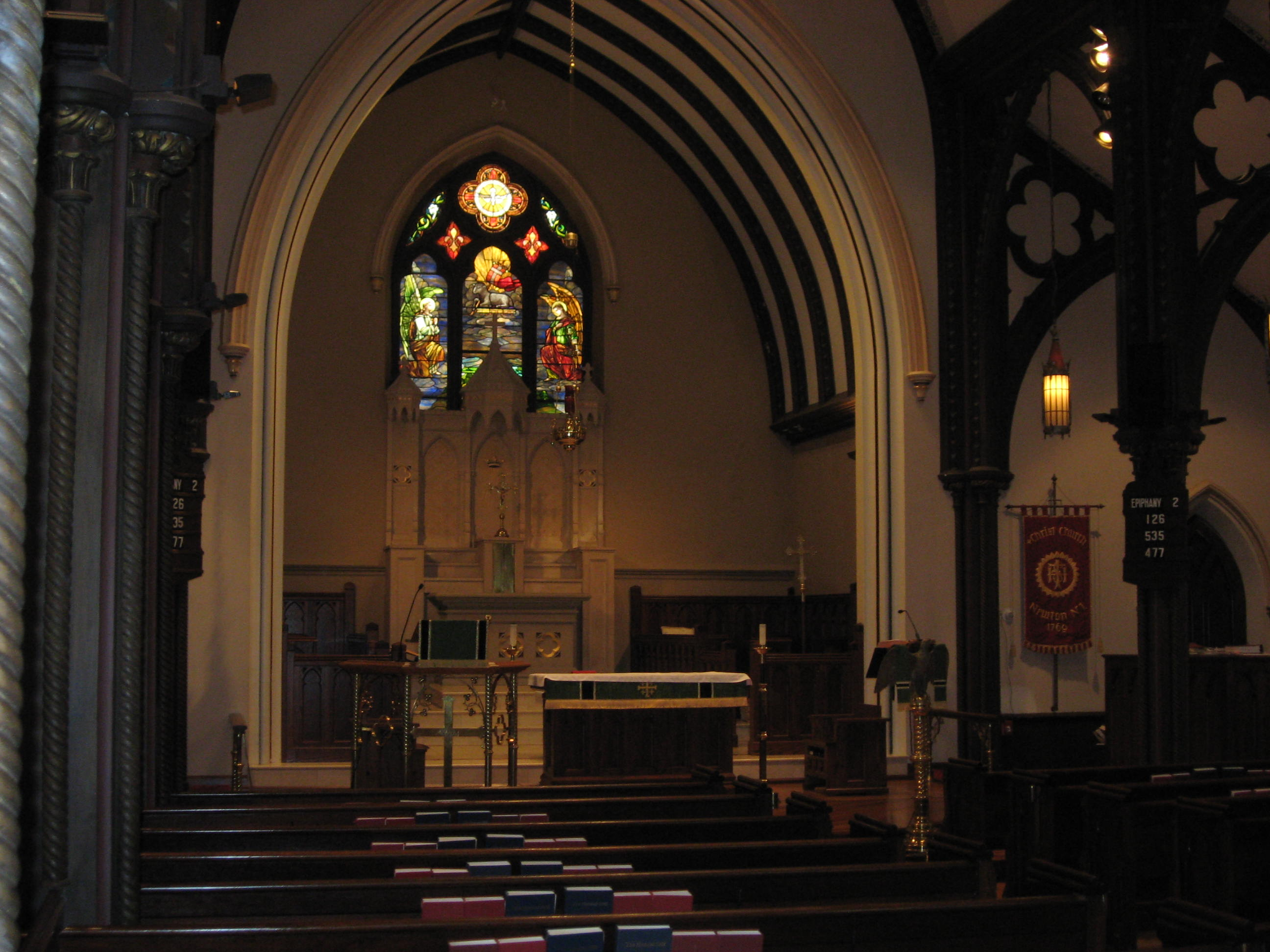
Interior of Christ Church, facing the altar and chancel

In a 1770 letter, the Rev'd Dr Thomas B. Chandler, rector of St John's Church in the provincial capital Elizabethtown (now Elizabeth), reported that he had visited Sussex County in the northwestern part of the province of New Jersey in November 1769 and found that there were 50 families belonging to the Church of England in the region. Chandler reported that "they frequently assemble in private houses and read the Liturgy" and that an Anglican clergyman "had never been in those parts before." Many of these families met at Newton, the county seat of Sussex County, on 28 December 1769, to establish an Anglican parish. (Note: The Newtown Precinct, also known as "New Town", and later Newtown Township and Newton Township, was established in 1751. The town of Newton first started in the 1760s as a village called Sussex Court House, was renamed when the post office was renamed in 1797 to Newtown and later Newton. The Town of Newton in its present form was incorporated in 1864 when Newtown Township was divided for the final time.)

On 15 August 1774, Christ Church was formally incorporated as The Rector, Church Wardens, and Vestrymen of Christ's Church at New Town, in the county of Sussex and province of New Jersey. The colony's last royal governor, William Franklin, granted and signed a charter on behalf of Britain's King George III. The congregation petitioned the East Jersey Board of Proprietors, a colonial land agency, asking for their assistance to establish a church. The board granted a warrant for 200 acres (81 ha) of land yet unappropriated in Sussex County to serve as an income-generating glebe to support the church. The tract chosen by the congregation was located approximately 3.5 miles (5.6 km) south of Newton (in present-day Fredon Township, then part of Hardwick Township) and conveyed to the church on 16 December 1774 by the colony's last royal attorney general, Cortlandt Skinner, and John Johnston. Jonathan Hampton (1716–1777), a landowner, coachmaker, and merchant from Elizabethtown, deeded lands from his surveyed town plot to the congregation on 14 December 1774 "for the encouragement of the Episcopal religion...and toward the maintenance & support of a parson officiating in said church".

=== Early history (1769–1869) ===
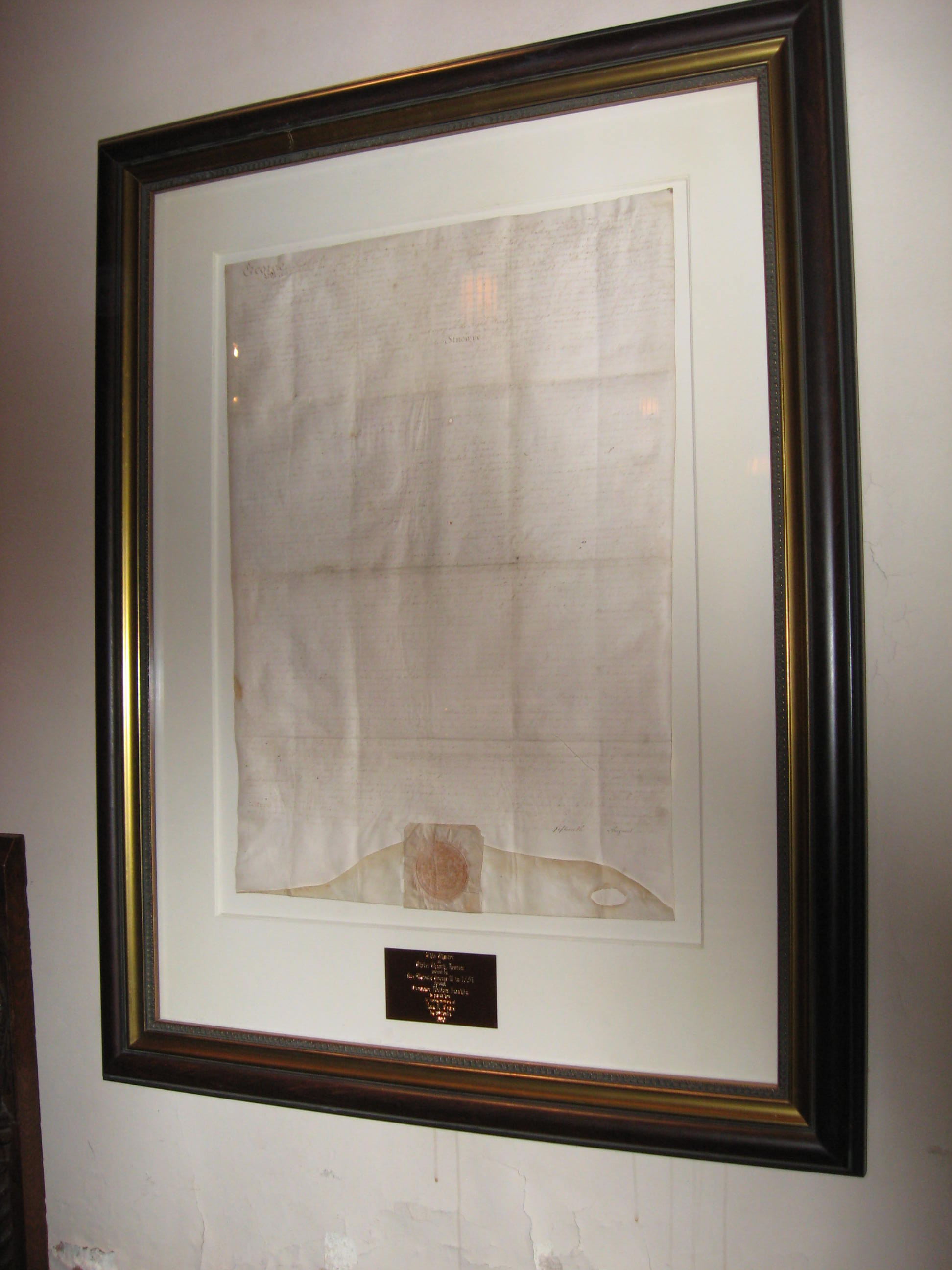
In 1774, Royal Governor William Franklin signed the charter that incorporated "Christ's Church at New Town, in the county of Sussex...".

The congregation called for a clergyman, and the Rev'd Uzal Ogden, Jr. (1744–1822) was sent as a missionary lay reader and catechist in 1770 to the area on behalf of the Society for the Propagation of the Gospel. He would become rector in 1773 after his ordination. According to local historian Kevin Wright, the parsonage was built circa 1770 by local land agent John Pettit. During his tenure, Ogden held services at Newton on the third Sunday each month as he served an area of roughly 2,000 square miles (5,200 km^{2}) and divided other Sundays among congregations in Roxbury, Knowlton, and Hackettstown. Services were held in the County Court House (built 1762–1765), which he described in 1771 as "very commodious and serves us to perform Divine Service in". During the Revolution, Ogden supported the cause of American independence, and according to tradition quartered sheep in the parsonage basement for the use of the Continental Army. Ogden left Christ Church in 1784 to become an assistant at Trinity Church in New York City, and later served as rector of Trinity Church, Newark, where his father served as warden.

Although Ogden was listed as Christ Church's rector until as late as 1792 and preached infrequently in the area, the rectorate in Newton remained without a clergyman until the appointment of the Rev'd Clarkson Dunn in 1820. During the 36 years, services were held irregularly, at the court house; this was an era described as "a long period of discouragement, almost of dissolution." The congregation reported only six communicants during this time. Dunn would operate a school at the rectory beginning in December 1823. Assisted by William Rankin, an English teacher, Dunn taught classics. Dunn remained in this charge until 1857 when his son-in-law, the Rev'd Nathaniel Pettit, assumed the pulpit.

The congregation's first church building was erected beginning in May 1823 and consecrated a few months later on 19 November 1823 by the Rt Rev'd John Croes, Bishop of New Jersey. This building was located at the corner of Church and Main streets, on a tract of land conveyed to the congregation by William T. Anderson, a local attorney. The Gothic structure was described as small; it accommodated 250 worshipers. Toward the end of Pettit's tenure, the congregation was compelled to build a new church building as their current building had become unstable and unsafe. During the construction, the congregation met at the county courthouse and at Rinker's Hall, a building located near the courthouse on the Newton Town Green.

=== Current church (1869–present) ===
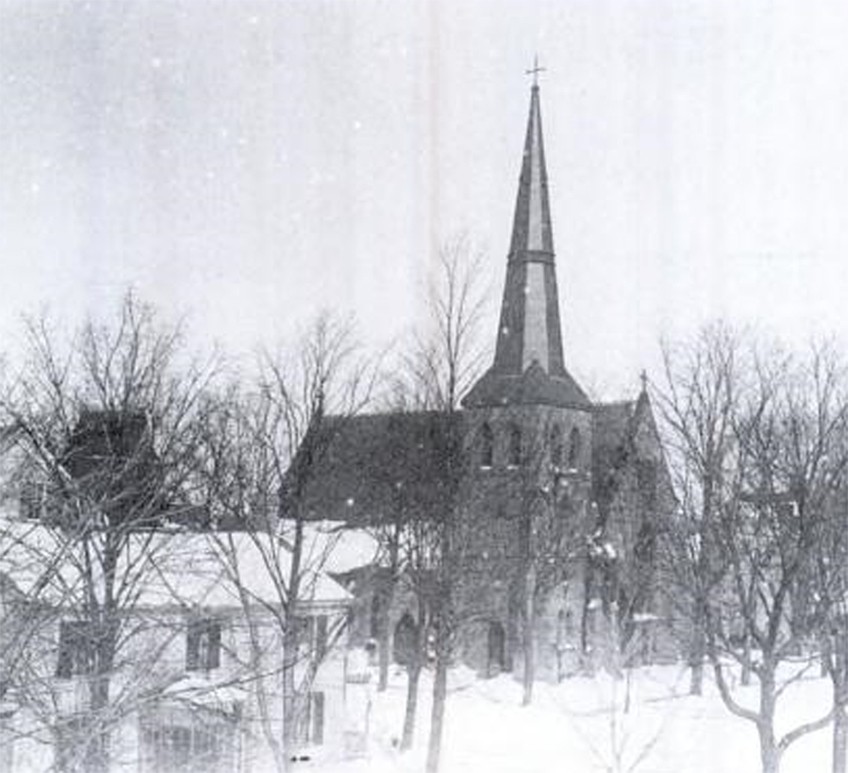
Christ Church, seen from across the street, during Winter 1910

According to Snell, during the forty-five-year tenures of Dunn and Pettit as rectors, "parochial statistics from 1820 to 1867 show an aggregate of 510 baptisms, 241 confirmations, 334 marriages, and 468 funerals". The growth in membership necessitated a new, larger edifice. To fund the construction of a new church building, the congregation sought the permission of the state legislature to sell the lands granted to it by warrant. Permission was given in 1867. The congregation sold this property on 10 May 1868 for $15,579. The congregation also sold its parsonage and accompanying lands for $17,600 to prominent lawyer, Levi Shepherd in October. A loan to support the construction was provided by Robert Hamilton (1809–1878), a vestryman and warden and generous financial contributor to the parish. Hamilton was a prominent political figure, serving in the New Jersey General Assembly in 1863 and 1864, the latter year as Speaker, and from 1873 to 1877, he represented the New Jersey's 4th congressional district (covering northwestern New Jersey) in the United States House of Representatives. In 1879, a year after Hamilton's death, his widow Sarah forgave the loan, which left the church debt free after the construction.

Local historian Frank Greenagel writes that "the Episcopal church formalized its adherence to the English Gothic style in the late 1840s under the influence of a powerful bishop, George Washington Doane", and that the parish at Newton among many in the state adhere to that style. The vestry and diocese contracted "for the building of a new church...for $23,000" on the site of the old church building by contractor Isaac L. Overton of Newark, New Jersey from a design by architect Jonathan V. Nichols. The first service was held on 11 July 1869, and the building was consecrated by the Bishop of New Jersey, the Rt Rev'd, William Henry Odenheimer (1817–1879) on 20 October 1869. Today the structure boasts a three-story bell tower, but previously the tower was topped by a 108-foot high spire surmounted by a 12-foot high cross. This spire was removed after being struck by lightning on three occasions.

A rectory, built in 1868–1869, was used for that purpose for thirty years before being renovated for activity space for church organizations and fellowship. In October 1901, the Vestry of Christ Church authorised purchase of a new rectory located on Liberty Street. Holley Hall, the central facility for parish activities, was constructed with a 1965 bequest from the estate of Alice Herbert Holley, daughter-in-law of the Rev'd William Welles Holley, fourth rector, who was the first to reside in the former rectory after its completion in 1869.

== Architecture, furnishings and fittings ==
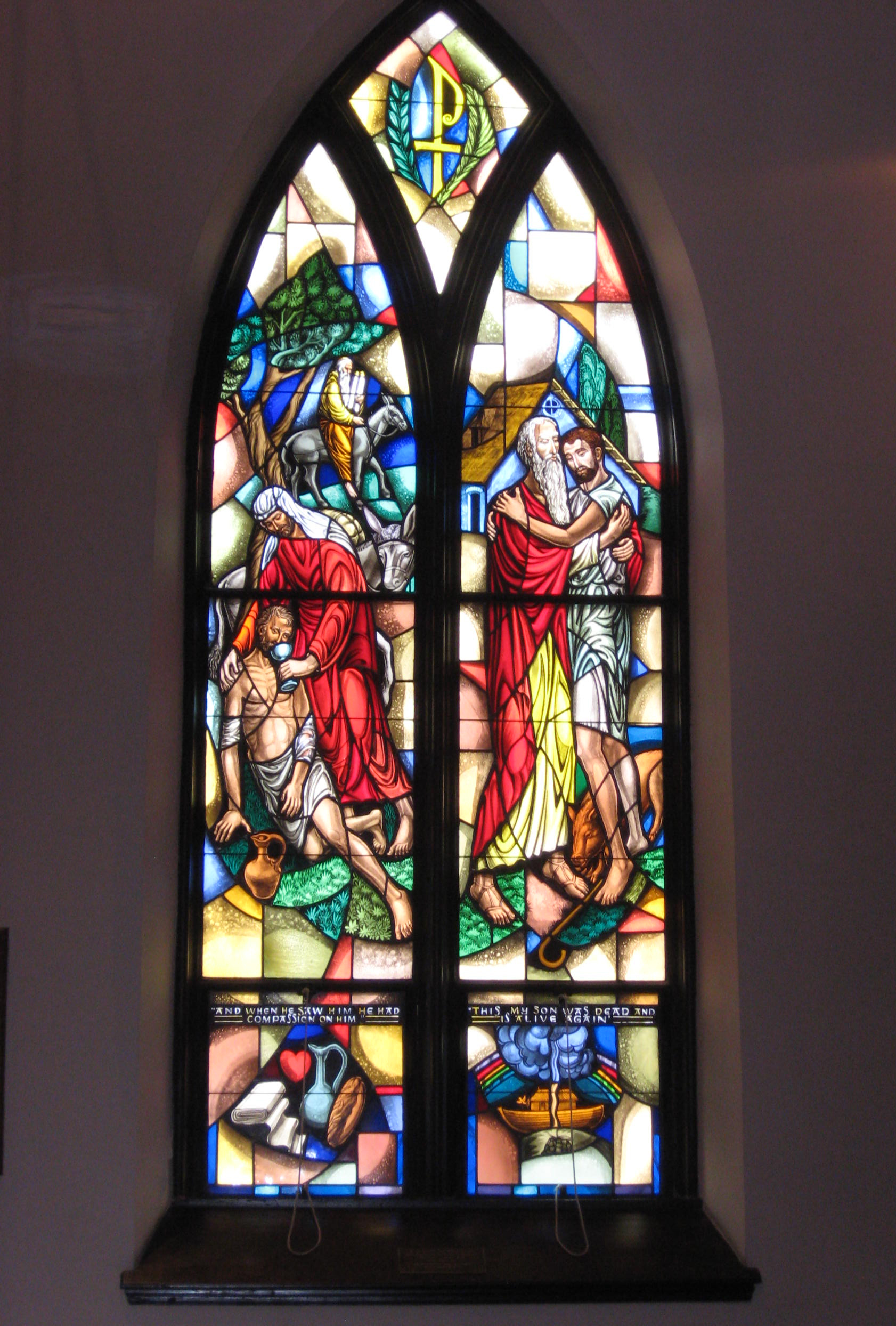
A lancet window depicting the parables of the Good Samaritan and the Prodigal Son

On 24 September 1992, Christ Church, Newton was placed on the New Jersey Register of Historic Places as part of the Newton Town Plot Historic District which was approved and entered on the National Register of Historic Places on 12 November 1992. The 17.2-acre (7.0 ha) historic district comprises 56 contributing structures which were built on Jonathan Hampton's surveyed town plot for the town of Newton (then Sussex Court House).

Designed by architect Jonathan V. Nichols, the current church building was erected 1868–1869 and is an example of the Broken Ashlar or Rustic mode of Gothic Revival architecture. It was designed in a "simple basilican style of nave flanked by shed aisles (no clerestory)", that was "patterned upon medieval English parish churches". The cornerstone was laid on 21 August 1868 and the building was constructed of native blue limestone, with trimmings in Newark sandstone, with a roof of patterned or traceried black slate that was quarried in Newton.

Christ Church's contribution to the historic district includes the church building and a Gothic Revival style rectory, built in 1868. The site also includes an eighteenth-century Federal-style townhouse that was the home of Colonel Thomas Anderson (c.1743–1805), deputy assistant quartermaster general of the Continental Army during the American Revolution, one of the parish's original vestrymen (elected in 1769) and warden of Christ Church from 1784 to 1794. A Newton attorney with statewide prominence, Anderson was the first Surrogate of Sussex County (appointed in 1768) and also served as County Clerk from 1770 to 1777. His home, built about 1785, was originally located on Park Place one-half block to the north of the church property and faced Newton's town green before being relocated adjacent to the church property at 62 Main Street in 1896. In 1965, it was purchased by Christ Church and serves as the parish office. The Anderson House in 1958 was marked with an historical plaque by the Society of Daughters of Colonial Wars in New Jersey.

When completed in 1869, the church's interior could accommodate 400 parishioners, and featured a tint-glass chancel window by Fredericks of Brooklyn. Today, the interior is adorned with a Tiffany-style window above the altar, dedicated in 1919, and several pictorial stained-glass windows (dedicated in 1968) around the nave featuring scenes associated with the life of Jesus of Nazareth. The nave windows are the works of the United States' oldest continuously run decorative arts firm, J & R. Lamb Studios, and include work designed by stained-glass artist Heinrich Jan Van de Burgh. They including depictions of:

- The Annunciation,
- The Nativity of Jesus,
- The Holy Family's flight into Egypt,
- Christ as a boy in the Temple,
- The Baptism of Jesus,
- The Temptation of Christ in the desert,
- The calling of the disciples
- The marriage at Cana
- Christ's blessing of the Children
- The Entry into Jerusalem on Palm Sunday
- The Last Supper
- Jesus in prayer in the Garden of Gethsemane
- Various parables from the Gospels,
- Scenes of Christ's crucifixion, resurrection, and ascension.

== Rectors ==
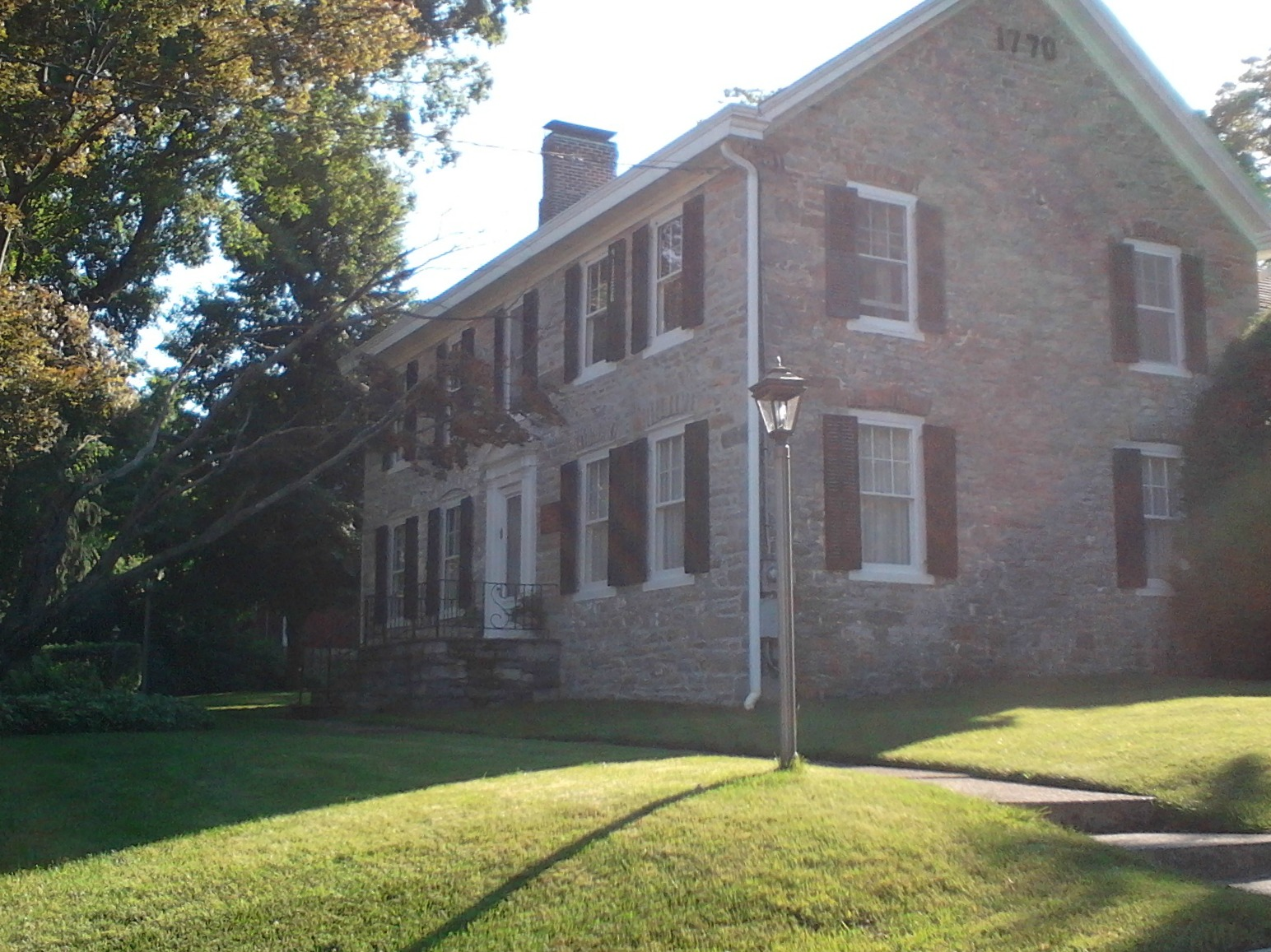
Today a private residence, Christ Church's first parsonage, built circa 1770, is the oldest home in Newton, New Jersey.

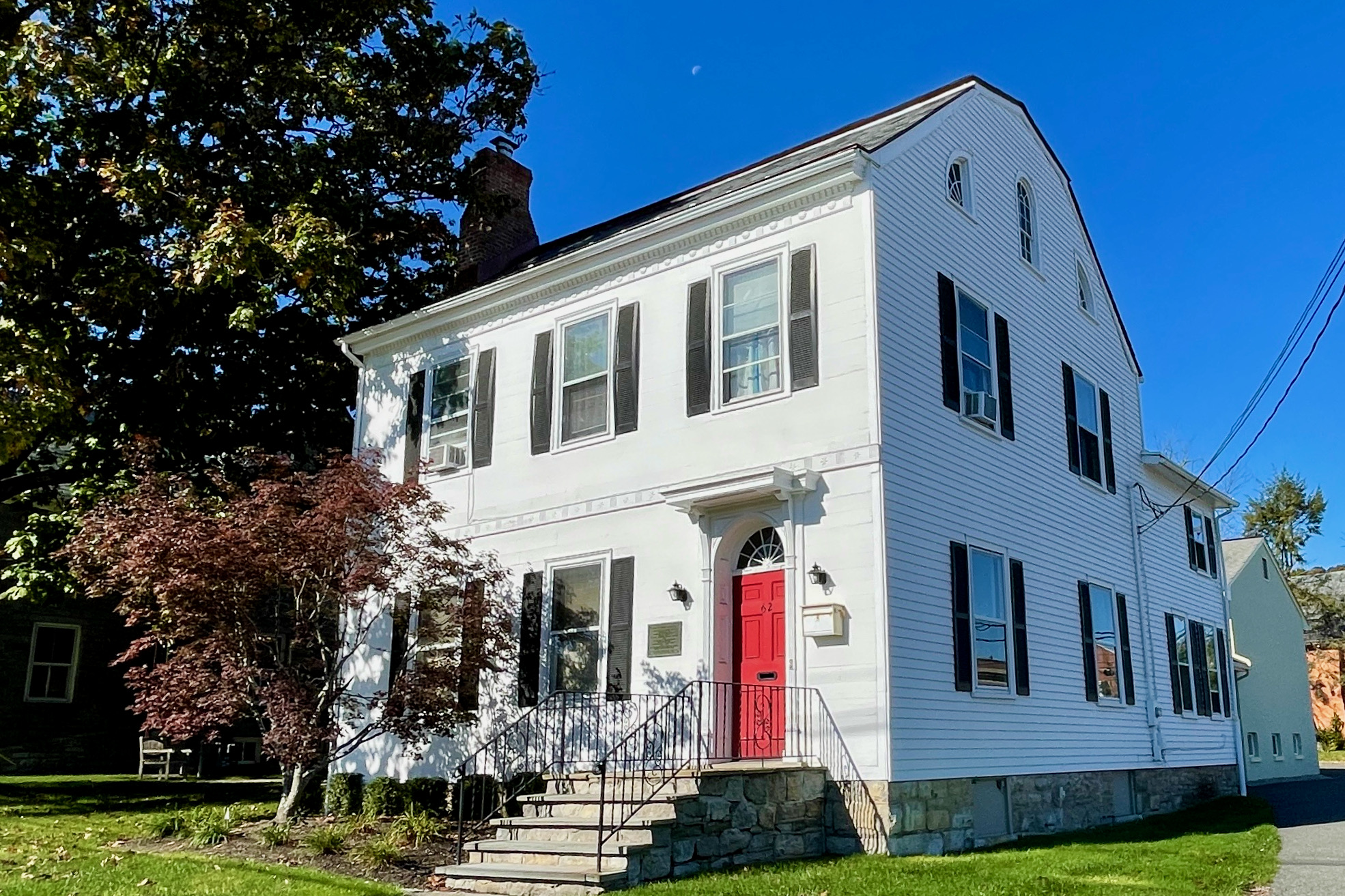
Thomas Anderson House, built in 1785, houses the parish offices.

Eighteen clergymen have served as rector of Christ Church, Newton. The first, Uzal Ogden, Jr., was the son of Newark merchant and churchwarden. Ogden began to serve in northwestern New Jersey in 1770 and, in addition to Newton, covered an area of 2,000 square miles including St James Episcopal Church in Knowlton Township, New Jersey (founded in 1769). Because of the lack of a bishop in Britain's North American colonies, Ogden traveled to England to be ordained by the Rt Rev'd Richard Terrick, the Bishop of London, who had jurisdiction over all parishes of the Church of England in North America. After his departure in 1784, the pulpit remained unfilled until 1823. During this time, several clergymen, including the Reverend John Croes (1762–1832), later the first Bishop of New Jersey, officiated on occasion.

The second rector, Clarkson Dunn, served both the Newton congregation and St James in Knowlton. Dunn, who died in 1870, was honored by the town of Newton with the naming of two streets, Clarkson Street and Dunn Place, which frame the property of the parish's old parsonage. After a ten-year tenure, Dunn's son-in-law, Nathaniel Pettit, resigned in 1867 to become Sussex County's first Superintendent of Schools. Moffett, who served as rector for fifteen years, resigned from the pulpit to accept an appointment from President Grover Cleveland to become the American minister (essentially ambassador) to Greece in 1885.

The current rector, Robert T. Griner, received a bachelor's degree in Psychology from Drew University and studied at the University of Oxford before completing a Master of Divinity degree at Yale University.

#	Rector	Term began	Term ended
1	The Rev'd Uzal Ogden, Jr. (1744–1822)	1770 (1773) (Note: While Ogden was installed in 1770, he did not officially become "Rector" until ordination to the priesthood in 1773.)	1784
–	Vacant	1784	1820
2	The Rev'd Clarkson Dunn (1794–1870)	1820 (1823) (Note: While Dunn was installed in 1820, he did not officially become "Rector" until ordination to the priesthood in 1823.)	1857
3	The Rev'd Nathaniel Pettit (1825–1885)	1857	1867
4	The Rev'd William Welles Holley (1841–1916)	1868	1870
5	The Rev'd William Henry Moffett (1834–1890)	1870	1885
6	The Rev'd Samuel Edson (1844–1898)	1885	1892
7	The Rev'd Charles Leighton Steele, Sr. (1863–1938)	1892	1910
8	The Rev'd James E. Hall (1844–1913) (acting) (Note: Hall was the curate from 1909 to 1913.)	1910	1911
9	The Rev'd Ernest G. Tuthill	1911	1915
10	The Rev'd George A. Green	1915	1919
11	The Rev'd Gilbert Lee Pennock	1919	1923
12	The Rev'd George Hewlett	1923	1927
13	The Rev'd Oscar Meyer	1928	1934
14	The Rev'd George Hewlett	1934	1947
15	The Rev'd Leonard F. Nichols	1947	1963
16	The Rev'd William L. Dougherty	1963	1981
17	The Rev'd Joseph D. Herring	1983	1998
18	The Rev'd Bradford G. Whitaker	1998	2002
19	The Rev'd Robert T. Griner	2003	present

== See also ==
- First Presbyterian Church (Newton, New Jersey)
- National Register of Historic Places listings in Sussex County, New Jersey
- Newton Cemetery (Newton, New Jersey)
- Episcopal Diocese of Newark
