= General Dodd =

General Dodd may refer to:

- Carl Dodd (Irish Army officer) (c. 1942–2018), Irish Army major general
- Francis Dodd (general) (1899–1973), U.S. Army brigadier general
- George A. Dodd (1852–1925), U.S. Army brigadier general

== See also ==
- General Dodds (disambiguation)
