= Henry W. Merriam House =

Historic house in New Jersey, United States

- U.S. National Register of Historic Places
- New Jersey Register of Historic Places
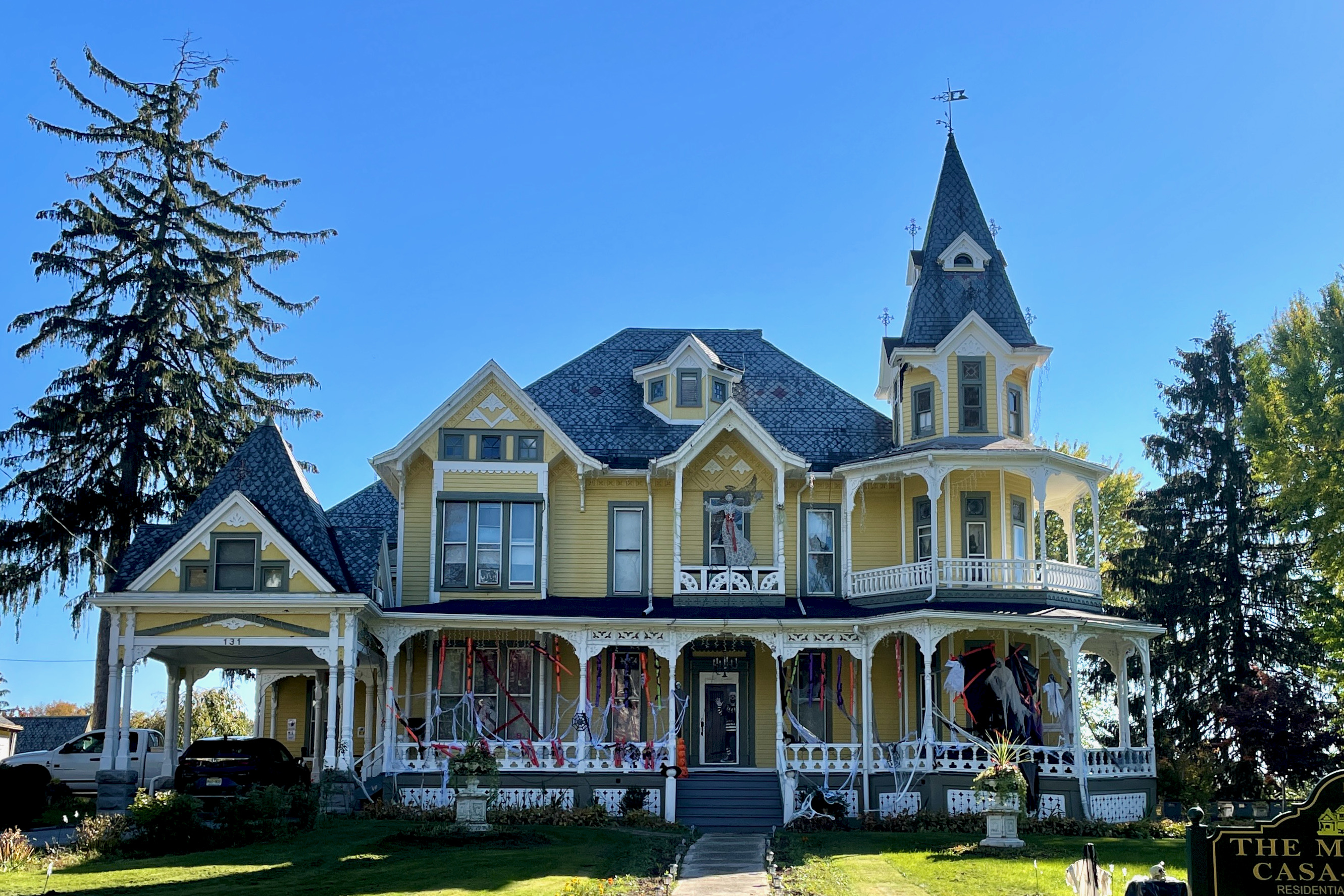

- Location within Sussex County, New Jersey Location within New Jersey Location within the United States
- Location: 131 Main Street, Newton, New Jersey
- Coordinates: 41°3′10″N 74°45′20″W
- Area: 3 acres (1.2 ha)
- Built: 1883
- Architectural style: Late Victorian
- NRHP reference No.: 70000396
- NJRHP No.: 2613

Significant dates
- Added to NRHP: December 18, 1970
- Designated NJRHP: September 11, 1970

The Henry W. Merriam House, also known as the Merriam Home, is an historic mansion located at 131 Main Street in the town of Newton in Sussex County, New Jersey, United States. It was added to the National Register of Historic Places on December 18, 1970, for its significance in architecture and social history. It is Newton's prime example of High Victorian architecture.

== History and description ==
The house was built in 1883 by the industrialist Henry W. Merriam (1828–1900), president of the H. W. Merriam Shoe Company. After his death, it was used as a home for retired Presbyterian ministers. In 1972, it was sold to the Assembly of God.

== See also ==
- National Register of Historic Places listings in Sussex County, New Jersey
