= General Dodds =

General Dodds may refer to:

- Alfred-Amédée Dodds (1842–1922), French general of division
- Thomas Dodds (1873–1943), Australian Army major general
- W. O. H. Dodds (1867–1934), Canadian Expeditionary Force brigadier general

== See also ==
- General Dodd (disambiguation)
- General Dodge (disambiguation)
