= Henry S. Harris =

American lawyer and politician (1850–1902)

Henry Schenck Harris
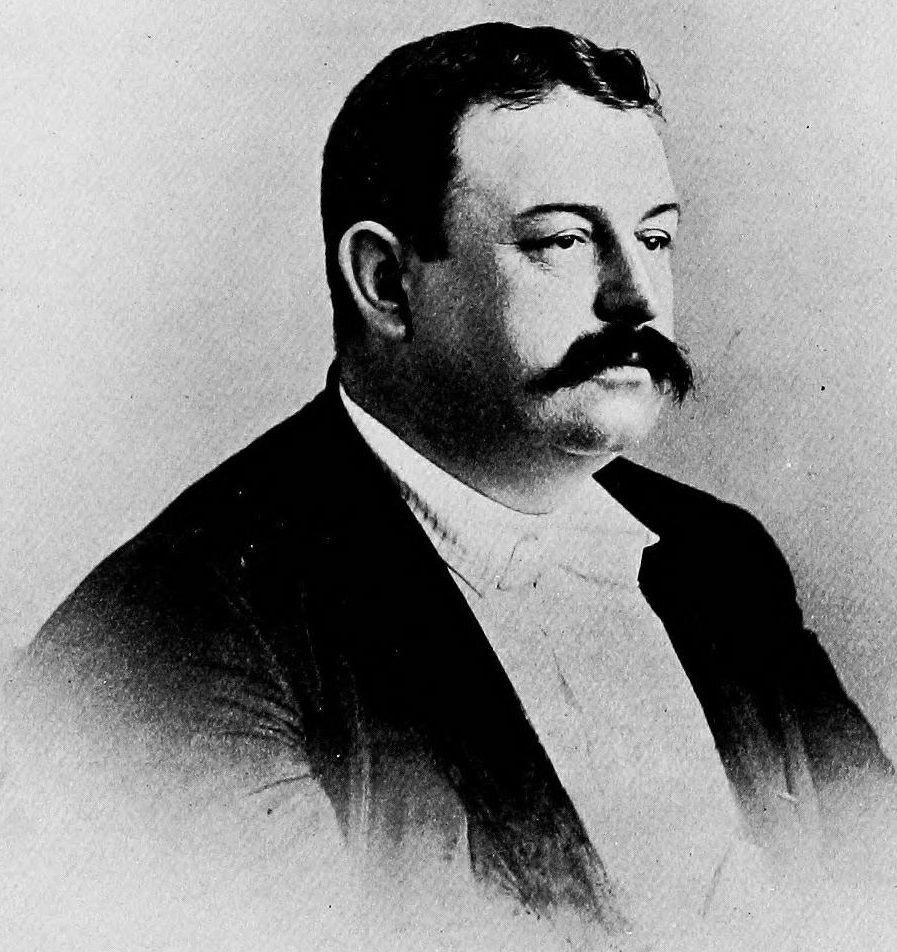

Member of the U.S. House of Representatives from New Jersey's 4th district
- In office March 4, 1881 – March 3, 1883
- Preceded by: Alvah A. Clark
- Succeeded by: Benjamin Franklin Howey

Personal details
- Born: December 27, 1850 Belvidere, New Jersey, USA
- Died: May 2, 1902 (aged 51) Belvidere, New Jersey, USA
- Party: Democratic
- Profession: Politician, Lawyer

Henry Schenck Harris (December 27, 1850, Belvidere, New Jersey – May 2, 1902, Belvidere, New Jersey), was an American lawyer and Democratic Party politician who represented New Jersey's 4th congressional district for one term in the United States House of Representatives from 1881 to 1883.

== Early life and education ==
Harris was born in Belvidere, New Jersey on December 27, 1850. He attended the common schools and was graduated from Princeton College in 1870. He studied law, was admitted to the bar in 1873 and commenced practice in Belvidere. He was appointed prosecutor of the pleas for Warren County in March 1877.

== Congress ==
Harris was elected as a Democrat to the Forty-seventh Congress, serving in office from March 4, 1881 – March 3, 1883, but was an unsuccessful candidate for reelection in 1882 to the Forty-eighth Congress.

== After Congress ==
After leaving Congress, he resumed the practice of law. He died in Belvidere at the age of 51 on May 2, 1902, and was interred in Belvidere Cemetery.

U.S. House of Representatives
Preceded by Alvah A. Clark	Member of the U.S. House of Representatives from New Jersey's 4th congressional district March 4, 1881–March 3, 1883	Succeeded by Benjamin Franklin Howey
