= George Sullivan Dodge =

American diplomat

George Sullivan Dodge (August 3, 1838 – August 24, 1881) was a Union Army officer during the American Civil War, a United States consul to Bremen, Germany, and a merchant.

== Biography ==
Dodge, the son of William P. and Nancy B. Dodge (1806-1853), was born on August 4, 1838, in Irasburg, Vermont, Dodge became a prominent merchant. With the outbreak of hostilities in the American Civil War, Dodge entered a volunteer regiment for the Union Army and was appointed colonel in the army's Quartermaster Department. During the war's later years, he served as Chief Quartermaster of the Army of the James under Major General Benjamin F. Butler and later under Major General Edward O.C. Ord.

On January 26, 1865, President Abraham Lincoln nominated Dodge for appointment to the grade of brevet brigadier general to rank from January 15, 1865, for his last-minute resupply of beleaguered Union forces at the Second Battle of Fort Fisher (January 13–15, 1865) and the United States Senate confirmed the appointment on February 14, 1865. He later participated in the Battle of Wilmington (February 11–22, 1865). After the war, Dodge served as the United States Consul in Bremen, Germany (1866-1869).

Dodge died on August 24, 1881, in the city of Oakland, California, and was initially buried there in the city's Mountain View Cemetery. Five months later, his body was disinterred and reburied in Newton Cemetery in Newton, New Jersey.

== See also ==
- List of American Civil War brevet generals (Union)
