= Henry W. Merriam =

American industrialist (1828–1900)

Henry Wilson Merriam (20 June 1828 – 26 October 1900) was an American Industrialist and owner of the H. W. Merriam Shoe Company, a 19th- and early-20th century manufacturer of shoes for ladies and children founded in New York City, and after 1873 operated in Newton, in Sussex County, New Jersey.

== Biography ==
Henry W. Merriam was born on 20 June 1828 at Merriam Hill in Mason, Hillsborough County, New Hampshire to Elisha J. and Lucy R. (Lane) Merriam. Merriam was graduated from the Appleton Academy, a private school in New Ipswich, New Hampshire. On 16 June 1859, Merriam married Frances P. Gulliver (1839–1897), the daughter of George F. and Mary (Bush) Gulliver, of North Brookfield, Massachusetts. During the American Civil War, Merriam manufactured shoes and boots for the Union Army. After the war, he focused on the production of ladies' and children's shoes. In 1873, to avoid trouble with labor unions, Merriam moved his company to Newton, in northwestern New Jersey. Merriam was always held in high esteem by his employees, establishing a building and loan association to provide mortgages to his workers, and served on the boards of the First Presbyterian Church of Newton and the Merchant's National Bank. In 1892, to celebrate his 64th birthday, Merriam "distributed ten thousand dollars among those in his employ as a testimonial of his appreciation of their faithful performance of duty."

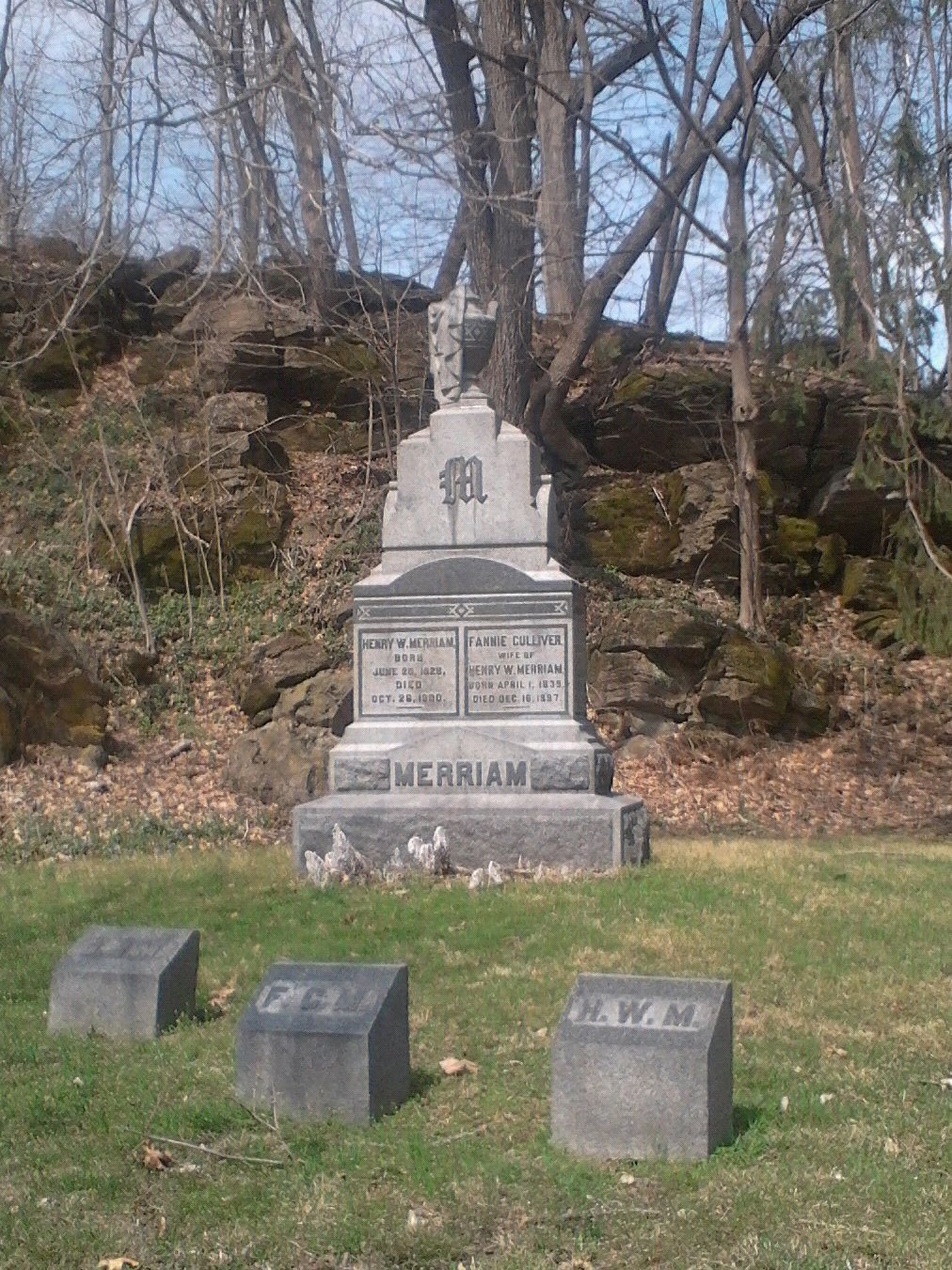
Gravestone of Henry W. Merriam and his wife Frances Merriam in Newton Cemetery in Newton, New Jersey

Merriam died on 26 October 1900 in Newton, New Jersey and was buried in Newton Cemetery.

The Henry W. Merriam House, built in 1883, is an example of high Victorian architecture and was placed on the New Jersey Register of Historic Places on 11 September 1970 and the National Register of Historic Places on 18 December 1970. After Merriam's death in 1900, the house was donated to the Presbyterian Board of Relief for Disabled Ministers and the Widows and Orphans of Deceased Ministers.
