= Literacy New Jersey =

American nonprofit organization

- Formation: 1 January 1979
- Type: 501(c)(3)
- Legal status: Nonprofit organization
- Purpose: Promote literacy
- Headquarters: 224 Main St. Metuchen, NJ 08840; Roselle (business office)
- Location: Eight counties, 18 affiliates
- Region served: New Jersey
- Services: literacy instruction
- Official language: English
- CEO: Elizabeth Gloeggler
- Volunteers: 2,500
- Website: literacynj.org

Literacy New Jersey is an American nonprofit organization founded in 1979 based in Roselle, New Jersey, which coordinates a network of volunteers to promote literacy in the Garden State. It provides free language services to persons who are illiterate or who have difficulty reading, writing, and speaking English. It runs courses for GED test preparation, citizenship instruction, English as a second or foreign language, basic literary skills, computer and conversation classes for Adult Basic Education or ABE, one-on-one tutoring as well as the tutoring of small and large groups. In addition, it assists persons with learning disabilities and persons with limited educational opportunities. Low literate adults are persons learning English for the first time, or persons who have spoken English throughout their lives but who have difficulty reading or writing or speaking the language. According to a national report, 17 percent of the residents of New Jersey are "low-literate or functionally illiterate". Instruction is confidential in the sense that the organization does not reveal names of students to the public. Many of the students are immigrants from other countries. During the COVID-19 pandemic, volunteers have been teaching students via Zoom and phone.

It is our job to make sure that adults in New Jersey know how to read, write and speak English.

— CEO Elizabeth Gloeggler, 2014

The nonprofit taught 8,000 students in 2013< and coordinates 2,500 volunteers working with 18 local affiliates. Students range in age from 18 to the late 70s. Typically, teacher-volunteers meet with students in public locations, such as public libraries, for several hours each week.

While the official headquarters is in Metuchen, the administration's main office is in Roselle, and the organization has locations throughout the state in the counties of Burlington, Gloucester, Mercer, Middlesex, Ocean and Union. With affiliates, it is able to offer instruction throughout the state.

In 2014, eight literacy nonprofits, including Literacy Volunteers of Mercer County, were consolidated into one organization entitled Literacy New Jersey. The reason for the merger, according to chief executive officer Elizabeth Gloeggler, was to make the support program more "cohesive, effective, and efficient," and to consolidate administrative tasks so local managers can focus on teaching rather than administrative tasks. The organization has partnered with Literacy Volunteers of New Jersey and with business executives such as Roseann Lentin of Turn the Page Publishing as well as Goldman Sachs. It raises donations from the public as well as through gala-style fundraisers. It promotes donations and encourages volunteers and students with Readathon programs.

Literacy New Jersey trains volunteers to become tutors with a 15-hour training program. Tutors do not have to have a special background but must be 18 years or older, have a high school diploma or its equivalent, and take the training course which meets for three hours for five times during a five-week period. A liaison committee brings more experienced tutors and new volunteers together to share teaching strategies.
