= Newton Cemetery (Newton, New Jersey) =

Cemetery in Newton, New Jersey, US

Coordinates: 41.0505°N 74.7520°W

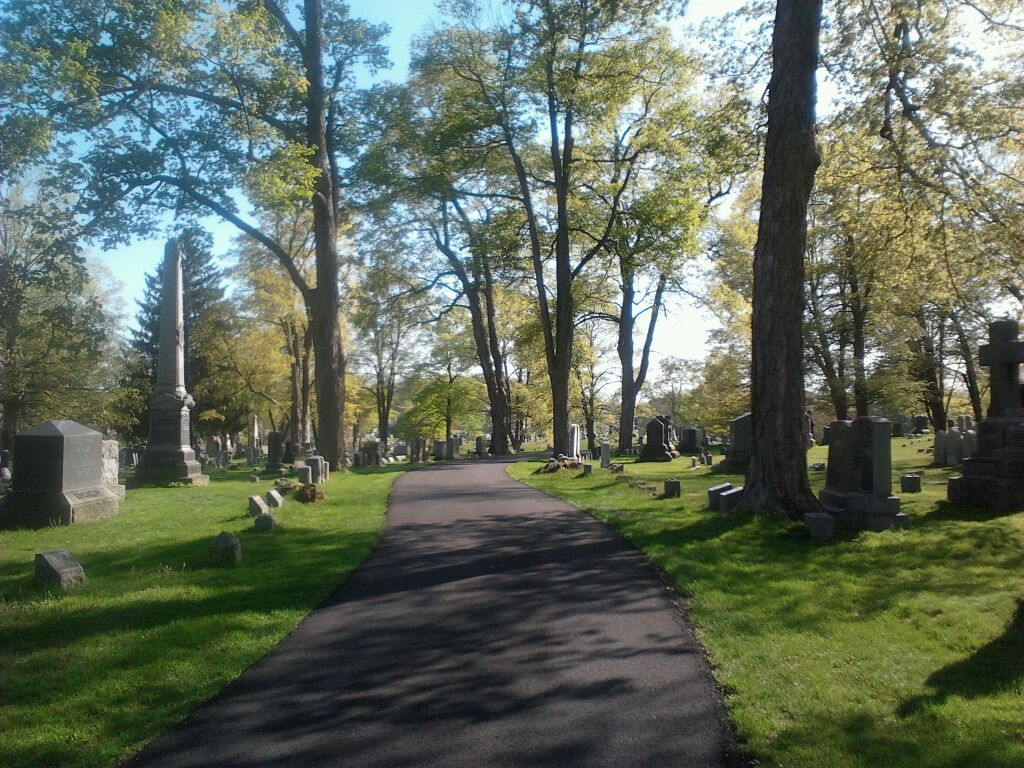
Looking southward in Newton Cemetery, May 2013

Newton Cemetery is a cemetery in Newton, in Sussex County, New Jersey, United States. Founded in 1860, the 24.05 acres (9.73 ha) cemetery is in current use and is owned and operated by the Newton Cemetery Company.

It is the "new" cemetery in town—opening after the Old Newton Burial Ground (founded 1762) was filled.

The Newton Cemetery Company was incorporated on 22 March 1860 by an act of the New Jersey state legislature. It named seven men as "corporators", including Michael B. Titman, Moses W. Northrup, attorney Daniel S. Anderson, Samuel Cassady, the Reverend Nathaniel Pettit (of Christ Church, Newton), Thomas N. McCarter, and Whitfield S. Johnson. By 1866, the corporators had raised funds—approximately $16,000—to purchase a 26 acres (11 ha) tract of land from the heirs of Aaron Peck and open for burials. According to James P. Snell, the first interment was for Joseph A. Linn, who was buried in August 1867. Five years later, in 1872, a local newspaper reported that "the number of interments is about 340--a large majority of which were re-interments from other places".

Burial options at Newton Cemetery include interment in the cemetery's Mausoleum Chapel, erected in 1991.

== Notable burials ==
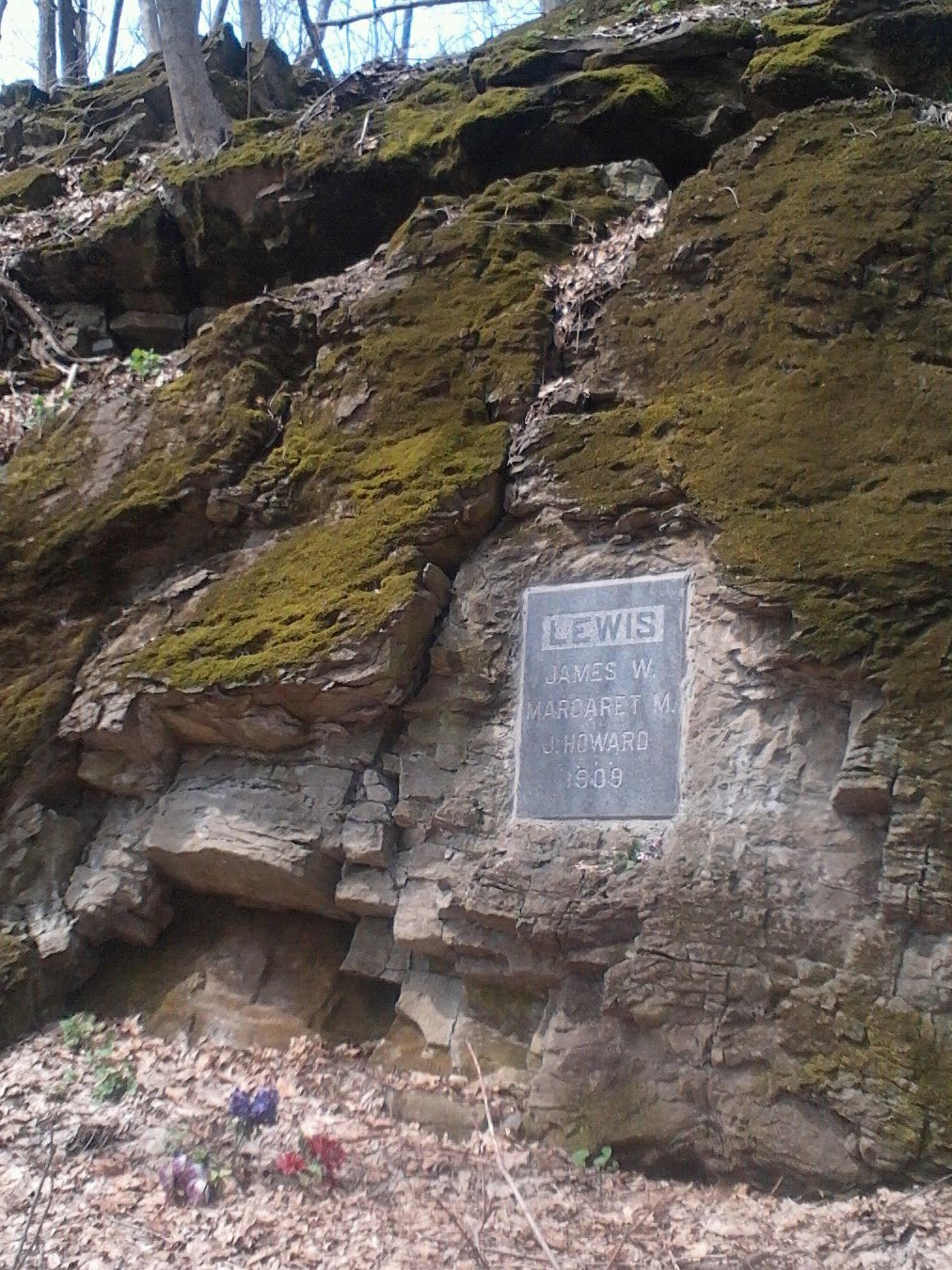
The grave marker for three children lost in caverns below Newton in 1909

- Jacob L. Bunnell (1855-1932), newspaperman, owner of Blairstown Press, New Jersey Herald, Sussex Independent.
- Thomas G. Bunnell (1834-189?), editor and later owner of the New Jersey Herald
- George Sullivan Dodge (1838-1881) Chief Quartermaster of the Army of the James, Battle of Fort Fisher, Bvt. Brigadier General, American Civil War
- Benjamin Edsall, poet, orator, editor of the Sussex Register
- Bartholomew Gill (Mark C. McGarrity) (1943-2002), American crime fiction-mystery novelist, newspaper feature writer.
- John Kays (1739-1829), Revolutionary War military officer, aide to George Washington.
- Henry C. Kelsey, New Jersey Secretary of State, leader of the Kelsey Ring
- Warren K. Lewis (1882-1975), MIT professor, "father of modern chemical engineering."
- Lewis J. Martin (1844-1913), represented New Jersey's 6th congressional district in 1913.
- Henry W. Merriam (1828-1900), industrialist and philanthropist
- Robert Hamilton (1809-1878), represented New Jersey's 4th congressional district from 1873 to 1877.
- Andrew J. Rogers, Copperhead congressman during Civil War
- Francis J. Swayze, Justice of the New Jersey Supreme Court.

=== The Lewis children's "cave grave" ===
In 1909, three local children were lost in the underground limestone caverns underneath the town of Newton. An entrance to these caves (now sealed) was located in the woods near the cemetery. Currently, a marker bearing the names of these three children, James W., Margaret, and J. Howard Lewis, is mounted in the face of the rock-outcropping approximately fifty-yards into the woods on the cemetery property. The magazine Weird NJ recounts that the daughter, Margaret found her way into the cave and got lost. Her two brothers went in to find her and also got lost. This tale is merely folklore as the family of James W. Lewis, his wife Margaret Lewis and their adoptive son James Howard Lewis can be found in the Newton New Jersey 1895 census, where James W. and Margaret Lewis are without a doubt listed as adults. Further research reveals a marriage record for them in 1859, as well as J. Howard Lewis death records and obituary in 1899 and Margaret's 1906 death and obituary. Newton Cemetery is largely re-interred plots, Margaret and J. Howard were initially buried in Deckertown Union Cemetery in Wantage, Sussex, New Jersey and re-interred here by James W. Lewis in 1909.

== Gallery ==
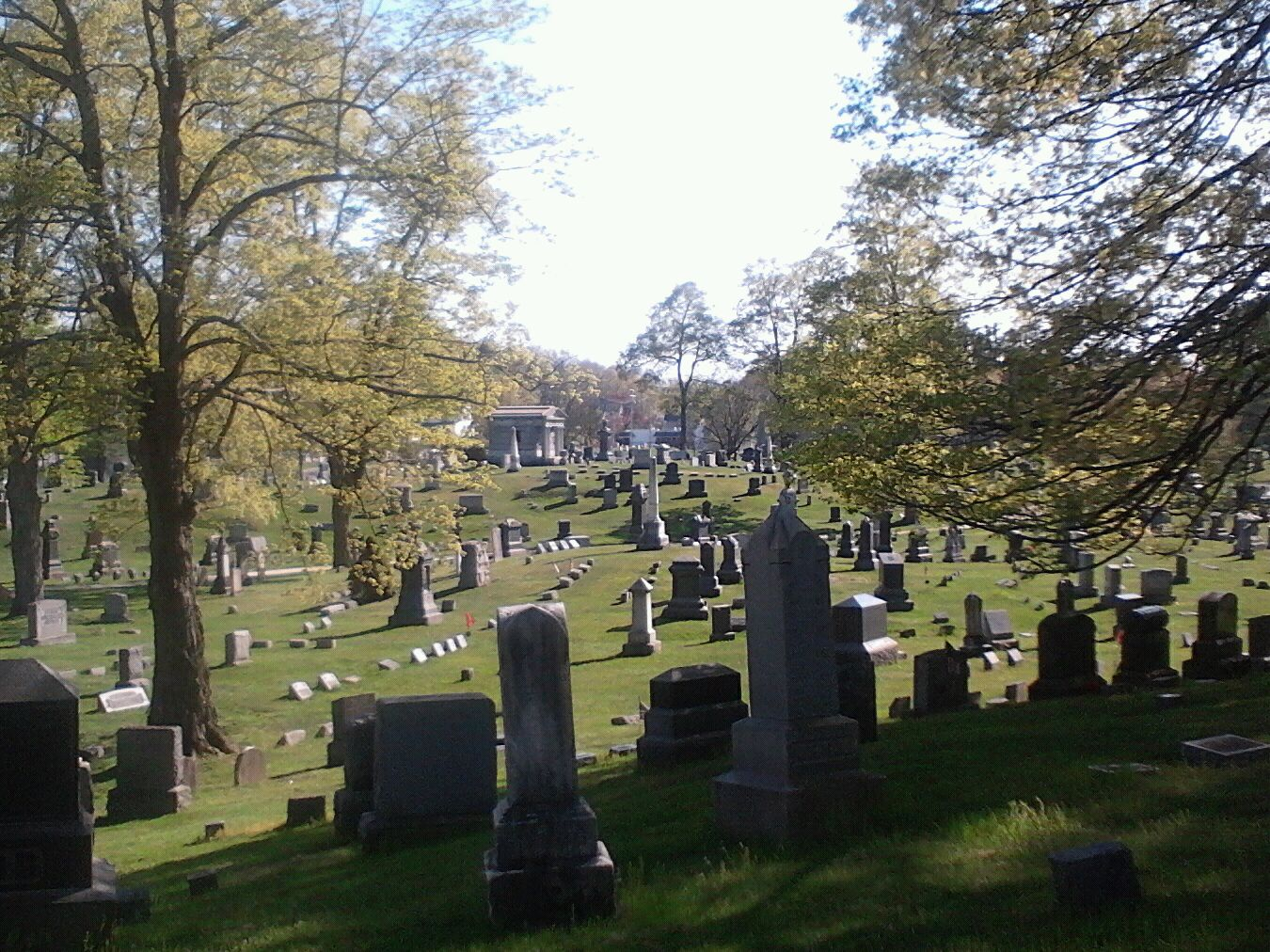
Looking south toward Henry C. Kelsey mausoleum, May 2013

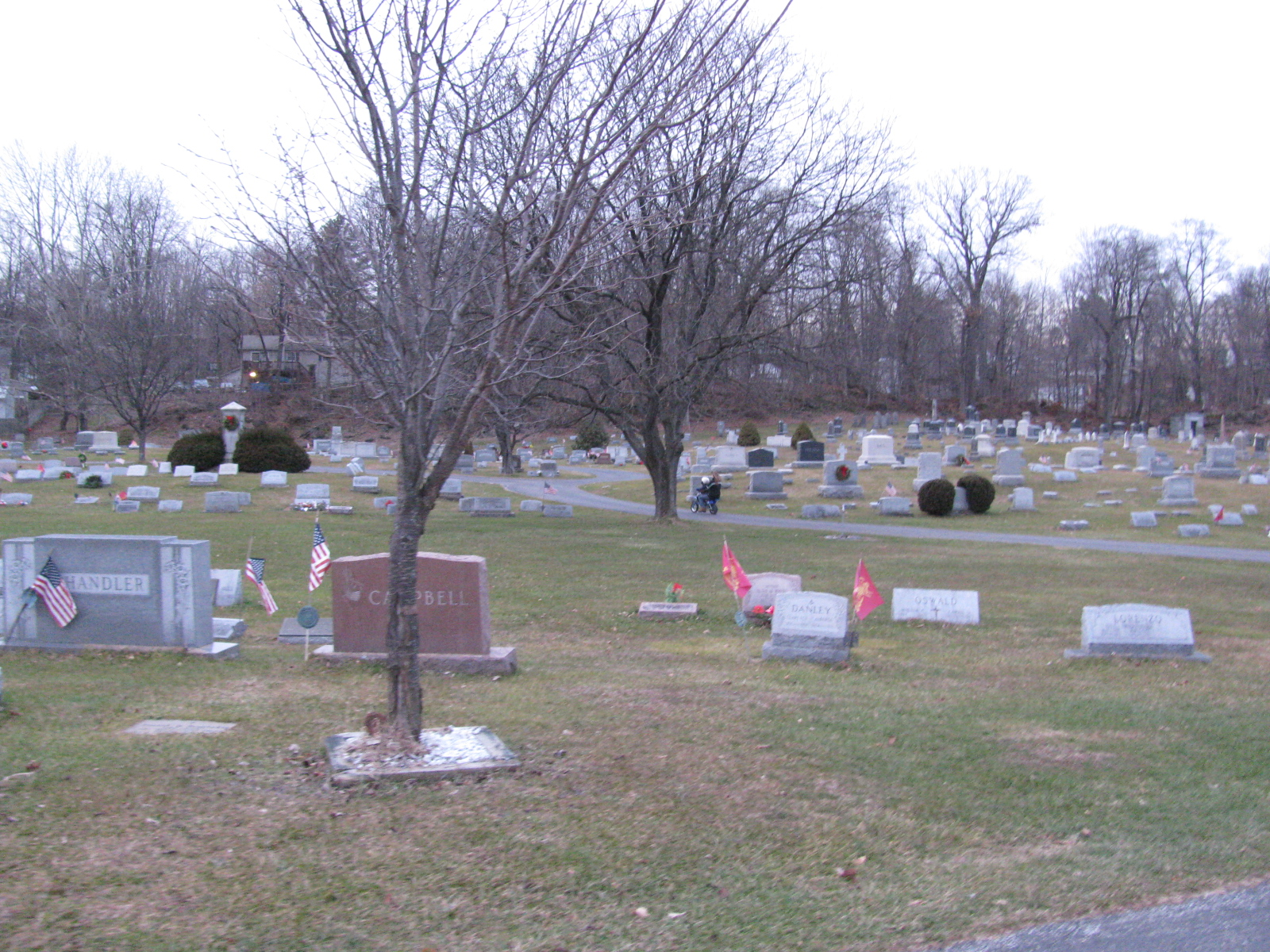
Looking north, December 2011

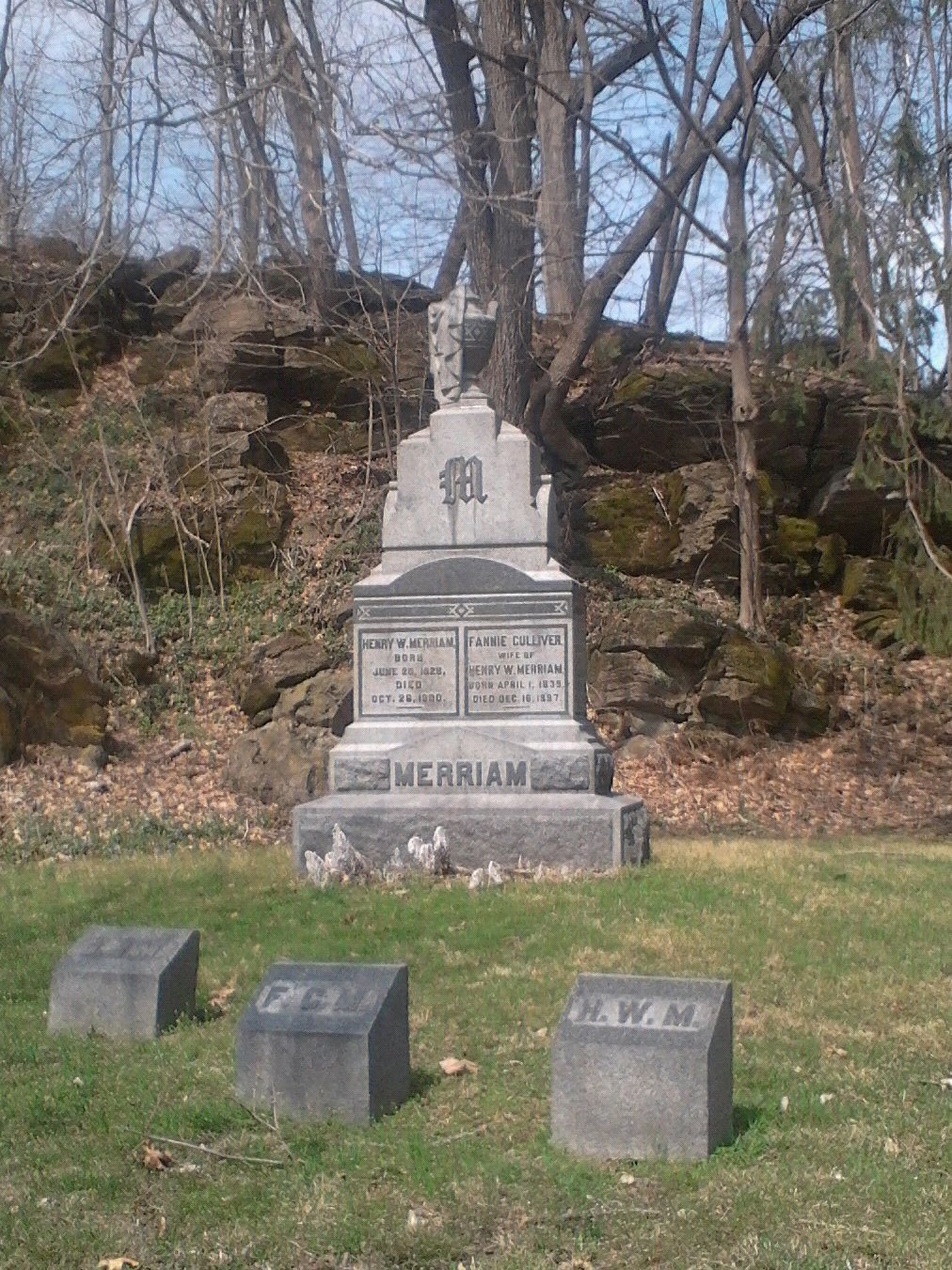
Gravestone for industrialist and philanthropist Henry W. Merriam (1828-1900) and wife, Frances (1839-1897)

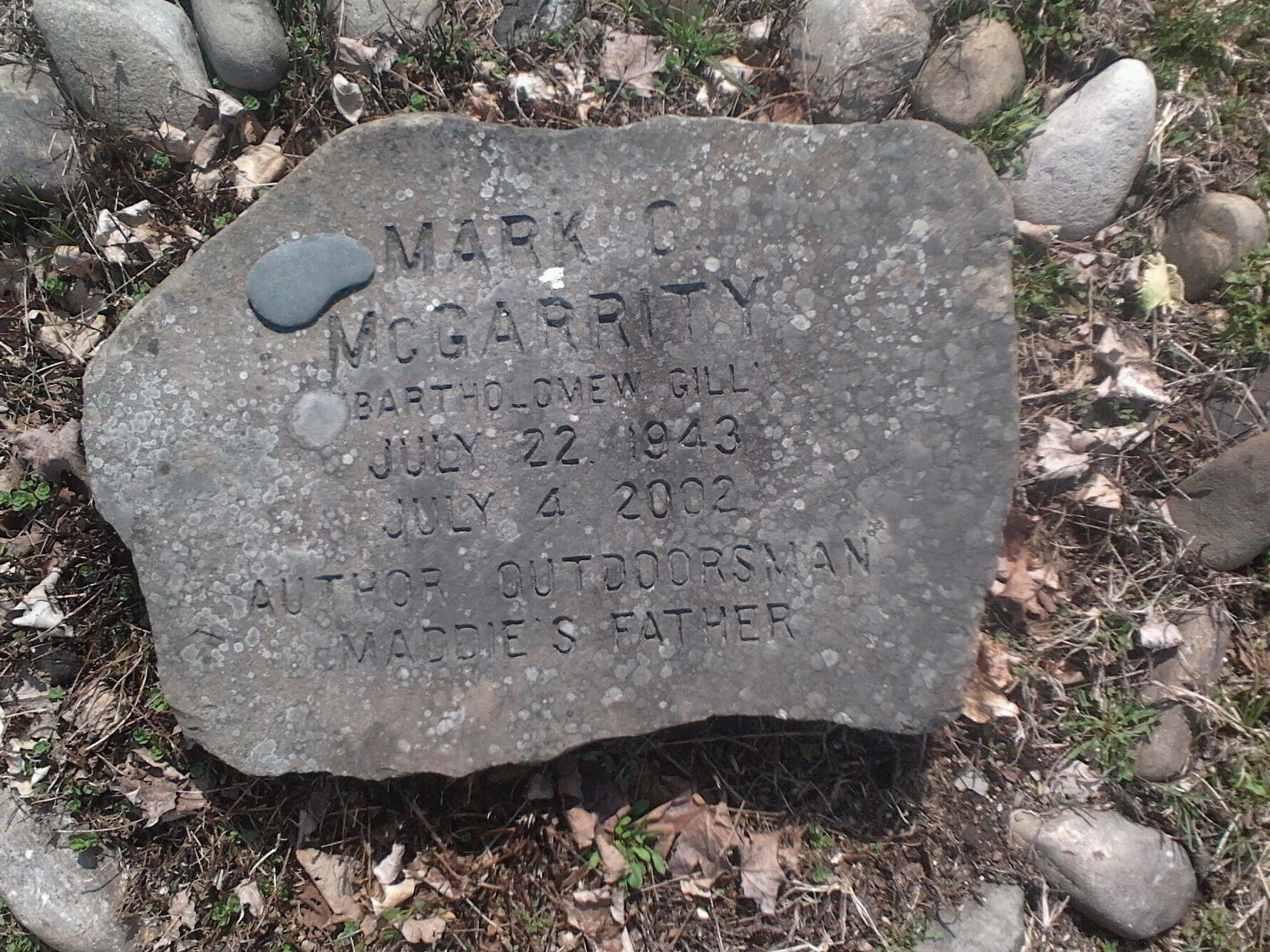
Gravestone for Mark McGarrity (aka Bartholomew Gill), crime fiction writer

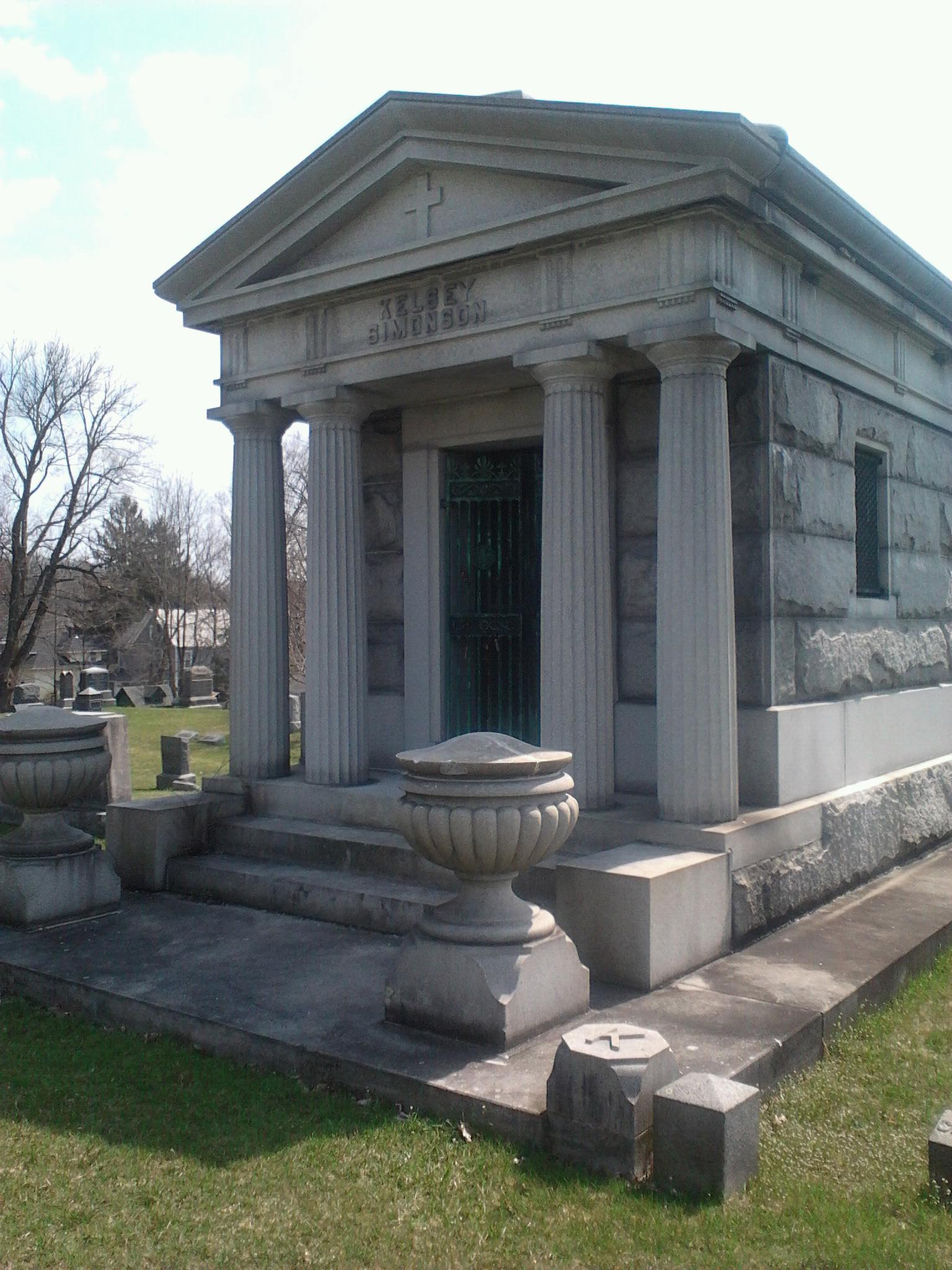
Mausoleum for Henry C. Kelsey, former New Jersey Secretary of State, leader of "Kelsey Ring"
