= List of municipalities in Sussex County, New Jersey =

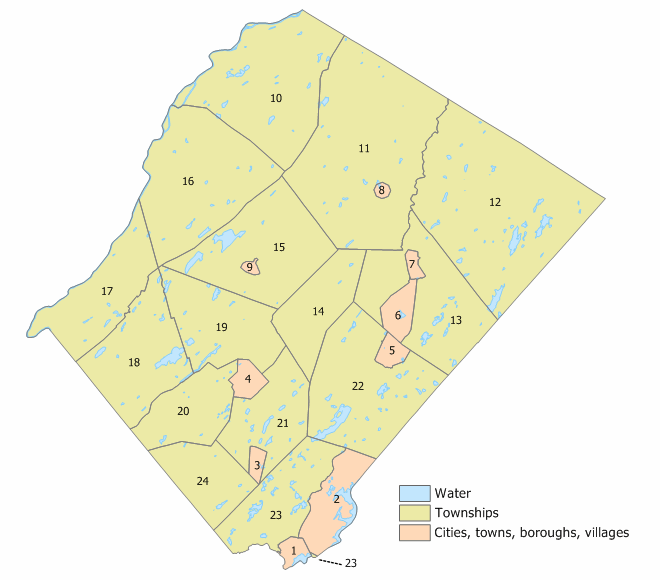
Index map of Sussex County municipalities (click to see index key)

There are twenty-four municipalities within the boundaries of Sussex County in the state of New Jersey. These include one municipality incorporated as a town, eight incorporated as boroughs, and fifteen incorporated as townships, organized in accordance with state law. In 2010 Federal decennial census, 149,265 persons resided in Sussex County, a gain of 3.5% from the 144,166 persons counted in the 2000 Federal decennial census. Populations, as of 2010, range from the county's largest municipality, Vernon Township, with 23,943 residents, to Walpack Township, with 16 residents. In size, municipalities range from Branchville borough, the smallest at 0.6 square miles (1.6 km^{2}) to the largest, Vernon, at 70.59 square miles (182.8 km^{2}).

When Sussex County was created on June 8, 1753 from the northern and western regions of Morris County it consisted of the land area of present-day Sussex County and Warren County (created in 1824) in northwestern New Jersey. That county, from 1753 to 1824, comprised roughly 898.60 square miles (2,327.4 km^{2}), (Note: This is figure is an addition of Sussex County's 535.74 square miles, and Warren County's 362.86 square miles, per United States Census Bureau data.) was bounded by the Delaware River, Musconetcong River, New York-New Jersey border, and a line drawn northeast from Lake Hopatcong to the colony's northern border with New York. In 1753, Sussex County consisted of four large "precincts": Walpack (created c. 1731), Greenwich (created c. 1738), Hardwick (created 1750), and Newtown (created 1751, dissolved 1864). These four precincts would be divided to create the 24 municipalities presently extant in Sussex County and 22 municipalities presently extant in Warren County.

By a legislative act on November 20, 1824, Warren County was created of the southern half of Sussex County divided on by partition line "beginning on the river Delaware, at the mouth of Flat brook, in the township of Walpack, and running from thence, a straight course to the corner of the Hardwick church [now in Yellow Frame], situated on the south side of the main road leading from Johnsonsburg to Newton and from thence in the same course to the middle of Muskonetcong creek". This line divided Hardwick Township with its lands north of the line being ceded to create the townships of Green and Stillwater. The line also divided Walpack Township with the lands south of the line being ceded to create Pahaquarry Township in Warren County.

Another line of partition, the Lawrence Line of 1743, is still extant in the boundaries of four Sussex County municipalities. This line was drawn by surveyor John Lawrence to provide final resolution after 67 years of disputes to the division of New Jersey into the two proprietary colonies of the Province of West Jersey and Province of East Jersey in accordance with the Quintipartite Deed (1676), divided the state in a straight line from "the Northernmost Branch of said Bay or River of De la Ware which is in forty-one Degrees and forty minutes of latitude...unto the most southwardly poynt of the East syde of Little Egge Harbour". This line divides Walpack Township from Sandyston Township, and Stillwater Township from Hampton Township.

== List of municipalities ==
Municipality	Location	Type	Incorporated	Created from	Area	Population (2010)	Population (2000)	% change
Andover Borough	-	Borough	March 25, 1904 by legislative act	Andover Township	1.47 square miles (3.8 km^{2})	606	658	-7.9%
Andover Township		Township	April 11, 1864 by legislative act	Newton Township	20.68 square miles (53.6 km^{2})	6,319	6,033	+4.7%
Branchville Borough		Borough	March 9, 1898 by legislative act	Frankford Township	0.6 square miles (1.6 km^{2})	841	845	-0.5%
Byram Township		Township (council–manager)	April 9, 1798 by legislative act	Newton Township	22.26 square miles (57.7 km^{2})	8,350	8,254	+1.2%
Frankford Township		Township	April 10, 1797 by legislative act	Newton Township	35.44 square miles (91.8 km^{2})	5,565	5,420	+2.7%
Franklin Borough		Borough	April 23, 1913 by legislative act and referendum	Hardyston Township	4.57 square miles (11.8 km^{2})	5,045	5,160	-2.2%
Fredon Township		Township	February 24, 1904 by legislative act	from Andover, Green, Hampton and Stillwater townships	18.00 square miles (46.6 km^{2})	3,437	2,860	+20.2%
Green Township		Township	December 27, 1824 by legislative act	Hardwick and Independence townships	16.26 square miles (42.1 km^{2})	3,601	3,220	+11.8%
Hamburg Borough		Borough	April 24, 1920 by legislative act and referendum	Hardyston Township	1.165 square miles (3.02 km^{2})	3,277	3,105	+5.5%
Hampton Township		Township	April 11, 1864 by legislative act	Newton Township	25.30 square miles (65.5 km^{2})	5,196	4,943	+5.1%
Hardyston Township		Township (Special Charter)	February 25, 1762 by royal charter	Newton Township	32.64 square miles (84.5 km^{2})	8,213	6,171	+33.1%
Hopatcong Borough		Borough	March 24, 1898 by legislative act (Note: In 1898, Byram township ceded territory to create Brooklyn Borough which was renamed Hopatcong Borough on March 22, 1901.)	Byram Township	12.25 square miles (31.7 km^{2})	15,147	15,888	-4.7%
Lafayette Township		Township	April 14, 1845 by legislative act	Frankford and Newton townships	18.05 square miles (46.7 km^{2})	2,538	2,300	+10.3%
Montague Township		Township	March 26, 1759 by colonial county courts	Walpack Township	45.38 square miles (117.5 km^{2})	3,847	3,412	+12.7%
Newton		Town (council–manager)	April 11, 1864 by legislative act	Newton Township (Note: Newton Township was dissolved after its final division into Newton (town), Andover Township, and Hampton Township in 1864.)	3.17 square miles (8.2 km^{2})	7,997	8,244	-30%
Ogdensburg Borough		Borough	March 31, 1914 by legislative act and referendum	Sparta Township	2.33 square miles (6.0 km^{2})	2,410	2,638	-8.6%
Sandyston Township		Township	February 26, 1762 by royal charter	Walpack Township	43.26 square miles (112.0 km^{2})	1,998	1,825	+9.5%
Sparta Township		Township (council–manager)	April 14, 1845 by legislative act	Byram, Frankford, Hardyston, and Newton townships	38.97 square miles (100.9 km^{2})	19,722	18,080	+9.1%
Stanhope Borough		Borough	March 24, 1904 by legislative act	Byram Township	2.19 square miles (5.7 km^{2})	3,610	3,584	+0.7%
Stillwater Township		Township	December 27, 1824 by legislative act	Hardwick Township	28.39 square miles (73.5 km^{2})	4,099	4,267	-3.9%
Sussex Borough		Borough	October 14, 1891 by referendum (Note: Wantage Township ceded territory to create Deckertown borough after a public referendum on October 14, 1891. It was renamed Sussex Borough after a referendum on March 2, 1902.)	Wantage Township	0.62 square miles (1.6 km^{2})	2,130	2,145	-0.7%
Vernon Township		Township (council–manager)	April 8, 1793 by legislative act	Hardyston Township	70.59 square miles (182.8 km^{2})	23,943	24,686	-3.0%
Walpack Township		Township	c. 1731 (Note: Walpack Precinct's date of creation or instrument of creation is unknown. The earliest mention was as "Walpake" in colonial court and government records dated October 26, 1731.)	unincorporated wilderness	24.70 square miles (64.0 km^{2})	16	41	-61.0%
Wantage Township		Township	May 30, 1754 by colonial county courts	Newton Township	67.48 square miles (174.8 km^{2})	11,358	10.387	+9.3%

== Defunct municipalities ==
Municipality	Location	Incorporated	Dissolved	Area	Notes
Newton Township	-	March 27, 1751 by colonial county courts	April 11, 1864 by division	approx. 360 square miles (930 km^{2}) (Note: Newton Township, at its creation in 1751, encompassed an area of all of present-day Sussex County excluding Montague, Sandyston, Walpack, Stillwater, Fredon and Green township--presently 176 square miles (460 km^{2}). The calculation of the 360 square miles (930 km^{2}) figure is approximate as, in 1904, a small tract of land of unknown size in Hampton and Andover township, previously part of old Newton Township, was ceded at the creation of Fredon Township. The actual figure might be slightly, but not substantially, larger when factoring in this unknown quantity.)	Created by the colonial courts in Morris County from New Jersey's last unorganized wilderness areas; one of original four precincts ceded to create Sussex County in 1753. From 1754 to 1864 was divided on six occasions to create 9 municipalities (direct and indirect parent of 18 of Sussex County's present-day 24 municipalities). Dissolved after its final division in 1864 into the Town of Newton, Andover Township, and Hampton Township.

== See also ==
- List of census-designated places in New Jersey
- List of municipalities in New Jersey
