= Ross Corner, New Jersey =

Populated place in Sussex County, New Jersey, US

- Census-designated place
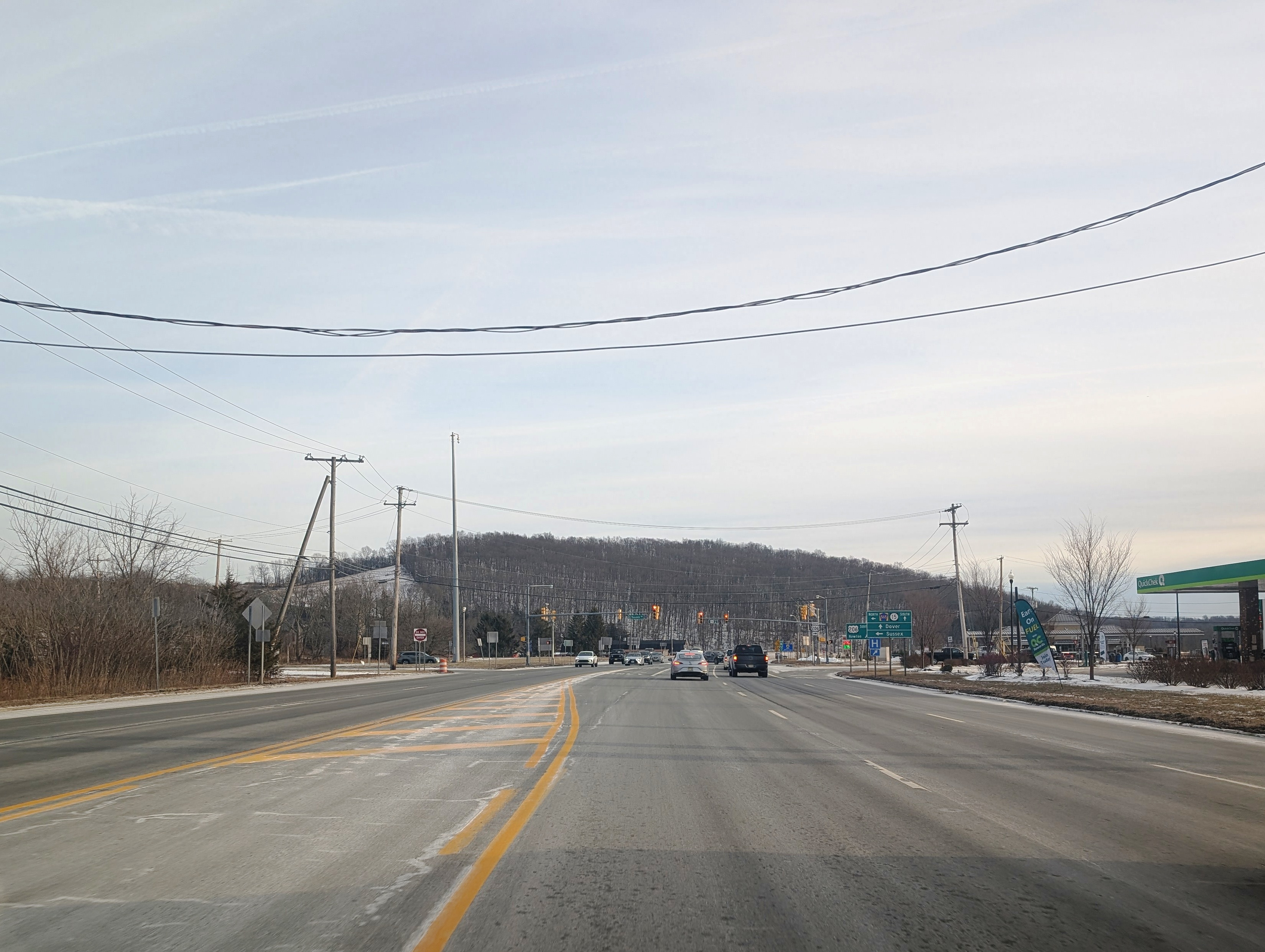
- US 206 southbound approaching Route 15 and CR 565 in Ross Corner

- Location in Sussex County Location in New Jersey Location in the United States
- Coordinates: 41.127527°N 74.713356°W
- Country: United States
- State: New Jersey
- County: Sussex
- Township: Frankford

Area
  - Total: 1.79 sq mi (4.63 km^{2})
  - Land: 1.78 sq mi (4.61 km^{2})
  - Water: 0.0077 sq mi (0.02 km^{2}) 0.55%
- Elevation: 531 ft (162 m)

Population (2020)
  - Total: 120
  - Density: 67.4/sq mi (26.04/km^{2})
- Time zone: UTC−05:00 (Eastern (EST))
  - Summer (DST): UTC−04:00 (Eastern (EDT))
- Area codes: 862/973
- FIPS code: 34-64860
- GNIS feature ID: 02584024

Ross Corner is an unincorporated community and census-designated place (CDP) located in Frankford Township, in Sussex County, in the U.S. state of New Jersey. As of the 2020 census, Ross Corner had a population of 120.

== Geography ==
According to the United States Census Bureau, Ross Corner had a total area of 0.495 square miles (1.281 km^{2}), including 0.492 square miles (1.274 km^{2}) of land and 0.003 square miles (0.007 km^{2}) of water (0.55%).

== Demographics ==
Historical population
Census	Pop.	Note	%±
2010	13		—
2020	120		823.1%
Population sources: 2010

Ross Corner first appeared as a census designated place in the 2010 U.S. census.

Ross Corner CDP, New Jersey – Racial and ethnic composition Note: the US Census treats Hispanic/Latino as an ethnic category. This table excludes Latinos from the racial categories and assigns them to a separate category. Hispanics/Latinos may be of any race.
Race / Ethnicity (NH = Non-Hispanic)	Pop 2010	Pop 2020	% 2010	% 2020
White alone (NH)	13	90	100.00%	75.00%
Black or African American alone (NH)	0	1	0.00%	0.83%
Native American or Alaska Native alone (NH)	0	0	0.00%	0.00%
Asian alone (NH)	0	1	0.00%	0.83%
Native Hawaiian or Pacific Islander alone (NH)	0	0	0.00%	0.00%
Other race alone (NH)	0	4	0.00%	3.33%
Mixed race or Multiracial (NH)	0	8	0.00%	6.67%
Hispanic or Latino (any race)	0	16	0.00%	13.33%
Total	13	120	100.00%	100.00%

=== 2010 census ===
The 2010 United States census counted 13 people, 5 households, and 5 families in the CDP. The population density was 26.4 per square mile (10.2/km^{2}). There were 7 housing units at an average density of 14.2 per square mile (5.5/km^{2}). The racial makeup was 100.00% (13) White, 0.00% (0) Black or African American, 0.00% (0) Native American, 0.00% (0) Asian, 0.00% (0) Pacific Islander, 0.00% (0) from other races, and 0.00% (0) from two or more races. Hispanic or Latino of any race were 0.00% (0) of the population.

Of the 5 households, 20.0% had children under the age of 18; 80.0% were married couples living together; 20.0% had a female householder with no husband present and 0.0% were non-families. Of all households, 0.0% were made up of individuals and 0.0% had someone living alone who was 65 years of age or older. The average household size was 2.60 and the average family size was 2.40.

7.7% of the population were under the age of 18, 0.0% from 18 to 24, 0.0% from 25 to 44, 46.2% from 45 to 64, and 46.2% who were 65 years of age or older. The median age was 64.5 years. For every 100 females, the population had 116.7 males. For every 100 females ages 18 and older there were 140.0 males.

== See also ==
- New Jersey Route 15
- U.S. Route 206
- County Route 565
