= Lafayette Township School District =

School district in Sussex County, New Jersey, US

Address
- 178 Beaver Run Road Lafayette Township, Sussex County, New Jersey, 07848; United States
- Coordinates: 41.132648°N 74.654091°W

District information
- Grades: PreK-8
- Superintendent: Michael Gall
- Business administrator: Erin Siipola
- Schools: 1

Students and staff
- Enrollment: 209 (as of 2022–23)
- Faculty: 23.9 FTEs
- Student–teacher ratio: 8.8:1

Other information
- District Factor Group: GH
- Website: www.ltes.org
Ind.	Per pupil	District spending	Rank (*)	K-8 average	%± vs. average
1A	Total Spending	$21,286	50	$18,891	12.7%
1	Budgetary Cost	14,713	31	14,159	3.9%
2	Classroom Instruction	8,795	28	8,659	1.6%
6	Support Services	2,095	24	2,167	−3.3%
8	Administrative Cost	1,886	63	1,547	21.9%
10	Operations & Maintenance	1,760	36	1,612	9.2%
13	Extracurricular Activities	162	38	104	55.8%
16	Median Teacher Salary	58,290	37	61,136
Data from NJDoE 2014 Taxpayers' Guide to Education Spending. *Of K-8 districts with up to 400 students. Lowest spending=1; Highest=71

The Lafayette Township School District is a comprehensive community public school district that serves students in kindergarten through eighth grade from Lafayette Township, in Sussex County, in the U.S. state of New Jersey.

As of the 2022–23 school year, the district, comprised of one school, had an enrollment of 209 students and 23.9 classroom teachers (on an FTE basis), for a student–teacher ratio of 8.8:1.

The district is classified by the New Jersey Department of Education as being in District Factor Group "GH", the third-highest of eight groupings. District Factor Groups organize districts statewide to allow comparison by common socioeconomic characteristics of the local districts. From lowest socioeconomic status to highest, the categories are A, B, CD, DE, FG, GH, I and J.

For ninth through twelfth grades, public school students attend High Point Regional High School, which also serves students from Branchville, Frankford Township, Montague Township, Sussex Borough and Wantage Township (where the school is located). As of the 2022–23 school year, the high school had an enrollment of 817 students and 68.4 classroom teachers (on an FTE basis), for a student–teacher ratio of 11.9:1.

== Schools ==
Schools in the district (with 2022–23 enrollment data from the National Center for Education Statistics) are:

Elementary schools

- Lafayette Township Elementary School with 205 students in grades PreK-8
  - Gerard Fazzio, principal

== Administration ==
Core members of the district's administration are:

- Michael Gall, superintendent
- Erin Siipola, business administrator and board secretary

== Board of education ==
The district's board of education, comprised of nine members, sets policy and oversees the fiscal and educational operation of the district through its administration. As a Type II school district, the board's trustees are elected directly by voters to serve three-year terms of office on a staggered basis, with three seats up for election each year held (since 2012) as part of the November general election. The board appoints a superintendent to oversee the district's day-to-day operations and a business administrator to supervise the business functions of the district.
