= Frankford Township School District =

Public school district in Sussex County, New Jersey, US

Address
- 4 Pines Road Frankford Township, Sussex County, New Jersey, 07826; United States
- Coordinates: 41.137873°N 74.738007°W

District information
- Grades: PreK to 8
- Superintendent: Braden Hirsch
- Business administrator: Christopher Lessard
- Schools: 1

Students and staff
- Enrollment: 505 (as of 2022–23)
- Faculty: 56.5 FTEs
- Student–teacher ratio: 8.9:1

Other information
- District Factor Group: FG
- Website: www.frankfordschool.org
Ind.	Per pupil	District spending	Rank (*)	K-8 average	%± vs. average
1A	Total Spending	$21,661	54	$18,891	14.7%
1	Budgetary Cost	17,221	56	14,159	21.6%
2	Classroom Instruction	11,574	62	8,659	33.7%
6	Support Services	1,949	20	2,167	−10.1%
8	Administrative Cost	1,787	41	1,547	15.5%
10	Operations & Maintenance	1,690	41	1,612	4.8%
13	Extracurricular Activities	162	41	104	55.8%
16	Median Teacher Salary	72,905	60	61,136
Data from NJDoE 2014 Taxpayers' Guide to Education Spending. *Of K-8 districts with 401-750 students. Lowest spending=1; Highest=64

The Frankford Township School District is a comprehensive community public school district that serves students in pre-kindergarten through eighth grade from Frankford Township, in Sussex County, in the U.S. state of New Jersey. Students from Branchville attend the district's school as part of a sending/receiving relationship.

As of the 2022–23 school year, the district, comprising one school, had an enrollment of 505 students and 56.5 classroom teachers (on an FTE basis), for a student–teacher ratio of 8.9:1.

The district is classified by the New Jersey Department of Education as being in District Factor Group "FG", the fourth-highest of eight groupings. District Factor Groups organize districts statewide to allow comparison by common socioeconomic characteristics of the local districts. From lowest socioeconomic status to highest, the categories are A, B, CD, DE, FG, GH, I and J.

For ninth through twelfth grades, public school students attend High Point Regional High School. Attending the school are students from Branchville, Frankford Township, Lafayette Township, Montague Township, Sussex Borough and from Wantage Township (where the school is located). As of the 2021–22 school year, the high school had an enrollment of 812 students and 72.8 classroom teachers (on an FTE basis), for a student–teacher ratio of 11.2:1.

== Schools ==
Frankford Township School had an enrollment of 503 students in 2021–22 in grades PreK-8 (based on data from the National Center for Education Statistics).

- Braden Hirsch, elementary school principal
- Amy Librizzi, middle school principal

== Administration ==
Core members of the district's administration are:

- Braden Hirsch, superintendent
- Christopher Lessard, business administrator and board secretary

== Board of education ==
The district's board of education is comprised of nine members who set policy and oversee the fiscal and educational operation of the district through its administration. As a Type II school district, the board's trustees are elected directly by voters to serve three-year terms of office on a staggered basis, with three seats up for election each year held (since 2012) as part of the November general election. The board appoints a superintendent to oversee the district's day-to-day operations and a business administrator to supervise the business functions of the district.
