= New Jersey Route 15 =

State highway in New Jersey, US

Route 15

Route information
- Maintained by NJDOT
- Length: 19.5 mi (31.4 km)
- Existed: January 1, 1953–present

Major junctions
- South end: US 46 / CR 661 in Dover
- I-80 in Wharton; Route 181 in Sparta; Route 94 in Lafayette Township
- North end: US 206 / CR 565 in Frankford Township

Location
- Country: United States
- State: New Jersey
- Counties: Morris, Sussex

Highway system
- New Jersey State Highway Routes; Interstate; US; State; Scenic Byways
← Route 14	→ Route 17

Route 15 is a state highway in New Jersey, spanning Morris and Sussex counties, which travels for 19 miles (31 km) from West MacFarland Street (U.S. Route 46) in Dover to an intersection of U.S. Route 206 and Sussex Road (CR 565) in Frankford Township. It becomes a divided highway in Wharton until becoming a freeway bypass near Sparta. Route 15 was originally Route 6A from 1927 until 1953, when a renumbering occurred and the route was given its current number. Since the finishing of the Sparta Bypass, the New Jersey Department of Transportation and North Jersey Transportation Planning Authority have considered more bypasses and alignment changes for Route 15.

== Route description ==
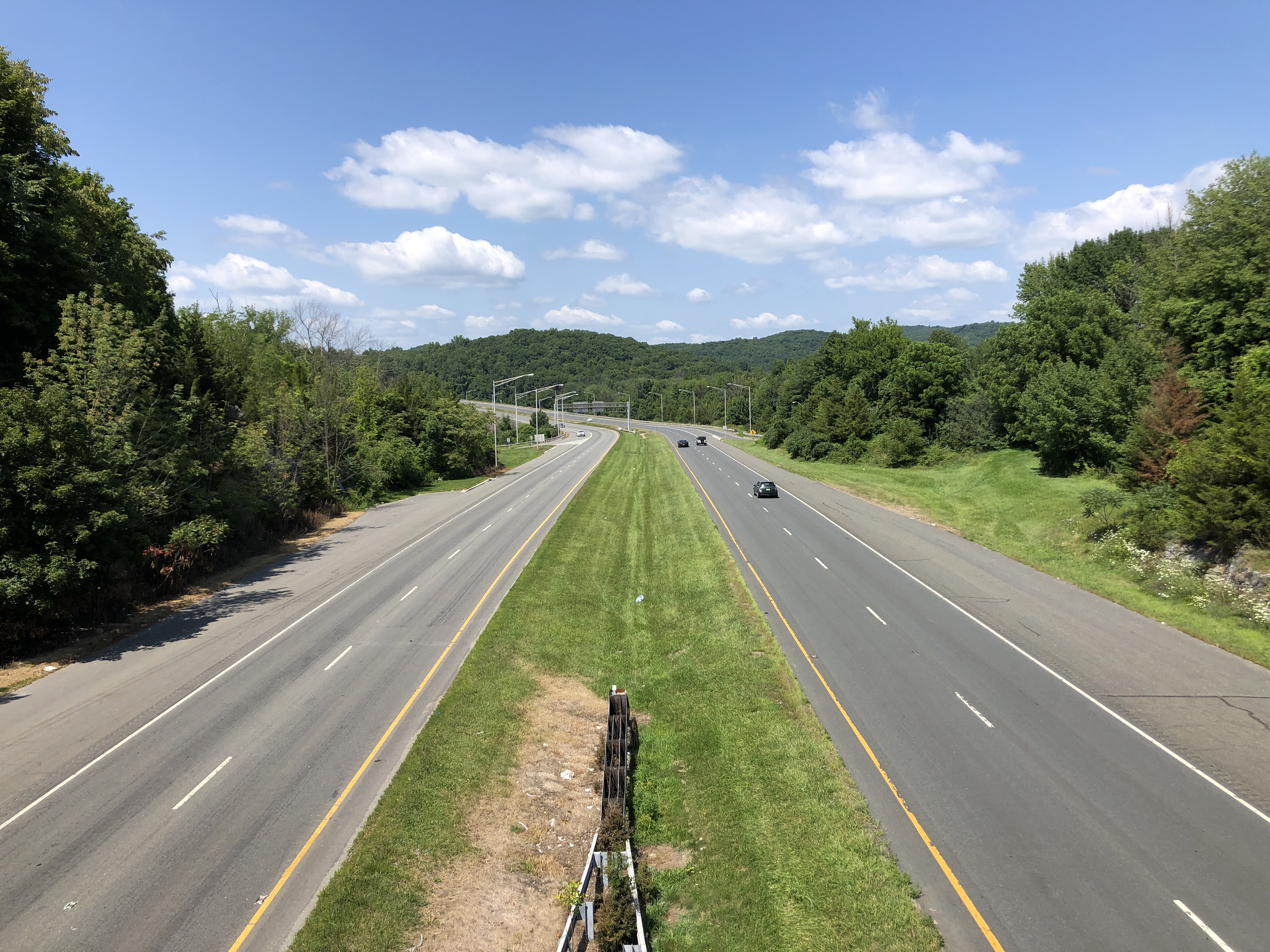
Route 15 northbound at CR 517 interchange in Sparta Township

Route 15 currently exists in two disconnected segments. The southern segment begins in Downtown Dover at an intersection with US 46 and Mount Hope Avenue (CR 661). It follows North Bergen Street south a short distance to East Clinton Street, then turns west along East Clinton Street through Downtown Dover. This segment, which is signed in Downtown Dover, was disconnected from the rest of the route when a new intersection between U.S. Route 46 and Route 15 was constructed just northwest of Downtown Dover. Route 15 formerly passed under U.S. Route 46 along the Dover and Rockaway River Railroad at the location of this new intersection. The southern segment ends at a dead end just southeast of the new intersection, with the northern segment of Route 15 starting again at U.S. Route 46 almost directly above the rail line.

From the new intersection with U.S. Route 46, Route 15 continues north on West Clinton Street, exiting Dover and entering Rockaway Township. The road remains two lanes past the turn for the Rockaway Townsquare shopping mall. For a very short distance Route 15 becomes a freeway as it crosses the interchange with Interstate 80. A mile north, the road becomes a four lane divided highway with exits for a few businesses and Picatinny Arsenal. At that point, Route 15 leaves Rockaway Township and enters Jefferson Township. In Jefferson Township, the northbound and southbound lanes become about a quarter mile apart as it climbs up a steep mountain. The southbound lanes have businesses, easy access to them, and a speed limit of 40 miles per hour (64 km/h) as these were the original lanes of Route 15 when it was only a two lane highway. The northbound lanes are nearly a freeway with limited access to businesses on the southbound lanes. The northbound lanes have a speed limit of 50 mph as well. These two lanes were built in the late 1960s. Slightly farther north, Route 15 becomes a freeway and the northbound and southbound lanes come closer together. At this point, the original two-lane Route 15 breaks off into Route 181, heading through Jefferson Township and into Downtown Sparta. Several miles north, the freeway leaves Jefferson Township in Morris County and enters Sparta in Sussex County, bypassing Downtown Sparta. After bypassing Downtown Sparta, Route 181 ends and merges onto Route 15. The freeway ends and Route 15 becomes a two-lane road before crossing the New York, Susquehanna and Western Railway at grade crossing. After Route 15 leaves Sparta and enters Lafayette Township, it merges with Route 94. Routes 15 and 94 run as a concurrency until Route 94 turns off to the southeast while Route 15 heads northwest. It continues into Frankford Township and comes to an end at the intersection of U.S. Route 206 and Sussex Road (CR 565).

== History ==
Route 6A
- Location: Dover–Frankford Township
- Existed: 1927–1953

Route 15 follows the course of an old Lenape trail running from what is now Ross Corner to Dover. In 1804, this road was legislated as a part of the Union Turnpike, which ran from Morristown north. In 1938, Route 15 was designated as State Highway Route 6A. In the 1953 renumbering, the current designation was assigned. Originally, Route 15 was a two-lane road for its entire length. The road originally went through Downtown Sparta and today that road is known as Route 181. In the mid-1960s, plans were made to widen Route 15 to four lanes through Jefferson Township. However, businesses were on both sides of this road, thus making a widening difficult. As a result, the additional two lanes were built behind the businesses on the east side of the road. In 1974, a freeway bypass was built around the Sparta Business District and into Jefferson Township. The freeway began in northern Sparta and extended to Lake Hopatcong.

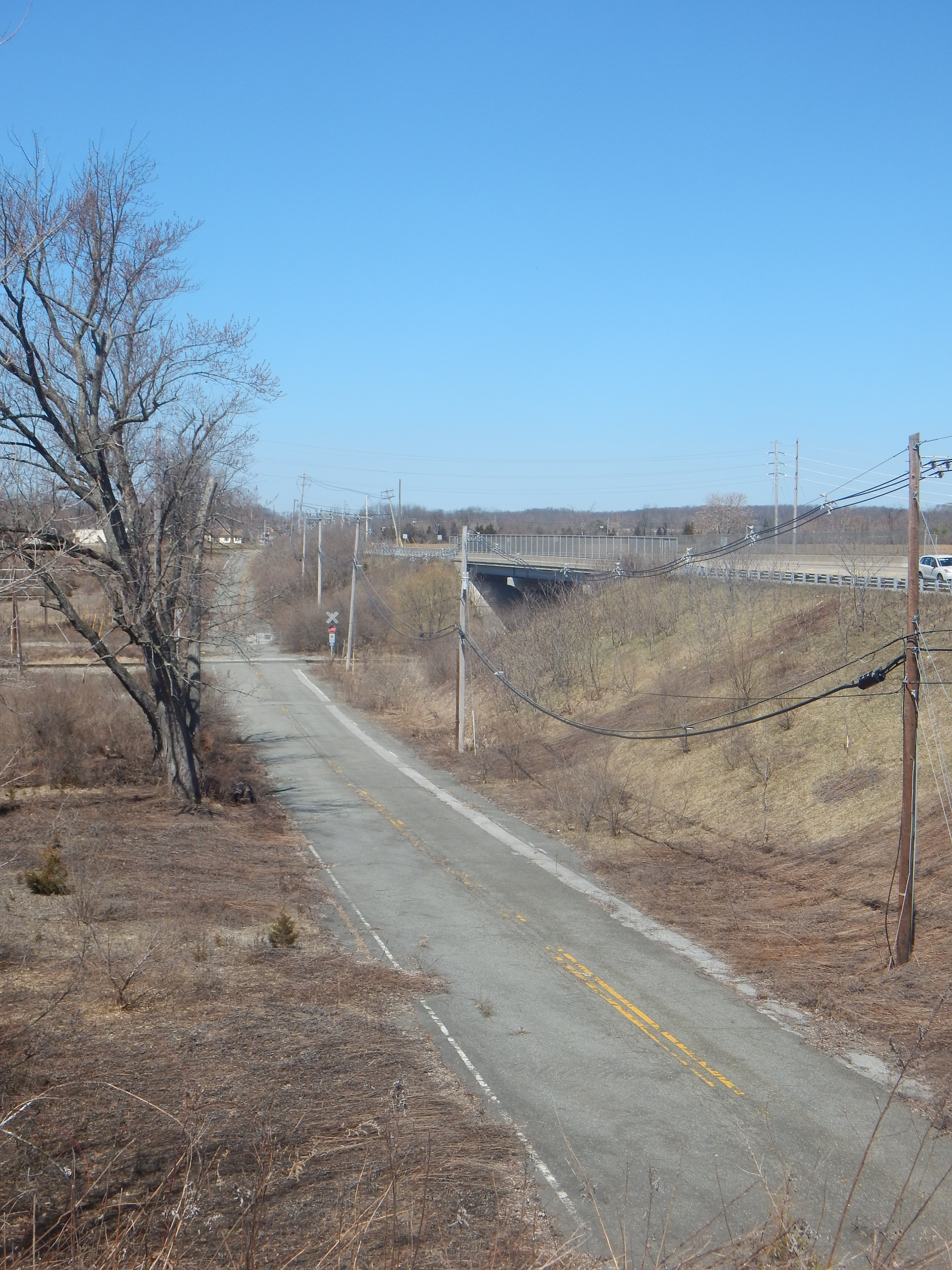
Route 15's former and current alignment over the Lehigh and Hudson River Railway alignment in Woodruffs Gap

In 2004, State Department of Transportation Commissioner Jack Lettire and state Senator Robert Littell announced the completion of a project of restructuring the Route 15-Houses Corner Road intersection, which broke ground in 2002 at the hand of then-governor James E. McGreevey. The original intersection was a signalized intersection with a blinking light and no left turn-off lanes from Route 15. Because of heavy traffic, turning left onto Houses Corner Road became dangerous for motorists. The intersection now has a full traffic light. The project cost a total of $15.5 million.

Wilson Drive and White Lake Road were also realigned to form one signalized intersection, with completion originally expected in 2008. The intersection was improved, with construction finishing on June 1, 2009, after eight months of work starting in October 2008. The project cost the state $2.3 million to fund for construction by the North Jersey Transportation Planning Authority. Studies are being made to improve the Route 15 corridor from Interstate 80 to U.S. Route 206. Concepts include widening, the addition of climbing lanes, and a potential bypass of Lafayette Township.

The project to construct a new intersection at US 46 in Dover began in 2008; the project also entailed the replacement of bridges on US 46 over the Morristown and Erie Railway (now Dover and Rockaway River Railroad) and the Rockaway River. A temporary intersection was completed in January 2010 utilizing a former US 46 westbound–Route 15 northbound ramp. The permanent intersection was completed in August 2011.

In February 2012, a bill was introduced in the New Jersey General Assembly by Michael Patrick Carroll, Gary R. Chiusano, Alison Littell McHose and Jay Webber to designate Route 15 as the "Ronald Reagan Memorial Highway" to honor U.S. President Ronald Reagan.

== Major intersections ==
County	Location	mi	km	Destinations	Notes
Morris	Dover	0.0	0.0	US 46 (E McFarlan St) CR 661 (Mt Hope Ave) to I-80	Southern terminus of Route 15
Morris	Dover	0.3	0.48	Dead end	
Morris	Dover	0.0-mile (0 km) gap in route			
Morris	Dover	0.3	0.48	US 46 (W McFarland St) – Clifton, Lake Hopatcong	
Morris	Wharton	2.0	3.2	I-80 – Netcong, Del Water Gap, Denville, Paterson, New York City	Exit 34 eastbound and exits 34A-B westbound (I-80); no northbound access to I-80 west
Morris	Wharton	2.5	4.0	N Main St	Interchange; no northbound exit; access via CR 634
Morris	Rockaway Township	2.5	4.0	Mt Hope, Lake Denmark	Interchange; southbound entrance via U-turn
Morris	Rockaway Township	2.6	4.2	Picatinny Arsenal	Interchange
Morris	Jefferson Township	6.6	10.6	Lake Shawnee	Northbound exit only
Morris	Jefferson Township	6.9	11.1	Route 181 north / Weldon Rd – Lake Forest, Woodport, Milton, Oak Ridge, Lake Hopatcong North Shore	Interchange; south end of the freeway; southern terminus of Route 181
Sussex	Sparta	10.3	16.6	Route 181 – Sparta, Lake Mohawk Business Dist	
Sussex	Sparta	12.5	20.1	CR 517 – Sparta, Franklin	
Sussex	Sparta	14.1	22.7	Route 181 south (Woodport Rd) – Sparta, Lake Mohawk Business Dist	Northern end of the freeway section; northern terminus of Route 181
Sussex	Lafayette Township	16.6	26.7	Route 94 north – Franklin, Hamburg, Vernon CR 623 south (Sunset Inn Rd)	Southern end of the concurrency with Route 94 Northern terminus of CR 623
Sussex	Lafayette Township	16.8	27.0	Route 94 south – Newton	Northern end of the concurrency with Route 94
Sussex	Frankford Township	19.5	31.4	US 206 – Branchville, Milford, Newton CR 565 north (Sussex Rd) – Sussex, Airport	Northern terminus of Route 15 Southern terminus of CR 565
1.000 mi = 1.609 km; 1.000 km = 0.621 mi: Concurrency terminus; Incomplete access
