= County Route 565 (New Jersey) =

County highway in New Jersey, U.S.

County Route 565
- CR 565 highlighted in red

Route information
- Length: 17.86 mi (28.74 km)

Major junctions
- South end: US 206 / Route 15 in Frankford Township
- Route 23 in Wantage Township
- North end: CR 517 in Vernon Township

Location
- Country: United States
- State: New Jersey
- Counties: Sussex

Highway system
- County routes in New Jersey; 500-series routes
← CR 563	→ CR 567

County Route 565 (CR 565) is a county highway in the U.S. state of New Jersey. The highway extends 17.86 miles (28.74 km) from U.S. Route 206 / Route 15 in Frankford Township to McAfee Glenwood Road (CR 517) in Vernon Township.

== Route description ==
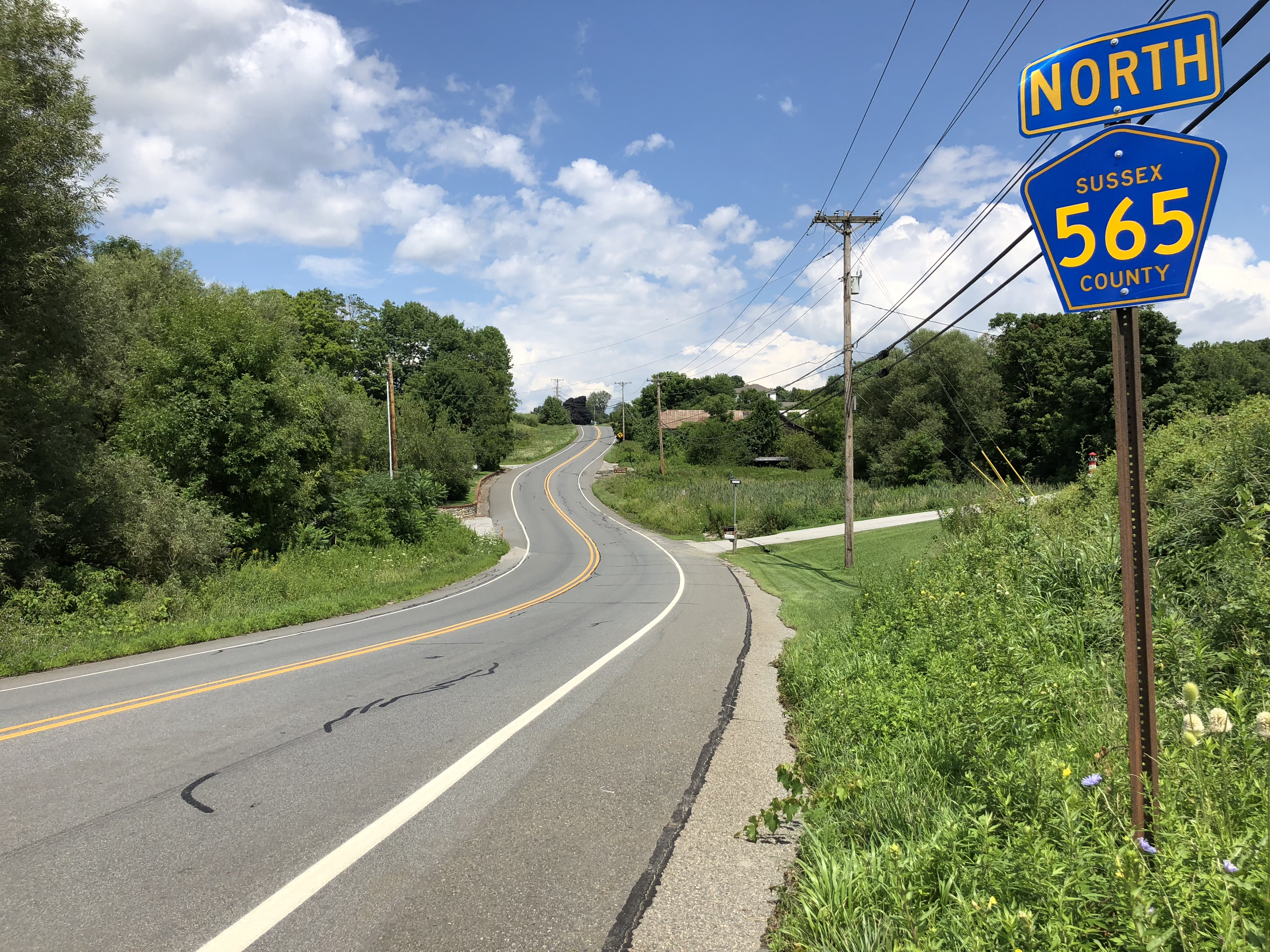
View north along CR 565 at Lake Pochung Road in Vernon Township

CR 565 begins at an intersection with US 206 and the northern terminus of Route 15 in Frankford Township, heading northeast on two-lane undivided Ross Corner-Sussex Road. The road runs through hilly areas of woods and farms with a few homes, continuing into Wantage Township. Here, the route intersects CR 637 before reaching a junction with CR 628. At this point, CR 565 turns southeast onto Compton Road while CR 628 continues northeast on Ross Corner-Sussex Road. The route turns northeast onto Lewisburg Road and reaches an intersection with Route 23. CR 565 turns east to form a concurrency with Route 23 on a three-lane road with a center left-turn lane, passing a few businesses. Upon splitting from Route 23, CR 565 heads east on two-lane undivided Glenwood Road. The road makes a turn northeast into Vernon Township and intersects CR 667 and CR 641. In Vernon Township, CR 565 serves as a mountain pass between the summit of Pochuck Mountain and the ridge's lesser peak Glenwood Mountain. This stretch of roadway passes through areas of woods and residential neighborhoods and crosses the Appalachian Trail. The route reaches its northern terminus at CR 517 in the northern part of Vernon Township a short distance south of the New York border.

== History ==
A spur route, County Route 565 Spur, existed, which is now Sussex County Route 628.

== Major intersections ==
The entire route is in Sussex County.

Location	mi	km	Destinations	Notes
Frankford Township	0.00	0.00	US 206 / Route 15 south – Newton, Branchville, Milford, Dover	Southern terminus; northern terminus of Route 15
Wantage Township	9.40	15.13	Route 23 north – Sussex	Southern end of Route 23 concurrency
Wantage Township	10.07	16.21	Route 23 south – Hamburg	Northern end of Route 23 concurrency
Vernon Township	17.86	28.74	CR 517 (McAfee Glenwood Road)	Northern terminus
1.000 mi = 1.609 km; 1.000 km = 0.621 mi: Concurrency terminus
