= Newton Township, Sussex County, New Jersey =

Coordinates: 41.042°N 74.741°W

Newton Township (formerly the Newtown Precinct and Newtown Township) is a defunct township that was located in Sussex County, in northwestern New Jersey, in the United States. The township was established as a precinct in 1751, the township is first mentioned in a description of its boundaries in the sessions of the Court of Common Pleas in Morris County. Before the establishment of Sussex County on 8 June 1753, Morris County controlled the sparsely populated areas in the northwestern corner of New Jersey and spanned the territory of three present-day New Jersey counties: Morris, Sussex, and Warren. After ceding territory on several occasions new municipalities were created, Newton Township ceased to exist on 11 April 1864.

The Newtown Precinct, after some divisions, was incorporated as one of New Jersey's initial 104 townships by an act by the New Jersey General Assembly on 21 February 1798.

== Boundaries and divisions ==
=== Original boundaries, 1751 ===
The boundaries of Newtown Township at its creation were, as follows:

Therefore We humbly pray that we may be erected into a Township or Precinct as followeth, Beginning at Musconetriunk where the Quintipetite Line crosses said Musconetriunk Thence running up Musconetriunk to the great Pond to the North west Corner thereof from thence a North east point to the [New] York Line Then Northerly by York Line till they come to the foot of Pequale Mountain Thence SouthWesterly along the foot of said Mountain till it meet with the aforesaid Quintipolite Line Thence along said line to the place where it began. To be called by the Name of New Town.

The Quintipartite Line referenced in this description is the boundary line agreed upon in the 1675 agreement to divide the proprietary colonies of East Jersey and West Jersey. After several attempts to survey this boundary, it was accurately drawn in 1743 as the Lawrence Line. Today this line exists in as the boundary between Stillwater and Hampton Townships—Hampton Township being part of the original territory of Newtown Township. Pequale Mountain is a references to Pahaqualong Mountain, and old name for Kittatinny Mountain. Great Pond refers to Lake Hopatcong and Musconetriunk is the Musconetcong River.

=== Municipalities formed from Newton Township ===
Portions of the township were taken to form Wantage Township (30 May 1754), Hardyston Township (25 February 1762), Frankford Township (10 April 1797), Byram Township (9 April 1798), Sparta Township (14 April 1845) and Lafayette Township (14 April 1845).

On 11 April 1864, the remaining portions of Newton Township were split up to create Andover Township, Hampton Township and Newton Town, at which point Newton Township was dissolved.

| Name of municipality | Date created | Created by | Boundaries | Notes |
|---|---|---|---|---|
| Wantage Township | 30 May 1754 | Sussex County Court of Common Pleas | - | Deckertown borough created in from Wantage in 1891, renamed to Sussex borough in 1902. |
| Hardyston Township | 25 February 1762 | Royal Charter | - | Hardyston divided to create Vernon Township in 1792, ceded territory to create Sparta and Lafayette (1845), and later created Hamburg borough and Franklin borough |
| Frankford Township | 10 April 1797 | State legislature | - | Ceded territory to create Branchville borough |
| Byram Township | 9 April 1798 | State legislature | - | ceded territory to create Sparta Township (1845) and later Stanhope borough and Hopatcong borough |
| Sparta Township | 14 April 1845 | State legislature | - | ceded territory to create Ogdensburg borough |
| Lafayette Township | 14 April 1845 | State legislature | - | |
| Hampton Township | 11 April 1864 | State legislature | - | Newton Township ceased to exist |
| Andover Township | 11 April 1864 | State legislature | - | Newton Township ceased to exist |
| Town of Newton | 11 April 1864 | State legislature | - | Newton Township ceased to exist |
