= Lafayette Township, New Jersey =

Township in Sussex County, New Jersey, US

- Township
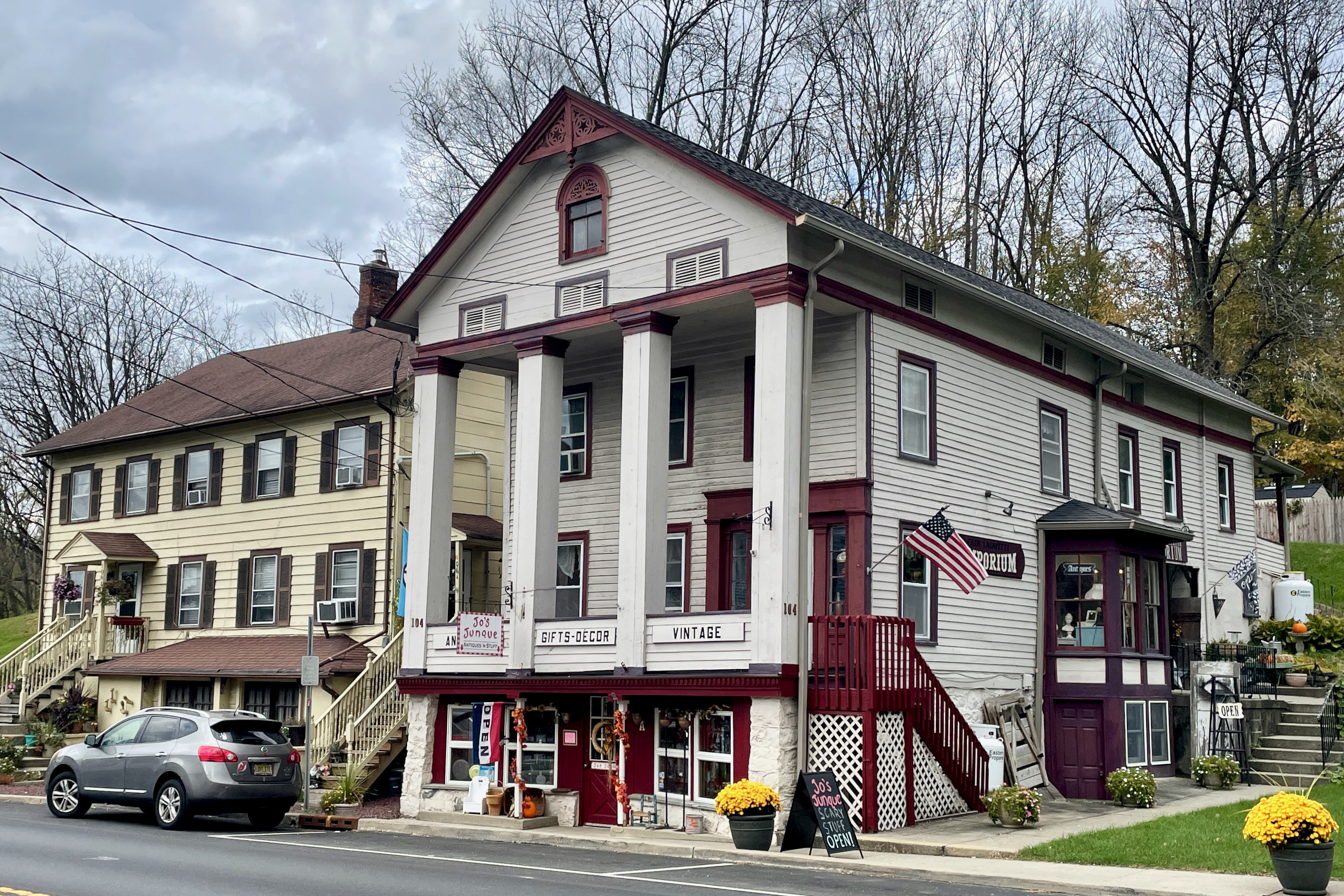
- Lafayette Village Historic District

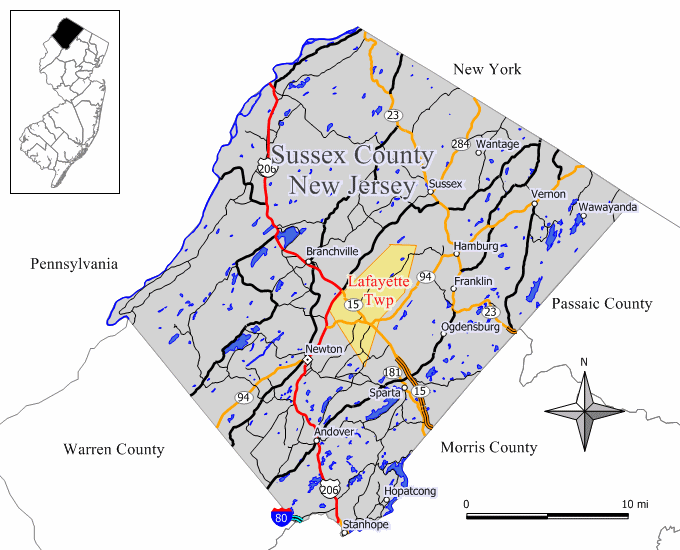
- Map of Lafayette Township in Sussex County. Inset: Location of Sussex County highlighted in the State of New Jersey.

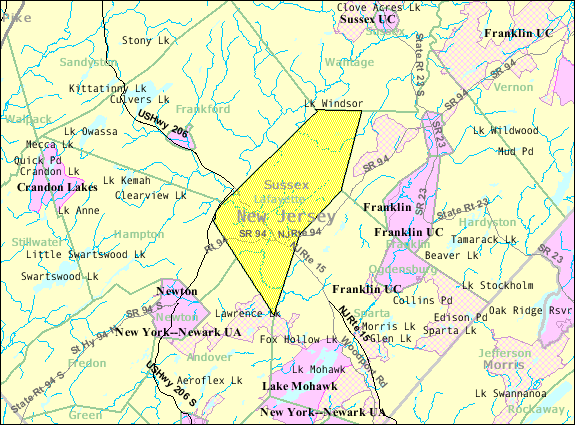
- Census Bureau map of Lafayette Township, New Jersey

- Location in Sussex County Location in New Jersey Location in the United States
- Coordinates: 41.121235°N 74.670297°W
- Country: United States
- State: New Jersey
- County: Sussex
- Incorporated: April 14, 1845
- Named for: Gilbert du Motier, Marquis de Lafayette

Government
  - Type: Township
  - Body: Township Committee
  - Mayor: Kevin O'Leary (R, term ends December 31, 2026)
  - Administrator / Municipal clerk: AnnaRose Fedish

Area
  - Total: 17.97 sq mi (46.54 km^{2})
  - Land: 17.88 sq mi (46.32 km^{2})
  - Water: 0.089 sq mi (0.23 km^{2}) 0.48%
  - Rank: 159th of 565 in state 13th of 24 in county
- Elevation: 535 ft (163 m)

Population (2020)
  - Total: 2,358
  - Estimate (2023): 2,400
  - Rank: 473rd of 565 in state 18th of 24 in county
  - Density: 131.9/sq mi (50.9/km^{2})
  - Rank: 529th of 565 in state 21st of 24 in county
- Time zone: UTC−05:00 (Eastern (EST))
  - Summer (DST): UTC−04:00 (Eastern (EDT))
- ZIP Code: 07848
- Area code: 973
- FIPS code: 3403737440
- GNIS feature ID: 0882260
- Website: www.lafayettetwp.org

Lafayette Township is a township located in the Skylands Region of Sussex County, in the U.S. state of New Jersey. As of the 2020 United States census, the township's population was 2,358, a decrease of 180 (−7.1%) from the 2010 census count of 2,538, which in turn reflected an increase of 238 (+10.3%) from the 2,300 counted in the 2000 census. The township is crossed by Route 15 and Route 94.

== History ==
Lafayette was formed as a Township based on an Act of the New Jersey Legislature on April 14, 1845, from part of Frankford Township and Newton Township (the latter now dissolved), based on the results of a referendum held that same day. The township was the first in the country to be named for Gilbert du Motier, Marquis de Lafayette, the French general and statesman who served in the Continental Army during the American Revolutionary War.

== Historic district ==
- Lafayette Village Historic District
- U.S. National Register of Historic Places
- U.S. Historic district
- New Jersey Register of Historic Places
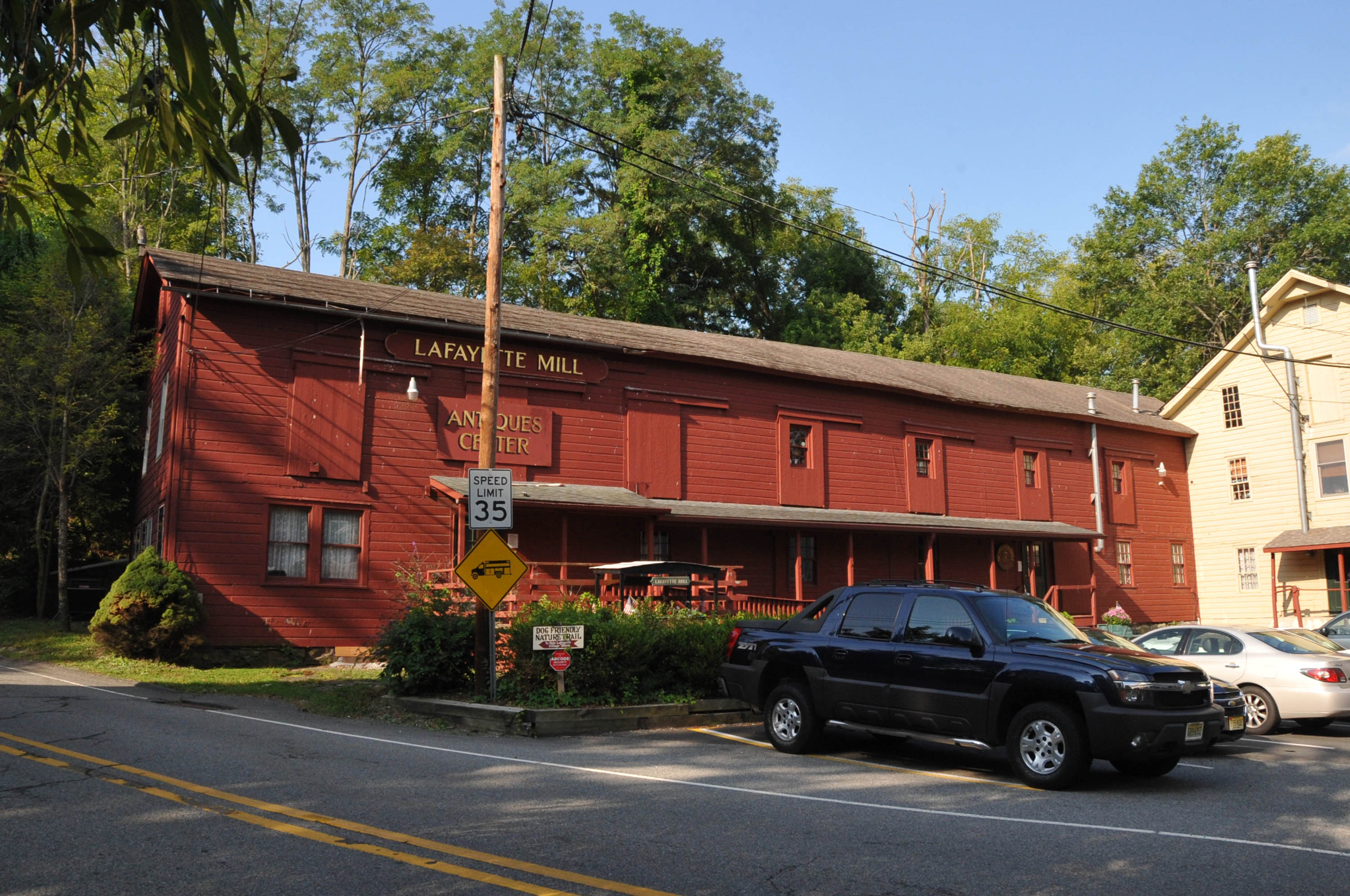
- Lafayette Mill Complex
- Location: NJ 15, Morris Farm Road and Meadows Road
- Area: 31.5 acres (12.7 ha)
- NRHP reference No.: 13001024
- NJRHP No.: 4777

Significant dates
- Added to NRHP: November 15, 2013
- Designated NJRHP: October 21, 2013

The Lafayette Village Historic District is a 31.5-acre (12.7 ha) historic district encompassing the village of Lafayette along NJ 15, Morris Farm Road and Meadows Road. It was added to the National Register of Historic Places on November 15, 2013, for its significance in architecture, exploration/settlement, industry, and transportation. The district includes 42 contributing buildings, a contributing structure, and three contributing sites.

The Lafayette Foundry was built where Morris Farm Road crosses the Paulins Kill in 1836 by Alexander Boyles. There are no visible remains at the site. The Lafayette Mill Complex on Morris Farm Road includes a flour and gristmill, storehouse and distillery on the south side; a general store and playhouse on the north side. The Ludlum-Mabee House was built c. 1838 and is now used by Lafayette Center Preservation Foundation.

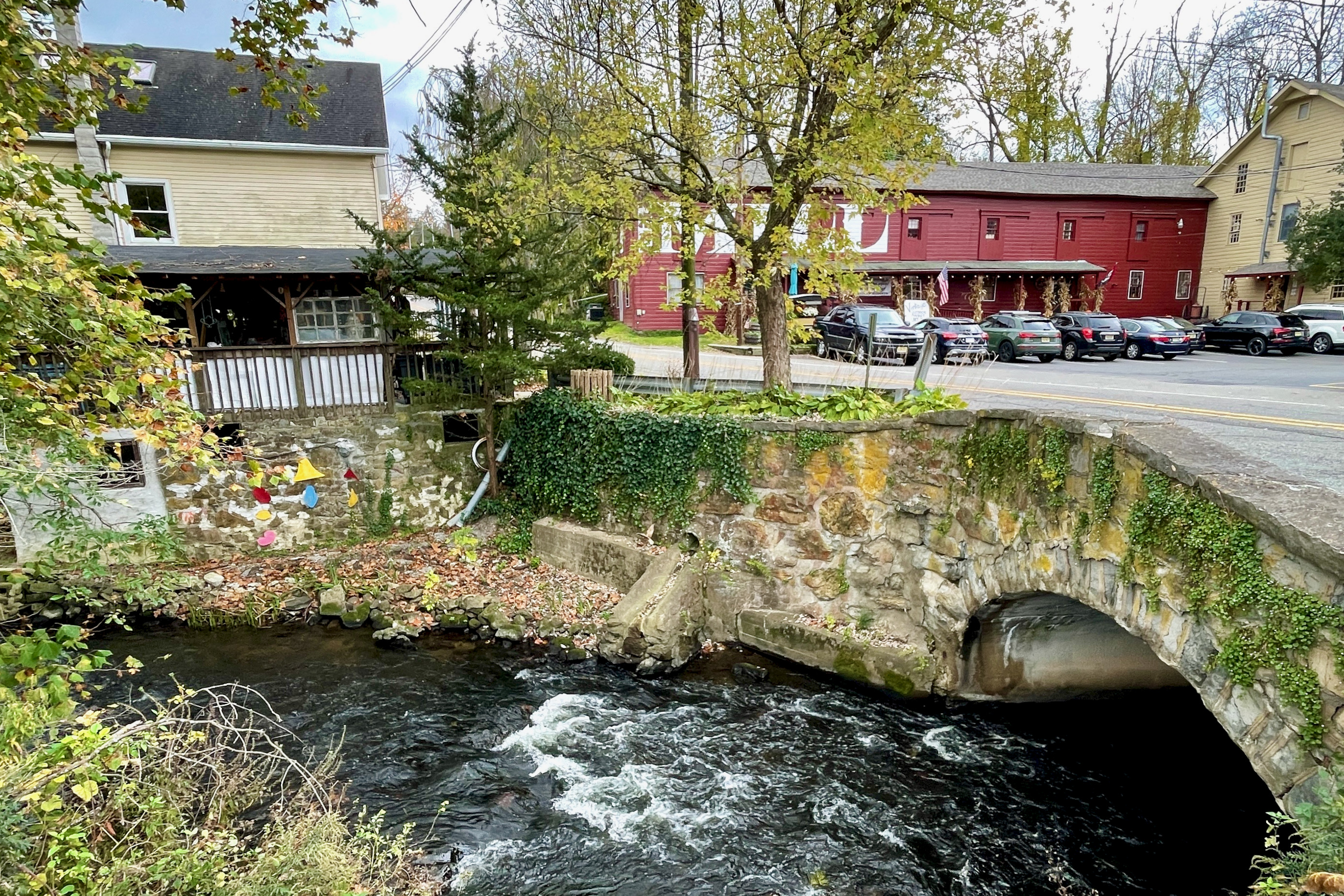
Stone arch bridge over the Paulins Kill

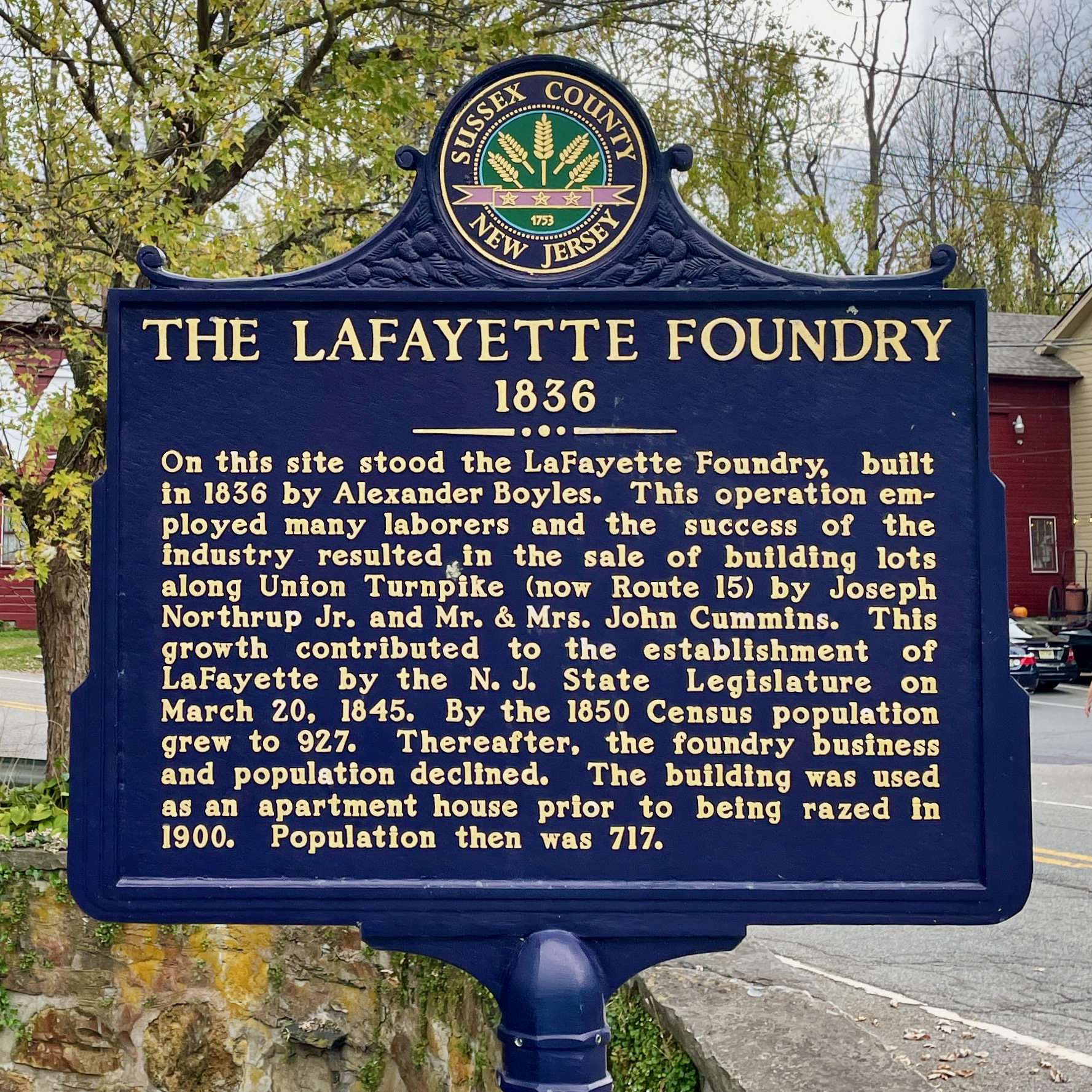
Lafayette Foundry information

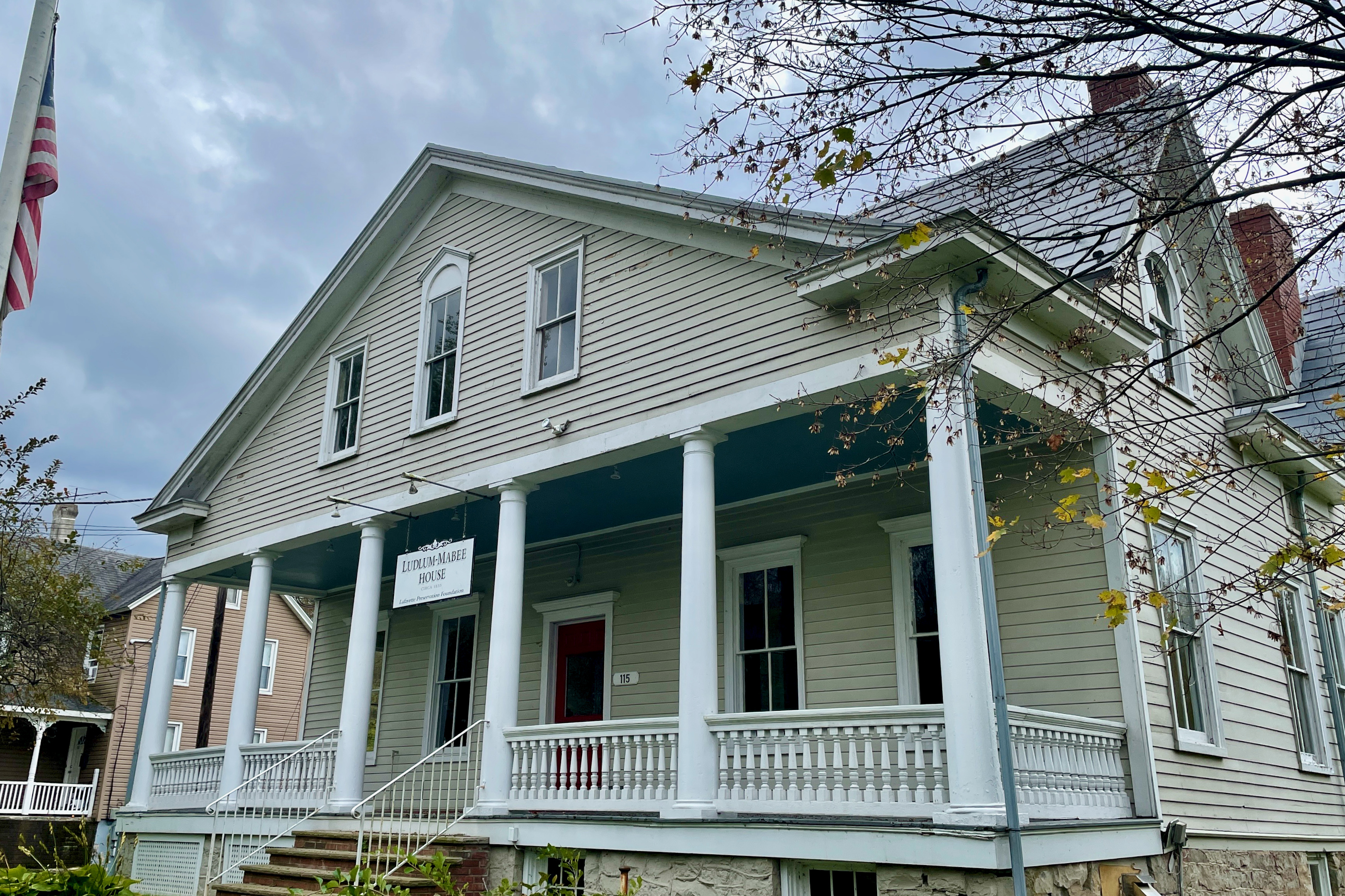
Ludlum-Mabee House

== Geography ==
According to the United States Census Bureau, the township had a total area of 17.97 square miles (46.54 km^{2}), including 17.88 square miles (46.32 km^{2}) of land and 0.09 square miles (0.23 km^{2}) of water (0.48%).

Unincorporated communities, localities and place names located partially or completely within the township include Branchville Junction, Harmonyvale, Hopkins Corner, Warbasse and Warbasse Junction.

Lafayette Township borders the municipalities of Andover Township, Frankford Township, Hampton Township, Hardyston Township, Sparta Township and Wantage Township.

== Demographics ==
Historical population
Census	Pop.	Note	%±
1850	928		—
1860	919		−1.0%
1870	884		−3.8%
1880	781		−11.7%
1890	742		−5.0%
1900	717		−3.4%
1910	683		−4.7%
1920	634		−7.2%
1930	735		15.9%
1940	803		9.3%
1950	836		4.1%
1960	1,100		31.6%
1970	1,202		9.3%
1980	1,614		34.3%
1990	1,902		17.8%
2000	2,300		20.9%
2010	2,538		10.3%
2020	2,358		−7.1%
2023 (est.)	2,400		1.8%
Population sources: 1850–1920 1850–1870; 1850 1870 1880–1890; 1890–1910 1910–1930; 1940–2000 2000; 2010 2020

=== 2010 census ===
The 2010 United States census counted 2,538 people, 875 households, and 721 families in the township. The population density was 141.3 per square mile (54.6/km^{2}). There were 919 housing units at an average density of 51.2 per square mile (19.8/km^{2}). The racial makeup was 95.43% (2,422) White, 1.58% (40) Black or African American, 0.00% (0) Native American, 0.75% (19) Asian, 0.00% (0) Pacific Islander, 0.63% (16) from other races, and 1.62% (41) from two or more races. Hispanic or Latino of any race were 5.08% (129) of the population.

Of the 875 households, 34.2% had children under the age of 18; 69.6% were married couples living together; 8.9% had a female householder with no husband present and 17.6% were non-families. Of all households, 13.1% were made up of individuals and 4.8% had someone living alone who was 65 years of age or older. The average household size was 2.85 and the average family size was 3.12.

23.4% of the population were under the age of 18, 7.9% from 18 to 24, 20.8% from 25 to 44, 35.1% from 45 to 64, and 12.8% who were 65 years of age or older. The median age was 43.7 years. For every 100 females, the population had 95.4 males. For every 100 females ages 18 and older there were 97.5 males.

The Census Bureau's 2006–2010 American Community Survey showed that (in 2010 inflation-adjusted dollars) median household income was $96,369 (with a margin of error of +/− $10,553) and the median family income was $98,750 (+/− $11,241). Males had a median income of $71,607 (+/− $22,034) versus $56,964 (+/− $13,270) for females. The per capita income for the borough was $34,364 (+/− $3,922). About 6.4% of families and 8.0% of the population were below the poverty line, including 12.7% of those under age 18 and none of those age 65 or over.

=== 2000 census ===
As of the 2000 United States census there were 2,300 people, 771 households, and 647 families residing in the township. The population density was 127.6 inhabitants per square mile (49.3/km^{2}). There were 799 housing units at an average density of 44.3 per square mile (17.1/km^{2}). The racial makeup of the township was 97.04% White, 1.04% African American, 0.09% Native American, 0.78% Asian, 0.35% from other races, and 0.70% from two or more races. Hispanic or Latino of any race were 2.35% of the population.

There were 771 households, out of which 38.1% had children under the age of 18 living with them, 73.4% were married couples living together, 7.5% had a female householder with no husband present, and 16.0% were non-families. 12.1% of all households were made up of individuals, and 3.6% had someone living alone who was 65 years of age or older. The average household size was 2.95 and the average family size was 3.20.

In the township the population was spread out, with 27.4% under the age of 18, 5.3% from 18 to 24, 29.5% from 25 to 44, 28.6% from 45 to 64, and 9.3% who were 65 years of age or older. The median age was 39 years. For every 100 females, there were 100.7 males. For every 100 females age 18 and over, there were 97.7 males.

The median income for a household in the township was $82,805, and the median income for a family was $87,650. Males had a median income of $61,307 versus $38,816 for females. The per capita income for the township was $30,491. About 1.2% of families and 3.7% of the population were below the poverty line, including 2.0% of those under age 18 and 2.3% of those age 65 or over.

== Government ==
=== Local government ===
Lafayette Township is governed under the Township form of New Jersey municipal government, one of 141 municipalities (of the 564) statewide that use this form, the second-most commonly used form of government in the state. The Township Committee is comprised of five members, who are elected directly by the voters at-large in partisan elections to serve three-year terms of office on a staggered basis, with either one or two seats coming up for election each year as part of the November general election in a three-year cycle. At an annual reorganization meeting, the Township Committee selects one of its members to serve as Mayor.

As of 2024, members of the Lafayette Township Committee are Mayor Alan R. Henderson (R, term on township committee ends December 31, 2026; term as mayor ends 2024), Deputy Mayor Kevin K. O'Leary (R, term on committee and as deputy mayor ends 2024), Lisa Carlson (R, 2026), Patrick Geaney (R, 2025) and Richard Hughes (R, 2025).

=== Federal, state and county representation ===
Lafayette Township is located in the 5th Congressional District and is part of New Jersey's 24th state legislative district.

For the 119th United States Congress, New Jersey's 5th congressional district is represented by Josh Gottheimer (D, Wyckoff). New Jersey is represented in the United States Senate by Democrats Cory Booker (Newark, term ends 2027) and Andy Kim (Moorestown, term ends 2031).

For the 2026–2027 session, the 24th legislative district of the New Jersey Legislature is represented in the State Senate by Parker Space (R, Wantage Township) and in the General Assembly by Dawn Fantasia (R, Franklin) and Mike Inganamort (R, Chester Township).

Sussex County is governed by a Board of County Commissioners whose five members are elected at-large in partisan elections on a staggered basis, with either one or two seats coming up for election each year. At an annual reorganization meeting held in the beginning of January, the board selects a Commissioner Director and Deputy Director from among its members, with day-to-day supervision of the operation of the county delegated to a County Administrator. As of 2025, Sussex County's Commissioners are Director Jill Space (R, Wantage Township, 2025), Deputy Director Chris Carney (R, Frankford Township, 2027), Jack DeGroot (R, Sussex, 2026), William Hayden (I, Branchville, 2025) and Alan Henderson (R, Lafayette Township, 2027).

Constitutional officers elected on a countywide basis are Clerk Jeffrey M. Parrott (R, Wantage Township, 2026), Sheriff Michael F. Strada (R, Hampton Township, 2025) and Surrogate Gary R. Chiusano (R, Frankford Township, 2028).

=== Politics ===
As of March 2011, there were a total of 1,738 registered voters in Lafayette Township, of which 228 (13.1% vs. 16.5% countywide) were registered as Democrats, 781 (44.9% vs. 39.3%) were registered as Republicans and 727 (41.8% vs. 44.1%) were registered as Unaffiliated. There were 2 voters registered as Libertarians or Greens. Among the township's 2010 Census population, 68.5% (vs. 65.8% in Sussex County) were registered to vote, including 89.4% of those ages 18 and over (vs. 86.5% countywide).

Gubernatorial election results for Lafayette Township
Year	Republican		Democratic		Third party(ies)	
Year	No.	%	No.	%	No.	%
2025	806	66.12%	399	32.73%	14	1.15%
2021	774	72.74%	281	26.41%	9	0.85%
2017	584	69.52%	219	26.07%	37	4.40%
2013	646	76.54%	172	20.38%	26	3.08%
2009	635	66.35%	214	22.36%	108	11.29%
2005	573	63.04%	286	31.46%	50	5.50%

In the 2012 presidential election, Republican Mitt Romney received 867 votes (65.7% vs. 59.4% countywide), ahead of Democrat Barack Obama with 431 votes (32.7% vs. 38.2%) and other candidates with 18 votes (1.4% vs. 2.1%), among the 1,319 ballots cast by the township's 1,815 registered voters, for a turnout of 72.7% (vs. 68.3% in Sussex County). In the 2008 presidential election, Republican John McCain received 921 votes (67.3% vs. 59.2% countywide), ahead of Democrat Barack Obama with 417 votes (30.5% vs. 38.7%) and other candidates with 18 votes (1.3% vs. 1.5%), among the 1,368 ballots cast by the township's 1,740 registered voters, for a turnout of 78.6% (vs. 76.9% in Sussex County). In the 2004 presidential election, Republican George W. Bush received 883 votes (67.4% vs. 63.9% countywide), ahead of Democrat John Kerry with 404 votes (30.8% vs. 34.4%) and other candidates with 18 votes (1.4% vs. 1.3%), among the 1,311 ballots cast by the township's 1,583 registered voters, for a turnout of 82.8% (vs. 77.7% in the whole county).

United States presidential election results for Lafayette Township 2024 2020 2016 2012 2008 2004
Year	Republican		Democratic		Third party(ies)	
Year	No.	%	No.	%	No.	%
2024	1,030	67.50%	472	30.93%	24	1.57%
2020	1,024	64.93%	509	32.28%	44	2.79%
2016	964	69.60%	360	25.99%	61	4.40%
2012	867	65.88%	431	32.75%	18	1.37%
2008	921	67.92%	417	30.75%	18	1.33%
2004	883	67.66%	404	30.96%	18	1.38%

In the 2013 gubernatorial election, Republican Chris Christie received 76.5% of the vote (646 cast), ahead of Democrat Barbara Buono with 20.4% (172 votes), and other candidates with 3.1% (26 votes), among the 855 ballots cast by the township's 1,824 registered voters (11 ballots were spoiled), for a turnout of 46.9%. In the 2009 gubernatorial election, Republican Chris Christie received 635 votes (66.2% vs. 63.3% countywide), ahead of Democrat Jon Corzine with 214 votes (22.3% vs. 25.7%), Independent Chris Daggett with 94 votes (9.8% vs. 9.1%) and other candidates with 14 votes (1.5% vs. 1.3%), among the 959 ballots cast by the township's 1,702 registered voters, yielding a 56.3% turnout (vs. 52.3% in the county).

United States Senate election results for Lafayette Township1
Year	Republican		Democratic		Third party(ies)	
Year	No.	%	No.	%	No.	%
2024	992	66.98%	448	30.25%	41	2.77%
2018	827	69.03%	307	25.63%	64	5.34%
2012	826	64.78%	396	31.06%	53	4.16%
2006	594	66.67%	278	31.20%	19	2.13%

United States Senate election results for Lafayette Township2
Year	Republican		Democratic		Third party(ies)	
Year	No.	%	No.	%	No.	%
2020	993	64.06%	525	33.87%	32	2.06%
2014	490	70.10%	188	26.90%	21	3.00%
2013	428	74.83%	142	24.83%	2	0.35%
2008	825	62.59%	448	33.99%	45	3.41%

== Education ==
Public school students in pre-kindergarten through eighth grade attend the Lafayette Township School District. As of the 2022–23 school year, the district, comprised of one school, had an enrollment of 209 students and 23.9 classroom teachers (on an FTE basis), for a student–teacher ratio of 8.8:1.

For ninth through twelfth grades, public school students attend High Point Regional High School, which also serves students from Branchville, Frankford Township, Montague Township, Sussex Borough and Wantage Township (where the school is located). As of the 2022–23 school year, the high school had an enrollment of 817 students and 68.4 classroom teachers (on an FTE basis), for a student–teacher ratio of 11.9:1. The district is governed by a nine-member board of education; seats on the board are allocated based on the population of the constituent municipalities, with one seat assigned to Lafayette Township.

== Transportation ==
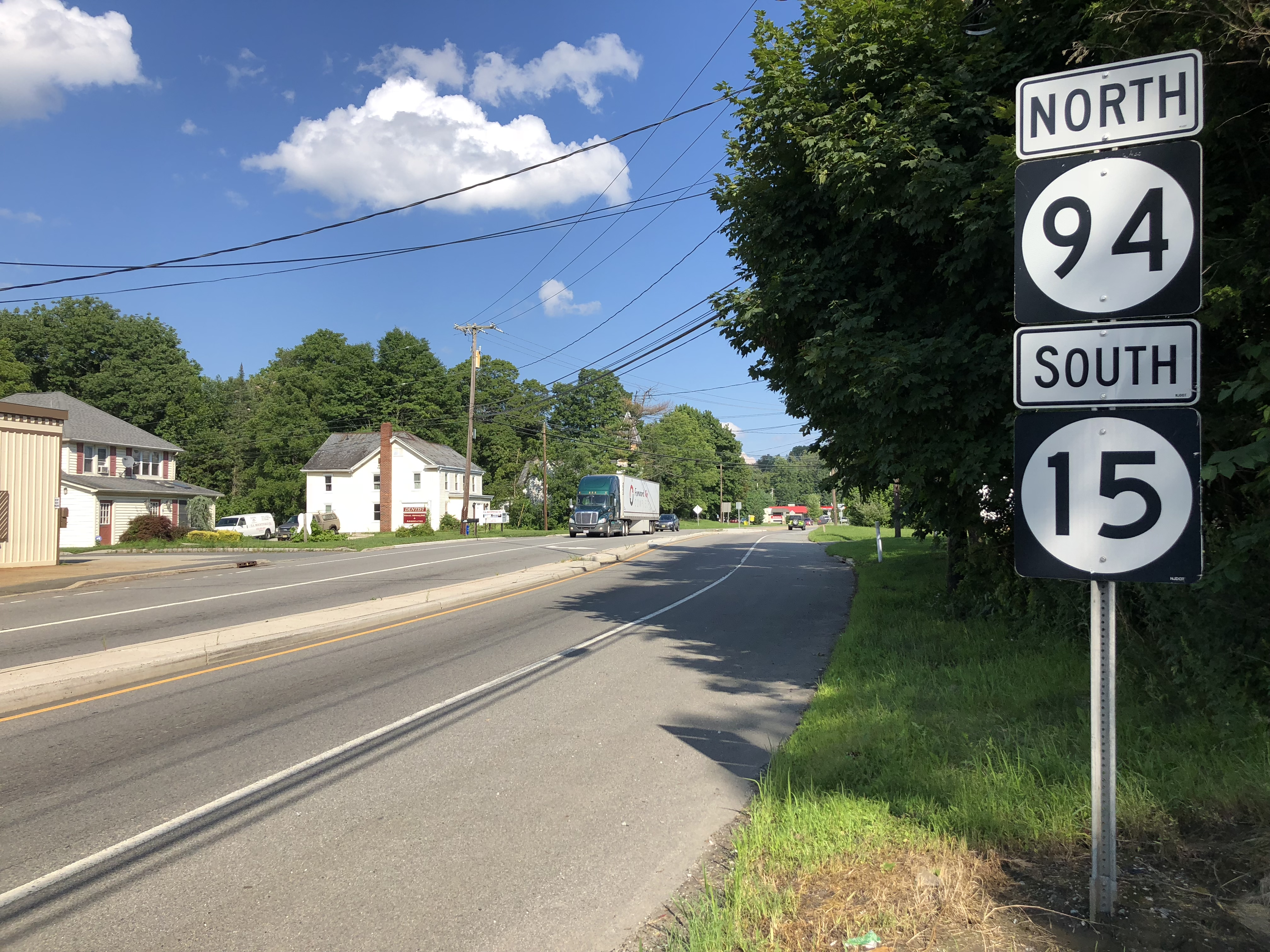
Route 15 southbound and Route 94 northbound in Lafayette Township

As of May 2010, the township had a total of 46.27 miles (74.46 km) of roadways, of which 29.91 miles (48.14 km) were maintained by the municipality, 10.24 miles (16.48 km) by Sussex County and 6.12 miles (9.85 km) by the New Jersey Department of Transportation.

The main highways serving Lafayette Township are New Jersey Route 15 and New Jersey Route 94. The two routes run concurrently in opposite directions for a short stretch in Lafayette Township.

== Notable people ==
People who were born in, residents of, or otherwise closely associated with Lafayette Township include:

- Andy Albeck (1921–2010), movie executive who served as president and chief executive of United Artists and operated the award-winning Albeck Family Christmas Tree farm in Lafayette Township
- Cleve Backster (1924–2013), interrogation specialist for the Central Intelligence Agency, best known for his 1960s experiments with plants using a polygraph which led to his theory of "primary perception" where he claimed that plants "feel pain" and have extrasensory perception
- Bhikkhu Bodhi (born 1944), Theravada Buddhist monk, ordained in Sri Lanka, who was appointed the second president of the Buddhist Publication Society
- Andrew J. Rogers (1828–1900), lawyer, teacher, clerk, police commissioner and Democratic Party politician who represented New Jersey's 4th congressional district in the United States House of Representatives from 1863 to 1867
- Jay Nelson Tuck (1916–1985), journalist, television critic who served as president of The Newspaper Guild from 1950 to 1952
