= Frankford Township, New Jersey =

Township in Sussex County, New Jersey, US

- Township
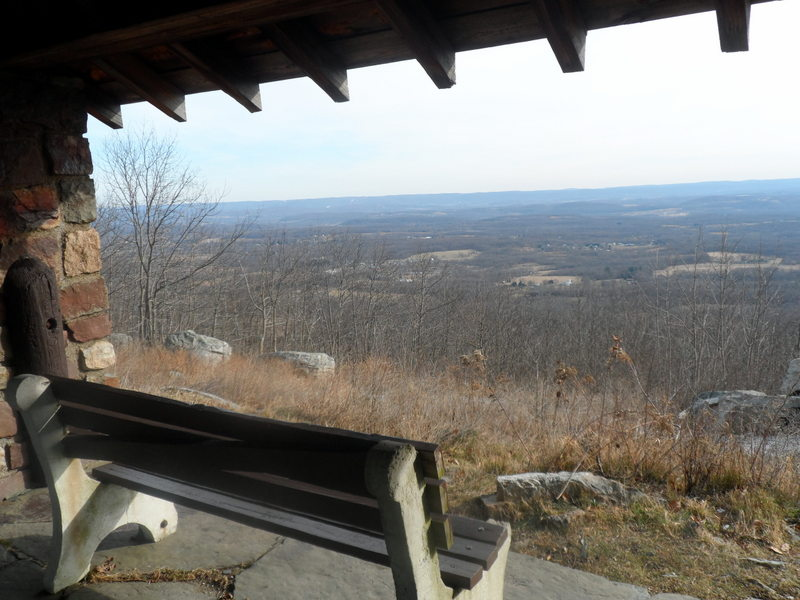
- View from Stokes State Forest

- Seal

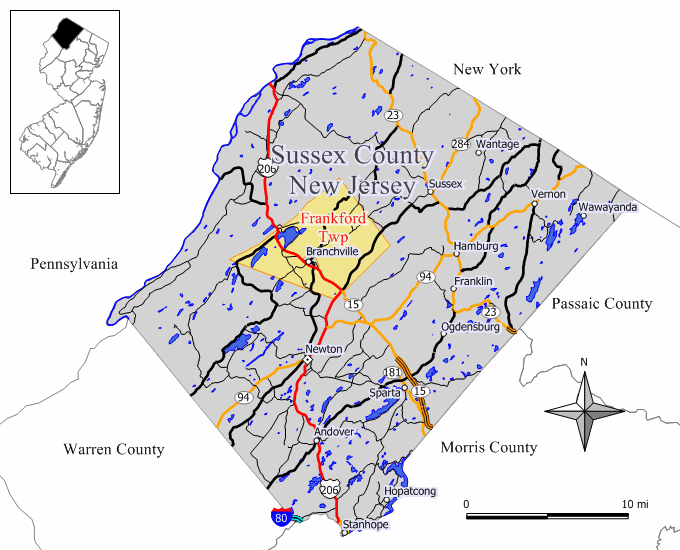
- Map of Frankford Township in Sussex County. Inset: Location of Sussex County highlighted in the State of New Jersey.

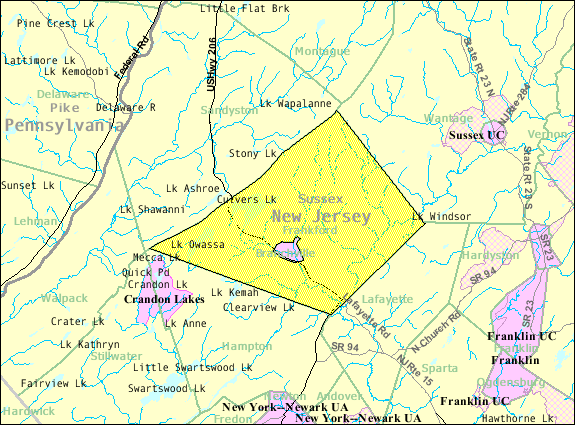
- Census Bureau map of Frankford Township, New Jersey

- Location in Sussex County Location in New Jersey Location in the United States
- Coordinates: 41.164296°N 74.737798°W
- Country: United States
- State: New Jersey
- County: Sussex
- Formed: April 10, 1797
- Incorporated: February 21, 1798
- Named for: Frankford, Philadelphia

Government
  - Type: Township
  - Body: Township Committee
  - Mayor: Edwin Risdon Jr. (R, term ends December 31, 2026)
  - Administrator: Lori Nienstedt
  - Municipal clerk: Lori Nienstedt

Area
  - Total: 35.30 sq mi (91.42 km^{2})
  - Land: 33.88 sq mi (87.74 km^{2})
  - Water: 1.42 sq mi (3.68 km^{2}) 4.02%
  - Rank: 68th of 565 in state 6th of 24 in county
- Elevation: 659 ft (201 m)

Population (2020)
  - Total: 5,302
  - Estimate (2023): 5,304
  - Rank: 370th of 565 in state 9th of 24 in county
  - Density: 156.5/sq mi (60.4/km^{2})
  - Rank: 517th of 565 in state 19th of 24 in county
- Time zone: UTC−05:00 (Eastern (EST))
  - Summer (DST): UTC−04:00 (Eastern (EDT))
- ZIP Code: 07826 – Branchville
- Area code: 973
- FIPS code: 3403724810
- GNIS feature ID: 0882267
- Website: www.frankfordtownship.org

Frankford Township is a township in Sussex County, in the U.S. state of New Jersey. As of the 2020 United States census, the township's population was 5,302, a decrease of 263 (−4.7%) from the 2010 census count of 5,565, which in turn reflected an increase of 145 (+2.7%) from the 5,420 counted in the 2000 census.

Frankford Township was formed on April 10, 1797, from portions of Newton Township, and was incorporated on February 21, 1798, as one of New Jersey's initial 104 townships by an act of the New Jersey Legislature. Portions of the township were taken to form Lafayette Township and Sparta Township (both established on April 14, 1845), along with Branchville (March 9, 1898), which is completely surrounded by the township. The township was said to have been named after Frankford, a neighborhood of Philadelphia, after a visitor who hailed from that area came to help out at the rural school in the township.

Since 1976, the township has been the home of the Farm and Horse Show, which expanded after it was relocated from Branchville. The New Jersey State Fair / Sussex County Farm & Horse Show has evolved as the site of numerous activities and events throughout the year. The township's Skylands Park, a 4,300-seat baseball park, was home to the New Jersey Cardinals of the New York–Penn League from 1993 to 2005, and the Sussex Skyhawks of the Can-Am League from 2006 to 2010. Since 2005, the stadium is the home of the Sussex County Miners, which plays as part of the Frontier League.

== Geography ==
According to the United States Census Bureau, the township had a total area of 35.30 square miles (91.42 km^{2}), including 33.88 square miles (87.74 km^{2}) of land and 1.42 square miles (3.68 km^{2}) of water (4.02%). Culver's Lake and Lake Owassa, two natural lakes nestled below the Kittatinny Mountain, form the northern border. The township is located in the Kittatinny Valley which is a section of the 700-mile (1,100 km) long Great Appalachian Valley that stretches from Canada to Alabama.

The borough of Branchville is completely surrounded by Frankford Township, making it part of 21 pairs of "doughnut towns" in the state, where one municipality entirely surrounds another. The township borders the Sussex County municipalities of Hampton Township, Lafayette Township, Sandyston Township and Wantage Township.

Ross Corner (with a 2020 Census population of 120) is an unincorporated community and census-designated place (CDP) located within Frankford Township. Augusta is another unincorporated community located within the township. Other unincorporated communities, localities and place names located partially or completely within the township include Armstrong, Culvers Gap, Culvers Inlet, Culvers Lake, Lake Owassa, Mount Pisgah, Northrup, Pallettown, Pellettown, Plains and Wykertown.

Elevation ranges from 450 feet (140 m) above sea level and approach 1,000 feet (300 m). At the Paulinskill River, the elevation is 500 feet (150 m). There are several hills with elevations of 800 feet (240 m) and one hill of 908 feet (277 m).

== History ==
=== Geology ===
Most of Frankford Township is on the Ordovician Martinsburg Formation. This is a shale, slate, and limestone formation created 450 million years ago when a chain of volcanic islands collided with proto North America. This is a dark, almost black, shale. However the Jacksonburg formation rides over the Martinsburg shale in most areas. This shale is silver in color in the inside of the shale.

The islands went over the North American plate, creating the Highlands of Sussex County. The Kittatinny Valley was uplifted. The sediment at the bottom of seas was uplifted and formed shale. Millions of years of erosion occurred and there was a second event. About 400 million years ago small continent that was long and thin, collided with proto North America creating folding and faulting. The Silurian Shawnangunk conglomerate that was under a shallow sea, lifted due to pressure. The pressure created heat which melted the silica, bonded the quartz and conglomerate together, creating Kittatinny Mountain.

The Wisconsin Glacier covered all of the township from 21,000 BCE to 13,000 BCE. The glacier covered the top of Kittatinny Mountain. End moraines exist in Stokes State Forest as well as just off County Route 565 north of the Skylands Park. Also about a mile south of Ross's Corner is an end moraine. An esker was created when the glacier retreated due to climate warming. Many ponds and lakes created. Culver Lake was created at this time, as the drainage became blocked. The township is drained by two river systems. The Paulinskill and the Wallkill. The Paulinskill travels in a northwesterly direction throughout the township before turning southwest. Papakatkin Creek starts east of Branchville Reservoir and drains into the Wallkill River north of the town of Sussex. Another creek starts near the base of Sunrise Mountain and empties into the Papakatkin Creek near Pellettown. Dry Creek starts at the Branchville Reservoir, travels south and enters into Culver's Creek in Branchville; eventually empties into the Paulinskill. There is a chain of hills between Dry Creek and Papakatin Creek. These hills are what separate the two river drainage systems. The drainage divide is just north of Route 206 and the goes northwest toward Branchville Reservoir. Water near Route 206 or south of Route 206 drains into the Paulinskill. Water north of Route 206 drains into the Wallkill River.

Culvers Gap was made by an ancient stream that was later diverted. The gap's bottom is 400 feet (120 m) below the top of Kittatinny Mountain, which can be seen for many miles.

=== Paleo Indians ===
After the glacier melted, the area was cold and wet. The area was a Tundra Biome which grasses grew slowly. This is when Paleo Indians came into the area around 11,000 BCE. After several thousand years, the area became warmer. As the climate warmed, vegetation patterns changed. With change in plant life, herbivore megafauna slowly died out. Or were concentrated in certain areas which allowed for over hunting by Paleo-Indians. Coniferous forests of spruce and pine began to grow. The area then became a Taiga Biome. Paleo Indians carried spears with fluted points made of black chert or jasper. They used Culver's Gap to travel from the Flatbrook Valley to the Kittatinny Valley. This route was later used by Native Americans. Paleo Indians made temporary camps and traveled often as they were hunter gatherers. It is difficult to locate their camps as they are located many feet below the present ground surface of today. One would have to search the Pleistocene gravels.

Mastodons, Musk Ox and Caribou roamed the area. The bones of Mastodons were found in Highland Lakes, Swartswood Lake, Great Meadows, and in Orange County, New York. As climate warmed, megafauna either traveled north, were over hunted, or became extinct due to lack of food.

Climate warmed between 8000 BCE to 6000 BCE. At this time more deciduous trees such as oak, maple, birch, and willows began to grow. Other big game then slowly inhabited the area, such as deer, elk, bear, and moose.

By 3000 BCE other deciduous trees grew such as hickory, cherry, walnut, beech, butternut, chestnut, ash and elm. Hunter gatherers populations slowly grew as now there was more food in the forests. The Paulinskill River is shallow which allowed for easy fishing. The valley has small hills which allowed for easy travel and setting up camps. Due to the diversity of the deciduous trees and plants growing in the grasslands, game was everywhere. Gathering became more intensive.

Around 1000 BCE, clay pottery was invented which allowed the storage of seeds, nuts and other food. The bow and arrow was also invented around this time. Hunter gatherer populations began to rise more due to the ability to store nuts in pottery and procure game through the bow and arrow. However camps were still temporary and traveling was still done often in search of game and plants. As populations grew, camps became more seasonal. These camps were along rivers. It was at this time that the Lenape Native Americans entered the area from the west.

=== Lenape Native Americans ===
The Lenape settled this area around 1000 BCE or slightly later. They settled their seasonal extended family camps along the river valleys as food and water was abundant there. They had a trade route that went through the township. The path started at Minisink Island on the Delaware and went to Raritan Bay. The path went from Minisink Island to Culver's Gap, and continued through Frankford Twp. where it crossed the Paulinskill River and went south, east of Newton. Around the year 800 CE to 1000 CE, triangular projectile points were developed. This was the beginning of the bow and arrow in North America. It was also at this time around the year 1000 CE that agriculture began to be developed along with clay pottery. With potter, the bow and arrow, along with agriculture; Native American populations grew even more. The Lenape were still hunter gatherers and supplemented their procuring of wild game with corn, beans and squash. They had gardens that were round or oval in fertile river valleys. The Paulinskill River and the surrounding valley offered excellent area for family camps of Native Americans. The Paulinskill River is shallow and narrow which allowed for easy fishing, bathing, and gathering of plants. Game also is attracted to the river valley such as deer, bear, waterfowl and other small game. Since the land is flat, this allowed for easy traveling, hunting and food gathering such as various nuts. Culvers Lake was the site of Native American villages and Papakating Creek was used as a campsite. Many trees were huge, which allowed for large nut crops each autumn. The Native American populations continued to grow even though they were living in a late Stone Age culture. Populations expanded until the Little Ice Age and European arrival.

=== The Little Ice Age and European contact ===
The Little Ice Age began in the early 17th century and ended in the mid 19th century. In the late 17th century is when Europeans came into contact with the Lenape Native Americans in this area. The Little Ice Age had to have a drastic effect on Native American populations in this area. The area had late frosts in June and early frosts in August. This would have had not only an effect on corn crops, but on hunting game as well for the Native Americans. Corn took longer to grow than the corn farmers grow today. Trees bearing nuts such as Oak, Hickory, Beech, Walnut, Butternut, and Chestnut would have reduced nut crops by cold weather. Game animals tend to go into a semi hibernation during cold spells which would make game more difficult to find. Extreme cold weather and deep snow also made finding game difficult. Shallow rivers such as the Paulinskill and Wallkill froze quickly, thus reducing the ability to fish. Due to these factors many Native Americans starved in this area.

Native Americans had no immunity to European diseases because of separation from Europe and Asia for thousands of years made them vulnerable to European diseases. Because Native Americans traveled and traded with each other, getting smallpox was not that difficult. Population of Native Americans perished because of this also. The Native populations decreased during the late 17th century and early 18th century in Frankford Township and the rest of New Jersey due to disease.

By 1750 nearly all the Native Americans were gone from this area. This was due to land patents, disease from Europeans, and starvation from several hundred years of the Little Ice Age.

=== Early European settlement ===
The first permanent settlement of European settlers in the township probably happened around 1699. At that time, this area was part of Burlington County. In 1713 this area was part of Hunterdon County, as Hunterdon separated from Burlington. Later the area was included in Morris County when it separated from Hunterdon County.

The land was flat with fresh water from the Paulinskill, Dry Creek or Papakatkin Creek. A Quaker meeting house was established in 1700 near Papakating Creek near Plains Road. Settlers may have been here as early as 1699. Soil was fertile for farming. Huge trees in virgin forests were everywhere. Game, fish and waterfowl were abundant. The land was cleared for farming. The forests were slowly cut down with axes. Fire was used to clear land. The area was still cold due to the Little Ice Age so farming progressed slowly. Colonists raised pigs, chickens, sheep, and cattle brought from Europe. Apples trees were also planted. The area was controlled by England and part of Morris County at this time.

Settlers came from New York State by way of the Wallkill River drainage or by route through Culver's Gap. The Highlands to the east were difficult to cross.

=== French and Indian War ===
George Washington started the French and Indian war at the battle of Jumonville Glen on May 28, 1754 in southwestern Pennsylvania by killing French soldiers and a French diplomate Joseph Coulon de Villiers de Jumonville. At that time, Frankford Township was near the edge of the frontier and settlers just west of the township were being attacked by Native Americans. Farms and houses were burned; settlers killed. Many colonists moved east to be safe. Eight fortified houses were built from Phillipsburg, New Jersey to Port Jervis, New York along the Delaware River. Native Americans sided with the French due to being treated unfairly by the English, such as the Walking Purchase of 1737 and land patents. The Native Americans did not understand how the English viewed land possession.

== Demographics ==
Historical population
Census	Pop.	Note	%±
1810	1,637		—
1820	2,008		22.7%
1830	1,996		−0.6%
1840	2,410		20.7%
1850	1,941	*	−19.5%
1860	1,828		−5.8%
1870	1,776		−2.8%
1880	1,682		−5.3%
1890	1,459		−13.3%
1900	932	*	−36.1%
1910	1,004		7.7%
1920	936		−6.8%
1930	1,074		14.7%
1940	1,244		15.8%
1950	1,530		23.0%
1960	2,170		41.8%
1970	2,777		28.0%
1980	4,654		67.6%
1990	5,114		9.9%
2000	5,420		6.0%
2010	5,565		2.7%
2020	5,302		−4.7%
2023 (est.)	5,304		0.0%
Population sources: 1810–1920 1840 1850–1870; 1850 1870 1880–1890; 1890–1910 1910–1930; 1940–2000 2000; 2010 2020 * = Lost territory in previous decade.

=== 2020 census ===
According to the 2020 United States census, Frankford Township has a population of 5,302 people, 1,969 households. Of the population 45.8% are women, 20.4% are age 65 and older, 19.5% are under 18 years of age, and 5.6% are under 5 years of age.

86.1% of the population are white, 8.2% are Hispanic or Latino, 6% are two or more races, 2.3% are Asian, 1.1% are Black or African American, 0.1% are American Indian/Alaskan Native, and 0.0% are Native Hawaiian/Asian Pacific Islander

The median household income is $111,392.00. The population per square mile is 156.5, and there is a land area of 33.88 square miles.

=== 2010 census ===
The 2010 United States census counted 5,565 people, 2,046 households, and 1,569 families in the township. The population density was 163.6 per square mile (63.2/km^{2}). There were 2,520 housing units at an average density of 74.1 per square mile (28.6/km^{2}). The racial makeup was 96.30% (5,359) White, 0.99% (55) Black or African American, 0.14% (8) Native American, 0.88% (49) Asian, 0.00% (0) Pacific Islander, 0.32% (18) from other races, and 1.37% (76) from two or more races. Hispanic or Latino of any race were 3.16% (176) of the population.

Of the 2,046 households, 28.4% had children under the age of 18; 65.8% were married couples living together; 6.5% had a female householder with no husband present and 23.3% were non-families. Of all households, 19.1% were made up of individuals and 8.5% had someone living alone who was 65 years of age or older. The average household size was 2.66 and the average family size was 3.04.

21.0% of the population were under the age of 18, 7.2% from 18 to 24, 19.7% from 25 to 44, 35.6% from 45 to 64, and 16.5% who were 65 years of age or older. The median age was 46.0 years. For every 100 females, the population had 100.7 males. For every 100 females ages 18 and older there were 101.2 males.

The Census Bureau's 2006–2010 American Community Survey showed that (in 2010 inflation-adjusted dollars) median household income was $96,518 (with a margin of error of +/− $9,850) and the median family income was $102,986 (+/− $10,972). Males had a median income of $69,861 (+/− $5,596) versus $53,269 (+/− $13,178) for females. The per capita income for the borough was $38,276 (+/− $2,921). About 2.9% of families and 3.1% of the population were below the poverty line, including 2.5% of those under age 18 and 1.9% of those age 65 or over.

=== 2000 census ===
As of the 2000 United States census there were 5,420 people, 1,839 households, and 1,473 families residing in the township. The population density was 158.9 inhabitants per square mile (61.4/km^{2}). There were 2,295 housing units at an average density of 67.3 per square mile (26.0/km^{2}). The racial makeup of the township was 98.15% White, 0.39% African American, 0.06% Native American, 0.39% Asian, 0.50% from other races, and 0.52% from two or more races. Hispanic or Latino of any race were 1.77% of the population.

There were 1,839 households, out of which 37.4% had children under the age of 18 living with them, 70.4% were married couples living together, 6.7% had a female householder with no husband present, and 19.9% were non-families. 16.5% of all households were made up of individuals, and 6.1% had someone living alone who was 65 years of age or older. The average household size was 2.81 and the average family size was 3.17.

In the township the age distribution of the population shows 25.0% under the age of 18, 6.6% from 18 to 24, 26.4% from 25 to 44, 29.0% from 45 to 64, and 13.0% who were 65 years of age or older. The median age was 41 years. For every 100 females, there were 96.7 males. For every 100 females age 18 and over, there were 92.9 males.

The median income for a household in the township was $64,444, and the median income for a family was $69,449. Males had a median income of $49,781 versus $31,383 for females. The per capita income for the township was $25,051. About 3.5% of families and 5.1% of the population were below the poverty line, including 5.3% of those under age 18 and 6.0% of those age 65 or over.

== Government ==
=== Local government ===
Frankford Township is governed under the Township form of New Jersey municipal government, one of 141 municipalities (of the 564) statewide that use this form, the second-most commonly used form of government in the state. The governing body is comprised of a five-member Township Committee, whose members are elected directly by the voters at-large in partisan elections to serve three-year terms of office on a staggered basis, with one seat coming up for election each year as part of the November general election in a three-year cycle. At an annual reorganization meeting held in the first week of January, the committee selects one of its members to serve as mayor and another as deputy mayor.

As of January 2024 members of the Frankford Township Committee are Mayor David Silverthorne (R, term on township committee ends December 31, 2026; term as mayor ends on December 31, 2024), Deputy Mayor James Ayers (R, term on committee ends 2026; term as deputy mayor ends 2024), Emery Castimore Jr. (R, 2025), Nicholas Civitan (R, 2025) and Edwin F. Risdon Jr. (R, 2024).

Constitutional officers are: Municipal Clerk, Lori Nienstedt; Chief Financial Officer, Sharon Yarosz; Tax Collector, Stephen Lance; and Tax Assessor, Jason Laliker.

=== Federal, state and county representation ===
Frankford Township is located in the 5th Congressional District and is part of New Jersey's 24th state legislative district.

For the 119th United States Congress, New Jersey's 5th congressional district is represented by Josh Gottheimer (D, Wyckoff). New Jersey is represented in the United States Senate by Democrats Cory Booker (Newark, term ends 2027) and Andy Kim (Moorestown, term ends 2031).

For the 2026–2027 session, the 24th legislative district of the New Jersey Legislature is represented in the State Senate by Parker Space (R, Wantage Township) and in the General Assembly by Dawn Fantasia (R, Franklin) and Mike Inganamort (R, Chester Township).

Sussex County is governed by a Board of County Commissioners whose five members are elected at-large in partisan elections on a staggered basis, with either one or two seats coming up for election each year. At an annual reorganization meeting held in the beginning of January, the board selects a Commissioner Director and Deputy Director from among its members, with day-to-day supervision of the operation of the county delegated to a County Administrator. As of 2025, Sussex County's Commissioners are Director Jill Space (R, Wantage Township, 2025), Deputy Director Chris Carney (R, Frankford Township, 2027), Jack DeGroot (R, Sussex, 2026), William Hayden (I, Branchville, 2025) and Alan Henderson (R, Lafayette Township, 2027).

Constitutional officers elected on a countywide basis are Clerk Jeffrey M. Parrott (R, Wantage Township, 2026), Sheriff Michael F. Strada (R, Hampton Township, 2025) and Surrogate Gary R. Chiusano (R, Frankford Township, 2028).

=== Politics ===
As of June 2023, there were a total of 4,352 registered voters in Frankford Township, of which 758 were registered as Democrats, 2,420 were registered as Republicans and 1,174 were registered as Unaffiliated. Among the township's 2020 Census population, 4,353 persons were registered to vote, with 81% of ballots cast.

United States presidential election results for Frankford Township 2024 2020 2016 2012 2008 2004
Year	Republican		Democratic		Third party(ies)	
Year	No.	%	No.	%	No.	%
2024	2,198	67.14%	1,023	31.25%	53	1.62%
2020	2,285	65.45%	1,138	32.60%	68	1.95%
2016	2,078	68.00%	839	27.45%	139	4.55%
2012	1,901	65.39%	953	32.78%	53	1.82%
2008	2,101	65.82%	1,027	32.17%	64	2.01%
2004	2,092	70.34%	846	28.45%	36	1.21%

Gubernatorial election results for Frankford Township
Year	Republican		Democratic		Third party(ies)	
Year	No.	%	No.	%	No.	%
2025	1,760	66.22%	885	33.30%	13	0.49%
2021	1,757	70.39%	710	28.45%	29	1.16%
2017	1,285	64.31%	614	30.73%	99	4.95%
2013	1,325	71.66%	462	24.99%	62	3.35%
2009	1,602	67.77%	533	22.55%	229	9.69%
2005	1,230	65.04%	570	30.14%	91	4.81%

United States Senate election results for Frankford Township1
Year	Republican		Democratic		Third party(ies)	
Year	No.	%	No.	%	No.	%
2024	2,169	67.34%	978	30.36%	74	2.30%
2018	1,685	67.64%	704	28.26%	102	4.09%
2012	1,803	63.51%	936	32.97%	100	3.52%
2006	1,320	68.11%	541	27.92%	77	3.97%

United States Senate election results for Frankford Township2
Year	Republican		Democratic		Third party(ies)	
Year	No.	%	No.	%	No.	%
2020	2,176	63.79%	1,131	33.16%	104	3.05%
2014	1,066	67.43%	464	29.35%	51	3.23%
2013	928	70.95%	368	28.13%	12	0.92%
2008	2,044	65.64%	940	30.19%	130	4.17%

== Education ==
Students in public school for pre-kindergarten through eighth grade attend the Frankford Township School District, at Frankford School, located in Branchville. Students from Branchville attend the district's school as part of a sending/receiving relationship. As of the 2021–22 school year, the district, comprised of one school, had an enrollment of 505 students and 54.5 classroom teachers (on an FTE basis), for a student–teacher ratio of 9.3:1.

For ninth through twelfth grades, public school students attend High Point Regional High School. Attending the school are students from Branchville, Frankford Township, Lafayette Township, Montague Township, Sussex Borough and from Wantage Township. As of the 2021–22 school year, the high school had an enrollment of 812 students and 72.8 classroom teachers (on an FTE basis), for a student–teacher ratio of 11.2:1. The district is governed by a nine-member board of education; seats on the board are allocated based on the population of the constituent municipalities, with two seats assigned to Frankford Township.

== Transportation ==
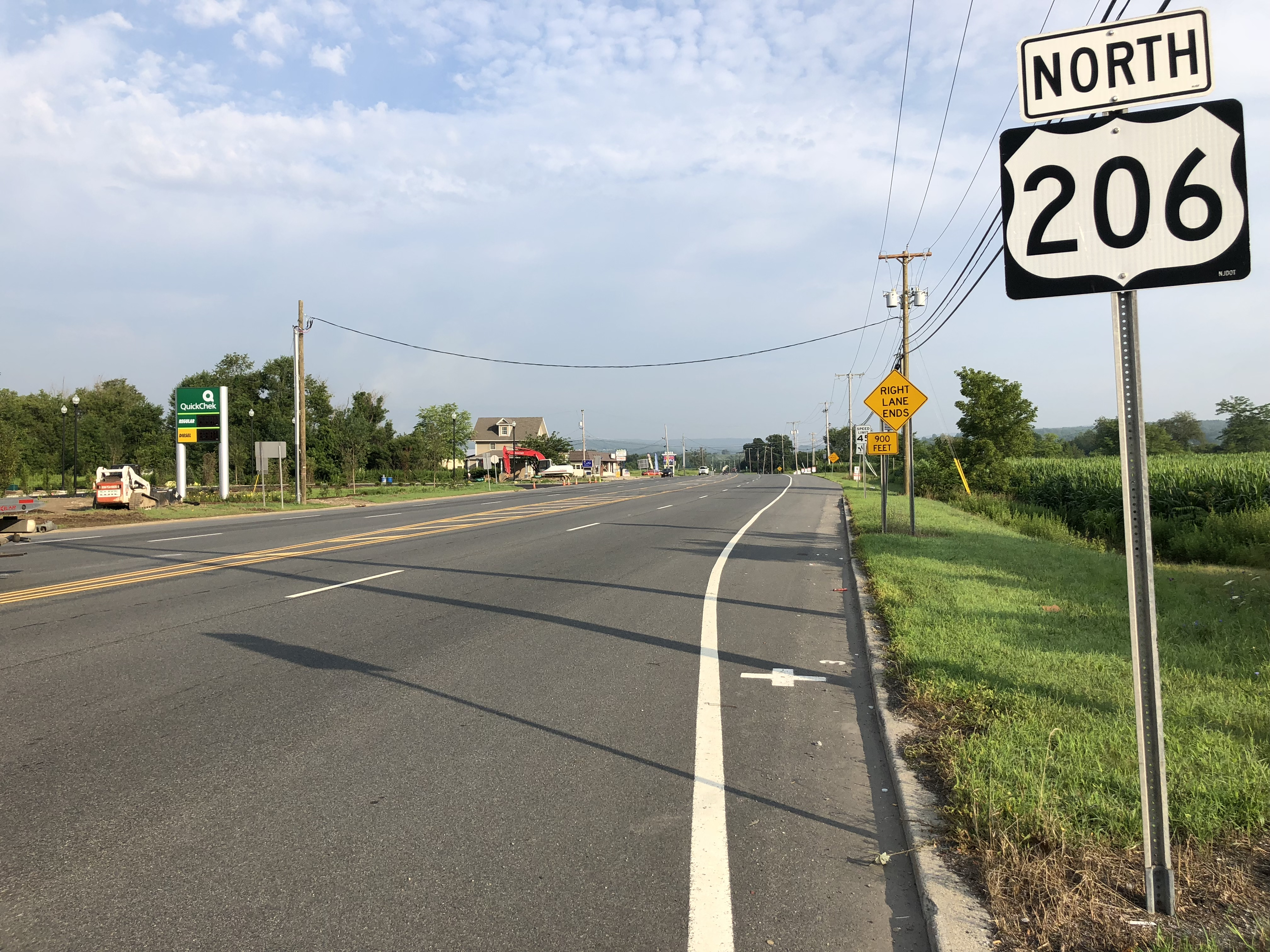
U.S. Route 206 northbound at Route 15 and County Route 565 in Frankford Township

As of May 2010, the township had a total of 96.23 miles (154.87 km) of roadways, of which 60.37 miles (97.16 km) were maintained by the municipality, 30.21 miles (48.62 km) by Sussex County and 5.65 miles (9.09 km) by the New Jersey Department of Transportation.

U.S. Route 206 is the main highway serving Frankford Township. Route 15, County Route 519, County Route 521 and County Route 565 also pass through the township.

== Notable people ==
People who were born in, residents of, or otherwise closely associated with Frankford Township include:

- Gary R. Chiusano (born 1951), member of the New Jersey General Assembly and former mayor
- Russ Van Atta (1906–1986), MLB pitcher who played with the New York Yankees and St. Louis Browns and was later elected as Sheriff of Sussex County
