= Branchville, New Jersey =

Borough in Sussex County, New Jersey, US

- Borough
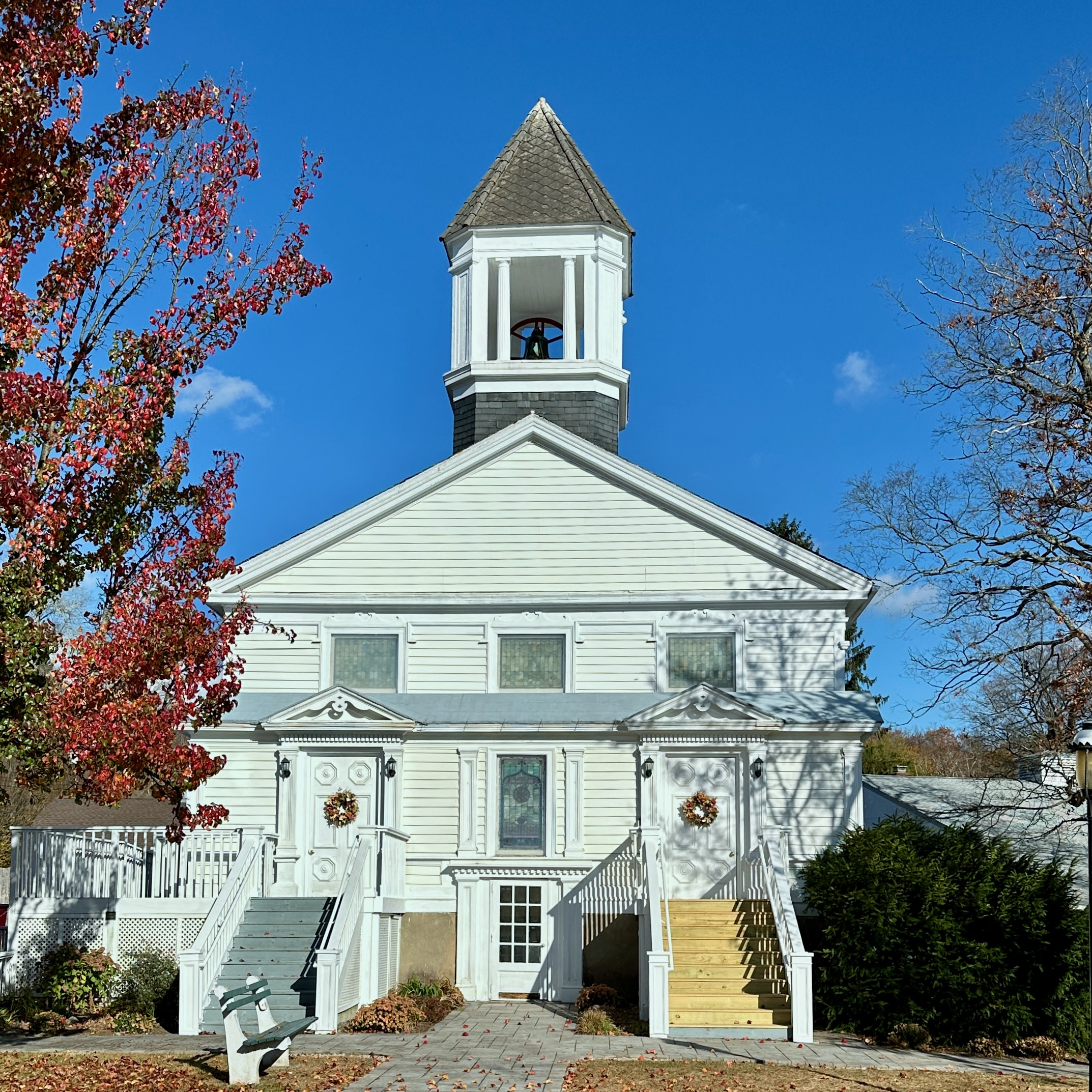
- First Presbyterian Church

- Seal

- Map of Branchville in Sussex County. Inset: Location of Sussex County in New Jersey.

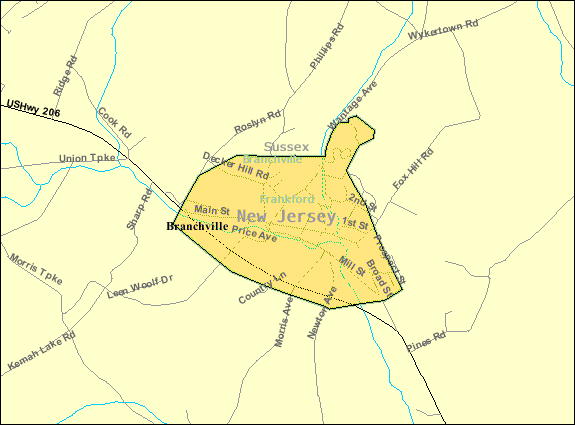
- Census Bureau map of Branchville, New Jersey

- Location in Sussex County Location in New Jersey Location in the United States
- Coordinates: 41.147238°N 74.749042°W
- Country: United States
- State: New Jersey
- County: Sussex
- Incorporated: March 9, 1898
- Named after: Branch of Paulins Kill

Government
  - Type: Borough
  - Body: Borough Council
  - Mayor: Anthony Frato Sr. (D, term ends December 31, 2027)
  - Municipal clerk: Kathryn L. Leissler

Area
  - Total: 0.60 sq mi (1.55 km^{2})
  - Land: 0.59 sq mi (1.54 km^{2})
  - Water: 0.0077 sq mi (0.02 km^{2}) 1.17%
  - Rank: 541st of 565 in state 24th of 24 in county
- Elevation: 554 ft (169 m)

Population (2020)
  - Total: 791
  - Estimate (2023): 808
  - Rank: 543rd of 565 in state 22nd of 24 in county
  - Density: 1,334.3/sq mi (515.2/km^{2})
  - Rank: 352nd of 565 in state 5th of 24 in county
- Time zone: UTC−05:00 (Eastern (EST))
  - Summer (DST): UTC−04:00 (Eastern (EDT))
- ZIP Codes: 07826, 07827, 07890
- Area code: 973
- FIPS code: 3403707300
- GNIS feature ID: 885168
- Website: branchvilleborough.org

Branchville is a borough in Sussex County, in the U.S. state of New Jersey. As of the 2020 United States census, the borough's population was 791, a decrease of 50 (−5.9%) from the 2010 census count of 841, which in turn reflected a decline of 4 (−0.5%) from the 845 counted in the 2000 census. The borough is located in the northernmost region of Sussex County.

Branchville was incorporated as a borough by an act of the New Jersey Legislature on March 9, 1898, from portions of Frankford Township. An additional portion of Frankford Township was annexed as of March 1, 1951. The borough was named for its site at a branch of the Paulins Kill.

== History ==
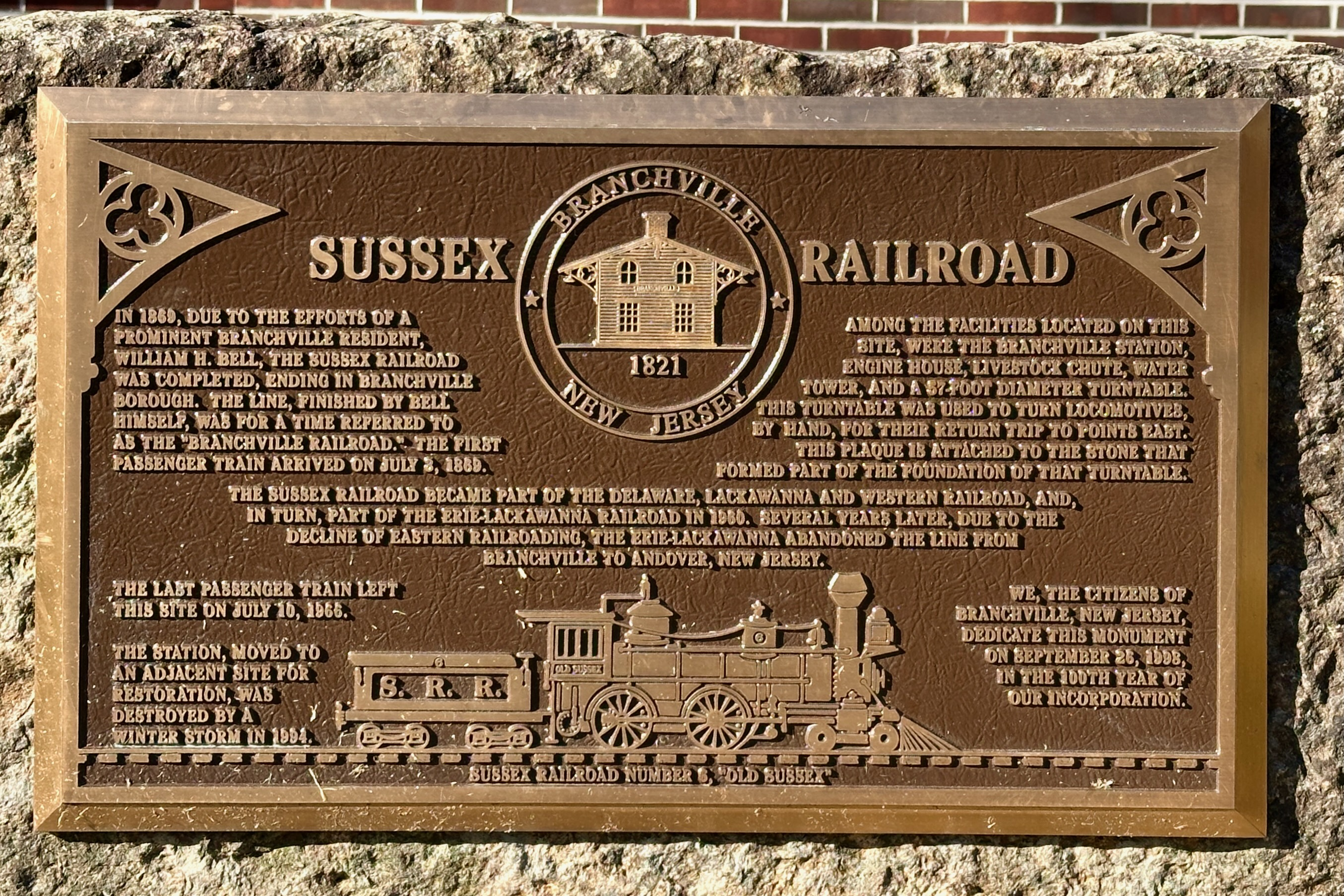
Plaque commemorating the completion of the Sussex Railroad into Branchville

Branchville was established by settlers from Connecticut in the 18th century. It grew quickly and in the 1820s the town was divided into building lots. By the year 1844, it was a well-established community with 32 dwellings, mills, blacksmiths, an academy, a church and a variety of other factories and businesses.

The addition of two water-powered mills and a dam in 1855 furthered the community's prosperity. Energy would later be harnessed from this dam and a second one that was built to supply Branchville with electricity and its own power company.

Extension of rail service on the Sussex Railroad to Branchville in 1869 brought an even greater boon to the community's economic growth. From 1869 to 1871, forty new homes were built. The railroad had made it possible to ship products from the local mills and creameries to larger urban areas to the east. With lake communities nearby, tourism was also spurred by the railroad. As many as six trains a day would bring people from the larger cities to enjoy a country vacation.

== Geography ==
According to the United States Census Bureau, the borough had a total area of 0.60 square miles (1.6 km^{2}), including 0.59 square miles (1.5 km^{2}) of land and 0.01 square miles (0.026 km^{2}) of water (1.17%).

Branchville is an independent municipality completely surrounded by Frankford Township, making it part of 21 pairs of "doughnut towns" in the state, where one municipality entirely surrounds another.

=== Climate ===
This climatic region is typified by large seasonal temperature differences, with warm to hot (and often humid) summers and cold (sometimes severely cold) winters. According to the Köppen Climate Classification system, Branchville has a humid continental climate, abbreviated "Dfb" on climate maps.

=== Geology ===
Branchville is on the Ordovician Martinsburg Formation. This is a shale, slate, and limestone formation created 450 million years ago when a chain of volcanic islands collided with proto North America. The islands went over the North American Plate, creating the Highlands of Sussex County and the Kittatinny Valley. Millions of years of erosion occurred and there was a second event. About 400 million years ago a small continent that was long and thin, collided with proto North America creating folding and faulting. The Silurian Shawangunk conglomerate that was under a shallow sea, lifted due to pressure. The pressure created heat which melted the silica and bonded the quartz and conglomerate together, creating Kittatinny Mountain.

The Wisconsin Glacier covered all of Branchville from 21,000 BCE to 13,000 BCE, covering the top of Kittatinny Mountain. End moraines exist in Stokes State Forest, another just off Route 565 north of the Skylands Park and one about a mile south of Ross's Corner. An esker was created when the glacier retreated due to climate warming. Many ponds and lakes created. Culver Lake was created at this time, as the drainage became blocked. Branchville is drained by Culver's Lake Creek and Dry brook. Dry Creek starts at the Branchville Reservoir, travels south, enters into Culver's Creek in Branchville and eventually empties into the Paulinskill. There is a chain of hills between Dry Creek and Papakatin Creek. These hills are what separate the Paulinskill River drainage system from that of the Wallkill. The drainage divide is just north of Route 206 and the goes northwest toward Branchville Reservoir. Water near Route 206 or south of Route 206 drains into the Paulinskill. Water north of Route 206 drains into the Wallkill River.

== Demographics ==
Historical population
Census	Pop.	Note	%±
1900	526		—
1910	663		26.0%
1920	588		−11.3%
1930	665		13.1%
1940	715		7.5%
1950	810		13.3%
1960	963		18.9%
1970	911		−5.4%
1980	870		−4.5%
1990	851		−2.2%
2000	845		−0.7%
2010	841		−0.5%
2020	791		−5.9%
2023 (est.)	808	▲	2.1%
Population sources: 1900–1920; 1900–1910 1910–1930; 1940–2000; 2010 2020

=== 2010 census ===
The 2010 United States census counted 841 people, 364 households, and 221 families in the borough. The population density was 1,419.2 people per square mile (548.0 people/km^{2}). There were 386 housing units at an average density of 651.4 units per square mile (251.5 units/km^{2}). The racial makeup was 96.43% (811) White, 0.36% (3) Black or African American, 0.36% (3) Native American, 1.07% (9) Asian, 0.00% (0) Pacific Islander, 0.48% (4) from other races, and 1.31% (11) from two or more races. Hispanic or Latino of any race were 3.92% (33) of the population.

Of the 364 households, 28.8% had children under the age of 18; 46.2% were married couples living together; 10.7% had a female householder with no husband present and 39.3% were non-families. Of all households, 34.1% were made up of individuals and 17.0% had someone living alone who was 65 years of age or older. The average household size was 2.30 and the average family size was 2.98.

22.8% of the population were under the age of 18, 7.3% from 18 to 24, 23.3% from 25 to 44, 29.8% from 45 to 64, and 16.8% who were 65 years of age or older. The median age was 42.8 years. For every 100 females, the population had 95.1 males. For every 100 females ages 18 and older there were 91.4 males.

The Census Bureau's 2006–2010 American Community Survey showed that (in 2010 inflation-adjusted dollars) median household income was $56,875 (with a margin of error of +/− $29,887) and the median family income was $84,643 (+/− $16,892). Males had a median income of $61,042 (+/− $20,432) versus $37,955 (+/− $6,402) for females. The per capita income for the borough was $30,851 (+/− $4,509). About 2.6% of families and 2.6% of the population were below the poverty line, including 4.8% of those under age 18 and 2.5% of those age 65 or over.

=== 2000 census ===
As of the 2000 United States census there were 845 people, 354 households, and 225 families residing in the borough. The population density was 1,421.6 inhabitants per square mile (548.9/km^{2}). There were 377 housing units at an average density of 634.3 units per square mile (244.9 units/km^{2}). The racial makeup of the borough was 100.00% White, 0.12% African American, 0.36% Native American, 0.36% Asian, 0.12% from other races, and 0.59% from two or more races. Hispanic or Latino of any race were 1.30% of the population.

There were 354 households, out of which 28.8% had children under the age of 18 living with them, 52.5% were married couples living together, 9.6% had a female householder with no husband present, and 36.4% were non-families. 32.2% of all households were made up of individuals, and 18.1% had someone living alone who was 65 years of age or older. The average household size was 2.37 and the average family size was 3.03.

In the borough the population was spread out, with 24.0% under the age of 18, 4.5% from 18 to 24, 26.4% from 25 to 44, 27.0% from 45 to 64, and 18.1% who were 65 years of age or older. The median age was 42 years. For every 100 females, there were 87.4 males. For every 100 females age 18 and over, there were 82.4 males.

The median income for a household in the borough was $45,855, and the median income for a family was $60,909. Males had a median income of $36,250 versus $27,159 for females. The per capita income for the borough was $22,748. About 4.2% of families and 4.4% of the population were below the poverty line, including 4.9% of those under age 18 and 6.2% of those age 65 or over.

== Economy ==
Selective Insurance, a regional insurance holding company that provides property and casualty insurance products and insurance services, has its headquarters in Branchville.

== Government ==
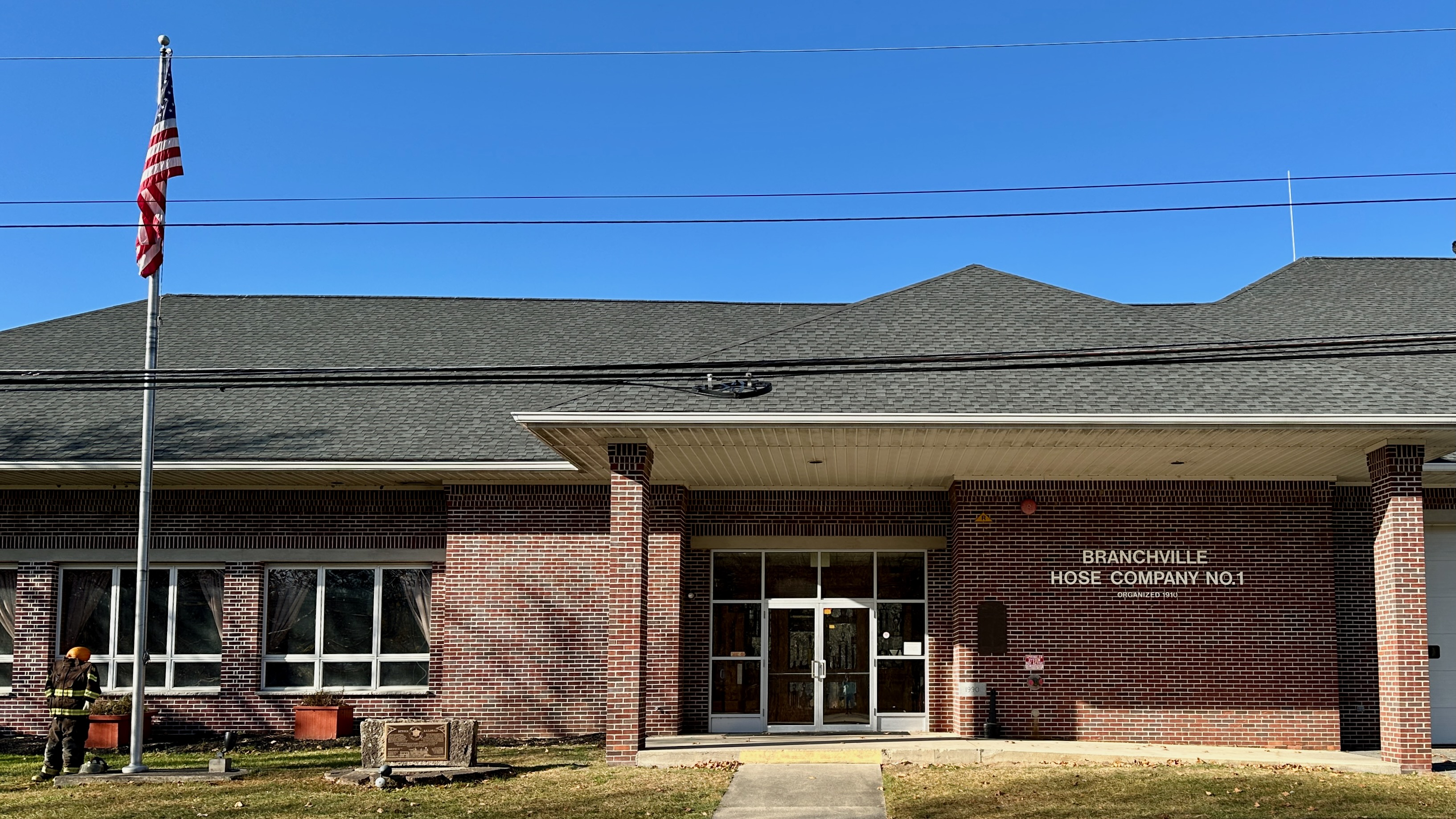
Fire department

=== Local government ===
Branchville is governed under the borough form of New Jersey municipal government, which is used in 218 municipalities (of the 564) statewide, making it the most common form of government in New Jersey. The governing body is comprised of the mayor and the borough council, with all positions elected at-large on a partisan basis as part of the November general election. The mayor is elected directly by the voters to a four-year term of office. The borough council includes six members elected to serve three-year terms on a staggered basis, with two seats coming up for election each year in a three-year cycle. The borough form of government used by Branchville is a "weak mayor / strong council" government in which council members act as the legislative body with the mayor presiding at meetings and voting only in the event of a tie. The mayor can veto ordinances subject to an override by a two-thirds majority vote of the council. The mayor makes committee and liaison assignments for council members, and most appointments are made by the mayor with the advice and consent of the council.

As of 2024, the mayor of Branchville Borough is Democrat Anthony Frato Sr., whose term of office ends December 31, 2027. Members of the Branchville Borough Council are Council President Richard N. Van Stone (R, 2025), Tania Bansemer (R, 2026), Beverley Bathgate (R, 2026), Russell Bellis Jr. (R, 2024), H. Lee Doremus (R, 2025) and Troy C. Orr (R, 2024).

In January 2015, the borough council appointed Steven Schechner to serve the term expiring in December 2018 that had been held by Frank J. San Phillip, who was elected but did not take office for personal reasons; Schechner will serve on an interim basis until the November 2016 general election, when voters will select a candidate to serve the two years remaining in the term of office.

=== Federal, state and county representation ===
Branchville is located in the 5th Congressional District and is part of New Jersey's 24th state legislative district.

For the 119th United States Congress, New Jersey's 5th congressional district is represented by Josh Gottheimer (D, Wyckoff). New Jersey is represented in the United States Senate by Democrats Cory Booker (Newark, term ends 2027) and Andy Kim (Moorestown, term ends 2031).

For the 2026–2027 session, the 24th legislative district of the New Jersey Legislature is represented in the State Senate by Parker Space (R, Wantage Township) and in the General Assembly by Dawn Fantasia (R, Franklin) and Mike Inganamort (R, Chester Township).

Sussex County is governed by a Board of County Commissioners whose five members are elected at-large in partisan elections on a staggered basis, with either one or two seats coming up for election each year. At an annual reorganization meeting held in the beginning of January, the board selects a Commissioner Director and Deputy Director from among its members, with day-to-day supervision of the operation of the county delegated to a County Administrator. As of 2025, Sussex County's Commissioners are Director Jill Space (R, Wantage Township, 2025), Deputy Director Chris Carney (R, Frankford Township, 2027), Jack DeGroot (R, Sussex, 2026), William Hayden (I, Branchville, 2025) and Alan Henderson (R, Lafayette Township, 2027).

Constitutional officers elected on a countywide basis are Clerk Jeffrey M. Parrott (R, Wantage Township, 2026), Sheriff Michael F. Strada (R, Hampton Township, 2025) and Surrogate Gary R. Chiusano (R, Frankford Township, 2028).

=== Politics ===
As of March 2011, there were a total of 556 registered voters in Branchville, of which 75 (13.5% vs. 16.5% countywide) were registered as Democrats, 306 (55.0% vs. 39.3%) were registered as Republicans and 175 (31.5% vs. 44.1%) were registered as Unaffiliated. There were no voters registered to other parties. Among the borough's 2010 Census population, 66.1% (vs. 65.8% in Sussex County) were registered to vote, including 85.7% of those ages 18 and over (vs. 86.5% countywide).

Gubernatorial election results for Branchville
Year	Republican		Democratic		Third party(ies)	
Year	No.	%	No.	%	No.	%
2025	219	56.59%	166	42.89%	2	0.52%
2021	218	61.24%	133	37.36%	5	1.40%
2017	179	60.68%	94	31.86%	22	7.46%
2013	191	72.90%	64	24.43%	7	2.67%
2009	199	68.62%	55	18.97%	36	12.41%
2005	172	61.43%	97	34.64%	11	3.93%

In the 2012 presidential election, Republican Mitt Romney received 259 votes (61.4% vs. 59.4% countywide), ahead of Democrat Barack Obama with 156 votes (37.0% vs. 38.2%) and other candidates with 7 votes (1.7% vs. 2.1%), among the 422 ballots cast by the borough's 583 registered voters, for a turnout of 72.4% (vs. 68.3% in Sussex County). In the 2008 presidential election, Republican John McCain received 253 votes (60.4% vs. 59.2% countywide), ahead of Democrat Barack Obama with 159 votes (37.9% vs. 38.7%) and other candidates with 4 votes (1.0% vs. 1.5%), among the 419 ballots cast by the borough's 578 registered voters, for a turnout of 72.5% (vs. 76.9% in Sussex County). In the 2004 presidential election, Republican George W. Bush received 277 votes (65.5% vs. 63.9% countywide), ahead of Democrat John Kerry with 137 votes (32.4% vs. 34.4%) and other candidates with 7 votes (1.7% vs. 1.3%), among the 423 ballots cast by the borough's 546 registered voters, for a turnout of 77.5% (vs. 77.7% in the whole county).

United States presidential election results for Branchville 2024 2020 2016 2012 2008 2004
Year	Republican		Democratic		Third party(ies)	
Year	No.	%	No.	%	No.	%
2024	308	63.24%	171	35.11%	8	1.64%
2020	277	58.94%	185	39.36%	8	1.70%
2016	273	64.39%	135	31.84%	16	3.77%
2012	259	61.37%	156	36.97%	7	1.66%
2008	253	60.82%	159	38.22%	4	0.96%
2004	277	65.80%	137	32.54%	7	1.66%

In the 2013 gubernatorial election, Republican Chris Christie received 72.9% of the vote (191 cast), ahead of Democrat Barbara Buono with 24.4% (64 votes), and other candidates with 2.7% (7 votes), among the 265 ballots cast by the borough's 566 registered voters (3 ballots were spoiled), for a turnout of 46.8%. In the 2009 gubernatorial election, Republican Chris Christie received 199 votes (68.6% vs. 63.3% countywide), ahead of Democrat Jon Corzine with 55 votes (19.0% vs. 25.7%), Independent Chris Daggett with 32 votes (11.0% vs. 9.1%) and other candidates with 4 votes (1.4% vs. 1.3%), among the 290 ballots cast by the borough's 542 registered voters, yielding a 53.5% turnout (vs. 52.3% in the county).

United States Senate election results for Branchville1
Year	Republican		Democratic		Third party(ies)	
Year	No.	%	No.	%	No.	%
2024	287	61.59%	171	36.70%	8	1.72%
2018	224	62.92%	116	32.58%	16	4.49%
2012	235	58.46%	155	38.56%	12	2.99%
2006	187	66.08%	87	30.74%	9	3.18%

United States Senate election results for Branchville2
Year	Republican		Democratic		Third party(ies)	
Year	No.	%	No.	%	No.	%
2020	259	56.43%	190	41.39%	10	2.18%
2014	141	61.04%	88	38.10%	2	0.87%
2013	113	58.55%	70	36.27%	10	5.18%
2008	252	62.69%	134	33.33%	16	3.98%

== Education ==
Students in public school for pre-kindergarten through eighth grade attend the Frankford Township School District, located in Branchville, as part of a sending/receiving relationship. As of the 2021–22 school year, the district, comprised of one school, had an enrollment of 505 students and 54.5 classroom teachers (on an FTE basis), for a student–teacher ratio of 9.3:1.

For ninth through twelfth grades, public school students from Branchville attend High Point Regional High School. Also attending the school are students from Frankford Township, Lafayette Township, Montague Township, Sussex Borough and Wantage Township (where the school is located). As of the 2021–22 school year, the high school had an enrollment of 812 students and 72.8 classroom teachers (on an FTE basis), for a student–teacher ratio of 11.2:1.

== Transportation ==
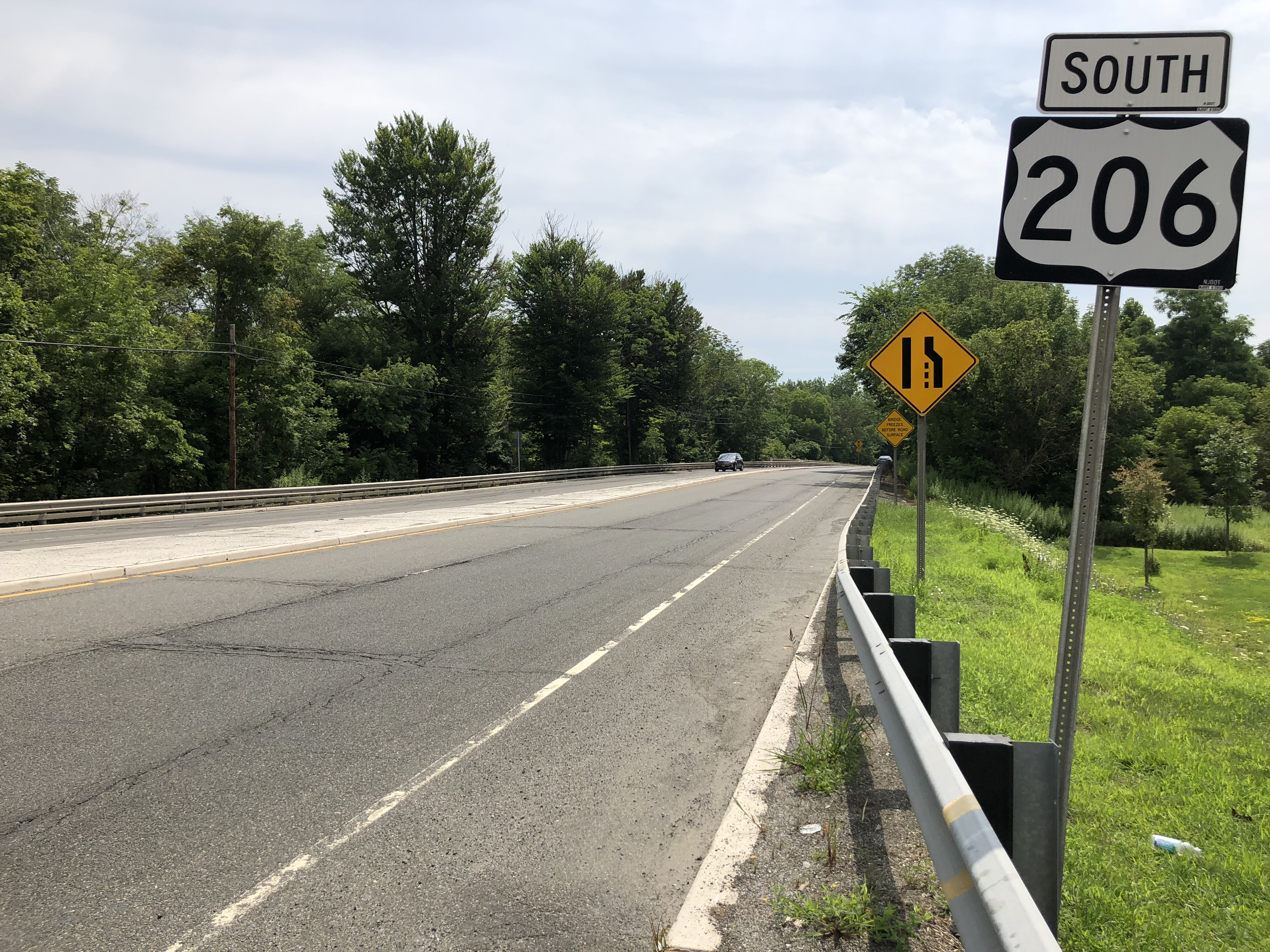
U.S. Route 206 southbound in Branchville

As of November 2014, the borough had a total of 6.30 miles (10.14 km) of roadways, of which 2.79 miles (4.49 km) were maintained by the municipality, 2.36 miles (3.80 km) by Sussex County and 1.15 miles (1.85 km) by the New Jersey Department of Transportation.

U.S. Route 206 is the main highway serving Branchville. County Route 519 also traverses the borough.

== Notable people ==
People who were born in, residents of, or otherwise closely associated with Branchville include:

- David Zabriskie (born 1986), retired amateur wrestler and current wrestling coach
