= Hamburg School District =

Hamburg School District may refer to a school district in the United States:

- Hamburg School District (Arkansas)
- Hamburg Community School District (Iowa)
- Hamburg School District (New Jersey)
- Hamburg Central School District (New York)
