= Springdale, Sussex County, New Jersey =

Populated place in Sussex County, New Jersey, US

Springdale, New Jersey
- Unincorporated community
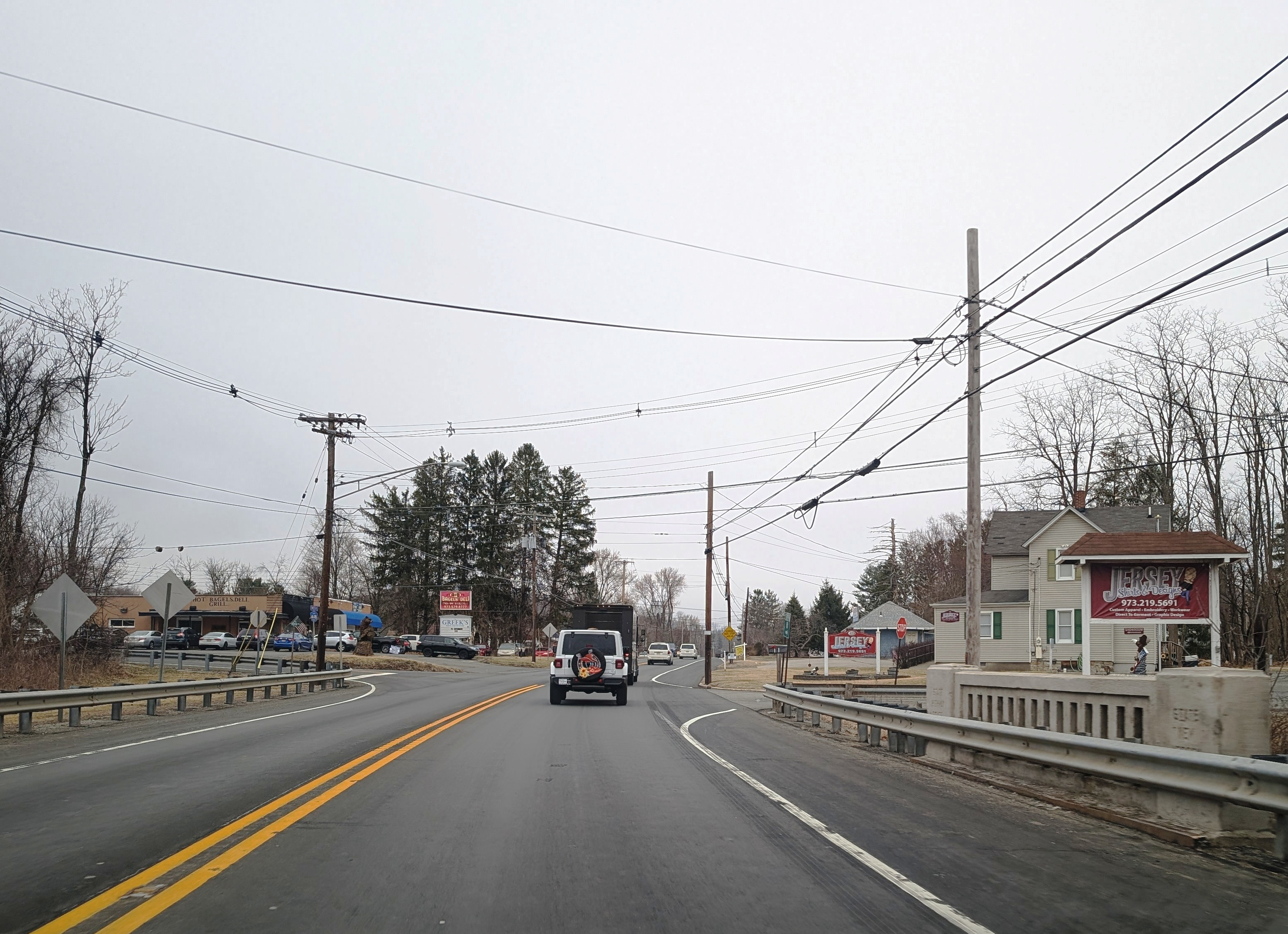
- US 206 northbound in Springdale

- Location within Sussex County, New Jersey Location within New Jersey Location within the United States
- Coordinates: 41°01′13″N 74°46′09″W
- Country: United States
- State: New Jersey
- County: Sussex
- Township: Andover
- Elevation: 587 ft (179 m)
- Time zone: UTC−05:00 (Eastern (EST))
  - Summer (DST): UTC−04:00 (EDT)
- GNIS feature ID: 880814

Springdale is an unincorporated community in Andover Township, in Sussex County, in the U.S. state of New Jersey.

It is located on U.S. Route 206, approximately 3 mi (4.8 km) south of Newton. Newton Airport is located there.

The Pequest River flows through Springdale.

== History ==
In 1872, it was noted that Springdale had a mill, eight or ten dwellings, and a school that was used for religious services on the sabbath "by ministers of several denominations alternately".
