= Sussex County, New Jersey =

County in New Jersey, United States

- County
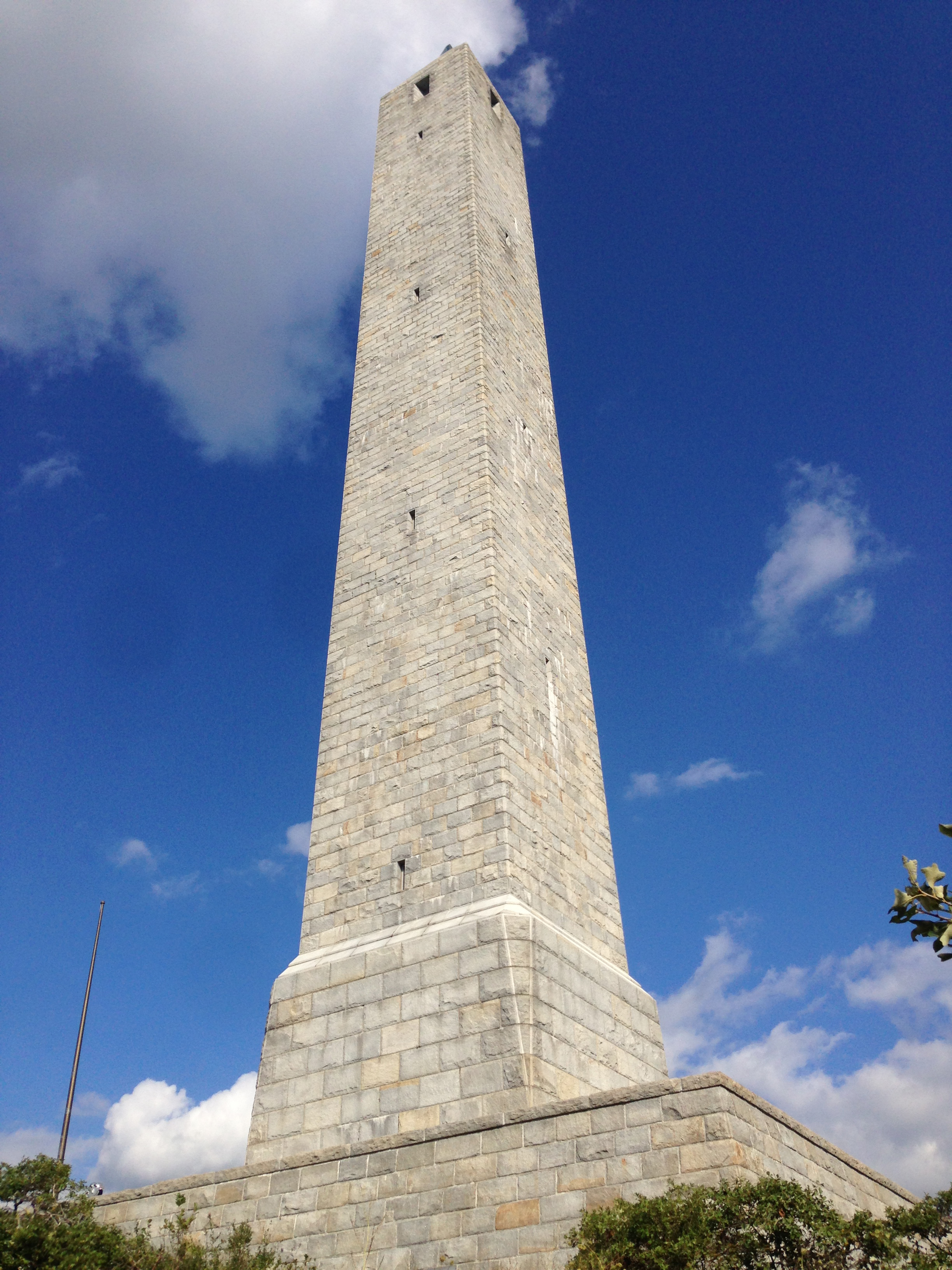
- High Point Monument, situated at the highest point in the U.S. state of New Jersey

- Flag Seal Logo

- Location within the U.S. state of New Jersey
- Interactive map of Sussex County, New Jersey
- Coordinates: 41.14°N 74.69°W
- Country: United States
- State: New Jersey
- Founded: June 8, 1753
- Named for: Sussex, England
- Seat: Newton
- Largest municipality: Vernon Township (population and area)

Government
  - Commissioner director: Chris Carney (R)

Area
  - Total: 535.54 sq mi (1,387.0 km^{2})
  - Land: 518.66 sq mi (1,343.3 km^{2})
  - Water: 16.88 sq mi (43.7 km^{2}) 3.2%

Population (2020)
  - Total: 144,221
  - Estimate (2025): 148,063 ▲
  - Density: 278.06/sq mi (107.36/km^{2})
- Time zone: UTC−5 (Eastern)
  - Summer (DST): UTC−4 (EDT)
- Congressional districts: 5th, 7th
- Website: sussex.nj.us

Sussex County (/ˈsʌsɪks/) is the northernmost county in the U.S. state of New Jersey. Its county seat is Newton. It is part of the New York metropolitan area and is part of New Jersey's Skylands Region. As of the 2020 census, the county was the state's 17th-most-populous county, with a population of 144,221, a decrease of 5,044 (−3.4%) from the 2010 census count of 149,265, which in turn reflected an increase of 5,099 (+3.5%) over the 144,166 persons at the 2000 census. The United States Census Bureau's Population Estimates Program estimated a 2025 population of 148,063, an increase of 3,842 (+2.7%) from the 2020 decennial census. Based on 2020 census data, Vernon Township was the county's largest in both population and area, with a population of 22,358 and covering an area of 70.59 square miles (182.8 km^{2}). The county is part of the North Jersey region of the state.

In 2015, the county had a per capita personal income of $55,497, the ninth-highest in New Jersey and ranked 220th of 3,113 counties in the United States. As of 2010 the Bureau of Economic Analysis ranked the county as having the 131st-highest per capita income ($49,207) of the 3,113 counties in the United States (and the ninth-highest in the state).

== Etymology ==
The county was established in 1753 from portions of Morris County and named after the county of Sussex in England.

== History ==
The area of Sussex County and its surrounding region was occupied for approximately 8,000–13,000 years by succeeding cultures of indigenous peoples. The Munsee Indians inhabited the region at the time of European encounter. The Munsee were a loosely organized division of the Lenape (or Lenni Lenape), a Native American people also called "Delaware Indians" after their historic territory along the Delaware River. The Lenape inhabited the Mid-Atlantic coastal areas and inland along the Hudson and Delaware rivers. The Munsee spoke a very distinct dialect of the Lenape and inhabited a region bounded by the Hudson River, the headwaters of the Delaware River and the Susquehanna River, and south to the Lehigh River and Conewago Creek. As a result of disruption following the French and Indian War (1756–1763), the American Revolutionary War (1775–1783), and later Indian removals from the eastern United States, the main Lenape groups now live in Ontario in Canada, and in Wisconsin and Oklahoma in the United States.

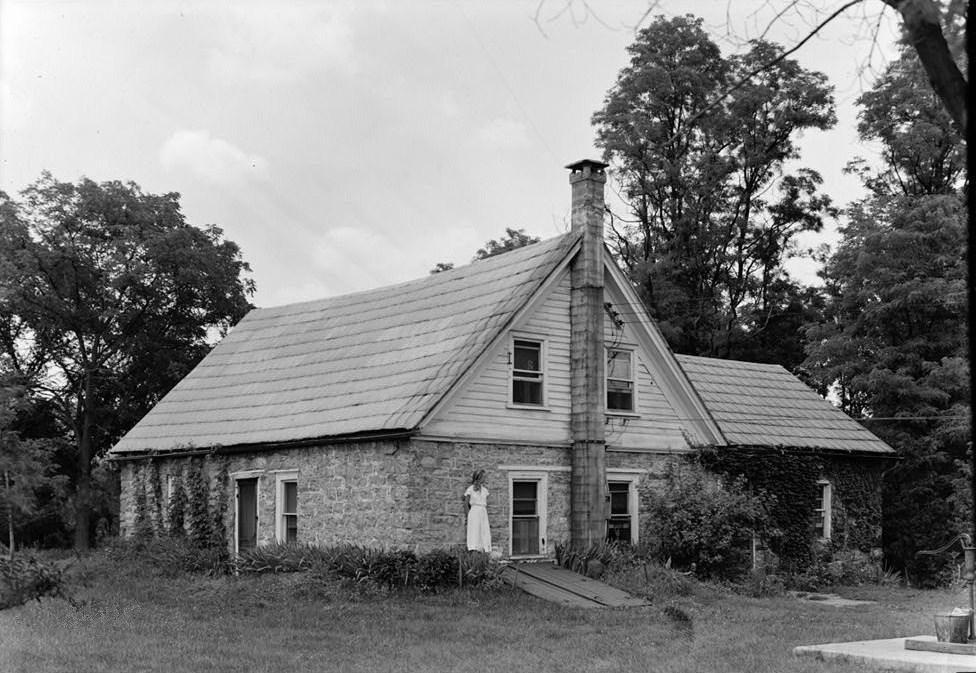
The Westbrook-Bell House in Sandyston Township is the oldest house still-standing in Sussex County, built by Dutch settler Johannes Westbrook in the early 18th century.

As early as 1690, Dutch and French Huguenot colonists from towns along the Hudson River Valley in New York began permanently settling in the Upper Delaware Valley (known as the "Minisink"). The route these Dutch settlers had taken was the path of an old Indian trail and became the route of the Old Mine Road and stretches of present-date U.S. Route 209. These Dutch settlers penetrated the Minisink Valley and settled as far south as the Delaware Water Gap, by 1731 this valley had been incorporated as Walpack Precinct. Throughout the 18th century, immigrants from the Rheinland Palatinate in Germany and Switzerland fled religious wars and poverty to arrive in Philadelphia and New York City. Several German families began leaving Philadelphia to settle along river valleys in Northwestern New Jersey and Pennsylvania's Lehigh Valley in the 1720s, spreading north into Sussex County in the 1740s and 1750s as additional German emigrants arrived. Also during this time, Scottish settlers from Elizabethtown and Perth Amboy, and English settlers from these cities, Long Island, Connecticut and Massachusetts, came to New Jersey and moved up the tributaries of the Passaic and Raritan rivers, settling in the eastern sections of present-day Sussex and Warren counties.

By the 1750s, residents of this area began to petition colonial authorities for a new county to be formed; they complained of the inconvenience of long travel to conduct business with the government and the courts. By this time, four large townships had been created in this sparsely populated Northwestern region: Walpack Township (before 1731), Greenwich Township (before 1738), Hardwick Township (1750) and Newtown Township (1751). On June 8, 1753, Sussex County was created from these four municipalities, which had been part of Morris County when Morris stretched over all of northwestern New Jersey. Sussex County at this time encompassed present-day Sussex and Warren Counties and its boundaries were drawn by the New York-New Jersey border to the north, the Delaware River to the west, and the Musconetcong River to the south and east.

After several decades of debate over where to hold the sessions of the county's courts, the state legislature eventually voted to divide Sussex County in two, using a line drawn from the juncture of the Flat Brook and Delaware River in a southeasterly direction to the Musconetcong River running through the Yellow Frame Presbyterian Church in present-day Fredon Township (then part of Hardwick). On November 20, 1824, Warren County was created from the southern territory of the Sussex County.

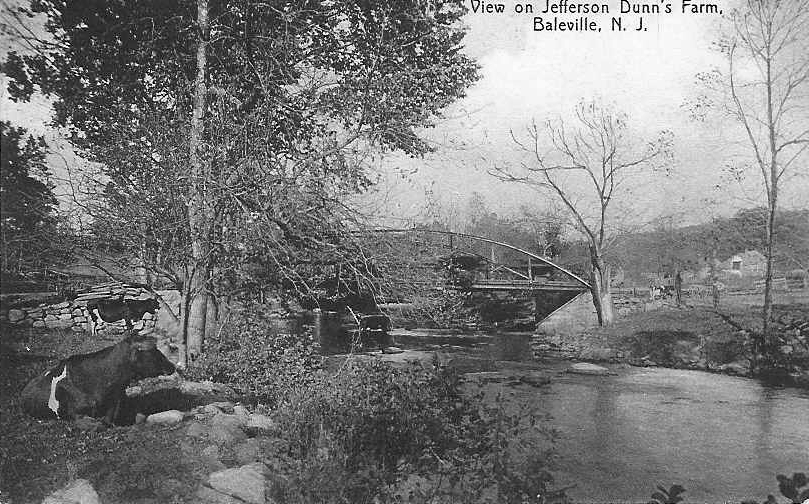
A 1905 postcard view from "Jefferson Dunn's Farm" along the Paulins Kill in the Baleville section of Hampton Township. The Kittatinny Valley supported significant agriculture including dairy farms, and the Paulins Kill powered many grist mills.

Throughout the 18th, 19th, and 20th centuries, Sussex County's economy was largely centered around agriculture and the mining of iron and zinc ores. Early settlers established farms whose operations were chiefly focused towards subsistence agriculture. Because of geological constraints, Sussex County's agricultural production was centered around dairy farming. Several farms had orchards—typically apples and peaches—and surplus fruit and grains were often distilled or brewed into alcoholic beverages (hard ciders, applejack and fruit brandies). This was the economic model until the mid-19th century when advances in food preservation and the introduction of railroads (e.g. the Sussex Railroad) into the area allowed Sussex County to transport farm products throughout the region. Railroads also promoted the building of factories as companies relocated to the area at the end of the 19th century—including that of the H.W. Merriam Shoe Company (1873) in Newton.

The Highlands Region of Northwestern New Jersey has proven to possess rich deposits of iron ore. In the mid 18th century, several entrepreneurial colonists began mining iron in area around Andover, Hamburg, and Franklin present-day Sussex County and establishing forges and furnaces to create pig iron and bar iron. During the American Revolution, the Quartermaster Department of the Continental Army complained to Congress of difficulties in acquiring iron to support the war effort and the Congress ordered two colonels, Benjamin Flower and Thomas Maybury to take possession of the iron works at Andover in order to equip General Washington's army. During the middle of the 19th century, under the management of Cooper and Hewitt, the Andover mine produced 50,000 tons of iron ore each year. The firm manufactured railroad rails and the country's first structural steel, which and led to the building of railroads and commercial development in the county. Iron from the Andover mines was fashioned into cable wire for the bridge built at Niagara Falls and for the beams used to rebuild Princeton University's Nassau Hall in Princeton, New Jersey after a fire undermined the structure in 1855. During the American Civil War, Andover iron found its way into rifle barrels and cannonballs just as it had during the Revolution years before.

As deposits were depleted, the iron mining industry began to diminish by the mid-19th century. During the late 19th century, prolific American inventor Thomas Edison began to explore the commercial opportunities of processing poor-quality low-grade iron ore to combat the growing scarcity of iron deposits in the United States. He began to purchase mining companies in Sussex County in the 1880s and consolidating their assets. He developed a process of crushing and milling iron-bearing minerals and separating iron ore from the material through large electromagnets, and built one of the world's largest ore-crushing mills near Ogdensburg. Completed in 1889, the factory contained three giant electromagnets and was intended to process up to 1200 tons of iron ore every day. However, technical difficulties repeatedly thwarted production. However, in the 1890s, richer soft-grade iron ore deposits located in Minnesota's Iron Range rendered Edison's Ogdensburg operation unprofitable and he closed the works in 1900. Edison adapted the process and machinery for the cement industry and invested in producing Portland Cement in other locations.

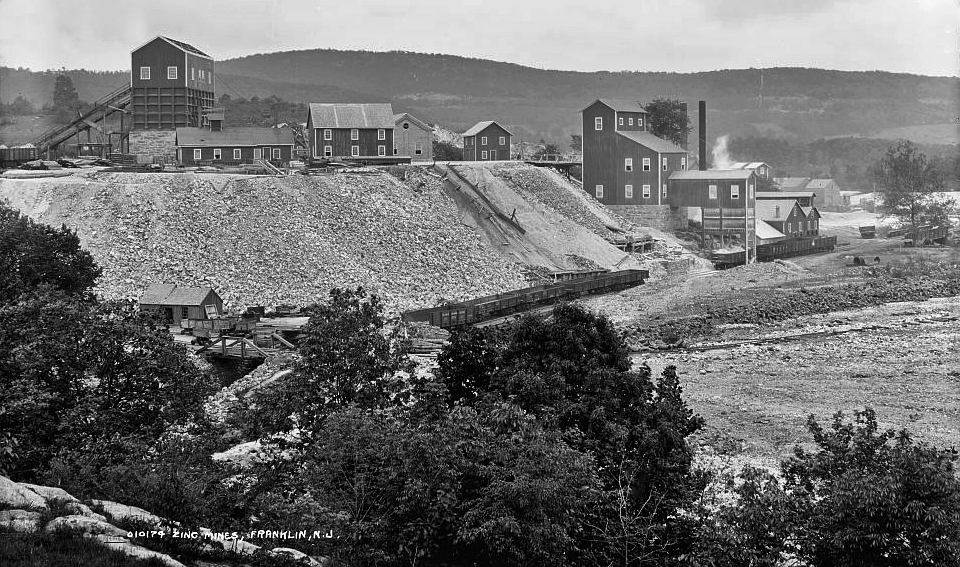
The Franklin Furnace mines and processing plant of the New Jersey Zinc Company in Franklin Borough (circa 1890–1901). Zinc mining brought thousands of Irish, South American, and Eastern European immigrants to Sussex County in the late 19th and early 20th centuries.

In the early 19th century, Samuel Fowler (1779–1844) settled in Franklin Furnace (now Franklin) to open up a medical practice, but is largely known for his interest in mineralogy which led to his developing commercial uses for zinc and for discovery of several rare minerals (chiefly various ores of zinc). Many of these zinc minerals are known for fluorescing in vivid colors when exposed to ultraviolet light. Because of both the rich deposits and many of these minerals are not found anywhere else on earth, Franklin is known as the "Fluorescent Mineral Capitol of the World". Fowler, who later briefly served in elected political office, operated the local iron works and bought several abandoned zinc and iron mines in the area. Shortly after his death, two companies were created to exploit the iron and zinc deposits in this region; they acquired the rights to Fowler's holdings in Franklin and nearby Sterling Hill. These companies later merged to form the New Jersey Zinc Corporation (today known as Horsehead Industries). At this time, Russian, Chilean, British, Irish, Hungarian and Polish immigrants came to Franklin to work in the mines, and the population of Franklin swelled from 500 (in 1897) to over 3,000 (in 1913). Declining deposits in the Franklin area, the expense of pumping groundwater from mine shafts, tax disputes and misdirected investments by the company led to the abandonment of the mines. Today, both the Franklin and Sterling Hill mines are operated as museums.

Beginning in the 1950s and 1960s, construction or improvements of Interstate 80, Route 181 and Route 23 triggered rapid growth to Sussex County. Since 1950, the population nearly quadrupled from 34,423 people to 130,943 people in 1990. This has caused Sussex County to begin developing into a light suburban atmosphere, instead of the sparsely populated rural region it once was, especially in the eastern half of the county.

== Geology ==
Around 450 million years ago, the Martinsburg Shale was uplifted when a chain of volcanic islands collided with proto North America. These islands slid over the North American plate, and deposited rock on top of the plate, forming the Highlands and Kittatinny Valley. At that time the western part of Sussex County was under a shallow inland sea. Fossils of sea shells and fish can be found west of the Kittatinny ridge. Then approximately 400 million years ago, a small, narrow continent collided with North America. Pressure from the collision, created heat in the bed rock which folded and faulted the Silurian Shawangunk Conglomerate that was under the shallow sea. The pressure created intense heat, melted the quartzite, and allowed it to bend, creating an uplift. as cooling occurred this cemented the quartz pebbles and conglomerate together. This is how the Kittatinny Ridge was created. The strike from this continent was from the south east, this is why the Kittatinny ridge is on a northeast–southwest axis. The Wisconsin glacier which covered the entire county from 23,000 B.C to 13,000 B.C. created many lakes and streams. The glacier covered Kittatinny mountain.

As climate warmed around 13,000 B.C., the area was first a tundra with lichens and mosses. After a few thousand years, coniferous forests began to grow. As climate grew warmer around 8000 B.C., deciduous forests began to grow with nut trees such as oak, and maple. Around 3000 B.C. other nut bearing trees began to grow such as hickory, butternut, walnut and beech. This allowed the Paleo Indian populations to increase. The county is drained by the Paulinskill River, the Flatbrook, which drain into the Delaware River, the Wallkill River which flows north to the Hudson River. There are many smaller creeks that drain into these water sheds.

=== Physiographic provinces ===
Sussex County is located within two of New Jersey's physiographic provinces: (1) The Ridge and Valley Appalachians, and (2) the New York-New Jersey Highlands regions.

The features of the Ridge and Valley province were created approximately 400 million years ago during the Ordovician period and Appalachian orogeny—by a continent striking North America the creating Kittatinny Mountain, Blue Mountain, and the Appalachian Mountains. This physiographic province occupies approximately two-thirds of the county's area (the county's western and central sections) dominated by Kittatinny Mountain and the Kittatinny Valley. This province's contour is characterized by long, even ridges with long, continuous valleys in between that generally run parallel from southwest to northeast. This region is largely formed by sedimentary rock.

The New York-New Jersey Highlands, or Highlands region, located in the county's eastern section is older. An extension of the Reading Prong formation stretching from Pennsylvania to Connecticut, the Highlands were created from geological forces created from when a small continent went over the North American plate. This rock created the highlands of Sussex County. Precambrian igneous and metamorphic rock approximately 500 million years ago. The watersheds within the Highlands provide fresh water resources for millions of residents in New Jersey and the New York City Metropolitan Area. Because of this, the region was protected by the New Jersey Legislature and Governor Jim McGreevey under the Highlands Water Protection and Planning Act enacted in 2004. This act sought to protect these water resources from development by promoting open space and farmland preservation, creating new recreational parks, and consolidating the regulatory authority over land use planning in a regional planning commission known as the Highlands Council.

=== Mountains and valleys ===
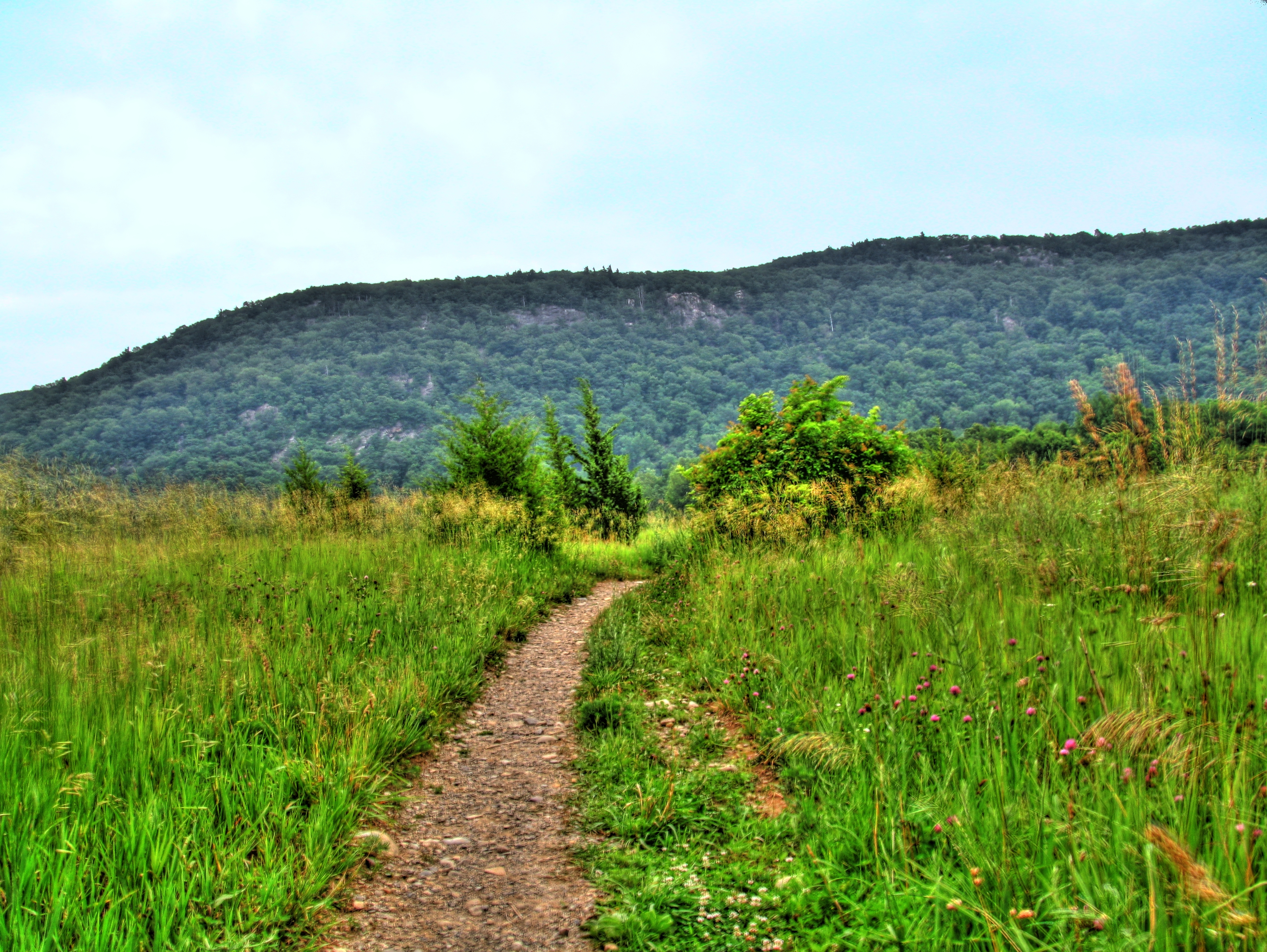
As seen from the Appalachian Trail in Vernon Township, Wawayanda Mountain rises to an elevation 1,448 feet (441 m) above the watershed of Pochuck Creek (also known as Vernon Valley)

The Delaware River forms the western and northwestern boundary of Sussex County. This region is known as the Upper Delaware Valley and historically as the Minisink or Minisink Valley. Elevations in the regions along the river range from 300 to 500 feet (91 to 152 m).

Kittatinny Mountain is the dominant geological feature in the western section of the county. It is part of the Appalachian Mountains, and part of a ridge that continues as the Blue Mountain in Eastern Pennsylvania, and as Shawangunk Ridge in New York to the north. It begins in New Jersey as the eastern half of the Delaware Water Gap, and runs northeast to southwest along the Delaware River. Elevations range from 1,200 to 1,800 feet (370 to 550 m) and attains a maximum elevation of 1,803 feet (550 m) at High Point, in Montague Township. Between Kittatinny Mountain and the Delaware River is the Wallpack Ridge, a smaller, narrow ridge spanning 25 miles (40 km) in length from the Walpack Bend near Flatbrookville north to Port Jervis, New York. Wallpack Ridge encloses the watershed of the Flat Brook and its two main tributaries Little Flat Brook and Big Flat Brook, and ranges in elevation from 500 to 900 feet (150 to 270 m) and reaching its highest elevation at 928 feet (283 m).

The Kittatinny Valley lies to the east of Kittatinny Mountain and ends with the Highlands in the east. It is largely a region of rolling hills and flat valley floors. Elevations in this valley range from 400 to 1,000 feet (120 to 300 m). It is part of the Great Appalachian Valley running from eastern Canada to northern Alabama. This valley is shared by three major watersheds—the Wallkill River, with its tributaries Pochuck Creek and Papakating Creek flowing north; and the Paulins Kill watershed and Pequest River watershed flowing southwest. This valley floor consists of shale and slate (part of the Ordovician Martinsburg Formation) and of limestone (part of the Jacksonburg Formation). Several parties have argued about the possibility of natural gas extraction in the region's Martinsburg and Utica shale formations, similar to the Marcellus Shale formations to the West in Pennsylvania and New York. Of special interest is Rutan Hill, a 440-million-year-old patch of igneous rock known as nepheline syenite. This site, north of Beemerville in Wantage Township, was once an ancient volcano—the only extant dormant volcano site in the state.

Dividing the Kittatinny Valley (and the Ridge and Valley Province) from the Highlands region is a narrow fault of Hardyston Quartzite. Many of the mountains in the Highlands are not part of a solid, linear ridge and tend to randomly rise from the surrounding land as the result of folds, faults and intrusions. Elevations in the Highlands region range from 1,000 to 1,500 feet. The more prominent mountains in this area are Hamburg Mountain (elevation: 1,495 feet (456 m)), Wawayanda Mountain (elevation: 1,448 feet (441 m)), Sparta Mountain (elevation: 1,232 feet (376 m)) and Pochuck Mountain (elevation: 1,194 feet (364 m)) which form a ridge along the county's eastern flank.

=== Rivers and watersheds ===
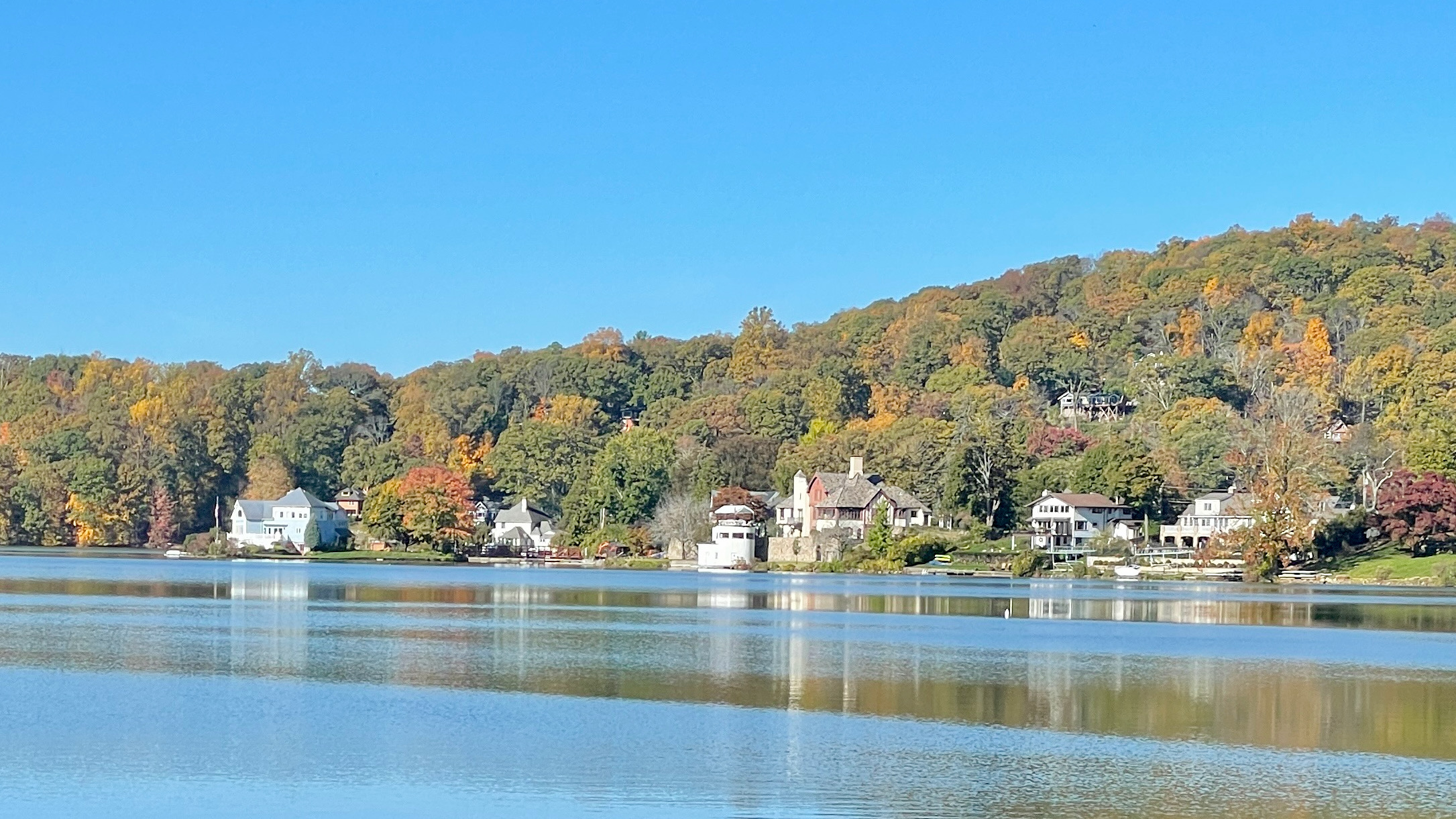
Lake Mohawk, source of the Wallkill River

Sussex County's rivers and watersheds flow in three directions; north to the Hudson River, west and south to the Delaware River, and east toward Newark Bay.

- Wallkill River is an 88.3-mile-long (142.1 km) river starting at its source at Lake Mohawk in Sparta Township drains north into Rondout Creek, a tributary of the Hudson River. The Wallkill River drains a 785 square miles (2,030 km^{2}) watershed.
- Pochuck Creek is an 8.1-mile-long (13.0 km) creek flowing north into the Wallkill River.
- Papakating Creek is a 20.1-mile-long (32.3 km) creek in the north central region of the county beginning in Frankford Township also drains into the Wallkill.
- Clove Creek is a 12.0-mile-long (19.3 km) creek that flows into the Papakating Creek near Lewisburg in Wantage Township.
- The Flat Brook is a 11.6-mile-long (18.7 km) creek flowing through Walpack and Sandyston Townships, joins the Delaware River at the Walpack Bend. It has two main tributaries: the Little Flat Brook whose length is 12.6-mile-long (20.3 km) and Big Flat Brook whose length is 16.5-mile-long (26.6 km).
- The Paulins Kill is a 41.6-mile-long (66.9 km) river with its two branches: the West Branch is fed by Bear Swamp, Lake Owassa, Culver's Lake, and the Dry Brook in Frankford Township, the Main or East Branch starting at Newton combining near Augusta to flow southwest through Hampton, Stillwater, Hardwick, Blairstown, and Knowlton townships to join the Delaware River near the Delaware Water Gap. The Paulins Kill drains a 176.85 square miles (458.0 km^{2}) watershed.
- The Pequest River is a 35.7-mile-long (57.5 km) beginning near Newton and Springdale and flowing through in Andover and Green Township, then through Warren County before joining the Delaware near Belvidere.
- The Musconetcong River is a 45.7-mile-long (73.5 km) river beginning at Lake Hopatcong, forms the eastern border between Warren County and Morris and Hunterdon Counties. Its main tributaries are Lubbers Run and Punkhorn Creek.
- Small sections of eastern Sussex County drain into the watersheds of the Pequannock River, Passaic River, and Rockaway River which end in Newark Bay.

Historically, these rivers and streams were used to power various types of mills (i.e. grist mills, fulling mills, etc.), transport goods to market, and later to generate electric power (after 1880). Today, these rivers are chiefly used in local recreational activities—including canoeing and fishing. The Fish Culture Unit of the New Jersey Division of Fish and Wildlife stocks these waterways each year with various species of trout. Some of these rivers—especially the Flat Brook, Paulins Kill and Pequest—have become well known as trout streams and for their suitability for fly-fishing. The Flat Brook and its tributary the Big Flat Brook are regarded as the state's premiere trout stream.

=== Soils ===
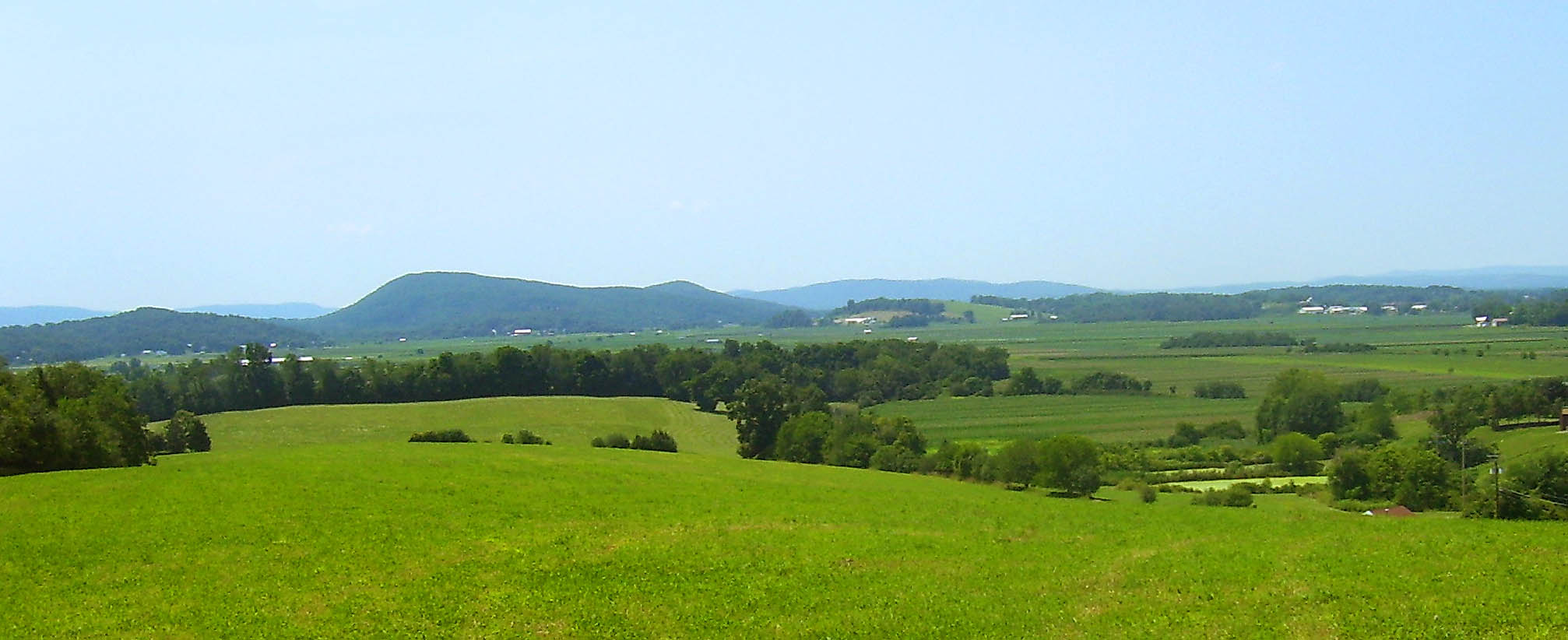
The "Black Dirt Region" is a 26,000-acre (11,000-hectare) area shared by Sussex County and Orange County, New York along the banks of Wallkill River. Known as the "Drowned Lands" in the 19th century, this region's highly organic muck soil supports local vegetable and sod farming, and onion farming at its height reported crop yields of 30,000 pounds per acre (4,800 kg/ha).

According to the Natural Resource Conservation Service, Sussex County soils are derived from parent materials that are largely till and glaciofluvial deposits, alluvium, and organic matter deposits. Till is the rock of soil material transported or deposited by glacial ice. In this case, the most recent glaciation (i.e. the last ice age), the Wisconsinian continental glacier, deposited a till plain composed of ground and recessional moraines. This glaciation reached its maximum extent roughly 22,000 years ago. Glaciofluvial deposits (or "outwash") are rock and soil materials that melting glaciers deposit as the glacier recedes. Alluvium is materials that are deposited by floodwaters from engorged bodies of water—chiefly streams and rivers. Organic deposits are largely the result of decomposing plant material.

== Geography and climate ==
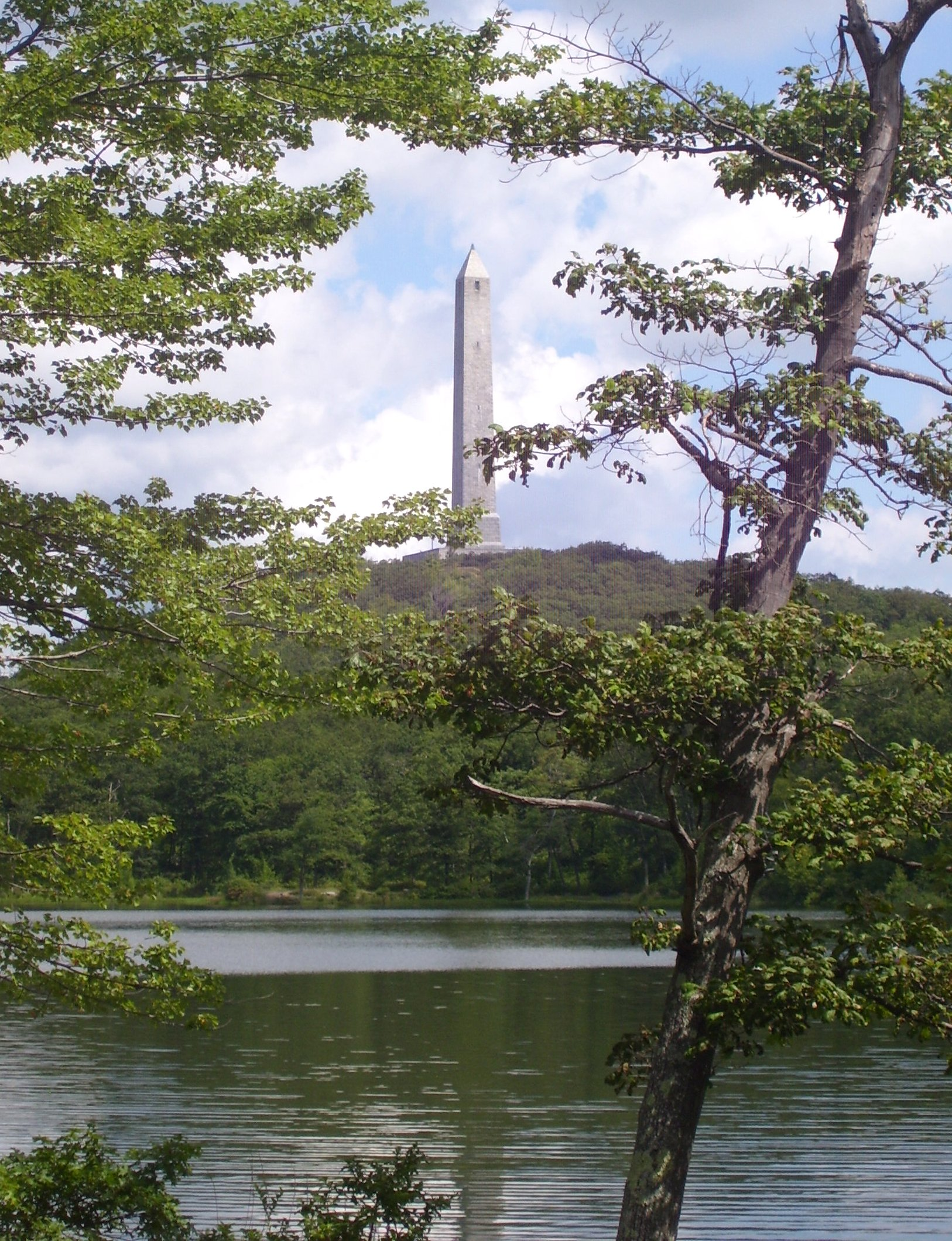
High Point Monument as seen from Lake Marcia in Montague Township, Sussex County. High Point is the highest elevation in New Jersey at 1803 feet above sea level.

According to the U.S. Census Bureau, as of the 2020 Census, the county had a total area of 535.54 square miles (1,387.0 km^{2}), of which 518.66 square miles (1,343.3 km^{2}) was land (96.8%) and 16.88 square miles (43.7 km^{2}) was water (3.2%). It is the fourth-largest of the state's 21 counties in terms of area.

Sussex County lies within the Kittatinny Mountains of Northwestern New Jersey and the overall Appalachian Mountains range. High Point, located at the northernmost tip of New Jersey in Montague Township, is the highest natural elevation in the state at 1,803 feet (550 m) above sea level. Nearby, Sunrise Mountain in Stokes State Forest has an elevation of 1,653 feet (504 m). Many mountains in the Highlands region range from 1,000 to 1,500 feet (300 to 460 m). Officially, the county's lowest elevation is approximately 300 feet (91 m) above sea level along the Delaware River near Flatbrookville. However, local authorities claim unofficially that the mine adit descending 2,675 feet (815 m) at the Sterling Hill Mine in Ogdensburg is the lowest elevation in New Jersey.

Because of its topography, Sussex County has remained a relatively rural and forested area. In the western half of the county, several state and federal parks have kept the large tracts of land undeveloped and in their natural states. The eastern half of the county has had more suburban development because of its proximity to more populated areas and commercial development zones.

With its location at the top of New Jersey, Sussex County is the only county to neighbor both New York and Pennsylvania. Because it is shaped roughly like a diamond or rhombus with its point matching the cardinal points of the compass, its boundary lines are roughly oriented along the ordinal or intercardinal directions.

=== Climate ===
Because of its location in the higher elevations of northwestern New Jersey's Appalachian mountains, Sussex County has a cooler humid continental climate or microthermal climate (Köppen Dfb) which indicates patterns of significant precipitation in all seasons and at least four months where the average temperature rises above 10 °C (50 °F) This differs from the rest of the state which is generally a humid mesothermal climate, in which temperatures range between −3 and 18 °C (27 and 64 °F) during the year's coldest month. Sussex County is part of USDA Plant Hardiness Zone 6.

During winter and early spring, New Jersey in some years is subject to "nor'easters"—significant storm systems that have proven capable of causing blizzards or flooding throughout the northeastern United States. Hurricanes and tropical storms, tornadoes, and earthquakes are relatively rare. The Kittatinny Valley to the north of Newton, part of the Great Appalachian Valley, experiences a snowbelt phenomenon and has been categorized as a microclimate region known as the "Sussex County Snow Belt". This region receives approximately forty to fifty inches of snow per year and generally more snowfall that the rest of Northern New Jersey and the Northern Climate Zone. This phenomenon is attributed to the orographic lift of the Kittatinny Ridge which impacts local weather patterns by increasing humidity and precipitation, providing the ski resorts of Vernon Valley in the northeastern part of this region with increased snowfall.

In recent years, average temperatures in the county seat of Newton have ranged from a low of 17 °F (−8 °C) in January to a high of 84 °F (29 °C) in July. Average monthly precipitation ranged from 2.86 inches (73 mm) in February to 4.76 inches (121 mm) in June.

According to the USDA Natural Resource Conservation Service soil survey, the area receives sunshine approximately 62% of the time in summer and 48% in winter. Prevailing winds are typically from the southwest for most of year; but in late winter and early spring come from the northwest. The lowest recorded temperature was −26 °F on January 21, 1994. The highest recorded temperature was 104 °F (40 °C) on September 3, 1953. The heaviest one-day snowfall was 24 inches (610 mm) recorded on January 8, 1996; combined with the next day, total snowfall was 40 inches (1,000 mm). The heaviest one-day rainfall - 6.70 inches (170 mm) was recorded on August 19, 1955.

Climate data for Sussex, New Jersey (1981–2010 normals) — NOAA-SUSSEX 2 NW (288644)
Month	Jan	Feb	Mar	Apr	May	Jun	Jul	Aug	Sep	Oct	Nov	Dec	Year
Record high °F (°C)	71 (22)	73 (23)	90 (32)	95 (35)	97 (36)	98 (37)	106 (41)	102 (39)	102 (39)	92 (33)	84 (29)	75 (24)	106 (41)
Mean daily maximum °F (°C)	34.1 (1.2)	37.9 (3.3)	46.8 (8.2)	58.9 (14.9)	69.8 (21.0)	77.8 (25.4)	82.3 (27.9)	80.8 (27.1)	73.1 (22.8)	62.2 (16.8)	50.9 (10.5)	38.7 (3.7)	59.4 (15.2)
Mean daily minimum °F (°C)	15.8 (−9.0)	17.9 (−7.8)	25.7 (−3.5)	36.1 (2.3)	45.4 (7.4)	55.1 (12.8)	60.0 (15.6)	58.0 (14.4)	50.1 (10.1)	38.4 (3.6)	31.0 (−0.6)	21.6 (−5.8)	37.9 (3.3)
Record low °F (°C)	−29 (−34)	−23 (−31)	−10 (−23)	9 (−13)	24 (−4)	33 (1)	40 (4)	34 (1)	27 (−3)	13 (−11)	6 (−14)	−13 (−25)	−29 (−34)
Average precipitation inches (mm)	3.19 (81)	2.83 (72)	3.69 (94)	4.27 (108)	4.10 (104)	4.41 (112)	4.02 (102)	4.18 (106)	4.23 (107)	4.52 (115)	3.47 (88)	3.74 (95)	46.65 (1,184)
Average snowfall inches (cm)	13.8 (35)	9.4 (24)	6.5 (17)	2.0 (5.1)	0 (0)	0 (0)	0 (0)	0 (0)	0 (0)	0 (0)	1.3 (3.3)	9.2 (23)	42.2 (107.4)
Average precipitation days (≥ 0.01 in)	10.6	8.6	11.1	12.4	12.6	11.0	10.9	10.7	9.1	10.1	9.9	10.7	127.7
Average snowy days (≥ 0.1 in)	5.4	3.7	2.6	0.5	0	0	0	0	0	0.1	0.6	3.2	16.1
Source: NOAA (extremes 1893–present)

== Demographics ==
Historical population
Census	Pop.	Note	%±
1790	19,500		—
1800	22,534		15.6%
1810	25,549		13.4%
1820	32,752		28.2%
1830	20,346	*	−37.9%
1840	21,770		7.0%
1850	22,989		5.6%
1860	23,846		3.7%
1870	23,168		−2.8%
1880	23,539		1.6%
1890	22,259		−5.4%
1900	24,134		8.4%
1910	26,781		11.0%
1920	24,905		−7.0%
1930	27,830		11.7%
1940	29,632		6.5%
1950	34,423		16.2%
1960	49,255		43.1%
1970	77,528		57.4%
1980	116,119		49.8%
1990	130,943		12.8%
2000	144,166		10.1%
2010	149,265		3.5%
2020	144,221		−3.4%
2025 (est.)	148,063		2.7%
Historical sources: 1790–1990; 1970–2010 2000 2010; 2000–2010 2020 * = Lost territory in previous decade.

=== 2020 census ===
As of the 2020 census, the county had a population of 144,221. The median age was 45.3 years. 19.3% of residents were under the age of 18 and 18.6% of residents were 65 years of age or older. For every 100 females there were 98.3 males, and for every 100 females age 18 and over there were 96.8 males age 18 and over.

The racial makeup of the county was 84.5% White, 2.1% Black or African American, 0.2% American Indian and Alaska Native, 2.1% Asian, <0.1% Native Hawaiian and Pacific Islander, 3.1% from some other race, and 7.9% from two or more races. Hispanic or Latino residents of any race comprised 9.9% of the population.

A total of 51.4% of residents lived in urban areas, while 48.6% lived in rural areas.

There were 55,915 households in the county, of which 28.3% had children under the age of 18 living in them. Of all households, 55.7% were married-couple households, 16.1% were households with a male householder and no spouse or partner present, and 21.7% were households with a female householder and no spouse or partner present. About 23.4% of all households were made up of individuals and 10.5% had someone living alone who was 65 years of age or older.

There were 62,709 housing units, of which 10.8% were vacant. Among occupied housing units, 81.7% were owner-occupied and 18.3% were renter-occupied. The homeowner vacancy rate was 2.2% and the rental vacancy rate was 6.8%.

=== Racial and ethnic composition ===
Sussex County, New Jersey – Racial and ethnic composition Note: the US Census treats Hispanic/Latino as an ethnic category. This table excludes Latinos from the racial categories and assigns them to a separate category. Hispanics/Latinos may be of any race.
Race / Ethnicity (NH = Non-Hispanic)	Pop 1980	Pop 1990	Pop 2000	Pop 2010	Pop 2020	% 1980	% 1990	% 2000	% 2010	% 2020
White alone (NH)	112,907	125,403	134,624	132,484	118,247	97.23%	95.77%	93.38%	88.76%	81.99%
Black or African American alone (NH)	648	1,191	1,444	2,448	2,858	0.56%	0.91%	1.00%	1.64%	1.98%
Native American or Alaska Native alone (NH)	108	191	140	147	191	0.09%	0.15%	0.10%	0.10%	0.13%
Asian alone (NH)	533	1,202	1,723	2,605	2,918	0.46%	0.92%	1.20%	1.75%	2.02%
Native Hawaiian or Pacific Islander alone (NH)	x	x	26	29	11	x	x	0.02%	0.02%	0.01%
Other race alone (NH)	159	45	113	164	666	0.14%	0.03%	0.08%	0.11%	0.46%
Mixed race or Multiracial (NH)	x	x	1,274	1,771	5,020	x	x	0.88%	1.19%	3.48%
Hispanic or Latino (any race)	1,764	2,911	4,822	9,617	14,310	1.52%	2.22%	3.34%	6.44%	9.92%
Total	116,119	130,943	144,166	149,265	144,221	100.00%	100.00%	100.00%	100.00%	100.00%

=== 2010 census ===
The 2010 United States census counted 149,265 people, 54,752 households, and 40,626 families in the county. The population density was 287.6 per square mile (111.0/km^{2}). There were 62,057 housing units at an average density of 119.6 per square mile (46.2/km^{2}). The racial makeup was 93.46% (139,504) White, 1.79% (2,677) Black or African American, 0.16% (234) Native American, 1.77% (2,642) Asian, 0.02% (36) Pacific Islander, 1.19% (1,783) from other races, and 1.60% (2,389) from two or more races. Hispanic or Latino of any race were 6.44% (9,617) of the population.

Of the 54,752 households, 33.5% had children under the age of 18; 61% were married couples living together; 9% had a female householder with no husband present and 25.8% were non-families. Of all households, 21% were made up of individuals and 7.4% had someone living alone who was 65 years of age or older. The average household size was 2.69 and the average family size was 3.14.

24% of the population were under the age of 18, 7.6% from 18 to 24, 23.9% from 25 to 44, 32.6% from 45 to 64, and 12% who were 65 years of age or older. The median age was 41.8 years. For every 100 females, the population had 98.5 males. For every 100 females ages 18 and older there were 96.9 males.

As of 2010, there were a total of 54,881 households enumerated in the 2010 census, with a reported median household income of $84,115, or mean household income of $96,527. Males had a median income of $50,395 versus $33,750 for females. The per capita income for the county was $26,992. About 2.8% of families and 4.0% of the population were below the poverty line, including 4.1% of those under age 18 and 5.4% of those age 65 or over.

Income and benefits in Sussex County, New Jersey, 2010
Household income	Number of households	Percentage of households
Less than $10,000	1,754	3.2%
$10,000 to $14,999	1,136	2.1%
$15,000 to $24,999	2,771	5.0%
$25,000 to $34,999	4,026	7.3%
$35,000 to $49,999	5,872	10.7%
$50,000 to $74,999	9,365	17.1%
$75,000 to $99,999	8,209	15.0%
$100,000 to $149,999	12,927	23.6%
$150,000 to $199,999	4,714	8.6%
$200,000 or more	4,107	7.5%

=== 2000 census ===
As of the 2000 United States census there were 144,166 people, 50,831 households, and 38,784 families residing in the county. The population density was 277 inhabitants per square mile (107/km^{2}). There were 56,528 housing units at an average density of 108 units per square mile (42/km^{2}). The racial makeup of the county was 95.70% White, 1.0% Black or African American, 0.11% Native American, 1.20% Asian, 0.02% Pacific Islander, 0.74% from other races, and 1.14% from two or more races. 3.30% of the population were Hispanic or Latino of any race. Among those residents listing their ancestry, 24.5% were of Italian, 22.9% German, 22.2% Irish, 10.7% English, 8.1% Polish and 5.2% Dutch ancestry according to Census 2000.

In 2000 there were 50,831 households, out of which 39.9% had children under the age of 18 living with them, 65.0% were married couples living together, 8.0% had a female householder with no husband present, and 23.7% were non-families. 18.9% of all households were made up of individuals, and 6.3% had someone living alone who was 65 years of age or older. The average household size was 2.80 and the average family size was 3.24. In the county, the age distribution of the population shows 27.9% under the age of 18, 6.2% from 18 to 24, 31.5% from 25 to 44, 25.3% from 45 to 64, and 9.1% who were 65 years of age or older. The median age was 37 years. For every 100 females, there were 98.0 males. For every 100 females age 18 and over, there were 95.6 males.

As of the 2000 Census, the median household income was $65,266 and the median family income was $73,335. Males had a median income of $44,544 compared with $32,487 for females. The per capita income for the county was $26,992. About 6.30% of families and 8.40% of the population were below the poverty line, including 10.50% of those under age 18 and 8.00% of those age 65 or over.

=== Affluence and poverty ===
Sussex County is considered an affluent area as many of its residents are college-educated, employed in professional or service jobs, and earn above the state's average per capita income and household income statistics. As of 2010, the Bureau of Economic Analysis ranked the county as having the 131st-highest per capita income of all 3,113 counties in the United States (and the ninth-highest in New Jersey). Average per capita income was $49,207 and was 23.2% above the national average.

The median value of all homes in Sussex County as of Q4 2021 was $323,687, up 12.1% from the prior year.

As of the 2006–2010 American Community Survey conducted by the U.S. Census Bureau, 3.6% of county residents were living below the poverty line which the government defined as an annual household income under $22,350 for a family of four. However, recent surveys indicate that in the county's town centers, Sussex Borough (15.1%), Newton (12.8%) and Andover Borough (12.7%), poverty levels reach double-digits. Of these poverty-level residents, an estimated 44% are employed, many of them underemployed despite working multiple jobs.

== Economy ==
The Bureau of Economic Analysis calculated that the county's gross domestic product was $4.6 billion in 2021, which was ranked 20th in the state and was a 3.9% increase from the prior year.

=== Employment and labor force ===
As of the 2010 Census, the county's unemployment rate was 11.0%. The Census Bureau reported a population of 118,420 persons (above age 16) available for the labor force of which 82,449 (69.6%) were actively employed in civilian labor, and 35,971 (30.4%) were not in the labor force.

Occupations in Sussex County, New Jersey, 2010.
Category	Persons employed	Percentage of labor force
Management, business, science, and arts occupations	29,443	40.1%
Service occupations	11,689	15.9%
Sales and office occupations	18,712	25.5%
Natural resources, construction and maintenance occupations	6,715	9.2%
Production, transportation, and material moving occupations	6,784	9.2%
TOTAL	73,343	

Industry in Sussex County, New Jersey, 2010.
Category	Persons employed	Percentage of labor force
Agriculture, forestry, fishing and hunting, and mining	674	0.9%
Construction	5,495	7.5%
Manufacturing	7,922	10.8%
Wholesale trade	2,303	3.1%
Retail trade	8,536	11.6%
Transportation and warehousing, and utilities	3,791	5.2%
Information	2,074	2.8%
Finance and insurance, and real estate and rental and leasing	6,642	9.1%
Professional, scientific, and management, and administrative and waste management services	7,963	10.9%
Educational services, and health care and social assistance	16,268	22.2%
Arts, entertainment, and recreation, and accommodation and food services	6,629	9.0%
Other services, except public administration	2,033	2.8%
Public administration	3,013	4.1%
TOTAL	73,343	

Early industry and commerce chiefly centered on agriculture, milling, and iron mining. As iron deposits were exhausted, mining shifted toward zinc deposits near Franklin and Ogdensburg during the late 19th and early 20th centuries. The local economy expanded due to the introduction of railroads and shortly after the Civil War, the town centers hosted factories. However, the factories, railroads and mining declined by the late 1960s. Today, Sussex County features a mix of rural farmland, forests and suburban development. Because agriculture (chiefly dairy farming) has decreased and that the county hosts little industry, Sussex County is considered a "bedroom community" as most residents commute to neighboring counties (Bergen, Essex and Morris counties) or to New York City for work.

=== Agricultural production ===
Although Sussex County's dairy farming industry has declined significantly in the last 50 years it is still the majority of agricultural production in the region. Trucking has replaced railroads in the transportation of milk products to regional production facilities and markets. Rising taxes, regulation and decreasing profitability in dairy farming have forced farmers to adapt by growing other products or converting their farms to other uses. Many farmers have sold their properties to real estate developers who have built residential housing. Many Sussex County farms are nursery farms producing ornamental trees, plants and flowers used in horticulture, floristry or landscaping. Christmas trees and nursery and greenhouse plants contribute to 51% of the county's annual crop revenues but account for 30% of crop production.

Despite the decline of dairy farming, it is still the largest contributor to the county's annual agricultural revenues. According to the Sussex County Comprehensive Farmland Preservation Plan (2008):

Dairy production has steadily trended downward since 1971, when the county produced 138 million pounds of milk. By 2005 this quantity had fallen to 38.4 million pounds. The decrease is further reflected in the number of dairy farms and milk cows in 1982 as compared to 2002. In 1982 there were 137 dairy farms; by 2002 the number had decreased to only 30. In 1982 there were 6,406 milk cows; in 2002 the quantity had fallen to 1,943.

According to county agricultural statistics, 17.3% of all crop sales ($1.4 million in 2002) were in hay. Nearly 80% of tilled farmland, or 21,195 acres (8,577 ha), on 43% of the farms in the county is dedicated to hay production. Much of hay is grown for feed on livestock farms — especially dairy farms — and never makes it to market and is therefore not included in federal agricultural census data. In 2002, 4,059 acres (1,643 ha) were dedicated to corn cultivation, the majority of it used for feed on the same farms.

According to the 2007 Census of Agriculture compiled by the U.S. Department of Agriculture's National Agricultural Statistics Service, Sussex County has 1,060 farms totaling 65,242 acres (26,403 ha; 101.941 sq mi) out of New Jersey's total 10,327 farms managing 773,450 acres (313,000 ha; 1,208.52 sq mi). This is up from 1,029 farms in the 2002 Census estimate. However, acreage dedicated to agriculture declined by 13.6% from 75,496 acres (30,552 ha; 117.963 sq mi) in 2002. Note though that 102,547 acres—roughly 30% of the county's land area—are under farmland assessment for the purpose of calculating property tax levies. This decrease is total acreage is due, in large part, to "suburban sprawl" as farmers capitalized by converting to commercial and residential development. The average size of a farm in 2007 was 62 acres (25 ha) acres, down from 73 acres (30 ha). The 2007 acreage dedicated to agriculture is roughly 19.6% of the county's land area. The county-wide total agricultural product sales in 2007 was $21,242,000, up from $14,756,000 in 2002. Total county market value of land and buildings in 2007 was $888,955,000, an increase from $520,997,000 in 2002. The average market value per farm was $838,636 (2007), up from $505,823 (2002). This results in a per acre price of $13,625 (2007), up from $7,136 (2002).

With the repeal of several prohibition-era alcohol laws in 1981, 43 wineries have become licensed and are operating in the state. New Jersey wines have grown in stature due to increased marketing and quality, recent successes and awards in competitions, and appreciation by critics. Sussex County is home to three established and operating wineries and three more are in development.

=== Industry and manufacturing ===
Sussex County's industrial and manufacturing base is no longer towards heavy industry and mining. Today, companies like Thorlabs, are located here.

== Municipalities ==
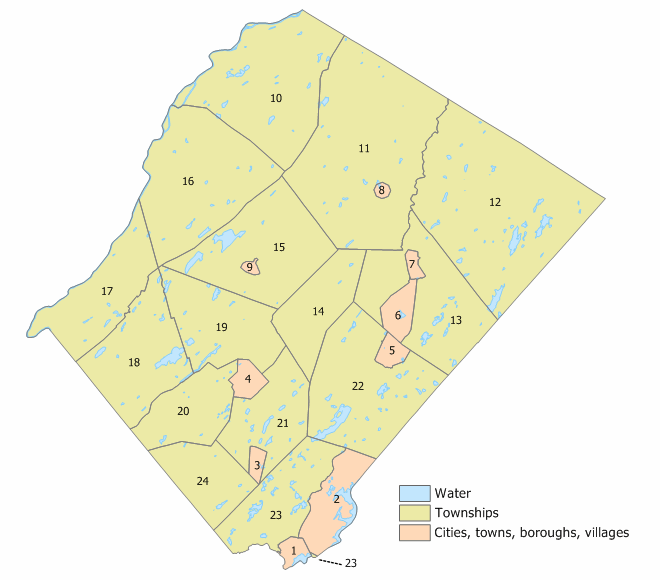
Index map of Sussex County municipalities (click to see index key)

Interactive map of municipalities in Sussex County.

The 24 municipalities in Sussex County (with 2010 Census data for population, housing units and area) are:

Municipality	Map key	Municipal type	Population	Housing units	Total area	Water area	Land area	Pop. density	Housing density	School district	Communities
Andover Borough	3	borough	595	263	1.47	0.02	1.45	417.3	181.1	Newton (9–12) (S/R); Andover (PK-8)	
Andover Township	21	township	5,996	2,181	20.69	0.73	19.96	316.6	109.3	Newton (9–12) (S/R); Andover (PK-8)	Brighton; Pinkneyville; Springdale; Whitehall
Branchville	9	borough	791	386	0.60	0.01	0.59	1,419.2	651.4	High Point (9–12); Frankford Township (PK-8) (S/R)	
Byram Township	23	township	8,028	3,207	22.26	1.19	21.07	396.2	152.2	Lenape Valley (9–12); Byram Township (PK-8)	Byram Center CDP (2,232); Lake Mohawk CDP (part; 1,824)
Frankford	15	township	5,302	2,520	35.44	1.42	34.02	163.6	74.1	High Point (9–12); Frankford Township (PK-8)	Ross Corner CDP (120)
Franklin	6	borough	4,912	2,136	4.57	0.07	4.50	1,121.6	474.9	Wallkill Valley (9–12); Franklin Borough (K-8)	
Fredon Township	20	township	3,235	1,289	18.00	0.28	17.72	194.0	72.7	Kittatinny (7–12); Fredon Township (PK-6)	
Green Township	24	township	3,627	1,251	16.26	0.27	15.98	225.3	78.3	Newton (9–12) (S/R); Green Township (K-8)	
Hamburg	7	borough	3,266	1,476	1.16	0.02	1.14	2,870.4	1,292.9	Wallkill Valley (9–12); Hamburg (K-8)	
Hampton Township	19	township	4,893	2,200	25.30	0.92	24.38	213.2	90.3	Kittatinny (7–12); Hampton Township (PK-6)	Crandon Lakes CDP (part; 682)
Hardyston	13	township	8,125	3,783	32.64	0.67	31.97	256.9	118.3	Wallkill Valley (9–12); Hardyston Township (PK-8)	
Hopatcong	2	borough	14,362	6,296	12.25	1.39	10.85	1,395.5	580.0	Hopatcong	
Lafayette Township	14	township	2,358	919	18.05	0.09	17.96	141.3	51.2	High Point (9–12); Lafayette Township (PK-8)	
Montague	10	township	3,792	1,802	45.38	1.38	44.00	87.4	41.0	High Point (9–12); Montague Township (PK-8)	
Newton	4	town	8,374	3,479	3.17	0.02	3.15	2,542.2	1,106.0	Newton	
Ogdensburg	5	borough	2,258	905	2.33	0.05	2.28	1,055.4	396.3	Wallkill Valley (9–12); Ogdensburg Borough (PK-8)	
Sandyston	16	township	1,977	988	43.26	0.74	42.52	47.0	23.2	Kittatiny (7–12); Sandyston-Walpack (K-6)	Layton CDP (692)
Sparta	22	township	19,600	7,423	38.97	2.02	36.94	533.9	200.9	Sparta Township	Lake Mohawk CDP (part; 8,092)
Stanhope	1	borough	3,526	1,472	2.19	0.35	1.84	1,966.3	801.8	Lenape Valley (9–12); Stanhope (K-8)	
Stillwater Township	18	township	4,004	1,930	28.38	1.32	27.06	151.5	71.3	Kittatiny (7–12); Stillwater Township (PK-6)	Crandon Lakes CDP (part; 496)
Sussex	8	borough	2,024	1,005	0.62	0.03	0.59	3,615.9	1,706.1	High Point (9–12); Sussex-Wantage (K-8)	
Vernon Township	12	township	22,358	10,958	70.59	2.35	68.23	350.9	160.6	Vernon Township	Glenwood (2,751); Highland Lakes CDP (4,816); McAfee (127); Upper Greenwood Lake CDP (part; 3,786); Vernon Center CDP (1,713); Vernon Valley CDP (1,491)
Walpack Township	17	township	7	15	24.70	0.65	24.05	0.7	0.6	Kittatiny (7–12); Sandyston-Walpack (K-6)	
Wantage	11	township	10,811	4,173	67.48	0.73	66.75	170.1	62.5	High Point (9–12); Sussex-Wantage (K-8)	Quarryville
Sussex County		county	144,221	62,057	535.74	16.73	519.01	287.6	119.6		

== Government ==
=== County government ===
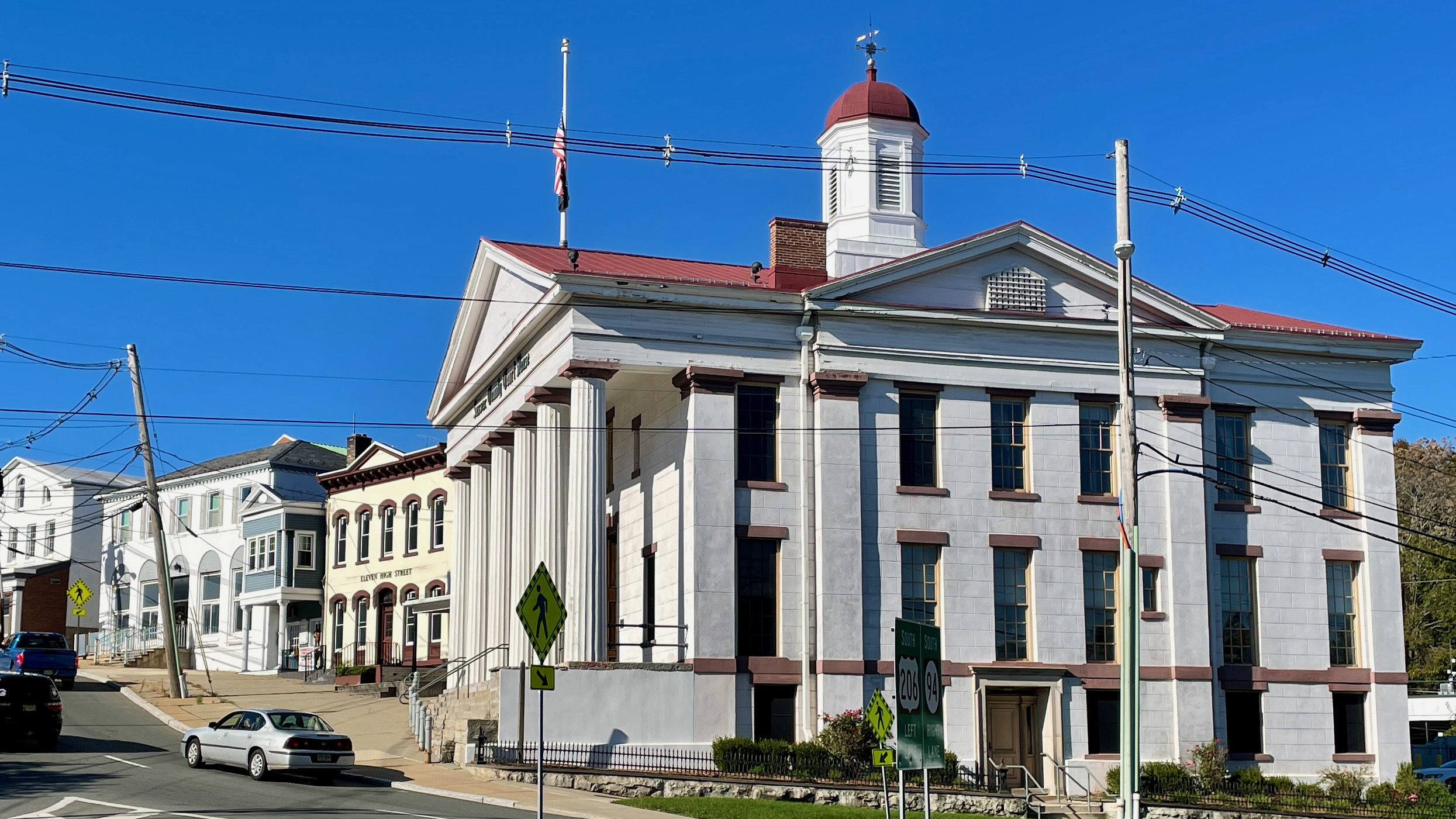
Historic Sussex County Courthouse in Newton

Sussex County is governed by the Sussex County Board of County Commissioners whose five members are elected at-large in partisan elections on a staggered basis, with either one or two seats coming up for election each year. At an annual reorganization meeting held in the beginning of January, the board selects a commissioner director and deputy director from among its members, with day-to-day supervision of the operation of the county delegated to a county administrator. As of 2025, Sussex County's Commissioners are (with terms for director and deputy director ending every December 31), Director Chris Carney (R, Frankford Township, term as commissioner ends 2027; term as director ends 2025), Deputy Director Jill Space (R, Wantage Township, term as commissioner and as deputy director end 2025), Jack DeGroot (R, Sussex, 2026), William Hayden (I, Frankford Township, 2025) and Alan Henderson (R, Lafayette Township, 2027).

The commissioners appoint a County Administrator to oversee the day-to-day management of the county. The Administrator is Ron Tappan, whose three-year appointment expires December 31, 2025. Many services overseen by the county government overlap with those provided at the municipal level. The County government oversees and administers the following areas of responsibility:

- Public Safety and Emergency Management
- Sussex County Community College
- Sussex County Technical School
- The County Library System
- Social Services
- Youth Services
- Community Service
- Public Mental Health
- Division of Senior Services
- Environmental and Public Health Services
- Mosquito Control
- The Medical Examiner's Office
- The County Jail and Juvenile Detention Center
- Farmland and Open Space Preservation
- Economic Development
- The Maintenance and repair of County Roads and Bridges
- The Para Transit System and Transportation Planning
- Solid Waste Planning (The county dump in Lafayette Township)
- The County Master Plan (including Water Resource Planning)

Before 1911, two commissioners from each township were elected annually to serve on the board. However, as this became unwieldy in the late 19th century during the era of Boroughitis and the creation of hundreds of new municipalities, the State Legislature chose to reorganize the size of county freeholder boards to an odd number between three and nine members. The size of the board was a reflection of the county's population. As Sussex County was rural and among the least populated counties in the state, for the next 80 years, Sussex County's Board of Chosen Freeholders consisted of three elected members. The board increased from three to five members as of January 1, 1990, based on the results of a referendum. No Democrat has been elected to countywide office since 1999. In May 2022, Jill Space was appointed to fill the seat expiring in December 2022 that had been held by Sylvia Petillo until she resigned from office.

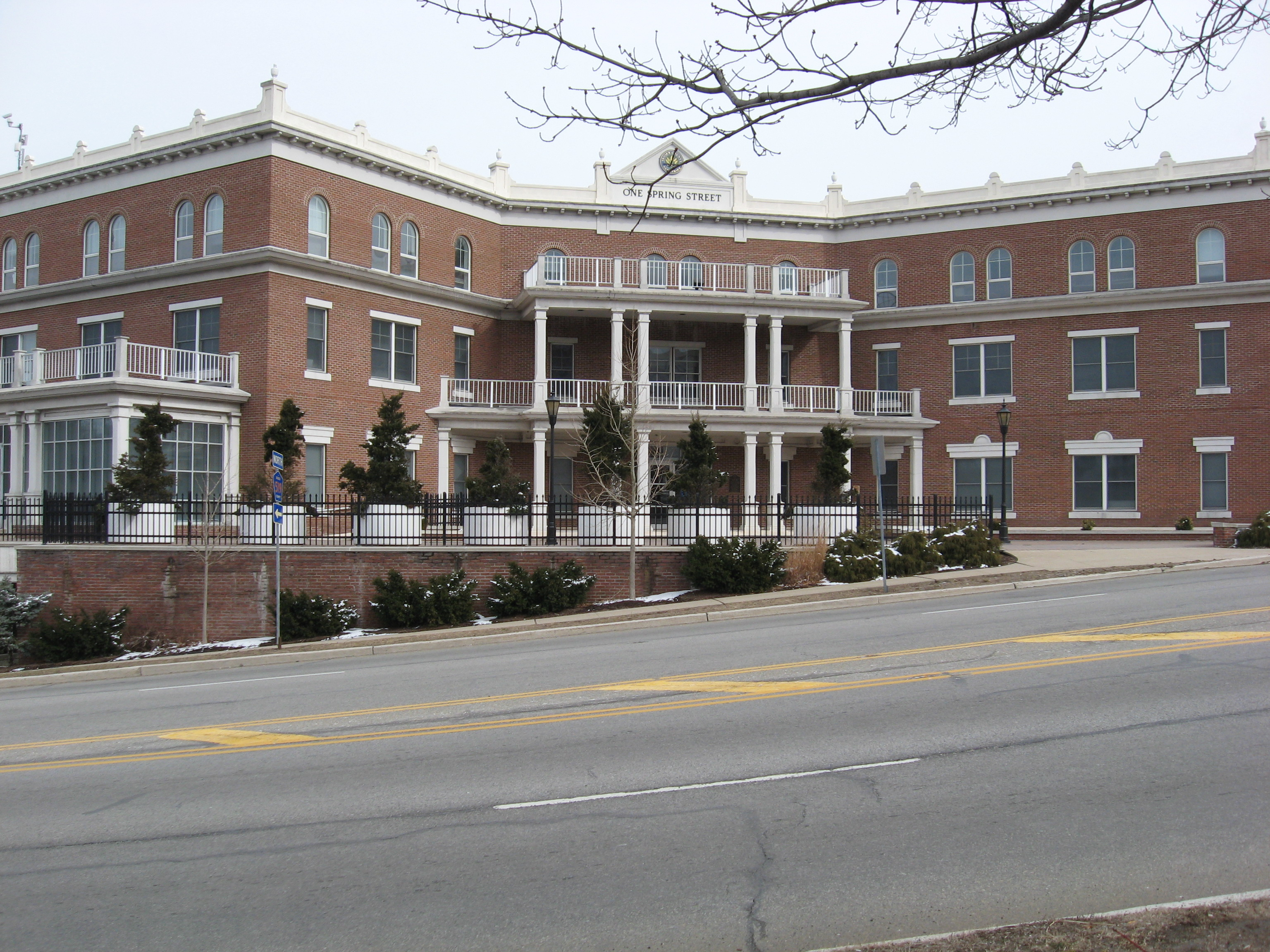
Sussex County's administrative offices are located in downtown Newton, New Jersey across the street from the historic county courthouse.

Pursuant to Article VII Section II of the New Jersey State Constitution, each county in New Jersey is required to have three elected administrative officials known as "constitutional officers". These officers are the County Clerk and County Surrogate (both elected for five-year terms of office) and the County Sheriff (elected for a three-year term). Sussex County's constitutional officers are:

Title	Representative
County Clerk	Jeffrey M. Parrott (R, Wantage Township, 2026)
Sheriff	Michael F. Strada (R, Hampton Township, 2025).
Surrogate	Gary R. Chiusano (R, Frankford Township, 2028).

The Sussex County Prosecutor is Francis A. Koch of Hardyston Township, who was nominated to the position by Governor of New Jersey Chris Christie in June 2014. Sussex County is a part of Vicinage 10 of the New Jersey Superior Court (along with Morris County), which is seated at the Morris County Courthouse in Morristown; the Assignment Judge for Vicinage 10 is Stuart A. Minkowitz. Cases venued in Sussex County are heard at the Sussex County Judicial Center in Newton.

=== Federal representatives ===
Two congressional districts cover Sussex County, with the northern part of the county in the 5th congressional district and the southern part in the 7th congressional district. For the 119th United States Congress, New Jersey's 5th congressional district is represented by Josh Gottheimer (D, Wyckoff). For the 119th United States Congress, New Jersey's 7th congressional district is represented by Thomas Kean Jr. (R, Westfield).

=== State represenatatives ===
All of Sussex County is located in one legislative district.

District	Senator	Assembly	Notes
24th	Parker Space (R)	Dawn Fantasia (R) Mike Inganamort (R)	The remainder of this district includes portions of Morris County and Warren County.

== Politics ==
United States presidential election results for Sussex County, New Jersey
Year	Republican		Democratic		Third party(ies)	
Year	No.	%	No.	%	No.	%
1896	3,045	49.09%	2,975	47.96%	183	2.95%
1900	2,876	44.37%	3,395	52.38%	211	3.26%
1904	2,642	43.55%	3,133	51.65%	291	4.80%
1908	2,653	44.25%	3,214	53.61%	128	2.14%
1912	890	16.57%	2,852	53.10%	1,629	30.33%
1916	2,461	43.38%	3,093	54.52%	119	2.10%
1920	5,224	58.75%	3,516	39.54%	152	1.71%
1924	6,319	61.36%	3,632	35.27%	347	3.37%
1928	8,964	74.50%	3,043	25.29%	25	0.21%
1932	7,130	53.18%	6,136	45.76%	142	1.06%
1936	7,945	53.46%	6,862	46.17%	54	0.36%
1940	8,642	57.67%	6,314	42.14%	28	0.19%
1944	8,817	62.68%	5,237	37.23%	12	0.09%
1948	9,269	66.50%	4,527	32.48%	143	1.03%
1952	13,415	74.68%	4,534	25.24%	14	0.08%
1956	15,867	80.67%	3,756	19.10%	46	0.23%
1960	16,362	69.21%	7,269	30.75%	11	0.05%
1964	11,836	45.18%	14,349	54.77%	12	0.05%
1968	18,043	61.71%	8,325	28.47%	2,872	9.82%
1972	25,977	74.44%	8,585	24.60%	336	0.96%
1976	23,613	60.19%	14,759	37.62%	857	2.18%
1980	27,063	63.94%	10,531	24.88%	4,733	11.18%
1984	35,680	75.36%	11,502	24.29%	163	0.34%
1988	36,086	71.94%	13,676	27.26%	398	0.79%
1992	29,510	51.71%	14,775	25.89%	12,779	22.39%
1996	26,746	49.36%	19,525	36.04%	7,912	14.60%
2000	33,277	57.88%	21,353	37.14%	2,860	4.97%
2004	44,506	64.08%	23,990	34.54%	962	1.39%
2008	44,184	59.37%	28,840	38.75%	1,393	1.87%
2012	40,625	59.57%	26,104	38.28%	1,465	2.15%
2016	46,658	62.08%	24,212	32.21%	4,288	5.71%
2020	51,701	58.78%	34,481	39.20%	1,781	2.02%
2024	52,123	61.59%	31,019	36.65%	1,487	1.76%

Sussex County has been a stronghold for the Republican Party, with voters in each of its municipalities consistently voting for the Republican presidential candidate since 2004. In terms of party registration, Sussex County is the second-most Republican county in New Jersey, behind only Ocean County. Among registered voters, affiliations with the Republican Party outpace those of the Democratic Party by a ratio of about five to two. All five members of the board of county commissioners, all three county-wide constitutional officers, and all three state legislators are Republicans. The Republican presidential candidate has carried the county in all but one election since 1920. The lone exception is 1964, when Lyndon B. Johnson won 44 states and carried every county in New Jersey. Republican Donald Trump carried the county in 2020, though it was the best Democratic performance since 1964.

As of October 1, 2021, there were a total of 117,681 registered voters in Sussex County, of whom 49,184 (41.8%) were registered as Republicans, 26,800 (22.8%) were registered as Democrats and 39,878 (33.9%) were registered as unaffiliated. There were 1,819 voters (1.5%) registered to other parties. Among the county's 2010 Census population, 65.8% were registered to vote, including 86.5% of those ages 18 and over.

Senate Class 1 election results

United States Senate election results for Sussex County, New Jersey1
Year	Republican		Democratic		Third party(ies)	
Year	No.	%	No.	%	No.	%
2024	49,734	60.46%	29,959	36.42%	2,571	3.13%
2018	37,720	61.96%	20,229	33.23%	2,926	4.81%
2012	38,250	57.70%	25,212	38.03%	2,831	4.27%
2006	26,185	61.19%	14,839	34.68%	1,769	4.13%
2000	35,740	62.83%	18,453	32.44%	2,694	4.74%
1994	24,024	65.73%	11,332	31.00%	1,195	3.27%
1988	29,909	60.35%	19,035	38.41%	613	1.24%
1982	19,498	62.02%	11,506	36.60%	435	1.38%

Senate Class 2 election results

United States Senate election results for Sussex County, New Jersey2
Year	Republican		Democratic		Third party(ies)	
Year	No.	%	No.	%	No.	%
2020	49,885	57.78%	33,919	39.29%	2,525	2.92%
2014	22,292	61.82%	12,722	35.28%	1,046	2.90%
2013	17,796	64.93%	9,252	33.75%	362	1.32%
2008	41,660	57.89%	27,178	37.77%	3,124	4.34%
2002	25,099	63.04%	13,673	34.34%	1,045	2.62%
1996	30,865	58.39%	18,152	34.34%	3,843	7.27%
1990	19,789	59.37%	12,814	38.45%	726	2.18%
1984	21,494	45.64%	25,334	53.80%	264	0.56%

=== State elections ===
Governor election results

Gubernatorial election results for Sussex County, New Jersey
Year	Republican		Democratic		Third party(ies)	
Year	No.	%	No.	%	No.	%
2025	38,118	58.77%	26,308	40.56%	429	0.66%
2021	36,310	66.85%	17,346	31.93%	663	1.22%
2017	25,401	59.70%	15,431	36.27%	1,717	4.04%
2013	29,873	71.13%	10,704	25.49%	1,419	3.38%
2009	31,749	63.69%	12,870	25.82%	5,227	10.49%
2005	25,283	59.74%	14,854	35.10%	2,182	5.16%
2001	23,478	60.08%	14,641	37.47%	957	2.45%
1997	25,458	60.44%	11,331	26.90%	5,332	12.66%
1993	28,614	66.48%	13,052	30.33%	1,373	3.19%
1989	20,096	56.00%	14,901	41.52%	890	2.48%
1985	22,109	77.70%	5,998	21.08%	346	1.22%
1981	21,923	69.34%	9,111	28.82%	581	1.84%
1977	14,575	50.29%	13,431	46.34%	975	3.36%
1973	9,502	37.17%	15,866	62.07%	195	0.76%
1969	16,275	65.68%	7,800	31.48%	704	2.84%
1965	13,002	58.31%	9,162	41.09%	135	0.61%
1961	11,611	60.07%	7,674	39.70%	44	0.23%
1957	9,440	53.93%	8,057	46.03%	8	0.05%
1953	7,566	52.33%	6,727	46.53%	165	1.14%

== Law enforcement ==
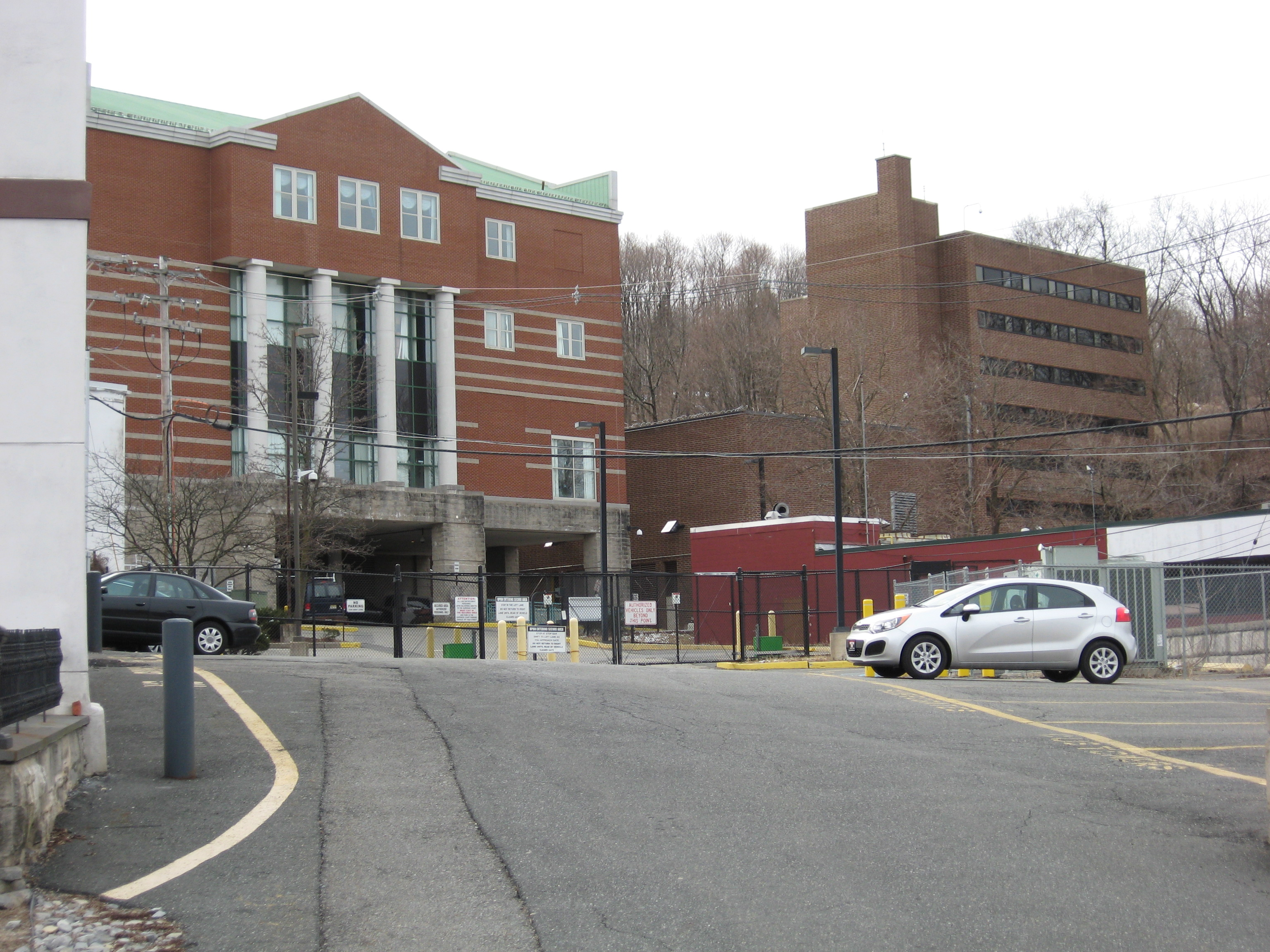
The current Sussex County Courthouse (left), built in the 1990s, and the Keogh-Dwyer Correctional Facility (right), the county jail.

Municipalities that do not have their own police departments have services provided by the New Jersey State Police. One of the primary responsibilities of the New Jersey State Police is to provide police services to these rural towns, for which the municipality is assessed an annual fee paid to the state government Troop B of the New Jersey State Police operates a Sussex station located on Route 206 in Augusta. Fewer than half of the county's municipalities have a local police department. Police Departments are located in the municipalities of Vernon, Hardyston, Sparta, Byram, Hopatcong, Stanhope, Andover, Newton, Ogdensburg, Franklin, and Hamburg. The other 13 municipalities are rural and rely on State Police coverage. Stillwater Township disbanded its police department in December 2009, estimating a savings of $482,000 by having State Police coverage.

The New Jersey State Park Police has jurisdiction throughout the state, but patrol primarily in Stokes State Forest and other local state parks.

Sussex County Sheriff's Office
- Abbreviation: SCSO

Agency overview
- Formed: 1753

Jurisdictional structure
- Operations jurisdiction: United States
- Legal jurisdiction: Sussex County, New Jersey

Operational structure
- Headquarters: 39 High Street; Newton, New Jersey
- County Sheriff responsible: Michael F. Strada (since 2011)

Website
- Official website

The duties of the Sussex County Sheriff's Office include overseeing security at the county's courthouse facilities, operating the county jail, and civil processes. The current sheriff is Michael F. Strada, a former officer with the Mount Olive Township police department.

=== Crime ===
Crime is relatively low in Sussex County.

In the 2012 New Jersey Uniform Crime Report, Sussex County reported the following arrests:

- Murder: 1
- Rape: 1
- Robbery: 16
- Aggravated Assault: 50
- Burglary: 115
- Larceny – Theft: 348
- Motor Vehicle Theft: 5
- Total: 536

The above arrest data includes both minor and adult arrests.

== Media ==
=== Newspapers ===
Sussex County has one daily newspaper, the New Jersey Herald, which is published six days each week (Sunday through Friday). Established in 1829 by Grant Fitch, the Herald is one of the oldest continuing newspapers in the state with distribution throughout Sussex County and into neighboring Morris and Warren counties in New Jersey, Orange County, New York and Pike County, Pennsylvania. Its headquarters, and production facilities are located in Newton, New Jersey. Its printing facilities were located in Newton, as well, but in 2012 the newspaper's printing was outsourced to North Jersey Media Group, located in Rockaway, New Jersey.

It was for most of its existence published once per week. Its Sunday edition, the New Jersey Sunday Herald, was first published on June 11, 1962, and for the next few years it was published twice weekly. In 1969, after a sale to American Newspapers, Inc., a daily edition was planned which began publication on March 16, 1970. American Newspapers, Inc. sold it to Quincy Newspapers in March 1980. Quincy later sold the newspaper to GateHouse Media in May 2019, and later that year, acquired Gannett and assumed its name in a merger. Today, its content includes coverage of local news and sporting events (chiefly those in Sussex County) and printing selected articles from the Associated Press covering state, national and international events.

=== Television ===
Sussex County is served by Optimum, a division of Optimum Communications, in Sparta, New Jersey. Optimum has offered channels for local access programming (channel 10) and for "community bulletin boards". It offers two free Public Service Announcements or event advertisements for free to non-profit organizations in Sussex and Warren Counties.

WMBC-TV an independent television station owned by Mountain Broadcasting Corporation, is licensed to operate in Newton. It is recognized for providing Korean language programming in the New York metropolitan area but also offers English-language programs. Its studios are located in West Caldwell, New Jersey and its transmitter near Lake Hopatcong. Before 2009, it operated an analog transmission on virtual channel 63 (UHF-63) but has converted to broadcasting its signal on digital channel 18.

The New Jersey Public Broadcasting Authority maintains the license to operate a low-power translator (W36AZ) in Sussex Borough to broadcast the state's public television station, NJTV. This station, which used to be the New Jersey Network (NJN), is operated by WNET.org, the parent company of New York City's flagship public television stations, WNET and WLIW, through a subsidiary nonprofit organization, Public Media NJ.

=== Radio ===
Sussex County is served largely by radio stations in the New York City metropolitan area. Stations from Lehigh Valley in Pennsylvania; Hudson Valley in New York; can also be heard including CHR's Z100 100.3 FM (Eastern Sussex), B104 104.1 FM (Western Sussex), K104 104.7 FM (Northern Sussex), and 98.5 KRZ 107.9 FM (Southwestern Sussex) and iHeartMedia owns a cluster of three stations in the county, including: 102.3 FM WSUS in Franklin (Format: Adult contemporary), 103.7 FM WNNJ in Newton (Format: Classic rock), and 106.3 FM WHCY in Franklin (Format: Country). Centro Biblico of NJ also owns a Spanish language Christian station, 1360 AM WTOC in Newton.

Stations nearby include 91.9 FM WXPJ broadcast from Centenary College in Hackettstown (Warren County) with a public radio and progressive music format and 1110 AM WTBQ in Warwick, New York with a NewsTalk and Sports format.

New Jersey Public Radio (NJN), affiliated with National Public Radio and American Public Media, operates two stations in the region: 88.5 FM WNJP in Sussex, and 89.3 FM WNJY in Netcong.

== Transportation ==
=== Roads and highways ===
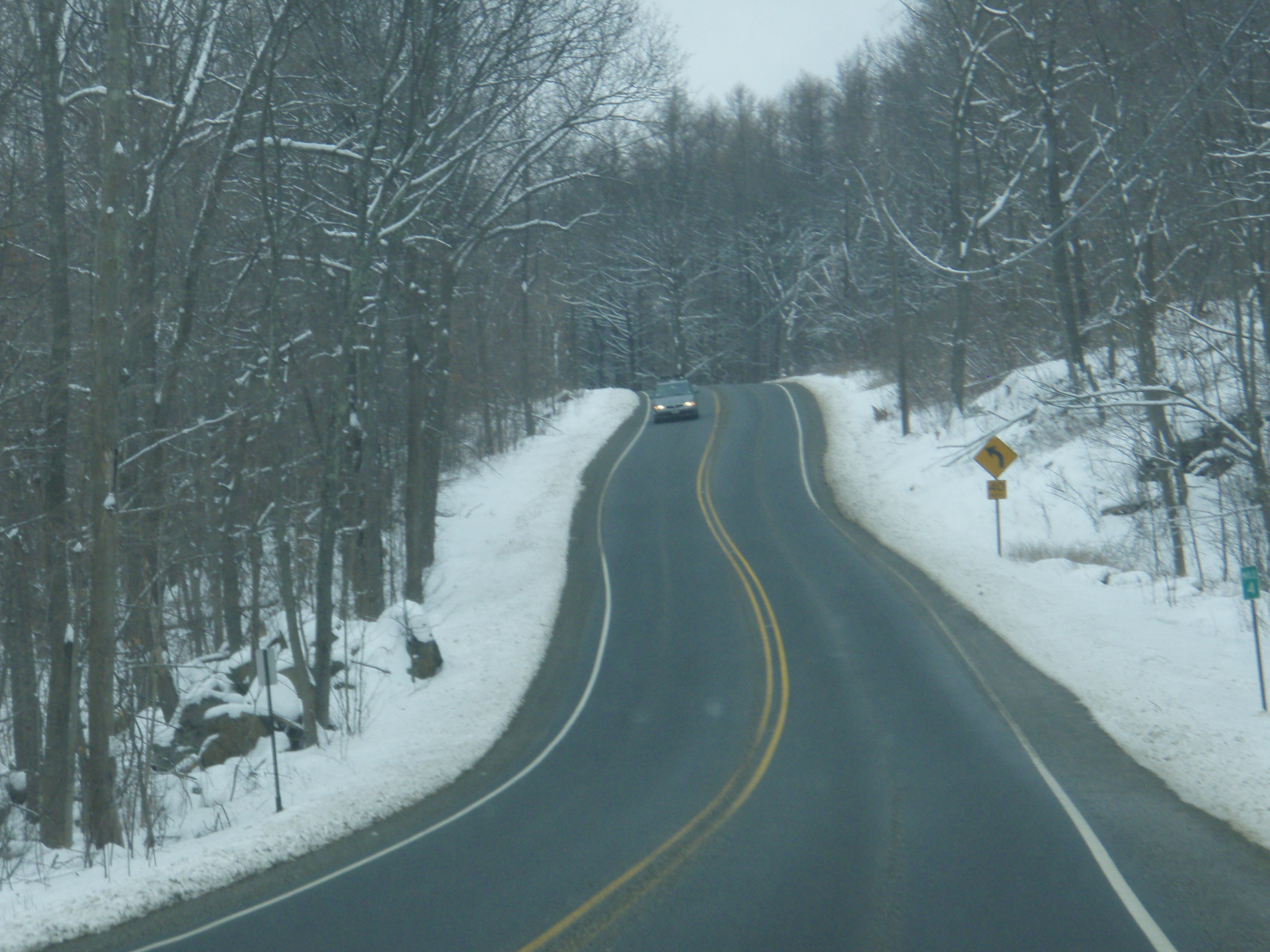
County Route 515 connects New Jersey State Route 23 and Route 94 in Hardyston and Vernon townships.

Sussex County is served by a number of roads connecting it to the rest of the state and to both Pennsylvania and New York. According to the county government, "a vast majority of residents who use single occupant vehicles to travel outside the county for employment. Thus, the demand for public transportation in the county is minimal." Interstate 80 passes through the extreme southern tip of Sussex County solely in Byram. Interstate 84 passes just yards north of Sussex County, but never enters New Jersey. New Jersey's Route 15, Route 23, Route 94, Route 181, Route 183, and Route 284 pass through the county, as does U.S. Route 206.

As of 2010, the county had a total of 1,313.67 miles (2,114.15 km) of roadways, of which 888.54 miles (1,429.97 km) were maintained by the local municipality, 313.29 miles (504.19 km) by Sussex County and 111.35 miles (179.20 km) by the New Jersey Department of Transportation and 0.49 miles (0.79 km) by the Delaware River Joint Toll Bridge Commission.

==== Bridges ====
Sussex County has two toll-bridge crossings over the Delaware River.

Operated by the Delaware River Joint Toll Bridge Commission, the Milford-Montague Toll Bridge (also known as the US 206 Toll Bridge) carries U.S. Route 206 over the Delaware connecting Montague Township and Milford, Pennsylvania. The current bridge was opened in 1954, replacing a series of bridges located here beginning in 1826. Route 206 merges with U.S. Route 209 a mile south of the village center. Tolls are collected only from motorists traveling westbound, into Pennsylvania, with cars paying a $1 toll; a total of $1.7 million was generated from 1.3 million vehicles in 2016.

The Dingman's Ferry Bridge is the last privately owned toll bridge on the Delaware River and one of the last few in the United States. It is owned and operated by the Dingmans Choice and Delaware Bridge Company which has operated bridges at the site since 1836. The bridge connects the village of Dingmans in Delaware Township in Pike County, Pennsylvania and State Route 2019 with County Route 560 and the Old Mine Road in Sandyston Township.

=== Commuter rail service ===
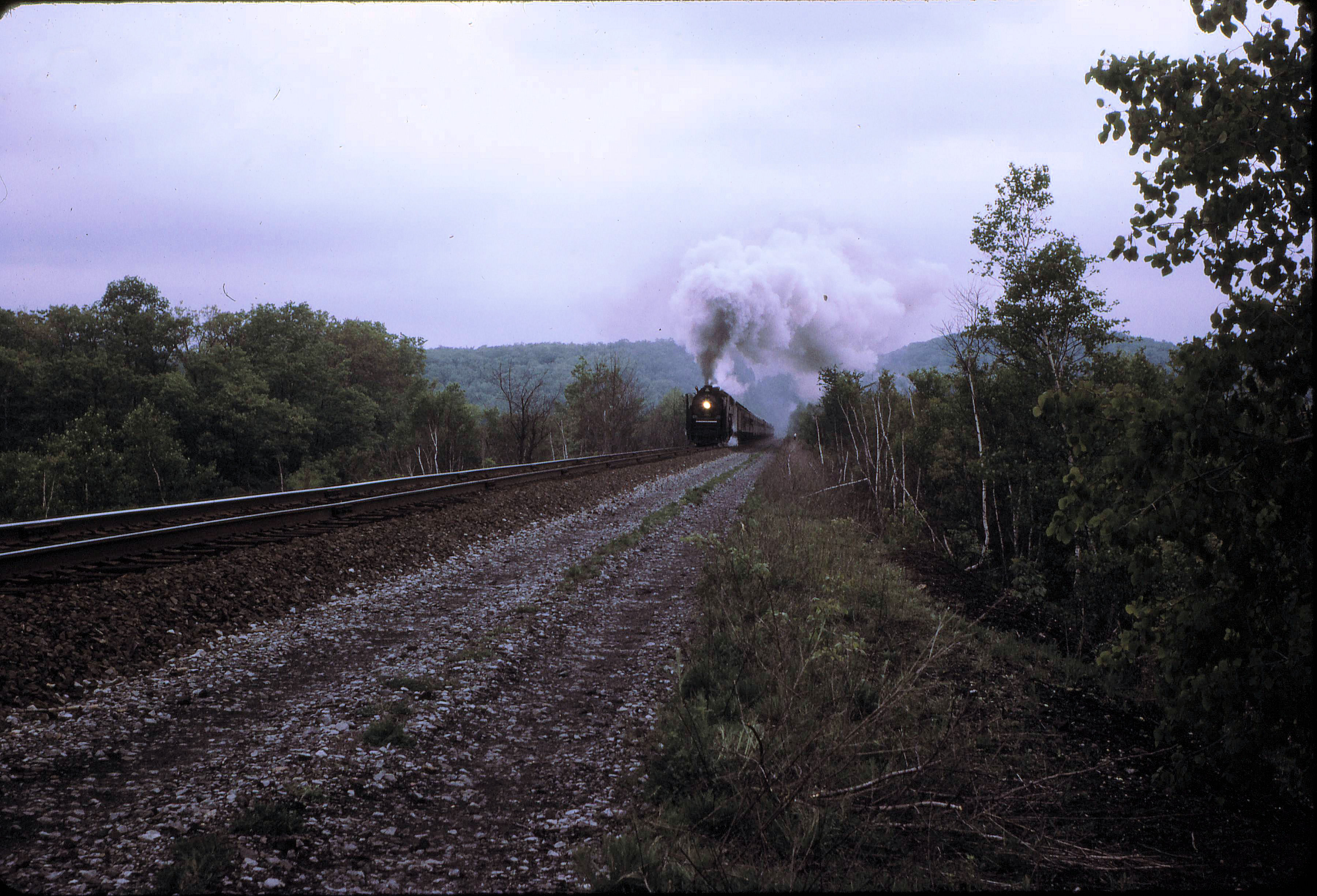
Former Reading Company 4-8-4 steam locomotive #2102 travels eastward to Hoboken after exiting the Roseville Tunnel in Byram Township (from June 1973). Closed in the 1970s, this section is scheduled to be reopened by NJ Transit in 2026 for commuter service.

As of 2012, Sussex County's sole operating railroad line is dedicated to freight service in Sparta, Vernon and Hardyston townships. It is operated by the New York, Susquehanna & Western railroad and CSX Transportation. Commuter rail service has not been offered in the county since the 1960s. However, commuter rail service is available from nearby stations along NJ Transit's Morris and Essex Lines in Hackettstown, Mount Olive, Netcong, Lake Hopatcong, Mount Arlington and Dover, which are accessible to Sussex County residents by car or through bus services contracted by NJ Transit. This line was part of the former Delaware, Lackawanna and Western Railroad system. Service is available directly to Hoboken Terminal or via the Kearny Connection (opened in 1996) to Secaucus Junction and New York Penn Station in Midtown Manhattan. Passengers can transfer at Newark Broad Street station or Summit to reach either New York or Hoboken.

NJ Transit is planning to re-open commuter service through the Lackawanna Cut-Off Restoration Project will allow train transport through Andover and Green Townships in the southern part of the county. Service from a planned station in Andover into New York City and Hoboken is scheduled to begin in 2026, marking the first time Sussex County has seen passenger trains since 1970. The portion of the Cut-Off route west of Andover heading toward Scranton, Pennsylvania has not been funded or scheduled, however Amtrak has announced plans for its restoration.

=== Bus service ===
NJ Transit in partnership with the county government offers bus service in Sussex County, limited to Monday-Saturday service on the "Skylands Connect" route between the Sussex-Wantage Library and Hampton Plaza in Newton, NJ. The county government's Office of Transit also operates a ParaTransit bus service on weekdays to local senior citizens, veterans, people with disabilities, and the general public. It offers service within the county for local errands (nutrition, medical appointments, shopping, hairdresser appointments, banking, community services, education/training, and employment) and outside the county for non-emergency medical appointments (dialysis, therapy, radiation treatment, mental health, specialized hospitals, and Veterans facilities). NJ Transit also offers weekday service between New York City's Midtown Port Authority Bus Terminal and Stockholm, and seasonal service to Vernon.

Lakeland Bus Lines, a privately operated commuter bus company based in Dover, in Morris County offers service under contract with NJ Transit between Newton and Sparta to New York City's Midtown Port Authority Bus Terminal.

=== Airports ===
There are four general aviation public-use airports in Sussex County that cater to recreational pilots. They include:

- Aeroflex-Andover Airport (FAA LID 12N) also in Andover Township. This airport is located in Kittatinny Valley State Park and is owned and operated by the New Jersey Forest Fire Service. It has one 1,981 feet (604 m) runway designated 3/21 and is located at and elevation of 583 feet (178 m) above mean sea level.
- Newton Airport (FAA LID 3N5) located in Andover Township and is privately owned. It has one 2,546 feet (776 m) runway with a 6/24 designation and is located at an elevation of 620 feet (190 m) above mean sea level. The Airport closed in 2013.
- Sussex Airport (FAA LID FWN) located in Wantage Township and is privately owned. It has a 3,499 feet (1,066 m) runway with a 3/21 designation and is located at an elevation of 421 feet (128 m) above mean sea level.
- Trinca Airport (FAA LID 13N) located in and owned by Green Township, which has a 1,924-foot (586 m) grass runway with a 6/24 designation and located at an elevation of 600 feet (180 m) above mean sea level.

== Education ==
=== Primary and secondary schools ===
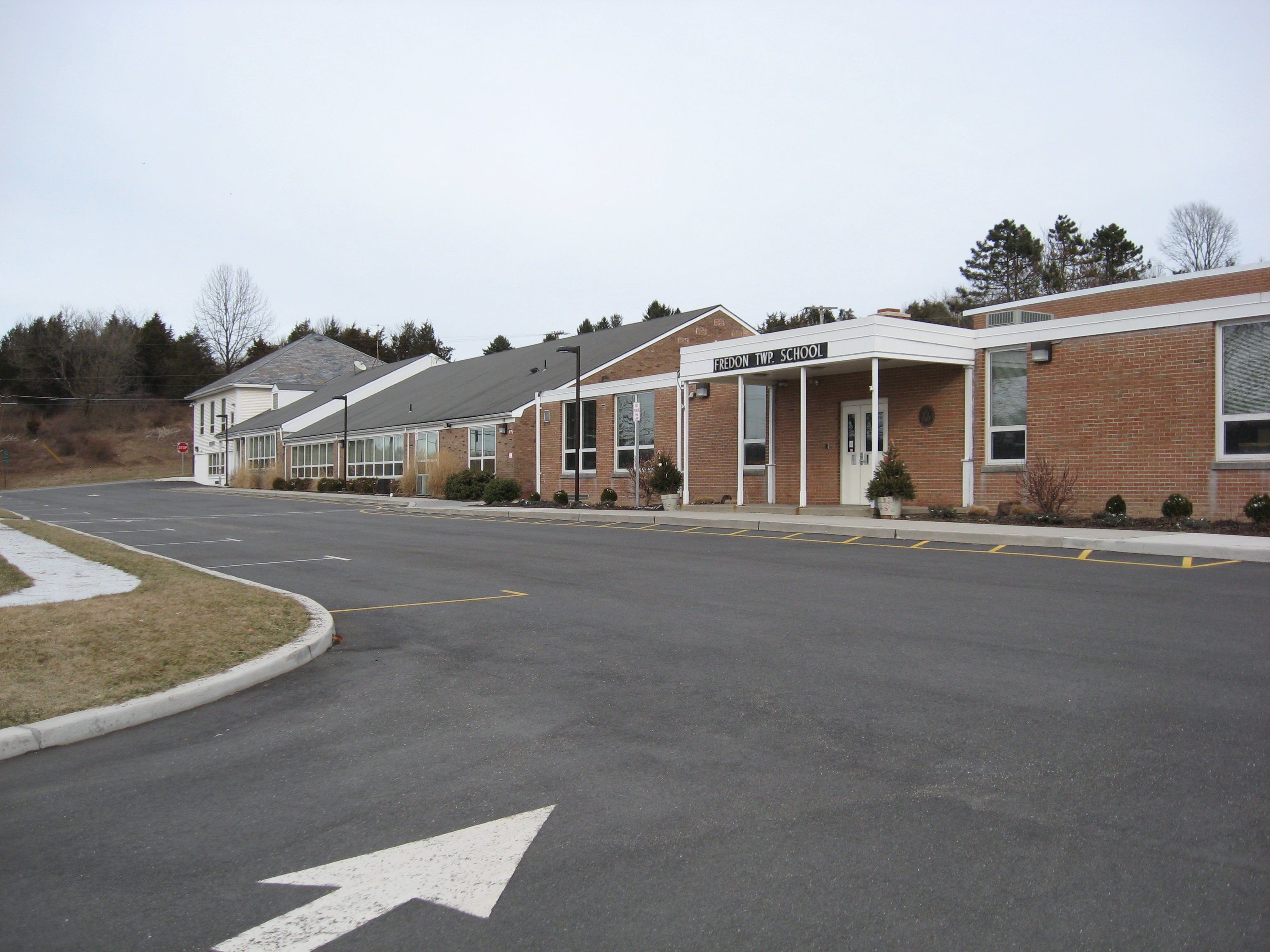
Fredon Elementary School in Fredon Township offers a comprehensive K-6 education. The school was awarded the National Blue Ribbon Award for Academic Excellence by the U.S. Department of Education in 2001.

Before 1942, Sussex County had over 100 school districts. Most of these districts were in rural townships that each had several districts—each district operating a one-room schoolhouse that served their small neighborhoods. During the forty-year tenure (1903–1942) of County School Superintendent Ralph Decker, the local government began to consolidate these small districts into larger municipality-wide or regional school districts.

The public school system in Sussex County offers a "thorough and efficient" education for children between the ages of five and eighteen years (grades K–12), as required by state constitution, through nine local and regional public high school districts, and twenty public primary or elementary school districts. Because of its distance from other county high schools and the higher costs of busing students one of those locations, Montague Township (the northernmost municipality in the state) sends most of its middle school (grades 7–8) and high school students (grades 9–12) to Port Jervis, New York for schooling. However, in 2013, Montague began exploring alternatives that would involve keeping their students in-state by sending them to High Point Regional High School in neighboring Wantage Township. Several of the county's schools are highly ranked by both state and federal education departments; some of which have achieved the U.S. Department of Education Blue Ribbon School Award. The county's Board of County Commissioners oversees the Sussex County Technical School (formerly the Sussex County Vocational-Technical School), a county-wide technical high school in Sparta Township.

Pope John XXIII Regional High School in Sparta operates under the auspices of the Roman Catholic Diocese of Paterson, which also operates Reverend George A. Brown Memorial School (PreK-4) and Pope John XXIII Middle School in Sparta. There are several other private schools in the county.

Sussex County's 10 high schools compete in interscholastic sports and other athletic activities sanctioned by the New Jersey State Interscholastic Athletic Association (NJSIAA). In 2009, the NJSIAA reorganized statewide athletic leagues into regional conferences. Prior to this reorganization, these schools competed under the auspices of the Sussex County Interscholastic League (SCIL), a now-defunct county-wide conference affiliated with NJSIAA. SCIL and other Morris and Warren County high schools compete under the NJSIAA's Northwest Jersey Athletic Conference.

School districts, all classified as K-12 (except as indicated), include:

K-12

- Hopatcong Public Schools (K-12)
- Newton Public School District (K-12)
- Sparta Township Public School District (K-12)
- Vernon Township School District (K-12)

Elementary (K-8, except as listed)

- Andover Regional School District
- Byram Township School District
- Frankford Township School District
- Franklin Borough School District
- Fredon Township School (K-6)
- Green Township School District
- Hamburg School District
- Hampton Township School District (K-6)
- Hardyston Township School District
- Lafayette Township School District
- Montague Township School District
- Ogdensburg Borough School District
- Sandyston-Walpack Consolidated School District (K-6)
- Stanhope Public Schools
- Stillwater Township School District (K-6)
- Sussex-Wantage Regional School District

Secondary (9–12, except as indicated)

- High Point Regional High School
- Kittatinny Regional High School (7–12)
- Lenape Valley Regional High School
- Sussex County Vocational School District
- Wallkill Valley Regional High School

=== Higher education ===
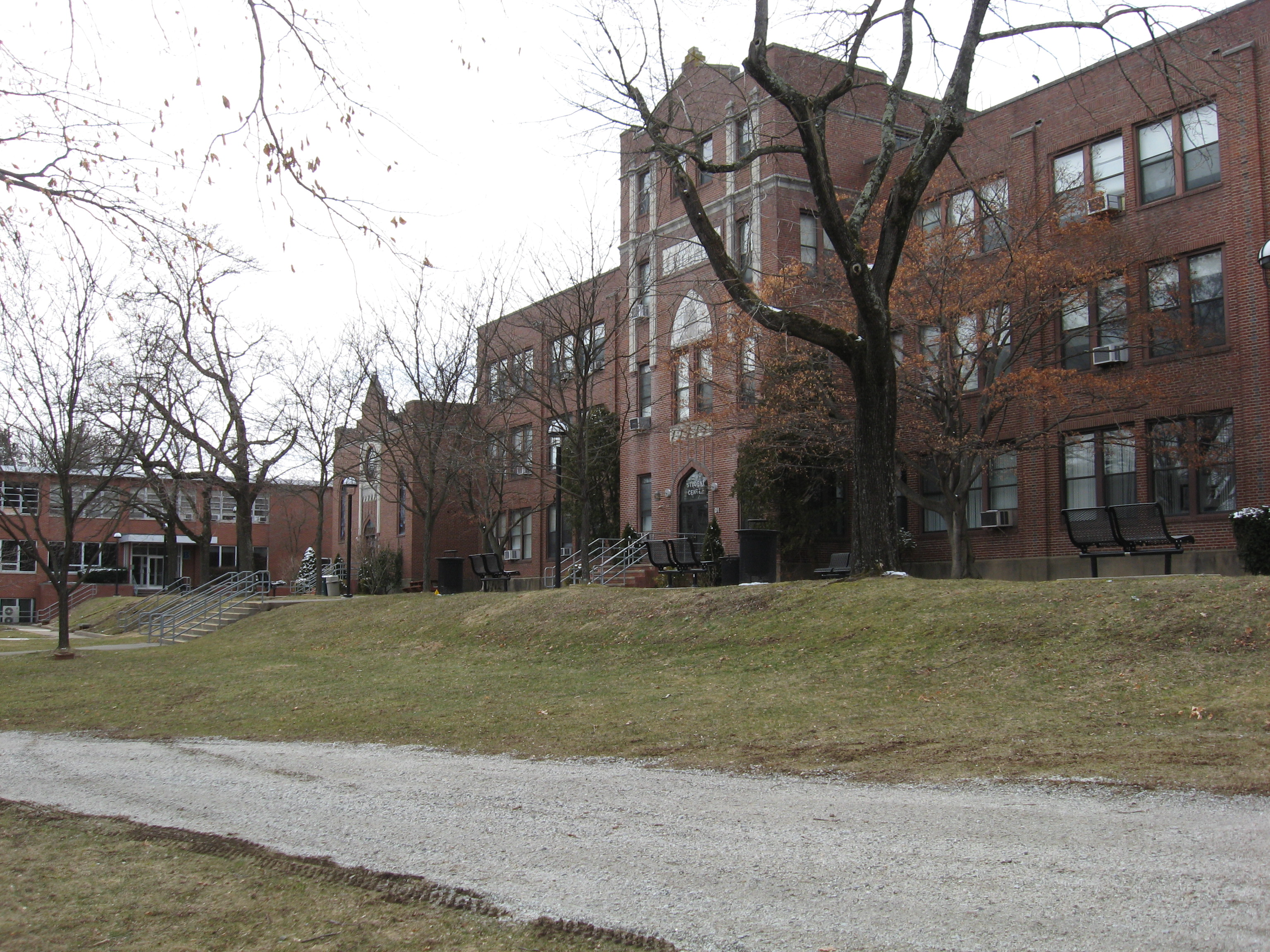
Formerly a Roman Catholic seminary, the county purchased the school facilities on the outskirts of Newton from the diocese in 1989 for the use of Sussex County Community College, founded in 1981.

Sussex County Community College (commonly referred to as SCCC), which opened in 1982, is an accredited, co-educational, two-year, public, community college located on a 167-acre (68 ha) campus in Newton. The SCCC campus was the site of Don Bosco College, a Roman Catholic seminary operated by the Salesian Order from 1928 until it was closed in the early 1980s and its campus sold to the Sussex County government on June 22, 1989, for US$4,209,800.

SCCC was authorized as a "college commission" in 1981 and began operations the following year. It became fully accredited in 1993 by the Commission on Higher Education of the Middle States Association of Colleges and Schools. SCCC offers 40 associate degree and 16 post-secondary professional and health science certificate programs available both at traditional classes at its campus, through hybrid and online classes, and through distance learning. Many students who attend SCCC transfer to pursue the completion of their undergraduate college education at a four-year college or university. The college also offers programs for advanced high school students, community education courses, and programs in cooperation with the New Jersey Department of Labor and Workforce Development. As of 2015, SCCC reported an enrollment of 2,738 students of which 55% attend full-time and 45% attended part-time.

Before it closed in 1995, Upsala College, a Lutheran-affiliated college in East Orange, New Jersey, operated a 245-acre (99-hectare) satellite campus in Wantage Township which it named the "Wirth Campus". In 1978, the land known as "Twin Ponds Farm" had been donated by Wallace "Wally" Wirths (1921–2002), a former Westinghouse Corporation executive, author, local newspaper columnist and radio commentator. The school had considered moving to Sussex County as East Orange's crime problem and social conditions deteriorated in the 1970s. However, declining enrollment and financial difficulties forced the school to close. The Wirths family bought back the farm for $75,000.

== Recreation ==
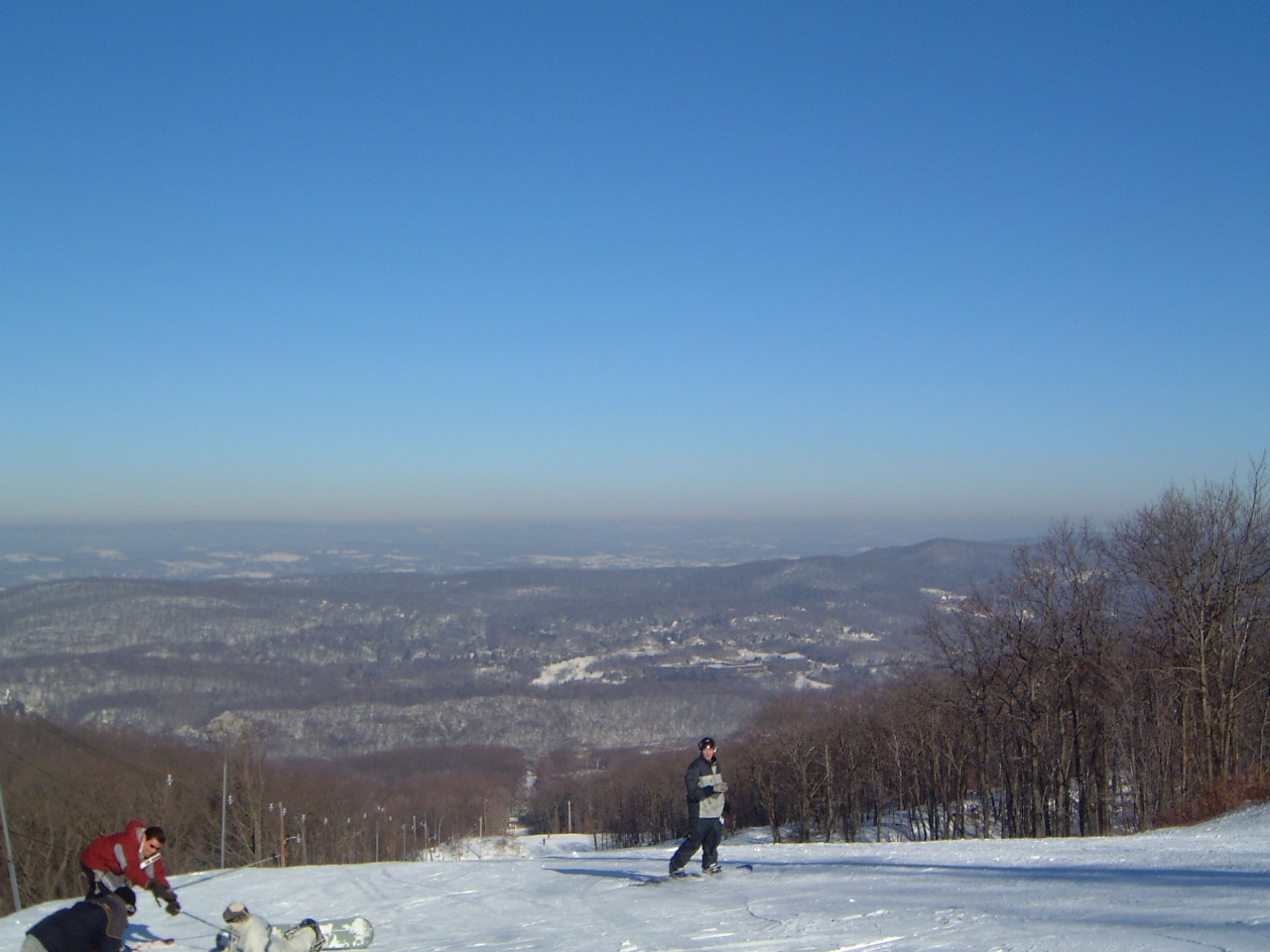
The Mountain Creek resort in Vernon Township offers skiing, snowboarding, and other winter sports activities in the Vernon Valley.

Sussex County is part of the Skylands Region, a term promoted by the New Jersey Commerce, Economic Growth, & Tourism Commission to encourage regional tourism. New Jersey ranks fifth in the nation in revenues generated from tourism.

=== Agritourism ===
Local dairy farmers have had to adapt to a declining milk and dairy industry and reacclimate to changing economic conditions by seeking new sources of revenue. Combining their agricultural production while promoting tourism, "Agritourism" has created opportunities for farmers. Many Sussex County farms offer corn field mazes, "u-pick" or "pick your own" fruits and vegetables—especially for apples, strawberries, pumpkins and Christmas trees during their respective harvest seasons.

New Jersey's wine industry has benefited from the recent easing of state alcohol licensing laws and from new promotional and marketing programs offered by the state's Department of Agriculture. Of the state's 46 licensed wineries, Sussex County is home to three: Cava Winery & Vineyard in Hamburg, Ventimiglia Vineyard in Wantage Township, and Westfall Winery in Montague Township.

=== State and federal protected areas ===
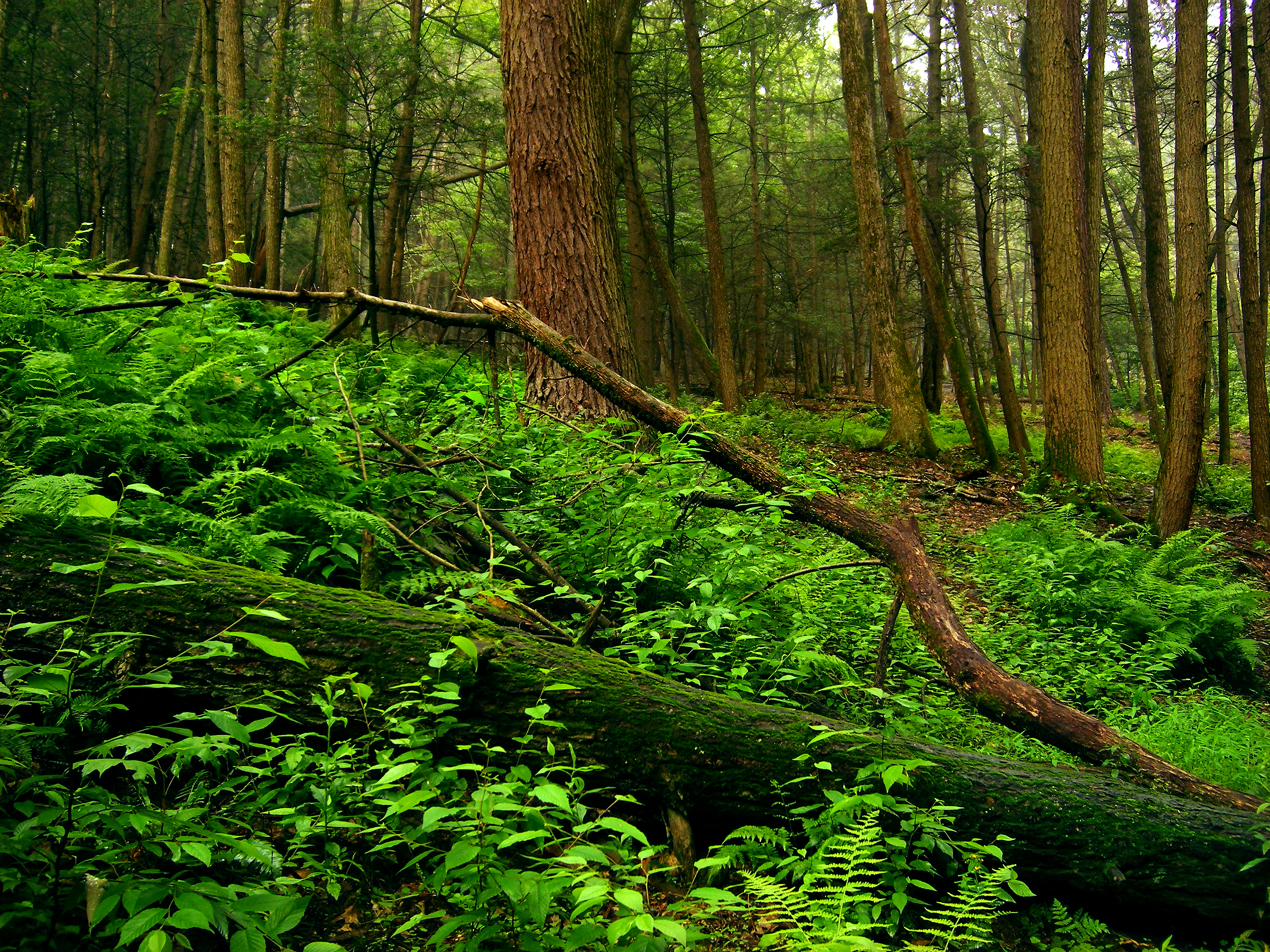
Operated by the New Jersey Division of Parks and Forestry, Stokes State Forest covers 16,025 acres (64.85 km^{2}) on Kittatinny Mountain in Montague, Sandyston, and Frankford townships. It was created by a donation of land to the state by New Jersey Governor Edward C. Stokes in 1907.

A large percentage of Sussex County is undeveloped because it has been reserved as one of 11 federal or state parks or as part of several wildlife management areas.

Under the National Park Service

- Appalachian National Scenic Trail (shared by 14 states)
- Delaware Water Gap National Recreation Area (shared with Pennsylvania)
- Middle Delaware National Scenic River (shared with Pennsylvania)

Under the U.S. Fish and Wildlife Service

- Wallkill River National Wildlife Refuge (shared with New York)

Under the New Jersey Division of Parks and Forestry

- Allamuchy Mountain State Park
- High Point State Park
- Hopatcong State Park
- Kittatinny Valley State Park
- Stokes State Forest
- Swartswood State Park
- Wawayanda State Park

New Jersey Division of Fish and Wildlife

- Bear Swamp Wildlife Management Area
- Culvers Brook Access Wildlife Management Area
- Flatbrook-Roy Wildlife Management Area
- Hainesville Wildlife Management Area
- Hamburg Mountain (North) Wildlife Management Area
- Hamburg Mountain (South) Wildlife Management Area
- Little Flatbrook Access Wildlife Management Area
- Paulinskill River Wildlife Management Area
- Sparta Mountain (North) Wildlife Management Area
- Sparta Mountain (South) Wildlife Management Area
- Trout Brook Wildlife Management Area
- Walpack Wildlife Management Area
- Weldon Brook Wildlife Management Area
- Whittingham Wildlife Management Area

=== Libraries ===
The basement of the Sussex County Hall of Records was the home to the first official Sussex County Library when it opened its doors on May 15, 1942. A 1936 International book truck was used to mobilize the more than 8,000 books the library had amassed by the end of their first year. Today, the Sussex Library County System (SLCS) circulates over 600,000 items through its six branches.

The Main Library is located in Newton and is where all new materials are procured and then distributed to the five branch libraries. The five branch libraries are the Dennis Memorial Branch, named for Mr. Alfred L. Dennis who gifted a sum of $25,000 to build the first library (the Dennis Library) in the county in 1872. The Dorothy Henry Branch, located in Vernon, was renamed in 1981 after the passing of the county's first librarian. The Franklin Branch, which opened in 1964, was the first official branch of the Sussex County Library System. The Louise Childs branch, located in Stanhope, opened in 1981 and was named in memory of Edith Louise Childs, who served for twenty-one years as Sussex County Clerk of the Board. Finally, the Sussex-Wantage branch which was formerly known as the Sussex Public Library, is located in Wantage.

The county's six libraries supply residents with e-books, audiobooks, downloadable audio books, magazines and newspapers, DVDs, videogames, CDs and databases that cover subjects from alchemy to zoology. All six locations have computers with high-speed internet access, Wi-Fi, and meeting rooms available for use by the public.

To check out the SCLS website, go to http://www.sussexcountylibrary.org

=== Skiing and winter sports ===
In the 1960s, Vernon Township became a location for skiing and winter sports.

- Mountain Creek
- Hidden Valley - Since January 2016, the area has been repurposed as the National Winter Activity Center, which provides education and ski / snowboard instruction to groups that might not have access to winter sports.

=== Sports franchises ===
Sussex County has one large venue for professional sports, Skylands Stadium, a 4,200-seat baseball stadium located in the Augusta section of Frankford Township near the intersection of U.S. Route 206, New Jersey Route 15, and County Route 565. In 2013, Skylands Park was acquired by investor Mark Roscioli Jr., of 17 Mile, LLC for $950,000. Roscioli, who admitted a lack of experience in sports management, then sold the facility to Al Dorso, who operates the annual State Fair Meadowlands., Dorso bought the facility with the intention of bringing baseball and other activities back to the stadium, which he achieved in late 2014 with the announcement of the Sussex County Miners, who began playing the following year.

With the rise of professional Minor League Baseball in the 1990s, Sussex County became the home to the New Jersey Cardinals, a Class A-Short Season affiliate of Major League Baseball's St. Louis Cardinals franchise in 1994. The Cardinals, previously the Glens Falls Redbirds (1981–93) from upstate New York, won the New York–Penn League's championship in their 1994 inaugural season. They had one other winning season (in 2002) and in 2005 the owners sold the team—which was then moved to University Park, Pennsylvania and renamed the State College Spikes. They are now affiliated with MLB's Pittsburgh Pirates franchise. In 2006, Skylands Park became the home of the Sussex Skyhawks an affiliate of the Canadian American Association of Professional Baseball (or Can-Am League). The team were League Champions during the 2008 season. The team ceased operations after the 2010 season.

Sussex was re-introduced to the Can-Am League in 2015, when the Miners began play that season. After experiencing growing pains their first three seasons, the Miners broke through in 2018 when they posted a 63–38 record and won the league championship in 2018. They appeared in the following championship the following season, but fell to the New Jersey Jackals, also owned by Dorso. After the 2019 season, the Miners, along with four other Can-Am teams, joined the Frontier League after the two independent leagues merged. The Miners began Frontier League play in 2021 after the league canceled its 2020 season due to the COVID-19 pandemic.

=== Sussex County Fairgrounds ===
The Sussex County Farm and Horse Show in the Augusta of Frankford Township, which has operated since 1940, has been known as the New Jersey State Fair since 1999.

The fair grounds is also host to the Sussex County Poultry Fanciers Spring and Fall shows. In 2019 the Serama Council of North America (SCNA) will hold Jersey's first ever SCNA Serama Table Top show

=== Outdoor recreation ===
The Paulins Kill (shown here, near Stillwater), is a popular destination for fly-fishermen in pursuit of trout.

There are 12 wildlife management areas located in Sussex County for hunting, fishing, trapping, hiking, snowshoeing and cross country skiing, covering more than 15,000 acres (6,100 ha). There are also several state forests and state parks.

== See also ==
- List of Sussex County, New Jersey people
- National Register of Historic Places listings in Sussex County, New Jersey
