= Ogdensburg Borough School District =

School district in Sussex County, New Jersey, US

Coordinates: 41.079911°N 74.593255°W

Address
- 100 Main Street Ogdensburg, Sussex County, New Jersey, 07439; United States

District information
- Grades: PreK-8
- Superintendent: David Astor
- Business administrator: Richard Rennie
- Schools: 1

Students and staff
- Enrollment: 281 (as of 2022–23)
- Faculty: 27.3 FTEs
- Student–teacher ratio: 10.3:1

Other information
- District Factor Group: FG
- Website: District website
| Ind. | Per pupil | District spending | Rank (*) | K-8 average | %± vs. average |
|---|---|---|---|---|---|
| 1A | Total Spending | $16,414 | 12 | $18,891 | −13.1% |
| 1 | Budgetary Cost | 14,214 | 26 | 14,159 | 0.4% |
| 2 | Classroom Instruction | 8,015 | 18 | 8,659 | −7.4% |
| 6 | Support Services | 2,218 | 26 | 2,167 | 2.4% |
| 8 | Administrative Cost | 1,909 | 64 | 1,547 | 23.4% |
| 10 | Operations & Maintenance | 1,783 | 37 | 1,612 | 10.6% |
| 13 | Extracurricular Activities | 289 | 57 | 104 | 177.9% |
| 16 | Median Teacher Salary | 52,820 | 11 | 61,136 |
Data from NJDoE 2014 Taxpayers' Guide to Education Spending. *Of K-8 districts with up to 400 students. Lowest spending=1; Highest=71

The Ogdensburg Borough School District is a comprehensive community public school district that serves students in pre-kindergarten through eighth grade from Ogdensburg, in Sussex County, in the U.S. state of New Jersey.

As of the 2022–23 school year, the district, comprised of one school, had an enrollment of 281 students and 27.3 classroom teachers (on an FTE basis), for a student–teacher ratio of 10.3:1.

The district is classified by the New Jersey Department of Education as being in District Factor Group "FG", the fourth-highest of eight groupings. District Factor Groups organize districts statewide to allow comparison by common socioeconomic characteristics of the local districts. From lowest socioeconomic status to highest, the categories are A, B, CD, DE, FG, GH, I and J.

For ninth through twelfth grades, public school students attend Wallkill Valley Regional High School which also serves students from Franklin Borough, Hardyston Township and Hamburg Borough. As of the 2018–19 school year, the high school had an enrollment of 604 students and 56.0 classroom teachers (on an FTE basis), for a student–teacher ratio of 10.8:1.

== Schools ==
Schools in the district (with 2018–19 enrollment data from the National Center for Education Statistics) are:

Elementary schools (PreK-8)

- Ogdensburg Public School (235 students)
  - David Astor, principal

== Administration ==
Core members of the district's administration are:

- David Astor, superintendent and principal
- Richard Rennie, business administrator and board secretary

== Board of education ==
The district's board of education, comprised of seven members, sets policy and oversees the fiscal and educational operation of the district through its administration. As a Type II school district, the board's trustees are elected directly by voters to serve three-year terms of office on a staggered basis, with either two or three seats up for election each year held (since 2012) as part of the November general election. The board appoints a superintendent to oversee the district's day-to-day operations and a business administrator to supervise the business functions of the district.
