= Stanhope Public Schools =

School district in Sussex County, New Jersey, US

Address
- 24 Valley Road Stanhope, Sussex County, 07874; United States
- Coordinates: 40.914448°N 74.705514°W

District information
- Grades: K-8
- Superintendent: Steven Hagemann
- Business administrator: Debi LeBrun
- Schools: 1

Students and staff
- Enrollment: 302 (as of 2022–23)
- Faculty: 31.8 FTEs
- Student–teacher ratio: 9.5:1

Other information
- District Factor Group: GH
- Website: www.stanhopeschools.org
Ind.	Per pupil	District spending	Rank (*)	K-8 average	%± vs. average
1A	Total Spending	$17,131	20	$18,891	−9.3%
1	Budgetary Cost	13,564	16	14,159	−4.2%
2	Classroom Instruction	7,579	12	8,659	−12.5%
6	Support Services	2,568	38	2,167	18.5%
8	Administrative Cost	1,968	66	1,547	27.2%
10	Operations & Maintenance	1,351	15	1,612	−16.2%
13	Extracurricular Activities	97	23	104	−6.7%
16	Median Teacher Salary	58,220	36	61,136
Data from NJDoE 2014 Taxpayers' Guide to Education Spending. *Of K-8 districts with up to 400 students. Lowest spending=1; Highest=71

The Stanhope Public Schools is a community public school district that serves students in kindergarten through eighth grade from Stanhope, in Sussex County, in the U.S. state of New Jersey.

As of the 2022–23 school year, the district, comprised of one school, had an enrollment of 302 students and 31.8 classroom teachers (on an FTE basis), for a student–teacher ratio of 9.5:1.

The district is classified by the New Jersey Department of Education as being in District Factor Group "GH", the third-highest of eight groupings. District Factor Groups organize districts statewide to allow comparison by common socioeconomic characteristics of the local districts. From lowest socioeconomic status to highest, the categories are A, B, CD, DE, FG, GH, I and J.

For ninth through twelfth grades, the borough shares Lenape Valley Regional High School, which serves public school students from Netcong in Morris County and the Sussex County community of Byram Township. As of the 2021–22 school year, the high school had an enrollment of 657 students and 54.1 classroom teachers (on an FTE basis), for a student–teacher ratio of 12.1:1. Students from the borough had attended Sparta High School until 1974, when the Lenape Valley district was created.

== Schools ==
Schools in the district (with 2021–22 enrollment from the National Center for Education Statistics) are:

- Valley Road Elementary (PreK-8; 299)
  - Alicia Finklea-DiCataldo, principal

== Administration ==
Core members of the district's administration are:

- Steven Hagemann, superintendent
- Debi LeBrun, business administrator and board secretary

== Board of education ==
The district's board of education, comprised of seven members, sets policy and oversees the fiscal and educational operation of the district through its administration. As a Type II school district, the board's trustees are elected directly by voters to serve three-year terms of office on a staggered basis, with either two or three seats up for election each year held (since 2012) as part of the November general election. The board appoints a superintendent to oversee the district's day-to-day operations and a business administrator to supervise the business functions of the district.
