= Hamburg School District (New Jersey) =

School district in Sussex County, New Jersey, US

Address
- 30 Linwood Avenue Hamburg, Sussex County, New Jersey, 07419; United States
- Coordinates: 41.153849°N 74.574276°W

District information
- Grades: PreK-8
- Superintendent: Kimberly Sigman
- Business administrator: Amanda Weaver
- Schools: 1

Students and staff
- Enrollment: 246 (as of 2024–25)
- Faculty: 30.1 FTEs
- Student–teacher ratio: 8.2:1

Other information
- District Factor Group: DE
- Website: hamburgschool.com
Ind.	Per pupil	District spending	Rank (*)	K-8 average	%± vs. average
1A	Total Spending	$21,283	49	$18,891	12.7%
1	Budgetary Cost	18,305	57	14,159	29.3%
2	Classroom Instruction	10,862	60	8,659	25.4%
6	Support Services	2,475	34	2,167	14.2%
8	Administrative Cost	1,978	69	1,547	27.9%
10	Operations & Maintenance	2,699	59	1,612	67.4%
13	Extracurricular Activities	244	53	104	134.6%
16	Median Teacher Salary	64,123	61	61,136
Data from NJDoE 2014 Taxpayers' Guide to Education Spending. *Of K-8 districts with up to 400 students. Lowest spending=1; Highest=71

The Hamburg School District is a comprehensive community public school district that serves students in pre-kindergarten through eighth grade from Hamburg, in Sussex County, in the U.S. state of New Jersey.

As of the 2024–25 school year, the district, comprised of one school, had an enrollment of 246 students and 30.1 classroom teachers (on an FTE basis), for a student–teacher ratio of 8.2:1.

For ninth through twelfth grades, public school students attend Wallkill Valley Regional High School which also serves students from Franklin, Hardyston Township and Ogdensburg, as part of the Wallkill Valley Regional High School District. As of the 2024–25 school year, the high school had an enrollment of 581 students and 49.4 classroom teachers (on an FTE basis), for a student–teacher ratio of 11.8:1.

== History ==
The district had been classified by the New Jersey Department of Education as being in District Factor Group "DE", the fifth-highest of eight groupings. District Factor Groups organize districts statewide to allow comparison by common socioeconomic characteristics of the local districts. From lowest socioeconomic status to highest, the categories are A, B, CD, DE, FG, GH, I and J.

In 2024, the Wallkill Valley district began a regionalization process with its constituent municipalities to consider the formation of a common K–12 district.

== Schools ==
Schools in the district (with 2024–25 enrollment data from the National Center for Education Statistics) are:

Elementary school

- Hamburg School, with 235 students in grades PreK–8

== Administration ==
Core members of the district's administration are:

- Kimberly Sigman, superintendent
- Amanda Weaver, business administrator and board secretary

== Board of education ==
The district's board of education, comprised of seven members, sets policy and oversees the fiscal and educational operation of the district through its administration. As a Type II school district, the board's trustees are elected directly by voters to serve three-year terms of office on a staggered basis, with two or three seats up for election each year held (since 2012) as part of the November general election. The board appoints a superintendent to oversee the district's day-to-day operations and a business administrator to supervise the business functions of the district.
