= Newton Airport (New Jersey) =

- IATA: none; ICAO: none; FAA LID: 3N5

Summary
- Airport type: Public use
- Owner: RRL Group
- Operator: Stella Jump
- Serves: Newton, New Jersey
- Location: Sussex County, New Jersey
- Elevation AMSL: 620 ft / 189 m
- Coordinates: 41°01′38″N 074°45′31″W

Map
- Interactive map of Newton Airport

Runways
Direction	Length		Surface
Direction	ft	m	Surface
6/24	2,546	776	Asphalt

Statistics (2008)
- Aircraft operations: 10,705
- Based aircraft: 18
- Source: Federal Aviation Administration

Newton Airport (FAA LID: 3N5) was a privately owned, public-use airport three miles south of Newton, in Sussex County, New Jersey. It closed in 2013, after it was purchased for $3.5M by Public Service Electric & Gas Company to be used to stage electrical power equipment used in constructing new transmission lines. FAA removed it from the A/FD and listed it as closed in the June 27, 2013 edition.

== Facilities ==
Newton Airport covered 90 acres (36 ha); its asphalt runway was 6/24 2,546 x 45 ft. In 2008 the airport had 10,695 general aviation operations. 18 aircraft were then based at this airport: 56% ultralight, 39% single-engine and 6% helicopter.

== Redevelopment ==
As of 2026, Andover Township is trying to attract data center construction on the property, and has modified zoning rules to allow that use. There is opposition to the move by some residents.
