= Serama Council of North America =

The Serama Council of North America (SCNA) is the oldest and most established organization promoting Serama and American Serama in North America.

The Serama Council of North America is a non-profit organization founded in 2003, by Jerry Schexnayder of Louisiana, two years after he imported the Serama from Malaysia. It is the original, and the largest Serama Breed Club in North America. The Serama is quickly becoming the most popular bantam in the United States, and SCNA members have organized shows and events in nearly every region.

== Goals and Objectives ==
- To create and foster a spirit of understanding among the people involved and interested in the Serama breed in all its types and varieties.
- To encourage people to serve the Serama poultry fancier's community without personal gain and promote high ethical standards in the commerce, industry, professions, public work and private endeavors related to the Serama breed.
- To do all possible to bring the natural qualities of the Serama breed to perfection through selective breeding.
- To educate members and urge breeders to adhere to the standards of the breed types as approved by SCNA.
- To pursue the acceptance by The American Poultry Association (“APA”) and the American Bantam Association (“ABA”) of the American Serama for showing and judging purposes, and to support the addition of new varieties for acceptance.
- To encourage the breeding and showing of the Traditional and the Ayam Serama in Table Top only.
- To do all in its power to protect and advance the interests of the breed and to encourage sportsmanlike competition at meets, matches and shows.
- To sponsor and conduct national, district and state meets, sanctioned matches, and specialty shows under the rules of the SCNA.
- To assist, encourage, and help educate the junior poultry enthusiast in the sound and practical value of breeding the Serama to a Type Standard.
- To encourage the development of Table Top Serama shows as a window of education for both breeder and public, and as a means to interest young future breeders into becoming SERAMA poultry fanciers themselves.

In American Poultry Association and American Bantam Association Events, the SCNA promotes and petitions breeders to breed American Serama matching type, weight, and color standards as accepted by the ABA/APA. The SCNA is also the leader and largest promoter of Serama tabletop exhibition.
