= Green Township School District =

School district in Sussex County, New Jersey, US

Address
- 69 Mackerley Road Greendell, Sussex County, New Jersey, 07839; United States
- Coordinates: 40.972191°N 74.818977°W

District information
- Grades: kindergarten-eighth grade
- Superintendent: Jennifer Cenatiempo
- Business administrator: Karen Constantino
- Schools: 1

Students and staff
- Enrollment: 401 (as of 2023–24)
- Faculty: 42.7 FTEs
- Student–teacher ratio: 9.4:1

Other information
- District Factor Group: I
- Website: www.greenhills.org
Ind.	Per pupil	District spending	Rank (*)	K-8 average	%± vs. average
1A	Total Spending	$17,245	22	$18,891	−8.7%
1	Budgetary Cost	13,926	30	14,159	−1.6%
2	Classroom Instruction	8,504	31	8,659	−1.8%
6	Support Services	1,843	17	2,167	−15.0%
8	Administrative Cost	1,981	60	1,547	28.1%
10	Operations & Maintenance	1,482	25	1,612	−8.1%
13	Extracurricular Activities	105	27	104	1.0%
16	Median Teacher Salary	67,465	53	61,136
Data from NJDoE 2014 Taxpayers' Guide to Education Spending. *Of K-8 districts with 401-750 students. Lowest spending=1; Highest=64

The Green Township School District is a comprehensive community public school district that serves students in kindergarten through eighth grade from Green Township, in Sussex County, in the U.S. state of New Jersey.

As of the 2023–24 school year, the district, comprised of one school, had an enrollment of 401 students and 42.7 classroom teachers (on an FTE basis), for a student–teacher ratio of 9.4:1.

The district has participated in the Interdistrict Public School Choice Program since its inception in 2013, which allows non-resident students to attend school in the district at no cost to their parents, with tuition covered by the resident district. Available slots are announced annually by grade.

Public school students in ninth through twelfth grades attend Newton High School in Newton, together with students from Andover Borough and Andover Township, as part of a sending/receiving relationship with the Newton Public School District. As of the 2023–24 school year, the high school had an enrollment of 723 students and 60.0 classroom teachers (on an FTE basis), for a student–teacher ratio of 12.1:1.

== History ==
The earliest school in Green Township was established near Huntsville in 1790, and there were four schools in the township by 1902, including in the Tranquility section. A school in Huntsville that had been constructed in 1865 was in the path of the route of the Delaware, Lackawanna and Western Railroad's Lackawanna Cut-off, so the company agreed to arrange for the construction of a new school facility.

The district had been classified by the New Jersey Department of Education as being in District Factor Group "I", the second-highest of eight groupings. District Factor Groups organize districts statewide to allow comparison by common socioeconomic characteristics of the local districts. From lowest socioeconomic status to highest, the categories are A, B, CD, DE, FG, GH, I and J.

== School ==
As of the 2023–24 school year, Green Hills School has an enrollment of 398 students in grades K–8.

- Jon Paul Bollette, principal

== Administration ==
Core members of the district's administration are:

- Jennifer Cenatiempo, superintendent
- Karen Constantino, business administrator and board secretary

== Board of education ==
The district's board of education, comprised of nine members, sets policy and oversees the fiscal and educational operation of the district through its administration. As a Type II school district, the board's trustees are elected directly by voters to serve three-year terms of office on a staggered basis, with three seats up for election each year held (since 2013) as part of the November general election. The board appoints a superintendent to oversee the district's day-to-day operations and a business administrator to supervise the business functions of the district.
