= Andover Regional School District =

School district in Sussex County, New Jersey, US

Address
- 707 Limecrest Road Newton, Sussex County, New Jersey, 07860; United States
- Coordinates: 41.032544°N 74.705284°W

District information
- Grades: PreK-8
- Superintendent: John Fritzky
- Business administrator: Nicole Sylvester
- Schools: 2

Students and staff
- Enrollment: 449 (as of 2023–24)
- Faculty: 53.0 FTEs
- Student–teacher ratio: 8.5:1

Other information
- District Factor Group: FG
- Website: www.andoverregional.org
Ind.	Per pupil	District spending	Rank (*)	K-8 average	%± vs. average
1A	Total Spending	$19,326	43	$18,891	2.3%
1	Budgetary Cost	14,574	36	14,159	2.9%
2	Classroom Instruction	8,823	36	8,659	1.9%
6	Support Services	2,255	34	2,167	4.1%
8	Administrative Cost	1,828	48	1,547	18.2%
10	Operations & Maintenance	1,546	31	1,612	−4.1%
13	Extracurricular Activities	123	32	104	18.3%
16	Median Teacher Salary	65,998	47	61,136
Data from NJDoE 2014 Taxpayers' Guide to Education Spending. *Of K-8 districts with 401-750 students. Lowest spending=1; Highest=64

The Andover Regional School District is a regional public school district in Sussex County, in the U.S. state of New Jersey, serving students in pre-kindergarten through eighth grade in the communities of Andover Borough and Andover Township.

As of the 2023–24 school year, the district, comprised of two schools, had an enrollment of 449 students and 53.0 classroom teachers (on an FTE basis), for a student–teacher ratio of 8.5:1.

The district had been classified by the New Jersey Department of Education as being in District Factor Group "FG", the fourth-highest of eight groupings. District Factor Groups organize districts statewide to allow comparison by common socioeconomic characteristics of the local districts. From lowest socioeconomic status to highest, the categories are A, B, CD, DE, FG, GH, I and J.

Public school students in ninth through twelfth grades from both Andover Borough and Andover Township attend Newton High School in Newton, together with students from Green Township, as part of a sending/receiving relationship with the Newton Public School District. As of the 2023–24 school year, the high school had an enrollment of 723 students and 60.0 classroom teachers (on an FTE basis), for a student–teacher ratio of 12.1:1.

The district participates in the Interdistrict Public School Choice Program, which allows non-resident students to attend the district's school without cost to their parents, with tuition covered by the State of New Jersey. Available slots are announced annually by grade.

== Schools ==
Schools in the district (with 2023–24 enrollment data from the National Center for Education Statistics) are:

- Florence M. Burd Elementary School with 218 students in grades PreK-4
  - Nicole Dilkes, principal
- Long Pond Middle School with 195 students in grades 5-8
  - Bryan J. Fleming, principal

== Administration ==
Core members of the district's administration are:

- John Fritzky, superintendent of schools
- Nicole Sylvester, business administrator and board secretary

== Board of education ==
The district's board of education is comprised of nine members who set policy and oversee the fiscal and educational operation of the district through its administration. As a Type II school district, the board's trustees are elected directly by voters of the constituent municipalities to serve three-year terms of office on a staggered basis, with three seats up for election each year held (since 2012) as part of the November general election. The board appoints a superintendent to oversee the district's day-to-day operations and a business administrator to supervise the business functions of the district. Seats on the board are allocated based on population, with Andover Township assigned eight seats and Andover Borough assigned one seat.
