= Brighton, New Jersey =

Populated place in Sussex County, New Jersey, US

- Unincorporated community
- Location of Brighton in Sussex County Inset: Location of county within the state of New Jersey Brighton, New Jersey (New Jersey) Brighton, New Jersey (the United States)
- Coordinates: 40°59′06″N 74°45′49″W
- Country: United States
- State: New Jersey
- County: Sussex
- Township: Andover and Green Township
- Elevation: 561 ft (171 m)
- GNIS feature ID: 874942

Brighton is an unincorporated community located within Andover Township and Green Township in Sussex County, in the U.S. state of New Jersey.

Brighton is located approximately 1 mi (1.6 km) west of Andover Borough.

In 1872, it was noted that Brighton had a small number of houses.
