= Whitehall, New Jersey =

Populated place in Sussex County, New Jersey, US

- Unincorporated community
- Location within Sussex County. Inset: Location of Sussex County in the state of New Jersey. Whitehall, New Jersey (New Jersey) Whitehall, New Jersey (the United States)
- Coordinates: 40°57′52″N 74°44′22″W
- Country: United States
- State: New Jersey
- County: Sussex
- Township: Andover
- Elevation: 781 ft (238 m)
- GNIS feature ID: 881794

Whitehall is an unincorporated community located within Andover Township in Sussex County, in the U.S. state of New Jersey.

Whitehall is located approximately 1.5 mi (2.4 km) south of Andover.

Panther Lake, and the Panther Lake Camping Resort, occupy the east side of the settlement. Located west of Whitehall is the northern tip of Allamuchy Mountain State Park.

== History ==
The former Sussex Railroad passed through Whitehall.

In 1872, it was noted that the largest building in Whitehall "was formerly a tavern where the Newark and Oswego stages used to stop".
