= Trinca =

Trinca may refer to:

- Trinca Airport
- Trinca, Edineț, village in Moldova
- Trinca (comic), Spanish comic 1970-1973
- Trinca's, famous restaurant on Park Street, Kolkata
- Helen Trinca, Australian journalist
- Jasmine Trinca (1981), Italian actress
