= Stephen Bienko =

American coach and athlete

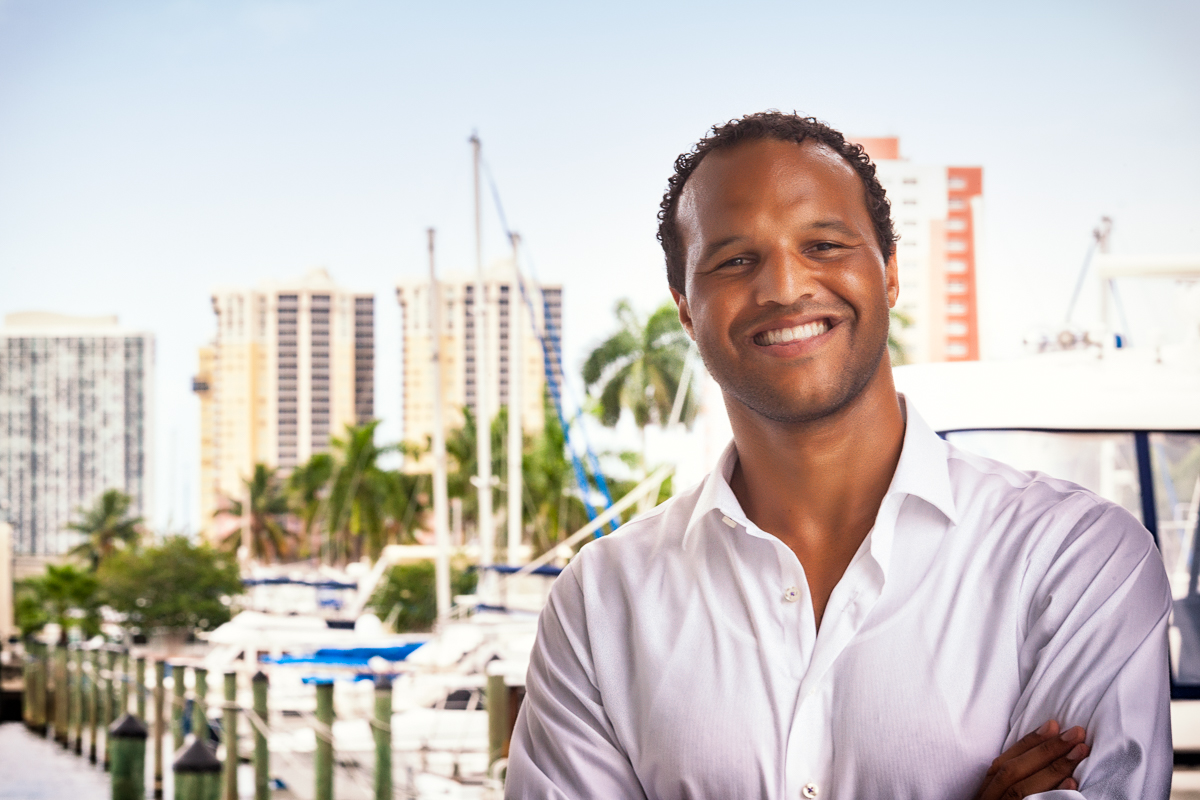
- Stephen Bienko, Fort Myers, Florida. 2015
- Born: New Jersey, United States
- Education: United States Air Force Academy, Villanova University
- Occupations: Businessman, entrepreneur, track and field coach
- Employer: The42U
- Known for: CEO at The42U
- Website: The42U

Stephen Bienko is an American businessman and athlete. He is best known as co-founder and CEO of The 42U, a student-athlete development and personal branding company. He is also the founding Director of the Institute of Athletic Performance, the former largest franchise owner of the College Hunks Hauling Junk brand.

== Early life ==
Bienko grew up in Green Township, New Jersey, and was a three-sport star during high school at the Delbarton School, where he graduated in 1994. Bienko attended the United States Air Force Academy and was a member of its football team. He later graduated from Villanova University, Pennsylvania. where he competed as a decathlete and held the school record in the discus from 1998 to 2005.

== Career ==
=== New Jersey State Police ===
Following his graduation from Villanova University, Bienko began his professional career with the New Jersey State Police, serving as a state trooper assigned to the Alcoholic Beverage Control Special Task Force Unit.

Management experience and College Hunks

After leaving law enforcement, Bienko held a number of business and marketing positions, including Director of Marketing at Kennedy Funding, Senior Vice President of SequentialT, and Director of Communications at Doyle Management Group.

Bienko spent two years driving the marketing of 2008 Olympic gold medalist in the decathlon, Bryan Clay.

Bienko later became involved in franchising through College Hunks Hauling Junk and Moving. By 2014, he was the largest franchise owner in the company's system, operating 16 territories across New Jersey, Florida, Tennessee, and Ohio with annual revenues exceeding $5 million.

In 2015, he ran for the Fort Myers City Council representing Ward 2 in the September 2015 primary election, but was defeated by incumbent Johnny W. Streets Jr.

=== 42U ===
In 2016, Bienko co-founded 42U, a student-athlete development company focused on personal branding, career preparation, and life-skills development. Under his leadership, the company has partnered with collegiate athletic programs and organizations to provide educational and professional development resources for student-athletes.

== Partnerships ==
On January 28, 2026, 42U announced a partnership with Rutgers University Athletics aimed at enhancing student-athlete development, including personal branding, psychological assessment, and career preparation programs. The collaboration integrates 42U's branding workshops and performance tools into Rutgers’ existing Scarlet Knights For Life program, positioning the university as a leader in holistic athlete development.

== Personal life ==
Bienko lives in Morristown, New Jersey with his four children.

Bienko previously served on the board of directors for the PACE School for Girls and Junior Achievement of Southwest Florida.
