= Greendell, New Jersey =

Populated place in Sussex County, New Jersey, US

- Unincorporated community
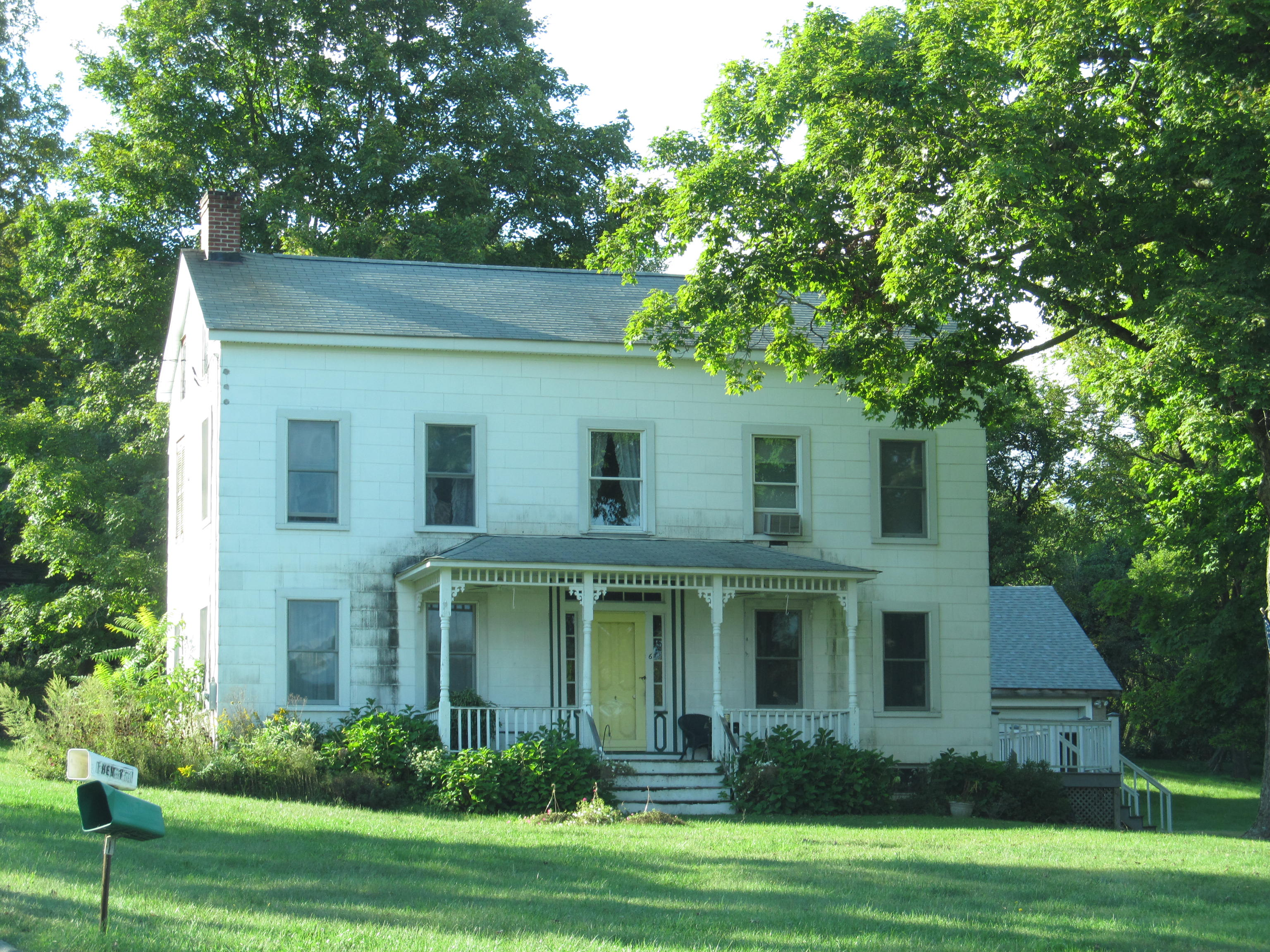

- Greendell's location in Sussex County (Inset: Sussex County in New Jersey) Greendell, New Jersey (New Jersey) Greendell, New Jersey (the United States)
- Coordinates: 40°58′26″N 74°49′16″W
- Country: United States
- State: New Jersey
- County: Sussex
- Elevation: 633 ft (193 m)
- Time zone: UTC−05:00 (Eastern (EST))
  - Summer (DST): UTC−04:00 (EDT)
- ZIP Code: 07839
- Area code: Area code 973
- GNIS feature ID: 876797

Greendell is an unincorporated community located within Green Township, in Sussex County, in the U.S. state of New Jersey. Greendell is 4.2 miles (6.8 km) west of Andover. Greendell has a post office with ZIP Code 07839.
