= Pinkneyville, New Jersey =

Populated place in Sussex County, New Jersey, US

- Unincorporated community
- Location within Sussex County. Inset: Location of Sussex County in the state of New Jersey. Pinkneyville, New Jersey (New Jersey) Pinkneyville, New Jersey (the United States)
- Coordinates: 41°02′47″N 74°41′33″W
- Country: United States
- State: New Jersey
- County: Sussex
- Township: Andover
- Named for: Merritt Pinkney
- Elevation: 597 ft (182 m)
- GNIS feature ID: 879333

Pinkneyville is an unincorporated community located within Andover Township in Sussex County, in the U.S. state of New Jersey.

The settlement is located approximately 3.7 mi (6.0 km) east of Newton.

In 1828, a gristmill and a blacksmith shop operated what was then a hamlet in Newton. Around 1834-35, Merritt Pinkney purchased 291 acres (118 ha) of farmland in the area. One cottage dated back to the late 1700s. When Andover Township was established on March 10, 1864, it included this land.

Pinkneyville was described in 1872 as "a little mining village, with only a few small cottages".

In 1891, the "remotest source" of the Pequest River was described as being "near Pinkneyville". A school, a cobbler shop and 10 private homes existed in the area, but by the 20th century all but a few houses were gone. As of 2018, the area had a limestone quarry, two housing complexes, an intermediate health care facility and a golf course.
