= Trinca Airport =

- IATA: none; ICAO: none; FAA LID: 13N

Summary
- Airport type: Public
- Owner: Green Township
- Operator: Linda Peralta
- Serves: Andover, New Jersey
- Location: Sussex County
- Elevation AMSL: 600 ft / 183 m
- Coordinates: 40°57′58″N 074°46′54″W

Map
- Interactive map of Trinca Airport

Runways
Direction	Length		Surface
Direction	ft	m	Surface
6/24	1,924	586	Turf

Statistics (2013)
- Aircraft operations: 11,395
- Based aircraft: 9
- Source: Federal Aviation Administration

Trinca Airport (FAA LID: 13N) was a public use airport in Sussex County, New Jersey, United States. The airport was owned by Green Township and located three nautical miles (6 km) southwest of the central business district of Andover. Purchased by the municipality of Green Township, Trinca was closed on September 30, 2020.

== Facilities and aircraft ==
Trinca Airport covered an area of 12 acres (5 ha) at an elevation of 600 feet (183 m) above mean sea level. It had one runway designated 6/24 with a turf surface measuring 1,924 by 135 feet (586 x 41 m).

For the 12-month period ending January 1, 2013, the airport had 11,395 general aviation aircraft operations, an average of 31 per day. At that time there were 10 aircraft based at this airport: 70% single-engine, 20% multi-engine, and 10% ultralight.

== See also ==
- List of airports in New Jersey
