= Andover Township, New Jersey =

Township in Sussex County, New Jersey, US

- Township
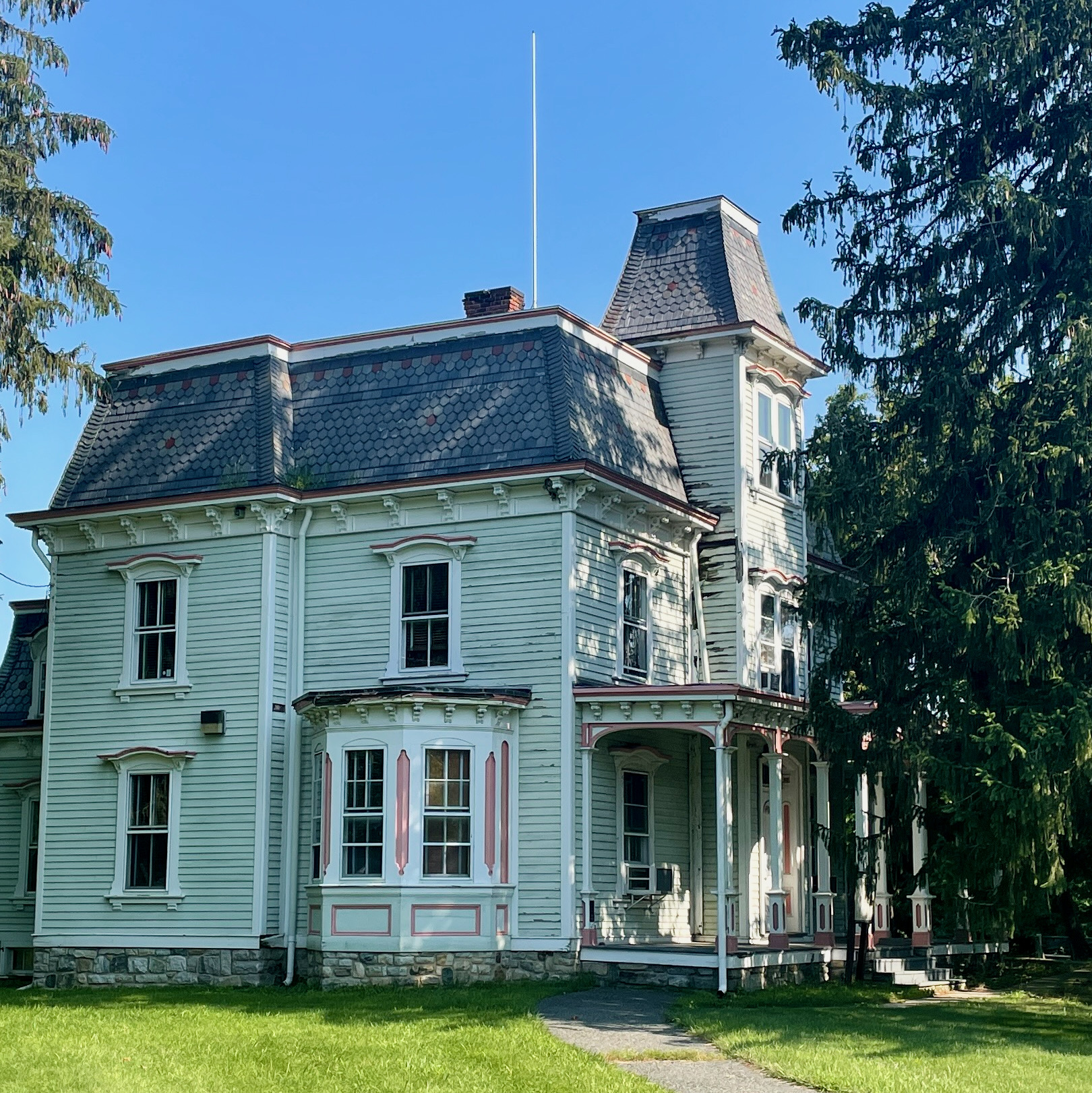
- The Slater House, built 1874

- Seal

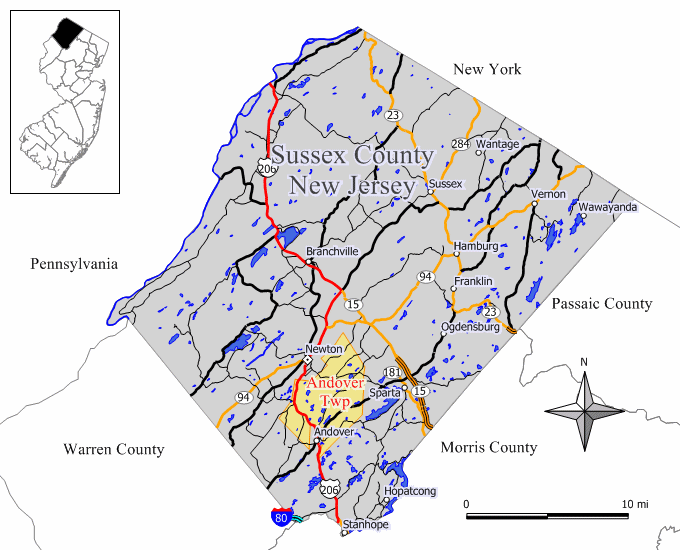
- Map of Andover Township in Sussex County. Inset: Location of Sussex County highlighted in the State of New Jersey.

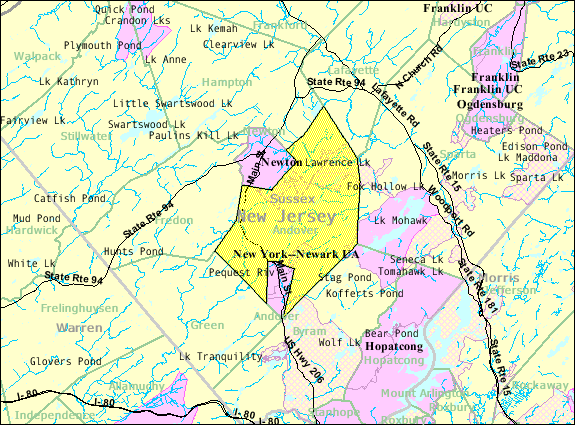
- Census Bureau map of Andover Township, New Jersey.

- Location in Sussex County Location in New Jersey Location in the United States
- Coordinates: 41.025516°N 74.726027°W
- Country: United States
- State: New Jersey
- County: Sussex
- Incorporated: April 11, 1864
- Named after: Andover, Hampshire, England

Government
  - Type: Township
  - Body: Township Committee
  - Mayor: Thomas D. Walsh Jr. (R, term ends December 31, 2026)
  - Administrator: Patricia L. Bussow
  - Municipal clerk: Patricia L. Bussow

Area
  - Total: 20.79 sq mi (53.85 km^{2})
  - Land: 20.05 sq mi (51.92 km^{2})
  - Water: 0.75 sq mi (1.93 km^{2}) 3.59%
  - Rank: 136th of 565 in state 12th of 24 in county
- Elevation: 600 ft (180 m)

Population (2020)
  - Total: 5,996
  - Estimate (2023): 5,635
  - Rank: 348th of 565 in state 8th of 24 in county
  - Density: 299.1/sq mi (115.5/km^{2})
  - Rank: 474th of 565 in state 13th of 24 in county
- Time zone: UTC−05:00 (Eastern (EST))
  - Summer (DST): UTC−04:00 (Eastern (EDT))
- ZIP Code: 07860 – Newton (as Andover Township does not have its own ZIP code)
- Area codes: 973 Exchange: 786
- FIPS code: 3403701360
- GNIS feature ID: 0882266
- Website: www.andovertwp.org

Andover Township is a township in Sussex County, in the U.S. state of New Jersey. As of the 2020 United States census, the township's population was 5,996, a decrease of 323 (−5.1%) from the 2010 census count of 6,319, which in turn reflected an increase of 286 (+4.7%) from the 6,033 counted in the 2000 census.

Andover was incorporated as a township by an act of the New Jersey Legislature on April 11, 1864, from portions of Newton Township, which was split up on that date and dissolved. Portions of the township were taken to form Fredon Township (February 24, 1904) and Andover borough (March 25, 1904). Portions of the township were ceded to Newton town in both 1869 and 1927.

The township was suggestively named after the existing village of Andover, whose name origin is not certain, though sources indicate that the name comes from Andover, Hampshire, England. In the years before World War II, Andover Township was home to Camp Nordland, a retreat and gathering place covering 204 acres (83 ha) owned and operated by the German American Bund, an American Nazi organization devoted to promoting a favorable view of Nazi Germany. Camp Nordland was shut down by the federal government after Germany declared war on the United States and sold at auction in 1944. The property eventually was acquired by Andover Township and is now called Hillside Park with a recreational hall and sports fields.

== Geography ==
According to the United States Census Bureau, the township had a total area of 20.79 square miles (53.85 km^{2}), including 20.05 square miles (51.92 km^{2}) of land and 0.75 square miles (1.93 km^{2}) of water (3.59%).

Unincorporated communities, localities and place names located partially or completely within the township include Brighton, County Road Camp, Davis Pond, Drakes Pond, Garders Lake, Iliffs Lake, Lake Aeroflex, Lake Iliff, Lake Lenape, Long Pond, Mulford, New Waywayanda Lake, Pinkneyville, Redings Pond, Springdale, Stickle Pond, Sussex Mills, Whitehall and Whites Pond.

The township borders the Sussex County municipalities of Andover, Byram Township, Fredon Township, Green Township, Hampton Township, Lafayette Township and Sparta Township.

== Demographics ==
Historical population
Census	Pop.	Note	%±
1870	1,126		—
1880	1,150		2.1%
1890	1,126		−2.1%
1900	987		−12.3%
1910	521	*	−47.2%
1920	473		−9.2%
1930	496		4.9%
1940	591		19.2%
1950	1,052		78.0%
1960	2,177		106.9%
1970	3,040		39.6%
1980	4,506		48.2%
1990	5,438		20.7%
2000	6,033		10.9%
2010	6,319		4.7%
2020	5,996		−5.1%
2023 (est.)	5,635		−6.0%
Population sources: 1870–1920; 1870 1880–1890 1890–1910; 1910–1930 1940–2000; 2000 2010 2020 * = Lost territory in previous decade.

=== 2010 census ===
The 2010 United States census counted 6,319 people, 2,070 households, and 1,590 families in the township. The population density was 316.6 per square mile (122.2/km^{2}). There were 2,181 housing units at an average density of 109.3 per square mile (42.2/km^{2}). The racial makeup was 91.64% (5,791) White, 3.37% (213) Black or African American, 0.17% (11) Native American, 2.60% (164) Asian, 0.00% (0) Pacific Islander, 0.73% (46) from other races, and 1.49% (94) from two or more races. Hispanic or Latino of any race were 5.14% (325) of the population.

Of the 2,070 households, 34.9% had children under the age of 18; 64.8% were married couples living together; 7.9% had a female householder with no husband present and 23.2% were non-families. Of all households, 19.2% were made up of individuals and 6.0% had someone living alone who was 65 years of age or older. The average household size was 2.70 and the average family size was 3.10.

22.1% of the population were under the age of 18, 5.5% from 18 to 24, 22.2% from 25 to 44, 34.2% from 45 to 64, and 16.0% who were 65 years of age or older. The median age was 45.1 years. For every 100 females, the population had 99.8 males. For every 100 females ages 18 and older there were 95.6 males.

The Census Bureau's 2006–2010 American Community Survey showed that (in 2010 inflation-adjusted dollars) median household income was $95,313 (with a margin of error of +/− $10,064) and the median family income was $105,554 (+/− $13,995). Males had a median income of $72,066 (+/− $10,198) versus $47,750 (+/− $8,020) for females. The per capita income for the borough was $38,284 (+/− $4,082). About 2.3% of families and 2.9% of the population were below the poverty line, including 1.0% of those under age 18 and none of those age 65 or over.

=== 2000 census ===
As of the 2000 United States census there were 6,033 people, 1,889 households, and 1,499 families residing in the township. The population density was 298.9 inhabitants per square mile (115.4/km^{2}). There were 1,968 housing units at an average density of 97.5 per square mile (37.6/km^{2}). The racial makeup of the township was 94.45% White, 1.86% African American, 0.08% Native American, 2.30% Asian, 0.03% Pacific Islander, 0.60% from other races, and 0.68% from two or more races. Hispanic or Latino of any race were 2.25% of the population.

There were 1,889 households, out of which 39.8% had children under the age of 18 living with them, 67.9% were married couples living together, 8.0% had a female householder with no husband present, and 20.6% were non-families. 16.1% of all households were made up of individuals, and 5.0% had someone living alone who was 65 years of age or older. The average household size was 2.80 and the average family size was 3.16.

In the township the population was spread out, with 25.0% under the age of 18, 4.6% from 18 to 24, 28.9% from 25 to 44, 25.7% from 45 to 64, and 15.7% who were 65 years of age or older. The median age was 40 years. For every 100 females, there were 91.9 males. For every 100 females age 18 and over, there were 87.2 males.

The median income for a household in the township was $75,748, and the median income for a family was $78,439. Males had a median income of $57,098 versus $36,268 for females. The per capita income for the township was $29,180. About 1.3% of families and 3.5% of the population were below the poverty line, including 1.9% of those under age 18 and 5.3% of those age 65 or over.

== Government ==
=== Local government ===
Andover Township is governed under the Township form of New Jersey municipal government, one of 141 municipalities (of the 564) statewide that use this form, the second-most commonly used form of government in the state. The Township Committee is comprised of five members, who are elected directly by the voters at-large in partisan elections to serve three-year terms of office on a staggered basis, with either one or two seats coming up for election each year as part of the November general election in a three-year cycle. At an annual reorganization held in January, the council selects a mayor and a deputy mayor from among its members.

As of 2024, members of the Andover Township Committee are Mayor Thomas D. Walsh Jr. (R, term on township committee ends December 31, 2026; term as mayor ends 2025), Deputy Mayor Eric Karr (R, term on committee and as deputy mayor ends 2024), Ellsworth E. Bensley Jr. (R, 2025), Michael Lensak (R, 2026) and Janis L. McGovern (R, 2024).

=== Federal, state and county representation ===
Andover Township is located in the 5th Congressional district and is part of New Jersey's 24th state legislative district.

For the 119th United States Congress, New Jersey's 5th congressional district is represented by Josh Gottheimer (D, Wyckoff). New Jersey is represented in the United States Senate by Democrats Cory Booker (Newark, term ends 2027) and Andy Kim (Moorestown, term ends 2031).

For the 2026–2027 session, the 24th legislative district of the New Jersey Legislature is represented in the State Senate by Parker Space (R, Wantage Township) and in the General Assembly by Dawn Fantasia (R, Franklin) and Mike Inganamort (R, Chester Township).

Sussex County is governed by a Board of County Commissioners whose five members are elected at-large in partisan elections on a staggered basis, with either one or two seats coming up for election each year. At an annual reorganization meeting held in the beginning of January, the board selects a Commissioner Director and Deputy Director from among its members, with day-to-day supervision of the operation of the county delegated to a County Administrator. As of 2025, Sussex County's Commissioners are Director Jill Space (R, Wantage Township, 2025), Deputy Director Chris Carney (R, Frankford Township, 2027), Jack DeGroot (R, Sussex, 2026), William Hayden (I, Branchville, 2025) and Alan Henderson (R, Lafayette Township, 2027).

Constitutional officers elected on a countywide basis are Clerk Jeffrey M. Parrott (R, Wantage Township, 2026), Sheriff Michael F. Strada (R, Hampton Township, 2025) and Surrogate Gary R. Chiusano (R, Frankford Township, 2028).

=== Politics ===
As of March 2011, there were a total of 3,979 registered voters in Andover Township, of which 606 (15.2% vs. 16.5% countywide) were registered as Democrats, 1,813 (45.6% vs. 39.3%) were registered as Republicans and 1,552 (39.0% vs. 44.1%) were registered as Unaffiliated. There were 8 voters registered as Libertarians or Greens. Among the township's 2010 Census population, 63.0% (vs. 65.8% in Sussex County) were registered to vote, including 80.8% of those ages 18 and over (vs. 86.5% countywide).

In the 2012 presidential election, Republican Mitt Romney received 1,703 votes (60.7% vs. 59.4% countywide), ahead of Democrat Barack Obama with 1,034 votes (36.8% vs. 38.2%) and other candidates with 62 votes (2.2% vs. 2.1%), among the 2,807 ballots cast by the township's 4,074 registered voters, for a turnout of 68.9% (vs. 68.3% in Sussex County). In the 2008 presidential election, Republican John McCain received 1,772 votes (59.0% vs. 59.2% countywide), ahead of Democrat Barack Obama with 1,173 votes (39.1% vs. 38.7%) and other candidates with 37 votes (1.2% vs. 1.5%), among the 3,002 ballots cast by the township's 3,948 registered voters, for a turnout of 76.0% (vs. 76.9% in Sussex County). In the 2004 presidential election, Republican George W. Bush received 1,799 votes (64.0% vs. 63.9% countywide), ahead of Democrat John Kerry with 966 votes (34.4% vs. 34.4%) and other candidates with 30 votes (1.1% vs. 1.3%), among the 2,811 ballots cast by the township's 3,566 registered voters, for a turnout of 78.8% (vs. 77.7% in the whole county).

Gubernatorial election results for Andover Township
Year	Republican		Democratic		Third party(ies)	
Year	No.	%	No.	%	No.	%
2025	1,494	58.82%	1,027	40.43%	19	0.75%
2021	1,464	65.39%	749	33.45%	26	1.16%
2017	989	59.47%	608	36.56%	66	3.97%
2013	1,212	71.17%	427	25.07%	64	3.76%
2009	1,271	67.97%	482	25.78%	117	6.26%
2005	1,022	62.70%	525	32.21%	83	5.09%

United States presidential election results for Andover Township 2024 2020 2016 2012 2008 2004
Year	Republican		Democratic		Third party(ies)	
Year	No.	%	No.	%	No.	%
2024	2,019	60.76%	1,244	37.44%	60	1.81%
2020	2,061	58.04%	1,424	40.10%	66	1.86%
2016	1,876	62.43%	998	33.21%	131	4.36%
2012	1,703	60.84%	1,034	36.94%	62	2.22%
2008	1,772	59.42%	1,173	39.34%	37	1.24%
2004	1,799	64.36%	966	34.56%	30	1.07%

In the 2013 gubernatorial election, Republican Chris Christie received 71.2% of the vote (1,212 cast), ahead of Democrat Barbara Buono with 25.1% (427 votes), and other candidates with 3.8% (64 votes), among the 1,718 ballots cast by the township's 4,121 registered voters (15 ballots were spoiled), for a turnout of 41.7%. In the 2009 gubernatorial election, Republican Chris Christie received 1,271 votes (64.4% vs. 63.3% countywide), ahead of Democrat Jon Corzine with 482 votes (24.4% vs. 25.7%), Independent Chris Daggett with 195 votes (9.9% vs. 9.1%) and other candidates with 22 votes (1.1% vs. 1.3%), among the 1,974 ballots cast by the township's 3,882 registered voters, yielding a 50.9% turnout (vs. 52.3% in the county).

United States Senate election results for Andover Township1
Year	Republican		Democratic		Third party(ies)	
Year	No.	%	No.	%	No.	%
2024	1,911	58.87%	1,223	37.68%	112	3.45%
2018	1,565	62.28%	818	32.55%	130	5.17%
2012	1,614	59.34%	998	36.69%	108	3.97%
2006	1,091	63.65%	570	33.26%	53	3.09%

United States Senate election results for Andover Township2
Year	Republican		Democratic		Third party(ies)	
Year	No.	%	No.	%	No.	%
2020	1,991	56.58%	1,402	39.84%	126	3.58%
2014	942	61.49%	558	36.42%	32	2.09%
2013	736	66.97%	353	32.12%	10	0.91%
2008	1,722	59.40%	1,057	36.46%	120	4.14%

== Education ==
Public school students in pre-kindergarten through eighth grade attend the Andover Regional School District, together with students from Andover Borough. As of the 2021–22 school year, the district, comprised of two schools, had an enrollment of 416 students and 52.2 classroom teachers (on an FTE basis), for a student–teacher ratio of 8.0:1. Schools in the district (with 2021–22 enrollment data from the National Center for Education Statistics) are Florence M. Burd Elementary School with 218 students in grades PreK-4 and Long Pond Middle School with 195 students in grades 5-8. The district's board of education is comprised of nine members who set policy and oversee the fiscal and educational operation of the district through its administration, with Andover Township assigned eight of the nine seats, based on the population of the two constituent municipalities.

Public school students in ninth through twelfth grades attend Newton High School in Newton, together with students from Andover Township and Green Township, as part of a sending/receiving relationship with the Newton Public School District. As of the 2021–22 school year, the high school had an enrollment of 710 students and 60.0 classroom teachers (on an FTE basis), for a student–teacher ratio of 11.8:1.

== Transportation ==
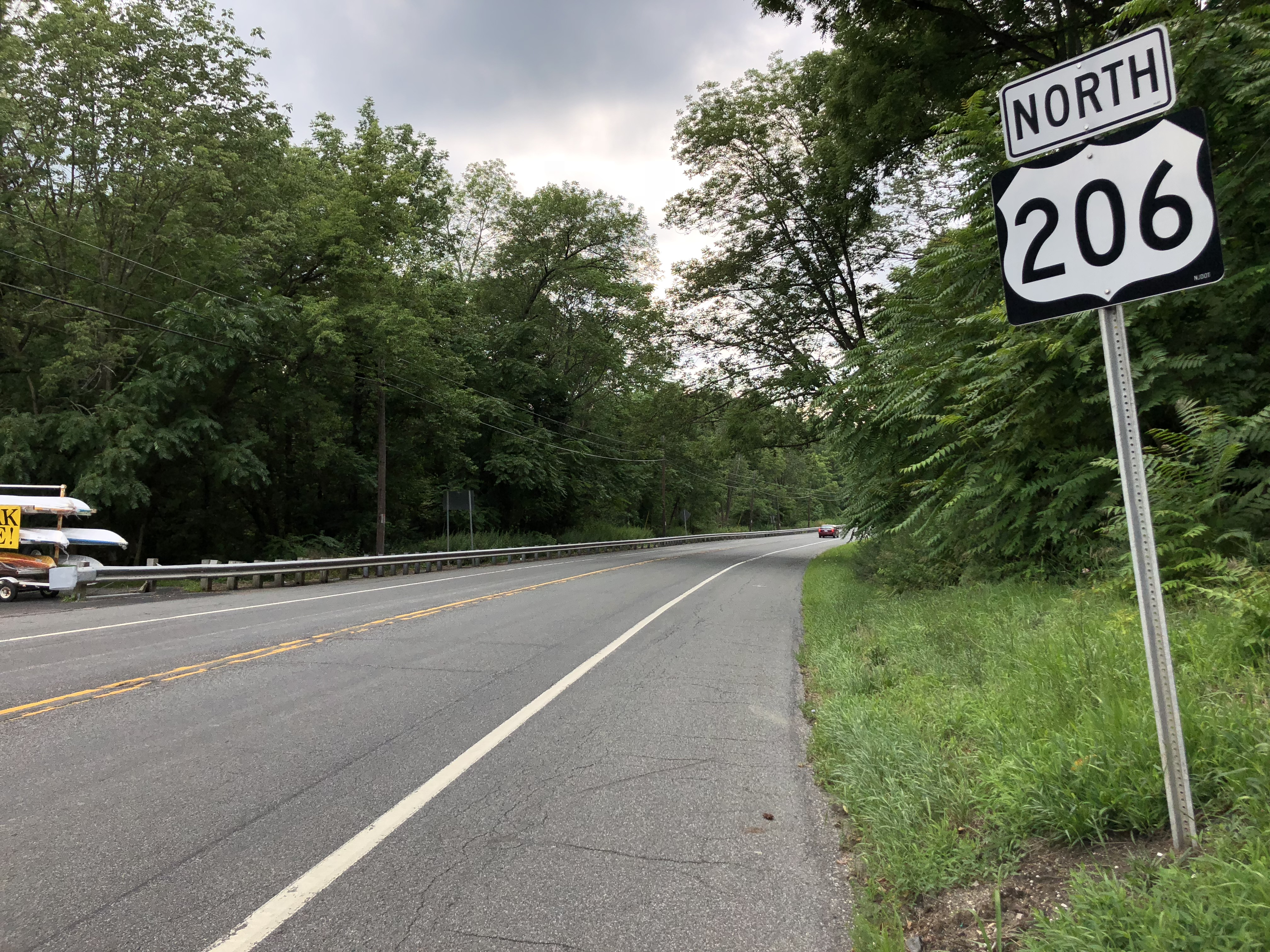
U.S. Route 206 northbound in Andover Township

As of May 2010, the township had a total of 73.42 miles (118.16 km) of roadways, of which 49.13 miles (79.07 km) were maintained by the municipality, 20.79 miles (33.46 km) by Sussex County and 3.50 miles (5.63 km) by the New Jersey Department of Transportation.

U.S. Route 206 is the main highway serving Andover Township. County Route 517 also passes through the township.

NJ Transit is working on the Lackawanna Cut-Off Restoration Project through the southern part of the township. Service is anticipated to begin in 2026, with plans for an Andover station included as part of the restored passenger service.

== Notable people ==
People who were born in, residents of, or otherwise closely associated with Andover Township include:

- Gail Phoebus (born 1950), member of the New Jersey General Assembly, who previously served on the Andover Township Committee and as a Sussex County Freeholder
