= Tranquility, New Jersey =

Populated place in Sussex County, New Jersey, US

- Unincorporated community
- Tranquility's location in Sussex County (Inset: Sussex County in New Jersey) Tranquility, New Jersey (New Jersey) Tranquility, New Jersey (the United States)
- Coordinates: 40°57′22″N 74°48′31″W
- Country: United States
- State: New Jersey
- County: Sussex
- Township: Green
- Elevation: 551 ft (168 m)
- Time zone: UTC−05:00 (Eastern (EST))
  - Summer (DST): UTC−04:00 (EDT)
- ZIP Code: 07879
- Area code: 908
- GNIS feature ID: 881235

Tranquility is an unincorporated community in Green Township in Sussex County, in the U.S. state of New Jersey. The area is served by the United States Postal Service as ZIP Code 07879.
