= Newton Public School District =

School district in Sussex County, New Jersey, US

Address
- 57 Trinity Street Newton, Sussex County, New Jersey, 07860; United States
- Coordinates: 41.057229°N 74.748882°W

District information
- Grades: PreK-12
- Superintendent: Joseph S. Piccirillo
- Business administrator: James Sekelsky
- Schools: 3

Students and staff
- Enrollment: 1,586 (as of 2021–22)
- Faculty: 137.0 FTEs
- Student–teacher ratio: 11.6:1

Other information
- District Factor Group: CD
- Website: www.newtonnj.org
Ind.	Per pupil	District spending	Rank (*)	K-12 average	%± vs. average
1A	Total Spending	$18,922	31	$18,891	0.2%
1	Budgetary Cost	15,168	35	14,783	2.6%
2	Classroom Instruction	8,846	35	8,763	0.9%
6	Support Services	2,028	25	2,392	−15.2%
8	Administrative Cost	1,963	44	1,485	32.2%
10	Operations & Maintenance	1,623	28	1,783	−9.0%
13	Extracurricular Activities	672	46	268	150.7%
16	Median Teacher Salary	64,651	35	64,043
Data from NJDoE 2014 Taxpayers' Guide to Education Spending. *Of K-12 districts with up to 1,800 students. Lowest spending=1; Highest=49

The Newton Public School District is a comprehensive community public school district serving students in pre-kindergarten through twelfth grade from Newton, in Sussex County, in the U.S. state of New Jersey. The district's enrollment includes high school students from Andover Borough and Andover and Green townships, who attend the high school as part of sending/receiving relationships.

As of the 2021–22 school year, the district, comprising three schools, had an enrollment of 1,586 students and 137.0 classroom teachers (on an FTE basis), for a student–teacher ratio of 11.6:1.

The district is classified by the New Jersey Department of Education as being in District Factor Group "CD", the sixth-highest of eight groupings. District Factor Groups organize districts statewide to allow comparison by common socioeconomic characteristics of the local districts. From lowest socioeconomic status to highest, the categories are A, B, CD, DE, FG, GH, I and J. Despite its District Factor Group, Newton has been considered the top school district in Sussex County, registering the highest test scores in the county.

== Schools ==
Schools in the district (with 2021–22 enrollment data from the National Center for Education Statistics) are:

Elementary school

- Merriam Avenue School with 451 students in grades PreK-4
  - Kevin Stanton, principal

Middle school

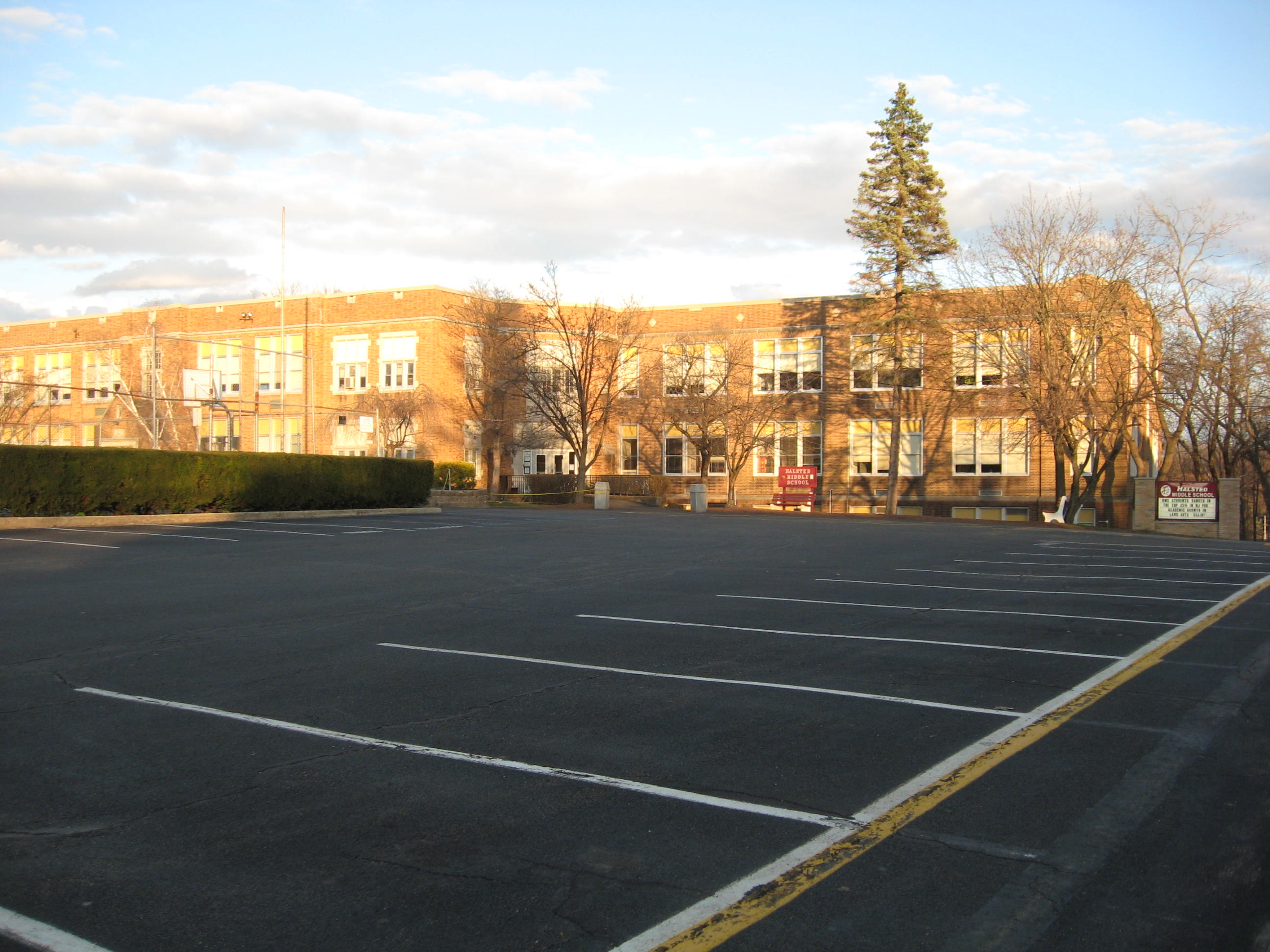
Halsted Middle School

- Halsted Middle School with 331 students in grades 5–8
  - Samantha Castro, principal

High school

- Newton High School with 710 students in grades 9–12
  - Jeffrey Waldron, principal

== Administration ==
Core members of the district's administration are:

- Joseph S. Piccirillo, superintendent
- James Sekelsky, business administrator and board secretary

== Board of education ==
The district's board of education, comprised of nine members, sets policy and oversees the fiscal and educational operation of the district through its administration. As a Type II school district, the board's trustees are elected directly by voters to serve three-year terms of office on a staggered basis, with three seats up for election each year held (since 2012) as part of the November general election. The board appoints a superintendent to oversee the district's day-to-day operations and a business administrator to supervise the business functions of the district. In addition to the nine elected members, the board includes one appointed representative from Andover Township and one from Green Township.
