= Green Township, New Jersey =

Township in Sussex County, New Jersey, US

- Township
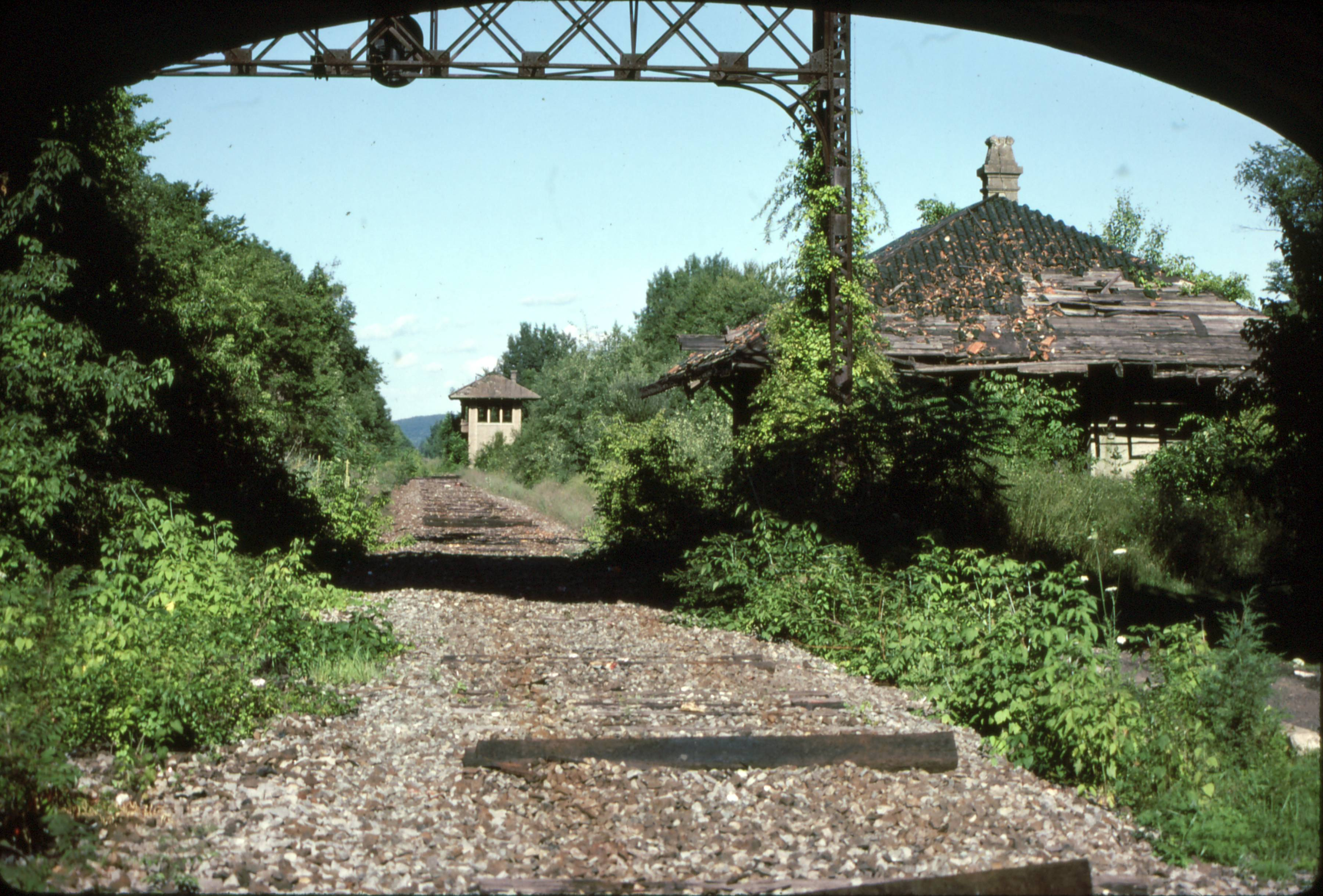
- Greendell station

- Seal

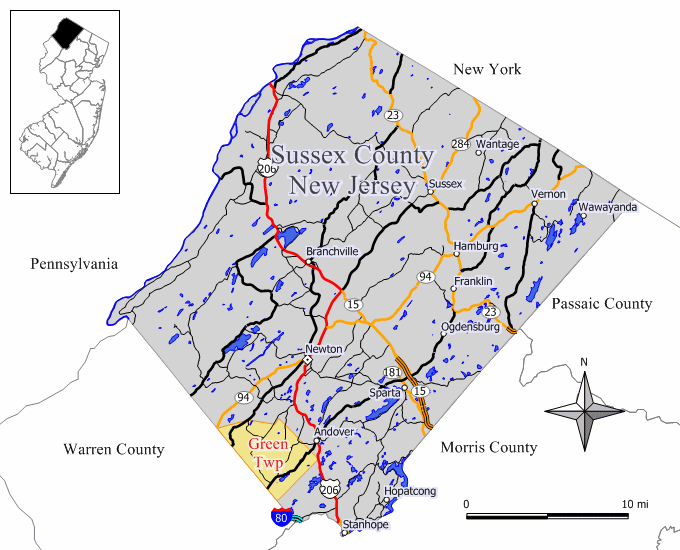
- Map of Green Township in Sussex County. Inset: Location of Sussex County highlighted in the State of New Jersey.

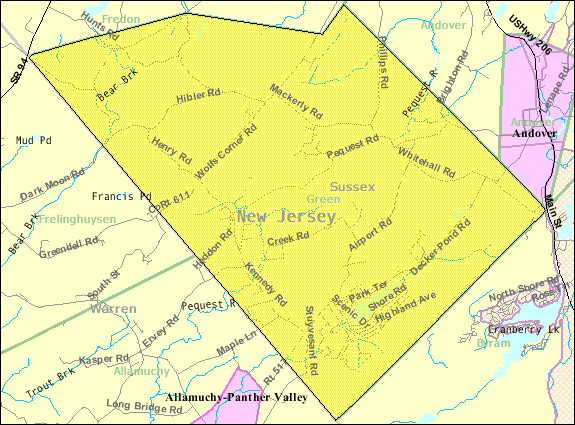
- Census Bureau map of Green Township, New Jersey

- Location in Sussex County Location in New Jersey Location in the United States
- Coordinates: 40.974073°N 74.802584°W
- Country: United States
- State: New Jersey
- County: Sussex
- Incorporated: December 27, 1824
- Named for: Ephraim Green

Government
  - Type: Township
  - Body: Township Committee
  - Mayor: Virginia "Ginnie" Raffay (R, term ends December 31, 2026)
  - Administrator: Mark Zschack
  - Municipal clerk: Mark Zschack

Area
  - Total: 16.30 sq mi (42.21 km^{2})
  - Land: 16.03 sq mi (41.53 km^{2})
  - Water: 0.27 sq mi (0.69 km^{2}) 1.63%
  - Rank: 168th of 565 in state 15th of 24 in county
- Elevation: 597 ft (182 m)

Population (2020)
  - Total: 3,627
  - Estimate (2023): 3,683
  - Rank: 425th of 565 in state 14th of 24 in county
  - Density: 226.2/sq mi (87.3/km^{2})
  - Rank: 496th of 565 in state 15th of 24 in county
- Time zone: UTC−05:00 (Eastern (EST))
  - Summer (DST): UTC−04:00 (Eastern (EDT))
- ZIP Code: 07821 – Andover, New Jersey
- Area code: 908
- FIPS code: 3403727420
- GNIS feature ID: 0882264
- Website: www.greentwp.com

Green Township is a township in Sussex County, in the U.S. state of New Jersey. As of the 2020 United States census, the township's population was 3,627, an increase of 26 (+0.7%) from the 2010 census count of 3,601, which in turn reflected increase of 381 (+11.8%) from the 3,220 counted in the 2000 census.

== History ==
On November 20, 1824, the southern portion of Sussex County was set off to create Warren County. The northern portions of both Hardwick and Independence townships, remained in Sussex County and were incorporated as Green Township by an act of the New Jersey Legislature on December 27, 1824.

In 1829, part of Green Township were transferred to Byram Township, and in 1853 Green Township was expanded to include a section of the old Newtown Township. On February 24, 1904, Fredon Township was incorporated from a portion of the township. In 1881, the area was listed as 19.65 square miles (50.9 km^{2}); and today Green encompasses 16.5 square miles (43 km^{2}). The township was named after Ephraim Green, who settled near Greendell in 1770. Many sections of Green retain their own unique identity, such as Tranquility, Huntsville, Greendell and Yellow Frame.

Tranquility was originally known as Kennedytown, named for Amos Kennedy who settled here. When the location for the Tranquility Methodist Church was being chosen, a disagreement arose over erecting it in Allamuchy Township or Kennedytown. A compromise was affected, with the church being erected halfway between the two points. To memorialize the agreement, the church was named Tranquility. Later, Kennedytown took the church's name as its own.

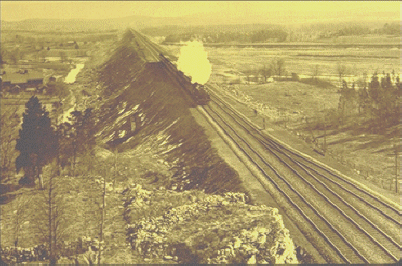
The westbound Lackawanna Limited coming off the Pequest Fill on the Lackawanna Cut-off in Tranquility, about 1-mile (1.6 km) east of the station in Greendell. This 1912 photo was the basis for a Phoebe Snow poster advertising how the Cut-Off cut off 11 miles (18 km) from the trip to Buffalo, New York. The so-called "borrow pits" that provided fill for the Pequest Fill can be seen to the right. The original Tranquility schoolhouse stood not far from this location, but was torn down to make way for the Pequest Fill. The Lackawanna Railroad paid for a new schoolhouse.

In 1911, the Lackawanna Cut-off rail line opened through Green Township, with a stop at Greendell station. The Cut-Off was part of the Delaware, Lackawanna and Western Railroad's mainline from Hoboken to Buffalo. The line was abandoned in 1980 and the tracks were removed four years later. New Jersey Transit is considering reactivating passenger service on the line extending to Scranton, Pennsylvania, with a proposed maintenance-of-way facility at Greendell that would incorporate the surviving station building.

In August 2006, a documentary titled The History of Green Township was produced by Kelsey Falkowski. The video includes historical landmarks, interviews with lifelong citizens of Green Township, and leads up to the contemporary view of the township. Copies can be obtained through the Green Township Historical Society.

== Geography ==
According to the United States Census Bureau, Green township had a total area of 16.30 square miles (42.21 km^{2}), including 16.03 square miles (41.53 km^{2}) of land and 0.27 square miles (0.69 km^{2}) of water (1.63%).

Unincorporated communities, localities and place names located partially or completely within the township include Brighton Lakes, Buckmire Pond, Greendell, Huntsburg, Huntsville, Lincoln, Tranquility, Whitehall and Yellow Frame.

Green Township borders the municipalities of Andover Borough, Andover Township, Byram Township and Fredon Township in Sussex County; and Allamuchy Township and Frelinghuysen Township in Warren County.

== Demographics ==
Historical population
Census	Pop.	Note	%±
1830	801		—
1840	777		−3.0%
1850	823		5.9%
1860	1,023		24.3%
1870	868		−15.2%
1880	727		−16.2%
1890	636		−12.5%
1900	627		−1.4%
1910	888	*	41.6%
1920	454		−48.9%
1930	539		18.7%
1940	540		0.2%
1950	596		10.4%
1960	854		43.3%
1970	1,343		57.3%
1980	2,450		82.4%
1990	2,709		10.6%
2000	3,220		18.9%
2010	3,601		11.8%
2020	3,627		0.7%
2023 (est.)	3,683		1.5%
Population sources: 1830–1920 1840 1850–1870; 1850 1870 1880–1890; 1890–1910 1910–1930; 1940–2000 2000; 2010 2020 * = Lost territory in previous decade.

=== 2010 census ===
The 2010 United States census counted 3,601 people, 1,181 households, and 997 families in the township. The population density was 225.3 per square mile (87.0/km^{2}). There were 1,251 housing units at an average density of 78.3 per square mile (30.2/km^{2}). The racial makeup was 94.78% (3,413) White, 1.25% (45) Black or African American, 0.03% (1) Native American, 1.72% (62) Asian, 0.00% (0) Pacific Islander, 0.78% (28) from other races, and 1.44% (52) from two or more races. Hispanic or Latino of any race were 4.80% (173) of the population.

Of the 1,181 households, 43.0% had children under the age of 18; 76.0% were married couples living together; 5.2% had a female householder with no husband present and 15.6% were non-families. Of all households, 11.2% were made up of individuals and 4.1% had someone living alone who was 65 years of age or older. The average household size was 3.04 and the average family size was 3.31.

28.4% of the population were under the age of 18, 6.3% from 18 to 24, 21.5% from 25 to 44, 33.0% from 45 to 64, and 10.8% who were 65 years of age or older. The median age was 41.9 years. For every 100 females, the population had 100.7 males. For every 100 females ages 18 and older there were 98.9 males.

The Census Bureau's 2006–2010 American Community Survey showed that (in 2010 inflation-adjusted dollars) median household income was $103,693 (with a margin of error of +/− $15,229) and the median family income was $113,971 (+/− $20,140). Males had a median income of $85,591 (+/− $9,018) versus $50,583 (+/− $7,305) for females. The per capita income for the borough was $37,546 (+/− $3,396). About 1.3% of families and 2.3% of the population were below the poverty line, including 1.8% of those under age 18 and none of those age 65 or over.

=== 2000 census ===
As of the 2000 United States census there were 3,220 people, 1,046 households, and 890 families residing in the township. The population density was 199.0 inhabitants per square mile (76.8/km^{2}). There were 1,069 housing units at an average density of 66.1 per square mile (25.5/km^{2}). The racial makeup of the township was 96.49% White, 0.93% African American, 0.03% Native American, 0.96% Asian, 0.28% from other races, and 1.30% from two or more races. Hispanic or Latino of any race were 3.20% of the population.

There were 1,046 households, out of which 45.5% had children under the age of 18 living with them, 78.9% were married couples living together, 3.8% had a female householder with no husband present, and 14.9% were non-families. 11.0% of all households were made up of individuals, and 3.3% had someone living alone who was 65 years of age or older. The average household size was 3.07 and the average family size was 3.34.

In the township the population was spread out, with 30.8% under the age of 18, 5.0% from 18 to 24, 31.7% from 25 to 44, 26.5% from 45 to 64, and 6.0% who were 65 years of age or older. The median age was 36 years. For every 100 females, there were 104.7 males. For every 100 females age 18 and over, there were 97.3 males.

The median income for a household in the township was $84,847, and the median income for a family was $89,788. Males had a median income of $61,576 versus $33,393 for females. The per capita income for the township was $34,127. About 0.9% of families and 1.6% of the population were below the poverty line, including 1.7% of those under age 18 and 4.5% of those age 65 or over.

== Government ==
=== Local government ===
Green Township is governed under the Township form of New Jersey municipal government, one of 141 municipalities (of the 564) statewide that use this form, the second-most commonly used form of government in the state. The Township Committee is comprised of five members, who are elected directly by the voters at-large in partisan elections to serve three-year terms of office on a staggered basis, with either one or two seats coming up for election each year as part of the November general election in a three-year cycle. At an annual reorganization meeting held during the first week of January, the Township Committee selects one of its members to serve as Mayor and another as Deputy Mayor.

As of 2024, members of the Green Township Committee are Mayor Margaret H. "Peg" Phillips (R, term on committee ends December 31, 2026; term as mayor ends 2024), Deputy Mayor Virginia "Ginny" Raffay (R, term on committee ends 2026; term as deputy mayor ends 2024), James DeYoung (R, 2024; elected to serve an unexpired term), Bader G. Qarmout (R, 2025) and Michael Rose (R, 2025).

The Township Committee chose James DeYoung in March 2022 from the list of candidates submitted by the Republican municipal committee to fill the seat expiring in December 2024 that became vacant following the death of Daniel Conkling the previous month.

In March 2016, the Township Committee selected Bader Qarmout from a list of three candidates nominated by the Republican municipal committee to fill the seat expiring in December 2016 that had been held by Jason Joseph Reinbold until his resignation; Qarmout served on an interim basis until the November 2016 general election, when he was selected to serve the balance of the term.

=== Federal, state, and county representation ===
Green Township is located in the 7th Congressional District and is part of New Jersey's 24th state legislative district.

For the 119th United States Congress, New Jersey's 7th congressional district is represented by Thomas Kean Jr. (R, Westfield). New Jersey is represented in the United States Senate by Democrats Cory Booker (Newark, term ends 2027) and Andy Kim (Moorestown, term ends 2031).

For the 2026–2027 session, the 24th legislative district of the New Jersey Legislature is represented in the State Senate by Parker Space (R, Wantage Township) and in the General Assembly by Dawn Fantasia (R, Franklin) and Mike Inganamort (R, Chester Township).

Sussex County is governed by a Board of County Commissioners whose five members are elected at-large in partisan elections on a staggered basis, with either one or two seats coming up for election each year. At an annual reorganization meeting held in the beginning of January, the board selects a Commissioner Director and Deputy Director from among its members, with day-to-day supervision of the operation of the county delegated to a County Administrator. As of 2025, Sussex County's Commissioners are Director Jill Space (R, Wantage Township, 2025), Deputy Director Chris Carney (R, Frankford Township, 2027), Jack DeGroot (R, Sussex, 2026), William Hayden (I, Branchville, 2025) and Alan Henderson (R, Lafayette Township, 2027).

Constitutional officers elected on a countywide basis are Clerk Jeffrey M. Parrott (R, Wantage Township, 2026), Sheriff Michael F. Strada (R, Hampton Township, 2025) and Surrogate Gary R. Chiusano (R, Frankford Township, 2028).

=== Politics ===
As of March 2011, there were a total of 2,449 registered voters in Green Township, of which 337 (13.8% vs. 16.5% countywide) were registered as Democrats, 1,015 (41.4% vs. 39.3%) were registered as Republicans and 1,096 (44.8% vs. 44.1%) were registered as Unaffiliated. There was one voter registered to another party. Among the township's 2010 Census population, 68.0% (vs. 65.8% in Sussex County) were registered to vote, including 94.9% of those ages 18 and over (vs. 86.5% countywide).

Gubernatorial election results for Green Township
Year	Republican		Democratic		Third party(ies)	
Year	No.	%	No.	%	No.	%
2025	1,102	65.28%	575	34.06%	11	0.65%
2021	1,084	73.10%	384	25.89%	15	1.01%
2017	737	66.64%	324	29.29%	45	4.07%
2013	802	77.94%	197	19.14%	30	2.92%
2009	925	69.86%	257	19.41%	142	10.73%
2005	710	65.92%	304	28.23%	63	5.85%

In the 2012 presidential election, Republican Mitt Romney received 1,206 votes (68.4% vs. 59.4% countywide), ahead of Democrat Barack Obama with 525 votes (29.8% vs. 38.2%) and other candidates with 28 votes (1.6% vs. 2.1%), among the 1,762 ballots cast by the township's 2,507 registered voters, for a turnout of 70.3% (vs. 68.3% in Sussex County). In the 2008 presidential election, Republican John McCain received 1,271 votes (66.0% vs. 59.2% countywide), ahead of Democrat Barack Obama with 629 votes (32.7% vs. 38.7%) and other candidates with 19 votes (1.0% vs. 1.5%), among the 1,925 ballots cast by the township's 2,417 registered voters, for a turnout of 79.6% (vs. 76.9% in Sussex County). In the 2004 presidential election, Republican George W. Bush received 1,270 votes (70.4% vs. 63.9% countywide), ahead of Democrat John Kerry with 515 votes (28.5% vs. 34.4%) and other candidates with 15 votes (0.8% vs. 1.3%), among the 1,805 ballots cast by the township's 2,230 registered voters, for a turnout of 80.9% (vs. 77.7% in the whole county).

United States presidential election results for Green Township 2024 2020 2016 2012 2008 2004
Year	Republican		Democratic		Third party(ies)	
Year	No.	%	No.	%	No.	%
2024	1,498	66.73%	716	31.89%	31	1.38%
2020	1,476	63.02%	823	35.14%	43	1.84%
2016	1,331	67.67%	550	27.96%	86	4.37%
2012	1,206	68.56%	525	29.85%	28	1.59%
2008	1,271	66.23%	629	32.78%	19	0.99%
2004	1,270	70.56%	515	28.61%	15	0.83%

In the 2013 gubernatorial election, Republican Chris Christie received 77.9% of the vote (802 cast), ahead of Democrat Barbara Buono with 19.1% (197 votes), and other candidates with 2.9% (30 votes), among the 1,045 ballots cast by the township's 2,576 registered voters (16 ballots were spoiled), for a turnout of 40.6%. In the 2009 gubernatorial election, Republican Chris Christie received 925 votes (70.1% vs. 63.3% countywide), ahead of Democrat Jon Corzine with 257 votes (19.5% vs. 25.7%), Independent Chris Daggett with 116 votes (8.8% vs. 9.1%) and other candidates with 16 votes (1.2% vs. 1.3%), among the 1,320 ballots cast by the township's 2,404 registered voters, yielding a 54.9% turnout (vs. 52.3% in the county).

United States Senate election results for Green Township1
Year	Republican		Democratic		Third party(ies)	
Year	No.	%	No.	%	No.	%
2024	1,425	64.95%	706	32.18%	63	2.87%
2018	1,139	67.88%	451	26.88%	88	5.24%
2012	1,139	66.41%	513	29.91%	63	3.67%
2006	825	70.57%	306	26.18%	38	3.25%

United States Senate election results for Green Township2
Year	Republican		Democratic		Third party(ies)	
Year	No.	%	No.	%	No.	%
2020	1,415	61.60%	817	35.57%	65	2.83%
2014	663	69.13%	268	27.95%	28	2.92%
2013	514	69.93%	220	29.93%	1	0.14%
2008	1,205	65.28%	571	30.93%	70	3.79%

== Education ==
Students in public school for kindergarten through eighth grade attend the Green Township School District at Green Hills School. As of the 2023–24 school year, the district, comprised of one school, had an enrollment of 401 students and 42.7 classroom teachers (on an FTE basis), for a student–teacher ratio of 9.4:1.

Public school students in ninth through twelfth grades attend Newton High School in Newton, together with students from Andover Borough and Andover Township, as part of a sending/receiving relationship with the Newton Public School District. As of the 2023–24 school year, the high school had an enrollment of 723 students and 60.0 classroom teachers (on an FTE basis), for a student–teacher ratio of 12.1:1.

== Transportation ==
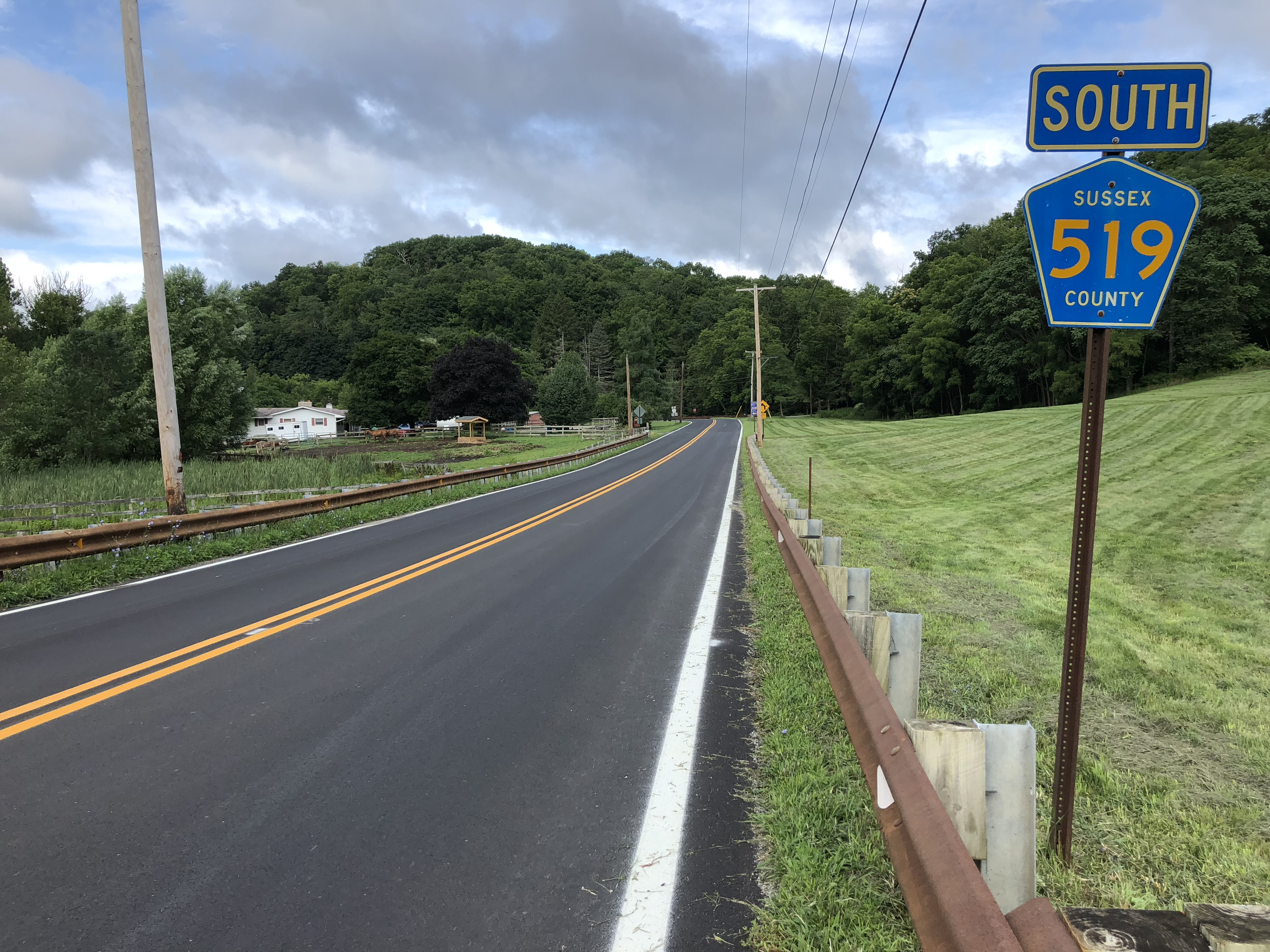
County Route 519 southbound in Green Township

As of May 2010, the township had a total of 49.28 miles (79.31 km) of roadways, of which 33.44 miles (53.82 km) were maintained by the municipality and 15.84 miles (25.49 km) by Sussex County.

No Interstate, U.S. or state highways directly serve Green Township. The most prominent roadways are county routes, including County Route 517 and County Route 519.

== Notable people ==
People who were born in, residents of, or otherwise closely associated with Green Township include:

- Stephen Bienko, coach and athlete, who was the largest franchise owner of the College Hunks Hauling Junk brand
- Lewis Morris Rutherfurd (1816–1892), lawyer and astronomer, who was a pioneering astrophotographer
- Lucy Page Mercer Rutherfurd (1891–1948), interred in Green Township, she is considered by historians to have been a mistress of United States President Franklin Delano Roosevelt and was with him on the day he died in 1945
