= Andover, New Jersey =

Borough in Sussex County, New Jersey, US

- Borough
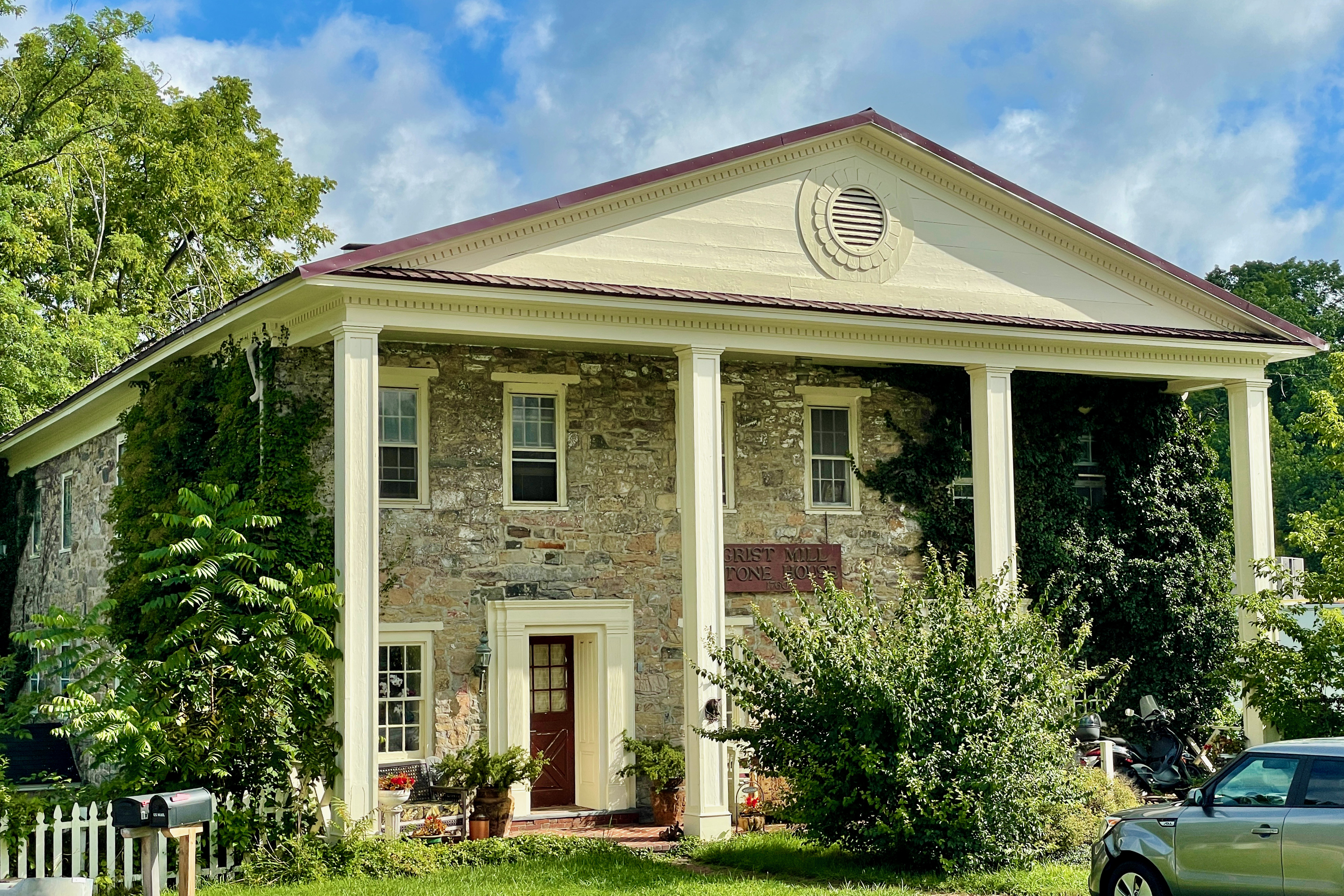
- Grist Mill Stone House, built 1760

- Map of Andover Borough in Sussex County. Inset: Location of Sussex County in New Jersey.

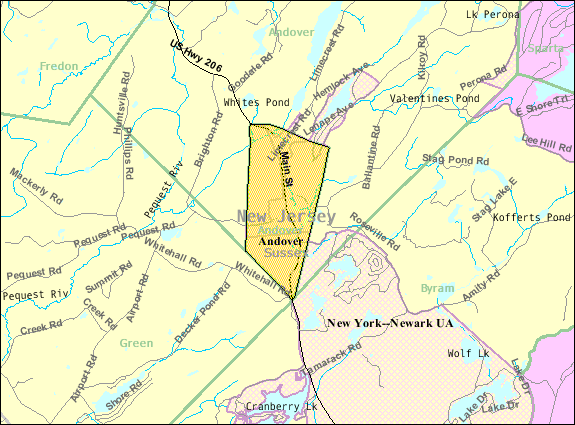
- Census Bureau map of Andover, New Jersey.

- Location in Sussex County Location in New Jersey Location in the United States
- Coordinates: 40.985743°N 74.743701°W
- Country: United States
- State: New Jersey
- County: Sussex
- Incorporated: March 25, 1904
- Named after: Andover, Hampshire, England

Government
  - Type: Borough
  - Body: Borough Council
  - Mayor: John A. Morgan (R, term ends December 31, 2027)
  - Municipal clerk: Beth Brothman

Area
  - Total: 1.36 sq mi (3.53 km^{2})
  - Land: 1.35 sq mi (3.49 km^{2})
  - Water: 0.015 sq mi (0.04 km^{2}) 1.18%
  - Rank: 464th of 565 in state 21st of 24 in county
- Elevation: 646 ft (197 m)

Population (2020)
  - Total: 595
  - Estimate (2023): 603
  - Rank: 549th of 565 in state 23rd of 24 in county
  - Density: 441.4/sq mi (170.4/km^{2})
  - Rank: 449th of 565 in state 10th of 24 in county
- Time zone: UTC−05:00 (Eastern (EST))
  - Summer (DST): UTC−04:00 (Eastern (EDT))
- ZIP Code: 07821
- Area codes: 973 exchange: 786
- FIPS code: 3403701330
- GNIS feature ID: 885140
- Website: www.andoverboroughnj.org

Andover is a borough in Sussex County, in the U.S. state of New Jersey. As of the 2020 United States census, the borough's population was 595, a decrease of 11 (−1.8%) from the 2010 census count of 606, which in turn reflected a decline of 52 (−7.9%) from the 658 counted in the 2000 census.

Andover was incorporated as a borough by an act of the New Jersey Legislature on March 25, 1904, from portions of Andover Township. The borough was named for Andover Township, which was in turn named for Andover, Hampshire, England.

== Geography ==
According to the United States Census Bureau, the borough had a total area of 1.36 square miles (3.53 km^{2}), including 1.35 square miles (3.49 km^{2}) of land and 0.02 square miles (0.04 km^{2}) of water (1.18%).

The borough borders the Sussex County municipalities of Andover Township, Byram Township and Green Township.

== Climate ==
Climate data for Andover, New Jersey, 1991–2020 normals, extremes 1998–present
Month	Jan	Feb	Mar	Apr	May	Jun	Jul	Aug	Sep	Oct	Nov	Dec	Year
Record high °F (°C)	69 (21)	77 (25)	79 (26)	92 (33)	95 (35)	96 (36)	101 (38)	99 (37)	93 (34)	92 (33)	79 (26)	73 (23)	101 (38)
Mean maximum °F (°C)	59.0 (15.0)	59.5 (15.3)	68.5 (20.3)	81.9 (27.7)	88.3 (31.3)	90.3 (32.4)	94.1 (34.5)	90.2 (32.3)	88.5 (31.4)	80.3 (26.8)	70.4 (21.3)	62.4 (16.9)	95.1 (35.1)
Mean daily maximum °F (°C)	35.9 (2.2)	39.2 (4.0)	47.8 (8.8)	60.8 (16.0)	71.0 (21.7)	79.1 (26.2)	83.6 (28.7)	81.5 (27.5)	74.4 (23.6)	62.9 (17.2)	51.6 (10.9)	40.8 (4.9)	60.7 (16.0)
Daily mean °F (°C)	27.4 (−2.6)	29.4 (−1.4)	37.8 (3.2)	49.5 (9.7)	59.5 (15.3)	68.1 (20.1)	72.7 (22.6)	70.8 (21.6)	63.4 (17.4)	52.3 (11.3)	42.0 (5.6)	32.8 (0.4)	50.5 (10.3)
Mean daily minimum °F (°C)	18.9 (−7.3)	19.6 (−6.9)	27.9 (−2.3)	38.2 (3.4)	48.0 (8.9)	57.1 (13.9)	61.8 (16.6)	60.1 (15.6)	52.4 (11.3)	41.7 (5.4)	32.4 (0.2)	24.8 (−4.0)	40.2 (4.6)
Mean minimum °F (°C)	0.7 (−17.4)	2.4 (−16.4)	12.9 (−10.6)	25.8 (−3.4)	34.8 (1.6)	44.8 (7.1)	52.9 (11.6)	50.3 (10.2)	41.0 (5.0)	27.7 (−2.4)	19.4 (−7.0)	11.4 (−11.4)	−2.0 (−18.9)
Record low °F (°C)	−15 (−26)	−14 (−26)	−8 (−22)	20 (−7)	30 (−1)	38 (3)	46 (8)	45 (7)	34 (1)	23 (−5)	8 (−13)	−2 (−19)	−15 (−26)
Average precipitation inches (mm)	3.27 (83)	2.83 (72)	4.07 (103)	3.78 (96)	3.83 (97)	4.54 (115)	5.06 (129)	4.85 (123)	4.32 (110)	4.64 (118)	3.43 (87)	4.18 (106)	48.8 (1,239)
Average precipitation days (≥ 0.01 in)	12.2	11.3	11.4	11.9	13.4	13.6	12.9	11.8	11.1	11.4	10.4	12.3	143.7
Source 1: NOAA
Source 2: National Weather Service (mean maxima/minima 2006–2020)

== Demographics ==
Historical population
Census	Pop.	Note	%±
1910	884		—
1920	417		−52.8%
1930	479		14.9%
1940	512		6.9%
1950	560		9.4%
1960	734		31.1%
1970	813		10.8%
1980	892		9.7%
1990	700		−21.5%
2000	658		−6.0%
2010	606		−7.9%
2020	595		−1.8%
2023 (est.)	603	▲	1.3%
Population sources: 1910–1920; 1910 1910–1930; 1940–2000 2000; 2010 2020

=== 2010 census ===
The 2010 United States census counted 606 people, 241 households, and 164 families in the borough. The population density was 417.3 per square mile (161.1/km^{2}). There were 263 housing units at an average density of 181.1 per square mile (69.9/km^{2}). The racial makeup was 91.75% (556) White, 1.16% (7) Black or African American, 0.33% (2) Native American, 2.15% (13) Asian, 0.00% (0) Pacific Islander, 2.64% (16) from other races, and 1.98% (12) from two or more races. Hispanic or Latino of any race were 7.59% (46) of the population.

Of the 241 households, 28.6% had children under the age of 18; 50.6% were married couples living together; 12.4% had a female householder with no husband present and 32.0% were non-families. Of all households, 22.8% were made up of individuals and 9.1% had someone living alone who was 65 years of age or older. The average household size was 2.51 and the average family size was 2.91.

21.1% of the population were under the age of 18, 7.6% from 18 to 24, 28.7% from 25 to 44, 30.5% from 45 to 64, and 12.0% who were 65 years of age or older. The median age was 40.4 years. For every 100 females, the population had 99.3 males. For every 100 females ages 18 and older there were 100.8 males.

The Census Bureau's 2006–2010 American Community Survey showed that (in 2010 inflation-adjusted dollars) median household income was $67,000 (with a margin of error of +/− $20,882) and the median family income was $78,889 (+/− $19,386). Males had a median income of $54,583 (+/− $21,861) versus $41,667 (+/− $24,816) for females. The per capita income for the borough was $34,262 (+/− $7,656). About 6.7% of families and 12.7% of the population were below the poverty line, including 21.3% of those under age 18 and none of those age 65 or over.

=== 2000 census ===
As of the 2000 United States census there were 658 people, 261 households, and 180 families residing in the borough. The population density was 451.9 inhabitants per square mile (174.5/km^{2}). There were 273 housing units at an average density of 187.5 per square mile (72.4/km^{2}). The racial makeup of the borough was 92.71% White, 2.28% African American, 0.76% Native American, 2.28% Asian, 0.15% Pacific Islander, 1.22% from other races, and 0.61% from two or more races. Hispanic or Latino of any race were 2.58% of the population.

There were 261 households, out of which 29.1% had children under the age of 18 living with them, 50.6% were married couples living together, 14.2% had a female householder with no husband present, and 30.7% were non-families. 24.9% of all households were made up of individuals, and 6.5% had someone living alone who was 65 years of age or older. The average household size was 2.52 and the average family size was 2.98.

In the borough the population was spread out, with 21.7% under the age of 18, 7.6% from 18 to 24, 35.3% from 25 to 44, 25.5% from 45 to 64, and 9.9% who were 65 years of age or older. The median age was 38 years. For every 100 females, there were 103.7 males. For every 100 females age 18 and over, there were 98.8 males.

The median income for a household in the borough was $60,000, and the median income for a family was $69,688. Males had a median income of $38,056 versus $30,950 for females. The per capita income for the borough was $25,914. None of the families and 2.8% of the population were living below the poverty line, including no under eighteens and 9.1% of those over 64.

== Government ==
=== Local government ===
Andover is governed under the borough form of New Jersey municipal government, which is used in 218 municipalities (of the 564) statewide, making it the most common form of government in New Jersey. The governing body is comprised of the mayor and the borough council, with all positions elected at-large on a partisan basis as part of the November general election. The mayor is elected directly by the voters to a four-year term of office. The borough council includes six members elected to serve three-year terms on a staggered basis, with two seats coming up for election each year in a three-year cycle. The borough form of government used by Andover is a "weak mayor / strong council" government in which council members act as the legislative body with the mayor presiding at meetings and voting only in the event of a tie. The mayor can veto ordinances subject to an override by a two-thirds majority vote of the council. The mayor makes committee and liaison assignments for council members, and most appointments are made by the mayor with the advice and consent of the council.

As of 2024, the mayor of Andover Borough is Republican John A. Morgan, whose term of office ends December 31, 2027. Members of the Borough Council are Melvin Dennison (R, 2024), Frederick DiRenzo (R, 2026), Jason Lane (R, 2025), Randolph Mallon (D, 2025), Robert L. Smith (R, 2024) and Erin K. Webb (R, 2026).

In February 2022, the borough council selected Randolph Mallon to fill the seat expiring in December 2022 that had been held by Peter Pearson until he resigned from office the previous month.

In February 2016, the borough council chose John Hoag from three candidates proposed by the Republican municipal committee to fill the seat that had been held Eskil S. Danielson that will expire in December 2017; Hoag will serve on an interim basis until the November 2016 general election, when voters will choose someone to serve the balance of the term.

In February 2015, the borough council selected Michael Figueiredo from a list of three candidates nominated by the Democratic municipal committee to fill the seat expiring in December 2016 that became vacant when Deborah McGowan resigned from office. Figueiredo served on an interim basis until the November 2015 general election, when he was elected to serve the one year remaining on the term of office.

Law enforcement is covered by the New Jersey State Police. Fire protection is covered by the Andover Borough Volunteer Fire Department. EMS is handled by the Lakeland Emergency Squad.

=== Federal, state, and county representation ===
Andover Borough is located in the 7th Congressional district and is part of New Jersey's 24th state legislative district.

For the 119th United States Congress, New Jersey's 7th congressional district is represented by Thomas Kean Jr. (R, Westfield). New Jersey is represented in the United States Senate by Democrats Cory Booker (Newark, term ends 2027) and Andy Kim (Moorestown, term ends 2031).

For the 2026–2027 session, the 24th legislative district of the New Jersey Legislature is represented in the State Senate by Parker Space (R, Wantage Township) and in the General Assembly by Dawn Fantasia (R, Franklin) and Mike Inganamort (R, Chester Township).

Sussex County is governed by a Board of County Commissioners whose five members are elected at-large in partisan elections on a staggered basis, with either one or two seats coming up for election each year. At an annual reorganization meeting held in the beginning of January, the board selects a Commissioner Director and Deputy Director from among its members, with day-to-day supervision of the operation of the county delegated to a County Administrator. As of 2025, Sussex County's Commissioners are Director Jill Space (R, Wantage Township, 2025), Deputy Director Chris Carney (R, Frankford Township, 2027), Jack DeGroot (R, Sussex, 2026), William Hayden (I, Branchville, 2025) and Alan Henderson (R, Lafayette Township, 2027).

Constitutional officers elected on a countywide basis are Clerk Jeffrey M. Parrott (R, Wantage Township, 2026), Sheriff Michael F. Strada (R, Hampton Township, 2025) and Surrogate Gary R. Chiusano (R, Frankford Township, 2028).

=== Politics ===
As of March 2011, there were a total of 403 registered voters in Andover, of which 109 (27.0% vs. 16.5% countywide) were registered as Democrats, 152 (37.7% vs. 39.3%) were registered as Republicans and 142 (35.2% vs. 44.1%) were registered as Unaffiliated. There were no voters registered to other parties. Among the borough's 2010 Census population, 66.5% (vs. 65.8% in Sussex County) were registered to vote, including 84.3% of those ages 18 and over (vs. 86.5% countywide).

Gubernatorial election results for Andover
Year	Republican		Democratic		Third party(ies)	
Year	No.	%	No.	%	No.	%
2025	134	55.14%	109	44.86%	0	0.00%
2021	151	71.90%	58	27.62%	1	0.48%
2017	101	56.74%	70	39.33%	7	3.93%
2013	106	61.63%	56	32.56%	10	5.81%
2009	117	59.09%	61	30.81%	20	10.10%
2005	125	55.56%	96	42.67%	4	1.78%

In the 2012 presidential election, Republican Mitt Romney received 143 votes (50.9% vs. 59.4% countywide), ahead of Democrat Barack Obama with 129 votes (45.9% vs. 38.2%) and other candidates with 8 votes (2.8% vs. 2.1%), among the 281 ballots cast by the borough's 400 registered voters, for a turnout of 70.3% (vs. 68.3% in Sussex County). In the 2008 presidential election, Republican John McCain received 139 votes (49.5% vs. 59.2% countywide) tied with Democrat Barack Obama with 139 votes (49.5% vs. 38.7%) and other candidates with 2 votes (0.7% vs. 1.5%), among the 281 ballots cast by the borough's 404 registered voters, for a turnout of 69.6% (vs. 76.9% in Sussex County). In the 2004 presidential election, Republican George W. Bush received 171 votes (55.5% vs. 63.9% countywide), ahead of Democrat John Kerry with 134 votes (43.5% vs. 34.4%) and other candidates with one vote (0.3% vs. 1.3%), among the 308 ballots cast by the borough's 421 registered voters, for a turnout of 73.2% (vs. 77.7% in the whole county).

United States presidential election results for Andover 2024 2020 2016 2012 2008 2004
Year	Republican		Democratic		Third party(ies)	
Year	No.	%	No.	%	No.	%
2024	180	57.69%	127	40.71%	5	1.60%
2020	205	58.91%	135	38.79%	8	2.30%
2016	172	61.65%	92	32.97%	15	5.38%
2012	143	51.07%	129	46.07%	8	2.86%
2008	139	49.64%	139	49.64%	2	0.71%
2004	171	55.88%	134	43.79%	1	0.33%

In the 2013 gubernatorial election, Republican Chris Christie received 61.6% of the vote (106 cast), ahead of Democrat Barbara Buono with 32.6% (56 votes), and other candidates with 5.8% (10 votes), among the 173 ballots cast by the borough's 396 registered voters (1 ballot was spoiled), for a turnout of 43.7%. In the 2009 gubernatorial election, Republican Chris Christie received 117 votes (58.8% vs. 63.3% countywide), ahead of Democrat Jon Corzine with 61 votes (30.7% vs. 25.7%), Independent Chris Daggett with 18 votes (9.0% vs. 9.1%) and other candidates with 2 votes (1.0% vs. 1.3%), among the 199 ballots cast by the borough's 386 registered voters, yielding a 51.6% turnout (vs. 52.3% in the county).

United States Senate election results for Andover1
Year	Republican		Democratic		Third party(ies)	
Year	No.	%	No.	%	No.	%
2024	170	56.48%	118	39.20%	13	4.32%
2018	136	57.87%	81	34.47%	18	7.66%
2012	140	51.28%	120	43.96%	13	4.76%
2006	78	54.17%	58	40.28%	8	5.56%

United States Senate election results for Andover2
Year	Republican		Democratic		Third party(ies)	
Year	No.	%	No.	%	No.	%
2020	193	55.62%	131	37.75%	23	6.63%
2014	74	53.24%	63	45.32%	2	1.44%
2013	68	61.26%	43	38.74%	0	0.00%
2008	126	47.19%	127	47.57%	14	5.24%

== Education ==
Public school students in pre-kindergarten through eighth grade attend the Andover Regional School District, together with students from Andover Township. As of the 2021–22 school year, the district, comprised of two schools, had an enrollment of 416 students and 52.2 classroom teachers (on an FTE basis), for a student–teacher ratio of 8.0:1. Schools in the district (with 2021–22 enrollment data from the National Center for Education Statistics) are Florence M. Burd Elementary School with 218 students in grades PreK-4 and Long Pond Middle School with 195 students in grades 5-8. The district's board of education is comprised of nine members who set policy and oversee the fiscal and educational operation of the district through its administration, with Andover Borough assigned one of the nine seats, based on the population of the two constituent municipalities.

Public school students in ninth through twelfth grades attend Newton High School in Newton, together with students from Andover Township and Green Township, as part of a sending/receiving relationship with the Newton Public School District. As of the 2021–22 school year, the high school had an enrollment of 710 students and 60.0 classroom teachers (on an FTE basis), for a student–teacher ratio of 11.8:1.

Since 1972, Lakeland Andover School has been operating as a therapeutic, nonprofit, private day school for students in grades 7–12, serving the educational and vocational training needs of students with emotional and behavioral challenges.

== Transportation ==
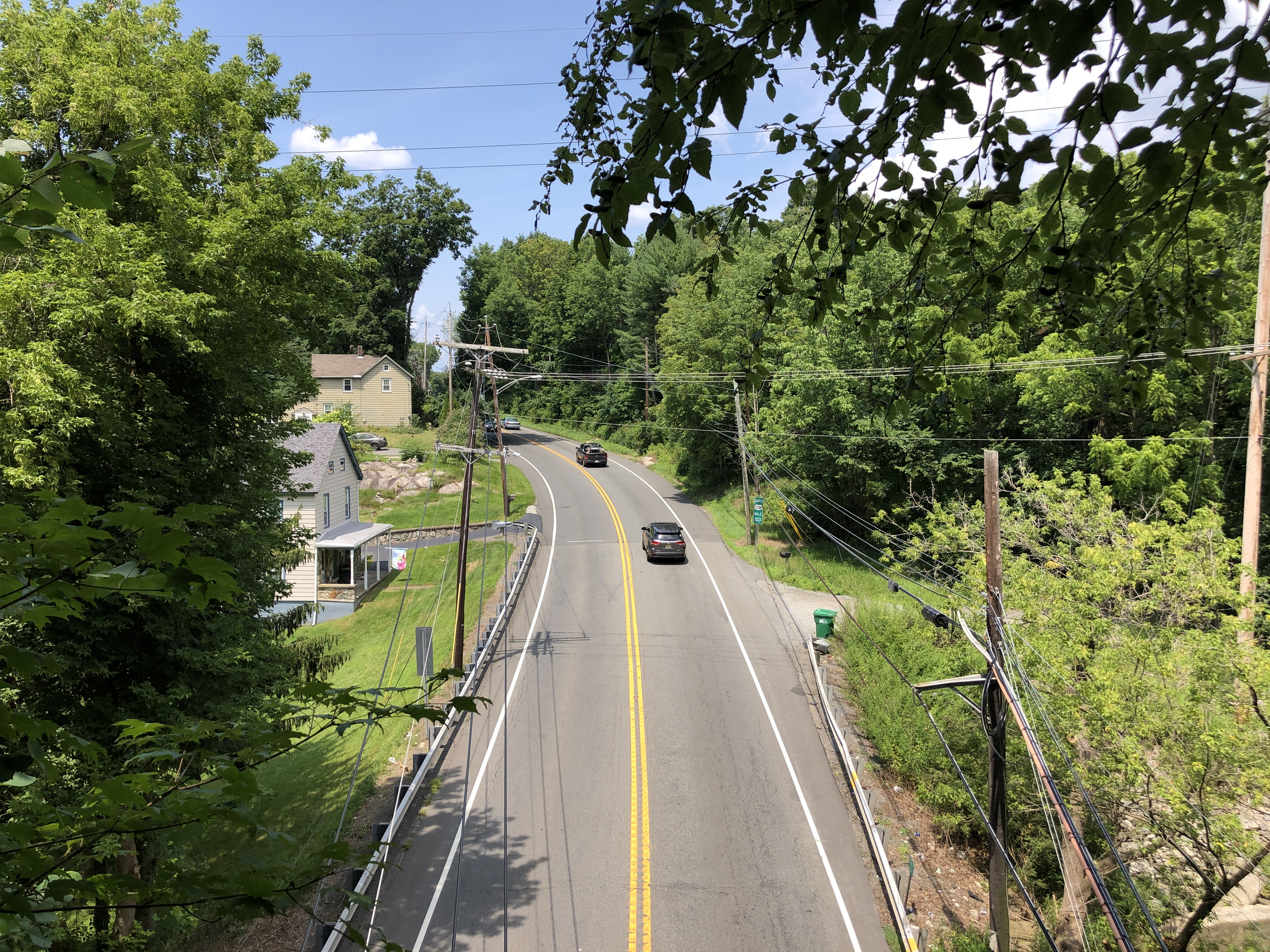
U.S. Route 206 northbound in Andover

=== Roads and highways ===
As of May 2010, the borough had a total of 7.41 miles (11.93 km) of roadways, of which 1.92 miles (3.09 km) were maintained by the municipality, 3.18 miles (5.12 km) by Sussex County and 2.31 miles (3.72 km) by the New Jersey Department of Transportation.

U.S. Route 206 and County Route 517 pass through the borough.

=== Public transportation ===
Lakeland Bus Lines provides service operating along Interstate 80 between Newton, New Jersey, and the Port Authority Bus Terminal in Midtown Manhattan.

As part of restoring train service via the Lackawanna Cut-Off, $61 million had been secured by then U.S. Congressman Rodney Frelinghuysen for NJ Transit to rebuild a 7.3 miles (11.7 km) stretch of the former railroad to a new station in Andover Township, which had been projected by 2021 but currently is estimated to open in 2026.

Aeroflex-Andover Airport is located 2 miles (3.2 km) north of the central business district and Trinca Airport, 3 miles (4.8 km) southwest.

== Points of interest ==
Several places in Andover are listed on the New Jersey Register of Historic Places. The Grist Mill Stone House, built 1760, is part of the Andover Iron Forge and Furnace and Workers' Housing area in the Andover Borough Historic District. The ornate house on Brighton Avenue is listed individually. The Hole in the Wall Stone Arch Bridge, built by the Sussex Railroad, crosses the Morris and Sussex Turnpike and now carries the Sussex Branch Trail, a rail trail.

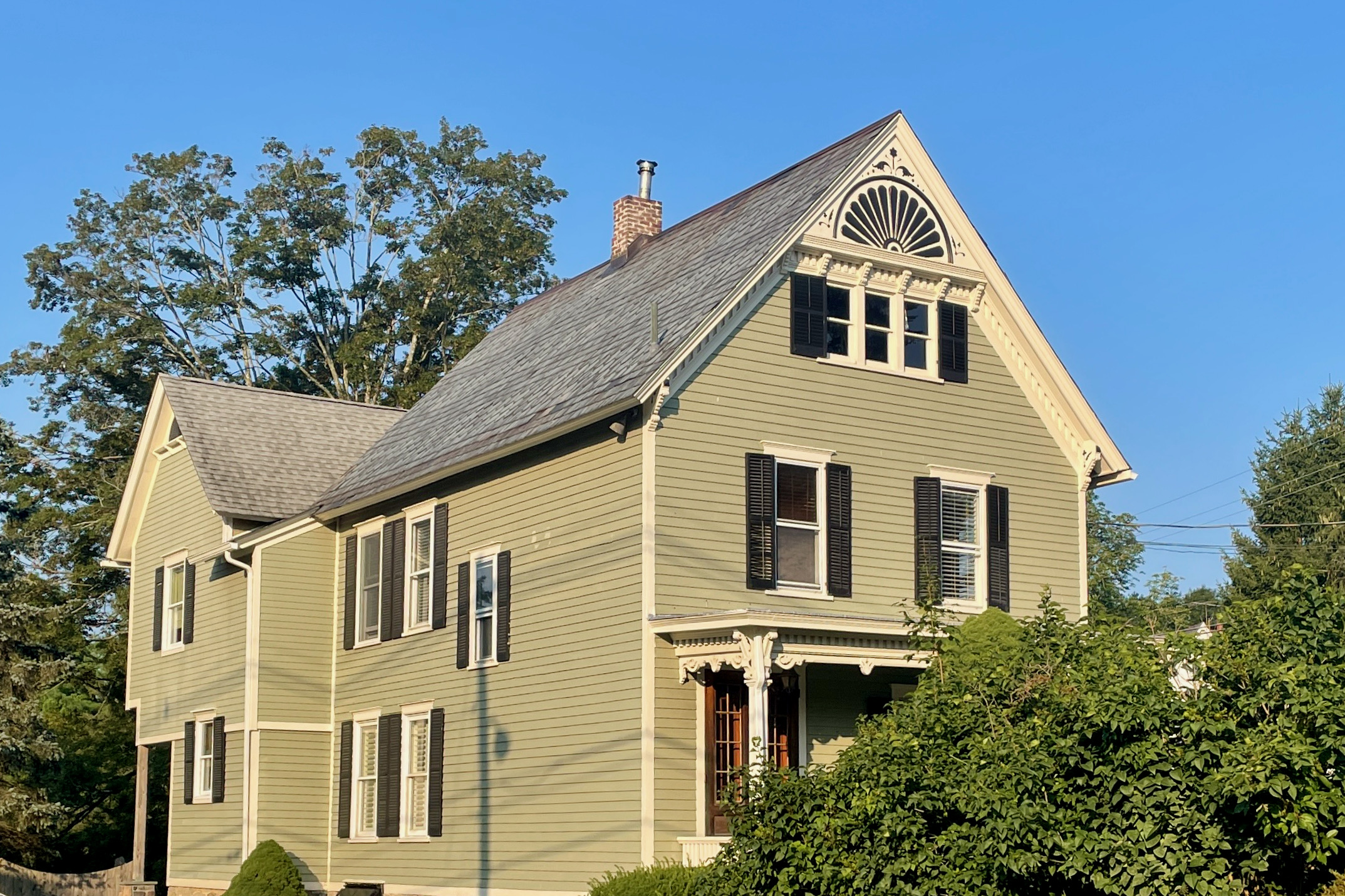
Brighton Avenue House

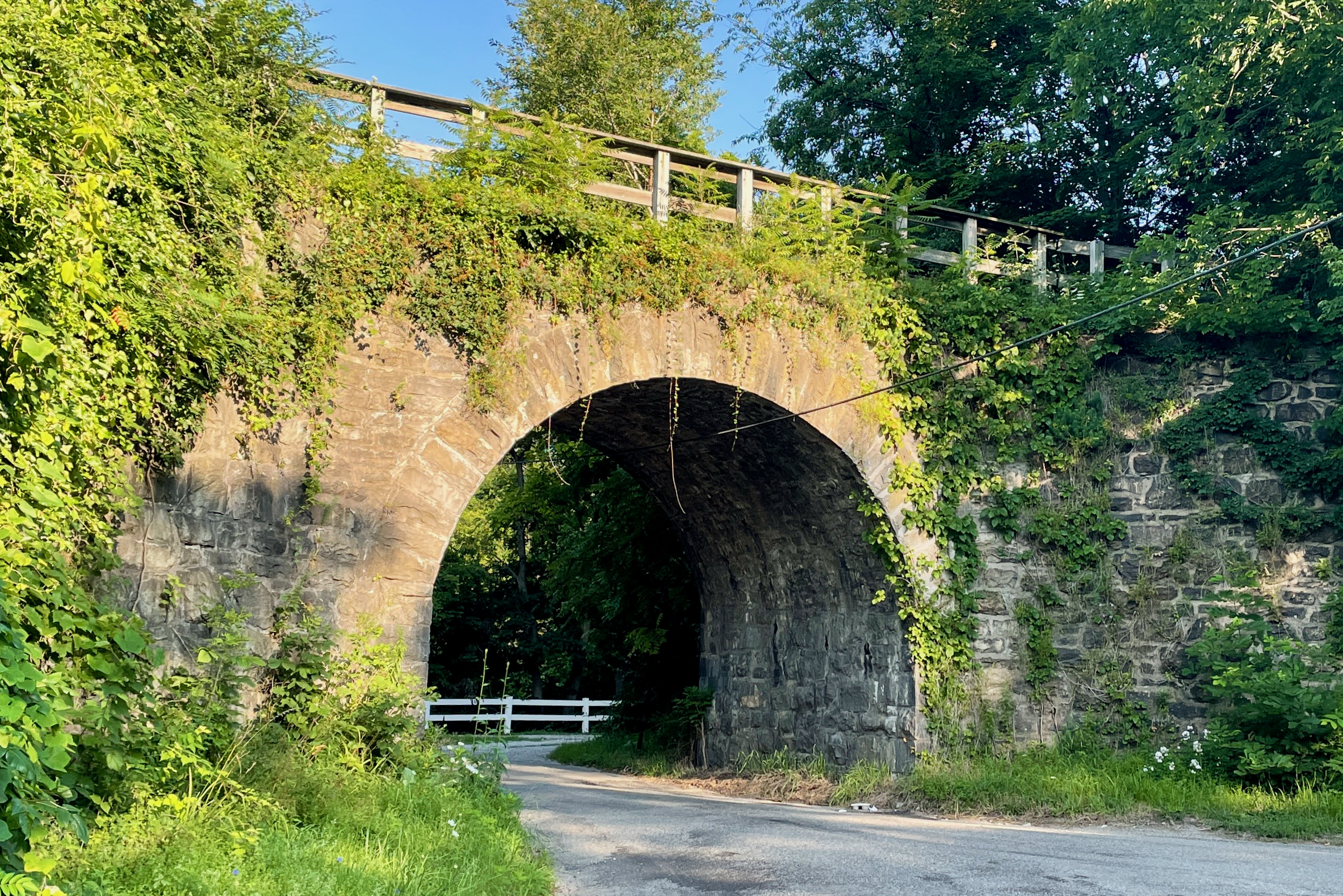
Hole in the Wall Stone Arch Bridge

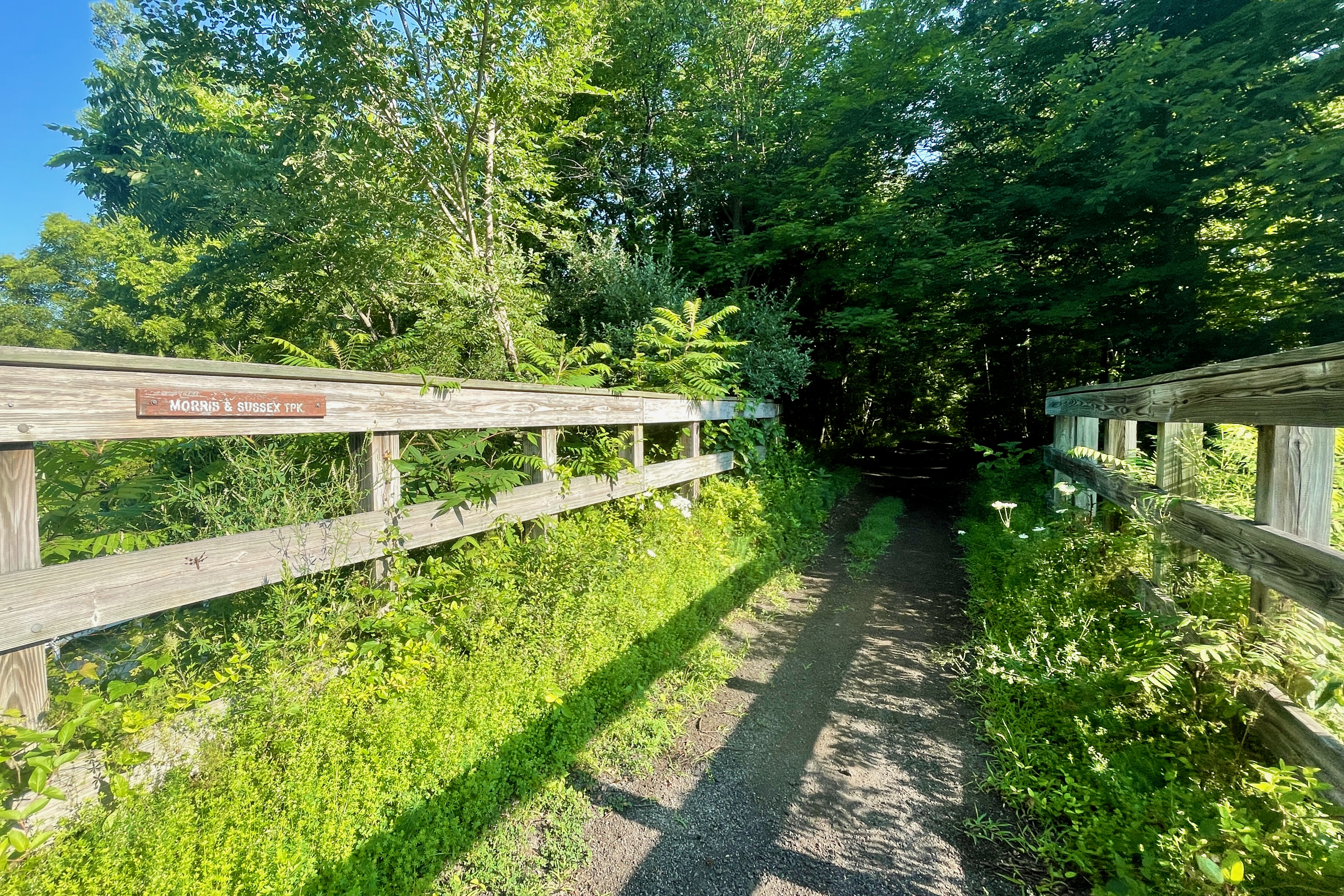
Sussex Branch Trail

The Iron Master's Mansion on Main Street was part of the Iron Works at Andover.

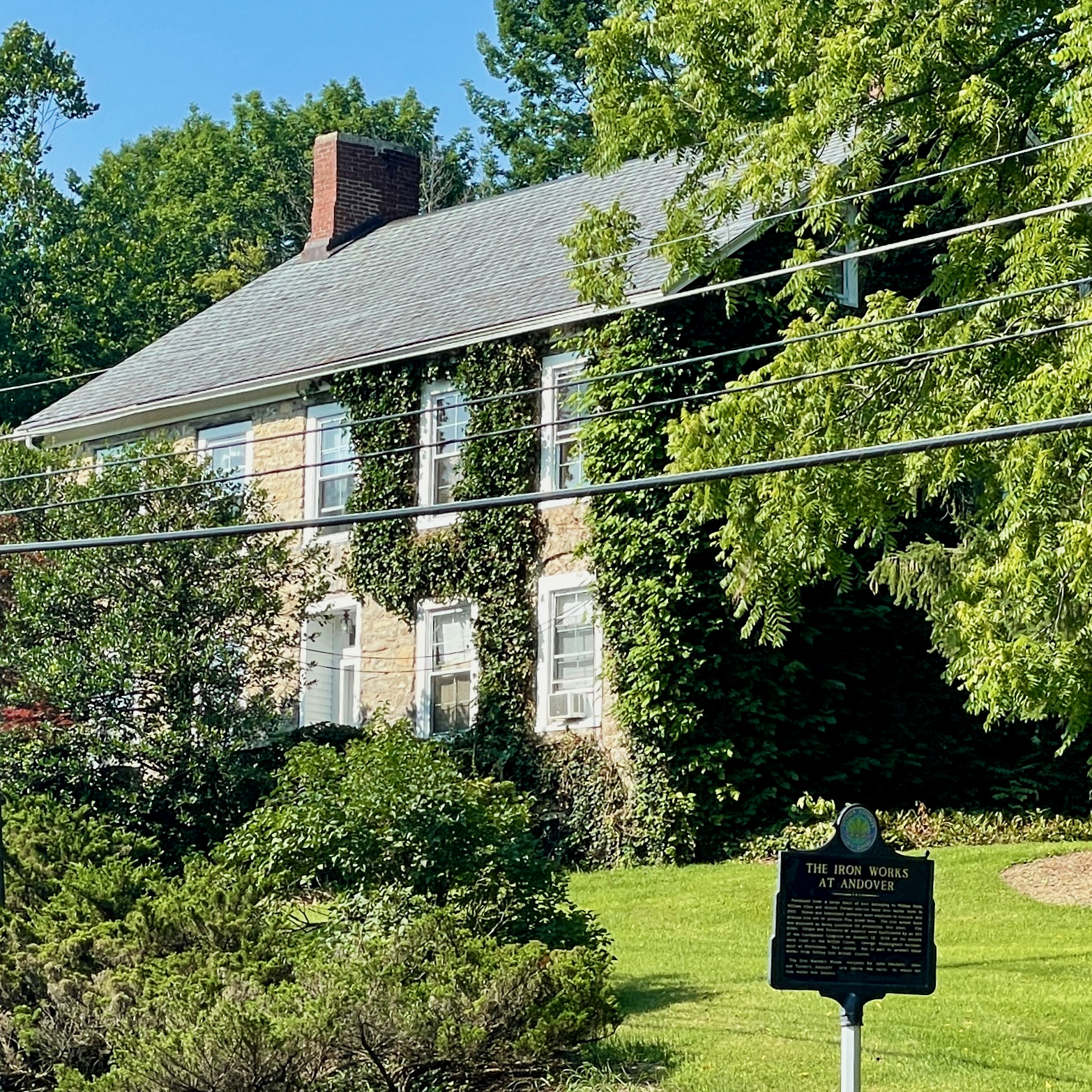
Iron Master's Mansion

== Notable people ==
People who were born in, residents of, or otherwise closely associated with Andover include:

- Stephen M. Balzer (c. 1864–1940), mechanic and developer of an early car and airplane engine
- Kenneth Burke (1897–1993), cultural and literary critic and philosopher; Harry and Tom Chapin's grandfather
- Finn M. W. Caspersen (1941–2009), financier and philanthropist
- Newman E. Drake (1860–1930), founder of the Drake's baking company
- Rob Freeman (born 1981), member of Hidden in Plain View
