= American Lindy Hop Championships =

Swing dance event

The American Lindy Hop Championships is a major dance convention dedicated primarily to Lindy Hop. In the 1990s Lindy Hop dancers competed in a separate category of West Coast Swing competitions, so Paulette Brockington in 1998 created an event "by Lindy Hoppers for Lindy Hoppers". The competition remained popular "well into the twenty-first century".

The first competition happened on a four-day Halloween weekend in 1998 at the Playboy Resort (Vernon Township, New Jersey) and was produced, in part, with the aid of Boogie Dance Productions, a New York-based dance promoter. It was chronicled in the Year in Pictures edition of Life Magazine as a first-of-its-kind event promoting Lindy Hop and its sister dances at the time - tap, jazz and blues dancing. It hosted an international audience of dancers who came to be part of the first event since the extended Swing Era to concentrate on Lindy Hop. The main divisions included Classic, Strictly Lindy, Blues, and American Showcase.

Emphasis is placed onto showcase categories.

== Sources ==
- Sfetcu, N. (2014). Dance Music. Nicolae Sfetcu.
- Stevens, T.; Stevens, E. (2011). Swing Dancing. The American Dance Floor. Bloomsbury Publishing. ISBN 978-0-313-37518-7.
- Time-Life Books (1999). The Year in Pictures, 1998. Time Incorporated. ISBN 978-1-883013-60-8.
- Gardner, Cindy (Fall 1999). "Paulette's Goals: Create U.S. "Champs"" (PDF). Strutters Quarterly. 9 (4). TC SWING: 2.
- "1st Annual American Lindy Hop Championships". Strutters Quarterly (3). 1998. (cited from Stevens & Stevens, 2011)
