= Peabody (dance) =

Fast foxtrot-type dance done to ragtime music

The Peabody is an American ballroom dance that evolved from the fast foxtrot of the ragtime era of the 1910s and 1920s.

== Background ==
Soon after the introduction of the foxtrot in 1914, two variations developed: a slow version done at about forty measures per minute and a fast version done at more than fifty measures per minute. In England, the fast foxtrot was called the quickstep; in America it was called the Peabody, named after a New York policeman, Lieutenant William Frank Peabody (1873-1939). He was a good-natured man, husband, father, who was light on his feet and who loved to dance. A popular member of New York ragtime dancing circles, he especially enjoyed dancing the fast foxtrot, which was gaining popularity in 1915. Because he was married, Officer Peabody would hold his partner on his right side in a manner known as the English or the right-outside position. The dance that came to be called the Peabody was thus based on an unusual dance position for the partners, which led to some unique steps and floor patterns. The dance of the International School known as the Quickstep evolved from the Peabody -- according to oral legend, dancers from England saw it while visiting the United States, in attempting to reconstruct it, composed new elements to fill in for what they didn't remember. Thus, the Peabody and the Quickstep bear little resemblance to each other, although some of the steps are the same.

== Description ==
The Peabody is a brisk dance that covers a lot of space on the dance floor. Danced to almost any 2/4 or 4/4 ragtime tune of appropriate tempo, it is essentially a fast one-step, with long, gliding strides and a few syncopations. The leader changes sides as he travels around the floor and adds promenades and simple turns as the dance progresses. The partners may also add slight dipping motions with their upper bodies once they master the rhythm and flow of movement. In competitions and exhibitions, Peabody dancers sometimes wear appropriate ragtime dress: suits and straw boaters or bowler hats for the gentlemen and long, full dresses for the ladies. Music suitable for dancing the Peabody includes "When the Saints Go Marching In," "Ain't She Sweet?," "Yes, We Have No Bananas," "Tiger Rag," "Bourbon Street Parade," and other ragtime tunes of New Orleans jazz men of the late 1910s and early 1920s.

== Film and video ==
The Library of Congress holds an archival video, intended for research purposes only, containing rare film clips from the 1900s through the 1930s. One segment shows Tony DeMarco and Sally DeMarco, professional exhibition dancers, performing the Peabody. It is available for general viewing only by special order. More accessible are prints of the 1936 film Swing Time, in which Fred Astaire and Ginger Rogers perform a tap and ballroom dance that is loosely based on the Peabody. Set to Jerome Kern's catchy tune "Pick Yourself Up," it is clearly a theatrical number, not a social dance, but it perfectly captures the playfulness and joyousness of the popular dance. A more serious work is Roseland, a 1977 film released by Merchant-Ivory Productions. Consisting of three separate stories of lonely people searching for a partner, on the dance floor and in life, it was filmed on the premises of Roseland, a famous ballroom on West 52nd Street in New York City. In the segment on the Peabody, the elderly Rosa, played by Lila Skala, dreams of winning the regularly held Peabody dance contest, even though her partner, who has more romantic dreams, is not the best dancer on the floor. They both hope to achieve their dreams before age makes dancing no longer possible.

Other performances of the Peabody can be seen in video clips mounted on the Internet, including three that are particularly notable. Sandra Cameron and Paul Grecki danced a smooth, elegant, lighthearted version to Glen Gray's "Maniac's Ball" at the Dance of the Year celebration in 1991. A much more energetic version, combined with the Charleston, was danced by Chad Fasca and Midori Asakura to Sammy Ulano's "Bourbon Street Parade" at the 2004 American Lindy Hop Championships. Their exhibition performance won first place in the fast dance division. A few years later, Mark and Brenda Judkins did a Peabody routine to "Mr. Sandman" by Pat Ballard at the MGM Grand Ball in Longview, Texas. Although the song dates from the 1950s rather than the ragtime era, the tempo is perfectly suited to the signature steps of the dance. Further, as Mr. Judkins was somewhat portly at the time, he is a welcome reminder of the rotund, graceful Officer Peabody.
