= Hidden Valley (New Jersey) =

Defunct ski resort in New Jersey, United States

- Location of Hidden Valley in northern New Jersey Hidden Valley (New Jersey) Hidden Valley (the United States)
- Location: Vernon Township, Sussex County, New Jersey, United States
- Nearest city: New York City; 1 hour southeast
- Coordinates: 41°11′8.16″N 74°28′50.16″W
- Status: Defunct
- Vertical: 620 ft (189 m)
- Top elevation: 1,435 ft (437 m) AMSL
- Base elevation: 815 ft (248 m)
- Trails: 15 total: 25% easiest; 30% more difficult; 45% most difficult
- Longest run: Browse Along; 0.75 miles (1.2 km)
- Lift system: 3 chairlifts: 1 triple; 2 doubles 1 surface lift
- Lift capacity: 3500 per hr
- Terrain parks: 1
- Snowmaking: 100%
- Night skiing: 100%

Hidden Valley was a ski resort in Vernon Township, New Jersey, United States, located off of County Route 515, near the intersection with Route 94, approximately an hour's drive from the George Washington Bridge. Since January 2016, the area has been repurposed as the National Winter Activity Center, which provides education and ski/snowboard instruction to groups that might not have access to winter sports.

== History ==
Built by Jack and Peg Kurlander, the resort opened in 1975. In 2007, after years of struggling to compete with the nearby and much larger Mountain Creek, the resort declared bankruptcy and was sold at a sheriff's auction. A group of investors bought it at auction with the intention of turning it into an all-inclusive resort. After an unusually warm winter in 2011 and numerous problems throughout, it was once again put up for liquidation auction in the fall of 2013. It failed to sell at auction, and did not open for the 2013/2014 ski season.

The National Winter Activity Center (NWAC) conceived and headed by CEO Schone Malliet began operating at the former Hidden Valley site In February 2014.

== The mountain ==
Hidden Valley's summit elevation is 1,435 feet (437 m) above sea level and its base is at 815 feet (248 m), yielding a vertical drop of 620 feet (189 m). The resort had 15 trails - 25% beginner, 30% intermediate, and 45% advanced. The longest trail was Browse Along at three quarters of a mile (1.2 km). the mountain features a total of three lifts: two chairlifts (2 Quads) and a surface lift.

== Notable skiers ==
Champion freestyle skier Donna Weinbrecht, an Olympic gold medalist in moguls, learned to ski and trained at Hidden Valley.

Alpine skiers David Schneider Jr., Drew Schneider and Todd Schneider were brothers who trained at Hidden Valley. David made the US training squad at 17, Drew was invited to the U.S. Ski Team at age 14 and Todd later raced on the U.S. Ski Team in the late 1980s to early 90s. David Schneider, their father, was the head of and created the alpine training program in the 1970s at Great Gorge and Vernon Valley ski areas before the opening of Hidden Valley. He was also the first coach that Donna Weinbrecht had before she turned to freestyle, per Dave Schneider's recommendation.

Nolan Kasper, a slalom racer with the U.S. Ski Team, began skiing at Hidden Valley in the early 1990s at age three; his father was a ski instructor at the area.
