= Legends Resort & Country Club =

Defunct hotel in New Jersey, built by Hugh Hefner

Coordinates: 41.1894°N 74.5319°W

The Legends Resort & Country Club, often called simply Legends, was a hotel located on County Route 517 in Vernon Township in Sussex County, New Jersey, United States. In the 1970s, Hugh Hefner built the facility as The Great Gorge Playboy Club Hotel, and it officially opened in 1972. The Playboy Club was sold in 1982 to the Americana Hotel franchise . The hotel was sold again to the Seasons Investment Corp. and reopened in 1991 as the Seasons Resort and Conference Center. The property was sold yet again to parent-company Metairie Corp (owned by Hillel A. "Hillie" Meyers with individual hotel rooms owned by Andrew Mulvihill), which reopened the hotel as the Legends Resort & Country Club. The hotel declined severely after 2000 and has been nearly derelict with the amenities all damaged and shut down. The hotel did stay open but mostly housed recipients since about 2005. After evicting long term tenants, the hotel finally closed to public operations in April 2018 with various plans to restore it for commercial use of some sort. In July 2024 Mayor Anthony Rossi announced that the property had been sold to an affiliate of Lockwood Hotels.

== The hotel ==
During the 1970s, the Great Gorge Playboy Club had 800 rooms, but various owners since that time have combined units and converted many into condominiums, reducing the total number to less than 400 rooms at the current Legends Resort & Country Club. The eight-floor hotel has a cabaret, ballroom, restaurant, a fitness center, indoor pool, jacuzzis and an Olympic-sized swimming pool located outside. Most of the rooms have been renovated at least once, but some are still set up as originally constructed in 1970s decor. Much of the hotel became derelict by 2005.

== History ==
The Playboy Club, in the 1970s, was the host of the first New Jersey Special Olympic Games.

In 1978, six Bunnies were among about dozen women who were lured to a house in nearby Glenwood Lake, drugged and filmed in various non-consensual sex acts. The women were blackmailed to give up money and act as drug mules.

=== 2008 murder ===
David Haulmark, a 36-year-old contract laborer living in the Legends Resort & Country Club, was beaten to death outside the hotel on August 17, 2008. Haulmark, an Oklahoma native who was working on a pipeline project in nearby New York, was found lying on a sidewalk near the east entrance of the resort around 3 a.m. He had been battered around the face and head, and authorities determined the cause of death to be blunt force trauma to the head, neck and face. Jacob R. Gentry, 27; Jarrod C. Gentry, 20, of Port Jervis, New York and Emily M. Henry, 24, of Plymouth, Michigan, were arrested in Port Jervis on August 17 in connection with the homicide. The Gentry brothers were charged with first-degree murder and endangering an injured victim. Henry allegedly pepper sprayed Haulmark and left the scene of the crime; she was charged with endangering an injured victim and aggravated assault with a deadly weapon.

Defense attorneys said Jarrod Gentry jumped in to defend his brother after Haulmark and Jacob Gentry got into a fight. Gentry family members said Jacob Gentry had previously lived in Legends and moved out due to prior physical altercations with Haulmark over Henry, who was Jacob's girlfriend. Jacob Gentry also worked as a contract laborer with Precision Pipeline, the same Eau Claire, Wisconsin-based company where Haulmark worked. The Gentry brothers and Henry, all previously lived in Michigan (the Gentry brothers are originally from Tennessee), waived their extraditions from Orange County, New York on August 19 and will be tried in Vernon. The crime was the first murder charged in Sussex County in almost two years.

All three suspects were incarcerated in Sussex County Jail, but Jarrod Gentry was released in 2011, having been sentenced to time served. Jacob Gentry was sentenced to 30 years in prison for his primary role in the murder. 19 February 2016, after having his original conviction overturned, Jacob Gentry was found not guilty on all charges in a jury retrial.

In December 2008, Haulmark's family sued the owners of Legends Resort, alleging that negligence of hotel staff led to Haulmark's death. According to witnesses, two hotel bartenders saw Haulmark bleeding profusely outside the hotel doors on the night of his death but did not assist him, and in fact one bartender allegedly instructed patrons not to call 9-1-1. The suit alleged that the hotel had become a "den of trouble" including fights and drug use, with frequent responses to the hotel by police. The suit also alleged that the hotel bar did not have a bouncer or check for underage drinkers.

=== 2012 fire ===
On March 16, 2012, the McAfee Fire Department and other fire units from Sussex County and Orange County responded to a 9-1-1 call at 9:02PM reporting a fire at the resort. The fire was restricted to the balcony of a vacant apartment, room 518, and caused limited damage. It was under control by 10:45PM. The fire was not considered suspicious, and may have been caused by a tossed cigarette. Fire units were forced to break open the front lobby doors to the hotel since they were locked. It was reported that 35 people were inside at that time and were forced to evacuate for a brief period of time. People were already leaving the hotel through a side door when firefighters arrived.

== Complaints from timeshare owners ==
We were promised this was going to be the jewel of the Northeast, and it's the pits.

— Robin Barren
timeshare owner with Legends Owners United

The Legends Resort & Country Club has been subject to several complaints and lawsuits in the 2000s (decade) by timeshare owners who argued that promised amenities were no longer available and that Legends officials were being dishonest and unreceptive to their concerns. Dozens of the owners, who formed an organization called Legends Owners United, said little upkeep had been done on the property, parts of the facade were falling off, the parking lot was cracking, tennis courts were deteriorating, interior ceilings were stained, hallway lighting was spotty, plywood covered some windows and many services were regularly closed, including an indoor pool, gym, restaurant, club and store. They also claimed Legends officials failed to provide them with statements documenting where money for repairs had been spent. About 1,600 people own Legends timeshares, which sold for between $8,000 and $11,000 each. Timeshare buyers generated $15 million in revenue for the Metairie company, as well as thousands more each year in maintenance fees.

Three lawsuits against Legends have been consolidated and are currently pending in New Jersey Superior Court; two were filed by timeshare owners alleging mismanagement or impropriety in selling timeshares while the building was in violation of state fire codes, and one seeks class-action status for all timeshare owners. In a separate matter, Mountain Spa Inc., a McAfee-based spa company that rented space at Legends, sued the resort for $1 million in May 2006, alleging that the hotel frequently failed to provide heat and electricity when the spa rented space there starting in 2003. As a result, spa officials said they were frequently unable to operate its health club and had to close in August 2005. Hillel Meyers, Metairie Corp. president, acknowledged to state officials in a May 2005 letter that "the property may be properly characterized as 'distressed.'" Legends was previously part of RCI, one of the largest timeshare brokers in the world, but in December 2006, RCI removed it from the program, which many timeshare owners said significantly reduced their ability to trade vacation weeks with other resort locations. Legends Owners United has filed complaints with the Federal Trade Commission, the New Jersey Division of Consumer Affairs and the state Real Estate Commission. State real estate regulators launched an investigation into the Legends Resort & Country Club in early 2007 in response to the complaints. Legends and Metairie officials have indicated they plan to sell some of the company's assets and make improvements, but have not provided specific plans or a timetable for any such changes.

== Future ==
In 2005, the Vernon Township Zoning Board rejected a proposal by Metairie Corp. and another firm that included 372 townhouses on 580 acres (2.3 km^{2}) surrounding the property. Township officials refused to allow any new construction at the resort until renovations were completed at the hotel itself, which officials described as an "eyesore."

In 2011, the Vernon Township Council made several suggestions for the future of the Legends Resort property, including a potential Sussex County golf course, a medical center, or a community college branch. Also in 2011, The New Jersey Herald reported that according to Vernon mayor Vic Marotta, the owners of Legends Resort were in negotiations to sell the property. The property is "a problem for our community on many, many fronts," Marotta said. If successful, the sale could lead to a $100,000 construction project within the following five years.

In March 2024, Mayor Anthony Rossi announced that the building had been sold to an unnamed buyer, although the property's owner, Metairie Corporation, had not announced the sale themselves. On July 5, 2024, the sale was finalized and approved by the town's attorneys. Rossi stated that the sale had been made to an affiliate of Lockwood Hotels who intend to turn the property into a 300-room, internationally branded hotel with a world class spa, 150 residential condos, and the ability to hold concerts.

== In popular culture ==
Portions of the 1989 comedy See No Evil, Hear No Evil, starring Richard Pryor and Gene Wilder, were set and filmed at the hotel, referred to simply as the "Great Gorge Resort" in the movie. The swimming pool scene in the opening of the movie Dream House starring John Schneider and Marilu Henner was filmed there.

== Notable performers ==
- The 5th Dimension
- Ann-Margret
- Paul Anka
- Lucie Arnaz
- Frankie Avalon
- Jim Bailey
- Pearl Bailey
- Kaye Ballard
- Count Basie
- Harry Belafonte
- Tony Bennett
- Barbi Benton
- Milton Berle
- Shelley Berman
- Joey Bishop
- Harry Blackstone Jr.
- Debby Boone
- Pat Boone
- Julie Budd
- George Burns
- Red Buttons
- Charlie Callas
- Captain & Tennille
- George Carlin
- Vikki Carr
- Diahann Carroll
- Jack Carter
- Johnny Cash
- Charo
- Petula Clark
- Rosemary Clooney
- Natalie Cole
- Pat Cooper
- Bill Cosby
- Sammy Davis Jr.
- Phyllis Diller
- Vic Damone
- Duke Ellington
- Lola Falana
- Freddie Fender
- Totie Fields
- Eddie Fisher
- Roberta Flack
- Wayland Flowers
- The Four Tops
- Redd Foxx
- Sergio Franchi
- Connie Francis
- David Frye
- Gloria Gaynor
- Mitzi Gaynor
- George Gobel
- Frank Gorshin
- Dick Gregory
- Shecky Greene
- Buddy Hackett
- Lionel Hampton
- Joey Heatherton
- Engelbert Humperdinck
- Don Ho
- Bob Hope
- Phyllis Hyman
- Andy Kaufman
- Gabe Kaplan
- Lainie Kazan
- Chaka Khan
- Alan King
- Gladys Knight & the Pips
- Patti LaBelle
- Frankie Laine
- Steve Lawrence and Eydie Gormé
- Peggy Lee
- Liberace
- Little Richard
- Rich Little
- Trini Lopez
- Lorna Luft
- Barbara Mandrell
- Dean Martin
- Jackie Martling
- Al Martino
- Marilyn McCoo and Billy Davis Jr.
- Johnny Mathis
- Barbara McNair
- Roger Miller
- Stephanie Mills
- Liza Minnelli
- Paul Mooney
- Jaye P. Morgan
- Anne Murray
- Ricky Nelson
- Anthony Newley
- Wayne Newton
- Tony Orlando and Dawn
- LaWanda Page
- Patti Page
- Freda Payne
- Teddy Pendergrass
- Juliet Prowse
- Richard Pryor
- Lou Rawls
- Johnnie Ray
- Della Reese
- Debbie Reynolds
- Don Rickles
- Joan Rivers
- Johnny Rivers
- Smokey Robinson
- Kenny Rogers
- Nipsey Russell
- Mort Sahl
- Neil Sedaka
- Frank Sinatra
- Nancy Sinatra
- Jimmy Sturr
- Sonny & Cher
- Connie Stevens
- Enzo Stuarti
- Donna Summer
- The Supremes
- The Three Degrees
- Lily Tomlin
- Mel Tormé
- Tina Turner
- Sarah Vaughan
- The Village People
- Dionne Warwick
- Doc Watson
- Flip Wilson
- Nancy Wilson
- Tammy Wynette
- Henny Youngman
- Pia Zadora
