= Vernon Center, New Jersey =

Populated place in Sussex County, New Jersey, US

- Census-designated place
- Location in Sussex County Location in New Jersey Location in the United States
- Coordinates: 41.188789°N 74.504046°W
- Country: United States
- State: New Jersey
- County: Sussex
- Township: Vernon

Area
  - Total: 2.97 sq mi (7.68 km^{2})
  - Land: 2.95 sq mi (7.63 km^{2})
  - Water: 0.019 sq mi (0.05 km^{2}) 0.61%
- Elevation: 817 ft (249 m)

Population (2020)
  - Total: 1,743
  - Density: 591.6/sq mi (228.43/km^{2})
- Time zone: UTC−05:00 (Eastern (EST))
  - Summer (DST): UTC−04:00 (Eastern (EDT))
- Area codes: 862/973
- FIPS code: 34-75745
- GNIS feature ID: 02584037

Vernon Center is an unincorporated community and census-designated place (CDP) located in Vernon Township, in Sussex County, in the U.S. state of New Jersey. As of the 2020 census, Vernon Center had a population of 1,743.

== Geography ==
According to the United States Census Bureau, the CDP had a total area of 2.957 square miles (7.657 km^{2}), including 2.939 square miles (7.611 km^{2}) of land and 0.018 square miles (0.047 km^{2}) of water (0.61%).

== Demographics ==
Historical population
| Census | Pop. | Note | %± |
|---|---|---|---|
| 2010 | 1,713 | | — |
| 2020 | 1,743 | | 1.8% |
Population sources: 1950 1960 1970; 1980 1990 2000; 2010

Vernon Center first appeared as a census designated place in the 2010 U.S. census.

Vernon Center CDP, New Jersey – Racial and ethnic composition Note: the US Census treats Hispanic/Latino as an ethnic category. This table excludes Latinos from the racial categories and assigns them to a separate category. Hispanics/Latinos may be of any race.
| Race / Ethnicity (NH = Non-Hispanic) | Pop 2010 | Pop 2020 | % 2010 | % 2020 |
|---|---|---|---|---|
| White alone (NH) | 1,493 | 1,413 | 87.16% | 81.07% |
| Black or African American alone (NH) | 15 | 27 | 0.88% | 1.55% |
| Native American or Alaska Native alone (NH) | 1 | 1 | 0.06% | 0.06% |
| Asian alone (NH) | 29 | 9 | 1.69% | 0.52% |
| Native Hawaiian or Pacific Islander alone (NH) | 2 | 0 | 0.12% | 0.00% |
| Other race alone (NH) | 5 | 8 | 0.29% | 0.46% |
| Mixed race or Multiracial (NH) | 25 | 54 | 1.46% | 3.10% |
| Hispanic or Latino (any race) | 143 | 231 | 8.35% | 13.25% |
| Total | 1,713 | 1,743 | 100.00% | 100.00% |

=== 2010 census ===
The 2010 United States census counted 1,713 people, 846 households, and 416 families in the CDP. The population density was 582.9 per square mile (225.1/km^{2}). There were 1,228 housing units at an average density of 417.9 per square mile (161.4/km^{2}). The racial makeup was 93.75% (1,606) White, 0.99% (17) Black or African American, 0.12% (2) Native American, 1.69% (29) Asian, 0.12% (2) Pacific Islander, 1.46% (25) from other races, and 1.87% (32) from two or more races. Hispanic or Latino of any race were 8.35% (143) of the population.

Of the 846 households, 25.7% had children under the age of 18; 28.0% were married couples living together; 14.3% had a female householder with no husband present and 50.8% were non-families. Of all households, 42.6% were made up of individuals and 5.3% had someone living alone who was 65 years of age or older. The average household size was 2.02 and the average family size was 2.79.

21.6% of the population were under the age of 18, 7.9% from 18 to 24, 36.4% from 25 to 44, 27.2% from 45 to 64, and 6.9% who were 65 years of age or older. The median age was 36.1 years. For every 100 females, the population had 103.4 males. For every 100 females ages 18 and older there were 104.4 males.
