= Glenwood, New Jersey =

Populated place in Sussex County, New Jersey, US

- Unincorporated community
- Glenwood's location in Sussex County (Inset: Sussex County in New Jersey) Glenwood, New Jersey (New Jersey) Glenwood, New Jersey (the United States)
- Coordinates: 41°15′04″N 74°29′23″W
- Country: United States
- State: New Jersey
- County: Sussex
- Township: Vernon
- Elevation: 561 ft (171 m)
- ZIP Code: 07418
- GNIS feature ID: 0876639

Glenwood is an unincorporated area located within Vernon Township, in Sussex County, in the U.S. state of New Jersey. The area is served as United States Postal Service ZIP Code 07418.

As of the 2000 United States census, the population for ZIP Code Tabulation Area 07418 was 2,751.
