= County Route 515 (New Jersey) =

County highway in New Jersey, U.S.

County Route 515
- CR 515 highlighted in red

Route information
- Length: 13.0 mi (20.9 km)
- Tourist routes: Western Highlands Scenic Byway

Major junctions
- South end: Route 23 in Hardyston Township
- Route 94 in Vernon
- North end: Prices Switch Road at the New York state line

Location
- Country: United States
- State: New Jersey
- Counties: Sussex

Highway system
- County routes in New Jersey; 500-series routes
← CR 514	→ CR 516

County Route 515 (CR 515) is a county highway in the U.S. state of New Jersey. The highway extends 13.0 miles (20.9 km) from Route 23 in Hardyston Township to the New York state line in Vernon Township. Between Route 23 and Route 94, this highway is known as Vernon–Stockholm Road. The road then runs concurrent with Route 94 for 3 miles (4.8 km). It then splits off and is also known as Prices Switch Road. It then ends at the New York state line, where it continues as a local road.

== Route description ==
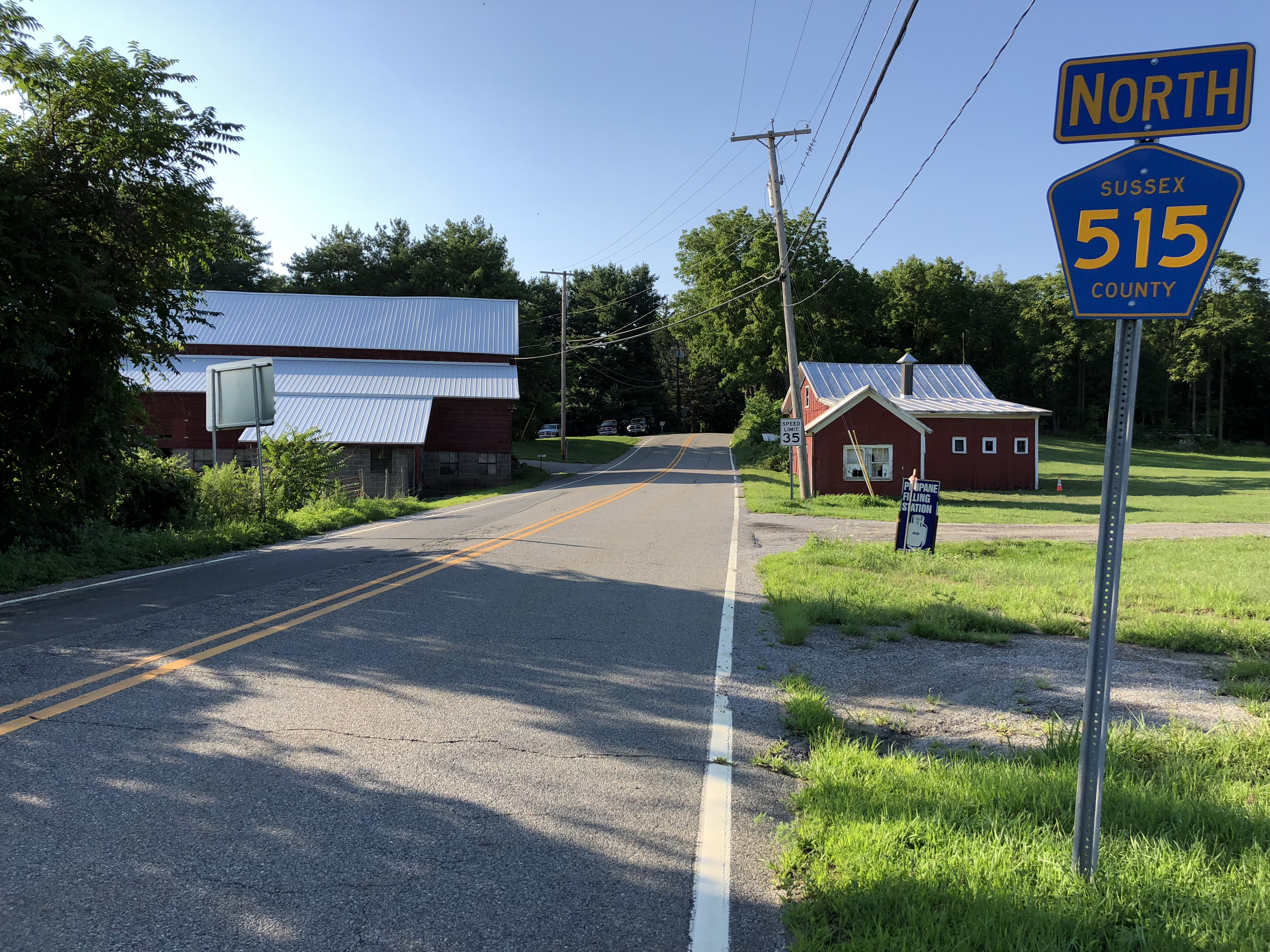
View north along CR 515 at Route 94 in Vernon Township

CR 515 begins at an intersection with Route 23 in Hardyston Township, heading to the north on two-lane undivided Vernon Road. The road crosses over the New York, Susquehanna and Western Railway's New Jersey Subdivision line and the Pequannock River as it passes a few homes before continuing into forested areas of mountains. The road continues into Vernon, continuing through rural areas with a few clusters of residential neighborhoods. The road intersects with Highland Lakes Road (CR 638) as homes on the road become more constant along with a few businesses.

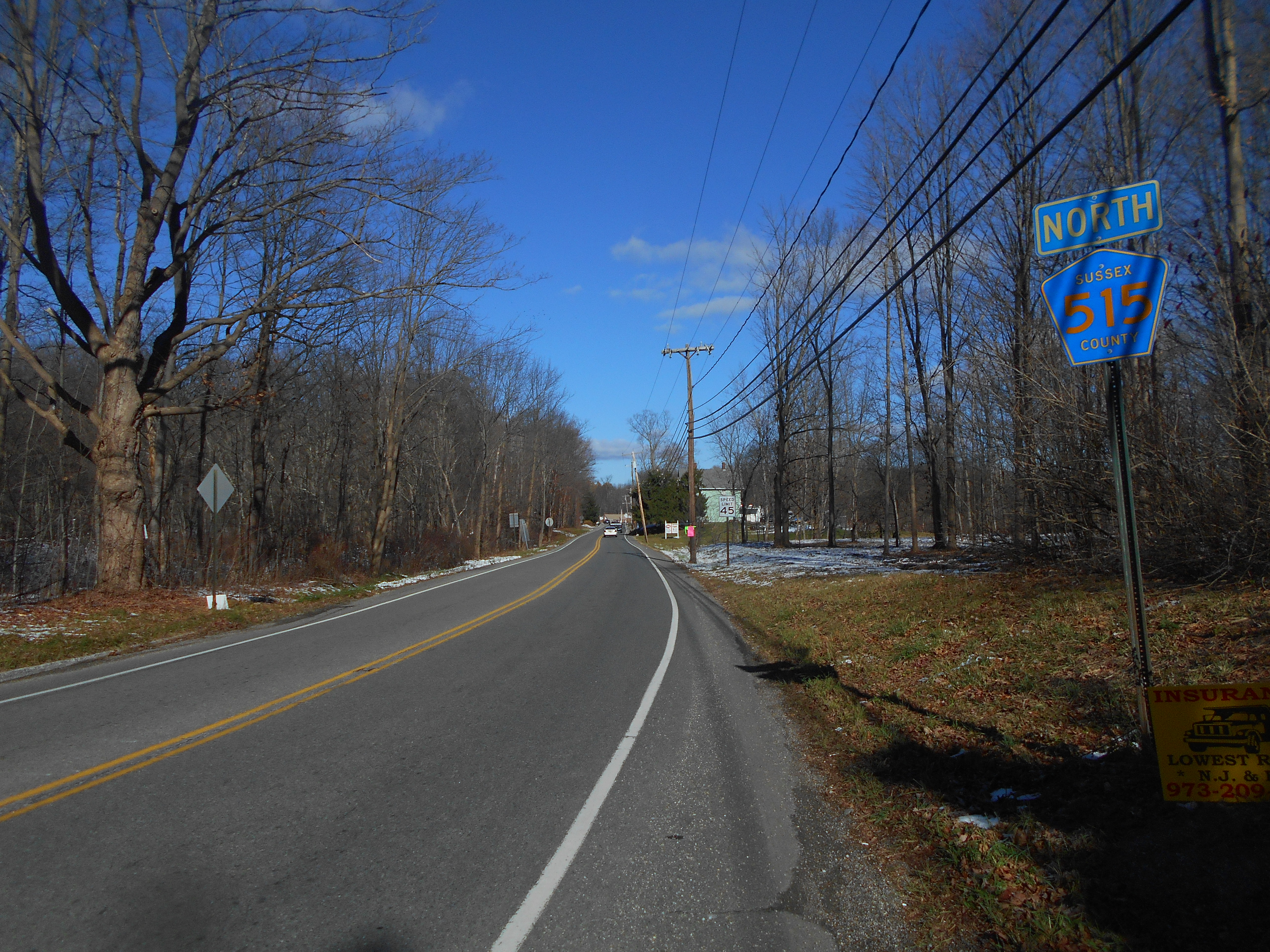
CR 515 northbound after Route 23 in Stockholm

CR 515 comes to an intersection with Route 94, at which point it forms a concurrency with that route. The two routes continue northeast on Vernon Warwick Road, passing more wooded areas of development before running near farms. After crossing the Appalachian Trail, CR 515 splits from Route 94 by heading north on Prices Switch Road. The road crosses the New York, Susquehanna and Western Railway again as it continues through a mix of farmland and woodland with some residences. CR 515 ends at the New York state line, with Prices Switch Road continuing into that state as a local road.

== Major intersections ==
The entire route is in Sussex County.

Location	mi	km	Destinations	Notes
Hardyston Township	0.0	0.0	Route 23 – Sussex, Wayne	Southern terminus
Vernon Township	8.5	13.7	Route 94 south – McAfee	Southern end of Route 94 concurrency
Vernon Township	12.2	19.6	Route 94 north – NY State	Northern end of Route 94 concurrency
Vernon Township	13.0	20.9	Prices Switch Road	Continuation into New York
1.000 mi = 1.609 km; 1.000 km = 0.621 mi: Concurrency terminus
