= Ryan Izzo =

American football player (born 1995)

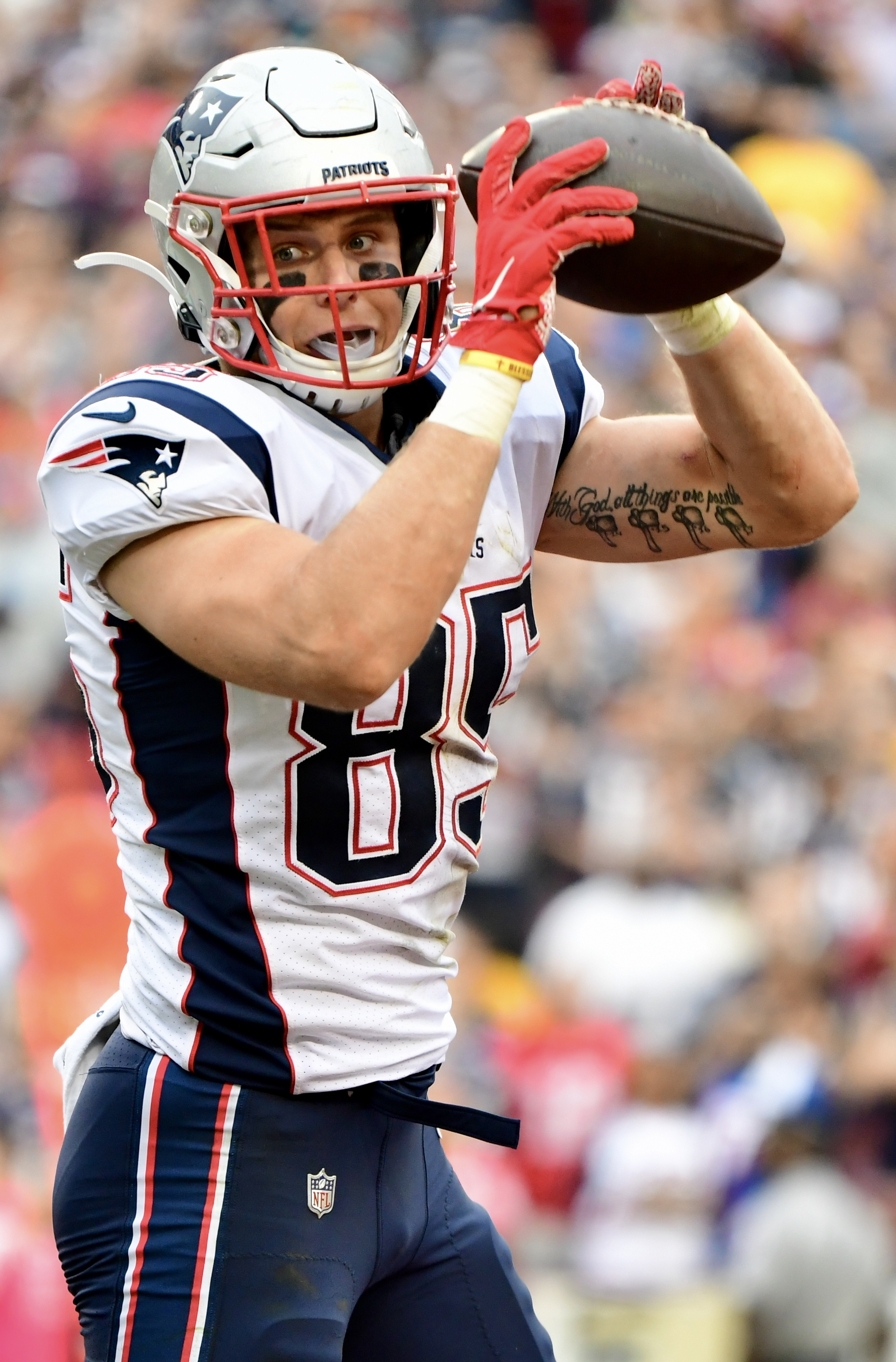
- Izzo with the New England Patriots in 2019

Profile
- Position: Tight end

Personal information
- Born: December 21, 1995 (age 30); Highland Lakes, New Jersey, U.S.
- Listed height: 6 ft 5 in (1.96 m)
- Listed weight: 255 lb (116 kg)

Career information
- High school: Pope John XXIII Regional (Sparta, New Jersey)
- College: Florida State (2014–2017)
- NFL draft: 2018: 7th round, 250th overall pick

Career history
- New England Patriots (2018–2020); Houston Texans (2021)*; New York Giants (2021)*; Seattle Seahawks (2021)*; Tennessee Titans (2021); Carolina Panthers (2022)*; Philadelphia Stars (2023); Houston Roughnecks (2024)*; Memphis Showboats (2025)
- * Offseason or practice squad member only

Awards and highlights
- Super Bowl champion (LIII)

Career NFL statistics
- Receptions: 19
- Receiving yards: 313
- Receiving touchdowns: 1
- Stats at Pro Football Reference

Ryan Anthony Izzo (born December 21, 1995) is an American professional football tight end. He played college football at Florida State, and was selected by the New England Patriots in the 2018 NFL draft.

== Early life ==
Izzo grew up in the Highland Lakes section of Vernon Township, New Jersey, and attended Pope John XXIII Regional High School in Sparta, New Jersey. Izzo began his high school career at Vernon Township High School, where he anticipated playing tight end but ended up playing quarterback. He transferred to football powerhouse Pope John to play tight end.

Initially, he drew little attention from NCAA Division I football programs until Virginia Tech expressed interest and 20 other schools followed thereafter before he graduated in 2014. As a senior, he tallied 766 receiving yards and seven touchdowns. Along with football, he also played basketball. Izzo committed to play college football for the Florida State Seminoles on September 23, 2013.

== College career ==
As a redshirt freshman in 2015, Izzo played in all 13 of Florida State's games, catching 14 passes for 210 yards and two touchdowns. He also rushed for 146 yards and one touchdown on 12 attempts.

In 2016, Izzo once again played in all 13 games, catching 19 passes for 227 yards, tallying one touchdown.

Prior to the 2017 season, Izzo was named to the John Mackey Award watch list. As a redshirt junior, he played and started in all 13 games for Florida State, having 19 receptions for 306 yards and three touchdowns.

After the season, Izzo declared for the 2018 NFL draft.

== Professional career ==
Pre-draft measurables
Height	Weight	Arm length	Hand span	40-yard dash	10-yard split	20-yard split	20-yard shuttle	Three-cone drill	Vertical jump	Broad jump	Bench press
6 ft 4 5/8 in (1.95 m)	256 lb (116 kg)	32 1/8 in (0.82 m)	9 in (0.23 m)	4.86 s	1.70 s	2.89 s	4.43 s	7.15 s	33.0 in (0.84 m)	9 ft 2 in (2.79 m)	18 reps
All values from NFL Combine/Pro Day

=== New England Patriots ===
Izzo was selected by the New England Patriots in the seventh round (250th overall) of the 2018 NFL draft. On September 2, 2018, he was placed on injured reserve.

He made his NFL debut and had a three-yard reception in the Patriots' 2019 season-opening 33–3 victory over the Pittsburgh Steelers. Izzo became the 73rd different player to catch a touchdown pass from Tom Brady, scoring on a 10-yard play in the Patriots' week 5 33–7 victory over the Washington Redskins. Izzo missed multiple games in 2019 because of illness and various injuries including a concussion.

Izzo entered the 2020 season as the Patriots starting tight end. He started the first 12 games before being placed on injured reserve on December 10, 2020.

=== Houston Texans ===
On March 18, 2021, Izzo was traded to the Houston Texans for a seventh round pick in the 2022 NFL draft. He was waived on August 31, 2021.

=== New York Giants ===
On September 3, 2021, Izzo signed with the practice squad of the New York Giants. On September 21, 2021, Izzo was released from the practice squad.

=== Seattle Seahawks ===
On September 29, 2021, Izzo was signed to the Seattle Seahawks practice squad.

=== Tennessee Titans ===
On January 5, 2022, Izzo was signed by the Tennessee Titans off the Seahawks practice squad. He was released on June 1, 2022.

=== Carolina Panthers ===
On August 11, 2022, Izzo signed with the Carolina Panthers. He was waived on August 17, 2022.

=== Philadelphia Stars ===
On January 5, 2023, Izzo signed with the Philadelphia Stars of the United States Football League (USFL). The Stars folded when the XFL and USFL merged to create the United Football League (UFL).

=== Houston Roughnecks ===
On January 5, 2024, Izzo was selected by the Houston Roughnecks during the 2024 UFL dispersal draft. He was released on March 10, 2024.

=== Memphis Showboats ===
On November 18, 2024, Izzo signed with the Memphis Showboats of the United Football League (UFL). He was released on April 16, 2025.

== Personal life ==
Izzo married his longtime girlfriend Talia Cappuccio on March 15th 2025 in Palm Coast Florida. Izzo is the eldest of two siblings Evan and Ethan.
