= Highland Lakes, New Jersey =

Populated place in Sussex County, New Jersey, US

- Census-designated place
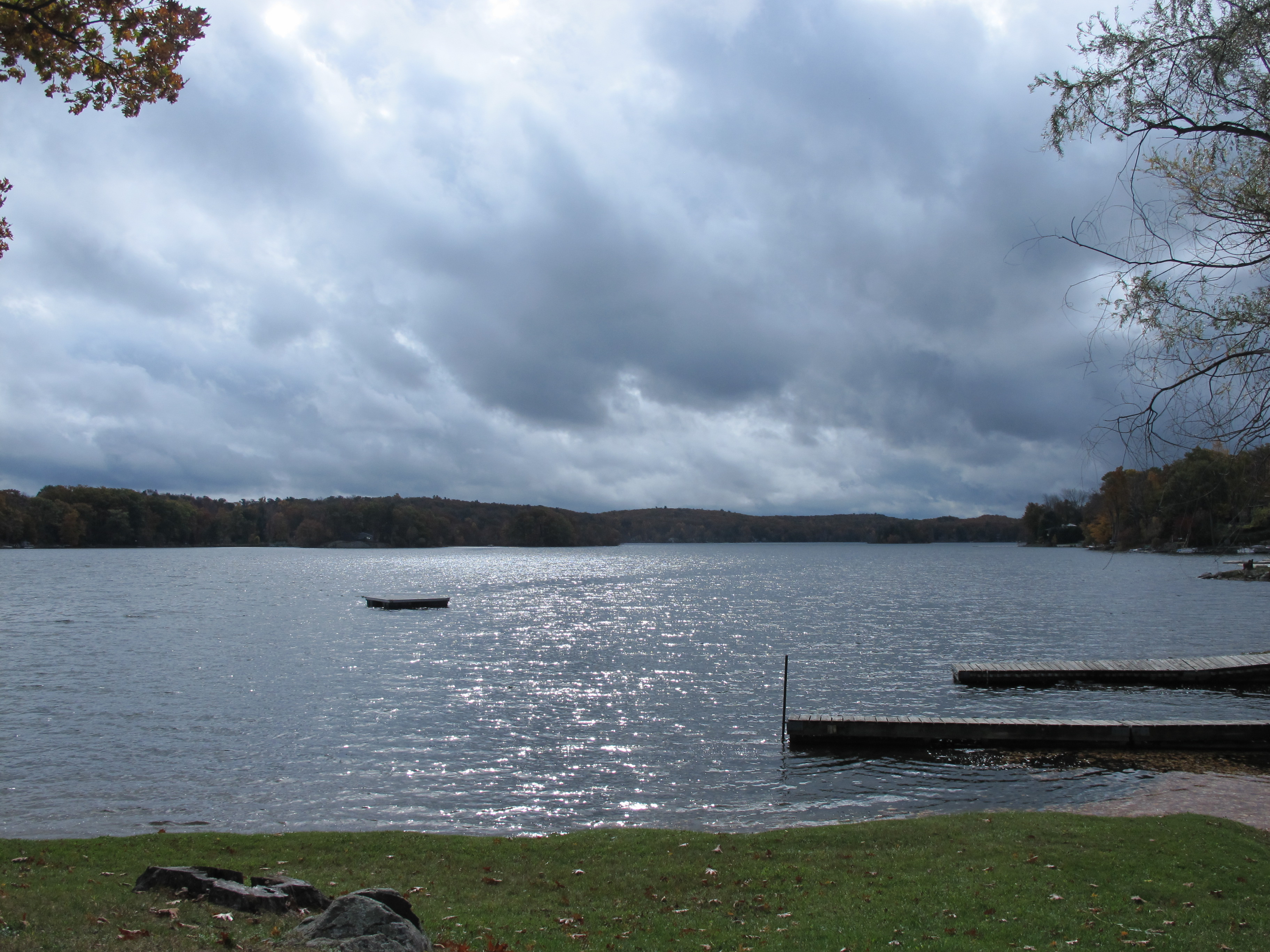
- Namesake of the community, Highland Lake

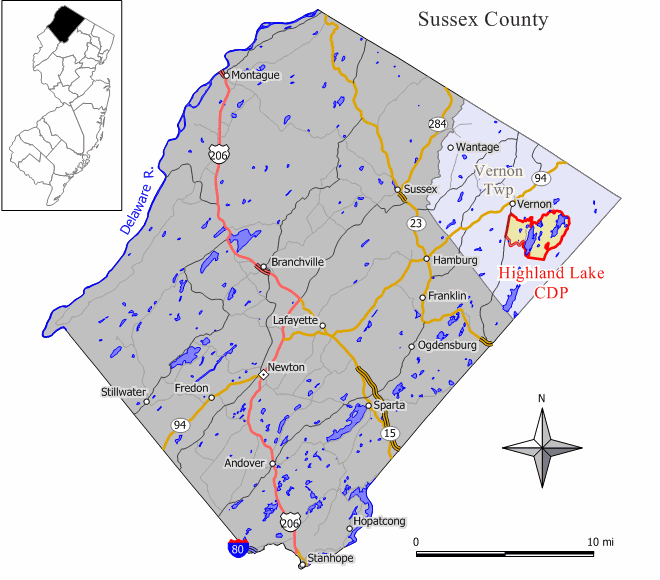
- Map of Highland Lakes in Sussex County. Inset: Location of Sussex County highlighted in the state of New Jersey

- Location in Sussex County Location in New Jersey Location in the United States
- Coordinates: 41.174024°N 74.455183°W
- Country: United States
- State: New Jersey
- County: Sussex
- Township: Vernon

Area
  - Total: 4.98 sq mi (12.91 km^{2})
  - Land: 4.32 sq mi (11.19 km^{2})
  - Water: 0.66 sq mi (1.71 km^{2}) 16.86%
- Elevation: 1,276 ft (389 m)

Population (2020)
  - Total: 4,816
  - Density: 1,114.2/sq mi (430.19/km^{2})
- Time zone: UTC−05:00 (Eastern (EST))
  - Summer (DST): UTC−04:00 (Eastern (EDT))
- ZIP Code: 07422
- Area code: 973 Exchange: 764
- FIPS code: 34-31405
- GNIS feature ID: 02389926

Highland Lakes is an unincorporated community and census-designated place (CDP) located within Vernon Township, in Sussex County, in the U.S. state of New Jersey. As of the 2020 census, Highland Lakes had a population of 4,816. Highland Lakes has its own Post Office with the ZIP Code 07422.

== History ==
The community was mistakenly referred to as Highland Lake (missing the plural "s") by the United States Census Bureau from the 1990 to 2010 censuses

== Geography ==
According to the United States Census Bureau, the CDP had a total area of 6.099 square miles (15.80 km^{2}), including 5.071 square miles (13.13 km^{2}) of land and 1.028 square miles (2.66 km^{2}) of water (16.86%).

== Demographics ==
Historical population
Census	Pop.	Note	%±
1980	2,888		—
1990	4,550		57.5%
2000	5,051		11.0%
2010	4,933		−2.3%
2020	4,816		−2.4%
Population sources: 1950 1960 1970; 1980 1990 2000; 2010 2020

Highland Lakes first appeared as a census designated place in the 1980 U.S. census.

=== Racial and ethnic composition ===
Highland Lakes CDP, New Jersey – Racial and ethnic composition Note: the US Census treats Hispanic/Latino as an ethnic category. This table excludes Latinos from the racial categories and assigns them to a separate category. Hispanics/Latinos may be of any race.
Race / Ethnicity (NH = Non-Hispanic)	Pop 2000	Pop 2010	Pop 2020	% 2000	% 2010	% 2020
White alone (NH)	4,721	4,516	4,149	93.47%	91.55%	86.15%
Black or African American alone (NH)	50	45	58	0.99%	0.91%	1.20%
Native American or Alaska Native alone (NH)	3	8	14	0.06%	0.16%	0.29%
Asian alone (NH)	24	21	21	0.48%	0.43%	0.44%
Native Hawaiian or Pacific Islander alone (NH)	0	2	0	0.00%	0.04%	0.00%
Other race alone (NH)	6	4	13	0.12%	0.08%	0.27%
Mixed race or Multiracial (NH)	36	42	161	0.71%	0.85%	3.34%
Hispanic or Latino (any race)	211	295	400	4.18%	5.98%	8.31%
Total	5,051	4,933	4,816	100.00%	100.00%	100.00%

=== 2020 census ===
As of the 2020 census, Highland Lakes had a population of 4,816. The median age was 43.8 years. 20.0% of residents were under the age of 18 and 16.0% of residents were 65 years of age or older. For every 100 females there were 99.7 males, and for every 100 females age 18 and over there were 101.3 males age 18 and over.

96.1% of residents lived in urban areas, while 3.9% lived in rural areas.

There were 1,941 households in Highland Lakes, of which 28.9% had children under the age of 18 living in them. Of all households, 56.4% were married-couple households, 16.4% were households with a male householder and no spouse or partner present, and 19.6% were households with a female householder and no spouse or partner present. About 22.4% of all households were made up of individuals and 8.7% had someone living alone who was 65 years of age or older.

There were 2,415 housing units, of which 19.6% were vacant. The homeowner vacancy rate was 3.1% and the rental vacancy rate was 6.6%.

=== 2010 census ===
The 2010 United States census counted 4,933 people, 1,875 households, and 1,388 families in the CDP. The population density was 972.8 people per square mile (375.6 people/km^{2}). There were 2,342 housing units at an average density of 461.9 units per square mile (178.3 units/km^{2}). The racial makeup was 96.55% (4,763) White, 1.09% (54) Black or African American, 0.26% (13) Native American, 0.43% (21) Asian, 0.04% (2) Pacific Islander, 0.63% (31) from other races, and 0.99% (49) from two or more races. Hispanic or Latino of any race were 5.98% (295) of the population.

Of the 1,875 households, 33.2% had children under the age of 18; 61.8% were married couples living together; 8.6% had a female householder with no husband present and 26.0% were non-families. Of all households, 21.0% were made up of individuals and 5.3% had someone living alone who was 65 years of age or older. The average household size was 2.63 and the average family size was 3.07.

22.4% of the population were under the age of 18, 8.4% from 18 to 24, 25.9% from 25 to 44, 34.8% from 45 to 64, and 8.5% who were 65 years of age or older. The median age was 41.1 years. For every 100 females, the population had 102.2 males. For every 100 females ages 18 and older there were 99.8 males.

=== 2000 census ===
As of the 2000 United States census there were 5,051 people, 1,794 households, and 1,375 families residing in the CDP. The population density was 386.9 people/km^{2} (1,002 people/mi^{2}). There were 2,283 housing units at an average density of 174.9 units/km^{2} (453 units/mi^{2}). The racial makeup of the CDP was 94.88% White, 2.09% African American, 0.08% Native American, 0.48% Asian, 1.23% from other races, and 1.05% from two or more races. Hispanic or Latino of any race were 5.53% of the population.

There were 1,794 households, out of which 42.8% had children under the age of 18 living with them, 65.7% were married couples living together, 7.9% had a female householder with no husband present, and 23.3% were non-families. 18.1% of all households were made up of individuals, and 5.0% had someone living alone who was 65 years of age or older. The average household size was 2.82 and the average family size was 3.24.

In the CDP the population was spread out, with 29.4% under the age of 18, 6.2% from 18 to 24, 34.3% from 25 to 44, 22.0% from 45 to 64, and 8.1% who were 65 years of age or older. The median age was 36 years. For every 100 females, there were 99.9 males. For every 100 females age 18 and over, there were 97.9 males.

The median income for a household in the CDP was $77,968, and the median income for a family was $87,313. Males had a median income of $58,395 versus $39,968 for females. The per capita income for the CDP was $27,445. About 2.6% of families and 3.5% of the population were below the poverty line, including 4.4% of those under age 18 and 3.3% of those age 65 or over.

== Location and surroundings ==
Located in northern New Jersey's Sussex County, Highland Lakes is a private lake community that focuses on outdoor activities. The area, once rolling dairy farm hillsides, was developed in the 1930s as a summer retreat for families in the New York City Metropolitan area. Most of the homes are lake-style or log cabins, retaining most of the architecture of the original community. Many of what were once summer homes, are now the full-time residences of homeowners in Highland Lakes. Highland Lakes is made up of five lakes (Highland Lake, East Highland Lake, Upper Highland Lake, Upper West Highland Lake, and Upper East Highland Lake) that between them have seven beaches. Highland Lakes is governed by a private association that manages all property and access to recreational facilities, which include the lakes, beaches, playgrounds, tennis and basketball courts and clubhouse. All property owners pay an initiation fee and annual dues to the Highland Lakes Country Club and Community Association. Highland Lakes is located adjacent to the 34,350-acre (13,900 ha) Wawayanda State Park and near the Pequannock Watershed, which is a large parcel owned by the City of Newark in Essex County for their water supply.

== Notable people ==
People who were born in, residents of, or otherwise closely associated with Highland Lakes include:

- Nicolas de Gunzburg
- Ryan Izzo (born 1995), tight end for the Houston Roughnecks.
