= Nolan Kasper =

American alpine skier

Personal information
- Born: March 27, 1989 (age 37) Morristown, New Jersey, United States
- Height: 5 ft 8 in (173 cm)
- Website: Nolan Kasper blog

Skiing career
- Sport: Alpine skiing
- Club: Burke Mountain Academy
- Disciplines: Slalom, giant slalom, Super combined
- World Cup debut: November 15, 2009 (age 20)

Olympics
- Teams: 3 (2010)2014, 2018
- Medals: 0

World Championships
- Teams: 1 – (2011)
- Medals: 0

World Cup
- Seasons: 3rd – (2010–12)
- Wins: 0
- Podiums: 1 – (1 SL)
- Overall titles: 0 – (48th in 2011)
- Discipline titles: 0 – (17th in SL, 2011)
Medal record
Men's alpine skiing
Representing the United States
Junior World Ski Championships
Bronze medal – third place	2009 Garmisch	Slalom

Nolan Kasper (born March 27, 1989) is a former World Cup alpine ski racer from the United States. He competes in the technical events and specializes in the slalom.

Born in Morristown, New Jersey, New Jersey, Kasper began skiing at age three at Hidden Valley ski area in northern New Jersey, where his father was a ski instructor. He lived in Montville, New Jersey, and moved with his family to Vernon Township, New Jersey, so that his father could be closer to the local ski areas. Kasper is a graduate of the Burke Mountain Academy in Vermont and attends Dartmouth College in the off-season.

Kasper made his World Cup debut in November 2009 and was named for the 2010 U.S. Olympic team shortly after; he placed 24th in the Olympic slalom at Whistler. The following year, Kasper finished 15th in the slalom at the 2011 World Championships in Garmisch, Germany.

Kasper's best result to date is his first World Cup podium, a tie for second in the slalom at Kranjska Gora in March 2011. He finished in 17th place in the World Cup slalom standings for the 2011 season. After hip surgery in September 2011, Kasper was off the snow until November. Despite the lack of training time, he just missed a podium with a fourth place in the slalom in early December at Beaver Creek, Colorado.

== World Cup top-ten finishes ==
- 1 podium – (1 SL)

Season	Date	Location	Race	Place
2011	Feb 27, 2011	Bansko, Bulgaria	Slalom	10th
2011	Mar 6, 2011	Kranjska Gora, Slovenia	Slalom	2nd
2012	Dec 8, 2011	Beaver Creek, USA	Slalom	4th
2012	Jan 8, 2012	Adelboden, Switzerland	Slalom	9th
2012	Feb 19, 2012	Bansko, Bulgaria	Slalom	6th

== Video ==
- Universal Sports.com – Nolan Kasper – Adelboden, Switzerland – slalom: runs 1 & 2 – 2012-01-08
