= Vernon Township, New Jersey =

Township in Sussex County, New Jersey, US

- Township
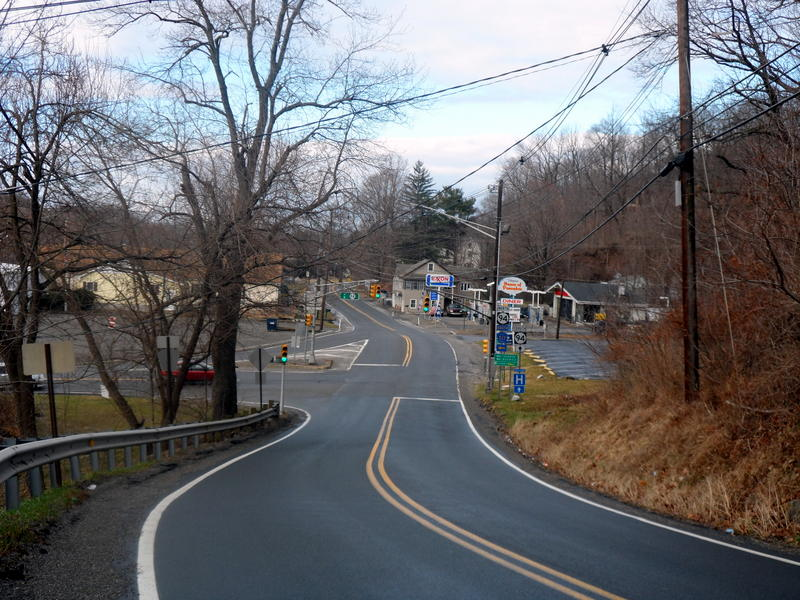
- Along CR 517 and Route 94

- Seal

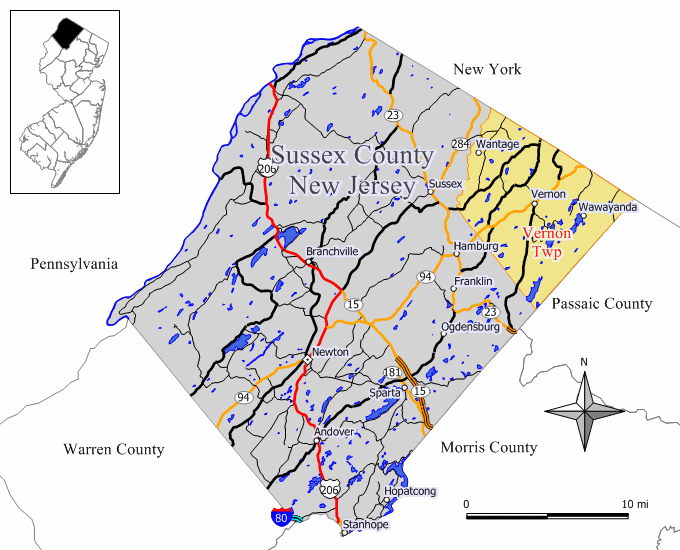
- Map of Vernon Township in Sussex County. Inset: Location of Sussex County highlighted in the State of New Jersey.

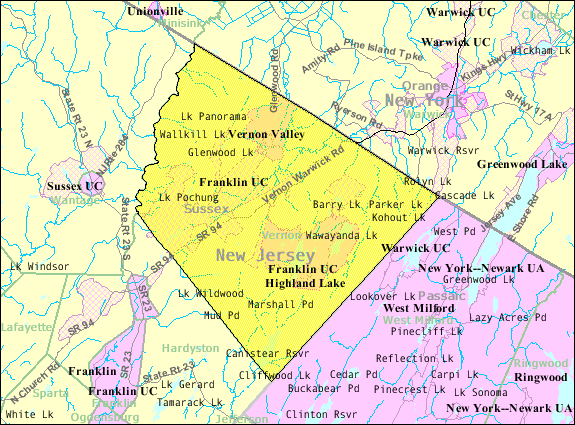
- Census Bureau map of Vernon Township, New Jersey

- Location in Sussex County Location in New Jersey Location in the United States
- Coordinates: 41.195198°N 74.488755°W
- Country: United States
- State: New Jersey
- County: Sussex
- Established: April 8, 1793
- Incorporated: February 21, 1798

Government
  - Type: Faulkner Act (mayor–council)
  - Body: Township Council
  - Mayor: Anthony Rossi (term ends December 31, 2027)
  - Administrator: Vacant
  - Municipal clerk: Marcy Gianattasio

Area
  - Total: 69.96 sq mi (181.19 km^{2})
  - Land: 67.59 sq mi (175.07 km^{2})
  - Water: 2.36 sq mi (6.12 km^{2}) 3.38%
  - Rank: 15th of 565 in state 1st of 24 in county
- Elevation: 571 ft (174 m)

Population (2020)
  - Total: 22,358
  - Estimate (2023): 22,711
  - Rank: 124th of 565 in state 1st of 24 in county
  - Density: 330.8/sq mi (127.7/km^{2})
  - Rank: 469th of 565 in state 12th of 24 in county
- Time zone: UTC−05:00 (Eastern (EST))
  - Summer (DST): UTC−04:00 (Eastern (EDT))
- ZIP Code: 07462 (Vernon); 07422 (Highland Lakes); 07418 (Glenwood); 07428 (McAfee)
- Area code: 973
- FIPS code: 3403775740
- GNIS feature ID: 0882258
- Website: www.vernontwp.com

Vernon Township is a township in Sussex County, in the U.S. state of New Jersey. It is located about a one-hour drive from New York City and is part of the New York metropolitan area. As of the 2020 United States census, the township's population was 22,358, a decrease of 1,585 (−6.6%) from the 2010 census count of 23,943, which in turn reflected a decline of 743 (−3.0%) from the 24,686 counted in the 2000 census. It is both the most populous municipality and the largest in area in the county.

Vernon is home to Mountain Creek (formerly Great Gorge and Vernon Valley), a ski resort and water park as well as the Crystal Springs Resort's Minerals Hotel and Elements Spa. The Hidden Valley ski resort, which opened in 1976 and occupied a 140-acre (57 ha) property that included one of New Jersey's three remaining downhill skiing facilities, closed at the end of the 2013 season and could find no buyers at an auction held that year; it has since reopened as the National Winter Activity Center. The Great Gorge Playboy Club was located in the Vernon community of McAfee, but was sold and turned into a hotel called the Legends Resort & Country Club. Opened in 1972 at a cost of $20 million (equivalent to $153.9 million in 2025), featuring 700 rooms and 27 holes of golf, the hotel was sold to Americana in 1982 and later was resold to Metairie Corp. which branded the property as the Legends Resort and Country Club. In 2017, the township started eviction proceedings against low-income residents who had been living in the defunct resort on a permanent basis.

== History ==
The independent township of Vernon was established on April 8, 1793, from portions of Hardyston Township, and the township was formally incorporated on February 21, 1798. The 68 square miles (180 km^{2}) which marked the town's borders over 200 years ago have not changed since. However, the population of Vernon, which was 1,548 people as recently as 1950, has steadily grown since the 1960s, when the ski industry was introduced to the area. Additional growth has come as home prices have soared in the inner suburbs of New York City and property buyers seek the better values available from real estate developments in the area.

Iron mining in the town of Vernon was prevalent during the mid-to-late 19th century. Mines such as the Canistear Mine, Williams Mine, and the Pochuk Mine created industry which spawned local businesses, and brought rail travel to the town.

It is not known how Vernon Township got its name, but a number of theories have been offered by author Ronald J. Dupont Jr.:

- Admiral Edward Vernon. Dupont writes that this is very possible because of two things: 1. the township was created in 1792, the year that George Washington was reelected as president, and 2. because Vernon Township's first Masonic Lodge in 1820 was named Mount Vernon (Washington was also a Freemason during his life), likely after Washington's Virginia residence. The residence, in turn, got its name because Washington's brother Lawrence Washington served with Admiral Vernon.
- A family named Vernon. Not likely, Dupont says, although he notes that a Nathaniel Vernon was a licensed tavernkeeper in Sussex County in 1756. However, the tavern was likely elsewhere, and not in what is now Vernon.
- The Latin root "Vernus." One form of "vernus" is "vernal", as in vernal equinox ("spring"), and so Vernon "had connotations of spring: green, lush, fresh, fertile, etc., and hence was an attractive name for a place."

Dupont Jr. also writes that in the late 19th century two places named Vernon existed, one in Sussex County and another in Essex County. When the Essex County community was granted a post office, they found out that another Vernon existed, and so they eventually named the community Verona.

== Geography ==
According to the United States Census Bureau, the township had a total area of 69.96 square miles (181.19 km^{2}), including 67.60 square miles (175.07 km^{2}) of land and 2.36 square miles (6.12 km^{2}) of water (3.38%).

Highland Lakes (2020 Census population of 4,816), Upper Greenwood Lake (3,687), Vernon Center (1,743), and Vernon Valley (1,491) are unincorporated communities and census-designated places (CDPs) located entirely or partially within Vernon Township.

The township is bordered by the municipalities of Hardyston Township and Wantage Township in Sussex County; West Milford in Passaic County; and Warwick in Orange County.

Elevation varies greatly due to the valleys, rolling hills, and mountains. The United States Geological Survey places Glenwood at 580 feet (180 m), McAfee at 435 feet (133 m), and Highland Lakes at 1,260 feet (380 m).

The township is located in the Kittatinny Valley which is a section of the Great Appalachian Valley that stretches 700 miles (1,100 km) from Canada to Alabama.

The City of Newark in Essex County owns 5,400 acres (2,200 ha) of land in the township that are part of their Pequannock River Watershed, which provides water to the city from a total area of 35,000 acres (14,000 ha) that also includes portions of Hardyston Township, Jefferson Township, Kinnelon, Rockaway Township and West Milford.

=== Communities and neighborhoods ===
Other unincorporated communities, localities and place names located partially or completely within the township include:

- Barry Lakes
- Canistear Reservoir
- Cedar Ridge
- Cliffwood Lake
- DeKays
- Glenwood
- Great Gorge
- High Breeze
- Highland Lakes
- Independence Corners
- Kampe P.O.
- Lake Conway
- Lake Panorama
- Lake Pochung
- Lake Wanda
- Lake Wallkill
- Lake Wilderwood
- Maple Grange
- McAfee
- Mud Pond
- Owens
- Pleasant Valley Lake
- Prices Switch
- Scenic Lake
- Vernon Village "Town Center"
- Vernon Valley a.k.a. "The Valley"
- Vernon Valley Lake
- Wawayanda
- Wawayanda Lake

Glenwood and McAfee are located in the western portion of the township, McAfee to the South and Glenwood to the North. Highland Lakes is in the Eastern portion of the township. Pleasant Valley Lake is in the southwest portion of the township. Four of these sections have a post office. Vernon also has many developments.

Vernon is home to many lake communities, including Highland Lakes, Barry Lakes, Cliffwood Lake, High Breeze, Lake Conway, Lake Wanda, Laurel Lake, Lake Wildwood, Lake Panorama, Lake Pochung, Lake Wallkill, Pleasant Valley Lake, Scenic Lakes, and Vernon Valley Lake.

The township's largest housing complex is Great Gorge Village. Originally built as a slope-side vacation housing development with 1,356 units, the village is no longer affiliated with the ski resort and is operated by real estate investor Andrew Mulvihill. Village residents, who pay $5.5 million in condominium fees to cover services, have argued that Mulvihill and affiliated businesses have used their control of the community's board of directors to direct contracts to affiliated vendors.

== Demographics ==
Historical population
Census	Pop.	Note	%±
1810	1,708		—
1820	2,096		22.7%
1830	2,380		13.5%
1840	2,395		0.6%
1850	2,649		10.6%
1860	2,190		−17.3%
1870	1,979		−9.6%
1880	1,811		−8.5%
1890	1,756		−3.0%
1900	1,738		−1.0%
1910	1,675		−3.6%
1920	1,433		−14.4%
1930	1,279		−10.7%
1940	1,407		10.0%
1950	1,548		10.0%
1960	2,155		39.2%
1970	6,059		181.2%
1980	16,302		169.1%
1990	21,211		30.1%
2000	24,686		16.4%
2010	23,943		−3.0%
2020	22,358		−6.6%
2023 (est.)	22,711		1.6%
Population sources: 1810–1920 1840 1850–1870; 1850 1870 1880–1890; 1890–1910 1910–1930; 1940–2000 2000; 2010 2020

=== 2010 census ===
The 2010 United States census counted 23,943 people, 8,622 households, and 6,596 families in the township. The population density was 350.9 per square mile (135.5/km^{2}). There were 10,958 housing units at an average density of 160.6 per square mile (62.0/km^{2}). The racial makeup was 95.18% (22,790) White, 1.39% (332) Black or African American, 0.17% (40) Native American, 0.78% (186) Asian, 0.03% (8) Pacific Islander, 1.10% (263) from other races, and 1.35% (324) from two or more races. Hispanic or Latino of any race were 6.41% (1,534) of the population.

Of the 8,622 households, 35.6% had children under the age of 18; 63.0% were married couples living together; 9.0% had a female householder with no husband present and 23.5% were non-families. Of all households, 19.0% were made up of individuals and 4.8% had someone living alone who was 65 years of age or older. The average household size was 2.77 and the average family size was 3.18.

24.3% of the population were under the age of 18, 8.7% from 18 to 24, 24.5% from 25 to 44, 34.0% from 45 to 64, and 8.4% who were 65 years of age or older. The median age was 40.5 years. For every 100 females, the population had 102.9 males. For every 100 females ages 18 and older there were 101.2 males.

The Census Bureau's 2006–2010 American Community Survey showed that (in 2010 inflation-adjusted dollars) median household income was $81,129 (with a margin of error of +/− $5,949) and the median family income was $87,215 (+/− $4,152). Males had a median income of $62,462 (+/− $3,163) versus $41,917 (+/− $2,121) for females. The per capita income for the borough was $32,649 (+/− $1,365). About 3.2% of families and 4.1% of the population were below the poverty line, including 6.4% of those under age 18 and 2.5% of those age 65 or over.

=== 2000 census ===
As of the 2000 United States census there were 24,686 people, 8,368 households, and 6,610 families residing in the township. The population density was 360.9 inhabitants per square mile (139.3/km^{2}). There were 9,994 housing units at an average density of 146.1 per square mile (56.4/km^{2}). The racial makeup of the township was 96.56% White, 0.76% African American, 0.09% Native American, 0.70% Asian, 0.03% Pacific Islander, 0.79% from other races, and 1.07% from two or more races. Hispanic or Latino of any race were 3.60% of the population.

There were 8,368 households, out of which 45.0% had children under the age of 18 living with them, 68.1% were married couples living together, 7.6% had a female householder with no husband present, and 21.0% were non-families. 16.2% of all households were made up of individuals, and 3.8% had someone living alone who was 65 years of age or older. The average household size was 2.95 and the average family size was 3.35.

In the township the population was spread out, with 30.6% under the age of 18, 6.7% from 18 to 24, 32.9% from 25 to 44, 23.4% from 45 to 64, and 6.3% who were 65 years of age or older. The median age was 35 years. For every 100 females, there were 102.7 males. For every 100 females age 18 and over, there were 100.0 males.

The median income for a household in the township was $67,566, and the median income for a family was $72,609. Males had a median income of $50,084 versus $33,292 for females. The per capita income for the township was $25,250. About 2.8% of families and 2.9% of the population were below the poverty line, including 3.0% of those under age 18 and 3.9% of those age 65 or over.

== Economy ==
The primary satellite uplink earth terminal facility for Sirius XM Radio is located in Vernon, as is the Vernon Valley uplink facility for SES Worldcom.

== Parks and recreation ==
- Appalachian National Scenic Trail
- Mountain Creek Ski Resort and Mountain Creek Waterpark
- Hidden Valley Resort – Since January 2016, the area has been repurposed as the National Winter Activity Center, which provides education and ski / snowboard instruction to groups that might not have access to winter sports.

== Government ==
=== Local government ===
In a November 2010 referendum, 70% of voters approved a change from the Faulkner Act (council–manager) form of government to the mayor–council form. Under the new plan, a mayor directly elected by the voters oversees the day-to-day operation of the township with the aid of a business manager, subject to the oversight of a five-member Township Council. The Mayor and Council took office after elections in May 2011, replacing the previously existing council. The township is one of 42 municipalities (of the 564) statewide that use this form of government. Under the terms of an ordinance passed in August 2011, the township's elections were shifted from May to November, with the council citing savings from eliminating the standalone municipal election.

The governing body is comprised of the Mayor and the five-member Township Council, who are directly elected by the voters on an at-large basis to staggered four-year terms of office on a non-partisan basis, with either two or three seats up for election in odd-numbered years as part of the November general election. Three council seats come up for election together and the two other council seats and the mayoral seat are up for vote together two years later. Under the current plan, Vernon has a "strong mayor" system of government in which the mayor heads the executive branch, overseeing township functions, enforcing all ordinances and other regulations, appoints department heads and prepares a budget, with the assistance of a business administrator. The Township Council is the legislative branch, responsible for enacting ordinances, approving the mayor's department head appointments, can remove employees for cause and can modify the mayor's budget by majority vote, though budget increases require a two-thirds majority. The mayor has the option to attend and speak at council meetings but is not given a vote.

As of 2026, the Mayor is Anthony L. Rossi, whose term of office ends December 31, 2027. Members of the Vernon Township Council are Council President William J. Higgins (2028), Council Vice President Sandra Ooms (2030), Patrick Rizzuto (2030), Bradley Sparta (2028), and Carl Contino (2030), who is the youngest official to serve on the Council.

In February 2023, Peg Distasi was appointed to the seat expiring in December 2025 that had been held by Bryan Lynch; the seat will come up for election in November 2023 for the balance of the term. In the November 2023 general election, Jessica DeBenedetto was elected to serve the balance of the term of office.

In November 2022, the council appointed Joe Tadrick to fill the seat expiring in December 2023 that had been held by Harry Shortway the previous month due to health issues.

In October 2021, the Township Council selected Michael Furrey to fill the seat expiring in December 2023 that had been held by Kelly Weller until she stepped down from office earlier that month after announcing that she was moving out of the township. Furrey served on an interim basis until the November 2022 general election, when Bradley D. Sparta was elected to serve the balance of the term of office.

The Township Council selected Toni Cilli in January 2021 to fill the seat held by Jean Murphy running to December 2021.

Andrew Pitsker took office in July 2020 after being chosen to fill the seat expiring in December 2021 that had been held until Mark Van Tassel left office the previous month. Pitsker served on an interim basis until the November 2020 general election, when he was elected to serve the remainder of the term.

Four members of the governing body were elected in May 2011 and took office on July 1, 2011, Jean Murphy was elected in November 2014 just beating Edward Dunn.

==== Emergency services ====
Vernon Township is serviced by the Vernon Police Department, one ambulance squad and four fire departments. All of the emergency services are made up of volunteers, except for the police department.

Vernon Fire Department covers a significant portion of "the Valley", Highland Lakes Fire Department covers "the mountain", McAfee Fire Department covers the Pleasant Valley Lake area and Pochuck Valley covers most of the Glenwood section.

Since 2024, Vernon Emergency Medical Services (formed from the merger of the Vernon Township Ambulance Squad and the Glenwood Pochuck Volunteer Ambulance Corps) is split between three stations buildings situated to best serve the township.

=== Federal, state and county representation ===
Vernon Township is located in the 5th Congressional District and is part of New Jersey's 24th state legislative district.

For the 119th United States Congress, New Jersey's 5th congressional district is represented by Josh Gottheimer (D, Wyckoff). New Jersey is represented in the United States Senate by Democrats Cory Booker (Newark, term ends 2027) and Andy Kim (Moorestown, term ends 2031).

For the 2026–2027 session, the 24th legislative district of the New Jersey Legislature is represented in the State Senate by Parker Space (R, Wantage Township) and in the General Assembly by Dawn Fantasia (R, Franklin) and Mike Inganamort (R, Chester Township).

Sussex County is governed by a Board of County Commissioners whose five members are elected at-large in partisan elections on a staggered basis, with either one or two seats coming up for election each year. At an annual reorganization meeting held in the beginning of January, the board selects a Commissioner Director and Deputy Director from among its members, with day-to-day supervision of the operation of the county delegated to a County Administrator. As of 2025, Sussex County's Commissioners are Director Jill Space (R, Wantage Township, 2025), Deputy Director Chris Carney (R, Frankford Township, 2027), Jack DeGroot (R, Sussex, 2026), William Hayden (I, Branchville, 2025) and Alan Henderson (R, Lafayette Township, 2027).

Constitutional officers elected on a countywide basis are Clerk Jeffrey M. Parrott (R, Wantage Township, 2026), Sheriff Michael F. Strada (R, Hampton Township, 2025) and Surrogate Gary R. Chiusano (R, Frankford Township, 2028).

=== Politics ===
As of March 2011, there were a total of 15,476 registered voters in Vernon Township, of which 2,425 (15.7% vs. 16.5% countywide) were registered as Democrats, 5,489 (35.5% vs. 39.3%) were registered as Republicans and 7,538 (48.7% vs. 44.1%) were registered as Unaffiliated. There were 24 voters registered as Libertarians or Greens. Among the township's 2010 Census population, 64.6% (vs. 65.8% in Sussex County) were registered to vote, including 85.4% of those ages 18 and over (vs. 86.5% countywide).

Gubernatorial election results for Vernon Township
Year	Republican		Democratic		Third party(ies)	
Year	No.	%	No.	%	No.	%
2025	5,636	58.60%	3,928	40.84%	54	0.56%
2021	5,457	66.74%	2,604	31.85%	116	1.42%
2017	3,732	56.20%	2,546	38.34%	362	5.45%
2013	4,445	69.00%	1,740	27.01%	257	3.99%
2009	4,441	59.99%	2,106	28.45%	856	11.56%
2005	3,396	55.57%	2,394	39.18%	321	5.25%

In the 2012 presidential election, Republican Mitt Romney received 6,111 votes (56.8% vs. 59.4% countywide), ahead of Democrat Barack Obama with 4,322 votes (40.2% vs. 38.2%) and other candidates with 281 votes (2.6% vs. 2.1%), among the 10,753 ballots cast by the township's 15,729 registered voters, for a turnout of 68.4% (vs. 68.3% in Sussex County). In the 2008 presidential election, Republican John McCain received 6,778 votes (58.3% vs. 59.2% countywide), ahead of Democrat Barack Obama with 4,603 votes (39.6% vs. 38.7%) and other candidates with 184 votes (1.6% vs. 1.5%), among the 11,620 ballots cast by the township's 15,195 registered voters, for a turnout of 76.5% (vs. 76.9% in Sussex County). In the 2004 presidential election, Republican George W. Bush received 6,826 votes (62.4% vs. 63.9% countywide), ahead of Democrat John Kerry with 3,921 votes (35.8% vs. 34.4%) and other candidates with 149 votes (1.4% vs. 1.3%), among the 10,939 ballots cast by the township's 14,249 registered voters, for a turnout of 76.8% (vs. 77.7% in the whole county).

United States presidential election results for Vernon Township 2024 2020 2016 2012 2008 2004
Year	Republican		Democratic		Third party(ies)	
Year	No.	%	No.	%	No.	%
2024	8,123	62.60%	4,650	35.84%	203	1.56%
2020	8,084	59.50%	5,203	38.30%	299	2.20%
2016	7,283	63.95%	3,536	31.05%	570	5.00%
2012	6,111	57.04%	4,322	40.34%	281	2.62%
2008	6,778	58.61%	4,603	39.80%	184	1.59%
2004	6,826	62.65%	3,921	35.99%	149	1.37%

In the 2013 gubernatorial election, Republican Chris Christie received 69.0% of the vote (4,445 cast), ahead of Democrat Barbara Buono with 27.0% (1,740 votes), and other candidates with 4.0% (257 votes), among the 6,498 ballots cast by the township's 15,896 registered voters (56 ballots were spoiled), for a turnout of 40.9%. In the 2009 gubernatorial election, Republican Chris Christie received 4,441 votes (59.5% vs. 63.3% countywide), ahead of Democrat Jon Corzine with 2,106 votes (28.2% vs. 25.7%), Independent Chris Daggett with 732 votes (9.8% vs. 9.1%) and other candidates with 124 votes (1.7% vs. 1.3%), among the 7,458 ballots cast by the township's 15,109 registered voters, yielding a 49.4% turnout (vs. 52.3% in the county).

United States Senate election results for Vernon Township1
Year	Republican		Democratic		Third party(ies)	
Year	No.	%	No.	%	No.	%
2024	7,701	61.16%	4,514	35.85%	376	2.99%
2018	5,605	61.06%	3,060	33.34%	514	5.60%
2012	5,689	54.55%	4,204	40.31%	536	5.14%
2006	3,627	58.81%	2,269	36.79%	271	4.39%

United States Senate election results for Vernon Township2
Year	Republican		Democratic		Third party(ies)	
Year	No.	%	No.	%	No.	%
2020	7,733	58.08%	5,138	38.59%	444	3.33%
2014	3,156	59.99%	1,938	36.84%	167	3.17%
2013	2,531	63.28%	1,420	35.50%	49	1.23%
2008	6,290	56.10%	4,404	39.28%	518	4.62%

== Education ==
The Vernon Township School District serves public school students in pre-kindergarten through twelfth grade. As of the 2023–24 school year, the district, comprised of six schools, had an enrollment of 2,941 students and 236.0 classroom teachers (on an FTE basis), for a student–teacher ratio of 12.5:1. Schools in the district (with 2023–24 enrollment data from the National Center for Education Statistics) are Walnut Ridge School with 89 students in PreK, Cedar Mountain Primary School with 424 students in grades K–1, Rolling Hills Primary School with 406 students in grades 2–3, Lounsberry Hollow School with 428 students in grades 4–5, Glen Meadow Middle School with 640 students in grades 6–8 and Vernon Township High School with 912 students in grades 9–12.

== Transportation ==
=== Roads and highways ===
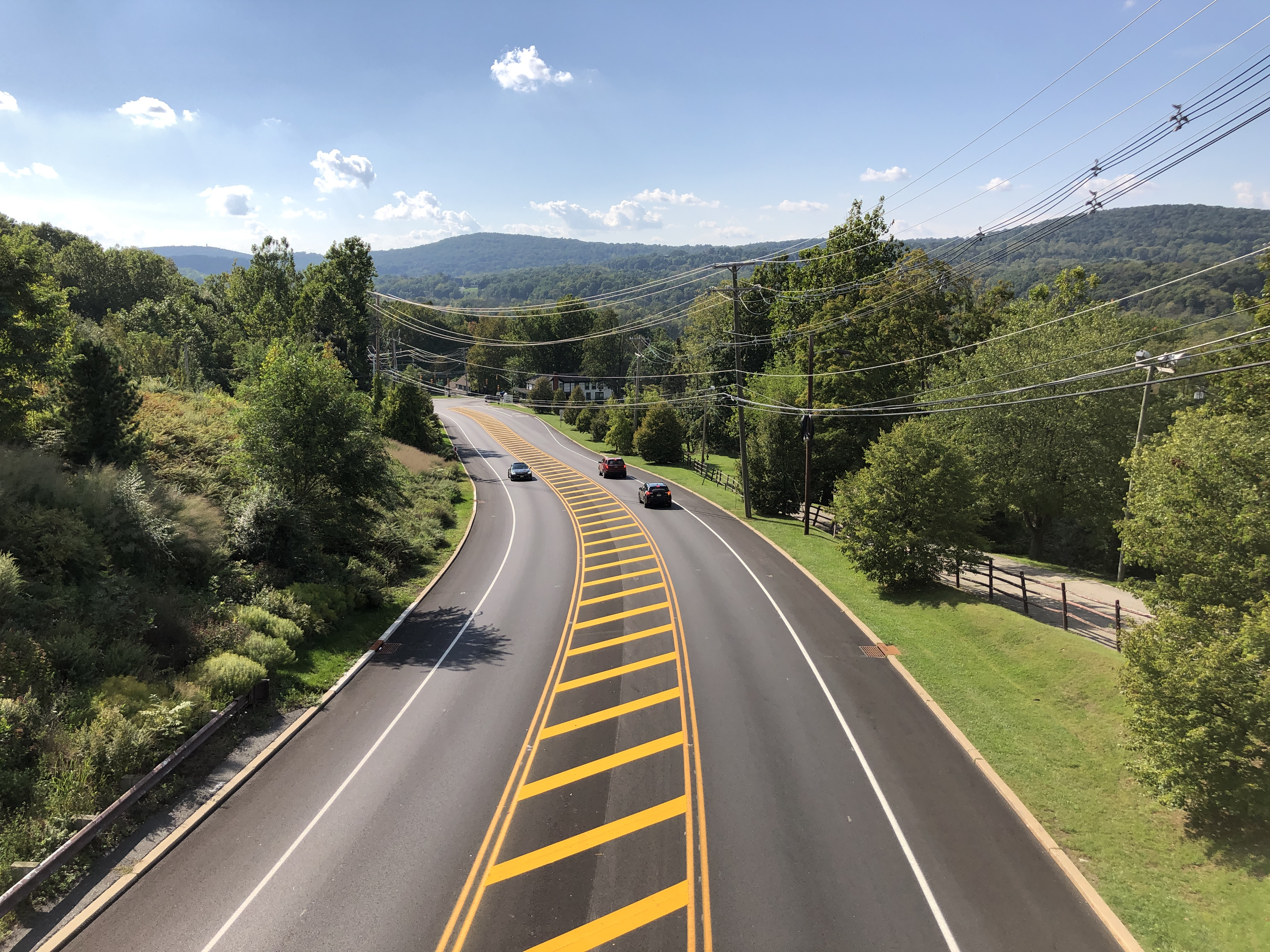
Route 94 southbound in Vernon Township

As of May 2010, the township had a total of 126.12 miles (202.97 km) of roadways, of which 85.21 miles (137.13 km) were maintained by the municipality, 32.31 miles (52.00 km) by Sussex County and 8.60 miles (13.84 km) by the New Jersey Department of Transportation.

The main highway serving Vernon Township is Route 94. Other significant roads passing through Vernon Township include County Route 515, County Route 517 and County Route 565. County Route 644 and County Route 641 also pass through the township. In addition, direct access to Interstate 80 is offered via Route 94 and County Route 565 to Route 23 to Interstate 84 in New York.

Vernon is the site of a wrong-way concurrency at the intersection of Route 94 and County Route 517 in McAfee.

=== Public transportation ===
The New York, Susquehanna and Western Railway passes through Vernon, but only freight service is offered.

== In popular culture ==
- Portions of the 1989 film See No Evil, Hear No Evil were filmed and shot at the former Playboy Club, referred to as simply the "Great Gorge Resort" in the movie.
- In 2020, the former Action Park was preserved through its legacy in two memoir adaptations. On June 30, Penguin Random House published the book Action Park by Andy Mulvihill and Jake Rossen, and two months later, HBO Max released the documentary film Class Action Park about the life, times and dangers of the former Action Park.

== Notable people ==
People who were born in, residents of, or otherwise closely associated with Vernon Township include:

- Rebekah Bruesehoff (born 2007), LGBTQ rights activist, social media influencer, and author
- Bobby Ellsworth (born 1959), lead singer of thrash metal band Overkill
- Helena Rutherfurd Ely (1858–1920), author, garden writer and creator of Vernon's Meadowburn Farm
- Nicolas de Gunzburg (1904–1981), editor in chief of Town & Country and fashion editor at Vogue and Harper's Bazaar
- Daniel Haines (1801–1877), attorney, jurist, and politician who served as the 14th Governor of New Jersey in nonconsecutive terms in office from 1843 to 1845 and 1848 to 1851.
- Brett Hearn (born 1958), modified stock car driver
- Katie Henry, blues rock singer, guitarist, pianist and songwriter
- Ryan Izzo (born 1995), football tight end for the Houston Roughnecks
- Nolan Kasper (born 1989), former World Cup alpine ski racer
- Danny Kass (born 1982), professional snowboarder who won a silver medal in men's halfpipe in Snowboarding at the 2002 Winter Olympics
- Brad Leone (born 1985), chef for Bon Appétit star of show It's Alive
- Patty Paine (born 1965), poet, author and scholar
- John Winans (1831–1907), U.S. Representative from Wisconsin
- Ross Winans (1796–1877), inventor, mechanic and builder of locomotives and railroad machinery
