= McAfee, New Jersey =

Populated place in Sussex County, New Jersey, US

- Unincorporated community
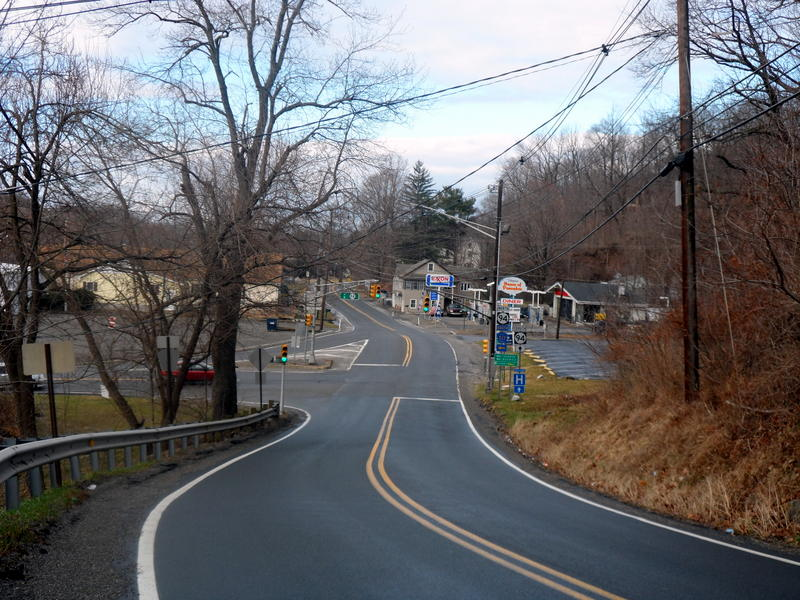
- Routes 94 and 517

- McAfee's location in Sussex County (Inset: Sussex County in New Jersey) McAfee, New Jersey (New Jersey) McAfee, New Jersey (the United States)
- Coordinates: 41°10′42″N 74°32′26″W
- Country: United States
- State: New Jersey
- County: Sussex
- Township: Vernon
- Elevation: 436 ft (133 m)
- ZIP Code: 07428
- Area code: 973
- GNIS feature ID: 0878209

McAfee is an unincorporated community located within Vernon Township in Sussex County, in the U.S. state of New Jersey. The area is served as United States Postal Service ZIP Code 07428.

As of the 2000 United States census, the population for ZIP Code Tabulation Area 07428 was 127.

== History ==
McAfee was originally called West Vernon in the 19th century. Located at the intersection of Route 94 and the McAfee-Greens Corner Road (CR 517), the area was first settled in the mid-18th century. The village grew and had its first school in 1805, with more businesses locating here over the years. On December 28, 1868, a post office was established, at which time the name of the village was changed to McAfee Valley, in order to eliminate any confusion with the Vernon Post Office. The name was taken from Samuel McAfee, a blacksmith who practiced his vocation here until 1840, when he relocated out of state. The Sussex Railroad extended its line to McAfee in 1871, primarily to transport the iron and limestone being mined there. At that time, McAfee Valley had one hotel, a small store, the post office, and a few dwellings. Ten years later, however, the village boasted a shoe shop, a wheelwright shop, a harness shop, a cooper shop, two railroad depots, a grade school, a hotel, the post office, and the quarrying operation run by the White Rock Lime and Cement Company. On November 17, 1924, the word Valley was dropped from the name of the village, leaving the community known simply as McAfee.

== Sources ==
- McCabe, Wayne T. Sussex County... A Gazetteer, Newton, New Jersey, Historic Preservation Alternatives, Inc., 2009.
