= List of landforms in Sussex County, New Jersey =

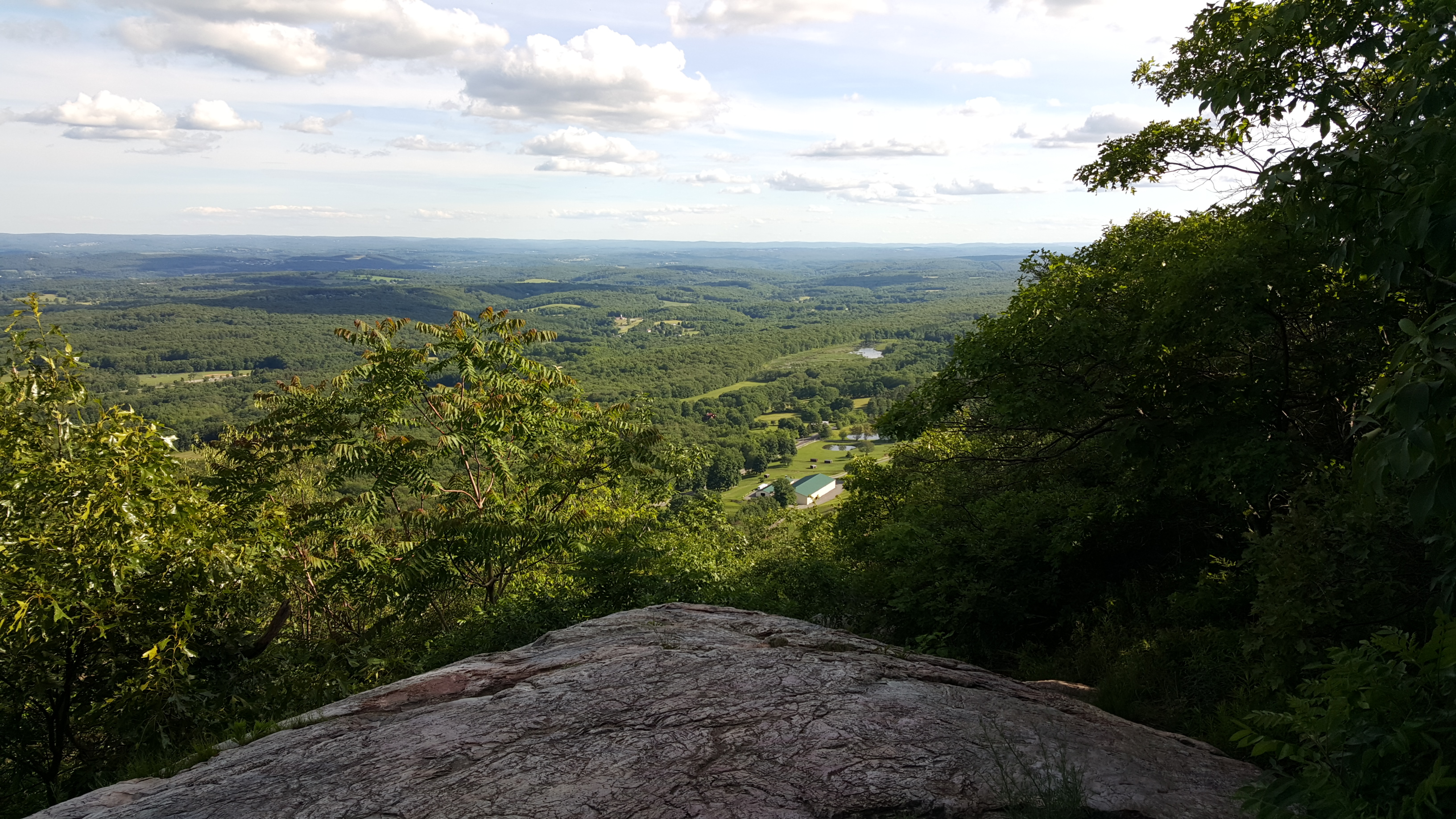
Kittatinny Valley seen from the Sunrise Mountain look-out on Kittatinny Mountain

The following is a list of landforms and other geographical features located within the political boundaries of Sussex County in northwestern New Jersey in the United States.

== Mountains and hills ==
=== Ridge and Valley Appalachians physiographic province ===
- Kittatinny Mountain
  - Culver Ridge
  - High Point (New Jersey)
  - Bird Mountain (New Jersey)
  - Blue Mountain (New Jersey)
  - Rattlesnake Mountain (New Jersey)
  - Sunrise Mountain (New Jersey)
  - Paradise Mountain (New Jersey)
- Wallpack Ridge

=== Highlands physiographic province ===
- Allamuchy Mountain
- Cage Hill
- Hamburg Mountains (New Jersey)
- Wawayanda Mountain
- Lookout Mountain (New Jersey)
- Maple Hill (New Jersey)
- Pimple Hills
- Pochuck Mountain
- Rutan Hill
- Smiths Hill
- Sparta Mountains
- Sterling Hill (New Jersey)

=== Valleys ===
- Kittatinny Valley
- Wallkill Valley
- Wallpack Valley

== Rivers and streams ==
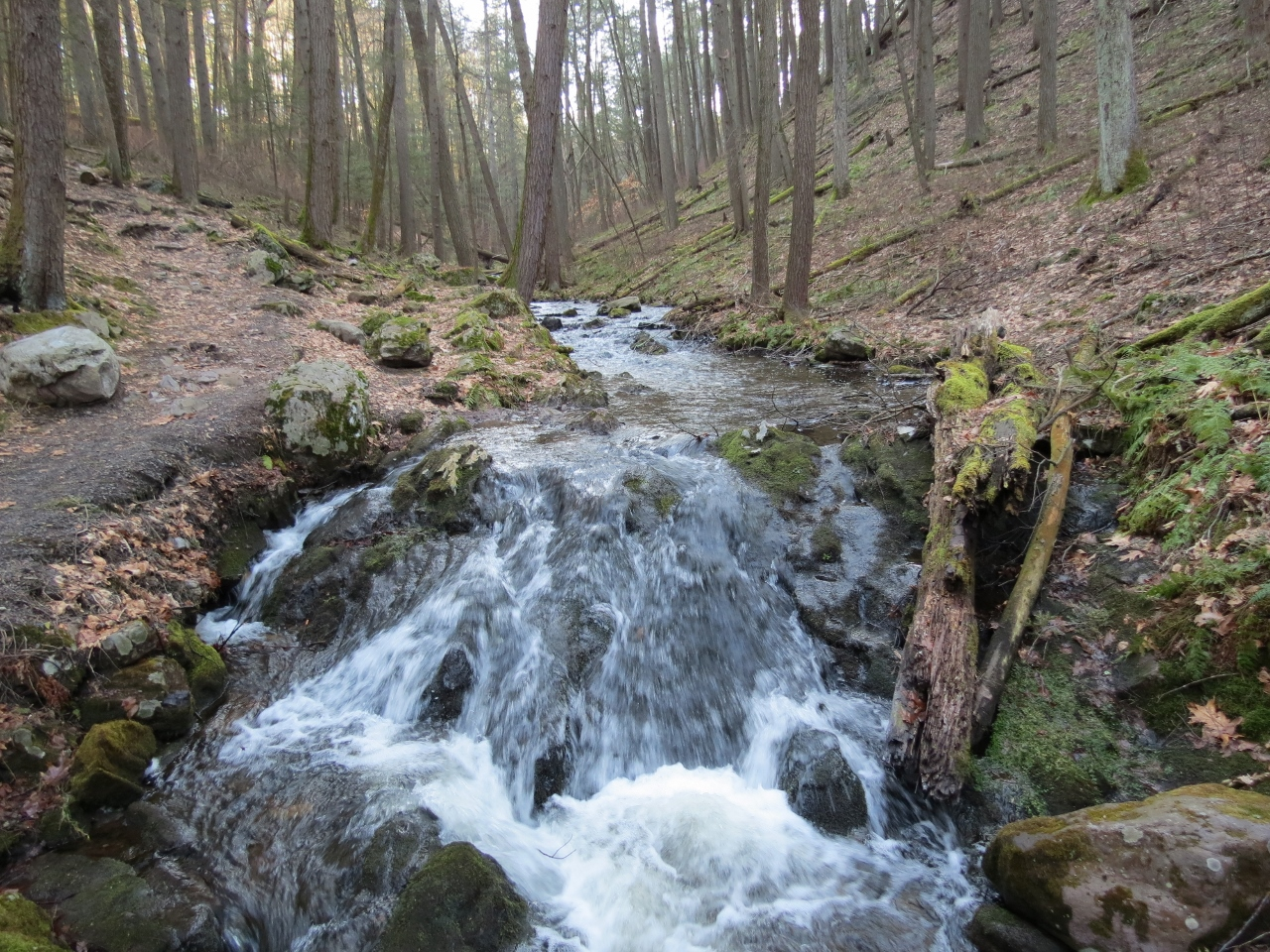
Tillmans Ravine and Brook, Walpack Township

- Wallkill River
  - Papakating Creek
    - West Branch Papakating Creek
    - Neepaulakating Creek
    - Clove Brook
- Pequannock River
- Pequest River
- Pochuck Creek
  - Black Creek (New Jersey)
  - Wawayanda Creek
- Delaware River
  - Flat Brook
    - Tillmans Brook
    - Big Flat Brook
    - Little Flat Brook
  - Paulins Kill
    - Dry Brook
    - Culver Brook (West Branch Paulins Kill)
    - Nelden Brook
  - Musconetcong River
    - Lubbers Run
    - Punkhorn Creek

== Lakes and ponds ==
- Brau Kettle
- Culver's Lake
- Lake Hopatcong
- Lake Lackawanna
- Lake Mohawk
- Lake Musconetcong
- Lake Owassa
- Muckshaw Ponds

== See also ==
- Sussex County Snow Belt

== Protected areas ==
- Delaware Water Gap National Recreation Area
- High Point State Park
- Stokes State Forest
- Swartswood State Park
- Kittatinny Valley State Park
- Wawayanda State Park
- Wallkill River National Wildlife Refuge
