= Wawayanda =

Wawayanda may refer to:

- Wawayanda, New York, a town in Orange County
- Wawayanda Creek, in Sussex County, New Jersey
- Wawayanda Mountain, in Sussex County, New Jersey
- Wawayanda Patent, an early land grant in the Hudson valley
- Wawayanda State Park, in Sussex and Passaic Counties, New Jersey
