= Hamburg Mountains (New Jersey) =

Mountain range in the United States

- Wallkill Mountains

Highest point
- Elevation: 1,473 ft (449 m) NGVD 29

Geography
- Country: United States
- State: New Jersey
- Counties: Sussex
- Range coordinates: 41°09.08′N 74°30.51′W
- Parent range: New York–New Jersey Highlands; New England province; Appalachian Highlands
- Borders on: Vernon Valley, Stockholm Pass and Wawayanda Mountain
- Topo map: USGS Hamburg
- Biome: Eastern Temperate Forests (Level I); Northern Forests (Level II); Northeastern Highlands (Level III)

Geology
- Orogeny: Grenville orogeny
- Rock ages: Mesoproterozoic era and Stenian period
- Rock types: Crystalline metamorphic rock and gneiss

The Hamburg Mountains are a range of the New York-New Jersey Highlands region of the Appalachian Mountains. The summit, reaching a height of 1,473 feet (449 m), lies within Sussex County, New Jersey.

== Geography ==
The Hamburg Mountains and Wawayanda Mountain on the east, and Pochuck Mountain to the west, form the borders of the Vernon Valley, an important farming and mining area of New Jersey drained by Pochuck Creek.

== Geology ==
The Hamburg Mountains are part of the Reading Prong of the New England Upland subprovince of the New England province of the Appalachian Highlands. The rocks that form the Hamburg Mountains are comprised from the same belt that make up other mountains nearby. This belt, i.e. the Reading Prong, consists of ancient crystalline metamorphic rocks. The New England province as a whole, along with the Blue Ridge province further south, are often together referred to as the Crystalline Appalachians.

The Crystalline Appalachians extend as far north as the Green Mountains of Vermont and as far south as the Blue Ridge Mountains, although a portion of the belt remains below the Earth's surface through part of Pennsylvania. The Crystalline Appalachians are distinct from the parallel Sedimentary Appalachians which run from Georgia to New York. The nearby Kittatinny Mountains are representative of these sedimentary formations.

== History ==
An 1834 description read,

Hamburg, or Wallkill Mountains, a local name given to the chain of hills on the South mountain, extending northeast across the townships of Byram and Hardiston, and interlocking with Wawayanda and Pochuck mountain, in Vernon township, about 25 miles in length.
