= Pochuck =

Pochuck may refer to:

- Pochuck Creek, a tributary of the Wallkill River in Sussex County, New Jersey
- Pochuck Mountain, a ridge in the New York-New Jersey Highlands region of the Appalachian Mountains
