= Maple Hill =

Maple Hill may refer to:

== Populated places ==
- Maple Hill, Iowa
- Maple Hill, Kansas
- Maple Hill, North Carolina
- Maple Hill, Ontario (disambiguation), Canada
- Maple Hill, Wisconsin

== Natural formations ==
- Maple Hill (New Jersey)
- Maple Hill (New York)

== Other uses ==
- Maple Hill Cemetery (disambiguation)
- Maple Hill Pavilion
