= Paradise Valley =

Paradise Valley may refer to:

== Places ==
=== Canada ===
- Paradise Valley, Alberta, a village in Central Alberta
- Paradise Valley (Alberta), a valley in Kananaskis Country, western Alberta
- Paradise Valley in Banff National Park, Canada
- Paradise Valley, British Columbia, a rural community near Brackendale/Squamish, British Columbia

=== United States ===
- Paradise Valley (Montana), a river valley in Park County, Montana
- Paradise Valley, Arizona, a town and suburb of Phoenix, Arizona
- Paradise Valley, Detroit, a neighborhood in Detroit, Michigan
- Paradise Valley, Nevada, a census-designated place in Humboldt County, Nevada
- Paradise Valley, Pennsylvania, an unincorporated community in Monroe County, Pennsylvania
- Paradise Valley, Phoenix, a neighborhood in Phoenix, Arizona
- Paradise Valley, California, includes Anza, California

=== Other ===
- Paradise Valley, Morocco
- Paradise Valley Nature Reserve, between Pinetown and Westville, South Africa

== Fictional places ==
- Paradise Valley, the setting for the TV series The Secret World of Alex Mack

== Other ==
- Paradise Valley (film), a 1934 American western film
- Paradise Valley (album), a 2013 album by John Mayer

== See also ==
- Paradise Mountain (disambiguation)
