= Bird Mountain =

Bird Mountain, or similar, may refer to:

- Bird Mountain (New Jersey), U.S., a peak of the Kittatinny Mountains
- Bird Mountain, Morgan County, Tennessee, U.S.
- Bird Mountain, Taconic Mountains, Vermont, U.S.
- Bird Mountain, Indian Heaven Wilderness, Washington, U.S.

== See also ==
- Fuglefjellet ('Bird mountain'), Queen Maud Land, Antarctica
- Tututepec ('Bird mountain'), Villa de Tututepec de Melchor Ocampo, Mexico
- Jabal al-Tair Island ('Bird Mountain Island'), Yemen
- Mount Bird, Antarctica
- Byrd Mountains, Antarctica
- Akira Toriyama, mangaka, creator of Dragon Ball, who refers to himself as bird since Toriyama (鳥山) means "Bird Mountain".
