= Vernon Valley =

Vernon Valley may refer to:

- Vernon Valley, New Jersey
- Vernon Valley, former name and current neighborhood of Northport, New York
- Vernon Valley, former name for part of Mountain Creek ski resort
