= Sterling Hill (New Jersey) =

Highest point
- Elevation: 833 ft (254 m) NGVD 29
- Coordinates: 41°04′56″N 74°36′34″W

Geography
- Location: Sussex County, New Jersey, U.S.
- Parent range: Pimple Hills
- Topo map: USGS Franklin

Climbing
- Easiest route: Hike

Sterling Hill is a mountain in Sussex County, New Jersey. The peak rises to 833 feet (254 m), and overlooks the Wallkill River and Ogdensburg to the southeast. It is part of the Pimple Hills.

== Name ==
The mountain derives its name from Lord Stirling, who owned the land in the eighteenth century, on which he operated a zinc mine.

== See also ==
- Sterling Hill Mining Museum
