= Pochuck Mountain =

Mountain in the Appalachian Mountains, United States

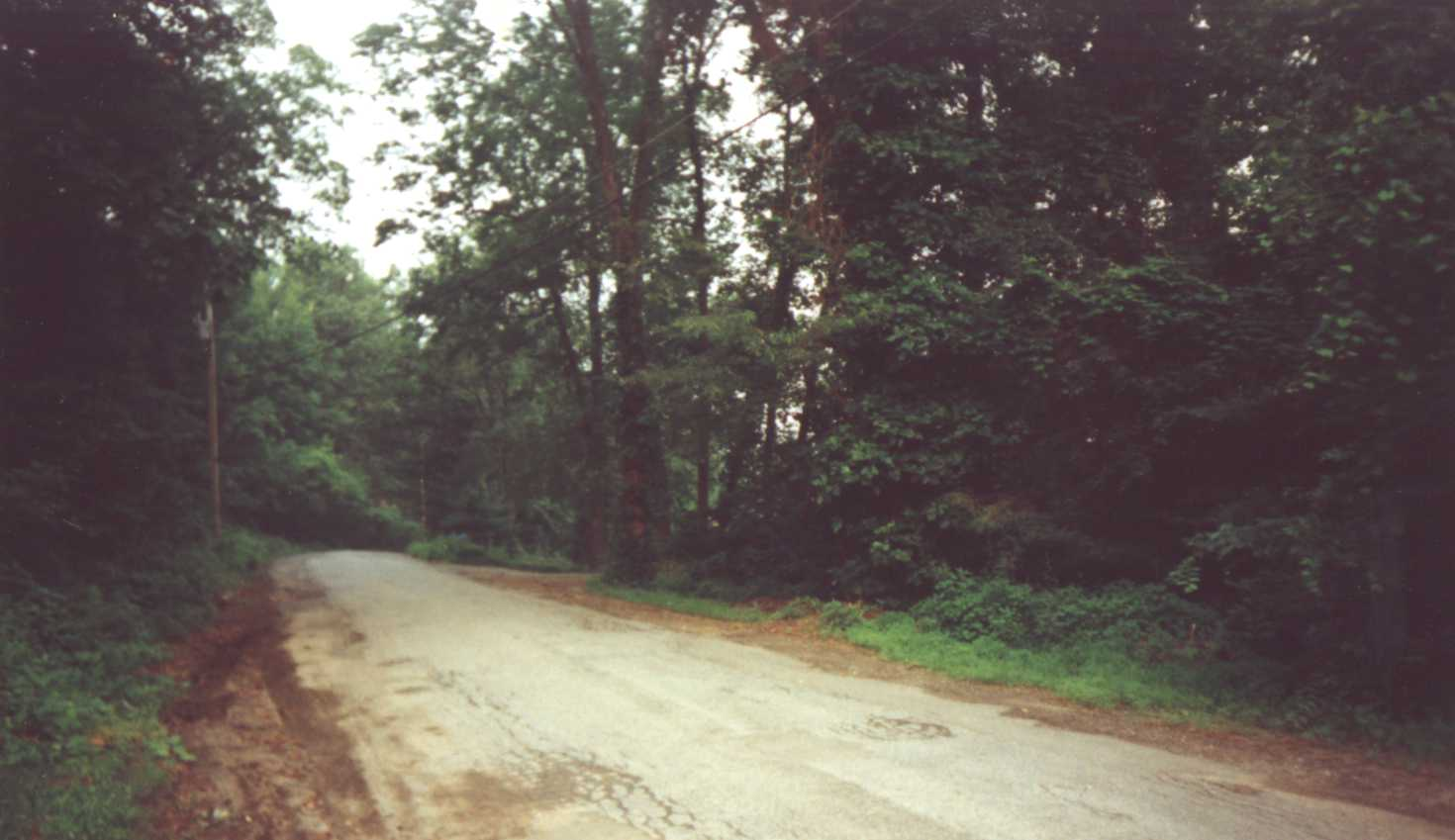
- White Birch Road within the Scenic Lakes community leading down one of the southwestern peaks of Pochuck Mountain.

Highest point
- Elevation: 1,194 ft (364 m)
- Prominence: 695 ft (212 m)
- Coordinates: 41°12′40″N 74°31′50″W

Geography
- Location: Sussex County, New Jersey / Orange County, New York, U.S.
- Parent range: Appalachian Mountains
- Topo map: USGS Pochuck Mountain

Pochuck Mountain is a ridge in the New York-New Jersey Highlands region of the Appalachian Mountains. Pochuck Mountain's summit and most of its peaks lie within Vernon Township, Sussex County, New Jersey, although the south-western portion of the ridge lies within Hardyston Township, and the north-eastern tip of the ridge extends over the New York state line into Orange County. The ridge marks the eastern edge of the Great Appalachian Valley, and it divides the watersheds of the Wallkill River and its tributary Pochuck Creek. The two rivers meet at Pochuck Neck, marking the terminus of the ridge.

== Etymology ==
The name Pochuck is a Lenape word meaning "out-of-the-way place." It may have been named so because it is an outlier of the New York-New Jersey Highlands, separated from the rest of the region by the Vernon Valley. This separation gives Pochuck Mountain an unusually high prominence of approximately 695 feet.

== Geography ==
Pochuck Mountain and Wawayanda Mountain to the east form the borders of the Vernon Valley, an important farming and mining area of New Jersey drained by Pochuck Creek. Immediately to the northwest of the ridge lies the Black Dirt Region, which is drained by the Wallkill River. Both valleys are part of an elongated lowland region known as the Great Appalachian Valley that divides the Appalachian Mountains for hundreds of miles. Due to the unusual positioning of Pochuck Mountain relative to the neighboring mountains, the Vernon Valley is a somewhat isolated prong of the rest of the Great Appalachian Valley.

=== Watershed ===
As the entire mountain is drained by the Wallkill River and its tributary Pochuck Creek, the region lies completely within the Wallkill River watershed. The Wallkill River flows northeast until it joins Rondout Creek near Rifton, New York. Rondout Creek then tributes the Hudson River in Kingston, New York. The Hudson River ultimately drains into the Atlantic Ocean via the New York Harbor.

Lakes on Pochuck Mountain include Lake Glenwood, Lake Pochung, Lake Wallkill, Pleasant Valley Lake, Tall Timbers Lake, Lake Panorama, Louemma Lake, and Scenic Lakes (2 manmade lakes in the Scenic Lakes community). Their waters are used for a variety of recreational purposes including fishing, swimming, boating and ice skating.

=== Mountain passes ===
- Lake Pochung Road separates the summit from the ridge's southwestern peaks.
- CR 565 (Glenwood Road) separates the summit from the ridge's northern peaks.
- CR 641 (Drew Mountain Road) separates the summit from the ridge's northeastern peaks.
- Glenwood Mountain Road separates several of the ridge's northeastern peaks.

=== Appalachian Trail ===
The Appalachian Trail runs over the top of the ridge within Wawayanda State Park, north of the summit.

== Geology ==
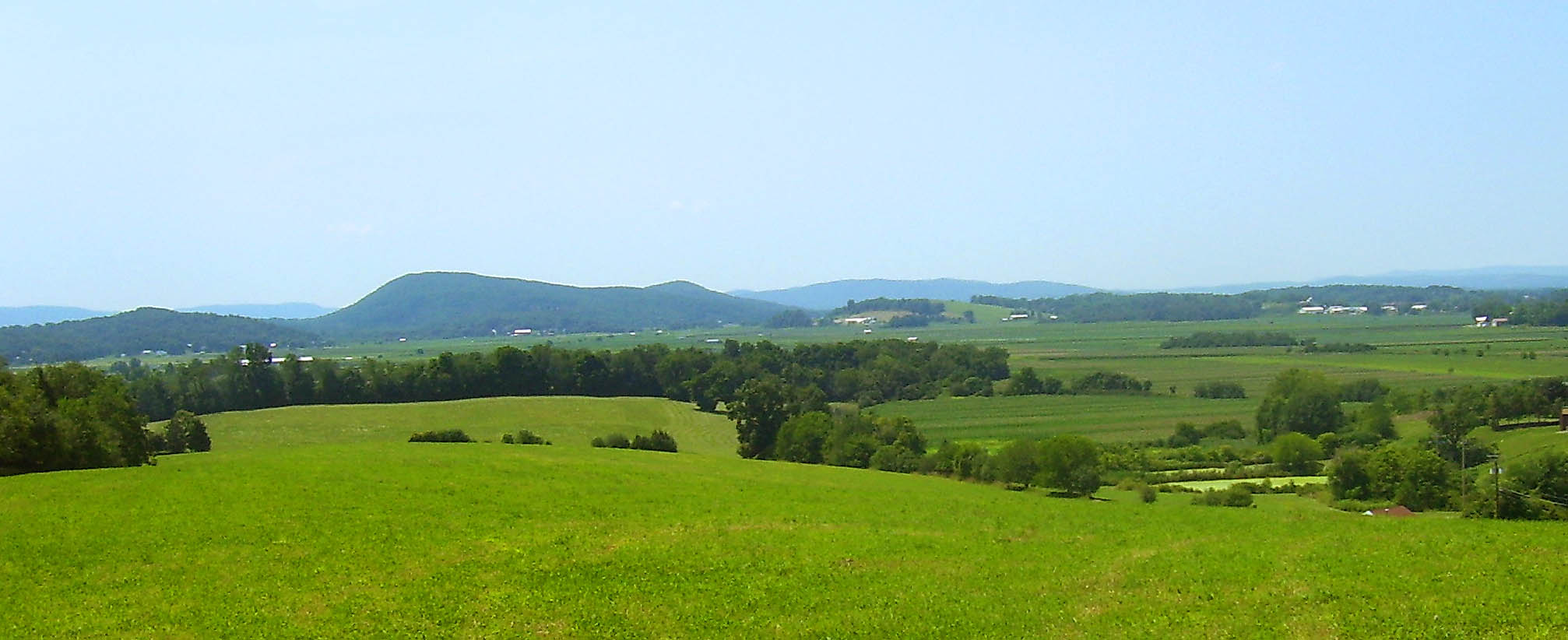
Pochuck (center) seen from the north

Pochuck Mountain is part of the Reading Prong of the New England Uplands subprovince of the New England province of the Appalachian Highlands. In fact, it is the northernmost ridge of the Reading Prong in New Jersey. The rocks that form Pochuck Mountain are comprised from the same belt that make up nearby Wawayanda Mountain. This belt consists of ancient crystalline metamorphic rocks. As such, the New England province as a whole, along with the similarly composed Blue Ridge province further south, are often together referred to as the Crystalline Appalachians.

The Crystalline Appalachians extend as far north as the Green Mountains of Vermont and as far south as the Blue Ridge Mountains, although a segment of the belt between the Reading Prong and South Mountain in Pennsylvania does not break the Earth's surface. The Crystalline Appalachians are distinct from the parallel Sedimentary Appalachians which run from Georgia to New York. The nearby Kittatinny Mountains are representative of these sedimentary formations.

Portions of the Reading Prong in New Jersey are known to contain Uranium deposits, linked to reported Radon contamination in certain residential areas developed on the prong. The naturally occurring Radon (^{226}Ra) is a product of the decay chain of the Uranium isotope ^{238}U.

== Wildlife ==
Mammals inhabiting Pochuck Mountain include black bear, white-tailed deer, opossum, foxes, raccoons, squirrels, skunk, bobcat, fisher, porcupine, coyote, bats, chipmunks, groundhogs and field mice.

== Industry ==
While the developed portions of Pochuck Mountain have largely been put to residential use, the mountain and its foothills have historically been a center for mining. In 1871, the South Vernon extension of the Sussex Railroad from Hamburg to McAfee (paralleling present-day Route 94) serviced iron ore mining operations on the east side of the ridge in Vernon Township. Today, a substantial portion of the southwestern face of the ridge near Scenic Lakes is being used by Raia Industries to support gneiss mining, which has raised substantial concern among local residents with regard to environmental degradation and habitat loss for native and migratory species.
