= Vernon Valley, New Jersey =

Populated place in Sussex County, New Jersey, US

- Census-designated place
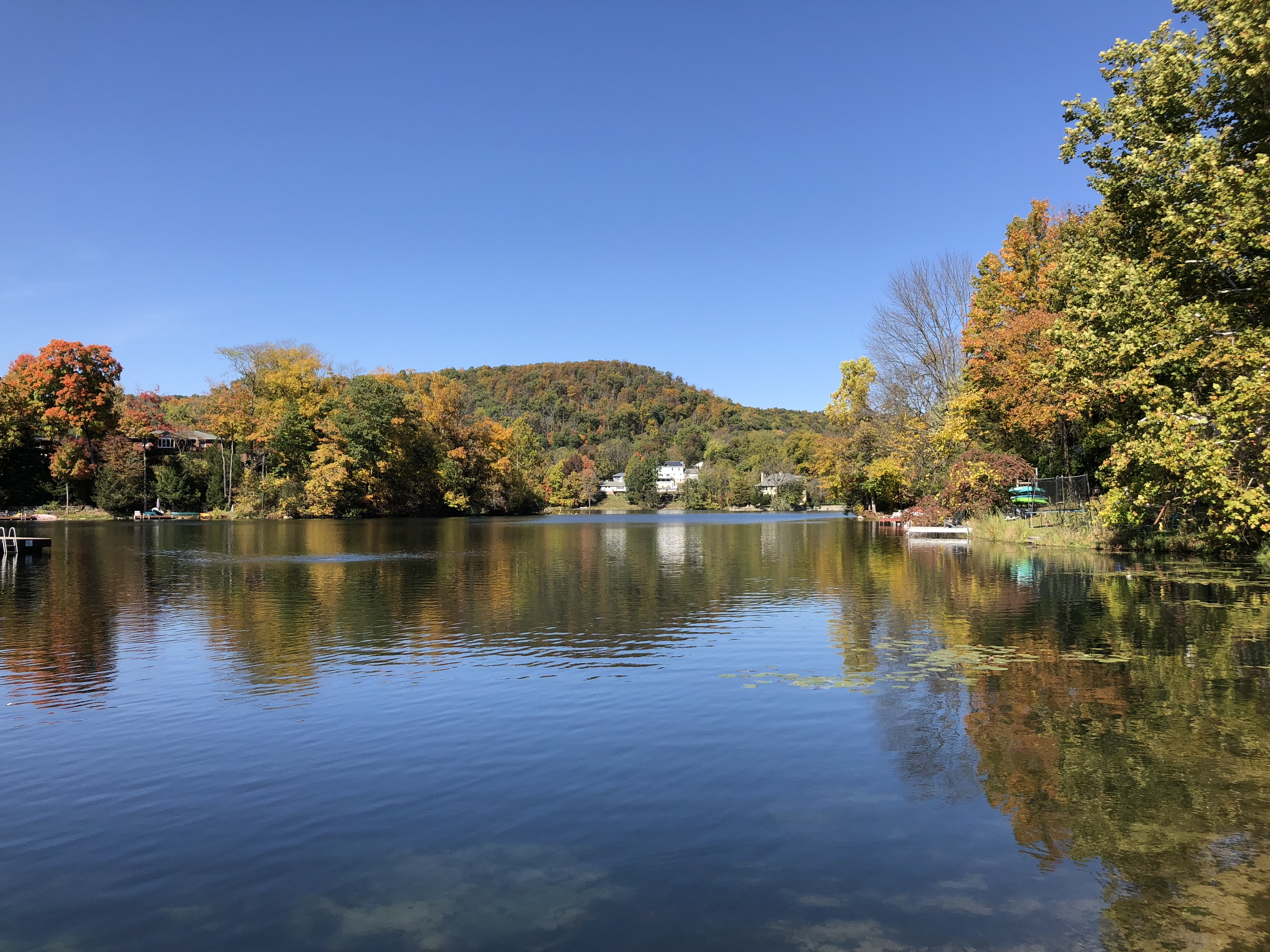
- Vernon Valley Lake

- Map of Vernon Valley highlighted within Sussex County. Right: Location of Sussex County highlighted within New Jersey.

- Location in Sussex County Location in New Jersey Location in the United States
- Coordinates: 41.242167°N 74.486047°W
- Country: United States
- State: New Jersey
- County: Sussex
- Township: Vernon

Area
  - Total: 2.71 sq mi (7.01 km^{2})
  - Land: 2.66 sq mi (6.90 km^{2})
  - Water: 0.042 sq mi (0.11 km^{2}) 1.04%
- Elevation: 597 ft (182 m)

Population (2020)
  - Total: 1,491
  - Density: 559.5/sq mi (216.01/km^{2})
- Time zone: UTC−05:00 (Eastern (EST))
  - Summer (DST): UTC−04:00 (Eastern (EDT))
- Area codes: 862/973
- FIPS code: 34-75750
- GNIS feature ID: 02390429

Vernon Valley is an unincorporated community and census-designated place (CDP) located in Vernon Township, in Sussex County, in the U.S. state of New Jersey. As of the 2020 census, Vernon Valley had a population of 1,491.

== Geography ==
According to the United States Census Bureau, the CDP had a total area of 2.705 square miles (7.01 km^{2}), including 2.677 square miles (6.93 km^{2}) of land and 0.028 square miles (0.073 km^{2}) of water (1.04%).

Vernon is a valley bounded by two Crystalline Appalachian ridges known as Pochuck Mountain and Wawayanda Mountain.

== Demographics ==
Historical population
| Census | Pop. | Note | %± |
|---|---|---|---|
| 1980 | 1,169 | | — |
| 1990 | 1,696 | | 45.1% |
| 2000 | 1,737 | | 2.4% |
| 2010 | 1,626 | | −6.4% |
| 2020 | 1,491 | | −8.3% |
Population sources: 1950 1960 1970; 1980 1990 2000; 2010

Vernon Valley first appeared as a census designated place in the 1980 U.S. census.

=== 2010 census ===
The 2010 United States census counted 1,626 people, 545 households, and 472 families in the CDP. The population density was 607.5 people per square mile (234.6 people/km^{2}). There were 577 housing units at an average density of 215.6 units per square mile (83.2 units/km^{2}). The racial makeup was 96.31% (1,566) White, 0.25% (4) Black or African American, 0.12% (2) Native American, 1.23% (20) Asian, 0.00% (0) Pacific Islander, 0.49% (8) from other races, and 1.60% (26) from two or more races. Hispanic or Latino of any race were 4.86% (79) of the population.

Of the 545 households, 38.7% had children under the age of 18; 73.6% were married couples living together; 8.8% had a female householder with no husband present and 13.4% were non-families. Of all households, 10.8% were made up of individuals and 4.2% had someone living alone who was 65 years of age or older. The average household size was 2.98 and the average family size was 3.22.

24.1% of the population were under the age of 18, 10.2% from 18 to 24, 21.3% from 25 to 44, 35.7% from 45 to 64, and 8.6% who were 65 years of age or older. The median age was 41.6 years. For every 100 females, the population had 99.3 males. For every 100 females ages 18 and older there were 97.1 males.

=== 2000 census ===
As of the 2000 United States census there were 1,737 people, 544 households, and 473 families living in the CDP. The population density was 254.0 people/km^{2} (658 people/mi^{2}). There were 560 housing units at an average density of 81.9 units/km^{2} (212 units/mi^{2}). The racial makeup of the CDP was 96.78% White, 0.63% African American, 0.06% Native American, 1.04% Asian, 0.40% from other races, and 1.09% from two or more races. Hispanic or Latino of any race were 2.99% of the population.

There were 544 households, out of which 50.4% had children under the age of 18 living with them, 79.8% were married couples living together, 5.1% had a female householder with no husband present, and 12.9% were non-families. 9.9% of all households were made up of individuals, and 2.8% had someone living alone who was 65 years of age or older. The average household size was 3.19 and the average family size was 3.45.

In the CDP the population was spread out, with 31.7% under the age of 18, 6.0% from 18 to 24, 32.0% from 25 to 44, 24.6% from 45 to 64, and 5.8% who were 65 years of age or older. The median age was 36 years. For every 100 females, there were 100.6 males. For every 100 females age 18 and over, there were 96.8 males.

The median income for a household in the CDP was $74,943, and the median income for a family was $75,468. Males had a median income of $56,033 versus $36,219 for females. The per capita income for the CDP was $23,801. About 0.8% of families and 1.9% of the population were below the poverty line, including 1.8% of those under age 18 and 5.1% of those age 65 or over.
