= Paradise Mountain =

Several peaks in the United States are named Paradise Mountain, including:

- Paradise Mountain (California) in California
- Paradise Mountain (Nevada) in Nevada
- Paradise Mountain (New Jersey) in New Jersey
- Paradise Mountain (Oregon) in Oregon
- Paradise Mountain (Texas) in Texas

== See also ==
- Paradise Peak (disambiguation)
