= Lookout Mountain (New Jersey) =

Mountain in Sussex County, New Jersey, United States

Highest point
- Elevation: 1,165 ft (355 m) NGVD 29
- Coordinates: 40°56′50″N 74°39′32″W

Geography
- Location: Sussex County, New Jersey, U.S.
- Topo map: USGS Stanhope

Climbing
- Easiest route: Road

Lookout Mountain is a mountain in Sussex County, New Jersey. The summit rises to 1,165 feet (355 m), and is located in the Borough of Hopatcong, overlooking the River Styx, a bay of Lake Hopatcong. It is part of the New York–New Jersey Highlands of the Appalachian Mountains.
