= Maple Hill, Ontario =

Maple Hill, Ontario may refer to three communities:

- Maple Hill, Bruce County, Ontario
- Maple Hill, South Frontenac, Ontario
- Maple Hill, York Regional Municipality, Ontario, a hamlet located south of Ravenshoe, Ontario

== See also ==
- Maple Hill (disambiguation)
