= New Jersey Highlands Coalition =

- Formation: 1988; 38 years ago
- Type: Nonprofit
- Tax ID no.: 68-0636424
- Legal status: 501(c)(3)
- Headquarters: Boonton, New Jersey
- Board President: David Budd
- Executive Director: Julia M. Somers
- Board of directors: David Budd; Jessica Murphy; John Donahue; Michael Keady; Laura Oltman; Jan Barry; Sandy Batty; George Cassa; Theresa Bender Chapman; Hon. Bill Cogger; Stephen K. Galpin, Jr.; James Gilbert; Dwight Hiscano; Michael Henderson; Ned Kirby; Cinny MacGonagle; Chief Vincent Mann; Sergio Moncada; Hon. Michael A. Soriano; John Thonet, P.E., P.P.; Ashwani Vasishth, Ph.D.; Wynnie-Fred Victor Hinds; Dr. Sara Webb
- Website: https://njhighlandscoalition.org/

The New Jersey Highlands Coalition is a New Jersey 501c3 non-profit organization that aims to protect the water and the ecological and cultural resources of the New Jersey Highlands, an 860,000 acre rural and agricultural area in the northern and western parts of the state.

The Highlands serve as a source of drinking water for 6.2 million people, more than half of the state's population. The Coalition has over 1,000 individual members and nearly 80 environmental organizational members.

== History ==
The organization was first formed in 1988 as a program focused on Highlands preservation within the New Jersey Conservation Foundation. Founded in 2005, the Coalition was incorporated in 2006, and received 501(c)(3) status in 2007.
