= Culver Brook =

Creek in New Jersey, United States

Coordinates: 41.1448°N 74.7447°W

Culver Brook (also known as Culver Creek) is the West Branch of the Paulins Kill and flows through Frankford Township and Branchville Borough in Sussex County in northwestern New Jersey. Its headwaters are fed by Bear Swamp, Lake Owassa, and Culver's Lake and merges with the Dry Brook before joining the Paulins Kill's east branch near the unincorporated hamlet of Augusta in Frankford Township.

In 2025, the Culver Brook Preserve was created by the Walkill River Watershed Management Group "to improve the water quality of Culver Brook and the headwaters of the Paulins Kill." As of 2025, the 93-acre property is owned by the "Greater Culver Lake Watershed Conservation Foundation and is being converted into a wildlife preserve."

In May 2025, the Greater Culver Lake Watershed Conservation Foundation secured an additional "adjacent 173-acre forested parcel, which has been dubbed 'Culver Brook Preserve East.'These new preserves will not only safeguard the natural resources and beauty of the region, but also offer valuable green space for the public to enjoy." This is a total of "268 acres preserved as open space in Sussex County." The purchases of the 268 acres were funded in part by the New Jersey Department of Environmental Protection.

== See also ==
- 2025 in the environment
- List of rivers of New Jersey
