= Cage Hill =

Hill in Sussex County, New Jersey, US

Highest point
- Elevation: 846 ft (258 m) NGVD 29
- Coordinates: 40°55′21″N 74°44′12″W

Geography
- Location: Sussex County, New Jersey, U.S.
- Topo map: USGS Stanhope

Climbing
- Easiest route: Hiking

Cage Hill is a conical hill in Sussex County, New Jersey. The summit rises to 846 feet (258 m), overlooking the confluence of Lubbers Run and the Musconetcong River to the south, and Jefferson Lake to the north. It is part of the New York–New Jersey Highlands of the Appalachian Mountains.
