= Culver Ridge =

Mountain peak in New Jersey, US

- Normanook

Highest point
- Elevation: 1,500 ft (460 m) NGVD 29
- Prominence: 120 ft (37 m)
- Coordinates: 41°11′16″N 74°46′0″W

Geography
- Location: Sussex County, New Jersey, U.S.
- Parent range: Kittatinny Mountains

Climbing
- Easiest route: Hiking

Culver Ridge, or Normanook is a peak of the Kittatinny Mountains in Sussex County, New Jersey, United States. The mountain is 1,500 feet (457 m) tall. It lies along the Appalachian Trail in Stokes State Forest, overlooking Culver's Lake to the south, and Culvers Gap, a wind gap, to the southwest.
