= Paradise Peak =

Paradise Peak may refer to:

- Paradise Peak (Alaska), a summit of the Juneau Icefield
- Paradise Peak (Kenai Mountains), Alaska
- Paradise Peak (Idaho), a mountain peak
- Paradise Peak (Nye County, Nevada), a town near Gabbs, Nevada
- Santa Rosa–Paradise Peak Wilderness, a protected wilderness area in Humboldt County, Nevada
- Pic Paradis, the highest point on the Franco-Dutch island of Saint Martin

== See also ==
- Paradise Mountain, the name of several peaks
