= Franklin Marble =

Geologic unit in New Jersey, USA

The Franklin Marble is a geologic deposit located in the Highlands region of New Jersey. The Franklin Marble dates back to the Precambrian geologic era. An early marine environment provided the proper conditions for algae and stromatolites to thrive. The resulting calcium and carbon deposits, as well as other chemical processes, provided the limestone and dolomite that would later be metamorphosed into Franklin Marble.

Approximately six thousand feet of limestone was buried to a depth of nine miles and a temperature of nearly 750 degrees Celsius during the Grenville orogeny. The marble was faulted and altered further during the Appalachian and Taconic orogenies as well. The formations that are visible today were exposed during the late Triassic in the early stages of the rifting of supercontinent Pangaea.

One of the unique features of Franklin Marble are the graphite and pyrite inclusions. Both of these minerals are indicative of fairly high grade metamorphic alteration. This material, specifically the graphite representing metamorphosed carbon, further supports the idea that there may have been life in the Precambrian oceans.
