= Pimple Hills =

Mountain range in New Jersey, United States

Highest point
- Elevation: 1,122 ft (342 m) NGVD 29

Geography
- Country: United States
- State: New Jersey
- Counties: Sussex
- Range coordinates: 41°04.22′N 74°37.36′W
- Parent range: New York–New Jersey Highlands; New England province; Appalachian Highlands
- Borders on: Germany Flats of the Kittatinny Valley and Sparta Valley
- Topo map: USGS Newton East
- Biome: Eastern Temperate Forests (Level I); Northern Forests (Level II); Northeastern Highlands (Level III)

Geology
- Orogeny: Grenville orogeny
- Rock age: Stenian period of the Mesoproterozoic era
- Rock types: Crystalline metamorphic rock and gneiss

The Pimple Hills are a range of the New York-New Jersey Highlands region of the Appalachian Mountains. The summit, reaching a height of 1,122 feet (342 m), lies within Sussex County, New Jersey.

== Geography ==
The Pimple Hills lie between the Sparta Valley on the southeast, drained by the Wallkill River, and Germany Flats to the northwest, a portion of the Kittatinny Valley.

== Geology ==
The Pimple Hills are part of the Reading Prong of the New England Upland subprovince of the New England province of the Appalachian Highlands. The rocks that form the Pimple Hills are comprised from the same belt that make up other mountains nearby. This belt, i.e. the Reading Prong, consists of ancient crystalline metamorphic rocks. The New England province as a whole, along with the Blue Ridge province further south, are often together referred to as the Crystalline Appalachians. The Crystalline Appalachians extend as far north as the Green Mountains of Vermont and as far south as the Blue Ridge Mountains, although a portion of the belt remains below the Earth's surface through part of Pennsylvania. The Crystalline Appalachians are distinct from the parallel Sedimentary Appalachians which run from Georgia to New York. The nearby Kittatinny Mountains are representative of these sedimentary formations.

== History ==
An 1834 description read,

Pimple Hill, a noted eminence of Hardiston t-ship, Sussex co., near the eastern line of the t-ship.
