= Muckshaw Ponds =

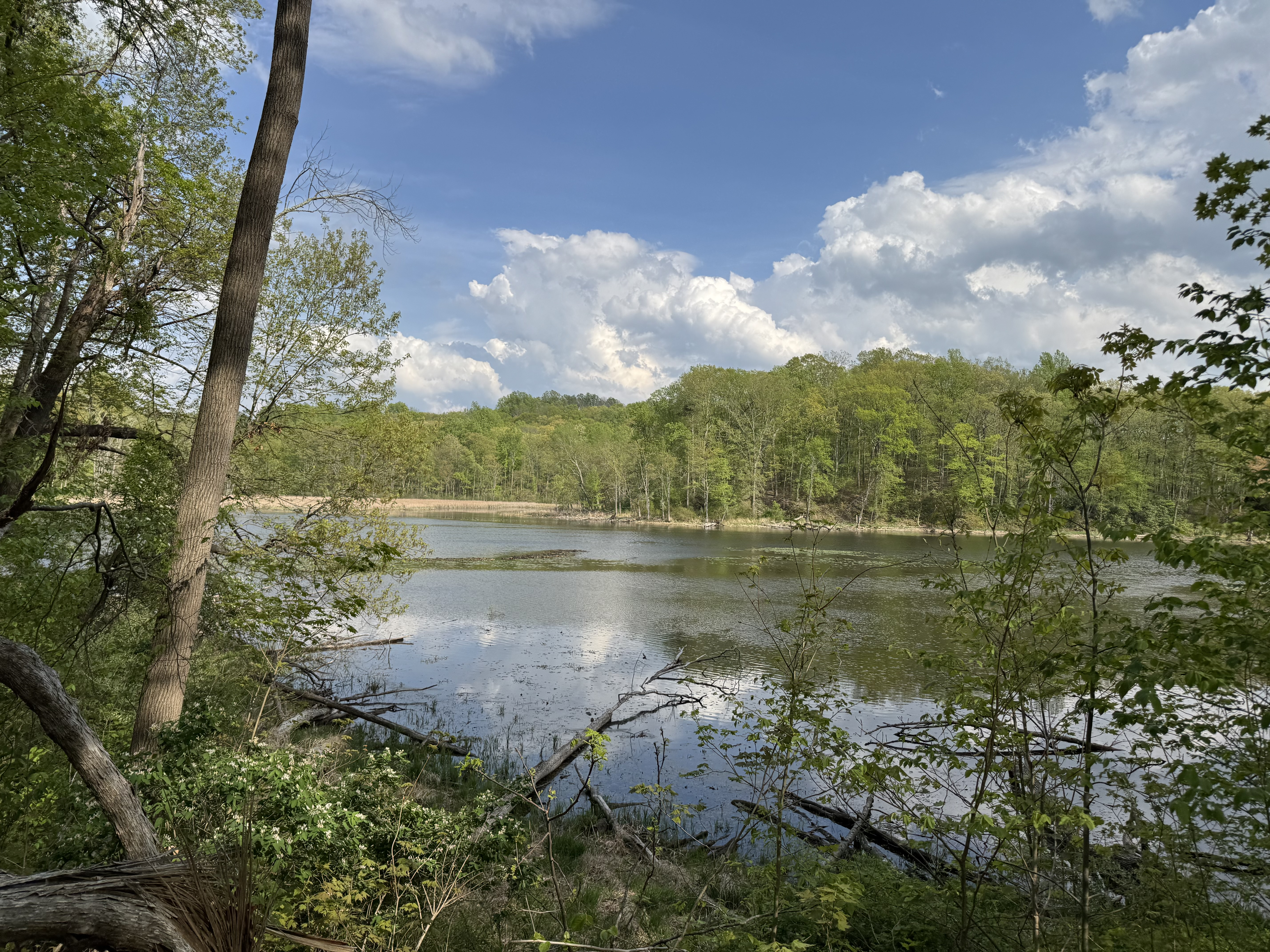
- Muckshaw Ponds in 2025

- Location within Sussex County, New Jersey
- Interactive map of Muckshaw Ponds
- Location: Fredon Township, New Jersey
- Coordinates: 41.030°N 74.776°W
- Type: Cenotes
- Part of: Muckshaw Ponds Preserve
- Primary outflows: Pequest River
- Basin countries: United States
- Managing agency: Ridge and Valley Conservancy
- Designation: Nature Preserve

Muckshaw Ponds is one of three limestone sinkhole ponds located in Fredon Township, New Jersey. During the Revolutionary War, the area was said to be the hideout of Lieutenant James Moody, a British Loyalist. Legend says that Moody and his gang hid precious gems and jewels in nearby caves, but were captured before they could retrieve them.

A historical placard that tells his tale is located at the Dennis Library in nearby Newton.

== Muckshaw Pond Preserve ==
Muckshaw Pond Preserve is 534 acres (1 sq mi) nature reserve owned and managed by the Ridge and Valley Conservancy in Fredon Township that includes the ponds. The preserve features a series of trails that display the diverse ecological area around the three interconnected ponds. Trails are open from dawn to dusk.
