= Dry Brook (Paulins Kill tributary) =

River in New Jersey, United States

Coordinates: 41.1292°N 74.7395°W

Dry Brook is a tributary of the Paulins Kill in Frankford Township and Branchville Borough in Sussex County in northwestern New Jersey, United States. Its waters combine with the Culver Brook or West Branch of the Paulins Kill with the river's East Branch near the unincorporated hamlet Augusta near Branchville.

As of 2005, Dry Brook is classified as a "non trout" containing waterway by the New Jersey Division of Fish and Wildlife.

== See also ==
- List of rivers of New Jersey
