= Maple Hill (New Jersey) =

Mountain in United States of America

Highest point
- Elevation: 1,224 ft (373 m) NGVD 29
- Coordinates: 41°12′17″N 74°22′55″W

Geography
- Location: Sussex County, New Jersey, U.S.
- Topo map: USGS Wawayanda

Climbing
- Easiest route: Hiking

Maple Hill is a mountain in northeastern Sussex County, New Jersey. The summit rises to 1,224 feet (373 m). The Appalachian Trail passes Maple Hill, but does not ascend to the summit. It is part of the New York–New Jersey Highlands of the Appalachian Mountains.
