= Wawayanda Creek =

River in New York and New Jersey, US

Coordinates: 41.252766°N 74.388138°W

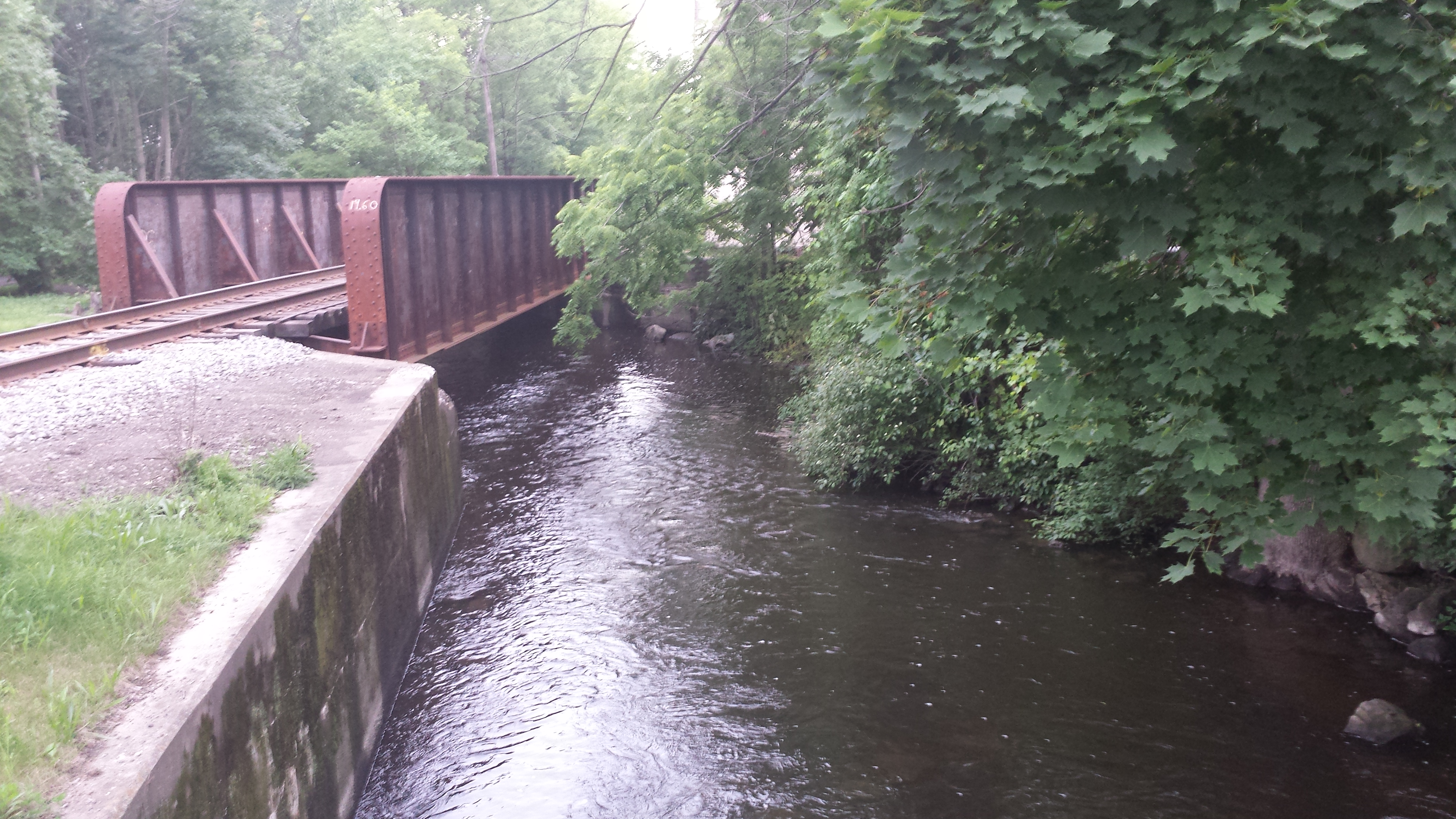
Wawayanda Creek in Warwick, New York

Wawayanda Creek (pronounced "way way yonda") is the name of Pochuck Creek above its confluence with the tributary Black Creek. It is 17.0 miles (27.4 km) long. Wawayanda Creek, via Pochuck Creek, is a tributary of the Wallkill River in Sussex County, New Jersey in the United States. It starts northeast of Warwick, New York, and runs southwest, mostly within Orange County, flowing into New Jersey for several miles to its confluence with Black Creek just north of Highland Lakes, forming Pochuck Creek, which flows north back into New York.

== See also ==
- List of rivers of New Jersey
- List of rivers of New York
