= Maple Hill Cemetery =

Maple Hill Cemetery may refer to:

- Maple Hill Cemetery (Huntsville, Alabama), US
- Maple Hill Cemetery (Helena-West Helena, Arkansas), US
