= Rattlesnake Mountain (New Jersey) =

Mountain in New Jersey, United States

Highest point
- Elevation: 1,489 ft (454 m) NGVD 29
- Coordinates: 41°07′56″N 74°51′48″W

Geography
- Location: Sussex County, New Jersey, U.S.
- Parent range: Kittatinny Mountains
- Topo map: USGS Culvers Gap

Climbing
- Easiest route: (hike)

Rattlesnake Mountain is a peak of the Kittatinny Mountains in Sussex County, New Jersey, United States. The mountain stands 1,489 feet (454 m) high. It lies along the Appalachian Trail in the Delaware Water Gap National Recreation Area. Located near the junction of Mullins Rd. (unmarked) and the trail. Rattlesnakes like any of the rocky areas of the Kittatinny Ridge, for sunning themselves.
