= Bird Mountain (New Jersey) =

Mountain in New Jersey, United States

Highest point
- Elevation: 1,497 ft (456 m) NGVD 29
- Prominence: 157 ft (48 m)
- Coordinates: 41°8′29″N 74°51′32″W

Geography
- Location: Sussex County, New Jersey, U.S.
- Parent range: Kittatinny Mountains

Climbing
- Easiest route: Hiking

Bird Mountain is a peak of the Kittatinny Mountains in Sussex County, New Jersey, United States. The mountain is 1,500 feet (457 m) tall. It lies near the Appalachian Trail in the Delaware Water Gap National Recreation Area, and overlooks Quick's Pond to the east.
