= Paradise Mountain (New Jersey) =

Mountain in New Jersey, United States

- Mount Paradise

Highest point
- Elevation: 1,606 ft (490 m) NGVD 29
- Prominence: 686 ft (209 m)
- Coordinates: 41°7′5″N 74°53′2″W

Geography
- Location: Sussex County, New Jersey, U.S.
- Parent range: Kittatinny Mountains

Climbing
- Easiest route: Hiking

Paradise Mountain, or Mount Paradise is a peak of the Kittatinny Mountains in Sussex County, New Jersey, United States. The mountain is 1,606 feet (490 m) tall. It lies along the Appalachian Trail in the Delaware Water Gap National Recreation Area.
