= Culver's Lake =

- Culver's Lake in Frankford Township, New Jersey.

- Location within New Jersey Location within the United States
- Location: Frankford Township, Sussex County, New Jersey
- Coordinates: 41.170°N 74.776°W
- Type: lake
- Surface area: 555 acres (225 ha)
- Max. depth: 50 feet (15 m)
- Shore length^{1}: 6.5 miles (10.5 km)
- Surface elevation: 830 feet (250 m)
- ^{1} Shore length is not a well-defined measure.

Culver's Lake (formerly Round Pond) is located in Frankford Township, in Sussex County, New Jersey. Fed by Lake Owassa and Bear Swamp, Culver's Lake is the source of the West Branch of the Paulins Kill (also known as the "Culver Brook"). In the late 19th and early 20th century, the lake was used for seasonal recreation. Today, it is a private year-round community owned and operated by the Normanoch Association, a homeowners' association.

The lake has a surface area of approximately 555 acres (225 ha) and a shoreline roughly six and a half miles in length. It has a maximum depth of 50 feet (15 m) and sits at an elevation of 830 feet (250 m) above sea level. It is located near Culver Gap, a wind gap in Kittatinny Mountain, and near the intersection of the Appalachian Trail with U.S. Route 206.

Culver Gap, near Culver’s Lake in Sussex County, New Jersey, has been an important route through the Kittatinny Mountain since approximately 10,000 years ago. The gap is over 400 feet (120 m) below the mountain's summit. The Lenape Native Americans used the gap to hunt and trade on both sides of the mountain. Early settlers from Pennsylvania utilized the water drop from Culver’s Lake to Branchville for various mills. Turnpikes followed the Lenape trails through the gap.

The lake is named for a local clergyman, the Reverend Jabez Collver (1731-1818), who led the Congregational Church in Wantage Township, New Jersey. On September 14, 1774, he purchased 163 acres of land east of Kittatinny Mountain near the lake. However, after the American Revolution, Collver fled to Ontario, Canada after the American Revolution due to his loyalist sympathies.
