= Black Creek (New Jersey) =

River in New Jersey, United States

Coordinates: 41°12′27″N 74°29′38″W

Black Creek is a 6.6-mile-long (10.6 km) tributary of Pochuck Creek in Sussex County, New Jersey in the United States.

== See also ==
- List of rivers of New Jersey
