= Lake Owassa =

- Long Pond
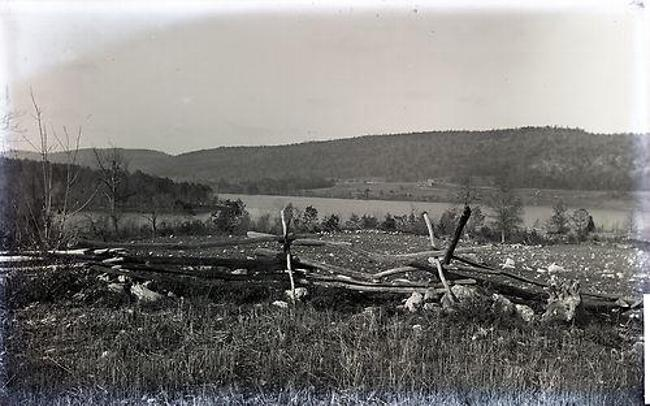
- Lake Owassa in Frankford Township, New Jersey, as seen in 1896. Kittatinny Mountain is seen in the background

- Location within Sussex County, New Jersey Location within New Jersey
- Interactive map of Lake Owassa
- Location: Frankford Township, New Jersey
- Coordinates: 41°09′05″N 74°48′42″W
- Type: Lake
- Part of: Paulins Kill
- Primary inflows: Bear Swamp
- Basin countries: United States
- Surface area: 275 acres (111 ha)
- Surface elevation: 866 ft (264 m)

Lake Owassa (formerly Long Pond) is a 275-acre (111 ha) freshwater lake within the watershed of the Paulins Kill located in Frankford Township in Sussex County, New Jersey. It is fed from runoff from Kittatinny Mountain along its western flank and by Bear Swamp. Water from Lake Owassa feeds into nearby Culver's Lake (formerly Round Pond) before flowing into the West Branch of the Paulins Kill. It is at an elevation of 866 feet (264 m).

While the name Owassa implies an origin from Native American languages, it is not derived from the Unami or Munsee dialects of the Lenape who resided in New Jersey. Conversely, the name was derived from the fabricated name of a fictional Indian character in a long poem written by a local clergyman, George William Lloyd (1821–1906) in Branchville, New Jersey for his deceased wife, Sarah Prince Lloyd (1819–1890).
