= Wawayanda Mountain =

Mountain in New Jersey, United States

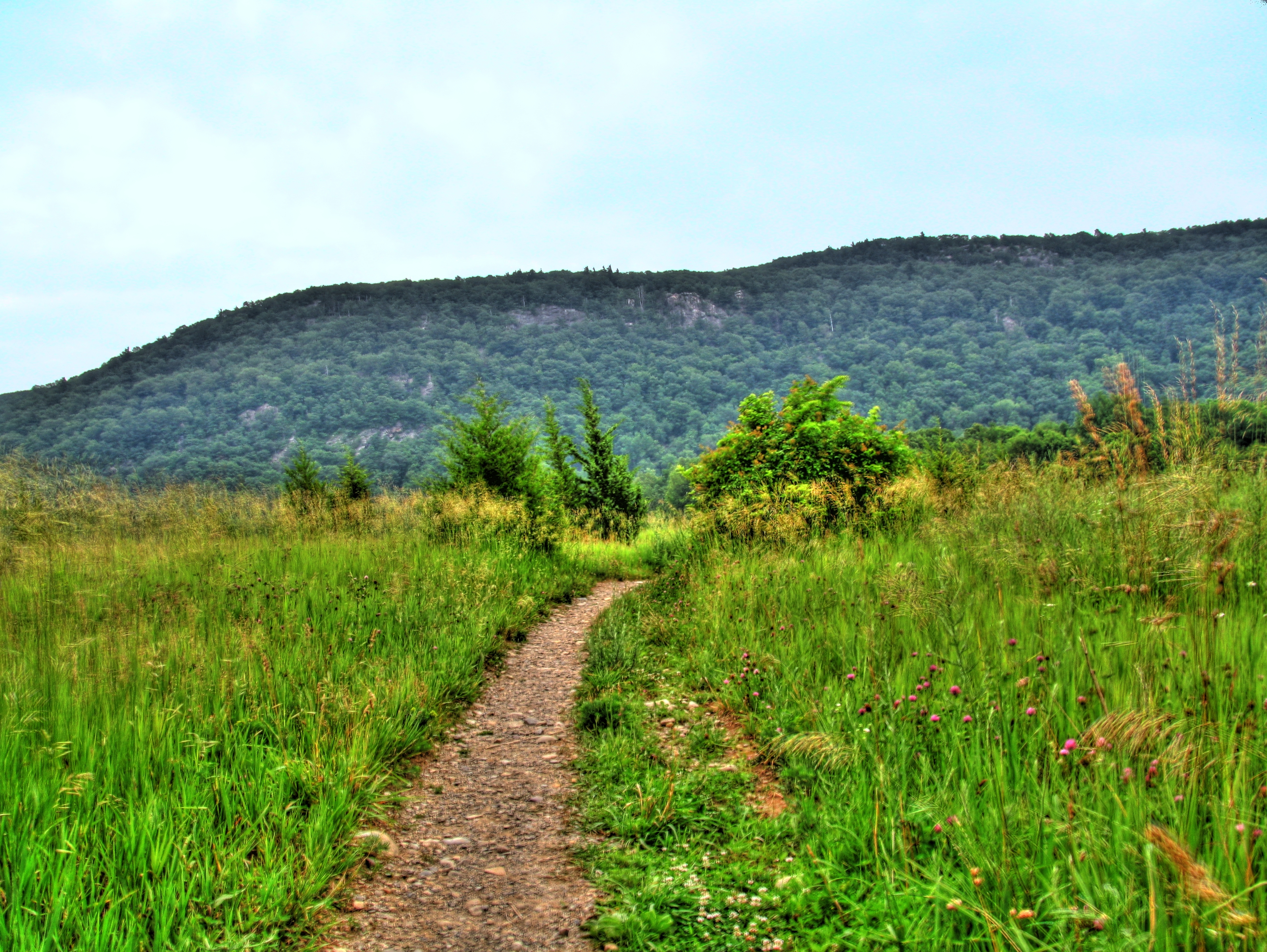
- Wawayanda Mountain from the Vernon Valley

Highest point
- Elevation: 1,470 ft (450 m)
- Coordinates: 41°11′51″N 74°27′43″W

Geography
- Location: Sussex County, New Jersey, U.S.
- Parent range: Appalachian Mountains

Wawayanda Mountain is a ridge in the New York-New Jersey Highlands region of the Appalachian Mountains. The summit lies within Sussex County, New Jersey.

== Geography ==
Wawayanda Mountain stretches over 7,500 acres (30 km^{2}) of land, which consists of deciduous forest with areas of scrub-shrub and coniferous woods.

Wawayanda Mountain and Pochuck Mountain to the west, form the borders of the Vernon Valley, an important farming and mining area of New Jersey drained by Pochuck Creek. The mountain is a temperate rainforest, gaining an average of more than 54 inches of rain each year. It receives more rainfall than anywhere else in the entire state of New Jersey due to the orographic precipitation effect.

== Appalachian Trail ==
The Appalachian Trail runs over the top of the ridge within Wawayanda State Park.

== Geology ==
Wawayanda Mountain is part of the Reading Prong of the New England Uplands—a subprovince of the New England province of the Appalachian Highlands. The rocks that formed Wawayanda Mountain came from the same composition of the mountain belt nearby. This belt, i.e. the Reading Prong, consists of ancient crystalline metamorphic rocks. The New England province as a whole, along with the Blue Ridge province further south, are often together referred to as the Crystalline Appalachians. This extends as far as north of the Green Mountains of Vermont and as far as south of the Blue Ridge Mountains. Although a portion of the belt remains below the Earth's surface through part of Pennsylvania, Crystalline Appalachians are distinct from the parallel Sedimentary Appalachians which run from Georgia to New York. The nearby Kittatinny Mountains are also made from these sedimentary formations.

== Wildlife ==
Mammals inhabiting Wawayanda Mountain include black bear and white-tailed deer.
