= Pochuck Creek =

Stream in the U.S. states of New York and New Jersey

Coordinates: 41°14′07″N 74°28′17″W

Pochuck Creek is an 8.1-mile-long (13.0 km) tributary of the Wallkill River in Orange County, New York and Sussex County, New Jersey, in the United States.

Pochuck Creek is called Wawayanda Creek (pronounced "way way yonda") above its confluence with the tributary Black Creek.

Wawayanda Creek starts northeast of Warwick, New York, and runs mostly within Orange County, dipping into New Jersey for several miles and joining Black Creek just north of Highland Lakes. Pochuck Creek then turns north and returns to New York.

== Tributaries ==
- Black Creek (New Jersey)

== See also ==
- List of rivers of New Jersey
- List of rivers of New York
