= Wawayanda State Park =

State park in New Jersey, United States

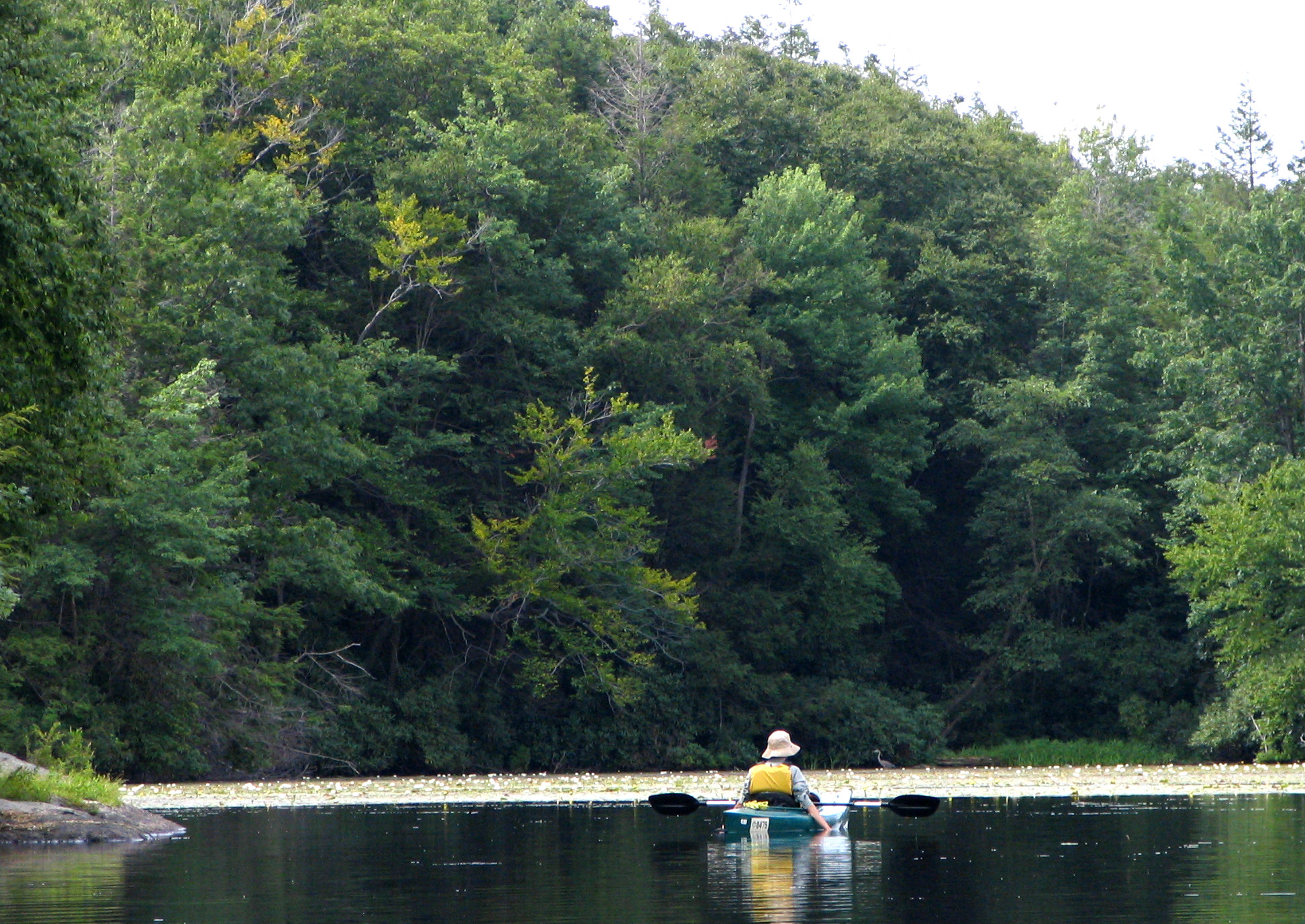
- Kayaker (and great blue heron) on Wawayanda Lake

- Location within New Jersey Location within the United States
- Location: Sussex County
- Coordinates: 41°11′53″N 74°23′52″W
- Area: 34,350-acre (139.0 km^{2})
- Opened: 1960
- Operator: New Jersey Division of Parks and Forestry
- Website: Official website

Wawayanda State Park is a 34,350-acre (139.0 km^{2}) state park in Sussex County and Passaic County in northern New Jersey. The park is in Vernon Township on the Sussex side, and West Milford on the Passaic side. There are 60 miles (97 km) of hiking trails in the park, including a 20 miles (32 km) stretch of the Appalachian Trail. The park is operated and maintained by the New Jersey Division of Parks and Forestry. The hiking trails are maintained and updated by the New York - New Jersey Trail Conference.

The park is part of the Northeastern coastal forests ecoregion. It is home to the red-shouldered hawk, the barred owl and the great blue heron, and includes 1,300-foot (396 m) Wawayanda Mountain and glacially-formed, spring-fed Wawayanda Lake with a swimming beach and boat launch and group camping.

The 1,325-acre (5.36 km^{2}) Bearfort Mountain Natural Area is a part of the park, with Terrace Pond at 1,380 feet (420 m) near the top. The mountain forest includes swamp hardwood, hemlock and mixed hardwood and chestnut oak forest communities; some rock outcrops have a 360-degree view of the surrounding highlands.

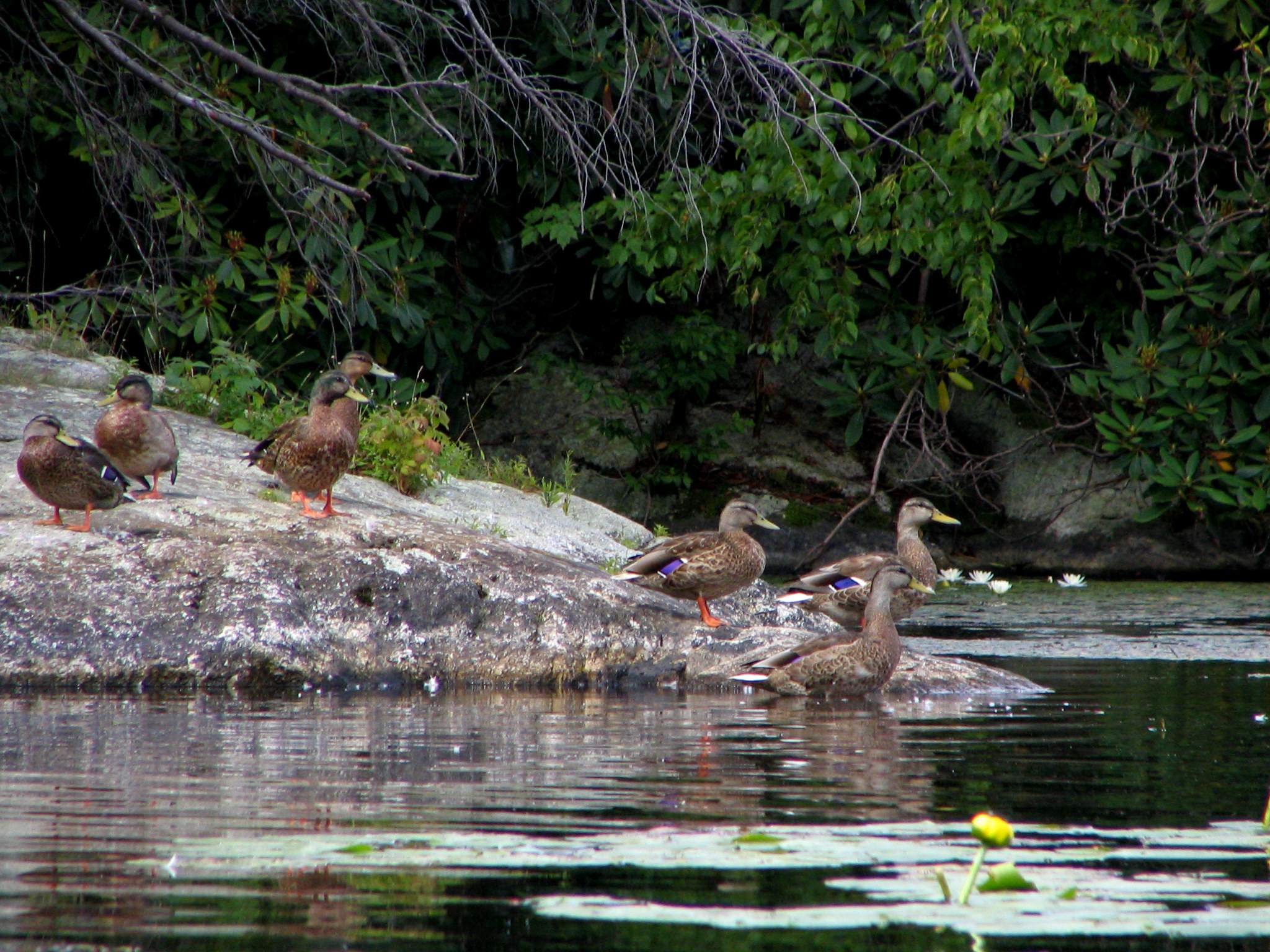
Mallards on Wawayanda Lake

2,167 acres (8.77 km^{2}) Wawayanda Swamp Natural Area is an Atlantic white cedar swamp with a mixed oak-hardwood forest and a lake and Laurel Pond.

399 acres (1.61 km^{2}) Wawayanda Hemlock Ravine Natural Area is a 300 feet (91 m) ravine formed by Doublekill Creek surrounded by a hemlock and mixed hardwood forest. The Appalachian Trail is located on the western edge of the area.

== See also ==
- List of New Jersey state parks
