= New York–New Jersey Highlands =

Geological formation

Coordinates: 41°02′45″N 74°30′43″W

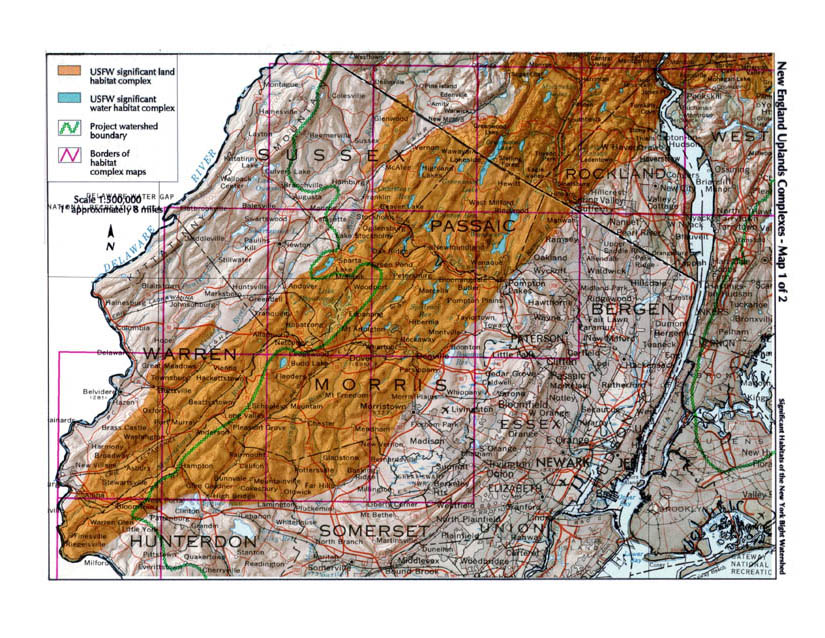
Map highlighting the region

The New York – New Jersey Highlands is a geological formation composed primarily of Precambrian igneous and metamorphic rock running from the Delaware River near Musconetcong Mountain, northeast through the Skylands Region of New Jersey along the Bearfort Ridge and the Ramapo Mountains, Sterling Forest, Harriman and Bear Mountain State Parks in New York, to the Hudson River at Storm King Mountain. The northern region is also known as the Hudson Highlands and the southern as the New Jersey Highlands. A broader definition would extend the region west to Reading, Pennsylvania, and east to the Housatonic River in Connecticut, encompassing the Reading Prong. The highlands are a subrange of the Appalachian Mountains.

In New Jersey, the region's watershed is protected by the state's own Highlands Water Protection and Planning Act (2004). In addition to preserving water resources, the act created the New Jersey Highlands Water Protection and Planning Council (NJ Highlands Council) whose mission includes supporting open space preservation and the creation of new recreational parks and hiking trails in America's most densely populated state. These include the Highlands Trail, designated as a Millennium Trail by the White House Millennium Council and maintained by the New York-New Jersey Trail Conference.

The New Jersey Highlands Coalition was formed in 1988 to protect the resources of the region.

In November 2004, the federal Highlands Conservation Act was passed. The Highlands Conservation Act “recognizes the importance of the water, forest, agricultural, wildlife, recreational, and cultural resources of the Highlands region, and the national significance of the Highlands region to the United States.”

== See also ==
- Franklin Marble
- List of subranges of the Appalachian Mountains
