= Papakating Creek =

Creek in Sussex County, New Jersey, U.S.

Papakating Creek Pepper-Cotton, Pellettown Creek, Pellet Creek
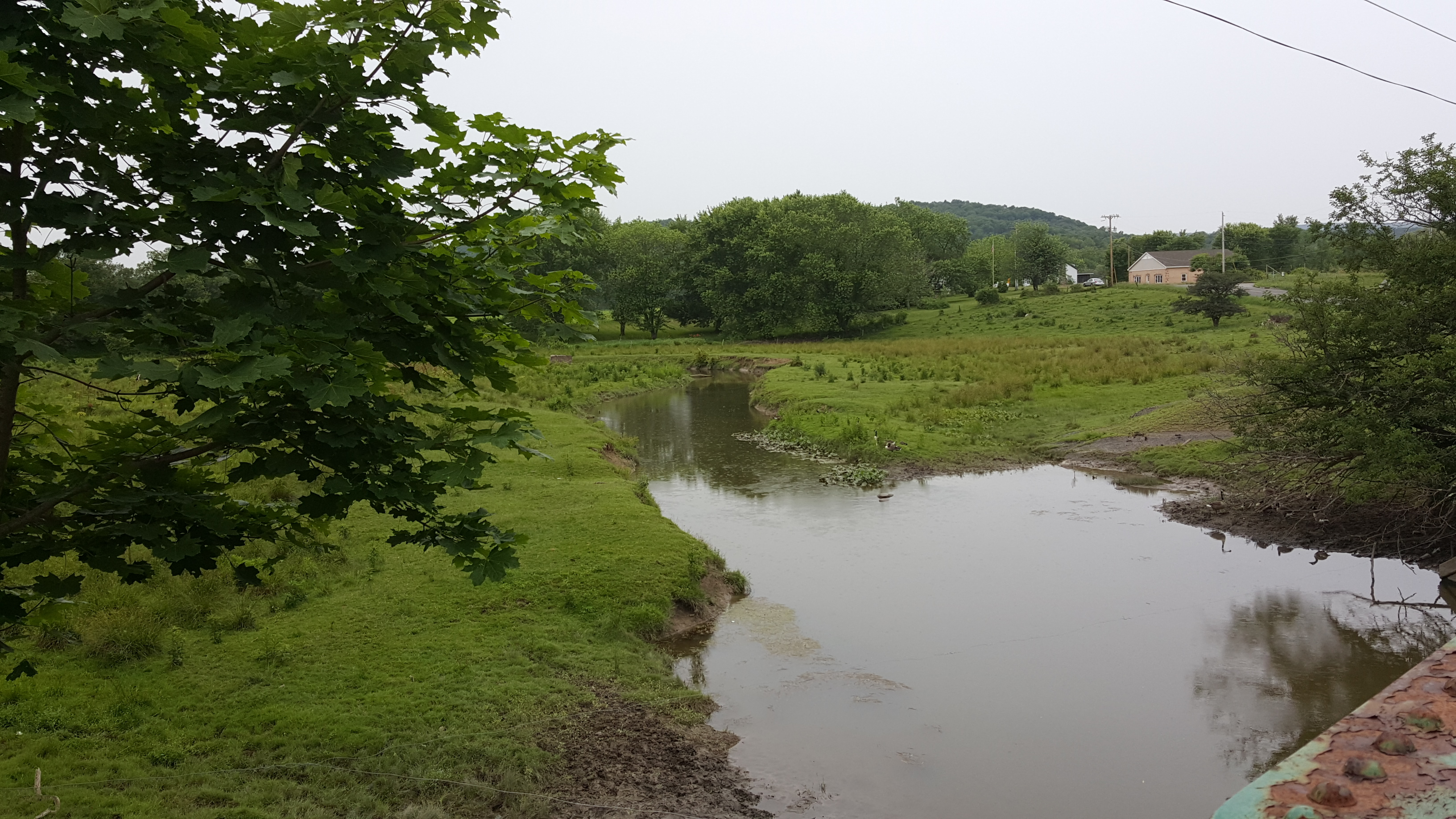
- Looking south from County Route 565 in Wantage Township
- Etymology: Munsee (northern Lenape dialect)

Location
- Country: United States
- State: New Jersey
- County: Sussex
- Municipality: Frankford Township, Wantage Township

Physical characteristics
- Source: Frankford Township, at foot of Kittatinny Mountain
  - coordinates: 41°12′36″N 74°43′02″W
  - elevation: 900 ft (270 m)
- Mouth: Wallkill River, E of Sussex borough
  - coordinates: 41°12′05″N 74°34′35″W
  - elevation: 387 ft (118 m)
- Length: 20.1 mi (32.3 km)
- Basin size: 60.6 mi^{2} (157 km^{2})

Basin features
- River system: Wallkill River (tributary of Rondout Creek, Hudson River)
- Tributaries
  - left: Clove Brook, Neepaulakating Creek, West Branch Papakating Creek

Papakating Creek is a 20.1-mile-long (32.3 km) tributary of the Wallkill River located in Frankford and Wantage townships in Sussex County, New Jersey in the United States. The creek rises in a small swamp located beneath the eastern face of Kittatinny Mountain in Frankford and its waters join the Wallkill to the east of Sussex borough.

Papakating Creek and its three major tributaries drain the northern portion of New Jersey's Kittatinny Valley a fertile valley underlain by shale and limestone of the Ordovician Martinsburg Formation and soils deposited by retreating glaciers in the last ice age. The region which the Papakating Creek and its tributaries drain is largely rural farmland and forests with a few low-density residential communities. The New Jersey Department of Environmental Protection reports that phosphorus and fecal coliform from agricultural or residential runoff as well as arsenic from agricultural pesticide applications or regional mineralogy impair the creek. Within the watershed are lands belonging to two state parks, one federal wildlife refuge, and preserves managed by the New Jersey Natural Lands Trust which set aside tracts for wildlife habitats that protect unique ecosystems and some threatened species.

== History and toponymy ==
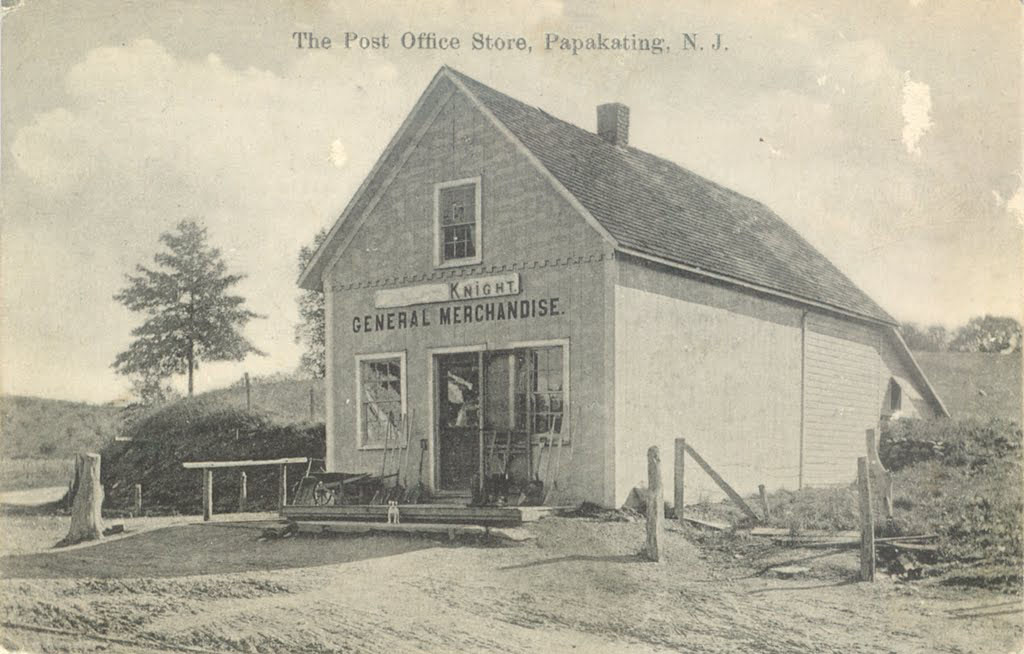
The Papakating Post Office was located in M. R. Knight's General Merchandise store, circa 1890–1900

On June 29, 1897, the United States Geological Survey's Board of Geographic Names approved the toponym Papakating for a creek in northwestern New Jersey. Papakating is derived from the language spoken by the Munsee (the northern branch of the Lenape or Delaware Indians) who inhabited northern New Jersey, northeastern Pennsylvania, and southern New York and western Long Island at the time of European settlement of eastern seaboard of the United States.

The name Papakating, and several variant spellings, had been recorded for the creek consistently since the American colonial period. Maps and documents at the time of the American Revolution often render the name as Pepocottin or Pepper-Cotton. The name was used for both the creek and its valley, and subsequently during the nineteenth century for a small hamlet that later gave its name to a post office and train depot. The post office was authorized as "Pepokating" on August 26, 1851 and the name revised to the more common spelling of Papakating in 1862. Service to this post office was discontinued in 1923.

Today, the site of a confluence between an unnamed tributary and the Papakating Creek is known as Pellettown and the Board of Geographic Names lists Pellet Creek and Pellettown Creek as historical names that have been used for the creek in the past. These alternate names for the creek, which were used briefly in the nineteenth century, are associated with William Pellet, Jr. (1771–1806) and Obadiah Pellet (1775–1849), who settled along the Papakating after purchasing 600 acres of farmland in Frankford Township in 1801. Obadiah eventually acquired "twelve valuable farms comprising twenty-five hundred acres of land". Pellet established house, grist mill, blacksmith shop and store by 1812, and "the site of these activities was known as Pepocotting (became Papakating), after the stream on which they had located, but gradually adopted the name Pellettown". His son Stephen J. Pellet (1820–1886), a local farmer, merchant, and Justice of the Peace who was appointed the first postmaster of the Papakating post office operating in his store.

Today, the Papakating Creek and its watershed is rural in character; consisting of farmland, forests, and wetlands. There are a few low-density communities. Several of the tributaries of the Papakating Creek have been dammed to create man-made lakes that were the centre of residential developments. in 1926, a dam was erected on Clove Creek in Sussex Borough to create Clove Acres Lake at the site of a former horse racing track and picnic spot. The 32.5-acre (13.2 ha) lake was developed into a lakeside community in that straddles the border between Sussex and Wantage Township. In the 1950s, Lake Neepaulin in Wantage Township was created by damming an unnamed mountain stream. In 2002, local residents of the Lake Neepaulin community decided to name the unnamed tributary Neepaulakating Creek from a combination of elements of the names Neepaulin and Papakating. Despite its seemingly Native American appearance, Neepaulin is not derived from Munsee or any other Native American language. Lake Neepaulin was named after a combination of the original developers children's names. The Board of Geographic Names approved the name on April 8, 2004.

== Course ==
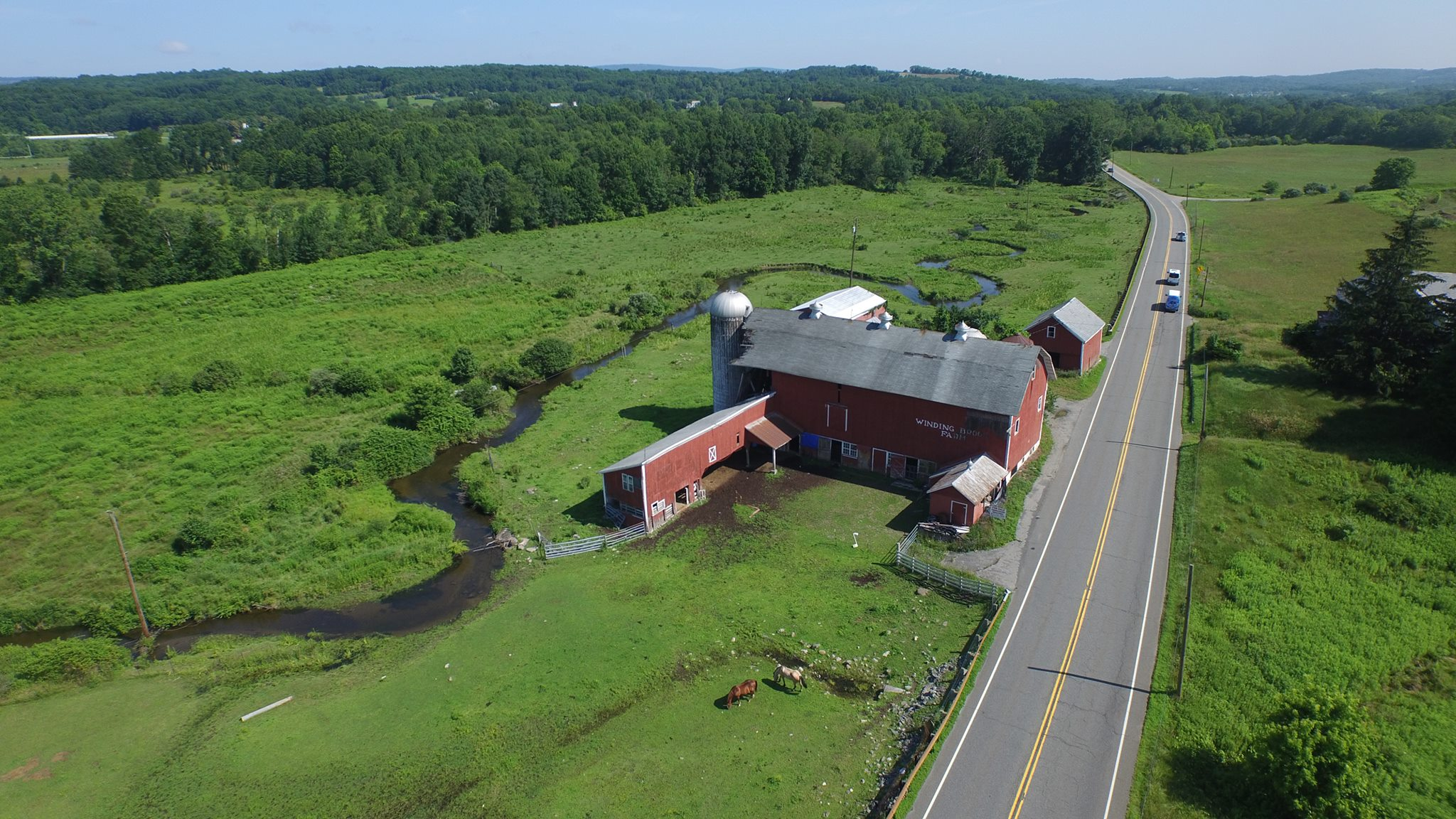
An aerial drone photo of the twisting and turning of Papakating Creek, seen from above Winding Brook Farm in Frankford Township

The headwaters of Papakating Creek are located at 900 feet (270 m) above sea level in Frankford Township, New Jersey. The stream begins in a small swamp at the foot of Kittatinny Mountain, immediately beneath a prominence along that ridge known as Sunrise Mountain, elevation 1,650 feet (500 m). This source is located in the northernmost corner of Frankford Township, approximately 1 mile (1.6 km) west of the hamlet of Beemerville in Wantage Township.

From the source, the Papakating flows southeast through Frankford Township north of the borough of Branchville. In this region, the Papakating is separated from the watershed of the southward-flowing Dry Brook, a tributary of the Paulins Kill, by approximately 500 feet. The two watersheds are divided by a small rise in elevation of 20–30 feet between the drainages the two streams. Immediately to the north of Frankford Plains, a high flat-topped deposit of sand and gravel, the Papakating turns southeast. It generally weaves along the path of George Hill Road in Frankford where it reaches the bottom of Kittatinny Valley and turns to the northeast. (Note: According to Google Maps, the turn to the east and following George Hill Road begins at Latitude 41.164692°N 74.725966°W and ends at 41.141899°N 74.697399°W.)

Flowing northeast, the Papakating passes through a series of named crossroads or small hamlets, including Armstrong and Pellettown in Frankford. The stream meanders through several miles of farmland along the floor of Kittatinny Valley. At Pellettown, formerly known as Papakating, the creek is joined by an unnamed tributary and passes under the path of County Route 565. Route 565 is a north–south county highway connecting Sussex borough and New Jersey Route 23 with Ross's Corner (its terminus) where it meets New Jersey Route 15 and U.S. Route 206. From Pelletown, the road runs roughly parallel to the west of the creek's course. A railbed constructed in the 1870s and 1880s by the Pennsylvania, Poughkeepsie & Boston Railroad (PP&B) for a line connecting Slatington, Pennsylvania to Pine Island, New York parallels the creek's east bank through Frankford and Wantage. This line was later operated by the Lehigh and New England Railroad until 1961.

At McCoy's Corner in Wantage, an intersection south of Sussex borough, the waters of the Papakating Creek merge with its tributary West Branch Papakating Creek. The creek continues to flow northeast on the east side of Sussex Airport. To the immediate north of Sussex Airport, at the hamlet of Lewisburg in Wantage, the waters of both Neepaulakating Creek and Clove Brook join the creek. The Papakating begins to turn eastward and is crossed by bridge carrying New Jersey Route 23. The creek enters a dense marsh terrain, historically known as the "Drowned Lands of the Wallkill", before flowing into the Wallkill River east of Sussex borough and north of Hamburg borough.

== Watershed ==
=== Geology and topography ===
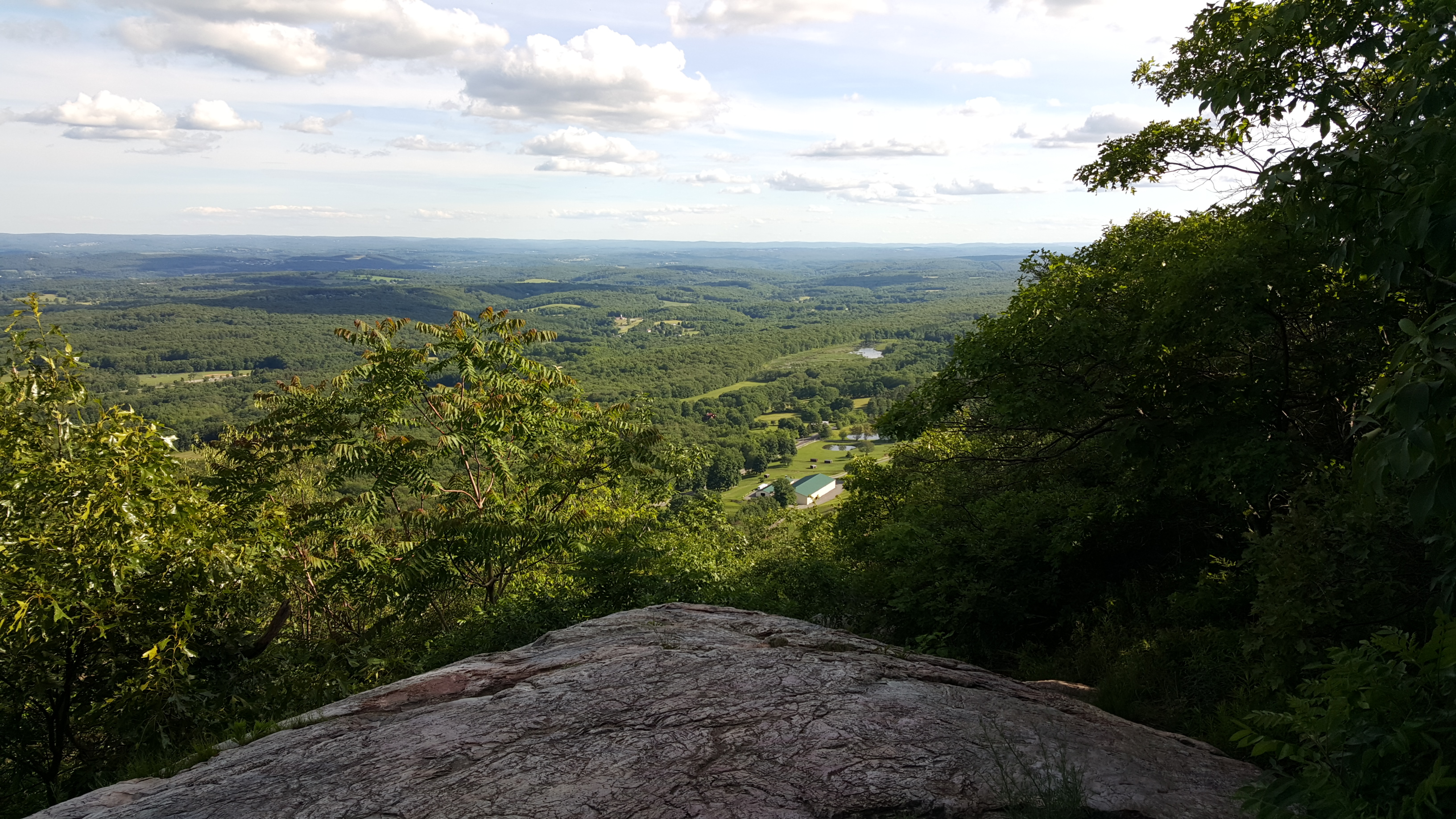
Kittatinny Valley seen from Sunrise Mountain which rises above the headwaters of Papakating Creek and looks out over the creek's watershed.

Papakting Creek drains a watershed of 60.6 square miles (157 km^{2}) or 38,798 acres (15,701 ha) in area. It includes portions of Frankford, Lafayette, Montague, and Wantage Townships, as well as all of Sussex Borough. According to the New Jersey Department of Environmental Protection (NJDEP), the watershed consists of gently sloping agricultural farm fields, wooded forests, wetlands, low-density residential development and older individually built homes. Its topography ranges from gently rolling in the east to strongly sloping in the west. Its watershed contributes to the Wallkill River which flows north and joins the waters of Rondout Creek at Esopus, New York, a short distance before the Rondout flows into the Hudson River near Kingston, New York.

Of the Papakating's watershed's acreage, 10,760 acres (4,350 ha) or 27.7% of agricultural land, 297.6 acres (120.4 ha) or 0.8% is barren land, 16,448.6 acres (6,656.5 ha) or 42.4% is forested, 4,819 acres (1,950 ha) or 12.4% is urban development, 5,982.2 acres (2,420.9 ha) or 15.4% is wetlands, and 490.8 acres (198.6 ha) or 1.3% is water. According to 2002 figures, the watershed was estimated to be home to approximately 11,602 residents of Sussex County.

The Papakating Creek watershed is flanked on the west by Kittatinny Mountain and on the east by the watershed of the Wallkill. To the east of the Wallkill River are the mountains of New Jersey's Highlands physiographic province. Kittatinny Valley is underlain by dark shale and limestone of the Martinsburg Formation and has soils that are glacial in origin. The Martinsburg Formation is a two-mile-thick (3.2 km) layer of a thick turbidite sequence of weaker sedimentary materials, mostly slate, greywacke sandstone, shale, and limestone derived from Ordovician-period deep ocean floor deposits (540 to 400 million years ago). The creek's watershed is located in the northern Kittatinny Valley in New Jersey which is a segment of the Great Appalachian Valley, a 1,200-miles (1,900 km) trough spanning from Quebec to Alabama. Elevations within the Kittatinny Valley range from 400 feet (120 m) to 1,000 feet (300 m). In New Jersey, the northern portion of Kittatinny Valley is drained by the watershed of the Wallkill River of which Papakating Creek is a tributary. Its southern portion is drained by Paulins Kill and Pequest River. The watersheds of northern and southern Kittatinny Valley are divided by a glacial moraine. The Papakating valley's topography and surficial geology is defined by stratified and unstratified drift as well as till and gravel deposits left behind by the retreating glaciers during the Wisconsin glaciation (the last ice age) and feature several kames and kame terraces.

A unique feature in the watershed is Rutan Hill, also called Volcanic Hill, thought to be the throat of an ancient, extinct volcano which was active at the end of the Taconic Orogeny approximately 420 million years ago. This nondescript hill in the Beemerville section of Wantage Township, is the surface expression of a lamprophyric diatreme that is the northern part of the Late Ordovician Beemerville Alkaline Complex that also includes two large nepheline syenite plutons; and several other nearby and much smaller dikes, sills, and diatremes.

=== Hydrology and pollution ===
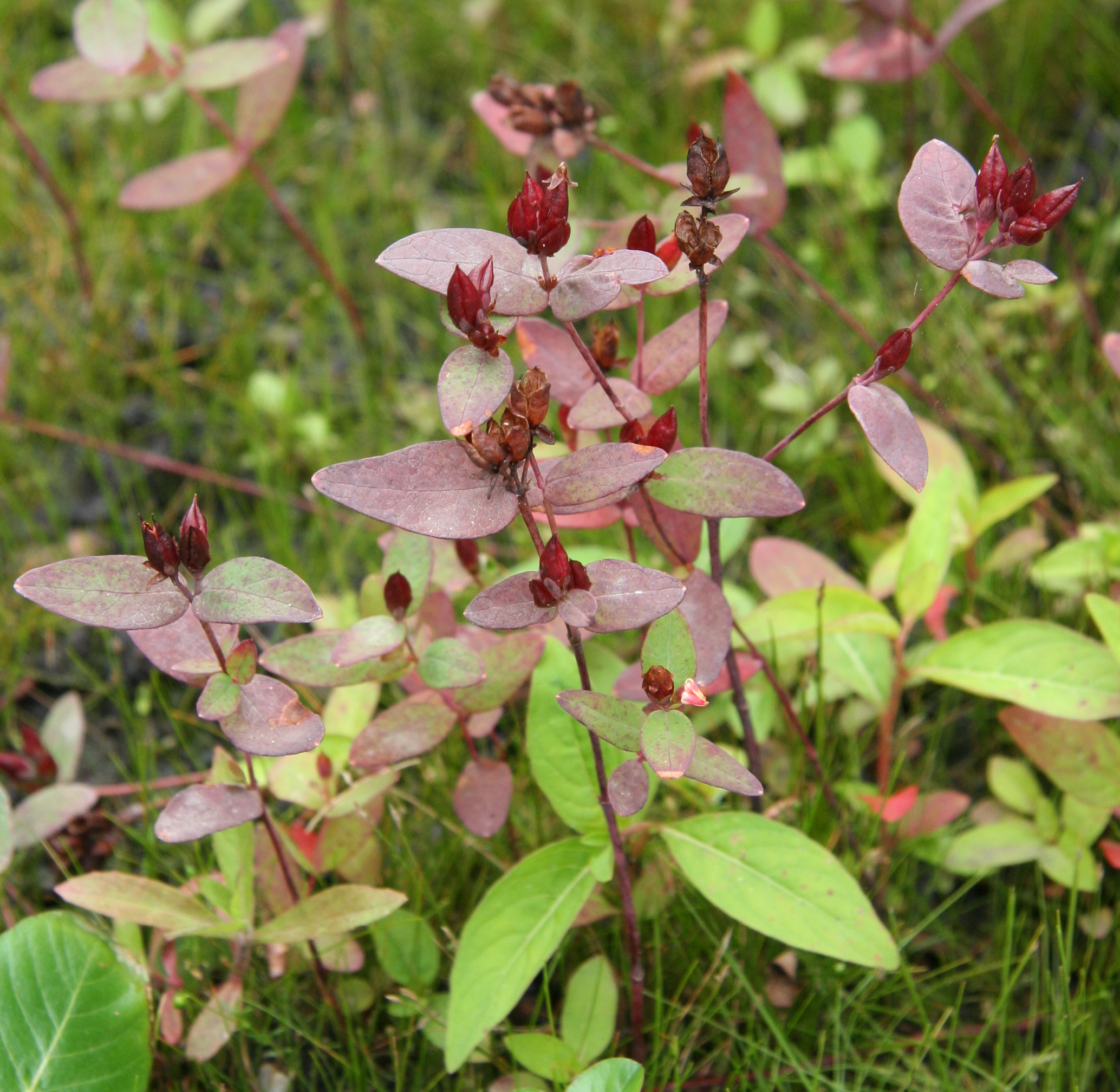
The Armstrong Bog in the Papakating Creek watershed is a habitat for the rare Fraser's Saint John's wort (Triadenum fraseri).

In 2004, the New Jersey Department of Environmental Protection designated a 2.5-mile (4.0 km) segment of Papakating Creek in the vicinity of Sussex Borough and Clove Creek (including Clove Acres Lake) to be impaired by phosphorus loading. NJDEP estimates a phosphorus concentration of 0.0791 mg/L and a discharge of 9,234.1 kilograms (20,358 lb) of phosphorus each year. The source of most of its presence is derived from the runoff of fertilizer applications on residential lawns and agricultural operations. (Note: The figure of 9,234.1 kg/year is derived from adding the reported data of 2444.6 kg/yr from Clove Acres Lake and 6789.5 kg/year from the Papakating watershed excluding Clove Acres Lake.) NJDEP identifies that "runoff from land surfaces was found to comprise a substantial portion of the phosphorus load", citing that large communities of geese that reside within the lake communities along Neepaulakating Creek and the nearby Clove Brook also contribute phosphorus to the creek. Clove Acres Lake is identified as being eutrophic in that phosphorus loading has stimulated excessive growth of algae and aquatic plants resulting in an accelerating aging of the lake, sedimentation and excessive loading of silt and organic matter, fluctuating oxygen saturation and depletion, and that these factors can impact the creek through a potential loss of biodiversity.

The creek is further impaired to a lesser extent by other pollutants including fecal coliform and arsenic. The presence of fecal coliform (chiefly Enterococcus and Escherichia coli) can be attributed both to residential septic and sewage systems and to farm animals and wildlife. While no specific source of arsenic has been identified, NJDEP indicates that possible sources may include the leaching of arsenic into the water from naturally occurring mineralogy within the watershed or to the agricultural use of pesticides.

=== Tributaries ===
Tributary	Photograph	Length	Source location	Source elevation	Mouth location	Mouth elevation	Notes
Unnamed tributary	–	–	1 mile W of Beemerville; 41°12′57″N 74°42′35″W	960 feet (290 m) (Note: This source elevation are rounded to the appropriate multiple of ten after estimating elevation from the location's position on a topographical map and identifying the appropriate elevation contour lines.)	at Pellettown, Frankford Township; 41°09′37″N 74°40′48″W	430 feet (130 m)	
Unnamed tributary (draining Lake Windsor)	–	–	S of Lake Winsdor in Lafayette Township; 41°09′27″N 74°38′19″W	540 feet (160 m)	1 mile S of McCoys' Corner; 41°10′40″N 74°38′23″W	410 feet (120 m) (Note: The Branchville NJ USGS Quadrangle map places the mouth of this unnamed tributary between two locations where the Papakating Creek's elevation is indicated as 410 feet (upstream of mouth) and 409 feet (downstream of mouth) above sea level.)	
West Branch Papakating Creek		–	1 mile N of Beemerville; 41°13′30″N 74°41′54″W	960 feet (290 m)	0.6 miles S of McCoy's Corner, Wantage Township; 41°11′17″N 74°37′57″W	397 feet (121 m)	
Neepaulakating Creek		2.4 miles (3.9 km)	0.4 miles NW of Lake Neepaulin41°13′23″N 74°38′02″W	640 feet (200 m)	at Lewisburg, Wantage Township; 41°11′57″N 74°36′40″W	394 feet (120 m)	
Clove Brook	–	12.0 miles (19.3 km)	1.2 miles E of High Point; 41°19′19″N 74°38′12″W	980 feet (300 m)	at Lewisburg, Wantage Township; 41°11′57″N 74°36′37″W	394 feet (120 m)	

== Climate ==
Because of its location in the higher elevations of northwestern New Jersey the Papakating Creek's watershed has a cooler humid continental climate or microthermal climate (Köppen climate classification Dfb) which indicates patterns of significant precipitation in all seasons and at least four months where the average temperature rises above 10 °C (50 °F). This differs from the rest of the state which is generally a humid mesothermal climate, in which temperatures range between −3 °C (27 °F) and 18 °C (64 °F) during the year's coldest month. Sussex County is part of USDA Plant Hardiness Zone 6. According to the USDA Natural Resource Conservation Service soil survey, the area receives sunshine approximately 62% of the time in summer and 48% in winter. Prevailing winds are typically from the southwest for most of year; but in late winter and early spring come from the northwest. The Kittatinny Valley to the north of Newton experiences a snowbelt phenomenon and has been categorized as a microclimate region known as the "Sussex County Snow Belt." This region receives approximately forty to fifty inches of snow per year and generally more snowfall that the rest of Northern New Jersey and the Northern Climate Zone. This phenomenon is attributed to the orographic lift of Kittatinny Mountain which impacts local weather patterns by increasing humidity and precipitation.

The monthly daily average temperature ranges from 25.0 °F (−3.9 °C) in January to 71.1 °F (21.7 °C) in July. Temperatures reach 90 °F (32 °C) on 12.6 days and fall to 0 °F (−18 °C) on 6 nights annually. Snowfall averages 42 inches (107 cm) per season, although this usually varies widely from year to year. Extremes in temperature range from −29 °F (−34 °C) on January 21, 1994 up to 106 °F (41 °C) on July 10, 1936.

Climate data for Sussex, New Jersey (1981–2010 normals)
Month	Jan	Feb	Mar	Apr	May	Jun	Jul	Aug	Sep	Oct	Nov	Dec	Year
Record high °F (°C)	71 (22)	73 (23)	90 (32)	95 (35)	97 (36)	98 (37)	106 (41)	102 (39)	102 (39)	92 (33)	84 (29)	75 (24)	106 (41)
Mean daily maximum °F (°C)	34.1 (1.2)	37.9 (3.3)	46.8 (8.2)	58.9 (14.9)	69.8 (21.0)	77.8 (25.4)	82.3 (27.9)	80.8 (27.1)	73.1 (22.8)	62.2 (16.8)	50.9 (10.5)	38.7 (3.7)	59.4 (15.2)
Mean daily minimum °F (°C)	15.8 (−9.0)	17.9 (−7.8)	25.7 (−3.5)	36.1 (2.3)	45.4 (7.4)	55.1 (12.8)	60.0 (15.6)	58.0 (14.4)	50.1 (10.1)	38.4 (3.6)	31.0 (−0.6)	21.6 (−5.8)	37.9 (3.3)
Record low °F (°C)	−29 (−34)	−23 (−31)	−10 (−23)	9 (−13)	24 (−4)	33 (1)	40 (4)	34 (1)	27 (−3)	13 (−11)	6 (−14)	−13 (−25)	−29 (−34)
Average precipitation inches (mm)	3.19 (81)	2.83 (72)	3.69 (94)	4.27 (108)	4.10 (104)	4.41 (112)	4.02 (102)	4.18 (106)	4.23 (107)	4.52 (115)	3.47 (88)	3.74 (95)	46.65 (1,184)
Average snowfall inches (cm)	13.8 (35)	9.4 (24)	6.5 (17)	2.0 (5.1)	0 (0)	0 (0)	0 (0)	0 (0)	0 (0)	0 (0)	1.3 (3.3)	9.2 (23)	42.2 (107.4)
Average precipitation days (≥ 0.01 in)	10.6	8.6	11.1	12.4	12.6	11.0	10.9	10.7	9.1	10.1	9.9	10.7	127.7
Average snowy days (≥ 0.1 in)	5.4	3.7	2.6	.5	0	0	0	0	0	.1	.6	3.2	16.1
Source: NOAA (extremes 1893–present)

== Wildlife and conservation ==
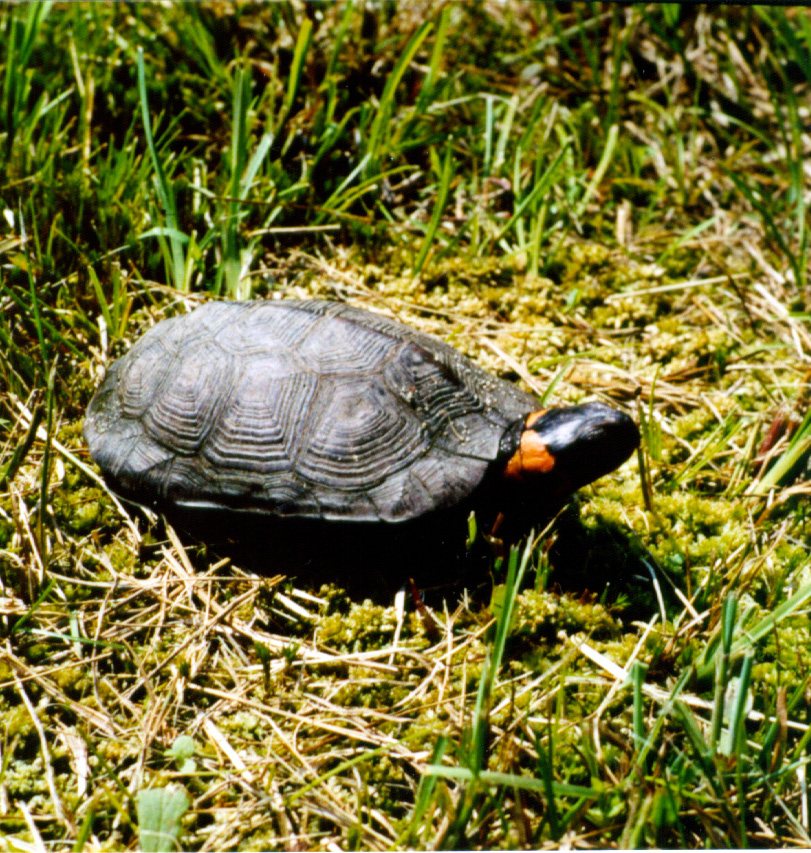
An adult bog turtle (Glyptemys muhlenbergii). Measuring up to 4 inches (7.5 cm) long at maturity, it is the smallest North American species of turtle.

Several large tracts of land within the Papakating watershed are protected areas administered by state and federal governments. Segments of land along the eastern face Kittatinny Mountain are located within the boundaries of High Point State Park and Stokes State Forest. The mouth of Papakating Creek and several areas purchased by preservation or conservation groups along the river's course (known as the Papakating Creek Preserve) are administered by the New Jersey Natural Lands Trust in partnership with the United States Fish and Wildlife Service as part of the larger Wallkill River National Wildlife Refuge. These areas allow for recreational activities including fishing, hunting, hiking, mountain biking, horseback riding, and birdwatching. Further, Papakating Creek is stocked with several species of trout (brook, brown, and rainbow) in the Spring and early Summer by the New Jersey Division of Fish and Wildlife for recreational fishing.

The New Jersey Natural Lands Trust states that the Papakating Creek watershed offers a variety of habitats for plants and animals, including several that are designated threatened or endangered by the state and federal governments. These habitats include:

Meadows and pastures offer grassland habitat for songbirds and hunting opportunity for red-tailed hawks. The forest lands of ash, maple and hemlock provide cool, shaded conditions to the slow moving creek. Here, raccoon, mink and possum make bridges of the numerous fallen trees which cross the creek. ... Wood frog and salamander utilize fringes of some of the smaller wetlands. Painted turtles and bluegills swim within the deeper oxbows and pools along the Papakating Creek.

In 2010, the Trust for Public Land finalized the purchase of the Armstrong Bog which was described as a rare Calcareous fen wetland site in order to aid the "recovery of the federal threatened and state endangered bog turtle" (Glyptemys muhlenbergii), and preserve "plant habitat for the rare Fraser's Saint John's wort" (Triadenum fraseri). The bog is described as a wet meadow that features the pinkish-purple flowers of New York ironweed and Joe Pye weed in late summer and that "woodchucks have dug their dens on the gently sloping edge between the forest and the old corn field". A smaller parcel features streamside wetlands of arrowwood and elderberry which provides "habitat ideal for wood turtles and yellow-throated warblers".

== See also ==
- Black Dirt Region
- List of landforms in Sussex County, New Jersey
- List of place names of Native American origin in New Jersey
- List of rivers of New Jersey
