= Lake Neepaulin =

Lake of Sussex County, New Jersey, United States

Coordinates: 41°12′59″N 74°37′35″W

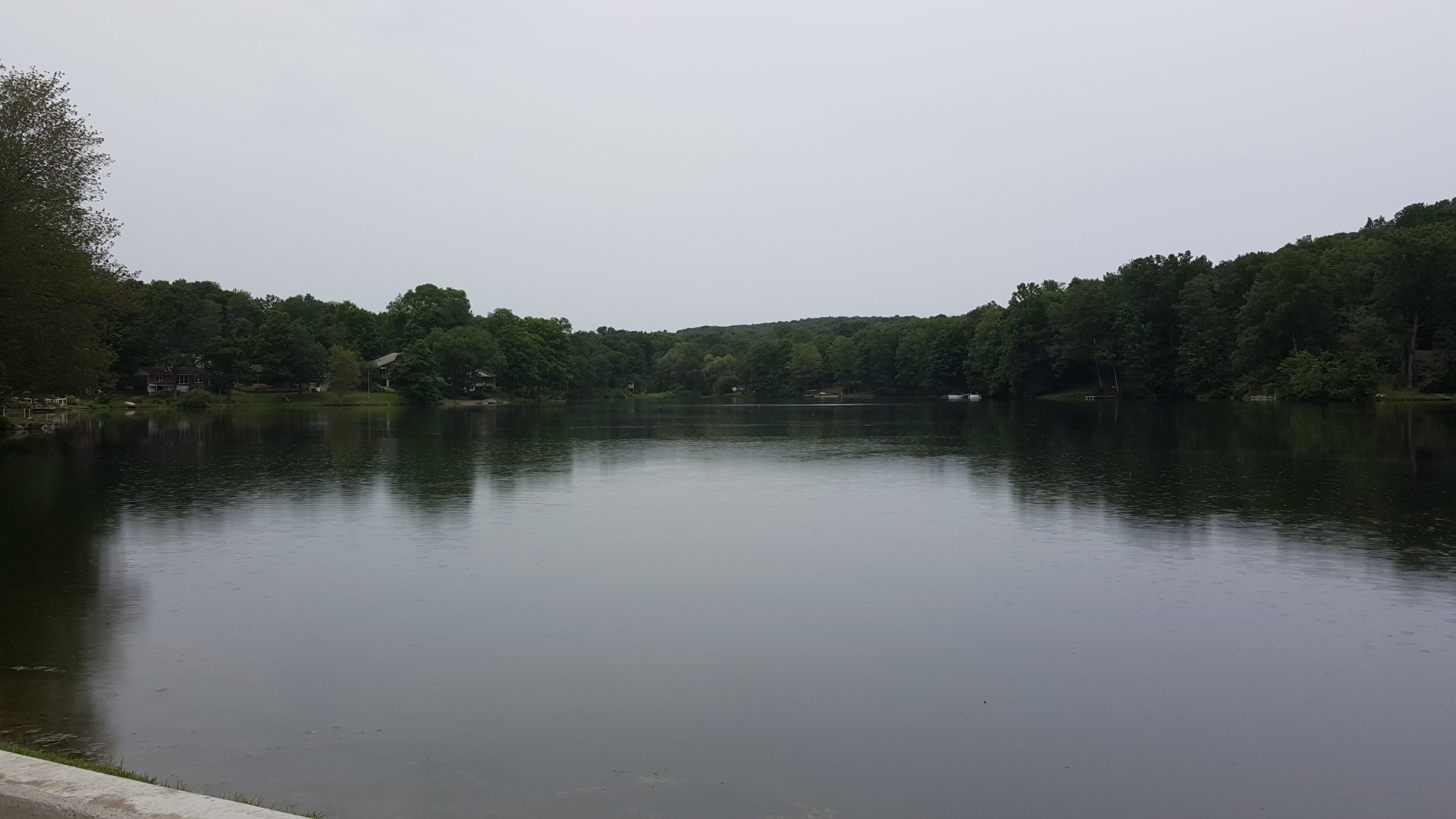
- Lake Neepaulin looking northwest from the dam

- Location within New Jersey Location within the United States
- Location: Wantage Township, New Jersey, United States
- Type: freshwater lake
- Etymology: derived from the names of the residential community developer's children.
- River sources: Neepaulakating Creek
- Built: 1950s
- Max. length: 0.5 miles (0.80 km)
- Surface elevation: 509 feet (155 m)

Lake Neepaulin is a small man-made freshwater lake located in Wantage Township in Sussex County, New Jersey in the United States. Located in the watershed of Papakating Creek, a tributary of the Wallkill River, the lake was created in the 1950s by damming an unnamed mountain stream as the feature of a private residential development. The stream, now known as Neepaulakating Creek, did not receive a name until 2002.

== Description ==
Lake Neepaulin is a man-made lake created from the damming of Neepaulakating Creek, a small mountain stream that was not named until 2002. The creek's headwaters are located approximately 0.4 miles (0.64 km) northwest of the north end of Lake Neepaulin. These headwaters are located a short distance south of County Route 650 (Libertyville Road) roughly halfway between the hamlet of Libertville in Wantage Township and Sussex Borough. Lake Neepaulin's elevation is 509 feet (155m) above sea level. The lake is the center of a private residential development. From the dam, the creek flows southeast for 1.5 miles (2.4 km) before flowing into Papakating Creek, a tributary of the Wallkill River. The creek, lake, and its watershed are located in the Kittatinny Valley which is underlain by dark shale and limestone of the Martinsburg Formation and has soils that are glacial in origin.

According to the New Jersey Department of Environmental Protection (NJDEP), two developed lake communities in the Papakating Creek watershed—Lake Neepaulin and the nearby Clove Acres Lake contribute to phosphorus loading in the waters of Papakating Creek. The phosphorus loading may originate from the runoff of fertilizer applications on residential lawns, nearby agricultural operations, or from large populations of geese that inhabit the lakes.

== History ==
In the 1950s, a real estate developer dammed an unnamed stream located to the west and south of Sussex Borough and created Lake Neepaulin. The lake was the center of a planned private lakeside residential community. The lake's name is an amalgamation of the names of the original developer's children. In 2014, Wantage Township acquired the lake from the former non-profit management organization and has opened designated public areas to township residents for recreation. In acquiring the property, the municipality assumed responsibility for repayment of a $1.2 million dam restoration loan from the NJDEP.
