= Neepaulakating Creek =

Tributary of Papakating Creek

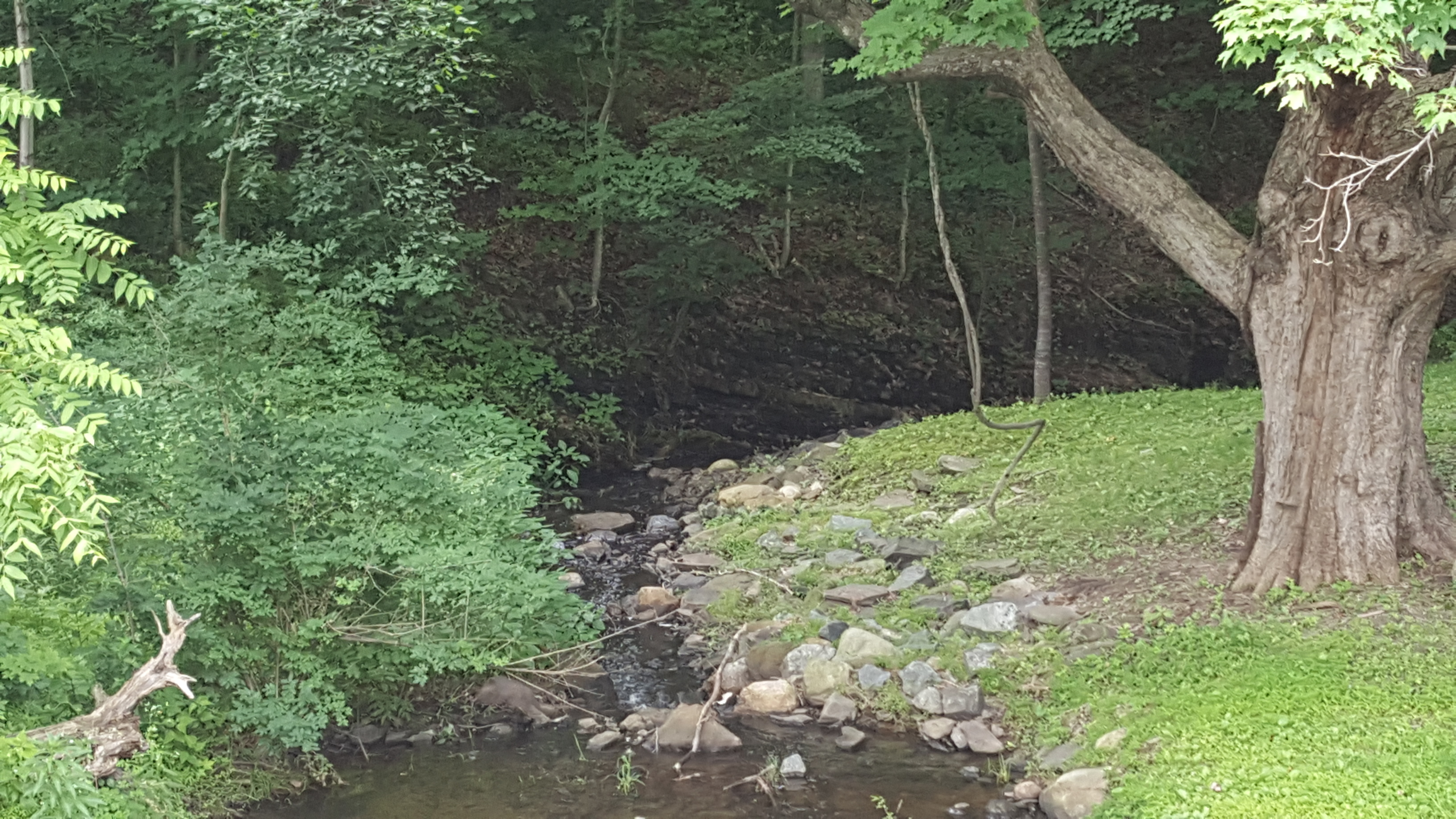
- Neepaulakating Creek near its headwaters northwest of Lake Neepaulin.
- Etymology: Derived from the names of Lake Neepaulin and Papakating Creek

Location
- Country: United States
- State: New Jersey
- County: Sussex
- Municipality: Wantage Township

Physical characteristics
- Source
  - location: northwest of Sussex and Lake Neepaulin
  - coordinates: 41°13′23″N 74°38′03″W
  - elevation: 640 ft (200 m)
- Mouth: Papakating Creek, south of Sussex
  - coordinates: 41°11′56″N 74°36′42″W
  - elevation: 394 ft (120 m)

Basin features
- River system: Papakating Creek (Wallkill River, Rondout Creek, Hudson River)

Neepaulakating Creek is a 2.4-mile long (3.8 km) tributary of Papakating Creek in Wantage Township in Sussex County, New Jersey in the United States. It is one of three streams feeding the Papakating Creek, a major contributor to the Wallkill River. Although the stream was dammed in the 1950s to create Lake Neepaulin as the focal point of a private residential development, the stream did not receive a name until 2002. Residents chose a name that combined elements of the names "Neepaulin" and "Papakating", and submitted a proposal to the United States Board of Geographic Names. The name was approved in 2004.

== Course and watershed ==
Neepaulakating Creek is small stream whose headwaters are located at 640 feet (200 m) above sea level approximately 0.4 miles (0.64 km) northwest of the north end of Lake Neepaulin. These headwaters are located a short distance south of County Route 650 (Libertyville Road) roughly halfway between the hamlet of Libertville in Wantage Township and Sussex Borough. The stream flows into Lake Neepaulin located at 509 ft (155 m) above sea level. The man-made lake, created through damming, is the centre of a private residential development. It flows southeast from the lake's dam in the southeast direction for another 1.5 miles (2.4 km) before flowing into Papakating Creek. It enters Papakating Creek at 395 feet (120 m) above sea level approximately 2.5 miles (4.0 km) upstream of that creek's junction with the Wallkill River at a location directly south of Sussex Borough along County Route 565 near the hamlet of Lewisburg in Wantage Township and near Sussex Airport.

Along with the Clove Brook and West Branch Papakating Creek, Neepaulakating Creek is one of the tributaries that form the 60.6 square miles (157 km^{2}) watershed of Papakating Creek, a major tributary of the Wallkill River. The Papakating Creek watershed is located in the Kittatinny Valley, is underlain by dark shale and limestone of the Martinsburg Formation, and has soils of glacial origin. The topography of the Papakating Creek's watershed ranges from gentle slopes in the east to steeper slopes in the west. According to the New Jersey Department of Environmental Protection (NJDEP), the Papakating watershed consists of gently sloping farmland, forested land, wetlands, older individually built homes, and low-density residential development.

According to NJDEP reports, two developed lake communities in the Papakating Creek watershed—Lake Neepaulin and the nearby Clove Acres Lake contribute to phosphorus loading in the waters of Papakating Creek. The phosphorus loading may originate from the runoff of fertilizer applications on residential lawns, nearby agricultural operations, or from large populations of geese that inhabit the lakes.

== History and naming ==
In the 1950s, a real estate developer dammed an unnamed stream located to the west and south of Sussex Borough and created Lake Neepaulin. The lake was the center of a planned private lakeside residential community. In 2002, an organization known as Friends of Lake Neepaulin, began using "Neepaulakating Creek" as a new name for an unnamed stream that was dammed to create the lake. After a review of resources available on the internet, topographic maps, and other government and historical documents, a state engineer reported there was no evidence the stream had any previous name. The name chosen, Neepaulakating, was a combination of portions of the names "Neepaulin" and "Papakating". Lake Neepaulin was named after a combination of the original developers children's names.

A formal proposal prepared by the residents was submitted to the Board of Geographic Names by Nathaniel Sajdak, described as the Outreach Coordinator of the Wallkill River Watershed and a member of Friends of Lake Neepaulin. Sajdak reported to the United States Geological Survey's Board of Geographic Names that studies such as visual and biological assessments were carried out on the unnamed stream by the Lake Neepaulin Lake Association for roughly two years, during which time they had begun to call it "Neepaulakating Creek". On February 25, 2004, the Sussex County Board of Chosen Freeholders unanimously approved a resolution to support the naming, stating that the county government "defers to the Township of Wantage and concurs with the naming of the tributary as 'Neepaulakating Creek'". On April 8, 2004, the Board of Geographic Names approved the proposal.

== Gallery ==
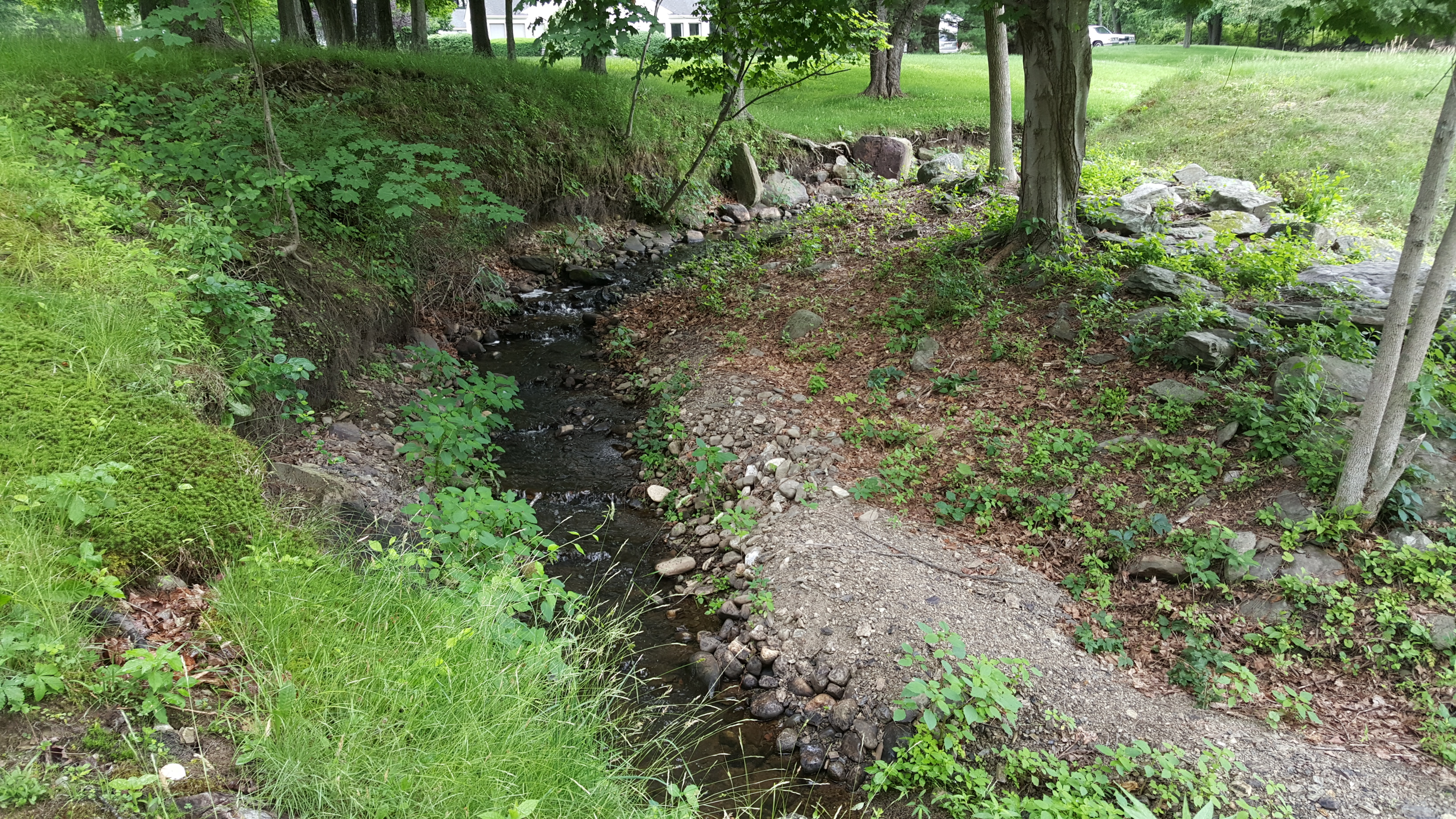
Neepaulakating Creek near its headwaters

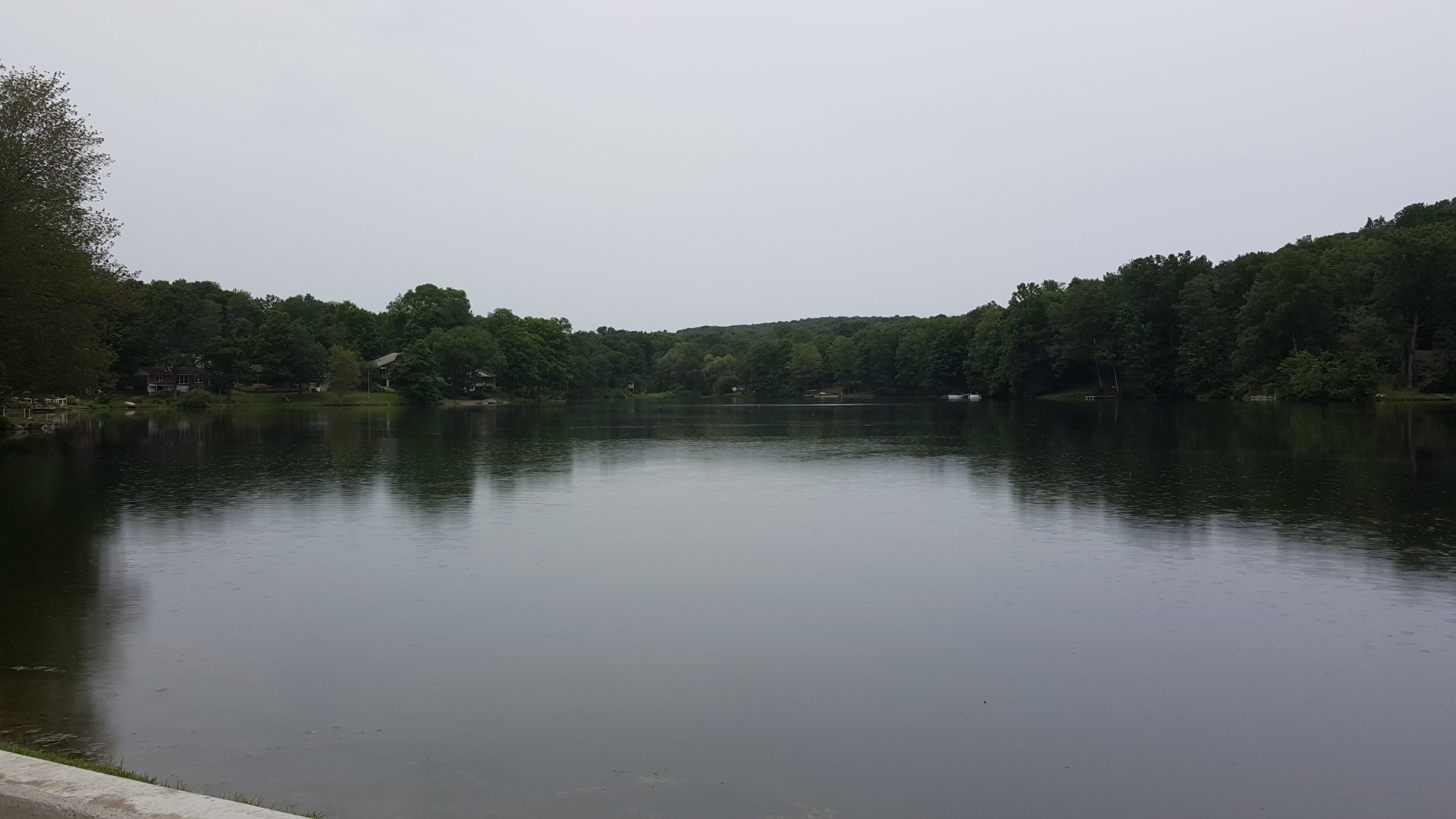
Lake Neepaulin looking northwest from the dam

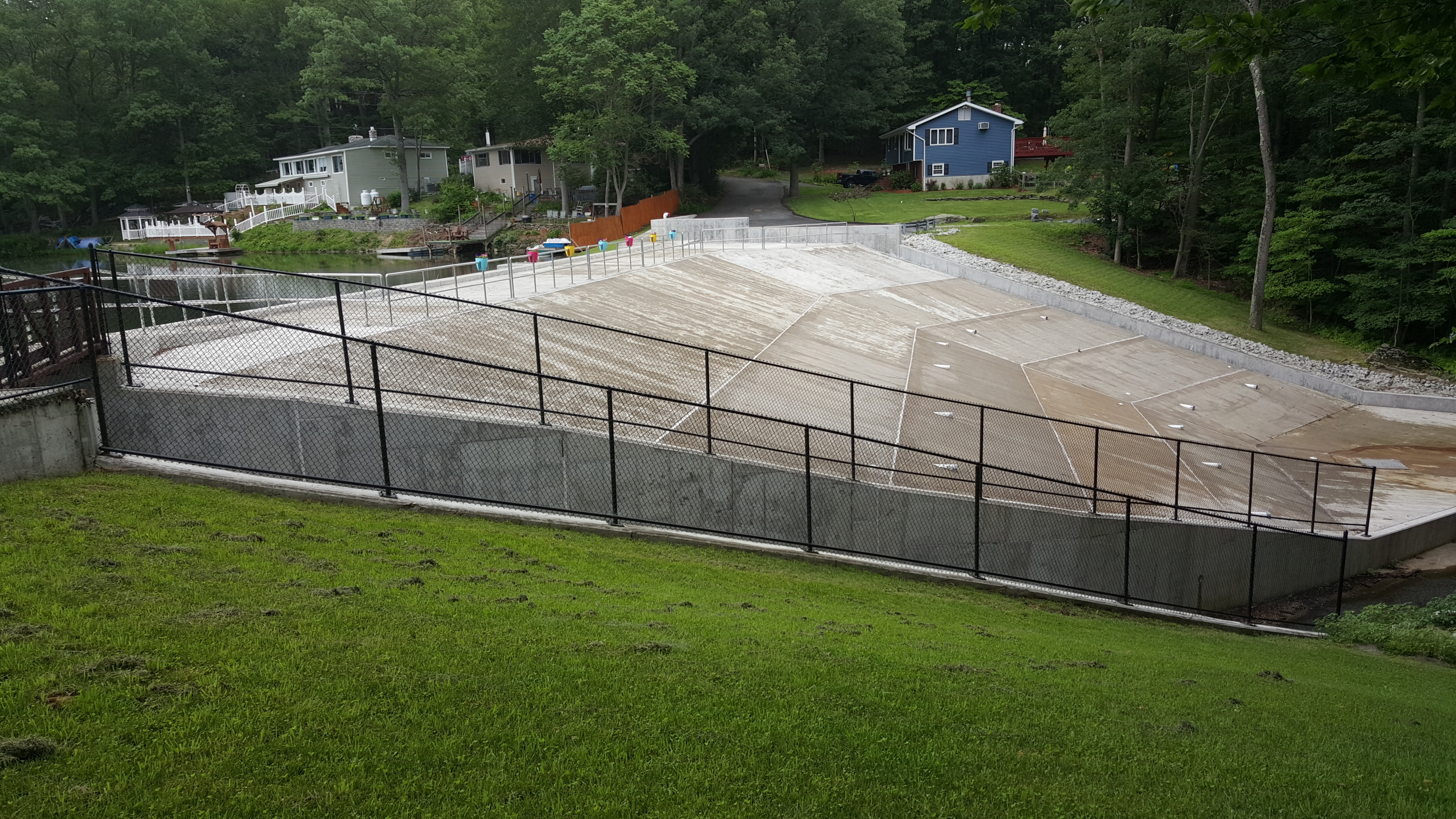
Lake Neepaulin dam

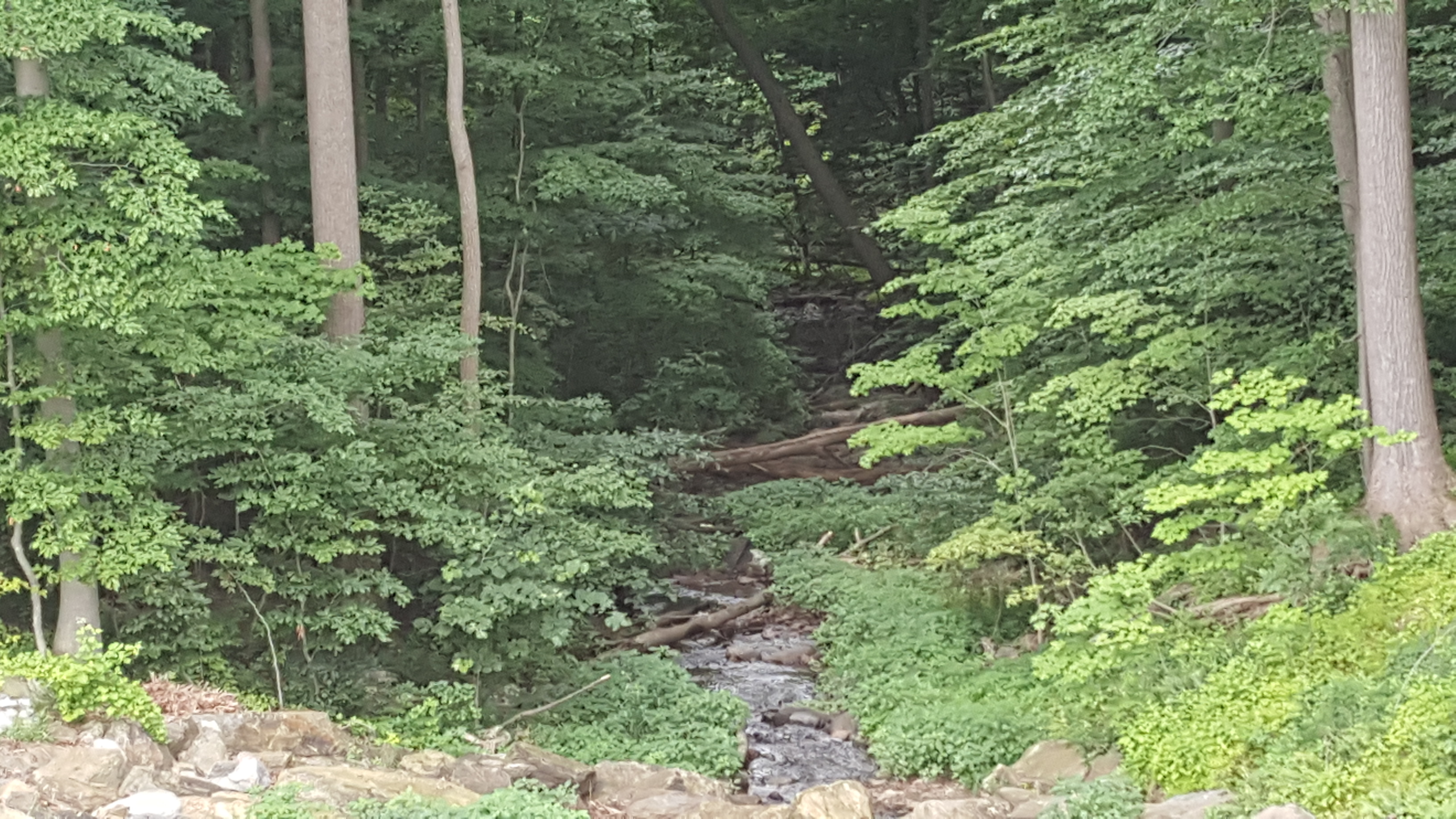
Looking southeast (downstream) from the dam

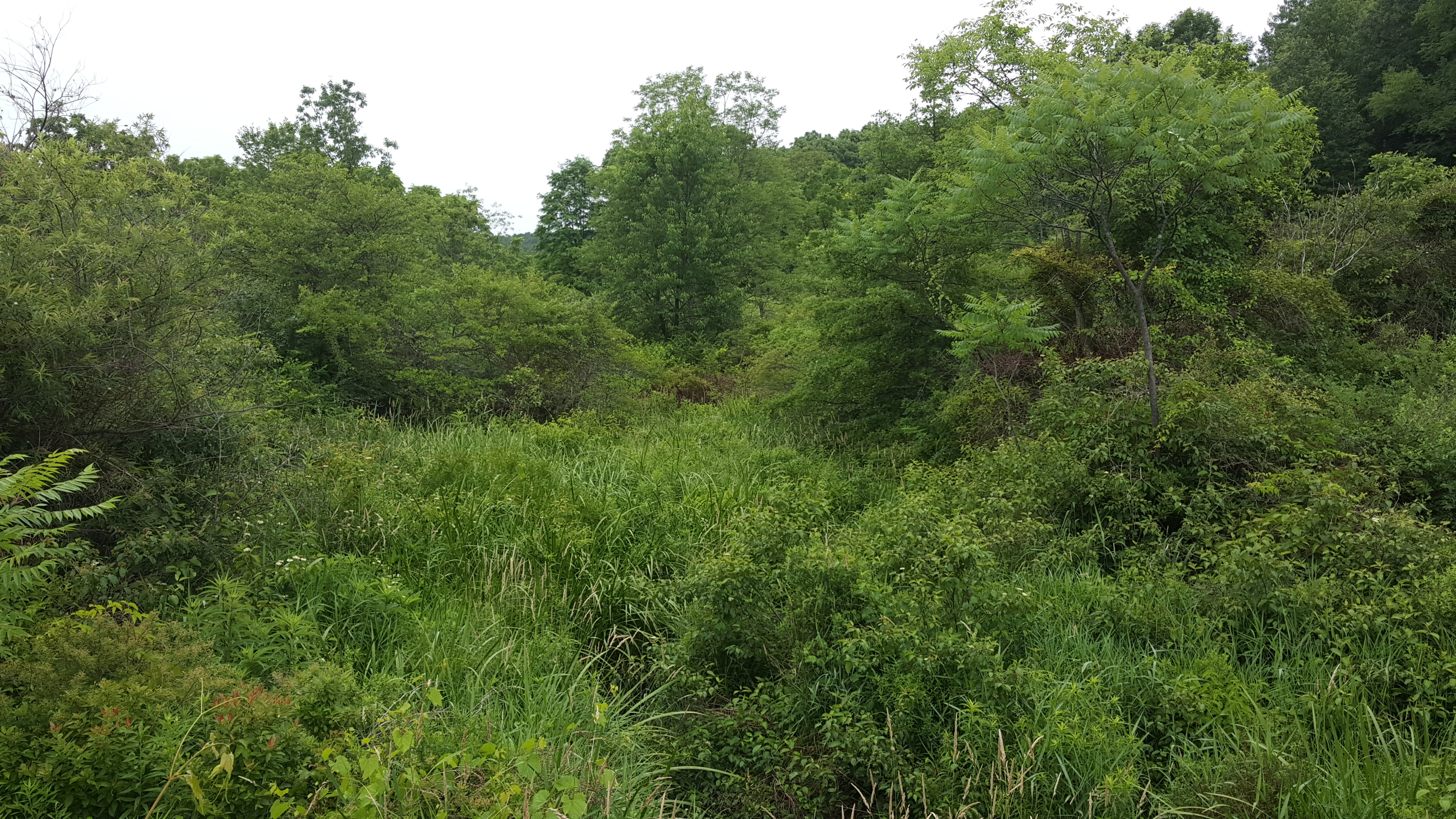
The creek and marsh near Newton Avenue in Wantage

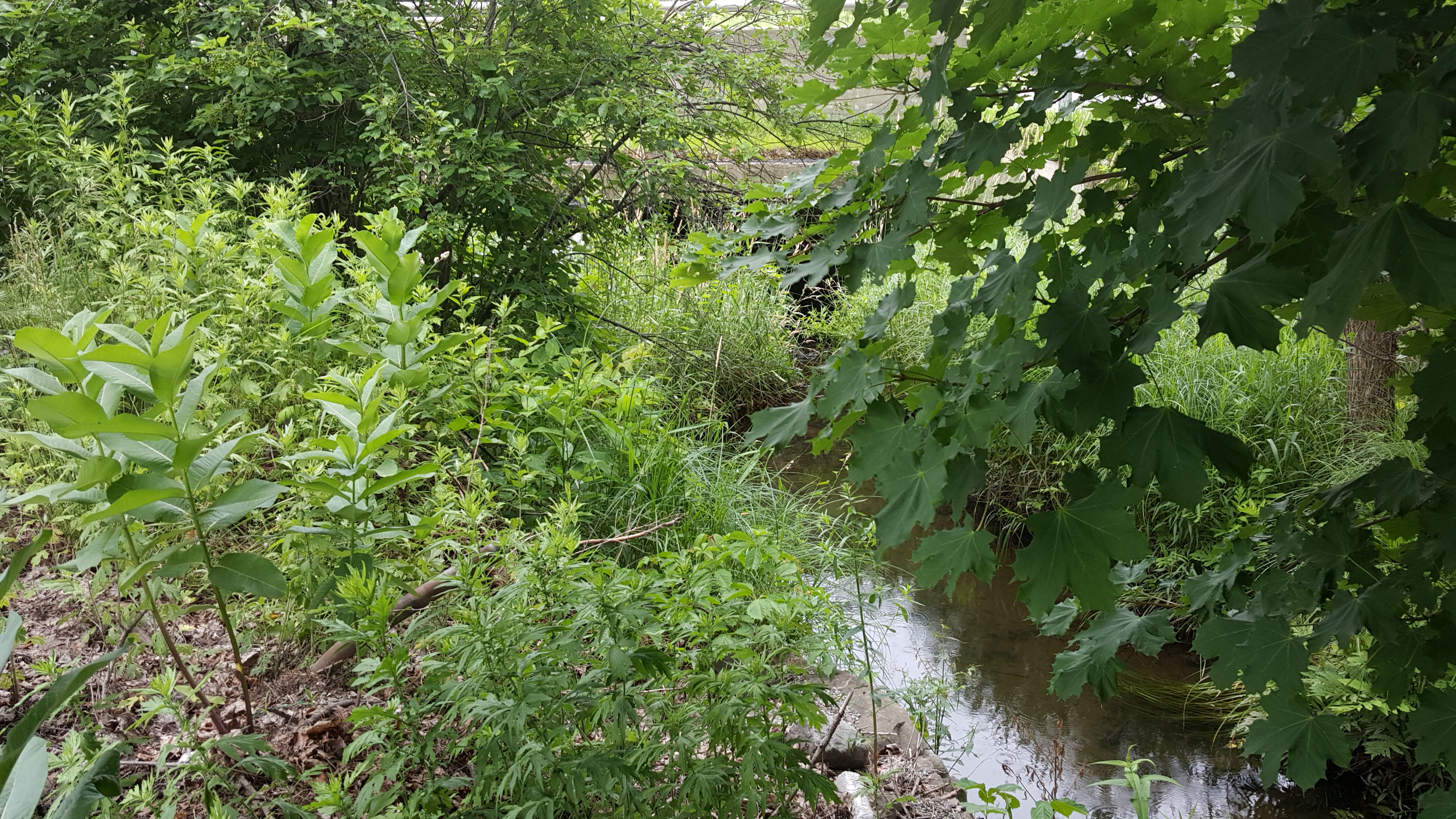
The creek before it flows under County Route 639

== See also ==
- List of landforms in Sussex County, New Jersey
- List of rivers of New Jersey
