= Wantage Township, New Jersey =

Township in Sussex County, New Jersey, US

- Township
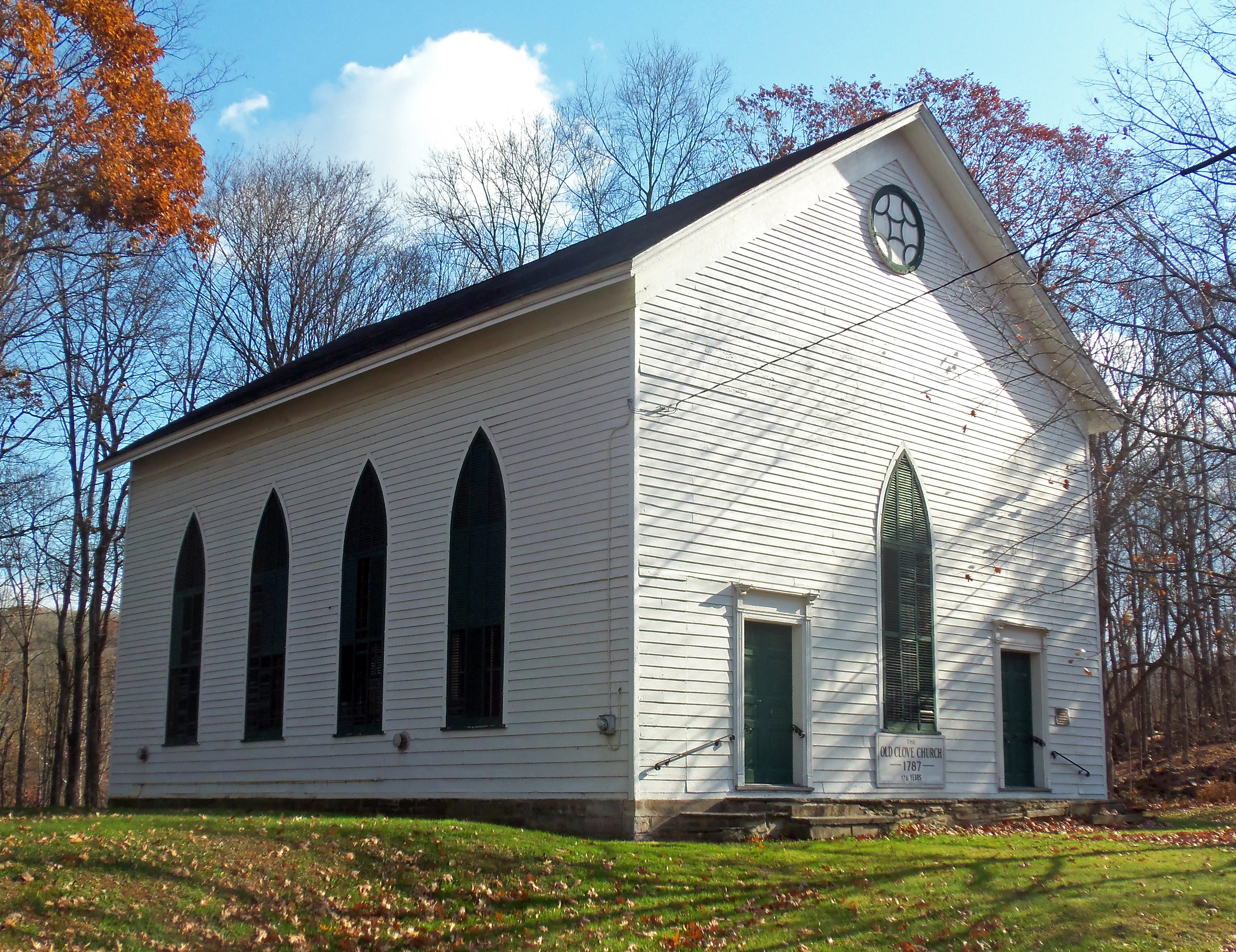
- Old Clove Presbyterian Church

- coat of arms

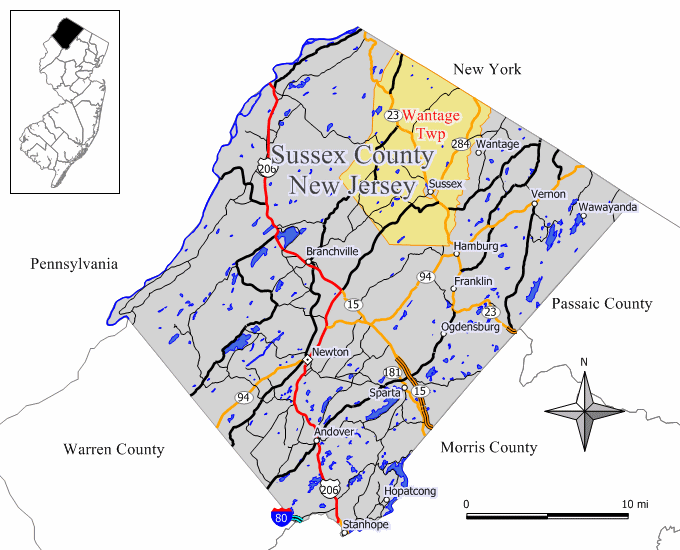
- Location of Wantage Township in Sussex County highlighted in yellow (right). Inset map: Location of Sussex County in New Jersey highlighted in black (left).

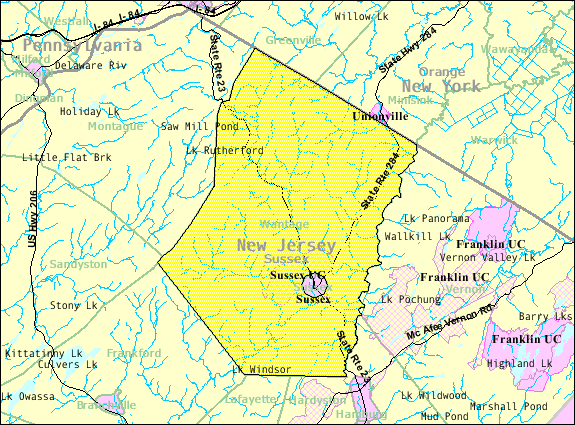
- Census Bureau map of Wantage Township, New Jersey.

- Location in Sussex County Location in New Jersey Location in the United States
- Coordinates: 41.252204°N 74.632835°W
- Country: United States
- State: New Jersey
- County: Sussex
- Formed: May 30, 1754 (as precinct)
- Incorporated: February 21, 1798
- Named for: Wantage, England

Government
  - Type: Township
  - Body: Township Committee
  - Mayor: Justin VanderGroef (R, term ends December 31, 2026)
  - Administrator: Michael L. Restel
  - Municipal clerk: Melissa Morales (acting)

Area
  - Total: 67.48 sq mi (174.78 km^{2})
  - Land: 66.76 sq mi (172.91 km^{2})
  - Water: 0.72 sq mi (1.87 km^{2}) 1.07%
  - Rank: 18th of 565 in state 2nd of 24 in county
- Elevation: 538 ft (164 m)

Population (2020)
  - Total: 10,811
  - Estimate (2023): 10,993
  - Rank: 233rd of 565 in state 4th of 24 in county
  - Density: 161.9/sq mi (62.5/km^{2})
  - Rank: 516th of 565 in state 18th of 24 in county
- Time zone: UTC−05:00 (Eastern (EST))
  - Summer (DST): UTC−04:00 (Eastern (EDT))
- ZIP Code: 07461
- Area code: 973
- FIPS code: 3403776790
- GNIS feature ID: 0882257
- Website: www.wantagetwp.com

Wantage Township (pronounced WHAN-tij) is a township in Sussex County, in the U.S. state of New Jersey. As of the 2020 United States census, the township's population was 10,811, a decrease of 547 (−4.8%) from the 2010 census count of 11,358, which in turn reflected an increase of 971 (+9.3%) from the 10,387 counted in the 2000 census.

Wantage Township was formed as a precinct on May 30, 1754, from portions of Newton Township. It was incorporated as a township on February 21, 1798, as part of the state's initial group of 104 townships. Boundary exchanges were made with Frankford Township in both 1826 and 1834. Portions of the township were taken on October 14, 1891, to form the Borough of Deckertown (renamed Sussex borough in 1902). The township was named for Wantage, England.

== Geography ==
According to the United States Census Bureau, the township had a total area of 67.48 square miles (174.78 km^{2}), including 66.76 square miles (172.91 km^{2}) of land and 0.72 square miles (1.87 km^{2}) of water (1.07%). The township is located in the Kittatinny Valley which is a section of the Great Appalachian Valley that stretches for 700 miles (1,100 km) from Canada to Alabama.

Unincorporated communities, localities and place names located partially or completely within the township include Beemerville, Colesville, Hanford, Lake Neepaulin, Lake Rutherford, Lewisburg, Libertyville, Martins, Mount Salem, Papakating, Plumbsock, Quarryville, Rockport, Roys and Woodbourne.

Rutan Hill, also called Volcanic Hill, located near the Beemerville section of Wantage Township, is New Jersey's only volcanic site that was last active over 440 million years ago.

Rivers and streams in Wantage are tributaries in the Wallkill River watershed, and include:

- Papakating Creek
- West Branch Papakating Creek
- Neepaulakating Creek, dammed to create Lake Neepaulin.
- Clove Brook, dammed to create Clove Acres Lake

The township completely surrounds Sussex borough, making it part of 21 pairs of "doughnut towns" in the state, where one municipality entirely surrounds another. Wantage borders the municipalities of Frankford Township, Hardyston Township, Lafayette Township, Montague Township, Sandyston Township and Vernon Township in Sussex County; and both Greenville and Minisink in Orange County, New York.

== Demographics ==
Historical population
| Census | Pop. | Note | %± |
|---|---|---|---|
| 1810 | 2,969 | | — |
| 1820 | 3,307 | | 11.4% |
| 1830 | 4,034 | | 22.0% |
| 1840 | 3,908 | | −3.1% |
| 1850 | 3,934 | | 0.7% |
| 1860 | 3,862 | | −1.8% |
| 1870 | 3,636 | | −5.9% |
| 1880 | 3,361 | | −7.6% |
| 1890 | 3,412 | | 1.5% |
| 1900 | 2,217 | * | −35.0% |
| 1910 | 2,077 | | −6.3% |
| 1920 | 1,898 | | −8.6% |
| 1930 | 2,075 | | 9.3% |
| 1940 | 2,376 | | 14.5% |
| 1950 | 2,543 | | 7.0% |
| 1960 | 3,308 | | 30.1% |
| 1970 | 4,329 | | 30.9% |
| 1980 | 7,268 | | 67.9% |
| 1990 | 9,487 | | 30.5% |
| 2000 | 10,387 | | 9.5% |
| 2010 | 11,358 | | 9.3% |
| 2020 | 10,811 | | −4.8% |
| 2023 (est.) | 10,993 | | 1.7% |
Population sources: 1810–1920 1840; 1850–1870 1850 1870; 1880–1890 1890–1910 1910–1930; 1940–2000 2000; 2010 2020 * = Lost territory in previous decade.

=== 2010 census ===
The 2010 United States census counted 11,358 people, 3,910 households, and 3,116 families in the township. The population density was 170.1 per square mile (65.7/km^{2}). There were 4,173 housing units at an average density of 62.5 per square mile (24.1/km^{2}). The racial makeup was 95.23% (10,816) White, 1.21% (137) Black or African American, 0.11% (13) Native American, 0.99% (113) Asian, 0.00% (0) Pacific Islander, 0.93% (106) from other races, and 1.52% (173) from two or more races. Hispanic or Latino of any race were 5.23% (594) of the population.

Of the 3,910 households, 34.7% had children under the age of 18; 66.8% were married couples living together; 8.5% had a female householder with no husband present and 20.3% were non-families. Of all households, 15.8% were made up of individuals and 6.4% had someone living alone who was 65 years of age or older. The average household size was 2.90 and the average family size was 3.25.

25.0% of the population were under the age of 18, 8.5% from 18 to 24, 22.5% from 25 to 44, 32.2% from 45 to 64, and 11.8% who were 65 years of age or older. The median age was 41.2 years. For every 100 females, the population had 98.6 males. For every 100 females ages 18 and older there were 96.7 males.

The Census Bureau's 2006–2010 American Community Survey showed that (in 2010 inflation-adjusted dollars) median household income was $72,270 (with a margin of error of +/− $7,478) and the median family income was $78,934 (+/− $9,462). Males had a median income of $55,509 (+/− $8,605) versus $41,013 (+/− $3,999) for females. The per capita income for the borough was $29,266 (+/− $2,047). About 4.3% of families and 3.5% of the population were below the poverty line, including 4.0% of those under age 18 and 5.3% of those age 65 or over.

=== 2000 census ===
As of the 2000 United States census there were 10,387 people, 3,441 households, and 2,856 families residing in the township. The population density was 154.8 inhabitants per square mile (59.8/km^{2}). There were 3,663 housing units at an average density of 54.6 per square mile (21.1/km^{2}). The racial makeup of the township was 97.10% White, 0.65% African American, 0.06% Native American, 0.67% Asian, 0.01% Pacific Islander, 0.41% from other races, and 1.10% from two or more races. Hispanic or Latino of any race were 2.89% of the population.

There were 3,441 households, out of which 43.6% had children under the age of 18 living with them, 71.5% were married couples living together, 8.0% had a female householder with no husband present, and 17.0% were non-families. 13.6% of all households were made up of individuals, and 5.0% had someone living alone who was 65 years of age or older. The average household size was 3.02 and the average family size was 3.33.

In the township the population was spread out, with 29.4% under the age of 18, 7.1% from 18 to 24, 30.0% from 25 to 44, 24.8% from 45 to 64, and 8.8% who were 65 years of age or older. The median age was 36 years. For every 100 females, there were 96.9 males. For every 100 females age 18 and over, there were 96.0 males.

The median income for a household in the township was $58,440, and the median income for a family was $65,339. Males had a median income of $42,697 versus $30,160 for females. The per capita income for the township was $22,488. About 4.2% of families and 4.9% of the population were below the poverty line, including 5.7% of those under age 18 and 5.2% of those age 65 or over.

== Government ==
=== Local government ===
Wantage Township is governed under the Township form of New Jersey municipal government, one of 141 municipalities (of the 564) statewide that use this form, the second-most commonly used form of government in the state. The governing body is comprised of the Township Committee, whose three members are elected directly by the voters at-large in partisan elections to serve three-year terms of office on a staggered basis, with one seat coming up for election each year as part of the November general election in a three-year cycle. At an annual reorganization meeting, the Township Committee selects one of its members to serve as Mayor and another as Deputy Mayor.

As of 2024, members of the Wantage Township Committee are Mayor William Gaechter (R, term on committee and as mayor ends December 31, 2024), Deputy Mayor Ronald Bassani (R, term on committee ends 2025; term as deputy mayor ends 2024) and Justin VanderGroef (R, 2026).

=== Federal, state and county representation ===
Wantage Township is located in the 5th Congressional District and is part of New Jersey's 24th state legislative district.

For the 119th United States Congress, New Jersey's 5th congressional district is represented by Josh Gottheimer (D, Wyckoff). New Jersey is represented in the United States Senate by Democrats Cory Booker (Newark, term ends 2027) and Andy Kim (Moorestown, term ends 2031).

For the 2026–2027 session, the 24th legislative district of the New Jersey Legislature is represented in the State Senate by Parker Space (R, Wantage Township) and in the General Assembly by Dawn Fantasia (R, Franklin) and Mike Inganamort (R, Chester Township).

Sussex County is governed by a Board of County Commissioners whose five members are elected at-large in partisan elections on a staggered basis, with either one or two seats coming up for election each year. At an annual reorganization meeting held in the beginning of January, the board selects a Commissioner Director and Deputy Director from among its members, with day-to-day supervision of the operation of the county delegated to a County Administrator. As of 2025, Sussex County's Commissioners are Director Jill Space (R, Wantage Township, 2025), Deputy Director Chris Carney (R, Frankford Township, 2027), Jack DeGroot (R, Sussex, 2026), William Hayden (I, Branchville, 2025) and Alan Henderson (R, Lafayette Township, 2027).

Constitutional officers elected on a countywide basis are Clerk Jeffrey M. Parrott (R, Wantage Township, 2026), Sheriff Michael F. Strada (R, Hampton Township, 2025) and Surrogate Gary R. Chiusano (R, Frankford Township, 2028).

=== Politics ===
As of March 2011, there were a total of 7,397 registered voters in Wantage Township, of which 969 (13.1% vs. 16.5% countywide) were registered as Democrats, 3,315 (44.8% vs. 39.3%) were registered as Republicans and 3,104 (42.0% vs. 44.1%) were registered as Unaffiliated. There were 9 voters registered as Libertarians or Greens. Among the township's 2010 Census population, 65.1% (vs. 65.8% in Sussex County) were registered to vote, including 86.8% of those ages 18 and over (vs. 86.5% countywide).

Gubernatorial election results for Wantage Township
| Year | Republican | | Democratic | | Third party(ies) | |
| Year | No. | % | No. | % | No. | % |
|---|---|---|---|---|---|---|
| 2025 | 3,299 | 67.80% | 1,543 | 31.71% | 24 | 0.49% |
| 2021 | 3,139 | 74.76% | 1,011 | 24.08% | 49 | 1.17% |
| 2017 | 2,019 | 64.40% | 960 | 30.62% | 156 | 4.98% |
| 2013 | 2,107 | 70.05% | 812 | 26.99% | 89 | 2.96% |
| 2009 | 2,602 | 64.28% | 999 | 24.68% | 447 | 11.04% |
| 2005 | 1,868 | 60.93% | 1,060 | 34.57% | 138 | 4.50% |

In the 2012 presidential election, Republican Mitt Romney received 3,269 votes (62.8% vs. 59.4% countywide), ahead of Democrat Barack Obama with 1,800 votes (34.6% vs. 38.2%) and other candidates with 119 votes (2.3% vs. 2.1%), among the 5,203 ballots cast by the township's 7,467 registered voters, for a turnout of 69.7% (vs. 68.3% in Sussex County). In the 2008 presidential election, Republican John McCain received 3,454 votes (62.2% vs. 59.2% countywide), ahead of Democrat Barack Obama with 1,987 votes (35.8% vs. 38.7%) and other candidates with 74 votes (1.3% vs. 1.5%), among the 5,551 ballots cast by the township's 7,319 registered voters, for a turnout of 75.8% (vs. 76.9% in Sussex County). In the 2004 presidential election, Republican George W. Bush received 3,300 votes (67.0% vs. 63.9% countywide), ahead of Democrat John Kerry with 1,564 votes (31.7% vs. 34.4%) and other candidates with 48 votes (1.0% vs. 1.3%), among the 4,928 ballots cast by the township's 6,500 registered voters, for a turnout of 75.8% (vs. 77.7% in the whole county).

United States presidential election results for Wantage Township 2024 2020 2016 2012 2008 2004
| Year | Republican | | Democratic | | Third party(ies) | |
| Year | No. | % | No. | % | No. | % |
|---|---|---|---|---|---|---|
| 2024 | 4,567 | 70.78% | 1,785 | 27.67% | 100 | 1.55% |
| 2020 | 4,503 | 67.82% | 2,022 | 30.45% | 115 | 1.73% |
| 2016 | 3,969 | 71.24% | 1,400 | 25.13% | 202 | 3.63% |
| 2012 | 3,269 | 63.01% | 1,800 | 34.70% | 119 | 2.29% |
| 2008 | 3,454 | 62.63% | 1,987 | 36.03% | 74 | 1.34% |
| 2004 | 3,300 | 67.18% | 1,564 | 31.84% | 48 | 0.98% |

In the 2013 gubernatorial election, Republican Chris Christie received 70.0% of the vote (2,107 cast), ahead of Democrat Barbara Buono with 27.0% (812 votes), and other candidates with 3.0% (89 votes), among the 3,038 ballots cast by the township's 7,582 registered voters (30 ballots were spoiled), for a turnout of 40.1%. In the 2009 gubernatorial election, Republican Chris Christie received 2,602 votes (63.7% vs. 63.3% countywide), ahead of Democrat Jon Corzine with 999 votes (24.5% vs. 25.7%), Independent Chris Daggett with 388 votes (9.5% vs. 9.1%) and other candidates with 59 votes (1.4% vs. 1.3%), among the 4,084 ballots cast by the township's 7,192 registered voters, yielding a 56.8% turnout (vs. 52.3% in the county).

United States Senate election results for Wantage Township1
| Year | Republican | | Democratic | | Third party(ies) | |
| Year | No. | % | No. | % | No. | % |
|---|---|---|---|---|---|---|
| 2024 | 4,354 | 69.16% | 1,750 | 27.80% | 192 | 3.05% |
| 2018 | 3,082 | 68.34% | 1,205 | 26.72% | 223 | 4.94% |
| 2012 | 3,092 | 61.26% | 1,756 | 34.79% | 199 | 3.94% |
| 2006 | 1,977 | 62.62% | 1,065 | 33.73% | 115 | 3.64% |

United States Senate election results for Wantage Township2
| Year | Republican | | Democratic | | Third party(ies) | |
| Year | No. | % | No. | % | No. | % |
|---|---|---|---|---|---|---|
| 2020 | 4,296 | 65.91% | 2,044 | 31.36% | 178 | 2.73% |
| 2014 | 1,888 | 67.05% | 857 | 30.43% | 71 | 2.52% |
| 2013 | 1,363 | 69.40% | 584 | 29.74% | 17 | 0.87% |
| 2008 | 3,300 | 61.38% | 1,836 | 34.15% | 240 | 4.46% |

== Education ==
Public school students in pre-kindergarten through eighth grade attend the schools of the Sussex-Wantage Regional School District, together with students from Sussex Borough. As of the 2024–25 school year, the district, comprised of three schools, had an enrollment of 1,159 students and 112.5 classroom teachers (on an FTE basis), for a student–teacher ratio of 10.3:1. Schools in the district (with 2024–25 enrollment data from the National Center for Education Statistics) are Clifton E. Lawrence School in Wantage, with 426 students in grades PreK–2, Wantage Elementary School in Wantage, with 396 students in grades 3–5 and Sussex Middle School in Sussex, with 291 students in grades 6–8. Seats on the regional district's nine-member board of education are allocated based on the population of the constituent municipalities, with eight seats assigned to Wantage Township.

For ninth through twelfth grades, public school students from both Sussex and Wantage attend High Point Regional High School, together with students from Branchville, Frankford Township, Lafayette Township and Montague Township. As of the 2024–25 school year, the high school had an enrollment of 791 students and 67.6 classroom teachers (on an FTE basis), for a student–teacher ratio of 11.7:1. Seats on the high school district's nine-member board of education are allocated based on the population of the constituent municipalities, with four seats assigned to Wantage Township.

== Transportation ==
=== Roads and highways ===
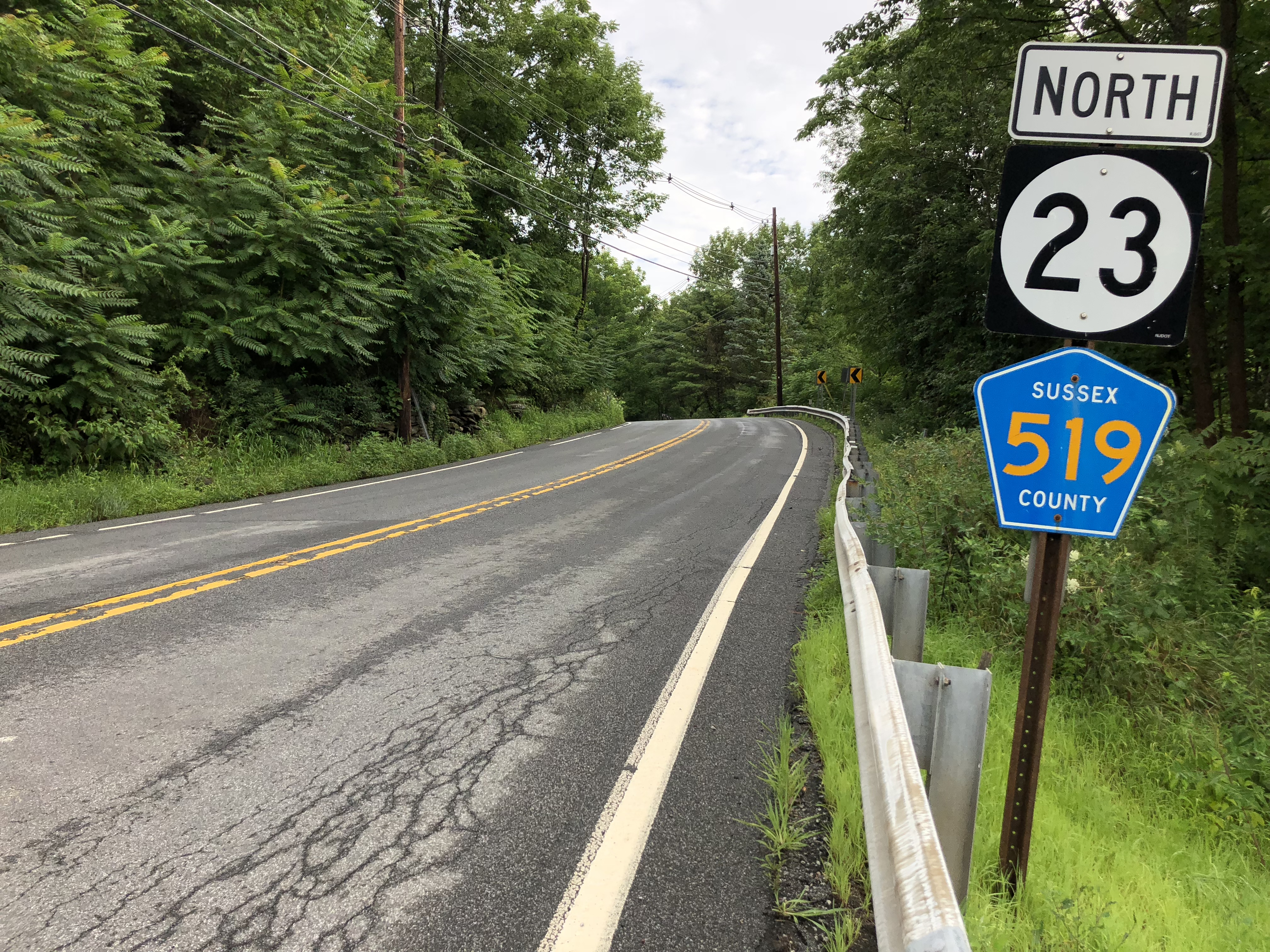
Route 23 / County Route 519 northbound concurrency in Wantage Township

As of May 2010, the township had a total of 172.15 miles (277.05 km) of roadways, of which 119.72 miles (192.67 km) were maintained by the municipality, 35.31 miles (56.83 km) by Sussex County and 17.12 miles (27.55 km) by the New Jersey Department of Transportation.

Route 23, Route 284, CR 519 and CR 565 all pass through the township. Route 284 connects to NY 284, providing access to U.S. Route 6.

=== Aviation ===
Sussex Airport, a small general aviation airport, is located in Wantage Township.

== Winery ==
- Ventimiglia Vineyard

== Notable people ==
People who were born in, residents of, or otherwise closely associated with Wantage Township include:

- Nick Boyle (born 1993), former NFL tight end who played for the Baltimore Ravens
- Lou Dobbs (1945–2024), radio and television host
- Scott Garrett (born 1959), former U.S. Representative for New Jersey's 5th congressional district, served from 2003 to 2017
- Hugh Judson Kilpatrick (1836–1881), Union Army officer during the American Civil War, achieving the rank of brevet major general
- Britt Linn (born 1990), Playboy Playmate in the March 2014 issue
- Parker Space (born 1968), politician who has represented the 24th Legislative District since 2024 and served as Mayor of Wantage Township in 2005 and 2008–2009
- Moses D. Stivers (1828–1895), businessman and politician who served one term representing New York's 15th congressional district from 1889 to 1891
- Hal Wirths (born 1965), politician who represented the 24th Legislative District in the New Jersey General Assembly from 2018 to 2024
