= West Branch Papakating Creek =

Stream in the U.S. state of New Jersey

Coordinates: 41°11′17″N 74°37′57″W

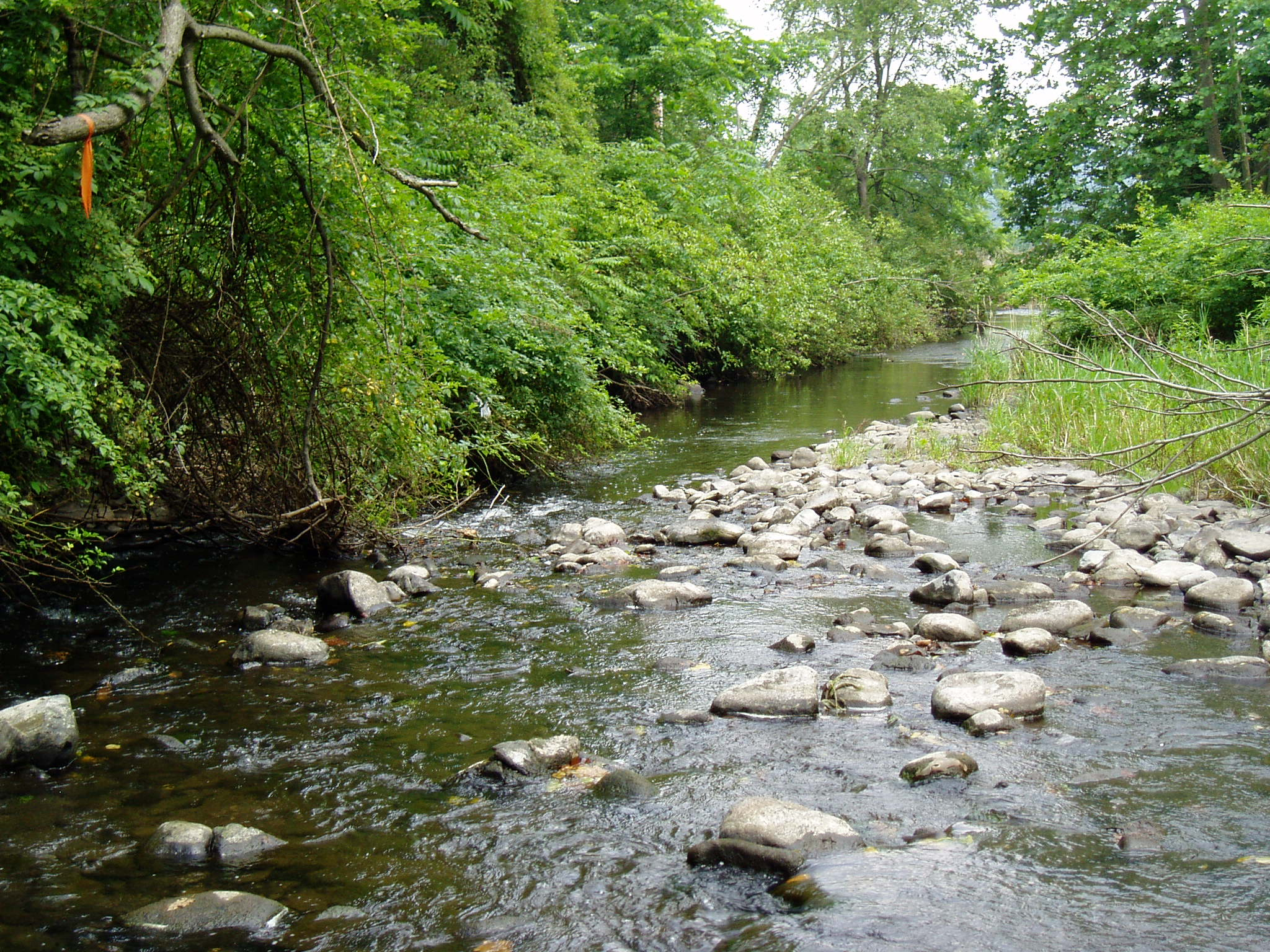
West Branch Papakating Creek near its mouth in Wantage Township, New Jersey

West Branch Papakating Creek is a tributary of Papakating Creek located in Frankford and Wantage townships in Sussex County, in the U.S. state of New Jersey. It covers a drainage area of 11.3 square miles (29 km^{2}).

== See also ==
- Clove Brook
- Neepaulakating Creek
- Wallkill River
- List of rivers in New Jersey
