= Quarryville, New Jersey =

Populated place in Sussex County, New Jersey, US

- Unincorporated community
- Location of Quarryville in Sussex County. Inset: Location of Sussex County within the state of New Jersey Quarryville, New Jersey (New Jersey) Quarryville, New Jersey (the United States)
- Coordinates: 41°15′23″N 74°34′47″W
- Country: United States
- State: New Jersey
- County: Sussex
- Township: Wantage
- Elevation: 554 ft (169 m)
- Time zone: UTC−05:00 (Eastern (EST))
  - Summer (DST): UTC−04:00 (EDT)
- GNIS feature ID: 879565

Quarryville is an unincorporated community located within Wantage Township in Sussex County, in the U.S. state of New Jersey.

The settlement is located on Quarryville Brook, a tributary of the Wallkill River.

By 1882, "Quarry Station" was located in the settlement, part of the New Jersey Midland Railway, which later became the New York, Susquehanna and Western Railway. A post office was located there, and the population was 64. The settlement was described as having "a large local trade, a good shipping trade, and quarries of superior building stone".
