= Great Appalachian Valley =

Major landform in eastern North America

Coordinates: 39°30′N 77°50′W

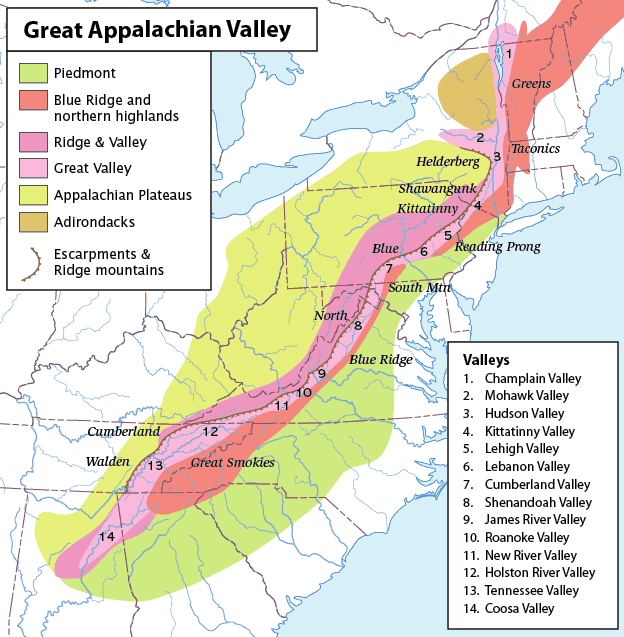
A map of the Appalachian Mountains and the Great Appalachian Valley, stretching from Quebec in the north to Alabama in the south

The Great Appalachian Valley, also called The Great Valley or Great Valley Region, is one of the major landform features of eastern North America. It is a gigantic trough, including a chain of valley lowlands, and the central feature of the Appalachian Mountains system. The trough stretches about 1,200 miles (1,900 km) from Quebec in the north to Alabama in the south and has been an important north–south route of travel since prehistoric times.

== Geography ==
The Great Valley marks the eastern edge of the Ridge and Valley physiographic province. There are many regional names of the Great Valley, such as the Shenandoah Valley. From a large perspective the Great Valley can be divided into a northern section and a southern section.

=== Northern section ===
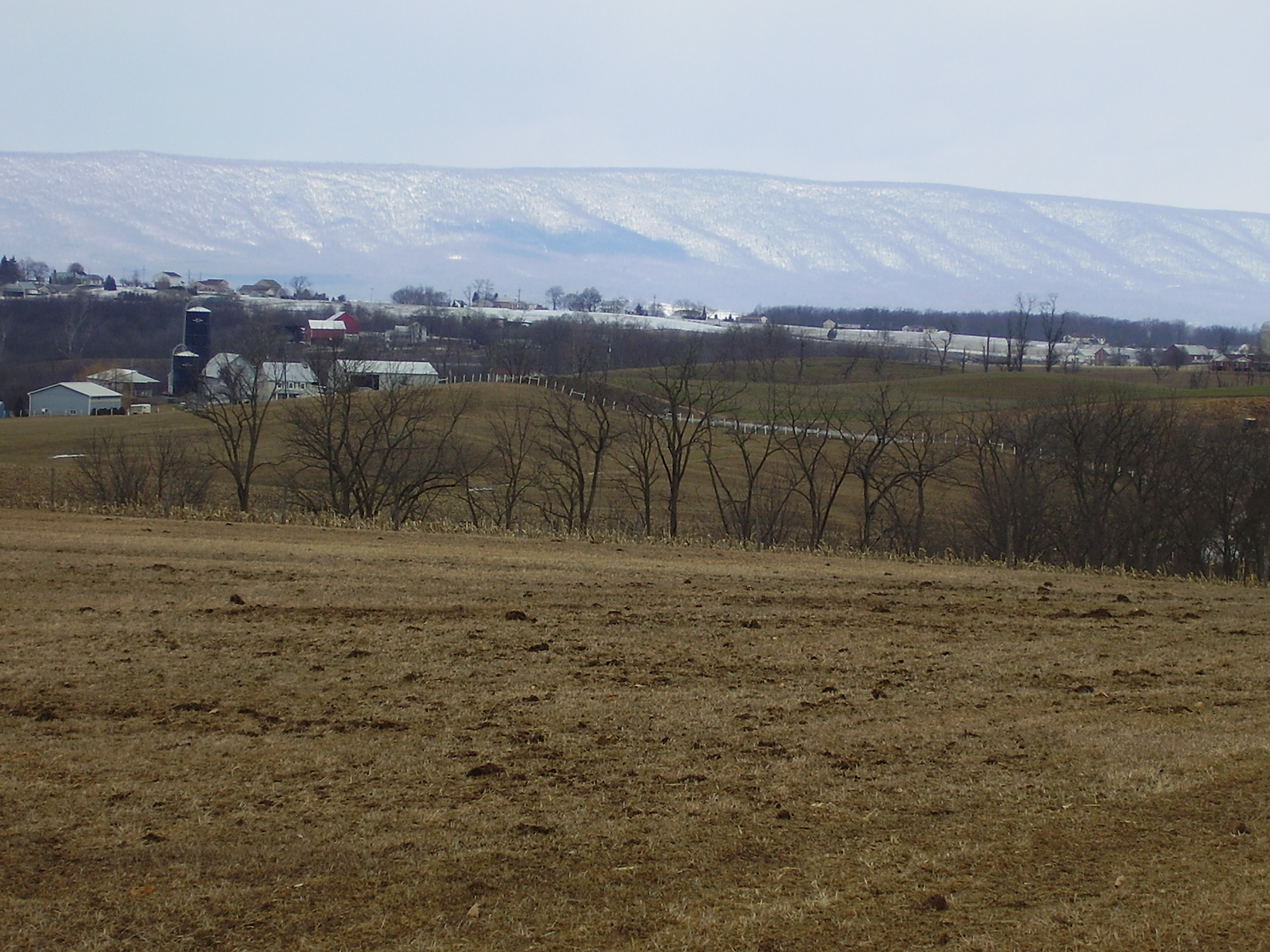
Blue Mountain in the Lehigh Valley region of eastern Pennsylvania

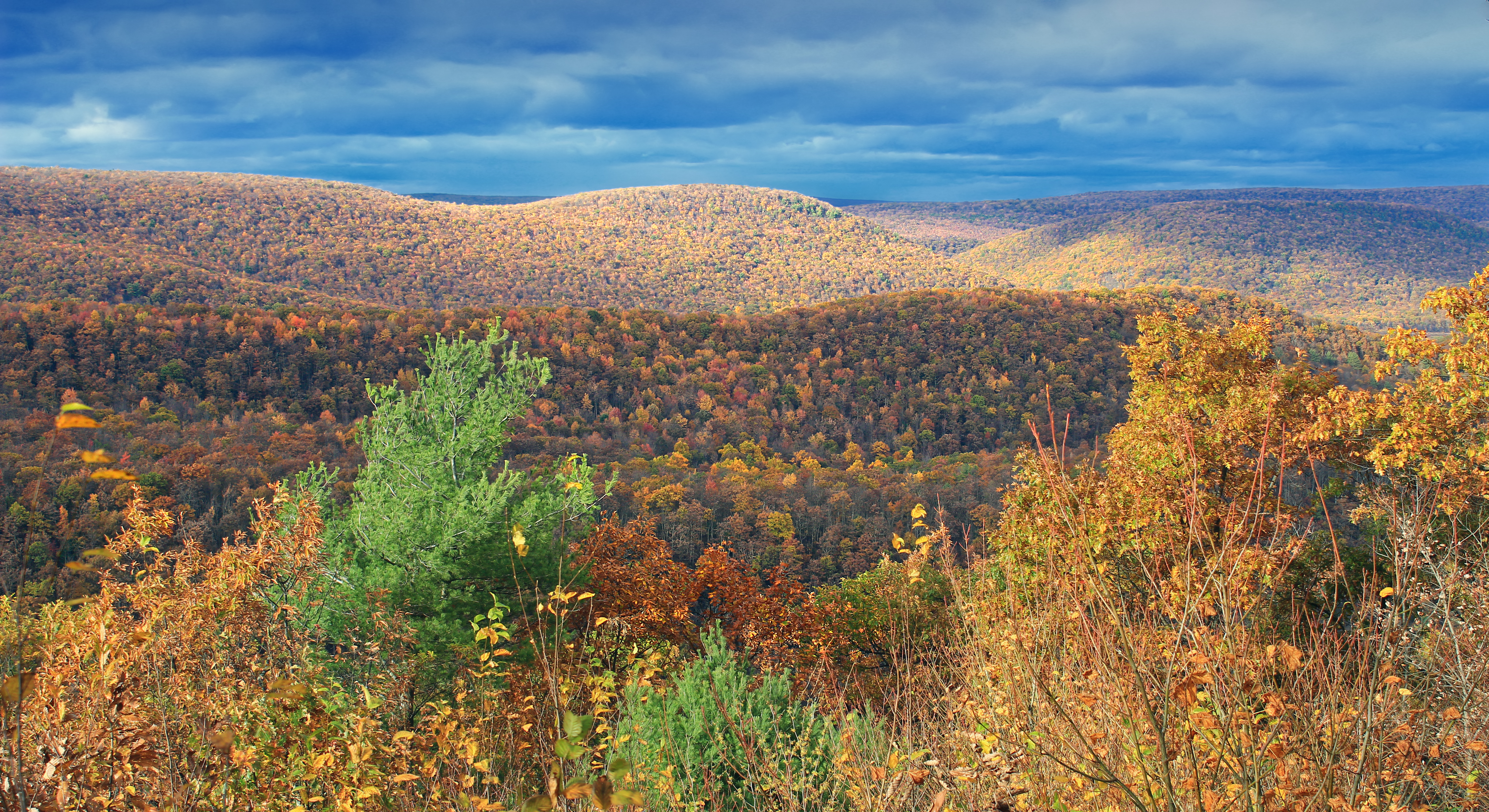
Bald Eagle State Forest in Union County, Pennsylvania

In its northern section, the Great Valley includes the Champlain Valley around Lake Champlain and the upper Richelieu River that drains it into the Saint Lawrence, the Hudson River Valley, Newburgh Valley, and Wallkill Valley, and the Kittatinny Valley, Upper Delaware River Valley, Lebanon Valley, and Cumberland Valley.

A series of mountains bounds the northern half of the Great Valley on both sides. To the east or coastward side, these include, from north to south, the Green Mountains of Vermont, the Taconic Mountains of Vermont, New York, Massachusetts, and Connecticut, the Reading Prong, which includes the New York–New Jersey Highlands, also known as the Hudson Highlands, Schunemunk Mountain, and Ramapo Mountains, and South Mountain in Pennsylvania beyond Harrisburg. There is a wide gap between the Reading Prong and South Mountain at Harrisburg, through which the Susquehanna River passes, connecting the Great Valley with the Piedmont region of southeast Pennsylvania. This gap is often considered the dividing point between the northern and southern sections of the Great Valley.

To the west or continental side, a series of more impenetrable mountain regions border the northern Great Valley. The northernmost is the Adirondack Mountains, a southern extension of the Canadian Shield, which reach the valley along the shores of Lake Champlain and Lake George. To their south, beyond the Mohawk Valley and Albany, New York, the Catskill Mountains, which form the northeastern terminus of the Allegheny Plateau, border the valley in the form of the dramatic Catskill Escarpment, which overlooks the middle reaches of the Hudson River and Hudson Valley. Just south of the Catskills, the first folds of the Ridge-and-Valley Appalachians border the valley, in the form of a continuous ridge (heading south) and known as the Shawangunk Ridge in New York, Kittatinny Mountain in New Jersey, and Blue Mountain in Pennsylvania. This long ridge is broken by several narrow and dramatic gaps, known as wind and water gaps, including Culver's Gap in New Jersey, the Delaware Water Gap, where the Delaware River passes into the Lehigh Valley along the border between New Jersey and Pennsylvania, and many gaps in Pennsylvania, including the Pennsylvania Wind Gap, the Lehigh River Gap north of Allentown, the Schuylkill River Gap, the Swatara Gap, the Susquehanna River Gap, and others.

=== Southern section ===
In its southern section, the Great Valley is bounded to the east by the Blue Ridge Mountains, which extend north into Maryland and Pennsylvania as South Mountain. Regional names of the southern Great Valley include Hagerstown Valley in Maryland, Winchester Valley, and Shenandoah Valley in Virginia and West Virginia, the upper valley of the James River, Roanoke Valley, and New River Valley in Virginia, the Holston River Valley in Virginia and Tennessee, and the East Tennessee Valley extending from Virginia through Tennessee to Alabama. The Coosa River Valley is often considered the southernmost part of the Great Valley. These southern portions of the Great Valley are sometimes grouped into two parts, the Valley of Virginia and the Tennessee Valley.

The southern Great Valley is bounded on the east by the Blue Ridge physiographic province, which includes, from north to south, South Mountain in Pennsylvania and Maryland, the Blue Ridge of Virginia, Holston Mountain in Tennessee, and the Unaka Range and the Great Smoky Mountains of Tennessee and North Carolina. A gap in these mountains exists near Roanoke, Virginia. Other gaps of note in the Blue Ridge of Virginia, connecting the Piedmont region with the Great Valley, include Thornton Gap, Swift Run Gap, and Rockfish Gap.

Another series of mountains bounds the southern Great Valley to the west, including North Mountain and Great North Mountain, the Allegheny Front, Powell Mountain, the Cumberland Mountains, Walden Ridge, and the Cumberland Plateau. The Cumberland Gap connects the Great Valley region with Kentucky and Tennessee lands to the west. Massanutten Mountain lies in the middle of the Valley of Virginia portion of the Great Valley. The Valley of Virginia is a region of karst, with sinkholes and caverns.

=== Climate ===
The climate of the Great Valley is generally Warm- or Hot-summer Humid continental in the northern third and Humid subtropical from Pennsylvania southward. The first weather box is from the temperate portion and the second subtropical portion of the valley.

Climate data for Albany International Airport, New York (1981–2010 normals, (Note: Mean monthly maxima and minima (i.e. the expected highest and lowest temperature readings at any point during the year or given month) calculated based on data at said location from 1981 to 2010.) (Note: According to the National Weather Service, the snowfall data has been readjusted as of June 3, 2015. As such, snowfall data is based the source at Albany Snowfall Normals) extremes 1874–present (Note: Official records for Albany kept January 1874 to May 1938 at downtown and at Albany Int'l since June 1938. For more information, see Threadex))
Month	Jan	Feb	Mar	Apr	May	Jun	Jul	Aug	Sep	Oct	Nov	Dec	Year
Record high °F (°C)	71 (22)	74 (23)	89 (32)	93 (34)	97 (36)	100 (38)	104 (40)	102 (39)	100 (38)	91 (33)	82 (28)	72 (22)	104 (40)
Mean maximum °F (°C)	52.8 (11.6)	53.5 (11.9)	68.2 (20.1)	81.6 (27.6)	86.7 (30.4)	91.1 (32.8)	92.3 (33.5)	91.2 (32.9)	86.0 (30.0)	76.8 (24.9)	68.1 (20.1)	54.8 (12.7)	94.3 (34.6)
Mean daily maximum °F (°C)	30.6 (−0.8)	34.6 (1.4)	44.4 (6.9)	58.3 (14.6)	69.4 (20.8)	77.9 (25.5)	82.3 (27.9)	80.4 (26.9)	72.2 (22.3)	59.8 (15.4)	47.9 (8.8)	35.8 (2.1)	57.9 (14.4)
Mean daily minimum °F (°C)	14.5 (−9.7)	17.3 (−8.2)	25.7 (−3.5)	37.3 (2.9)	47.1 (8.4)	56.5 (13.6)	61.4 (16.3)	59.9 (15.5)	51.6 (10.9)	39.6 (4.2)	31.5 (−0.3)	21.2 (−6.0)	38.7 (3.7)
Mean minimum °F (°C)	−7.1 (−21.7)	−2.8 (−19.3)	6.5 (−14.2)	23.2 (−4.9)	32.7 (0.4)	42.0 (5.6)	49.5 (9.7)	46.5 (8.1)	36.1 (2.3)	25.8 (−3.4)	15.9 (−8.9)	1.6 (−16.9)	−9.6 (−23.1)
Record low °F (°C)	−28 (−33)	−22 (−30)	−21 (−29)	9 (−13)	26 (−3)	35 (2)	40 (4)	34 (1)	24 (−4)	16 (−9)	−11 (−24)	−22 (−30)	−28 (−33)
Average precipitation inches (mm)	2.59 (66)	2.20 (56)	3.21 (82)	3.17 (81)	3.61 (92)	3.79 (96)	4.12 (105)	3.46 (88)	3.30 (84)	3.68 (93)	3.29 (84)	2.93 (74)	39.35 (999)
Average snowfall inches (cm)	17.9 (45)	12.2 (31)	11.0 (28)	2.3 (5.8)	0.1 (0.25)	0 (0)	0 (0)	0 (0)	0 (0)	0.3 (0.76)	2.8 (7.1)	13.7 (35)	60.3 (153)
Average precipitation days (≥ 0.01 in)	12.8	10.4	12.1	11.9	13.1	12.2	10.8	10.7	9.8	10.4	11.7	11.9	137.8
Average snowy days (≥ 0.1 in)	10.3	7.6	5.6	1.2	0.1	0	0	0	0	0.1	2.5	7.4	34.8
Average relative humidity (%)	71.1	68.5	64.8	61.2	65.5	69.5	70.5	74.1	75.7	72.4	73.1	73.9	70.0
Mean monthly sunshine hours	141.1	158.5	200.3	218.9	248.9	262.2	289.2	253.2	210.5	168.8	100.7	108.3	2,360.6
Percentage possible sunshine	48	54	54	54	55	57	62	59	56	49	34	38	53
Average ultraviolet index	1	2	4	5	7	8	8	7	6	3	2	1	5
Source: NOAA (relative humidity and sun 1961–1990) and Weather Atlas

Climate data for Knoxville (McGhee Tyson Airport), 1981−2010 normals, (Note: Mean monthly maxima and minima (i.e. the expected highest and lowest temperature readings at any point during the year or given month) calculated based on data at said location from 1981 to 2010.) extremes 1871–present (Note: Official records for Knoxville kept January 1871 to February 1942 at downtown and at McGhee Tyson Airport since March 1942. For more information, see Threadex)
Month	Jan	Feb	Mar	Apr	May	Jun	Jul	Aug	Sep	Oct	Nov	Dec	Year
Record high °F (°C)	77 (25)	83 (28)	88 (31)	93 (34)	96 (36)	105 (41)	105 (41)	102 (39)	103 (39)	94 (34)	85 (29)	80 (27)	105 (41)
Mean maximum °F (°C)	67.2 (19.6)	71.3 (21.8)	79.1 (26.2)	84.6 (29.2)	87.9 (31.1)	92.8 (33.8)	95.2 (35.1)	94.6 (34.8)	91.1 (32.8)	83.7 (28.7)	76.6 (24.8)	68.3 (20.2)	96.1 (35.6)
Mean daily maximum °F (°C)	47.3 (8.5)	52.3 (11.3)	61.4 (16.3)	70.3 (21.3)	78.1 (25.6)	85.4 (29.7)	88.2 (31.2)	87.8 (31.0)	81.8 (27.7)	71.2 (21.8)	60.4 (15.8)	49.8 (9.9)	69.5 (20.8)
Mean daily minimum °F (°C)	29.2 (−1.6)	32.4 (0.2)	39.2 (4.0)	47.3 (8.5)	56.2 (13.4)	64.7 (18.2)	68.7 (20.4)	67.8 (19.9)	60.4 (15.8)	48.5 (9.2)	39.0 (3.9)	31.7 (−0.2)	48.8 (9.3)
Mean minimum °F (°C)	9.6 (−12.4)	14.2 (−9.9)	22.2 (−5.4)	30.8 (−0.7)	40.8 (4.9)	52.7 (11.5)	59.9 (15.5)	59.7 (15.4)	46.2 (7.9)	32.6 (0.3)	23.6 (−4.7)	14.8 (−9.6)	5.6 (−14.7)
Record low °F (°C)	−24 (−31)	−10 (−23)	1 (−17)	22 (−6)	32 (0)	42 (6)	49 (9)	49 (9)	35 (2)	24 (−4)	5 (−15)	−6 (−21)	−24 (−31)
Average precipitation inches (mm)	4.32 (110)	4.26 (108)	4.34 (110)	4.01 (102)	4.51 (115)	3.81 (97)	5.08 (129)	3.27 (83)	3.24 (82)	2.51 (64)	4.01 (102)	4.50 (114)	47.86 (1,216)
Average snowfall inches (cm)	2.7 (6.9)	1.6 (4.1)	0.9 (2.3)	0.5 (1.3)	0 (0)	0 (0)	0 (0)	0 (0)	0 (0)	0 (0)	trace	0.8 (2.0)	6.5 (17)
Average precipitation days (≥ 0.01 in)	11.2	11.0	12.0	10.7	11.4	11.4	11.3	8.8	7.7	8.2	9.9	11.6	125.2
Average snowy days (≥ 0.1 in)	1.5	1.2	0.6	0.1	0	0	0	0	0	0	0	0.8	4.2
Average relative humidity (%)	71.7	68.0	64.8	63.3	70.8	73.5	75.7	76.3	76.1	73.0	71.8	72.9	71.5
Mean monthly sunshine hours	135.8	145.3	208.9	256.6	287.2	291.1	287.3	278.0	232.3	217.2	151.7	122.5	2,613.9
Percentage possible sunshine	44	48	56	65	66	67	65	67	62	62	49	40	59
Source: NOAA (relative humidity and sun 1961–1990)

== History ==
=== Native Americans ===
Routes through the valley were first used by Native Americans. In pre-colonial and the early colonial era, a major Indian pathway through the Great Valley was known as the Great Indian Warpath, Seneca Trail, and various other names.

=== European colonialism ===
For European colonists, the Great Valley was a major route for settlement and commerce in the United States along the Great Wagon Road, which began in Philadelphia. In the Shenandoah Valley, the road was known as the Valley Pike. The Wilderness Road branched off from Great Wagon Road in present-day Roanoke, Virginia, crossed the Cumberland Gap and led to Kentucky and Tennessee, including the fertile Bluegrass region and Nashville Basin. Another branch at Roanoke, called the Carolina Road, led into the Piedmont regions of North Carolina, South Carolina, and Georgia.

The various gaps connecting the Great Valley to lands to the east and west have played important roles in American history. On the east side, the wide gap in southeast Pennsylvania became the main route for colonization of the Great Valley. By the 1730s, the Pennsylvanian Great Valley west of South Mountain was open to settlement after treaty cessions and purchases from the Indians. The region drew a steady and growing stream of immigrants and became known as "the best poor man's country". European immigrants ultimately thoroughly settled the Great Valley in Pennsylvania and were rapidly migrating and settling southwards into the Shenandoah Valley of Virginia. The entire region between southeast Pennsylvania and the Shenandoah Valley soon became famous as a breadbasket, the most productive mixed farming region in America (Meinig, 1986:134). The road from Philadelphia west to the valley and then south through it became very heavily used and known variously as the Great Wagon Road, the Philadelphia Wagon Road, and the Valley Road. The Conestoga wagon was developed around 1725 in the area of the wide opening between Philadelphia and the Great Valley. The Conestoga wagon became the main vehicle for transportation through the Great Valley until the railroad era.

Culver Gap near Culver's Lake in Sussex County, New Jersey, was an important route through the Kittatinny Mountain from about 10,000 years ago to present. The gap is more than 400 feet (120 m) below the top of the mountain. Lenape Native Americans used the gap to hunt and trade on both sides of the mountain. Early settlers from Pennsylvania used the water drop from Culvers Lake to Branchville for a wide assortment of mills. Turnpikes followed the route of Lenape trails through the gap.

By the 1750s, the Great Valley was well-settled to the southern end of the Shenandoah Valley. Immigrants continued to travel from the Philadelphia area south through the Great Valley beyond Shenandoah, to the vicinity of present-day Roanoke, Virginia. There is a wide gap in the Blue Ridge near Roanoke. A branch of the Great Wagon Road began there, crossing through the gap east into the Piedmont region of North Carolina and South Carolina. This road became known as the Carolina Road. During the 1750s, the stream of migrants traveling south through the valley and into the Carolina Piedmont grew into a flood. At the time, the Carolina Piedmont region offered some of the best land at the lowest prices. A string of towns appeared, including Salisbury, Salem, and Charlotte in North Carolina. In the decades before the American Revolution, the Piedmont "upcountry" of the Carolinas was quickly settled, mostly by recent immigrants who migrated from the north to the south via the Great Valley. Many of these immigrants were Scots-Irish, Germans from the Rhineland-Palatinate area, and Moravians. This upcountry population soon surpassed the older and more established lowcountry population near the Atlantic coast, causing serious geopolitical tensions in the Carolinas during the late 18th century (Meinig, 1986: 291–293).

On the west side, the Cumberland Gap became the main route for migration west from the southern Great Valley to Kentucky and Tennessee. In the north, the Mohawk Valley became a major route for westward expansion, especially after the construction of the Erie Canal, which linked New York City in the east to the Great Lakes region in the Midwest via the Hudson River of the Great Valley and the Mohawk Valley gap.

=== American Civil War ===
The Great Valley, especially Shenandoah Valley, played an important role during the American Civil War, including its Blue Ridge gaps and nearby Piedmont area and its northward extension to Gettysburg, Pennsylvania, where the bloodiest and most influential Civil War battle was fought in the Battle of Gettysburg from July 1 to July 3, 1863. The Battle of Gettysburg resulted in over 50,000 casualties, but the Union Army victory under the command of Major General George Meade over General Robert E. Lee's Confederate Army forces turned the war in the Union's favor.

Civil War-era sites and events in this region include Harpers Ferry, West Virginia; Antietam, Maryland; Chambersburg, Pennsylvania; the Valley Campaign of Northern Virginia; the Valley Campaigns of 1864, also in Virginia; the Battles of Chattanooga in Tennessee; and the Gettysburg Battlefield and Gettysburg National Cemetery in Pennsylvania.

== Transportation ==
=== Interstate highways ===
Today, the main thoroughfares occupying the southern Great Valley are:

- I-81 from Harrisburg, Pennsylvania to the road's southern terminus near Dandridge, Tennessee
- I-40 from the I-81 interchange to Knoxville
- I-75 from Knoxville to Cleveland, Tennessee

In the northern valley, the thoroughfares vary. Heading northeast from Harrisburg, I-81 traces the valley to Swatara Gap, then swings north across Blue Mountain and leaves the valley en route to Scranton. I-78 then continues the route through the valley parallel to the southern slopes of Blue Mountain, connecting Harrisburg with Lebanon, Kutztown, and Allentown. At Allentown, I-78 then swings away south into the hills of the Reading Prong en route to New York City. From Allentown into New Jersey and southern New York, the valley is not traced by an interstate highway, though it is traversed at length (and at oblique angles) by both I-80 and I-84, as well as by the Delaware River between Easton, Pennsylvania, and the Delaware Water Gap.

In New Jersey and New York, the valley gradually bends from the northeast to the north, and starting near Newburgh just beyond the Hudson Highlands, I-87 runs much of the valley's length into Canada, passing Poughkeepsie, Albany, and Glens Falls. In an east–west section of the valley, I-90 traverses the Mohawk Valley towards Utica. North of Glens Falls, I-87 runs west of the valley through the Adirondack Mountains, though it descends back into the valley near Plattsburgh. At the Canada–US border, I-87 becomes Autoroute 15 and continues north to Montreal. No interstate highway crosses the rugged section of the valley east of Lake George or passes through the agriculturally rich Champlain Valley running north to Burlington, Vermont.

Heading north from Burlington, however, along the east side of Lake Champlain, I-89 runs through the valley's northernmost stretches to the Canada–US border, where it becomes Quebec Route 133 and Autoroute 35, which trace the route of the Richelieu River in its southern section, where the Great Valley finally dissipates into the plain of the Saint Lawrence River to the east of Montreal. (The Richelieu River continues northward across the plain and empties into the Saint Lawrence to the northeast of Montreal.)

== Culture ==
The Great Valley, especially the southern-middle portion, is within the region known as Appalachia.

== See also ==
- Martinsburg Formation

== General references ==
- Appalachian Topography – Paleontological Research Institution
- Appalachian Mountains – Columbia Gazetteer of North America
- USGS – Valley and Ridge Province
- Pennsylvania Geology Map
- Geological Structure of Pennsylvania
- Drake, Richard B. (2001), A History of Appalachia. Lexington: The University Press of Kentucky. ISBN 0-8131-2169-8
- Kercheval, Samuel (1850), A History of the Valley of Virginia, Woodstock, Virginia – History (much of it anecdotal) of the colonial Virginia northern frontier
- Meinig, D. W. (1986), The Shaping of America: A Geographical Perspective on 500 Years of History, Volume 1: Atlantic America, 1492–1800. New Haven: Yale University Press. ISBN 0-300-03882-8
- Williams, John Alexander (2002), Appalachia: A History. Chapel Hill: University of North Carolina Press. ISBN 0-8078-5368-2
