= Clove Brook =

Freshwater river in New Jersey, US

Coordinates: 41°11′57″N 74°36′37″W

Clove Brook is a 12.0-mile-long (19.3 km) tributary of Papakating Creek in Sussex County, in the U.S. state of New Jersey.

Clove Brook, previously known as Bastions Brook, Clove Creek, Clove River, and Deep Clove River, rises from north of Colesville and travels in a southeasterly direction, predominantly on the north side of Route 23, down through the Clove Valley toward Sussex Borough. The brook enters the north end of Clove Acres Lake, passes over the dam, and proceeds through the center of the Borough of Sussex. Leaving the borough, the brook turns south and joins Papakating Creek just north of Lewisburg. The name Bastions Brook was noted as a part of the description of a parcel of land in a deed signed by Peter Decker in the eighteenth century.

== See also ==
- List of rivers of New Jersey
- West Branch Papakating Creek
- Neepaulakating Creek
