= Kittatinny Valley =

Valley in New Jersey, United States

Coordinates: 40°59′00″N 74°51′00″W

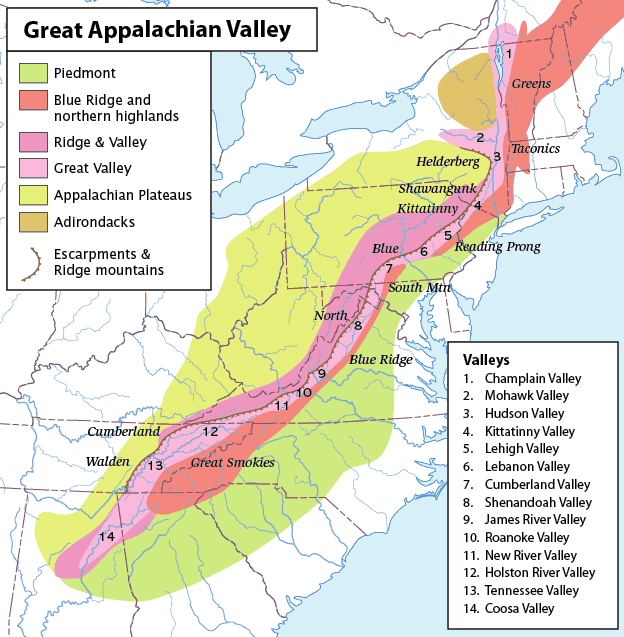
- The Great Appalachian Valley includes the Kittatinny Valley (4) depicted southeast of the Ridge-and-Valley Appalachians and between the Lehigh (5) and Hudson (3) valleys.

- Location within Sussex County, New Jersey Location within Warren County, New Jersey Location within New Jersey

Geography
- Location: Sussex County; Warren County
- Population centers: Newton
- Borders on: Ridge-and-Valley Appalachians (Kittatinny Mountain) (northwest); New Jersey Highlands (southeast); Hudson Valley (northeast); Lehigh Valley (southwest)
- Interactive map of Kittatinny Valley

The Kittatinny Valley is a section of the Great Appalachian Valley in Sussex and Warren counties in northwestern New Jersey that is bounded on the northwest by Kittatinny Mountain, and in the southeast by the New Jersey Highlands region. The valley is roughly 40 miles (64 km) long, with a breadth of 10 to 13 miles (16 to 21 km).

== Geology and geography ==
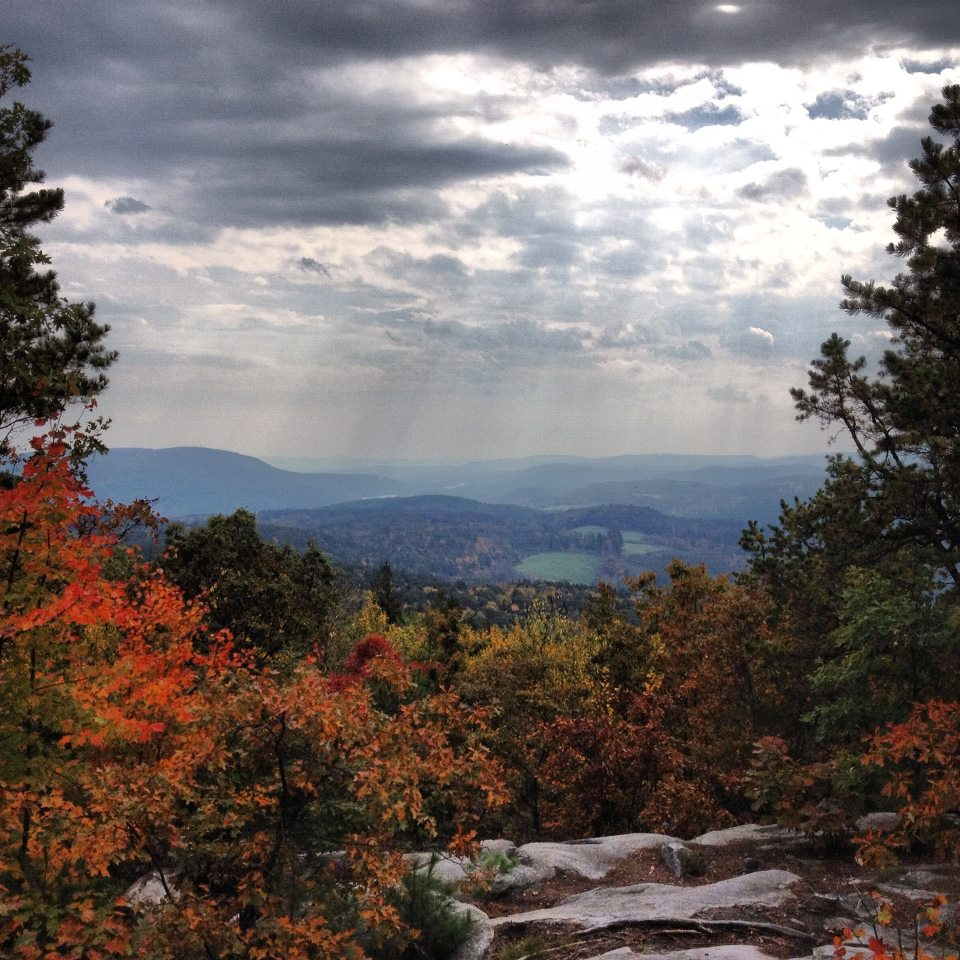
Kittatinny Valley as seen from Kittatinny Mountain in Walpack Township, New Jersey

The Kittatinny Valley is in northern New Jersey. The western side of the valley goes from the New York state line, east of High Point, and runs southwest along the base of the eastern slope of Kittatinny Mountains to the terminal moraine created by the Wisconsin Glacier just north of Columbia on the New Jersey border with Pennsylvania. This is slightly south of the Delaware Water Gap. The eastern side of the valley trends northeast along Highlands of the Jenny Jump Mountains, then along the base of Allamuchy Mountains to Andover where it follows the western edge of the Pimple Hills to the Hamburg Mountains. The eastern edge of the valley follows the western base of Hamburg Mountain to the New York State line.

North of the New York state line is the Hudson Valley. South of the terminal moraine of the Wisconsin Glacier is the Lehigh Valley. The Hudson, the Lehigh, and the Kittatinny Valleys are all locally named sections of the Great Appalachian Valley.

Sediment was deposited at the bottom of deep seas. The Kittatinny Valley was created during the late Ordovician period and the Cambrian period. This is when the volcanic island chain collided with proto North America, around four hundred fifty million BC. This is known as the Taconic Orogeny. The rock from the islands went over top of the North American plate. The sediment under the seas was compressed and formed shale and was uplifted. Thus the Kittatinny Valley was born. Then a small continent collided with proto North America around four hundred million BC. This created folding and faulting which created the Kittatinny Mountain and the southern Appalachians. The valley is situated between the Silurian Shawangunk quartz conglomerate and the lower Cambrian Hardyston quartzite.

The Silurian Shawangunk Conglomerate lies on top of the Martinsburg Formation. This is due to the quartz pebbles being transported on top of the Martinsburg shale, and then due to geologic pressure, folded and faulted. Thus the Kitatinny Mountain was born. About half of the valley is of the Martinsburg formation which is shale and slate. Some of the valley is of the Kittatinny and Jacksonburg limestones. The Kittatinny formation formed during the Cambrian period. Most of the formations are in belts traversing a northeast to southwest axis.

A volcanic breccia is located at Rutan Hill, which is along County Route 519 in Wantage Township, about five miles (8.0 km) northwest of Sussex, New Jersey.

During the Wisconsin Glacier which lasted from 21,000 BC to 13,000 BC, the valley was covered in three hundred meters of ice. The glacier melted and this created end moraines, eskers, lakes, and other post glacier formations. Lakes were also created, such as Culver's Lake, Lake Aeroflex, Cranberry Lake, and Lake Owassa. Lake Aeroflex is the deepest lake at one hundred and ten feet (34 m) deep.

The valley is drained by three small shallow rivers. The first is the Paulinskill River which flows from Newton north to Augusta, then southeast to empty into the Delaware River near Columbia. The second is the Wallkill River which starts at Lake Mohawk in Sparta. The river flows northwest. Papakating Creek and the West Branch of Papakating Creek flow into the Wallkill north of the town of Sussex. The Wallkill flows north over the New York State line and drains into the Hudson River. The third small river is the Pequest River which begins in Andover Township and flows south to Great Meadows and then flows east to Belvidere and drains into the Delaware River.

All three of these rivers are premier trout fishing streams, as they are stocked every year.

== History ==
=== Paleo Indians and Native Americans ===
After the Wisconsin Glacier melted around 13,000 BC, Paleo Indians found their way into the Kittatinny Valley around 10,500 BC. They hunted game, fished and gathered plants. The valley is fairly flat with fresh water streams which allowed for easy hunting and gathering various plants and nuts.

Native Americans came later and camped along the shallow and narrow streams. These streams allowed for easy fishing, waterfowl hunting, as well as hunting small and large game in the forests.

=== European settlement ===
Europeans settled in the Kittatinny Valley in the early 1740s. The virgin forests were cut to allow for agriculture and the selling of timber. Eventually nearly all the forest was cleared by the early 1900s. Settlers built rock walls along the borders of the properties. These rock walls can be seen everywhere in the valley. Very few of these original houses exist today because the houses were made of wood and caught fire or rotted. Some were made of stone from the nearby area.

=== Agriculture ===
The Europeans saw that the valley was flat in places, and cut down the forests to start agricultural practices. Rocks were cleared from the land and places on rock walls which served as boundary markers. Low-lying fields are left to grow grass for cows and horses. Other fields are used to grow corn for horses or cows. On a few fields pumpkins or tomatoes are grown. There are apple and peach orchards. There are also dairy farms that have twenty to seventy-five cows.

== Protected areas ==
There are several federal, state, and privately protected areas along Kittatinny Mountain and the Kittatinny Valley, including:

- High Point State Park (15,826 acres)
- Stokes State Forest (16,066 acres)
- Worthington State Forest (6,584 acres)
- Jenny Jump State Forest (4,288 acres)
- 12 state wildlife management areas (approximately 19,000 total acres)
- Delaware Water Gap National Recreation Area, New Jersey portion (31,000 acres)
- Wallkill River National Wildlife Refuge (5,100 acres)
- Swartswood State Park (2,472 acres)
- Wild and Scenic River designation Delaware River (approximately 35 miles (56 km))
- numerous natural areas and preserves managed by The Nature Conservancy and Ridge and Valley Conservancy

== See also ==
- Kittatinny Valley State Park
