= Martinsburg Formation =

Geologic formation in the eastern United States

- Stratigraphic range: Late Ordovician
- A sample of the Martinsburg shale from the Pennsylvania Turnpike (Northeast Extension) at mile post 66.
- Type: Formation
- Underlies: Juniata Formation
- Overlies: Jacksonburg Limestone and Utica Shale

Location
- Region: Virginia, Pennsylvania, Maryland, New Jersey, and West Virginia
- Country: United States

The Ordovician Martinsburg Formation (Om) is a mapped bedrock unit in Pennsylvania, New Jersey, Maryland, Virginia, and West Virginia. It is named for the town of Martinsburg, West Virginia for which it was first described. It is the dominant rock formation of the Great Appalachian Valley in New Jersey (where it is called Kittatinny Valley) and Pennsylvania (in the Lehigh Valley and Lebanon Valley).

== Description ==
The Martinsburg is defined as a gray to dark gray, and infrequently tan and purple shale and slate. Local members of impure sandstone; thin, argillaceous limestone or phyllitic shale are present in the Cumberland Valley and the Lehigh Valley.

The Martinsburg has three defined members in the Lehigh Valley: The Bushkill Member which is the basal slate unit. The Ramseyburg Member which is composed of alternating turbidite sandstone units with interbeds of shale and siltstone. And the Pen Argyl Member which is the uppermost slate unit with some minor phyllite and shale beds.

=== Depositional environment ===
The shales (and slates) of the Martinsburg were deposited in a large forearc basin resulting in a flysch deposit. This basin was the result of a deepening sea due to the closing of the Iapetus Ocean. Turbidites are common in the Martinsburg due to underwater landslides stirring up sediments and rushing down a slope. Limestones were deposited upon peripheral bulges in the deep seas. A modern analog to the depositional history of the Martinsburg might be the Australia-East Timor tectonic setting.

=== Fossils ===
In the Pen Argyl Member, both graptolites and conodonts are found. The trilobite Cryptolithus and the brittle star Protasterina are common in the Swatara Gap area.

== Age ==
The Martinsburg was deposited during the Upper Ordovician period between 457 and 445 (±5) million years ago. Near Hamburg PA, an allochthonous klippe of rocks (known as the Hamburg klippe) is a tectonic slice of Middle Ordovician sediments placed within the Martinsburg. The Martinsburg lies above and below erosional unconformities. The Shawangunk Formation, Kittatinny Formation, Tuscarora Formation, and the Juniata Formation, all lie unconformably atop the Martinsburg. Below it, the Chambersburg Formations and Myerstown Formations lie on a possible unconformity.

== Economic uses ==
Slate is still quarried out of the Martinsburg in the slate belt of Pennsylvania. Other quarries that exist in the shale partings use the rock as crushed stone for structural and other earth fill operations.

== See also ==
- Ordovician United States
- Geology of Pennsylvania
