= List of schools and school districts in Sussex County, New Jersey =

The following is a list of schools and school districts in Sussex County, New Jersey and includes both public and private schools that are currently in operation, and an enumeration of defunct institutions.

Before 1942, Sussex County had over 100 school districts. Most of these districts were in rural townships that each had several districts—and each operated a one-room schoolhouse that served their small neighborhoods. During the forty-year tenure (1903–1942) of County School Superintendent Ralph Decker (1873-?), these individual school districts were dissolved and consolidated into municipal or regional districts.

== Universities and colleges ==
- Sussex County Community College

== Secondary schools ==
=== Public high schools ===
Institution	Founded	Grades	Students (2009–2010)	Address/location	Municipalities served
High Point Regional High School	1966	9–12	1,208	299 Pigeon Hill Road; Sussex, NJ 07461 (Wantage Township) (Montague Township)	Branchville borough Frankford Township; Lafayette Township; Montague Township; Sussex Borough; Wantage Township
Hopatcong High School	1975	9–12	730	2 Windsor Road; Hopatcong, NJ 07843; Hopatcong borough	Hopatcong borough
Kittatinny Regional High School	1975	7–12	1,174	77 Halsey Road; Newton, NJ 07860 (Hampton Township)	Fredon Township; Hampton Township; Sandyston Township; Stillwater Township; Walpack Township
Lenape Valley Regional High School	1974	9–12	850	28 Sparta Road; Stanhope, NJ 07874 (Stanhope Borough)	Byram Township; Stanhope Township; Netcong Borough (in Morris County)
Newton High School	1916	9–12	826	44 Ryerson Avenue; Newton, NJ 07860 (Newton)	Andover Borough; Andover Township; Green Township; Newton (town)
Sparta High School	1959	9–12	1,218	70 West Mountain Road; Sparta, NJ 07871 (Sparta Township)	Sparta Township
Sussex County Technical School (Previously Sussex County Vocational-Technical School)	1969	9–12	528	105 North Church Road; Sparta, NJ 07871 (Sparta Township)	County-wide
Vernon Township High School	1975	9–12	1,541	1832 County Route 565; Vernon, NJ 07462-0800 (Vernon Township)	Vernon Township
Wallkill Valley Regional High School	1982	9–12	806	10 Grumm Road; Hardyston, NJ 07419 (Hardyston Township)	Franklin Borough; Hardyston Township; Hamburg Borough; Ogdensburg Borough

Prior to September 2014, Montague Township district sent students across state lines to attend middle school and high school at Port Jervis Middle School and Port Jervis High School, of the Port Jervis City School District, in nearby Port Jervis, New York. That month Montague Township's high school students began attending High Point Regional High, in a shift from Port Jervis that was to take four years to complete.

=== Private high schools ===
Institution	Affiliation	Founded	Grades	Students (2009–2010)	Address/location
Pope John XXIII Regional High School (previously Our Lady of the Lake School)	Roman Catholic; Diocese of Paterson	1956	9–12	916	28 Andover Road; Sparta, NJ 07871 (Sparta Township)

== Elementary or grammar schools (K-8) ==
=== Public schools ===
District	Municipalities served	Students (2008–2009)	Institutions (students, grades)	Receiving high school
Andover Regional School District	Andover Borough; Andover Township	675	Florence M. Burd Elementary School (355, Grades K-4); Long Pond Middle School (320, Grades 5–8)	Newton High School
Byram Township School District	Byram Township	1,119	Byram Lakes Elementary School (606, Grades K-4); Byram Township Intermediate School (513, Grades 5–8)	Lenape Valley Regional High School
Frankford Township School District	Frankford Township	658	Frankford Township School (658, Grades K-8)	High Point Regional High School
Franklin Borough School District	Franklin Borough	516	Franklin Borough School (516, Grades K-8)	Wallkill Valley Regional High School
Fredon Township School District	Fredon Township	338	Fredon Township School (338, Grades K-6)	Kittatinny Regional High School (Grades 7–12)
Green Township School District	Green Township	493	Green Hills School (410, Grades K-8)	Newton High School
Hamburg School District	Hamburg Borough	281	Hamburg School (281, Grades K-8)	Wallkill Valley Regional High School
Hampton Township School District	Hampton Township	407	Marian Emmons McKeown Elementary School (407, Grades K-6)	Kittatinny Regional High School (Grades 7–12)
Hardyston Township School District	Hardyston Township	740	Hardyston Township School (465, Grades K-5); Hardyston Middle School (275, Grades 6–8)	Wallkill Valley Regional High School
Hopatcong Public Schools	Hopatcong Borough	2,299	Hudson Maxim School (296, Grade K); Hopatcong Elementary School (323, Grades 1–3); Durban Avenue School (342, Grades 4–5); Hopatcong Middle School (569, Grades 6–8); Hopatcong High School (769, Grades 9–12)	Hopatcong High School (769, Grades 9–12)
Lafayette Township School District	Lafayette Township	290	Lafayette Township Elementary School (290, Grades K-8)	High Point Regional High School
Montague Township School District	Montague Township	292	Montague Elementary School (283, Grades K-8)	High Point Regional High School; Formerly: Port Jervis Middle School and Port Jervis High School (in New York)
Newton Public School District	Newton (town)	1,577	Merriam Avenue School (463, Grades K-5); Halsted Street Middle School (270, Grades 6–8); Newton High School (844, Grades 9–12)	Newton High School
Ogdensburg Borough School District	Ogdensburg Borough	324	Ogdensburg Public School (324, Grades K-8)	Wallkill Valley Regional High School
Sandyston-Walpack Consolidated School District	Sandyston Township; Walpack Township	160	Sandyston-Walpack Consolidated School (160, Grades K-6)	Kittatinny Regional High School (Grades 7–12)
Sparta Township Public School District	Sparta Township	3,996	Helen Morgan School (623, K-4); Alpine School (798, preschool, Grades K-4); Mohawk Avenue School (defunct); Sparta Middle School (1,008, Grades 5–8); Sparta High School (1,235, Grades 9–12)	Sparta High School
Stanhope Public Schools	Stanhope Borough	396	Linden Avenue School (18, preschool); Valley Road Elementary School (378, Grades K-8)	Lenape Valley Regional High School
Stillwater Township School District	Stillwater Township	401	Stillwater Township School (401, Grades K-6)	Kittatinny Regional High School (Grades 7–12)
Sussex-Wantage Regional School District	Sussex Borough; Wantage Township	1,534	Clifton E. Lawrence School (506, Grades K-2); Wantage Elementary School (543, Grades 3–5); Sussex Middle School (485, Grades 6–8)	High Point Regional High School
Vernon Township School District	Vernon Township	4,273	Walnut Ridge Primary School (588, Grades K-1); Cedar Mountain Primary School (401, Grades 2–4); Rolling Hills Primary School (460, Grades 2–4); Lounsberry Hollow Middle School (622, Grades 5–6); Glen Meadow Middle School (661, Grades 7–8); Vernon Township High School (1,541, Grades 9–12)	Vernon Township High School

=== Private schools ===
- Hilltop Country Day School (preschool, K-8) in Sparta Township, New Jersey
- Immaculate Conception School (K-8) in Franklin, New Jersey (affiliated Roman Catholic Diocese of Paterson)
- Northwest Christian School (K-8) in Hampton Township, New Jersey
- Reverend George A. Brown School (K-8) in Sparta, New Jersey (affiliated with Roman Catholic Diocese of Paterson)
- Saint Joseph's School (K-8) in Newton, New Jersey (affiliated with Roman Catholic Diocese of Paterson)
- Sussex Christian School (K-8) in Sussex, New Jersey

== Defunct institutions ==
The following schools or academic institutions are no longer in operation:

- Don Bosco College - a Roman Catholic seminary in Newton, New Jersey.
- Newton Collegiate Institute (also called "Newton Academy) - a private all-male school in Newton, New Jersey operated from 1851 to 1930.
- Upsala College (Wirths Campus) - a satellite campus of the private, Lutheran-affiliated Upsala College in East Orange, New Jersey.

== See also ==
- Sussex County, New Jersey
