= Sussex County Interscholastic League =

Defunct sports league in New Jersey, USA

The Sussex County Interscholastic League (SCIL) was a high school athletic conference located in Sussex County and Morris County, New Jersey. The league was formed in 1976 when a number of new high schools opened up in the previous year. The formation of the league was to promote athletics and to cut down on travel time and costs. The league operated under the auspices of the New Jersey State Interscholastic Athletic Association (NJSIAA), the statewide organization for high school sports.

In 2009, all SCIL member schools merged with other Morris County member schools to form the Northwest Jersey Athletic Conference, as a result of the realignment of conferences by the NJSIAA.

== Former participating schools ==
School	Location	School District	Team Name	General Classification	Football Classification	2006 Enrollment
High Point Regional High School	Wantage Township	High Point Regional High School	Wildcats	North 1, Group III	North 1, Group III	1035
Hopatcong High School	Hopatcong	Hopatcong Public Schools	Chiefs	North 1, Group II	North 1, Group II	594
Jefferson Township High School	Oak Ridge	Jefferson Township Public Schools	Falcons	North 1, Group II	North 1, Group II	769
Kittatinny Regional High School	Hampton Township	Kittatinny Regional High School	Cougars	North 1, Group II	North 1, Group II	635
Lenape Valley Regional High School	Stanhope	Lenape Valley Regional High School	Patriots	North 1, Group II	North 2, Group III	643
Newton High School	Newton	Newton Public School District	Braves	North 1, Group II	North 1, Group II	668
Pope John XXIII Regional High School	Sparta Township		Lions	Non-Public North A	Non-Public, Group III	649
Sparta High School	Sparta Township	Sparta Township Public School District	Spartans	North 1, Group III	North 1, Group II	835
Vernon Township High School	Vernon Township	Vernon Township School District	Vikings	North 1, Group IV	North 1, Group IV	1724
Wallkill Valley Regional High School	Hamburg	Wallkill Valley Regional High School	Rangers	North 1, Group II	North 1, Group II	629
Sussex County Technical School	Sparta Township	Sussex County	Mustangs	North 1, Group I	North 1, Group II	482

NOTE: Sussex Tech was an Associate Member

== League sports ==
The SCIL offered a total of 21 sports (12 boys; 9 girls). In the sport of swimming, Wallkill Valley and Sussex Tech competed as one team known as Wall-Tech. Additionally, Sussex Tech participated in the SCIL in bowling.

=== Fall sports ===
- Cheerleading
- Cross Country (Boys)
- Cross Country (Girls)
- Field Hockey
- Football
- Soccer (B)
- Soccer (G)
- Volleyball (G)
- Marching Band

=== Winter sports ===
- Basketball (B)
- Basketball (G)
- Bowling
- Skiing (B)
- Skiing (G)
- Swimming (B)
- Swimming (G)
- Wrestling
- Ice Hockey (B)
- Indoor Track (B&G)

=== Spring sports ===
- Baseball
- Golf
- Softball
- Volleyball (B)
- Track & Field (B)
- Track & Field (G)
- Lacrosse (G)
- Lacrosse (B)
- Tennis(B)
