= Newton High School (New Jersey) =

High school in Sussex County, New Jersey, US

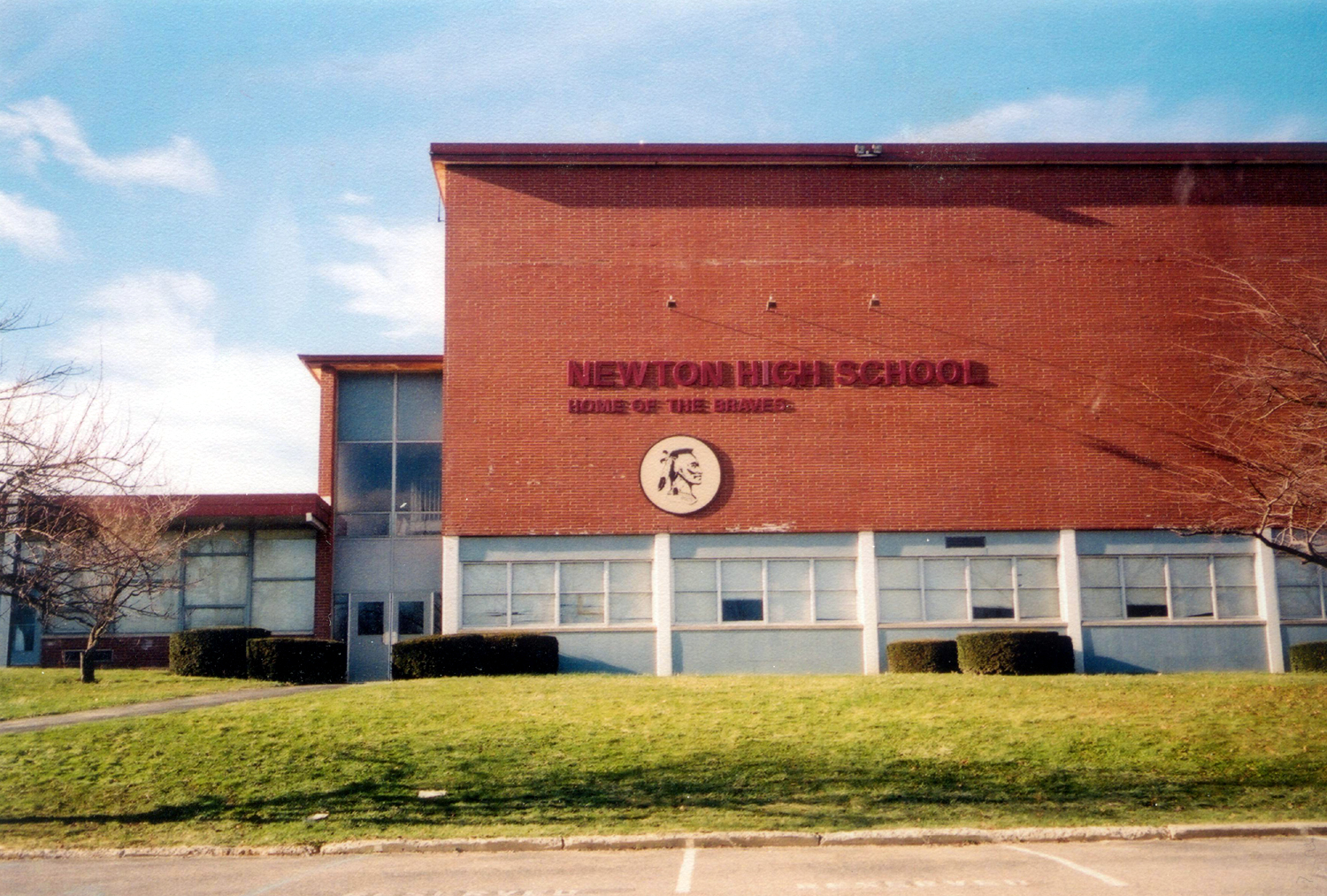

Location
- 44 Ryerson Avenue; Newton, Sussex County, New Jersey 07860; United States; 41.050515°N 74.759079°W

Information
- Type: Public high school
- Established: 1916
- NCES School ID: 341140005384
- Principal: Jon Deeb
- Faculty: 61.1 FTEs
- Grades: 9-12
- Enrollment: 680 (as of 2024–25)
- Student to teacher ratio: 11.1:1
- Colors: Maroon and white
- Athletics conference: Northwest Jersey Athletic Conference (general); North Jersey Super Football Conference (football)
- Team name: Braves
- Rival: Kittatinny Regional High School
- Publication: Calliope
- Yearbook: Aurora
- Website: www.newtonnj.org/o/nhs

Newton High School is a four-year comprehensive public high school serving students in ninth through twelfth grades from Newton, in Sussex County, in the U.S. state of New Jersey, operating as part of the Newton Public School District. Students from Andover Borough, and Andover and Green townships, attend the high school as part of sending/receiving relationships.

As of the 2024–25 school year, the school had an enrollment of 680 students and 61.1 classroom teachers (on an FTE basis), for a student–teacher ratio of 11.1:1. There were 182 students (26.8% of enrollment) eligible for free lunch and 17 (2.5% of students) eligible for reduced-cost lunch.

== History ==
Newton's residents approved a 1916 referendum to build a high school. A winning bid was accepted that year, but delays related to obtaining workers and inflated costs during World War I delayed completion of the construction. This original building is now Halsted Middle School, with a new building being constructed on Ryerson Avenue in the 1950s. Newton High School had served the region, with 13 districts paying tuition to send students as part of sending/receiving relationships.

The opening of High Point Regional High School in September 1966 ended the attendance of students from Branchville Borough, Frankford Township and Lafayette Township.

The Newton Public School District was notified in August 1974 that students from Fredon Township, Hampton Township, Sandyston Township, Stillwater Township and Walpack Township would leave Newton High School with the opening of Kittatinny Regional High School in 1975, which resulted in a drop of 400 students in the Newton district.

== Awards, recognition and rankings ==
The school was the 168th-ranked public high school in New Jersey out of 339 schools statewide in New Jersey Monthly magazine's September 2014 cover story on the state's "Top Public High Schools", using a new ranking methodology. The school had been ranked 130th in the state of 328 schools in 2012, after being ranked 167th in 2010 out of 322 schools listed. The magazine ranked the school 160th in 2008 out of 316 schools. The school was ranked 168th in the magazine's September 2006 issue, which surveyed 316 schools across the state.

== Academic achievements ==
=== SAT Scores ===
In the 2013-14 school year, Newton High School ranked second in Sussex County out of nine other public high schools in SAT scores.

=== Graduation rates ===
According to the New Jersey Herald, the graduation rate for Newton High School is 84.8%. This rate exceeds the national high school graduation rate of approximately 70%.

== Extracurricular activities ==
Newton High School offers a variety of extracurricular activities, clubs, and groups. They include Aurora yearbook, Calliope magazine, Student Council, Peer Leadership, Red Cross Club, Best Buds, Future Farmers of America, Interact, Art Club, Multicultural Club, and Spanish/German/French clubs. Honor Societies include the National Honor Society, French National Honor Society, German National Honor Society and Spanish National Honor Society. Academic Leagues include various Science Leagues (which include the physics, biology, earth science, and chemistry teams), Math League and the Academic Bowl.

=== Jazz Band ===
The Newton High School Jazz Band is considered an extracurricular, but the high school also offers Concert Band (for lower level performers) and Wind Ensemble (for more advanced instrumentalists) courses which can be added to one's school schedule.

=== Robotics team ===
Newton High School's FIRST Robotics Competition team, team 3142, won the Rookie All-Star Award in the New York City Regional Competition in 2010.

== Athletics ==
The Newton High School Braves compete in the Northwest Jersey Athletic Conference, which is comprised of public and private high schools from Morris, Sussex and Warren counties, and was established following a reorganization of sports leagues in Northern New Jersey by the New Jersey State Interscholastic Athletic Association (NJSIAA). Prior to the 2010 realignment, the school participated in the Sussex County Interscholastic League until the SCIL was dissolved in 2009. With 514 students in grades 10-12, the school was classified by the NJSIAA for the 2019–20 school year as Group II for most athletic competition purposes, which included schools with an enrollment of 486 to 758 students in that grade range. The football team competes in the American White division of the North Jersey Super Football Conference, which includes 112 schools competing in 20 divisions, making it the nation's biggest football-only high school sports league. The school was classified by the NJSIAA as Group II North for football for 2024–2026, which included schools with 484 to 683 students.

The school participates as the host school / lead agency for a joint cooperative ice hockey team with Lenape Valley Regional High School, while Lenape is the host school for co-op boys / girls swimming teams. These co-op programs operate under agreements scheduled to expire at the end of the 2023–24 school year.

=== Field hockey ===
The field hockey team won the North I Group I state sectional championship in 1976, 1979, 2014 and 2016-2018, and won the North I Group II title in 1981-1986.

=== Wrestling ===
The boys' team won the North I Group I state sectional championships in 2009 and 2010, winning against Kittatinny Regional High School both years. 2009 marked the program's first sectional title, achieved with a 40-26 win against Kittatinny. The team won its second consecutive title with a 36-28 win against Kittatinny, and made it to the Group I state championship before losing to Paulsboro High School.

Newton ranks first all-time in the number of individual state champions crowned, with 81 titles won through 2024.

=== Boys' baseball ===
- The 1985 boys' baseball team won the Group II state championship, with a 4-3 win against Shore Regional High School on a run scored in the bottom of the ninth in the tournament final.

=== Girls' basketball ===
- In 2001, the girls' basketball team took the North I, Group II title, edging Harrison High School 67-65. The 2002 team repeated the title, topping Indian Hills High School 62-56 in the tournament final. The team won for a third consecutive year in 2003, defeating Dumont High School 67-46.

=== Boys' soccer ===
- The boys' soccer team won the North I, Group II state sectional championship in 1999 with a 2–0 win over Hopatcong High School.
- The 2005 team won the North I, Group II state sectional title with a 2–0 win against Glen Rock High School.
- The 2011 team won the North I, Group II state sectional title with a 1–0 win against Mountain Lakes High School.
- The team won the Group II state championship in 2012, defeating Holmdel High School in the tournament final.

=== Football ===
The program finished the season with an undefeated 12-0 record and won its first sectional championship in 2017, with a 28-14 win against Lakeland Regional High School in the final game of the North I, Group II tournament, played at Kean University.

== Ice hockey ==
The ice hockey team won the McMullen Cup in 2013 and the Haas Cup in 2017. The 2013 team, as a co-op with Lenape Valley Regional, won the McMullen Cup with a 4-1 win against Bernards High School in the championship game played at the Richard J. Codey Arena. The 2017 co-op team defeated Vernon Township High School by a score of 2-1 at the Mennen Arena to become the first school from Sussex County to win the Haas Cup.

== Administration ==
The school's principal is Jon Deeb. Core members of the school's administration include the two assistant principals.

== Notable alumni ==
- Melkart Abou Jaoude, college football player.
- John C. Mather (born 1946), winner of the Nobel Prize in Physics in 2006.
