= Glasser, New Jersey =

Populated place in Sussex County, New Jersey, US

- Interactive map of Glasser, New Jersey
- Coordinates: 40.971492°N 74.635058°W
- Country: United States
- State: New Jersey
- County: Sussex
- Elevation: 970 ft (300 m)
- Time zone: UTC−05:00 (Eastern (EST))
  - Summer (DST): UTC−04:00 (Eastern (EDT))
- ZIP Code: 07837

Glasser is an area within the Northwood section of the Borough of Hopatcong, in Sussex County, in the U.S. state of New Jersey. While not officially a municipality, the area was granted its own post office in 1933 by the United States Postal Service that was later assigned ZIP Code 07837. Currently the area contains a small US Post Office, several residential apartments and bungalows, and a restaurant and bar overlooking Lake Hopatcong. Nearby residents get their mail delivered to PO boxes at the Glasser Post Office.

Visitors to Glasser may find a variety of different ways it's displayed on current GPS devices. In some cases it may appear as Glasser, Hopatcong, Lake Hopatcong or even Andover. A correspondence with Garmin's support explained that because of Glasser's unusual status "the street addressing is assigned to a surrounding ZIP (in this case Andover, New Jersey 07821).

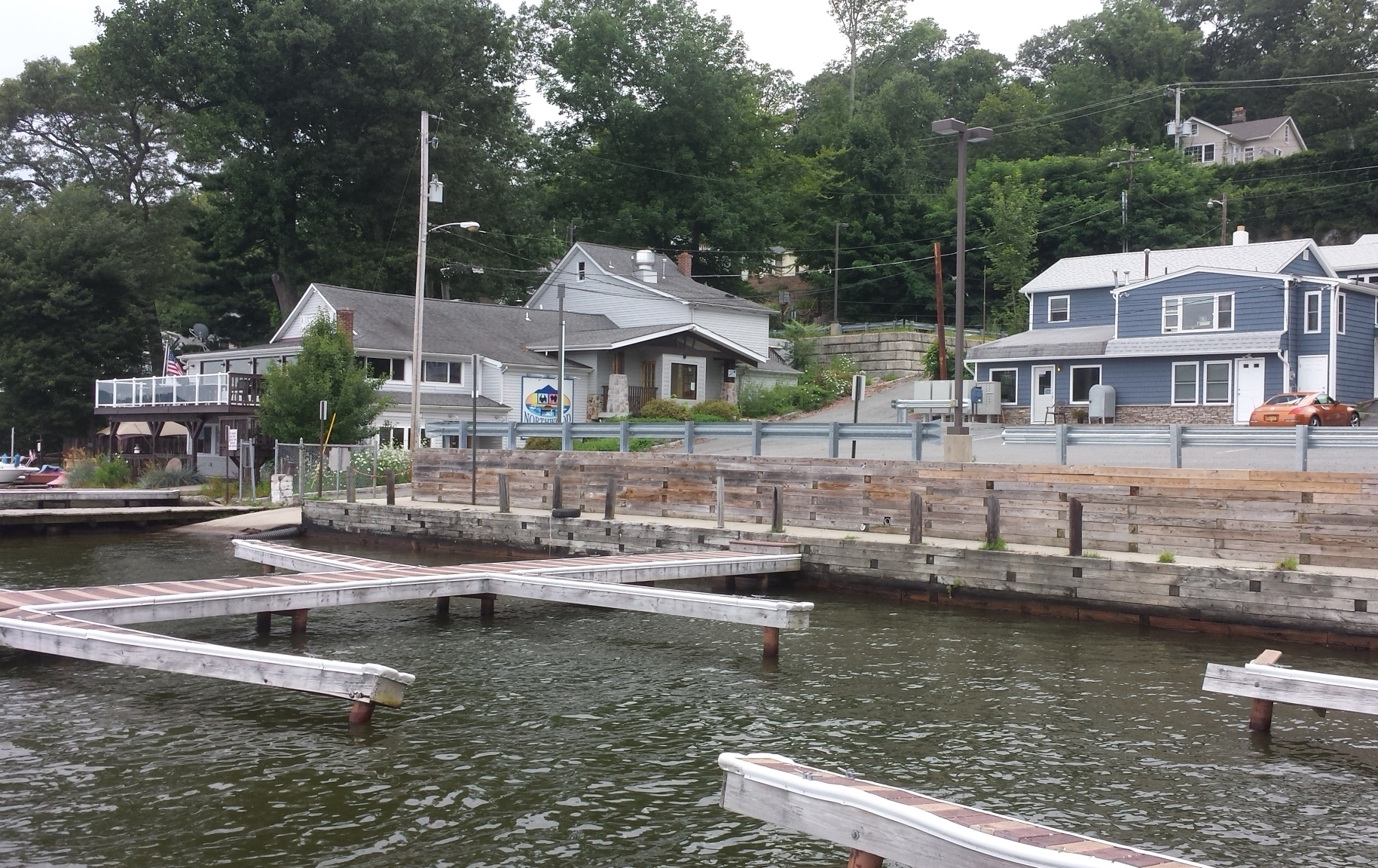
View of Glasser, NJ

== History ==
According to the New Jersey Postal History Society, "Despite the lack of an official designation, almost everyone refers to the town as Glasser, for Bill Glasser who purchased the property in 1910, said [former postmaster] Elmer Hobbs. According to the postmaster, Glasser built a general store where the post office now stands. At the time, the only post office in the area was in Landing, on the southern end of the lake. A narrow, unfinished road was the only way to get by land from one end of the lake to the other. As a service to his customers and neighbors, Glasser picked up their mail (via boat in summertime) and allowed neighbors to pick up their mail at his general store. In 1933, the post office made Glasser a postmaster because it was determined that he could not otherwise be permitted to carry mail that did not belong to him. When ZIP codes came into existence, they gave him one — 07837 — and started calling the town Glasser. "They didn't want to call it Henderson. It's a cove on the lake. The area's also known as Northwood. But there were too many Northwoods and Hendersons in the postal system," said Hobbs. The name then began showing up on maps, marked as a dot on the Sussex-Morris county border. "It's not an official town," said Rusby. "But if you have a post office, you get put on the map."

One resident who held a box at Glasser in the 1980s, Dennis Burnham, reports that when he began using a postage meter, Elmer Hobbs was thrilled because it required him to requisition the official crimping tools from the USPS, making it harder for the government to shut down a post office in which there is a metered customer. Burnham, who moved away in 1992, recalls how Hobbs once asked him to send his attractive assistant to fetch the mail on the day Charles Kuralt visited Glasser to interview Hobbs for his CBS series, "On the Road."

In 2011, news surfaced that the Post Office in Glasser may face a possible shutdown. Since that time, the United States Postal Service has kept the office open, but reduced the hours to 2 hours a day Monday through Friday and 3 hours on Saturday. They also constructed outdoor PO boxes so that the residents may get their mail outside of the new operating hours (residents of the area don't receive mail delivery and must pick up their mail from the Glasser Post Office)

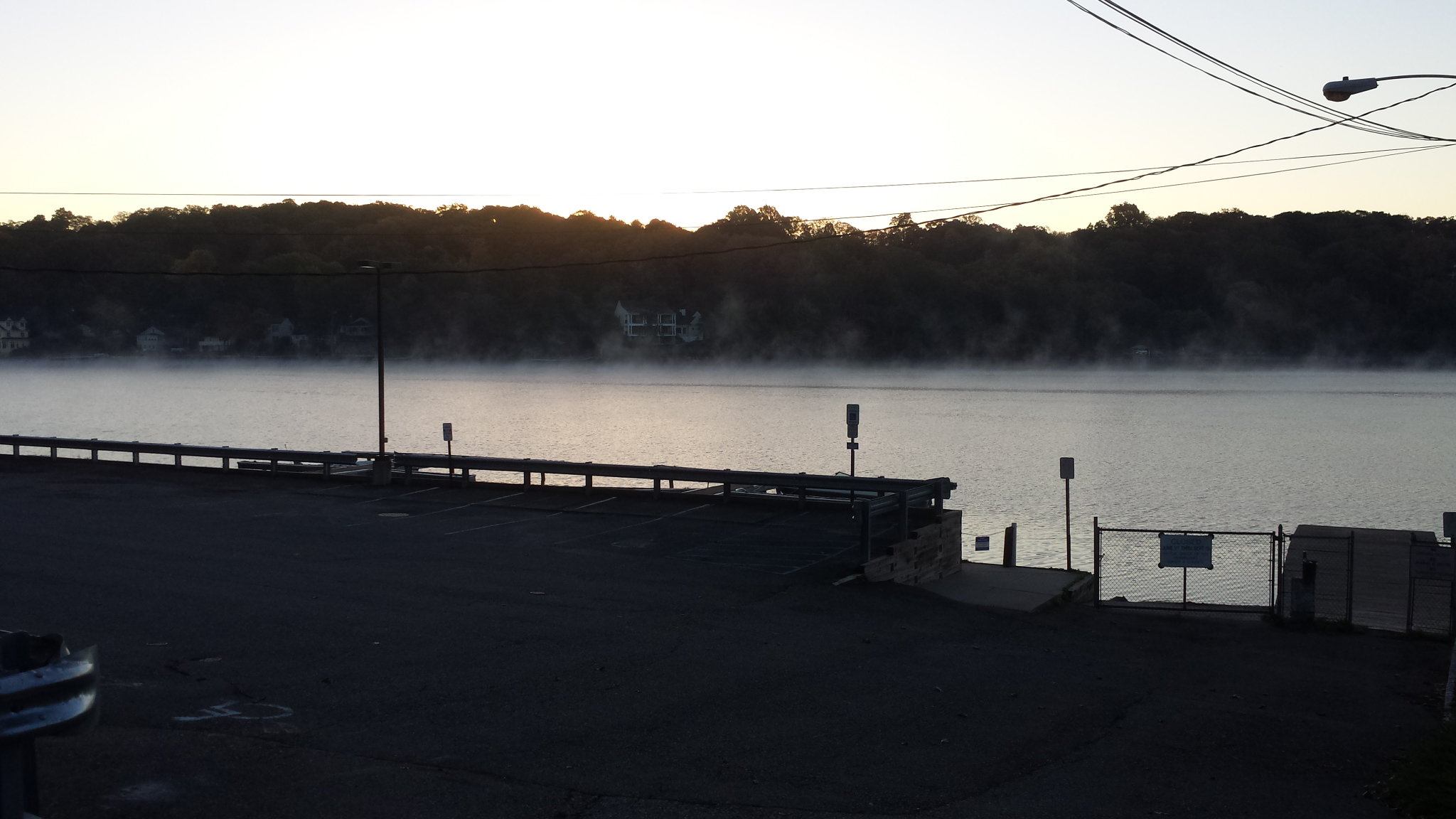
View of Henderson Cove from Glasser, NJ
