= Matt Valenti =

American wrestler (born 1984)

Personal information
- Born: April 12, 1984 (age 42) Newton, New Jersey, U.S.

Sport
- Sport: Wrestling
- Event(s): Freestyle and Folkstyle
- College team: Penn Quakers
Medal record
Men's collegiate wrestling
Representing the Penn Quakers
NCAA Division I Championships
Gold medal – first place	2006 Oklahoma City	133 lb
Gold medal – first place	2007 Auburn Hills	133 lb

Matt Valenti (born April 12, 1984) is a two-time NCAA Division I national champion wrestler from the University of Pennsylvania. He won the 133 pound weight class at the NCAA tournament in both 2006 and 2007 and finished in 5th place in 2004 at 125 pounds. He is the Roger Reina Head Wrestling Coach at the University of Pennsylvania.

== Wrestling career ==
Valenti, a Stillwater Township, New Jersey native, attended Kittatinny Regional High School where he was a two-time New Jersey state champion. He also earned a Junior National title in freestyle his senior year.

He was recruited and brought to Penn by former head coach Roger Reina, but was coached to both national titles by former coach, Zeke Jones. He wrestled at Penn with his younger brother Andy, while the youngest sibling Derek was an All-American for the University of Virginia.

Valenti currently holds Penn's career win record with 137 collegiate victories. He was a three-time EIWA champion, a four-time NCAA qualifier, and three-time first team All-Ivy selection. He was celebrated twice as EIWA Wrestler of the Year and was the Ivy League Wrestler of the Year in 2007. He was an Olympic hopeful, qualifying for the 2012 USA Olympic trials, losing in the semifinals to Olympic bronze medalist Coleman Scott. Valenti has been inducted into the Kittatinny Regional High School, Sussex County Sports, NJSIAA Region I, EIWA and Penn Athletics Hall of Fame.

He is married to Kimberly Parsons Valenti, who is the head gymnastics coach at Ursinus College.
