= Byram Township School District =

School district in Sussex County, New Jersey, US

Address
- 12 Mansfield Drive Stanhope, Sussex County, New Jersey, 07874; United States
- Coordinates: 40.936814°N 74.706216°W

District information
- Grades: PreK-8
- Superintendent: Kurt Ceresnak
- Business administrator: Theresa Radline
- Schools: 2

Students and staff
- Enrollment: 837 (as of 2022–23)
- Faculty: 74.0 FTEs
- Student–teacher ratio: 11.3:1

Other information
- District Factor Group: I
- Website: www.byramschools.org
| Ind. | Per pupil | District spending | Rank (*) | K-8 average | %± vs. average |
|---|---|---|---|---|---|
| 1A | Total Spending | $16,665 | 32 | $18,891 | −11.8% |
| 1 | Budgetary Cost | 13,419 | 34 | 14,159 | −5.2% |
| 2 | Classroom Instruction | 8,202 | 30 | 8,659 | −5.3% |
| 6 | Support Services | 2,132 | 47 | 2,167 | −1.6% |
| 8 | Administrative Cost | 1,504 | 34 | 1,547 | −2.8% |
| 10 | Operations & Maintenance | 1,454 | 37 | 1,612 | −9.8% |
| 13 | Extracurricular Activities | 97 | 44 | 104 | −6.7% |
| 16 | Median Teacher Salary | 59,870 | 31 | 61,136 |
Data from NJDoE 2014 Taxpayers' Guide to Education Spending. *Of K-8 districts with more than 750 students. Lowest spending=1; Highest=84

The Byram Township School District is a comprehensive community public school district that serves students in pre-kindergarten through eighth grade from Byram Township, in Sussex County, in the U.S. state of New Jersey.

As of the 2022–23 school year, the district, comprised of two schools, had an enrollment of 837 students and 74.0 classroom teachers (on an FTE basis), for a student–teacher ratio of 11.3:1.

The district participates in the Interdistrict Public School Choice Program, which allows non-resident students to attend school in the district at no cost to their parents, with tuition covered by the resident district. Available slots are announced annually by grade.

For public school students in ninth through twelfth grades, the township shares Lenape Valley Regional High School, which also serves Netcong in Morris County and the Sussex County community of Stanhope. As of the 2022–23 school year, the high school had an enrollment of 667 students and 58.3 classroom teachers (on an FTE basis), for a student–teacher ratio of 11.5:1.

== History ==
Students from Byram Township had attended Sparta High School until 1974, when the Lenape Valley district was created.

The district had been classified by the New Jersey Department of Education as being in District Factor Group "I", the second-highest of eight groupings. District Factor Groups organize districts statewide to allow comparison by common socioeconomic characteristics of the local districts. From lowest socioeconomic status to highest, the categories are A, B, CD, DE, FG, GH, I and J.

== Schools ==
Schools in the district (with 2022–23 enrollment data from the National Center for Education Statistics) are:

Elementary school

- Byram Lakes Elementary School with 453 students in grades PreK-4
  - Peter Morris, principal

Middle school

- Byram Intermediate School with 380 students in grades 5-8
  - Timothy McCorkle, principal

== Administration ==
Core members of the district's administration are:

- Kurt Ceresnak, superintendent
- Nancy DeRiso, business administrator and board secretary

== Board of education ==
The district's board of education is comprised of seven members who set policy and oversee the fiscal and educational operation of the district through its administration. As a Type II school district, the board's trustees are elected directly by voters to serve three-year terms of office on a staggered basis, with either two or three seats up for election each year held (since 2012) as part of the November general election. The board appoints a superintendent to oversee the district's day-to-day operations and a business administrator to supervise the business functions of the district.
