= Joe Martinek =

American football player (born 1989)

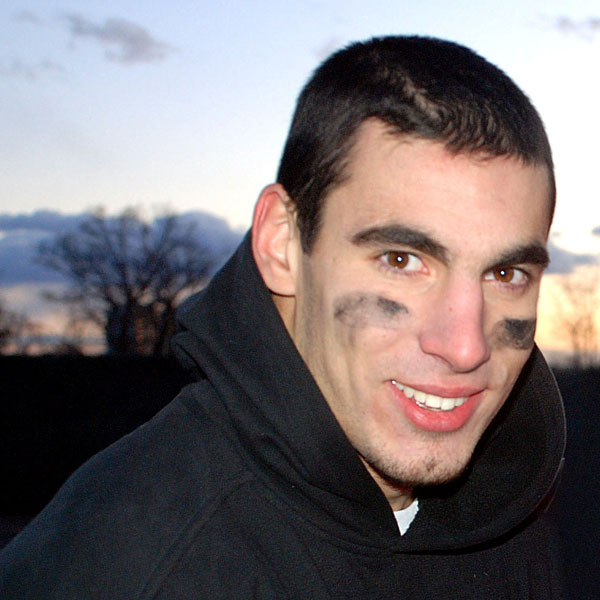

Profile
- Position: Fullback

Personal information
- Born: February 8, 1989 (age 37)
- Listed height: 6 ft 0 in (1.83 m)
- Listed weight: 225 lb (102 kg)

Career information
- College: Rutgers
- NFL draft: 2012: undrafted

Career history
- New York Giants (2012) – Offseason and/or practice squad member only; Parma Panthers (2015)

Awards and highlights
- Gatorade New Jersey State Player of the Year (2006); Became all-time HS leader in New Jersey state history with 7,589 rushing yards and 80 touchdowns (2006)

"Jersey" Joe Martinek (born February 8, 1989) is an American former football fullback. He is the all-time high school leading rusher in New Jersey state history with 7,589 yards and was a running back at Rutgers. He was signed as an undrafted free agent by the New York Giants after the 2012 NFL draft. Joe then played professionally in the Italian Football League for the Parma Panthers.

== High school ==
Martinek was an average athlete at Hopatcong High School in Hopatcong, New Jersey, playing American football and track & field. As a senior running back at Hopatcong High School, Martinek was named the state's 2006 Gatorade player of the year after finishing the season with 2,081 yards rushing and a career total of 7,589 yards for the Chiefs. He became the first player in New Jersey to gain more than 7,000 yards, and at the time of graduation was ranked 38th on the all-time high school football rushing list.

Martinek was seventh in the state in scoring as a senior, with 160 points, and had the second-best single-game rushing total in New Jersey as a senior with 396 yards on 31 carries and four touchdowns vs. Jefferson Township High School. He garnered First Team All-State honors by the Associated Press and The Star-Ledger. He was invited to play in the NY/NJ High School All-Star Classic. On defense at linebacker, he recorded 54 tackles, four sacks, three interceptions and nine pass breakups. On special teams, he was 31-of-34 on field goal attempts (and 6-for-6 on attempts of 50 yards or longer) and punted 16 times with a net average of 46.6 yards.

Martinek appeared in the January 11, 2007 edition of Sports Illustrated in the “Faces in the Crowd” section, highlighting his New Jersey state rushing record and special teams statistics.

Martinek was also a standout track performer who won the state title in the javelin in 2007.

Martinek was a four-year starter at Hopatcong under head coach Paul Reduzzi, who said on Martinek: “Joe is a tremendous individual and tremendous athlete. With the success we had on the field the last four years was a result of Joe helping his teammates and making them better on and off the field.”

== Rutgers ==
While in high school, Martinek received an offer from Rutgers.

Martinek was redshirted his freshman season in 2007. During that first season, he did not see game action but helped prepare the team as a member of the scout team. He competed as both a running back and a safety during practice drills.

After his redshirt year, Martinek had a strong freshman season in 2008 with 404 yards rushing and four touchdowns. He averaged 5.3 yards per carry and was also a standout on special teams. He made his collegiate debut in season opener against Fresno State (9/1) and caught one pass for seven yards in the second half against the Bulldogs. He recorded his first career carry in the first quarter at Navy (9/20) and one play later scored a five-yard touchdown on his second career rush. He finished the game with 61 yards rushing on eight attempts, including a 29-yard run in the second quarter. Against UConn, Martinek delivered a big tackle on the one-yard line on a second-half kickoff against the Huskies. Against Syracuse (11/8), he took the ball from the direct snap and rushed a career-long 45 yards for his second career touchdown. Against USF on 11/15, Martinek posted career-highs in rushes (21), rushing yards (98) and rushing touchdowns (2) at USF. Martinek had 53 yards on nine carries against Army (11/22). He made his first career start in the regular-season finale against Louisville(12/4) and rushed 18 times for 57 yards, including a 22-yarder. He carried nine times for 58 yards, including a 26-yard rush, all in the second half of the PapaJohns.com Bowl against NC State (12/29) in support of Rutgers come-from-behind bowl victory.

== New York Giants ==
Martinek signed with the New York Giants as an undrafted free agent on April 28, 2012, and was waived on August 27, 2012 as NFL teams trimmed their rosters to 75. He was re-signed to their Practice Squad on October 10, 2012.

== Parma Panthers ==
In May 2015, Martinek signed and played for the Parma Panthers of the Italian Football League.

Martinek finished the season for the Panthers playing in 6 games, rushing for 567 yards on 99 carries and 8 TD's. He also caught 5 passes for 68 yards and 2 TD's. The Panthers finished 10-3 and reaching the championship game before losing to the Seamen Milano. Martinek finished the game with 34 yards rushing on 8 carries and had two receptions for 17 yards and a score.

== Beyond football ==
Martinek is formerly a Recruitment Advisor for Medix in Parsippany, NJ. He has worked for Miller Launch as a captain in Staten Island New York.
