= Kittatinny Regional High School =

High school in Sussex County, New Jersey, US

Address
- 77 Halsey Road Newton, Sussex County, New Jersey, 07860; United States
- Coordinates: 41.105117°N 74.764953°W

District information
- Grades: 7-12
- Superintendent: Craig Hutcheson
- Business administrator: Rianna Ketch
- Schools: 1

Students and staff
- Enrollment: 736 (as of 2024–25)
- Faculty: 71.5 FTEs
- Student–teacher ratio: 10.3:1

Other information
- District Factor Group: FG
- Website: www.krhs.net
Ind.	Per pupil	District spending	Rank (*)	7-12 average	%± vs. average
1A	Total Spending	$20,920	27	$18,891	10.7%
1	Budgetary Cost	16,096	23	14,586	10.4%
2	Classroom Instruction	9,840	38	8,339	18.0%
6	Support Services	1,908	12	2,114	−9.7%
8	Administrative Cost	1,721	28	1,561	10.2%
10	Operations & Maintenance	1,646	11	1,798	−8.5%
13	Extracurricular Activities	895	28	673	33.0%
16	Median Teacher Salary	79,000	39	65,769
Data from NJDoE 2014 Taxpayers' Guide to Education Spending. *Of 7-12 districts with any number of students. Lowest spending=1; Highest=47

Kittatinny Regional High School
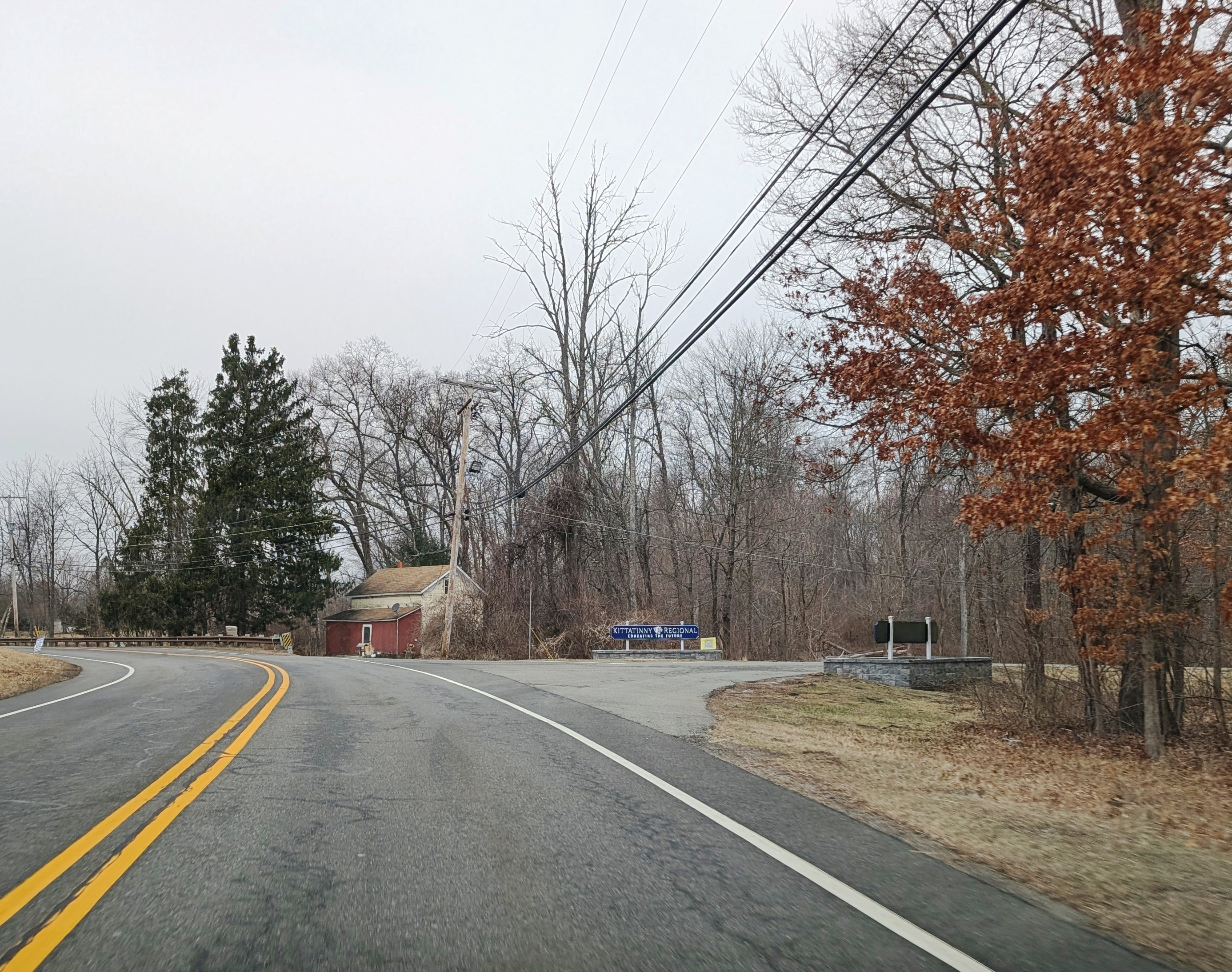
- Entrance to the school along CR 626

Information
- Type: Public high school
- Established: 1975
- NCES School ID: 340806005372
- Principal: Brian Bosworth
- Faculty: 71.5 FTEs
- Grades: 7-12
- Enrollment: 733 (as of 2024–25)
- Student to teacher ratio: 10.3:1
- Colors: Royal blue and silver
- Athletics conference: Northwest Jersey Athletic Conference (general); North Jersey Super Football Conference (football)
- Team name: Cougars
- Rival: Newton High School
- Yearbook: Puma

The Kittatinny Regional High School is a six-year comprehensive regional public high school and school district in Sussex County, in the U.S. state of New Jersey, serving students in seventh through twelfth grades from five municipalities in the northwest area of the county, which are the townships of Fredon, Hampton, Sandyston, Stillwater and Walpack. It is the only school in the Kittatinny Regional High School District. The high school is located on a 96-acre (39 ha) campus in Hampton Township, about seven minutes outside of the county seat of Newton.

As of the 2024–25 school year, the school had an enrollment of 733 students and 71.5 classroom teachers (on an FTE basis), for a student–teacher ratio of 10.3:1. There were 82 students (11.2% of enrollment) eligible for free lunch and 31 (4.2% of students) eligible for reduced-cost lunch.

The district participates in the Interdistrict Public School Choice Program, which allows non-resident students to attend school in the district at no cost to their parents, with tuition covered by the resident district. Available slots are announced annually by grade.

== History ==
By a 60%-40% margin, voters approved a February 1973 referendum that allocated $5.7 million (equivalent to $41.3 million in 2025) towards the cost of construction of the new high school facility.

In August 1974, the Newton Public School District was notified that students from the five constituent districts who had attended Newton High School as part of sending/receiving relationships would be leaving the high school. The Kittatinny regional district opened its high school to students in September 1975. Enrollment in the Newton district dropped by 400 following the departure of the districts sending to Kittatinny.

The district had been classified by the New Jersey Department of Education as being in District Factor Group "FG", the fourth-highest of eight groupings. District Factor Groups organize districts statewide to allow comparison by common socioeconomic characteristics of the local districts. From lowest socioeconomic status to highest, the categories are A, B, CD, DE, FG, GH, I and J.

== Awards, recognition and rankings ==
During the 1997–98 school year, Kittatinny Regional High School was awarded the Blue Ribbon School Award of Excellence by the United States Department of Education, the highest award an American school can receive.

Kittatinny Regional High School has been recognized as a Star School District, and in the 2005–06 school year, was awarded the honor of Governor's School of Excellence.

The school was the 133rd-ranked public high school in New Jersey out of 339 schools statewide in New Jersey Monthly magazine's September 2014 cover story on the state's "Top Public High Schools", using a new ranking methodology. The school had been ranked 89th in the state of 328 schools in 2012, after being ranked 149th in 2010 out of 322 schools listed. The magazine ranked the school 163rd in 2008 out of 316 schools. The school was ranked 149th in the magazine's September 2006 issue, which surveyed 316 schools across the state. Schooldigger.com ranked the school 155th out of 381 public high schools statewide in its 2011 rankings (an increase of 8 positions from the 2010 ranking) which were based on the combined percentage of students classified as proficient or above proficient on the mathematics (82.0%) and language arts literacy (94.6%) components of the High School Proficiency Assessment (HSPA).

In the 2013–14 school year, Kittatinny Regional High School ranked fifth in SAT scores out of nine other public high schools in Sussex County.

== Extracurricular activities ==
=== Athletics ===
The Kittatinny Regional High School Cougars sports teams compete in the Northwest Jersey Athletic Conference, which is comprised of public and private high schools in Morris, Sussex and Warren counties, and was established following a reorganization of sports leagues in Northern New Jersey by the New Jersey State Interscholastic Athletic Association (NJSIAA). Prior to the 2010 realignment, the school participated in the Sussex County Interscholastic League until the SCIL was dissolved in 2009. With 505 students in grades 10–12, the school was classified by the NJSIAA for the 2019–20 school year as Group II for most athletic competition purposes, which included schools with an enrollment of 486 to 758 students in that grade range. The football team competes in the American White division of the North Jersey Super Football Conference, which includes 112 schools competing in 20 divisions, making it the nation's biggest football-only high school sports league. The school was classified by the NJSIAA as Group I North for football for 2024–2026, which included schools with 254 to 474 students.

The field hockey team won the North I Group I state sectional title in 1978 and the North I Group II title in 1979, 1994 and 1995.

The girls' cross country team won the Group II state championship in 1986, 1988 and 1989.

The wrestling team won the North I Group II state sectional title in 1991, 1993–1998, 2000-2007 and the North Jersey Group I title in 2008 and 2011–2014, 2016, 2017, 2019 and 2022–2024; the team won the Group II state championship in 1996, 2001-2006 and the Group I title in 2008. The program's eight group titles are tied for sixth-most, while the streak of seven titles won from 2001 to 2006 is tied for third-longest. The wrestling team reached the finals of the 2006 NJSIAA North I Group II tourney defeating Raritan High School 50–18 to win the championship. In the 2006 Group II Championship, the team made it to the finals, edging Delaware Valley Regional High School 30–29 to win the state title. The 2007 team won the North I, Group II state sectional championship with a 43–24 win against Lenape Valley Regional High School.

The football team won the North I Group II state sectional championship in 2018. In 2006, the Kittatinny Regional High School football team reached the first round of the regional playoffs against Pascack Valley High School, ending the season with a 6–3 record. In 2007, the Kittatinny Cougars received the title of top in the SCIL, but were once again defeated by Pascack Valley High School in the second round of the North I, Group II state sectional championship tournament. They finished off the season with 10 wins and 1 loss, marking the best season in school history. Kittatinny had previously never ranked in the top ten in the state rankings, a distinction that the 2007 team held for over 5 weeks. The 2007 season also marked a record high in the number of individual awards The 2018 team won the North I Group II state sectional title in 2018 with a 28–19 win against Newton High School in the finals of the tournament.

== Drama ==
Drama productions at Kittatinny have focused on productions of modern Broadway theatre, endeavors which include being home to the first showing of The Who's Tommy and now Mary Poppins in Sussex County.

== Administration ==
Core members of the district / school administration are:

- Craig Hutcheson, superintendent
- Rianna Ketch, business administrator and board secretary
- Brian Bosworth, principal

== Board of education ==
The district's board of education, comprised of nine members, sets policy and oversees the fiscal and educational operation of the district through its administration. As a Type II school district, the board's trustees are elected directly by voters to serve three-year terms of office on a staggered basis, with three seats up for election each year held (since 2012) as part of the November general election. The board appoints a superintendent to oversee the district's day-to-day operations and a business administrator to supervise the business functions of the district. Seats on the board of education are allocated based on the basis of the population of the constituent municipalities, with three members each allocated to both Hampton Township and Stillwater Township, two to Fredon Township and one to Sandyston Township.

== Notable alumni ==
- Matt Valenti (born 1984), two-time NCAA Division I national champion wrestler at the University of Pennsylvania
- Jenny Owen Youngs (born 1981), singer-songwriter
