= Wallkill Valley Regional High School =

High school in Sussex County, New Jersey, US

Address
- 10 Grumm Road Hardyston Township, Sussex County, New Jersey, 07419; United States
- Coordinates: 41.159225°N 74.592789°W

District information
- Grades: 9-12
- Superintendent: David Carr
- Business administrator: Joseph P. Hurley Jr.
- Schools: 1

Students and staff
- Enrollment: 591 (as of 2024–25)
- Faculty: 49.4 FTEs
- Student–teacher ratio: 12.0:1

Other information
- District Factor Group: DE
- Website: wallkillvrhs.org
Ind.	Per pupil	District spending	Rank (*)	9-12 average	%± vs. average
1A	Total Spending	$23,359	38	$18,891	23.7%
1	Budgetary Cost	16,380	27	15,592	5.1%
2	Classroom Instruction	9,293	25	8,807	5.5%
6	Support Services	2,121	18	2,294	−7.5%
8	Administrative Cost	1,874	40	1,592	17.7%
10	Operations & Maintenance	2,225	36	1,954	13.9%
13	Extracurricular Activities	868	24	873	−0.6%
16	Median Teacher Salary	86,008	46	71,726
Data from NJDoE 2014 Taxpayers' Guide to Education Spending. *Of 9-12 districts with any number of students. Lowest spending=1; Highest=47

Wallkill Valley Regional High School

Information
- Type: Public high school
- Established: 1982
- NCES School ID: 341687005949
- Principal: David Carr
- Faculty: 49.4 FTEs
- Grades: 9-12
- Enrollment: 581 (as of 2024–25)
- Student to teacher ratio: 11.8:1
- Colors: Black silver and white
- Athletics conference: Northwest Jersey Athletic Conference (general); North Jersey Super Football Conference (football)
- Team name: Rangers
- Yearbook: Horizons

Wallkill Valley Regional High School is a four-year public high school and regional school district serving students in ninth through twelfth grades from four municipalities in Sussex County, in the U.S. state of New Jersey. The school is located in Hardyston Township, approximately 40 miles (64 km) northwest of New York City. The school is the lone facility of the Wallkill Valley Regional High School District.

The district is comprised of four constituent municipalities: Franklin, Hamburg, Hardyston Township and Ogdensburg. Each of these communities supports its own independent K-8 elementary school district. There are 14,000 residents in the constituent districts, which cover an area of 42.9 square miles (111 km^{2}).

As of the 2024–25 school year, the school had an enrollment of 581 students and 49.4 classroom teachers (on an FTE basis), for a student–teacher ratio of 11.8:1. There were 144 students (24.8% of enrollment) eligible for free lunch and 21 (3.6% of students) eligible for reduced-cost lunch.

The school has four assistant principals and 70 certified full and part-time faculty members, of whom 64% hold a master's degree.

== History ==
In the face of "badly overcrowded conditions" at Franklin High School, which served students from all four constituent municipalities, voters approved by a 4-1 margin a referendum in November 1972 for the creation of Wallkill Valley Regional High School.

In December 1974, voters in the four constituent municipalities voted against a referendum that would have spent $10 million (equivalent to $65.3 million in 2025) on the construction of a new building, as well as other questions that covered additions for a planetarium and a swimming pool.

For the 1978-79 school year, Ogdensburg withdrew from Franklin High School and began sending students to Sparta High School.

The district sought bids in 1979 for a building costing $8.3 million (equivalent to $36.8 million in 2025), using funds from a referendum approved the previous year.

The school building opened in September 1982 with an enrollment of 500 students.

The district had been classified by the New Jersey Department of Education as being in District Factor Group "DE", the fifth-highest of eight groupings. District Factor Groups organize districts statewide to allow comparison by common socioeconomic characteristics of the local districts. From lowest socioeconomic status to highest, the categories are A, B, CD, DE, FG, GH, I and J.

In 2024, the district began a regionalization process with its constituent municipalities to consider the formation of a common K–12 district.

== Course offerings ==
Wallkill's program of studies features a wide range of courses taught on five levels of instruction. The levels are honors or advanced placement, academic, general, basic, and resource center. Areas of instruction include Art, Business, English, Foreign Language, Home Economics, Industrial Arts, Mathematics, Music, Computer Science, Physical Education, Science, and Social Studies. Advanced Placement (AP) courses are offered in AP English Language and Composition, AP English Literature and Composition, AP United States History, AP Biology, AP Chemistry, AP Art History, AP Computer Science, and AP Calculus. Students may also elect to take AP Tests even if the class is not offered. Several courses are available for college credit; they are based on the curriculum at Sussex County Community College.

== Awards, recognition and rankings ==
The school was the 184th-ranked public high school in New Jersey out of 339 schools statewide in New Jersey Monthly magazine's September 2014 cover story on the state's "Top Public High Schools", using a new ranking methodology. The school had been ranked 125th in the state of 328 schools in 2012, after being ranked 195th in 2010 out of 322 schools listed. The magazine ranked the school 189th in 2008 out of 316 schools. The school was ranked 190th in the magazine's September 2006 issue, which surveyed 316 schools across the state.

== Extracurricular activities ==
There are 21 different athletic activities available to the students at Wallkill Valley. Many of these activities have three levels of participation including freshmen, junior-varsity and varsity. Several non-athletic activities are also available and leadership positions are sometimes available in each area. Some examples include Mock trial, Student Council, Math League, Environmental Club and Future Business Leaders of America (FBLA).

== Athletics ==
The Wallkill Valley Regional High School Rangers participate in the Northwest Jersey Athletic Conference, which is comprised of public and private high schools in Morris, Sussex and Warren counties and was established following a reorganization of sports leagues in Northern New Jersey by the New Jersey State Interscholastic Athletic Association (NJSIAA). The school had participated in the Sussex County Interscholastic League until the SCIL was dissolved in 2009. With 440 students in grades 10-12, the school was classified by the NJSIAA for the 2019–20 school year as Group I for most athletic competition purposes, which included schools with an enrollment of 75 to 476 students in that grade range. The football team competes in the National Blue division of the North Jersey Super Football Conference, which includes 112 schools competing in 20 divisions, making it the nation's biggest football-only high school sports league. The school was classified by the NJSIAA as Group I North for football for 2024–2026, which included schools with 254 to 474 students. The athletic director is Daryl Jones.

The school participates in joint ice hockey, boys lacrosse and boys / girls swimming teams with High Point Regional High School as the host school / lead agency. Wallkill Valley also participates in a co-op wrestling team, with Vernon Township High School as the host school. These co-op programs operate under agreements scheduled to expire at the end of the 2023–24 school year.

Sports offered by the school include:

- Football (Boys)
- Soccer (Boys & Girls)
- Cross Country (Co-ed)
- Field Hockey (Girls)
- Cheerleading (Year-round)
- Tennis (Boys & Girls)
- Basketball (Boys & Girls)
- Wrestling (Boys)
- Baseball (Boys)
- Softball (Girls)
- Golf (Co-ed)
- Bowling (Co-ed)
- Swimming (Co-ed)
- Ski Team (Co-ed)
- Indoor Track (Co-ed)
- Outdoor Track (Co-ed)

The field hockey team won the North I Group I state sectional championship in 1982-1984 and 2017, and won the North I, Group II title in 1988, 1991, 1992 and 2006.

The boys' wrestling team won the North I, Group II state sectional championship in 1987–1989.

The 1994 football team finished the season with a 9-1-1 record after winning the North I Group II state sectional title with a 22–0 win against Lenape Valley Regional High School in the championship game.

In each of the three years from 2012 to 2014, Craig Corti won the individual Group II cross-country running championship, making him the eighth runner in state history to earn three individual state titles.

== Administration ==
Core members of the school's / district's administration are:

- David Carr, superintendent and principal

== Board of education ==
The district's board of education, comprised of nine members, sets policy and oversees the fiscal and educational operation of the district through its administration. As a Type II school district, the board's trustees are elected directly by voters to serve three-year terms of office on a staggered basis, with three seats up for election each year held (since 2012) as part of the November general election. The board appoints a superintendent to oversee the district's day-to-day operations and a business administrator to supervise the business functions of the district. Seats are allocated based on the populations of the constituent municipalities, with four seats assigned to Hardyston Township, two to Franklin, two to Hamburg and one to Ogdensburg.
