= North Jersey Super Football Conference =

American high school football league in New Jersey

The Super Football Conference is a football-only athletic league of high schools in New Jersey. The 111-team (representing 112 schools with the Cliffside Park / Ridgefield co-op) league was formed in 2016.

== History ==
The SFC consists of nearly all of the football playing member schools of four conferences that were formed after a significant realignment in New Jersey high school athletics saw the creation of several new leagues.

The conferences that came together to form this league were:

- The Big North Conference, which consists of many larger public and parochial schools in Bergen and Passaic Counties.
- The Hudson County Interscholastic League, which consists of most of the public and parochial schools in Hudson County, with the exceptions of Secaucus High School, Weehawken High School, and Harrison High School (which all belong to the North Jersey Interscholastic Conference).
- The Super Essex Conference, which consists entirely of schools in Essex County.
- The Northwest Jersey Athletic Conference, which consists of schools located in Morris, Sussex, and Warren Counties.

The league, which included more than one hundred schools, is the largest such league in the United States.

In 2020, the SFC announced the formation of what it referred to as the Ivy Divisions. Two sets of teams play exclusively against each other in the Ivy Red and White divisions, and both are composed of teams that have consistently had trouble either fielding a team or staying competitive. The teams are grouped together largely regardless of size, and each of the initial schools that compete in the divisions are required to commit to them for two years. Ivy Division schools are precluded from state playoff consideration.

The Ivy Divisions expanded from 12 to 18 teams for the 2026 season, adding the Ivy Gold division, and expanding the Ivy Playoffs from four to six teams.

== Divisions ==
There are a total of 22 divisions in the SFC, and each division contains between four and six teams. Divisions are aligned every two years, based on team performance, school size, and location.

United Red

- Bergen Catholic High School
- Don Bosco Preparatory High School
- Paramus Catholic High School
- Saint Joseph Regional High School
- St. Peter's Preparatory School

United White

- Delbarton School
- DePaul Catholic High School
- Pope John XXIII Regional High School
- Seton Hall Preparatory School

Freedom Red

- Bayonne High School
- Columbia High School
- Irvington High School
- Passaic County Technical Institute
- Union City High School

Freedom White

- Barringer High School
- Bloomfield High School
- East Orange Campus High School
- Livingston High School
- Montclair High School
- West Orange High School

Freedom Blue

- Clifton High School
- Eastside High School (Paterson)
- Hackensack High School
- Passaic High School
- Ridgewood High School

Liberty Red

- Northern Highlands Regional High School
- Northern Valley Regional High School at Old Tappan
- Ramapo High School
- Wayne Hills High School
- Wayne Valley High School

Liberty White

- Chatham High School
- Morris Knolls High School
- Morristown High School
- Mount Olive High School
- West Morris Central High School

Liberty Blue

- West Morris Mendham High School
- Morris Hills High School
- Randolph High School
- Roxbury High School
- Warren Hills Regional High School

Liberty Gold

- Montville Township High School
- Parsippany Hills High School
- Passaic Valley Regional High School
- Sparta High School
- West Milford High School

Patriot Red

- Orange High School
- Central High School (Newark)
- Nutley High School
- Weequahic High School
- West Essex High School

Patriot White

- Hudson Catholic Regional High School
- Lincoln High School
- Malcolm X Shabazz High School
- Henry Snyder High School
- West Side High School (Newark)

Patriot Blue

- Fair Lawn High School
- Paramus High School
- Pascack Valley High School
- River Dell High School
- Teaneck High School

American Red

- Dumont High School
- Lakeland Regional High School
- Mahwah High School
- Ramsey High School
- Westwood Regional High School

American White

- James Caldwell High School
- Hanover Park High School
- Madison High School
- Mountain Lakes High School
- Pequannock Township High School

American Blue

- Hackettstown High School
- High Point Regional High School
- Morris Catholic High School
- Jefferson Township High School
- Newton High School
- Vernon Township High School

National Red

- Cedar Grove High School
- Glen Ridge High School
- Hoboken High School
- Newark Collegiate Academy
- Verona High School

National White

- Boonton High School
- Hopatcong High School
- Indian Hills High School
- Kinnelon High School
- Parsippany High School
- Whippany Park High School

National Blue

- Kittatinny Regional High School
- Lenape Valley Regional High School
- North Warren Regional High School
- Sussex County Technical School
- Wallkill Valley Regional High School

Independent

- Immaculata High School

Ivy Red

- Cliffside Park High School (co-op with Ridgefield Memorial High School)
- William L. Dickinson High School
- James J. Ferris High School
- Kearny High School
- Memorial High School (West New York)
- North Bergen High School

Ivy White

- Northern Valley Regional High School at Demarest
- Dwight Morrow High School
- Fort Lee High School
- Pascack Hills High School
- Ridgefield Park High School
- Tenafly High School

Ivy Gold

- Belleville High School
- Bergenfield High School
- Bergen County Technical Schools
- Dover High School
- John F. Kennedy High School (Paterson)
- Millburn High School
