= Sussex County Vocational School District =

School district in Sussex County, New Jersey, US

Sussex County Technical School

Address
- 105 North Church Road Sparta, Sussex County, New Jersey, 07871; United States
- Coordinates: 41.096657°N 74.653466°W

District information
- Grades: 9-12 (and continuing education)
- Superintendent: Monica Rowland (interim)
- Business administrator: Jenny Deuel
- Schools: 1

Students and staff
- Enrollment: 663 (as of 2024–25)
- Faculty: 52.5 FTEs
- Student–teacher ratio: 12.6:1

Other information
- Website: www.sussextech.org
Ind.	Per pupil	District spending	Rank (*)	Vocational average	%± vs. average
1A	Total Spending	$23,736	13	$18,891	25.6%
1	Budgetary Cost	16,014	9	17,296	−7.4%
2	Classroom Instruction	8,109	8	9,045	−10.3%
6	Support Services	2,629	17	2,269	15.9%
8	Administrative Cost	1,763	5	2,353	−25.1%
10	Operations & Maintenance	2,506	8	3,014	−16.9%
13	Extracurricular Activities	942	19	464	103.0%
16	Median Teacher Salary	58,461	4	65,035
Data from NJDoE 2014 Taxpayers' Guide to Education Spending. *Of Vocational districts with any number of students. Lowest spending=1; Highest=21

The Sussex County Technical School District is a county-wide vocational technical public school district located in Sparta Township, serving students in ninth through twelfth grades and adult students from Sussex County, in the U.S. state of New Jersey.

As of the 2024–25 school year, the district, comprised of one school, had an enrollment of 663 students and 52.5 classroom teachers (on an FTE basis), for a student–teacher ratio of 12.6:1.

== School ==
The district's lone facility is Sussex County Technical School (originally named "Sussex County Vocational-Technical School" when established in 1969), which offers an extensive range of professional and trade instruction to county students. The local district is responsible for paying the tuition for students attending the school as well as providing transportation.

- Monica Rowland, principal

== Administration ==
Core members of the district's administration are:

- Monica Rowland, interim superintendent
- Jenny Deuel, business administrator and board secretary

== Board of education ==
The district's board of education, comprised of five members, sets policy and oversees the fiscal and educational operations of the district through its administration. As a Type I school district, four of the board's trustees are appointed by the Sussex County Board of County Commissioners to serve three-year terms of office on a staggered basis, with either one or two seats up for appointment each year. The Executive County Superintendent serves on the board as an ex officio member. The board appoints a superintendent to oversee the district's day-to-day operations and a business administrator to supervise the business functions of the district.
