= Roger Reina =

American wrestling coach

Roger Reina is the current University of Pennsylvania wrestling coach (1986–2005). He left coaching in 2005 after 19 seasons on the mat where he had a career record of 205-106-6, making him the most successful coach in the 101-year history of the program. He is credited with coaching 63 NCAA Qualifiers, 31 EIWA Champions, 17 All-Americans, 4 consecutive EIWA titles, three NCAA finalists, an NCAA Champion and an Olympic Gold Medalist. Roger himself graduated from UPenn in 1984 where he was a four year starter on the team.

Reina is now the Director of Business Development for Sports at TicketLeap, an online ticketing provider located in Philadelphia.

== Accomplishments ==
- Chairman of the Ivy League Wrestling Coaches Association
- President of the EIWA Coaches Association
- President of the National Wrestling Coaches Association (NWCA)
- Four-time NWCA National Coach of the Year nominee (1996-00)
- Three-time EIWA Coach of the Year.
