= Northwest Jersey Athletic Conference =

Sports league in New Jersey

The Northwest Jersey Athletic Conference (NJAC) is a sports league that includes 39 public and private high schools from Morris County, Sussex County and Warren County, New Jersey, that operates under the auspices of the New Jersey State Interscholastic Athletic Association.

The conference was formed in 2009 by the NJSIAA as part of a major statewide reorganization of athletic leagues and included schools that had previously been members of the Sussex County Interscholastic League as well as Morris County schools that had been part of the Colonial Hills Conference, Iron Hills Conference, and the Northern Hills Conference. Two northern Warren County schools opted to leave the Skyland Conference to join the NJAC; Hackettstown joined when the conference formed, while North Warren officially became a member in the fall of 2012.

The NJAC sponsors competition in most high school sports, but not in football. The conference originally had football divisions, but merged with three other leagues in 2016 to form the North Jersey Super Football Conference (now simply known as the Super Football Conference).

Members of the Northwest Jersey Athletic Conference include:

- Academy of Saint Elizabeth - Convent Station
- Boonton High School - Boonton
- Chatham High School - Chatham
- Delbarton School – Morristown
- Dover High School - Dover
- Hackettstown High School - Hackettstown
- Hanover Park High School - East Hanover
- High Point Regional High School - Sussex
- Hopatcong High School - Hopatcong
- Jefferson Township High School - Oak Ridge
- Kinnelon High School - Kinnelon
- Kittatinny Regional High School - Newton
- Lenape Valley Regional High School - Stanhope
- Madison High School - Madison
- Montville Township High School - Montville
- Morris Catholic High School – Denville
- Morris County School of Technology - Denville
- Morris Hills High School - Rockaway
- Morris Knolls High School – Rockaway
- Morristown High School – Morristown
- Morristown-Beard School - Morristown
- Mount Olive High School - Flanders
- Mountain Lakes High School - Mountain Lakes
- Newton High School - Newton
- North Warren Regional High School - Blairstown
- Parsippany High School - Parsippany
- Parsippany Hills High School - Parsippany
- Pequannock Township High School - Pequannock
- Pope John XXIII Regional High School - Sparta
- Randolph High School - Randolph
- Roxbury High School - Succasunna
- Sparta High School - Sparta
- Sussex County Technical High School - Sparta
- Vernon Township High School - Vernon
- Villa Walsh Academy - Morristown
- Wallkill Valley Regional High School – Hamburg
- West Morris Central High School - Chester
- West Morris Mendham High School – Mendham
- Whippany Park High School – Whippany

Former members of the Northwest Jersey Athletic Conference:

- Butler High School - Butler (left for NJIC after 2017-18 season)
