= Dave Yovanovits =

American football player (born 1981)

No. 64, 68
- Position: Guard

Personal information
- Born: March 6, 1981 (age 45); Stanhope, New Jersey, U.S.
- Listed height: 6 ft 3 in (1.91 m)
- Listed weight: 300 lb (136 kg)

Career information
- High school: Hopatcong (Hopatcong, New Jersey)
- College: Temple
- NFL draft: 2003: 7th round, 237th overall pick

Career history
- New York Jets (2003–2004); Cleveland Browns (2005); Detroit Lions (2006)*; New Orleans Saints (2007)
- * Offseason or practice squad member only

Career NFL statistics
- Games: 6
- Games started: 1
- Stats at Pro Football Reference

Dave Yovanovits (born March 6, 1981) is an American former professional football guard in the National Football League (NFL). He played college football for the Temple Owls, playing in every snap of 40 of 45 games. He was selected in the 2003 NFL draft by the New York Jets, whom he played for in 2003 and 2004. He was released by the Jets in order to reduce salary cap space when the team signed Ty Law in 2005. Yovanovits made his first career start in the Browns' 20–16 win over the Baltimore Ravens in their 2005 season finale. After briefly joining the Detroit Lions in December 2006, Yovanovits signed with the New Orleans Saints on February 16, 2007.

Yovanovits played high school football for Hopatcong High School in Hopatcong, New Jersey. He has been a resident of Stanhope, New Jersey.
