= Sussex County Technical School =

High school in Sussex County, New Jersey, US

Location
- 105 North Church Road; Sparta, Sussex County, New Jersey 07871; United States; 41.096887°N 74.653019°W

Information
- Type: Public high school
- Motto: "The Sussex County Technical School, a school of choice, in partnership with family, community, business, industry and institutions of higher learning, empowers secondary and adult students to become self-directed learners and active participants in their community by providing a competitive advantage to pursue ANY career opportunity."
- Established: 1969
- School district: Sussex County Vocational School District
- NCES School ID: 341593005416
- Principal: Monica Rowland
- Faculty: 58.0 FTEs
- Grades: 9–12
- Enrollment: 689 (as of 2023–24)
- Student to teacher ratio: 11.9:1
- Colors: Green and gold
- Athletics conference: Northwest Jersey Athletic Conference (general); North Jersey Super Football Conference (football)
- Team name: Mustangs
- Publication: Quill (literary magazine)
- Newspaper: Mustang Press
- Website: www.sussextech.org

Sussex County Technical School was originally established with the official name of “Sussex County Vocational-Technical School” in 1969, the name was changed in the year 2000. The school is a county-wide technical public high school located in Sparta Township in Sussex County, in the U.S. state of New Jersey, serving students in ninth through twelfth grades as part of the Sussex County Vocational School District. It is the home of the McNeice Auditorium and the Fighting Mustangs. The school's official colors are hunter green and gold. Monica Rowland is the Interim Superintendent and Principal. There are 19 different trades to choose from; Building Trades, Business Management and Administration, Carpentry, Cinematography and Film/Video Production, Clerical Skills, Commercial Art, Commercial Baking, Computer Aided Drafting and Design, Cosmetology, Culinary Arts, Electrical, Electronics Technology, Engineering, Graphic Design (Graphic Communications), Heating, Ventilation and Air Conditioning (HVAC), Horticulture/Landscape Design Technology, Transportation Technology (Auto/Diesel), Vehicle Maintenance Technology and Welding.

As of the 2023–24 school year, the school had an enrollment of 689 students and 58.0 classroom teachers (on an FTE basis), for a student–teacher ratio of 11.9:1. There were 63 students (9.1% of enrollment) eligible for free lunch and 24 (3.5% of students) eligible for reduced-cost lunch.

The Technical School is the home of all nine of the Umptysquatch human-powered submarines and the teams of engineering students who built them.

== Athletics ==
The Sussex County Technical School Mustangs compete in the Northwest Jersey Athletic Conference, which is comprised of public and private high schools in Morris, Sussex and Warren counties, and was established following a reorganization of sports leagues in Northern New Jersey by the New Jersey State Interscholastic Athletic Association (NJSIAA). Until the NJSIAA's 2009 realignment, the school had participated in the Sussex County Interscholastic League, which included public and private high schools located in Sussex County and northern Morris County. With 624 students in grades 10-12, the school was classified by the NJSIAA for the 2019–20 school year as Group II for most athletic competition purposes, which included schools with an enrollment of 486 to 758 students in that grade range. The football team competes in the National Blue division of the North Jersey Super Football Conference, which includes 112 schools competing in 20 divisions, making it the nation's biggest football-only high school sports league. The school was classified by the NJSIAA as Group II North for football for 2024–2026, which included schools with 484 to 683 students.

Interscholastic sports offered at the school include:

- Fall: Football, Boys' Soccer, Girls' Soccer, Cross-Country (Boys' & Girls'), Cheerleading, and Girls' Tennis.
- Winter: Boys' Basketball, Girls' Basketball, Winter Track (Boys' and Girls') Cheerleading, Bowling (Boys' & Girls'), and Snowboard & Ski Club.
- Spring: Track and Field (Boys' & Girls'), Baseball, and Softball

The boys bowling team won the Group II state championship in 2016, 2017 and 2018. The program's three state titles are tied for eight-most in the state. The team won the Group II state title for the third consecutive year with 3,077 pins, ahead of St. Joseph High School in second place by 198 pins.

== Awards ==
- 2009 Champions of the Grill

The team includes students from the Sussex Tech culinary department competed in the amateur division of Champions of the Grill. They won the overall title for their entries in the Grilled Chicken and Smoked Beef categories. Additionally, they placed 1st in the Pork Rib Category and finished their winning streak by taking home the trophy for overall best in the Amateur Division.

- Skills USA

In the 2009 National Competition, Josh Stephens earned the gold medal in Power Equipment Technology. He went on to earn the Gold Medal again in 2010. Additionally, at the 2009 New Jersey state championships, gold medals were earned in six competitions, silver in eight, and bronze in four. In the states competition in May, two students won gold medals in "Tech Prep Showcase Science Math and Research"

- International Submarine Race
  - Umptysquatch IV: Best Design Outline, Best Spirit of the Races
  - Umptysquatch 3.2: 1st Place, Innovation, 3rd Place, Best Overall Performance
  - Umptysquatch 1: Best Design Outline and Report Award, 3rd place, Fastest Two-person, propeller, academic category

== Graduation rate ==
According to the state's NCLB Report, the graduation rate for Sussex County Technical School for the class of 2008 was 96.2%. This rate exceeds the State high school graduation rate of approximately 93.1%.

In the 2013–14 school year, Sussex County Technical School ranked ninth in Sussex County out of nine other public high schools in SAT scores.

== Student body ==
In the 2013-2014 school year there were 75 students from Montague Township.
