= Pope John XXIII Regional High School =

High school in Sussex County, New Jersey, US

Location
- 28 Andover Road; Sparta, (Sussex County), New Jersey 07871; United States; 41°1′55″N 74°40′4″W

Information
- Type: Private, Coeducational
- Motto: Esse Honorem Patri Nostro
- Religious affiliation: Roman Catholic
- Established: 1956
- Founder: Bishop James A. McNulty
- NCES School ID: A1902841
- President: Dan O'Keefe
- Principal: Gene Emering
- Faculty: NA FTEs
- Grades: 8–12
- Enrollment: 565 (as of 2026–27)
- Student to teacher ratio: NA
- Colors: Navy Blue; White; Gold
- Athletics conference: Northwest Jersey Athletic Conference (general); North Jersey Super Football Conference (football)
- Team name: Lions
- Accreditation: Cognia
- Yearbook: Generation
- Tuition: $19,400 (2026-27; grades 9–12)
- Website: www.popejohn.org

Pope John XXIII Regional High School is a Roman Catholic high school in Sparta, in Sussex County, in the U.S. state of New Jersey. The school was founded in 1956, originally as Our Lady Of The Lake School and is part of the Roman Catholic Diocese of Paterson. The school name was changed to honor Pope John XXIII after his death in 1963. The school has been accredited by Cognia since 2010.

As of the 2026–27 school year, the school had an enrollment of 565 students.

In 2016, grades 5-7 at the Rev. George A. Brown Elementary School were moved into the newly built Pope John XXIII Middle School, which shares its campus with the high school. To do this the schools of Immaculate Conception Regional School (in Franklin), Saint Joseph's Regional School (in Newton) and Saint Michael's Regional School (in Netcong) were all closed and merged into Pope John Middle School.

== Philosophy and coursework ==
Pope John XXIII Regional High School has a Catholic philosophy in accordance with Church teaching. The school also has a college prep course of study in academic subjects. Students are required to not only take state required courses but an additional year of Math and Science. Theology coursework is required for every marking period a student is enrolled at the school. Two years of a foreign language such as Spanish and French are also required as well as a fine art course. Twenty-three Advanced Placement (AP) courses are offered. Moreover, Pope John offers 8 concurrent enrollment courses with Sussex County Community College and St. John's University An eighth grade honors program for math, history, English and science is also offered The math and science taught to the eighth grade honors students is also taught to the freshman. The school's music department was founded in the mid-1970s by John-Michael Caprio, who would go on to be director of music at New York City's St. Patrick's Cathedral in the 1990s. In addition to the eighth grade honors program for area Catholic schools, Pope John launched their own eighth grade class in the 2009–2010 academic year, but only accepted eighth grade students who were previously from public schools.

Like most Catholic schools, students are required to wear uniforms. The uniform policy is enforced to ensure students live up the proper standard expected of them by the administration and faculty. Uniforms, for example, include uniform dress shoes, ties (for boys), and dress pants and skirts, respectively, which are coordinated by class and change as a student moves to the next grade. The school also does not allow for any facial hair on boys or any "hair that reaches past the ear or below the collar;" infractions of proper uniform often result in punishment by the administration or faculty.

The school maintains a mainstream Roman Catholic theological position, with 80% of the student body being Catholic, though students from all denominations and religions are accepted.

== 2026 At a Glance ==
20 Average Class Size

120+ Courses Offered

1210 Mean SAT score

32 Varsity Sports

91% Student Involvement in sports, clubs and activities

51% Student Body enrolled in Fine Arts Courses

123 AP Scholars

$32.3M College scholarships earned by Class of 2026

5,411 Service Hours completed by students last year

== Athletics ==
The Pope John Lions compete in the Northwest Jersey Athletic Conference, which is comprised of public and private high schools in Morris, Sussex and Warren counties, and was established following a reorganization of sports leagues in Northern New Jersey by the New Jersey State Interscholastic Athletic Association (NJSIAA). Until the NJSIAA's 2009 realignment, the school had participated in the Sussex County Interscholastic League, which included public and private high schools located in Sussex County and northern Morris County. With 510 students in grades 10-12, the school was classified by the NJSIAA for the 2019–20 school year as Non-Public A for most athletic competition purposes, which included schools with an enrollment of 381 to 1,454 students in that grade range (equivalent to Group II for public schools). The football team competes in the United White division of the North Jersey Super Football Conference, which includes 112 schools competing in 20 divisions, making it the nation's biggest football-only high school sports league. The school was classified by the NJSIAA as Non-Public Group B (equivalent to Group I/II for public schools) for football for 2024–2026, which included schools with 140 to 686 students.

The 1964 baseball team won the Non-Public C state championship, defeating Saint James High School in the tournament final.

Since the playoff era started in 1974, the school's football team won 18 state championships under coach Victor Paternostro. The football team won the NJSIAA Non-Public B North state sectional title in 1975, 1979, 1981–1983, 1986–1991 and 1993, and won the Non-Public II titles in 1995-1998, 2001 and 2002. The 1975 team finished with 10–0 record for the season and extended its streak to 34 games without a loss after a 14–6 win in the championship game against St. Mary High School gave the team the Parochial B North title. The 1979 team had a 10-0-1 record after winning the Parochial B North final over Immaculate Conception High School of Montclair by a 28-0 score. A 28-0 win against St. Cecilia High School in the 1981 Parochial B North championship game gave the team a 10-1 record for the season. A 27-0 championship game win against Immaculate Conception of Montclair gave the team the 1982 Parochial A North state sectional title. The 1983 team finished the season with a record of 11-0 after winning the Parochial B North sectional title with a 40-14 win against Saint Joseph of the Palisades High School in the championship game. The 1986 team took the Parochial B North title and finished the season at 10-1 after a 35-0 win against Phillipsburg Catholic High School in the championship game. The 1987 team's 22-7 championship game win against Morris Catholic High School gave the team the Parochial B North sectional title and an 11-0 season record. A 35-0 win against Marist High School in the championship game gave the team an 11-0 record and the 1991 Parochial B North title, and making Pope John the first program in the state to win six straight state football titles. The 1993 team won the inaugural Parochial Group II title with a 14-0 win in the championship game against Marist to finish the season with a 10-1 record. The 2001 team used a strong defense to finish the season with a 9-1 record after winning the Parochial Group II state title by defeating Paterson Catholic High School by a score of 13-12 in the finals. In 2002, the football team won the Non-Public II state sectional championship with a 41-12 win against Queen of Peace High School in the tournament final. In 2009, Coach Paternostro became New Jersey's winningest high school football coach with the Lions' win over West Morris Mendham High School. Paternostro resigned from his coaching position after the 2010 season, leaving with an overall record of 373-68-5 in 43 seasons, including 20 state championships, 19 Sussex County Interscholastic League titles and two NJAC titles, and was replaced by Brian Carlson formerly from Kean University.

The wrestling team won the Non-Public Group B North state sectional championship in 1980–1983 (as co-champion in 1980), 1986, 1988, 1992, 1994 and 2018-2020. The team won the Non-Public Group B state title in 1982, 1983, 1986, 1992 and 2018.

The boys tennis team won the Non-Public Group B&C state championship in 1982, against runner-up Saint Mary's High School (South Amboy) in the final match of the tournament.

The girls' outdoor track and field team won the Non-Public Group B state championship in 1984-1990 and won the Non-Public B title in 2006, 2007 and 2012-2014. The program's 12 state titles are tied for the most in the state and the streak of seven consecutive titles from 1984 to 1990 is tied for the second-longest statewide. The 1990 team won the program's seventh straight Parochial B title, defeating Mater Dei High School by 45-32 in the finals.

The boys track team won the spring / outdoor track title as Non-Public B champion in 1990, 1991, 1993 (as co-champion) and 1994. The 1990 team won the program's first championship, defeating DePaul Catholic High School by 51-32 in the Parochial B finals.

The boys cross country team won the Non-Public B state championship in 1993, 1994 and 1995.

The girls swimming team won the Non-Public B state championship in 1995.

The field hockey team won the North I Group II state sectional championship in 1996.

The girls cross country running team won the Non-Public Group B state championship in 2001 and the Non-Public A title in 2005.

The boys track team was the indoor track Group II state championship in 2004 and the Group I title in 2007. The girls indoor track team won in Group I in 2007, and in Non-Public A in 2013 and 2014.

In 2005–06, the hockey team advanced to the state semi-finals, where they lost 3-2 to the Delbarton School. The 2003-04 team was the champions of the Northern Red division, going undefeated in conference play and winning the conference tournament. The 2002-03 team had lost the previous year in the conference championship game after winning the conference regular season title. During the 2018-19 season the team captured the Gordon National Division Title and finished ranked number 4 in the state in NJ.com boys ice hockey rankings.

In March 2008, the Pope John ski team won its first state championship.

The boys basketball team won the Non-Public Group A state championship in 2015, defeating Christian Brothers Academy in the final of the tournament. The program won the 2015 title with a 71-35 win in the playoff final against Christian Brothers Academy.

== Student organizations and clubs ==
Pope John XXIII High School has 34 clubs and 5 honors societies. The following organizations and clubs are present at Pope John XXIII Regional High School:

- Academic: Academic Team, Artificial Intelligence (AI) Club, Business Club, Chess Team, Computer Science Honor Society, Debate Club, DECA Chapter, Engineering Club, English Honor Society, First Aid Society, FTC Robotics, HOSA (Health Occupation Students of America), Investment Club/Stock Market, Mock Trial, Mu Alpha Theta (Math Honor Society), Science National Honor Society, Social Studies Honor Society, Robotics
- Fine Arts: Concert Band, Concert Choir, Drama Club, Jazz Ensemble, Mixed Choir, Pep Band, Pope John Players, Fashion Club, Photography Club, Pope John Players, Choir Club
- Language & Culture: French Club, French Honor Society, Spanish Club, Spanish Honor Society
- Leadership: National Honor Society, Language Honor Society, Pope John Leadership Council
- Spiritual & Service: Habitat for Humanity, Key Club, Catholic Athletes for Christ, FIERCE Athlete Club, Golden Years Elderly Support Club, Green Team, Holy Rosary Club, National Honor Society, Pass It Along, SEARCH

The Catholic Academy of Sussex County supports two levels of FIRST robotics: FLL for Pope John XXIII Middle School, and FTC for Pope John XXIII Regional High School. FRC used to be an offered program at the high school, but the teams have since been retired. FTC teams 247 "Reboot" and 248 "Fatal Error" have remained continuously active under a number of coaches since their establishment in 2007 under Vince Frascella. In 2011 a Zero Robotics team was also started. Pope John does not restrict the program to their own students, approximately ten to fifteen percent of the FTC and FRC team members in any given year come from other area high schools, and FLL students come from both public and private area elementary schools.

In the 2010–2011 academic year sixty-two students were involved in some level of the program.

In the 2009–2010 season the school's two FTC teams both qualified for the World Championship held in Atlanta, Georgia. FTC Team 247 won the New York City Championship as captain team, and FTC Team 248 won the New Jersey Championship as captain team. Additionally, the teams jointly came in second place at the Pennsylvania Championship.

In the 2010–2011 season the school expanded FTC to three teams. One of the three teams qualified for the World Championship held in St. Louis, Missouri (team 4391). This marked the third consecutive season in which a Pope John FTC team qualified for the World Championship.

In the 2011–2012 season the school added a Zero Robotics team and was one of only nine schools nationally to qualify as a captain team in the finals. The finals were held on board the International Space Station on small SPHERES robots which maneuver in zero gravity. Pope John and other finalist teams observed from MIT. Astronauts on board the ISS served as referees for the game. Although the tournament only officially named the top three winning teams, Pope John's scores during elimination rounds placed them at fourth position nationally.

The team also publishes a book, FTC Robotics: Tips, Tricks, Strategies, and Secrets, which guides new and veteran teams through the process of building a winning FTC program. The book is available through major online retailers. Over one thousand copies sold during the 2010–2011 season. The team has also donated hundreds of copies of the book to rookie FTC teams across the United States as an outreach effort.

A major expansion of the Robotics program took place in 2010–2011. This expansion included adding academic awards recognition to robotics team participants, creating the first Varsity Letter program for Robotics in Sussex County, New Jersey on March 31, 2011, and adding a new academic course, Honors Robotics I.

== Notable alumni ==
- Larry Arico (born 1969), former head college football coach for the Fairleigh Dickinson University–Florham Devils and William Paterson University Pioneers football programs
- Noah Brown (born 1996, class of 2014), wide receiver for the Washington Commanders
- Delicate Steve (born Steve Marion, class of 2005), recording artist signed to David Byrne's Luaka Bop Records
- Jerry Doyle (born 1956), actor and radio personality best known for his role as Michael Garibaldi on Babylon 5
- Brian Driscoll (born 1979), acting director of the Federal Bureau of Investigation (FBI)
- Katie Henry, blues rock singer, guitarist, pianist and songwriter
- Ryan Izzo (born 1995, class of 2014), American football tight end for the Seattle Seahawks of the National Football League
- Alison Littell McHose (born 1965), politician who served in the New Jersey General Assembly from 2003 to 2015, where she represented the 24th Legislative District
- Tim Sweeney (born 1980), former professional baseball player who became a sports agent and participated in The Amazing Race 23
