= Ticketleap =

Ticketleap Inc.
- Industry: Ticketing
- Founded: 2003
- Founder: Christopher Stanchak
- Headquarters: Pittsburgh, Pennsylvania, U.S.
- Area served: North America, Australia, Europe
- Key people: Tim Raybould (President & CEO), Christopher Stanchak (Chairman)
- Website: ticketleap.com

Ticketleap is an online ticket sales and event marketing company based in Pittsburgh. Founded in 2003 by Wharton graduate Christopher Stanchak, Ticketleap differentiates itself from large ticket vendors by catering its e-ticketing services to small companies and events, as well as larger events. The company started out as just Chris and his mother Connie as the first employee, but since expanded across the United States, and now to Canada, Australia, France, Germany, Ireland, Italy, Mexico, New Zealand, Spain, and the United Kingdom. Chris Stanchak, the CEO, was nominated as a finalist for the 2011 Greater Philadelphia Region Ernst & Young Entrepreneur of The Year Award in May, 2011.

== Features ==
On August 2, 2010, Ticketleap launched a new platform which is integrated into the social media sites Facebook and Twitter.

On January 10, 2011 the company announced an Android ticket scanning application, allowing event organizers to scan tickets for Ticketleap events with an Android phone and ensure that all tickets are authentic. On May 13, 2011 Ticketleap launched Ticketleap Box Office Ticket Sales letting event organizers sell tickets anywhere there is an Internet connection, such as selling tickets at the door. The product keeps online and onsite sales all in one system. On April 30, 2012 Ticketleap released a "self-service seating" feature, an industry first. The feature enables event organizers to build and control custom seating for event attendees and allows event goers to choose their own seats at a specific price point.

On June 25, 2012, Ticketleap ditched the frog, its logo, rebranding itself.

== See also ==
- Mobile ticketing
- Ticket system
- E-mail ticketing system
