= Vernon Township High School =

High school in Sussex County, New Jersey, US

Location
- 1834 Route 565; Vernon Township, Sussex County, New Jersey 07462; United States; 41.250367°N 74.49028°W

Information
- Type: Public high school
- Established: September 1975
- NCES School ID: 341671005422
- Principal: Lindsay Leduc-Young
- Faculty: 75.3 FTEs
- Grades: 9–12
- Enrollment: 912 (as of 2023–24)
- Student to teacher ratio: 12.1:1
- Colors: Navy blue and gold
- Athletics conference: Northwest Jersey Athletic Conference (general); North Jersey Super Football Conference (football)
- Mascot: Vernon Viking
- Team name: Vikings
- Website: www.vtsd.com/o/vths

Vernon Township High School is a four-year comprehensive public high school located in Vernon Township, in Sussex County, in the U.S. state of New Jersey. The school opened in 1975 and serves students in ninth through twelfth grades as the lone secondary school of the Vernon Township School District. The school has gone through expansions over the years including a new wing with several classrooms; the gymnasium was doubled in size. In April 2007, renovations were started on the auditorium and outdoor fields.

As of the 2023–24 school year, the school had an enrollment of 912 students and 75.3 classroom teachers (on an FTE basis), for a student–teacher ratio of 12.1:1. There were 140 students (15.4% of enrollment) eligible for free lunch and 55 (6.0% of students) eligible for reduced-cost lunch.

== History ==
In the face of "badly overcrowded conditions" at Franklin High School, voters in Vernon approved in 1972 the construction of a new high school for township students that was expected to cost $6.5 million (equivalent to $50.0 million in 2025). The school, constructed on a 65-acre (26 ha) site and a maximum capacity of 1,150, opened in September 1975 with an enrollment of 850 students. Seniors could choose to complete their education at Franklin High School or switch over to the new high school.

Since the 2010–11 year, the school has offered a parent-student portal, which provides parents and students access grades online any time they want. It also shows attendance and where a student stands academically.

== Awards, recognition and rankings ==
Peggy Stewart was recognized by the New Jersey Department of Education as the New Jersey Teacher of the Year for the 2004–05 school year. Stewart, a history, social studies and enrichment teacher, has been on the faculty of Vernon Township High School since 1991.

The school was the 134th-ranked public high school in New Jersey out of 339 schools statewide in New Jersey Monthly magazine's September 2014 cover story on the state's "Top Public High Schools", using a new ranking methodology. The school had been ranked 108th in the state of 328 schools in 2012, after being ranked 152nd in 2010 out of 322 schools listed. The magazine ranked the school 156th in 2008 out of 316 schools. The school was ranked 124th in the magazine's September 2006 issue, which surveyed 316 schools across the state. Schooldigger.com ranked the school 162nd out of 381 public high schools statewide in its 2011 rankings (an increase of 7 positions from the 2010 ranking) which were based on the combined percentage of students classified as proficient or above proficient on the mathematics (80.5%) and language arts literacy (94.6%) components of the High School Proficiency Assessment (HSPA).

In the 2013–14 school year, Vernon Township High School ranked fourth in Sussex County out of nine other public high schools in SAT scores.

== Extracurricular activities ==
=== Sports ===
The Vernon Township High School Vikings participate in the Northwest Jersey Athletic Conference, which includes public and private high schools in Hunterdon, Sussex and Warren counties and was established following a reorganization of sports leagues in Northern New Jersey by the New Jersey State Interscholastic Athletic Association (NJSIAA). The school had participated in the Sussex County Interscholastic League until the SCIL was dissolved in 2009 as part of the NJSIAA realignment. With 751 students in grades 10–12, the school was classified by the NJSIAA for the 2019–20 school year as Group II for most athletic competition purposes, which included schools with an enrollment of 486 to 758 students in that grade range. The football team competes in the Patriot Blue division of the North Jersey Super Football Conference, which includes 112 schools competing in 20 divisions, making it the nation's biggest football-only high school sports league. The school was classified by the NJSIAA as Group II North for football for 2024–2026, which included schools with 484 to 683 students.

The school participates as the host school / lead agency for a joint wrestling team with Wallkill Valley Regional High School. This co-op program operates under agreements scheduled to expire at the end of the 2023–24 school year.

In early 2021, plans were made for the high school to renovate the football field and surrounding track through FieldTurf. It is expected to be approved on May 1, 2021.

Since the school has begun participating in league sports throughout the county and state, the Vernon Vikings have received numerous awards and championships.

Two such teams are the boys' and girls' cross country; Ray Morris and Brian Cummins have been in charge of the teams, winning many championships. In the 2007 season, the boys' team was third in the S.C.I.L. and moved on to rank second in Group IV Sectionals at the Garret Mountain course in West Paterson, during the season being ranked as high as 7th in the state. In the 1980s, Doug Castellana led the team to a number of SCIL championships. In 2009, coaches Jim Shenise and girl coach took over and in 2010, they led the girls' team to take 3rd at the New Jersey Group IV sectionals. The school's legacy of success in cross country dates from the 1978 season, when the team was undefeated and won the S.C.I.L. championship.

The field hockey team won the North I Group II state sectional championship in 1980, the North I Group IV title in 1988–1991, 1995 and 1996, and the North I/II combined Group IV title in 1993.

The boys' wrestling team won the North I Group IV state sectional championship in 1995 and 2002.

The ice hockey team won the McMullen Cup in 2005 with a 5-3 come-from-behind win against Ridgewood High School in the championship game played at South Mountain Arena.

The girls' varsity ski team won the 2009 New Jersey Interscholastic Ski Racing Association (NJISRA) overall state championship.

The Varsity Softball team won the North I Group II, 2017 Northwest New Jersey Athletic Conference, Freedom League Championship. In 2018, the team won their first Hunterdon-Warren-Sussex (HWS) tri-county tournament with a victory against North Hunterdon High School.

=== Music ===
The school band program includes a Concert Band, Wind Ensemble, Marching Band, Jazz Express, Percussion Ensemble, Brass Choir, Clarinet Choir, Saxophone Ensemble and a Flute Choir. The choir program consists of a Symphonic Choir, Meistersingers, Concert Choir Mixed, Concert Choir Women, Close Harmony, Les Chanteuses and Chanticleer. Both have a regular program of performances. VTHS also has an orchestral program, which students can take at CP level if so desired.

=== Academic Decathlon team ===
The Vernon Township High School Academic Decathlon team competes every year in the United States Academic Decathlon. The Vikings's Academic Decathlon team finished fourth in their region overall in 2018 with a second place "Super Quiz" finish, but were not able to compete in the state competition due to hazardous weather. The curricular theme that season was Africa. In 2019, improved to a third place overall finish despite a drop to third place in the "Super Quiz" in their region. The curricular theme that season was The 1960s: A Transformational Decade.

=== Robotics Team ===
The school's FIRST Robotics Competition team started in 2007, and was designated the team number "1989". In the 2007 "Rack 'n Roll" season, the Viking Robotics Team finished 24th out of 53 teams in the New York City FRC Regional. On May 12, 2007, the team finished in 2nd place at PARC X, an off-season competition held at the Tunkhannock Area High School.

In the 2008 "Overdrive" season, the Vernon Robotics Team won the FRC NYC Regionals along with FRC teams 41 and 555, and attended the FIRST Championship in Atlanta, Georgia.

During the 2009 "Lunacy" season, the team placed 44th out of 66 teams at the NYC Regional, but were 2nd place finalists along with teams 1807 and 56 at Brunswick Eruption 8, an off-season competition held at North Brunswick Township High School on October 31, 2009.

In 2010 game "Breakaway", the team did not win the NYC Regional, but won the PARC XIII off-season competition also at the Tunkhannock Area High School with FRC teams 25 and 341.

The 2011 season, "Logo Motion", was the first time the team was ranked within the highest eight teams at the NYC Regional, thus allowing them to choose partner teams 1279 and 2070 to compete in the elimination rounds, before being defeated in a semi-final match.

The Viking Robotics team maintains a website that gives updates for the community and competitive events that they partake in.

== Financial ==
In 2006, a multimillion-dollar budget was approved to renovate Vernon Township High School as well as Walnut Ridge and Rolling Hills Elementary Schools. Included were two more tennis courts in addition to the existing four, a renovated auditorium with new sound systems and more seating, replacement of the current six-lane track with a state-of-the art eight-lane track along with artificial turf on the football field, more seating, bathroom facilities, and lighting.

== Administration ==
The school's principal is Lindsay Leduc-Young. Core members of her administration include the two assistant principals.

== Notable alumni ==
- Katie Henry, blues rock singer, guitarist, pianist and songwriter
- Ryan Izzo (born 1995) football tight end who played in the NFL for the New England Patriots
- Danny Kass (born 1982), professional snowboarder who won a silver medal in Men's halfpipe in Snowboarding at the 2002 Winter Olympics
- Patty Paine (born 1965), poet, author and scholar
