= Hopatcong High School =

High school in Sussex County, New Jersey, US

Location
- 2 Windsor Avenue; Hopatcong, Sussex County, New Jersey 07843; United States
- 40.927203°N 74.670788°W

Information
- Type: Public high school
- Established: 1969
- School district: Hopatcong Public Schools
- CEEB code: 31050
- NCES School ID: 340744005362
- Principal: Christian Jensen (Academic Affairs); Stephanie Martinez (Student Affairs and Athletics)
- Faculty: 43.5 FTEs
- Grades: 8-12
- Enrollment: 506 (as of 2024–25)
- Student to teacher ratio: 11.6:1
- Colors: Green and white
- Athletics conference: Northwest Jersey Athletic Conference (general); North Jersey Super Football Conference (football)
- Rival: Lenape Valley Regional High School
- Website: www.hopatcongschools.org/hs/

Hopatcong High School is a four-year comprehensive public high school serving students in ninth through twelfth grades from Hopatcong, in Sussex County, in the U.S. state of New Jersey, operating as the lone secondary school of the Hopatcong Public Schools.

As of the 2024–25 school year, the school had an enrollment of 506 students and 43.5 classroom teachers (on an FTE basis), for a student–teacher ratio of 11.6:1. There were 126 students (24.9% of enrollment) eligible for free lunch and 52 (10.3% of students) eligible for reduced-cost lunch.

== History ==
During the 1960–61 school year, there were 200 students from Hopatcong attending Sparta High School, with an expectation that the number of students from Hopatcong sent to high school in Sparta would increase by about 10% annually in subsequent years.

The school opened for the 1969–70 school year, with approximately 625 students in grades 7–12. The loss of students from Hopatcong at Sparta High School caused a drop of almost half of the enrollment in the prior year.

== Awards, recognition and rankings ==
The school was ranked 235th in New Jersey out of 339 schools statewide in New Jersey Monthly magazine's September 2014 cover story on the state's "Top Public High Schools", using a new ranking methodology. The school had been ranked 289th in the state of 328 schools in 2012, after being ranked 200th in 2010 out of 322 schools listed. The magazine ranked the school 174th in 2008 out of 316 schools. The school was ranked 158th in the magazine's September 2006 issue, which surveyed 316 schools across the state.

In the 2013–2014 school year, Hopatcong High School ranked eighth in Sussex County out of nine other public high schools in SAT scores.

== Extracurricular activities ==
The Hopatcong High School Chiefs compete in the Northwest Jersey Athletic Conference, which is comprised of public and private high schools in Morris, Sussex and Warren counties, and was established following a reorganization of sports leagues in Northern New Jersey by the New Jersey State Interscholastic Athletic Association (NJSIAA). Prior to the 2010 realignment, the school participated in the Sussex County Interscholastic League until the SCIL was dissolved in 2009. With 312 students in grades 10-12, the school was classified by the NJSIAA for the 2019–20 school year as Group I for most athletic competition purposes, which included schools with an enrollment of 75 to 476 students in that grade range. The football team competes in the National Blue division of the North Jersey Super Football Conference, which includes 112 schools competing in 20 divisions, making it the nation's biggest football-only high school sports league. The school was classified by the NJSIAA as Group I North for football for 2024–2026, which included schools with 254 to 474 students.

Hopatcong High School maintains a variety of boys' and girls' interscholastic sports teams including cross country, soccer, cheerleading, wrestling, basketball, bowling, golf, track and field, softball, baseball and tennis.

The school participates as the host school / lead agency for joint cooperative boys / girls bowling teams with Mount Olive High School, while Mount Olive is the host school for a co-op ice hockey team that also includes Hackettstown High School. These co-op programs operate under agreements scheduled to expire at the end of the 2023–24 school year. The ice hockey partnership with Mount Olive started in the 2014-15 school year and plays under the Mount Olive name.

The boys' wrestling team won the 1997 North I Group II state sectional championship.

The football team was the North I Group II state sectional champion in 2001 and 2005. The 2001 team finished the season with a 10-2 record, coming back from a 21-point deficit to defeat Mahwah High School in the North I Group II championship game by a score of 36-35 on a field goal scored with seconds left on the clock. In 2005, the team beat Sparta High School 20-14 in overtime in the final game of the tournament.

In 2004, the boys' varsity cross-country team became the North I, Group II state champions. In 2005, the boys' cross country team finished 15th in the state at the New Jersey Meet of Champions. The same year, the team successfully defended its state sectional title and was second in Group II

The boys' track team had three consecutive undefeated seasons, from 2010 to 2012.

== Administration ==
The school's principals are Christian Jensen (Academic Affairs) and Stephanie Martinez (Student Affairs and Athletics).

== Notable alumni ==
- Joe Hewitt (born 1978)f, software programmer best known for his work on the Mozilla Firefox web browser
- Joe Martinek (born 1989), New Jersey high school football's all-time leading rusher with 7,589 total yards
- Zach Rey (born 1989), former wrestler who represented the United States at the 2015 World Wrestling Championships
- Dave Yovanovits (born 1981), former NFL offensive lineman, who played for the New Orleans Saints
