= Hopatcong Public Schools =

School district in Sussex County, New Jersey, US

Address
- 2 Windsor Avenue Hopatcong, Sussex County, New Jersey, 07843; United States
- Coordinates: 40.9395°N 74.658556°W

District information
- Grades: PreK-12
- Superintendent: Arthur DiBenedetto
- Business administrator: Carolyn Joseph
- Schools: 4

Students and staff
- Enrollment: 1,449 (as of 2020–21)
- Faculty: 146.1 FTEs
- Student–teacher ratio: 9.9:1

Other information
- District Factor Group: FG
- Website: www.hopatcongschools.org
Ind.	Per pupil	District spending	Rank (*)	K-12 average	%± vs. average
1A	Total Spending	$20,284	38	$18,891	7.4%
1	Budgetary Cost	15,912	39	14,783	7.6%
2	Classroom Instruction	9,104	39	8,763	3.9%
6	Support Services	2,436	35	2,392	1.8%
8	Administrative Cost	1,982	46	1,485	33.5%
10	Operations & Maintenance	2,104	46	1,783	18.0%
13	Extracurricular Activities	257	2	268	−4.1%
16	Median Teacher Salary	78,750	47	64,043
Data from NJDoE 2014 Taxpayers' Guide to Education Spending. *Of K-12 districts with up to 1,800 students. Lowest spending=1; Highest=49

The Hopatcong Public Schools are a comprehensive community public school district that serves students in pre-kindergarten through twelfth grade from Hopatcong, in Sussex County, in the U.S. state of New Jersey.

As of the 2020–21 school year, the district, comprised of four schools, had an enrollment of 1,449 students and 146.1 classroom teachers (on an FTE basis), for a student–teacher ratio of 9.9:1.

To address a significant reduction in state aid, Hudson Maxim School, which had served grades PreK-1, was closed at the end of the 2018-19 school year. For the 2019-20 school year, the grades were reconfigured across the remaining four school facilities.

The district is classified by the New Jersey Department of Education as being in District Factor Group "FG", the fourth-highest of eight groupings. District Factor Groups organize districts statewide to allow comparison by common socioeconomic characteristics of the local districts. From lowest socioeconomic status to highest, the categories are A, B, CD, DE, FG, GH, I and J.

== Schools ==
Schools in the district (with 2020–21 enrollment data from the National Center for Education Statistics) are:

Elementary schools

- Tulsa Trail Elementary School with 249 students in grades PreK-1
  - Brian Byrne, principal
- Durban Avenue School with 227 students in grades 2-3
  - Katherine McFadden, principal

Middle school

- Hopatcong Middle School with 459 students in grades 4-7
  - Lewis Benfatti, Principal

High school

- Hopatcong High School with 499 students in grades 8-12
  - Stephanie Martinez, principal

== Administration ==
Core members of the district's administration are:

- Art DiBenedetto, superintendent of schools
- Jeff Hallenbeck, business administrator and board secretary

== Board of education ==
The district's board of education, comprised of nine members, sets policy and oversees the fiscal and educational operation of the district through its administration. As a Type II school district, the board's trustees are elected directly by voters to serve three-year terms of office on a staggered basis, with three seats up for election each year held (since 2012) as part of the November general election. The board appoints a superintendent to oversee the district's day-to-day operations and a business administrator to supervise the business functions of the district.
