= Hopatcong, New Jersey =

Borough in Sussex County, New Jersey, US

- Borough
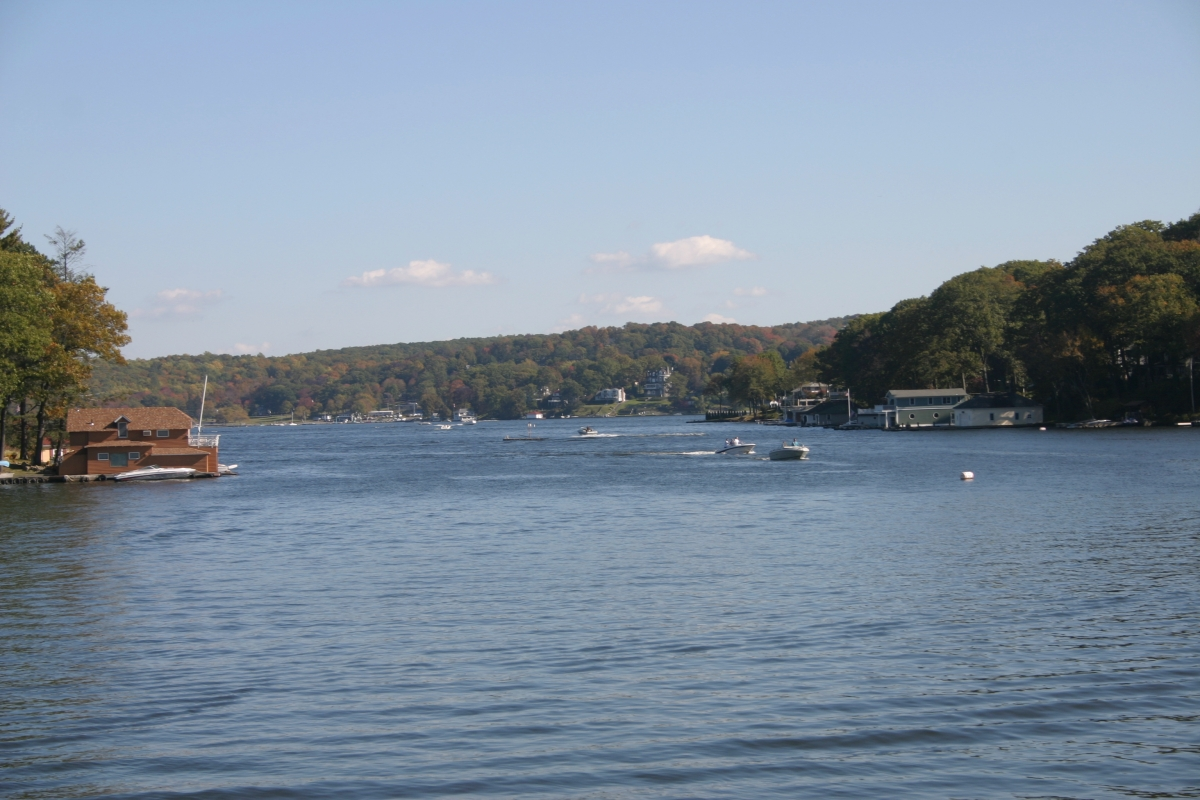
- Lake Hopatcong as seen from Hopatcong

- Seal

- Map of Hopatcong Borough in Sussex County. Inset: Location of Sussex County in the State of New Jersey.

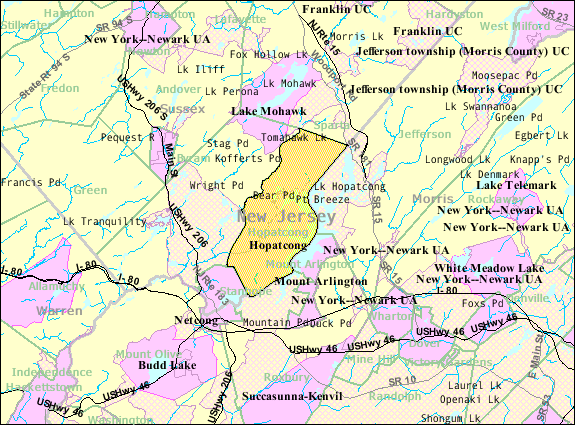
- Census Bureau map of Hopatcong, New Jersey

- Location in Sussex County Location in New Jersey Location in the United States
- Coordinates: 40.951649°N 74.662377°W
- Country: United States
- State: New Jersey
- County: Sussex
- Incorporated: April 2, 1898 as Brooklyn
- Renamed: March 22, 1901 as Hopatcong

Government
  - Type: Borough
  - Body: Borough Council
  - Mayor: Marie Galate (R, term ends December 31, 2027)
  - Administrator: Gregg Schuster (interim)
  - Municipal clerk: Valerie Egan

Area
  - Total: 12.42 sq mi (32.16 km^{2})
  - Land: 10.88 sq mi (28.19 km^{2})
  - Water: 1.53 sq mi (3.97 km^{2}) 11.83%
  - Rank: 186th of 565 in state 16th of 24 in county
- Elevation: 997 ft (304 m)

Population (2020)
  - Total: 14,362
  - Estimate (2023): 14,622
  - Rank: 183rd of 565 in state 3rd of 24 in county
  - Density: 1,318.9/sq mi (509.2/km^{2})
  - Rank: 353rd of 565 in state 6th of 24 in county
- Time zone: UTC−05:00 (Eastern (EST))
  - Summer (DST): UTC−04:00 (Eastern (EDT))
- ZIP Code: 07843
- Area code: 973
- FIPS code: 3403732910
- GNIS feature ID: 0885259
- Website: www.hopatcong.org

Hopatcong (/hoʊˈpætkɒŋ/ hoh-PAT-kong) is a borough in Sussex County, in the U.S. state of New Jersey. As of the 2020 United States census, the borough's population was 14,362.

== History ==
The town of Hopatcong has a rich history, given its relationship with New York City. It borders Lake Hopatcong, a partially man-made lake that is now a source of much recreation and desirable real estate, and is the biggest lake in New Jersey. The community, 40 miles (64 km) west of New York City, began as a summer getaway for the wealthy in NYC who primarily sought access to the lake. An amusement park, called "Bertrand's Island", sprang up and was accessible via the lake, trolley or by car through Mount Arlington. The construction of Interstate 80, a highway that stretches from Teaneck, New Jersey, all the way across the country to San Francisco, California, triggered rapid growth in New York City's suburbs and led to Hopatcong becoming a permanent residential community. The area had been called "Brookland" in the 19th century and the lake that was expanded to become Lake Hopatcong had been known as "Great Pond" or "Brookland Pond". During the 1830s, the name of the community had been modified to "Brooklyn", to match the spelling of the city on New York's Long Island. Hopatcong was originally established as the Town of Brooklyn on April 2, 1898, from portions of Byram Township. On March 22, 1901, the Borough of Hopatcong replaced Brooklyn. In 1922, residents of Byram Cove, Northwood, and other areas to the west of the original land area of the borough, voted to leave Byram Township and join Hopatcong, leaving the Borough with its current borders.

While the origin of the borough's name is unclear, it is said to derive from Native American phrases variously meaning "stone over water" or "pipestone", among other variations.

== Geography ==
According to the United States Census Bureau, the borough had a total area of 12.35 square miles (31.99 km^{2}), including 10.89 square miles (28.21 km^{2}) of land and 1.46 square miles (3.78 km^{2}) of water (11.83%).

Unincorporated communities, localities and place names located partially or completely within the borough include Bear Pond, Byram Cove, Cow Tongue Point, Davis Cove, Glasser, Hendersons Cove, Roseville, Sharps Rock and Sperry Springs.

Hopatcong borders Byram Township, Sparta Township and Stanhope in Sussex County; and Jefferson Township, Mount Arlington and Roxbury Township in Morris County.

== Demographics ==
Historical population
Census	Pop.	Note	%±
1900	75		—
1910	146		94.7%
1920	179		22.6%
1930	534		198.3%
1940	660		23.6%
1950	1,173		77.7%
1960	3,391		189.1%
1970	9,052		166.9%
1980	15,531		71.6%
1990	15,586		0.4%
2000	15,888		1.9%
2010	15,147		−4.7%
2020	14,362		−5.2%
2023 (est.)	14,622	▲	1.8%
Population sources: 1800–1920; 1900–1910 1910–1930; 1940–2000 2000; 2010 2020

=== 2020 census ===
As of the 2020 census, Hopatcong had a population of 14,362. The median age was 43.4 years. 17.2% of residents were under the age of 18 and 16.0% of residents were 65 years of age or older. For every 100 females there were 101.9 males, and for every 100 females age 18 and over there were 100.9 males age 18 and over.

96.3% of residents lived in urban areas, while 3.7% lived in rural areas.

There were 5,724 households in Hopatcong, of which 26.3% had children under the age of 18 living in them. Of all households, 52.4% were married-couple households, 18.6% were households with a male householder and no spouse or partner present, and 20.8% were households with a female householder and no spouse or partner present. About 24.2% of all households were made up of individuals and 8.0% had someone living alone who was 65 years of age or older.

There were 6,393 housing units, of which 10.5% were vacant. The homeowner vacancy rate was 3.0% and the rental vacancy rate was 5.2%.

Racial composition as of the 2020 census
Race	Number	Percent
White	11,101	77.3%
Black or African American	466	3.2%
American Indian and Alaska Native	75	0.5%
Asian	370	2.6%
Native Hawaiian and Other Pacific Islander	3	0.0%
Some other race	927	6.5%
Two or more races	1,420	9.9%
Hispanic or Latino (of any race)	2,544	17.7%

=== 2010 census ===
The 2010 United States census counted 15,147 people, 5,653 households, and 4,110 families in the borough. The population density was 1,395.5 per square mile (538.8/km^{2}). There were 6,296 housing units at an average density of 580.0 per square mile (223.9/km^{2}). The racial makeup was 91.07% (13,794) White, 2.91% (441) Black or African American, 0.11% (16) Native American, 2.25% (341) Asian, 0.02% (3) Pacific Islander, 1.76% (266) from other races, and 1.89% (286) from two or more races. Hispanic or Latino residents of any race were 11.32% (1,714) of the population.

Of the 5,653 households, 31.9% had children under the age of 18; 58.0% were married couples living together; 9.6% had a female householder with no husband present and 27.3% were non-families. Of all households, 21.0% were made up of individuals and 5.4% had someone living alone who was 65 years of age or older. The average household size was 2.68 and the average family size was 3.13.

22.4% of the population was under the age of 18, 7.9% from 18 to 24, 28.0% from 25 to 44, 32.0% from 45 to 64, and 9.8% was 65 years of age or older. The median age was 40.2 years. For every 100 females, the population had 101.0 males. For every 100 females ages 18 and older there were 101.5 males.

The Census Bureau's 2006–2010 American Community Survey showed that (in 2010 inflation-adjusted dollars) median household income was $85,730 (with a margin of error of +/− $4,570) and the median family income was $95,962 (+/− $5,996). Males had a median income of $60,533 (+/− $5,094) versus $47,515 (+/− $7,133) for females. The per capita income for the borough was $36,033 (+/− $2,406). About 1.6% of families and 3.0% of the population were below the poverty line, including 3.8% of those under age 18 and 4.3% of those age 65 or over.

=== 2000 census ===
As of the 2000 United States census there were 15,888 people, 5,656 households, and 4,236 families residing in the borough. The population density was 1,449.7 inhabitants per square mile (559.7/km^{2}). There were 6,190 housing units at an average density of 564.8 per square mile (218.1/km^{2}). The racial makeup of the borough was 93.10% White, 1.95% African American, 0.11% Native American, 1.80% Asian, 1.42% from other races, and 1.61% from two or more races. Hispanic or Latino residents of any race were 5.99% of the population.

There were 5,656 households, out of which 38.7% had children under the age of 18 living with them, 62.3% were married couples living together, 8.3% had a female householder with no husband present, and 25.1% were non-families. 18.6% of all households were made up of individuals, and 4.2% had someone living alone who was 65 years of age or older. The average household size was 2.81 and the average family size was 3.24.

In the borough 26.4% of the population was under the age of 18, 7.1% was from 18 to 24, 34.8% from 25 to 44, 24.9% from 45 to 64, and 6.8% was 65 years of age or older. The median age was 36 years. For every 100 females, there were 102.0 males. For every 100 females age 18 and over, there were 100.1 males.

The median income for a household in the borough was $65,799, and the median income for a family was $73,277. Males had a median income of $47,083 versus $34,238 for females. The per capita income for the borough was $26,698. About 2.2% of families and 3.0% of the population were below the poverty line, including 2.7% of those under age 18 and 5.8% of those age 65 or over.

== Government ==
=== Local government ===
Hopatcong is governed under the borough form of New Jersey municipal government, one of 218 municipalities (of the 564) statewide, making it the most common form of government in New Jersey. The governing body is comprised of the mayor and the borough council, with all positions elected at-large on a partisan basis as part of the November general election. The mayor is elected directly by the voters to a four-year term of office. The borough council includes six members elected to serve three-year terms on a staggered basis, with two seats coming up for election each year in a three-year cycle. The borough form of government used by Hopatcong is a "weak mayor / strong council" government in which council members act as the legislative body with the mayor presiding at meetings and voting only in the event of a tie. The mayor can veto ordinances subject to an override by a two-thirds majority vote of the council. The mayor makes committee and liaison assignments for council members, and most appointments are made by the mayor with the advice and consent of the council.

As of 2024, the mayor of Hopatcong Borough is Republican Marie Galate, whose term of office ends December 31, 2027. Members of the Hopatcong Borough Council are Bradley Hoferkamp (R, 2025), Jennifer Johnson (R, 2025), Dawn Roberts (R, 2024), Rachel Rodriguez (R, 2026), Christine Smith (R, 2025) and Ryan Smith (R, 2024).

In December 2016, the borough council chose Michael Francis from three candidates nominated by the Republican municipal committee to fill the seat expiring in December 2019 that had been held by Sylvia Petillo until she resigned from office the previous month in advance of taking a seat on the Sussex County Board of Chosen Freeholders; Francis will serve on an interim basis until the November 2017 general election, when voters will choose a candidate to serve the balance of the term of office. In turn, Bradley Hoferkamp was chosen to fill the council seat vacated by Francis, including the three-year term that Francis had won in November 2016; Hoferkamp will also serve until November 2017, when the balance of the term will be filled by a candidate selected by voters.

In May 2014, the borough council appointed Frank Padula to fill the vacancy of Richard Hoer, who had resigned the previous month. Padula served on an interim basis until the November 2014 general election, when he ran unopposed and won the balance of the term of office expiring in December 2016.

=== Federal, state, and county representation ===
Hopatcong is located in the 7th Congressional District and is part of New Jersey's 24th state legislative district.

Prior to the 2010 Census, Hopatcong had been part of the 5th Congressional District; the change was made by the New Jersey Redistricting Commission and took effect in January 2013, based on the results of the November 2012 general elections.

For the 119th United States Congress, New Jersey's 7th congressional district is represented by Thomas Kean Jr. (R, Westfield). New Jersey is represented in the United States Senate by Democrats Cory Booker (Newark, term ends 2027) and Andy Kim (Moorestown, term ends 2031).

For the 2026–2027 session, the 24th legislative district of the New Jersey Legislature is represented in the State Senate by Parker Space (R, Wantage Township) and in the General Assembly by Dawn Fantasia (R, Franklin) and Mike Inganamort (R, Chester Township).

Sussex County is governed by a Board of County Commissioners whose five members are elected at-large in partisan elections on a staggered basis, with either one or two seats coming up for election each year. At an annual reorganization meeting held in the beginning of January, the board selects a Commissioner Director and Deputy Director from among its members, with day-to-day supervision of the operation of the county delegated to a County Administrator. As of 2025, Sussex County's Commissioners are Director Jill Space (R, Wantage Township, 2025), Deputy Director Chris Carney (R, Frankford Township, 2027), Jack DeGroot (R, Sussex, 2026), William Hayden (I, Branchville, 2025) and Alan Henderson (R, Lafayette Township, 2027).

Constitutional officers elected on a countywide basis are Clerk Jeffrey M. Parrott (R, Wantage Township, 2026), Sheriff Michael F. Strada (R, Hampton Township, 2025) and Surrogate Gary R. Chiusano (R, Frankford Township, 2028).

=== Politics ===
As of March 2011, there were a total of 9,554 registered voters in Hopatcong, of whom 1,917 (20.1% vs. 16.5% countywide) were registered as Democrats, 3,242 (33.9% vs. 39.3%) were registered as Republicans and 4,383 (45.9% vs. 44.1%) were registered as Unaffiliated. There were 12 voters registered as Libertarians or Greens. Among the borough's 2010 Census population, 63.1% (vs. 65.8% in Sussex County) were registered to vote, including 81.3% of those ages 18 and over (vs. 86.5% countywide).

Gubernatorial election results for Hopatcong
Year	Republican		Democratic		Third party(ies)	
Year	No.	%	No.	%	No.	%
2025	3,378	55.50%	2,661	43.72%	47	0.77%
2021	3,318	66.57%	1,602	32.14%	64	1.28%
2017	2,358	58.92%	1,459	36.46%	185	4.62%
2013	2,906	71.31%	1,016	24.93%	153	3.75%
2009	3,089	64.25%	1,206	25.08%	513	10.67%
2005	2,244	55.09%	1,542	37.86%	287	7.05%

In the 2012 presidential election, Republican Mitt Romney received 3,285 votes (55.0% vs. 59.4% countywide), ahead of Democrat Barack Obama with 2,560 votes (42.9% vs. 38.2%) and other candidates with 117 votes (2.0% vs. 2.1%), among the 5,973 ballots cast by the borough's 9,652 registered voters, for a turnout of 61.9% (vs. 68.3% in Sussex County). In the 2008 presidential election, Republican John McCain received 3,941 votes (54.7% vs. 59.2% countywide), ahead of Democrat Barack Obama with 3,096 votes (43.0% vs. 38.7%) and other candidates with 117 votes (1.6% vs. 1.5%), among the 7,199 ballots cast by the borough's 9,571 registered voters, for a turnout of 75.2% (vs. 76.9% in Sussex County). In the 2004 presidential election, Republican George W. Bush received 4,003 votes (59.4% vs. 63.9% countywide), ahead of Democrat John Kerry with 2,616 votes (38.8% vs. 34.4%) and other candidates with 98 votes (1.5% vs. 1.3%), among the 6,739 ballots cast by the borough's 9,182 registered voters, for a turnout of 73.4% (vs. 77.7% in the whole county).

United States presidential election results for Hopatcong 2024 2020 2016 2012 2008 2004
Year	Republican		Democratic		Third party(ies)	
Year	No.	%	No.	%	No.	%
2024	4,861	60.17%	3,060	37.88%	158	1.96%
2020	4,775	56.76%	3,458	41.10%	180	2.14%
2016	4,276	60.62%	2,436	34.53%	342	4.85%
2012	3,285	55.10%	2,560	42.94%	117	1.96%
2008	3,941	55.09%	3,096	43.28%	117	1.64%
2004	4,003	59.60%	2,616	38.95%	98	1.46%

In the 2013 gubernatorial election, Republican Chris Christie received 71.3% of the vote (2,906 cast), ahead of Democrat Barbara Buono with 24.9% (1,016 votes), and other candidates with 3.8% (153 votes), among the 4,110 ballots cast by the borough's 9,777 registered voters (35 ballots were spoiled), for a turnout of 42.0%. In the 2009 gubernatorial election, Republican Chris Christie received 3,089 votes (63.2% vs. 63.3% countywide), ahead of Democrat Jon Corzine with 1,260 votes (25.8% vs. 25.7%), Independent Chris Daggett with 441 votes (9.0% vs. 9.1%) and other candidates with 72 votes (1.5% vs. 1.3%), among the 4,888 ballots cast by the borough's 9,454 registered voters, yielding a 51.7% turnout (vs. 52.3% in the county).

United States Senate election results for Hopatcong1
Year	Republican		Democratic		Third party(ies)	
Year	No.	%	No.	%	No.	%
2024	4,477	57.67%	2,972	38.28%	314	4.04%
2018	3,366	58.65%	1,991	34.69%	382	6.66%
2012	2,991	51.77%	2,499	43.25%	288	4.98%
2006	2,279	56.26%	1,541	38.04%	231	5.70%

United States Senate election results for Hopatcong2
Year	Republican		Democratic		Third party(ies)	
Year	No.	%	No.	%	No.	%
2020	4,509	55.03%	3,414	41.67%	270	3.30%
2014	1,945	58.03%	1,312	39.14%	95	2.83%
2013	1,685	62.45%	979	36.29%	34	1.26%
2008	3,518	50.78%	3,039	43.87%	371	5.36%

== Education ==
Students in public school for pre-kindergarten through twelfth grade are served by the Hopatcong Public Schools. As of the 2020–21 school year, the district, comprised of four schools, had an enrollment of 1,449 students and 146.1 classroom teachers (on an FTE basis), for a student–teacher ratio of 9.9:1. To address a significant reduction in state aid, Hudson Maxim School, which had served grades Pre-K–1, was closed at the end of the 2018–19 school year. For the 2019–2020 school year, the grades were reconfigured across the remaining four school facilities. Schools in the district (with 2020–21 enrollment data from the National Center for Education Statistics) are Tulsa Trail Elementary School with 249 students in grades Pre-K–1, Durban Avenue School with 227 students in grades 2–3, Hopatcong Middle School with 459 students in grades 4–7 and Hopatcong High School with 499 students in grades 8–12.

== Transportation ==
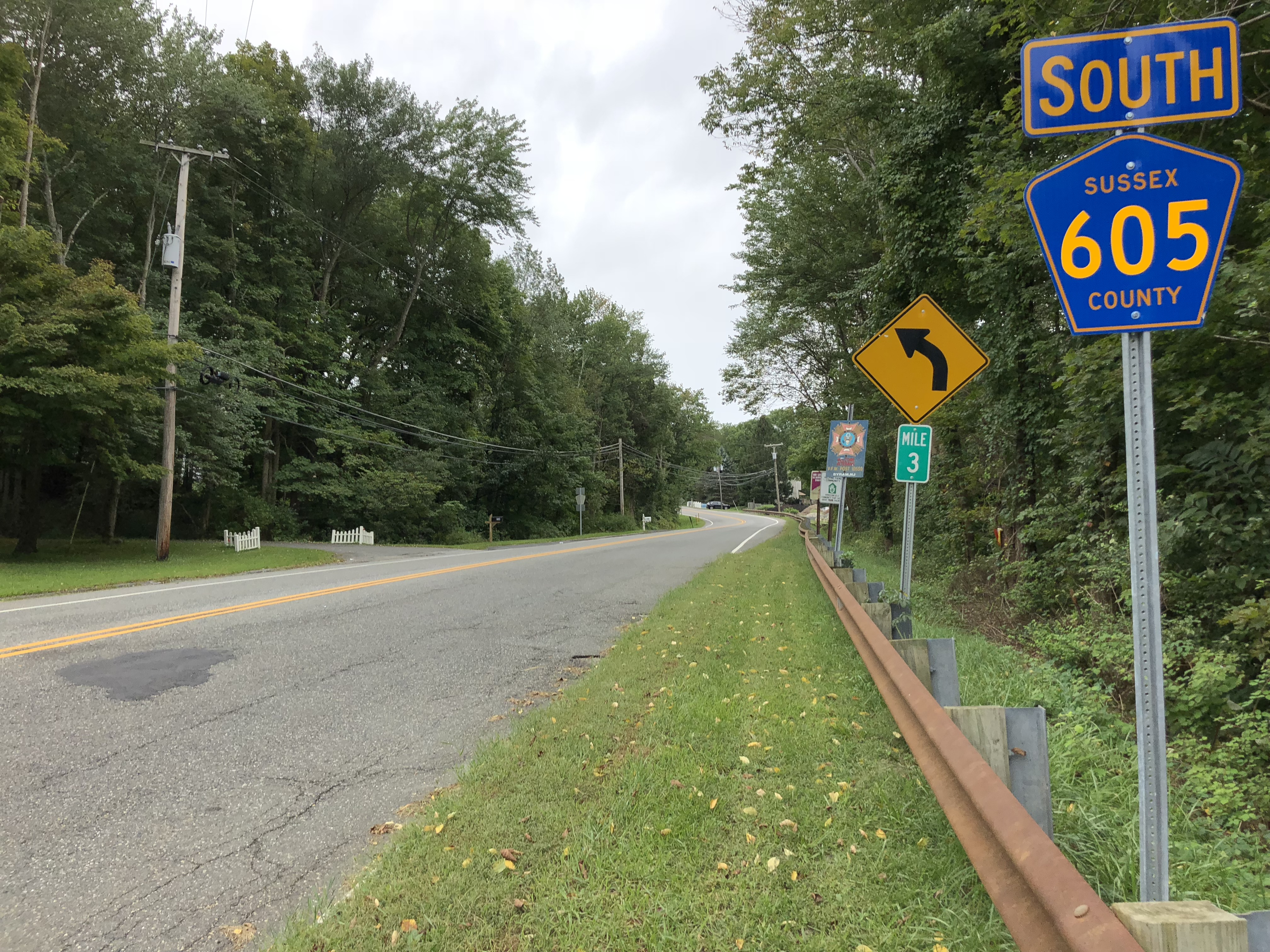
County Route 605 (Stanhope-Sparta Road) southbound in Hopatcong

As of May 2010, the borough had a total of 78.70 miles (126.66 km) of roadways, of which 65.33 miles (105.14 km) were maintained by the municipality and 13.37 miles (21.52 km) by Sussex County.

No Interstate, U.S., state or major county highways enter Hopatcong. The only roads serving the borough are minor county routes, such as County Route 605 and County Route 607, and municipally-maintained streets.

== Events ==
Hopatcong holds annual American Power Boat Association (APBA) boat races that attract the local residents to a day at the lake. Hopatcong is also known for its yearly "Hopatcong Days" that offer a weekend of events that include a parade, and an array of festivities in Modick Park, sponsored by the local Business Association and including an annual Soap Box Derby and Car Show.

The Lake Hopatcong Historical Museum holds a variety of local historical artifacts.

== Notable people ==
People who were born in, residents of, or otherwise closely associated with Hopatcong include:

- Joe Cook (1890–1959), vaudeville actor who lived on the shores of Lake Hopatcong in a house he named "Sleepless Hollow"
- Lotta Crabtree (1847–1924), actress
- Joe Martinek (born 1989), leading football rusher in New Jersey high school history
- Hudson Maxim (1853–1927), inventor and chemist who is the namesake of the district's Hudson Maxim School
- Zach Rey (born 1989), former wrestler who represented the United States at the 2015 World Wrestling Championships
- Brandon Sklenar (born 1990), actor best known for his roles in the films Mapplethorpe, Vice, Midway and It Ends with Us
- Dave Yovanovits (born 1981), former NFL offensive lineman
