= Vernon Township School District =

School district in Sussex County, New Jersey, US

Address
- 539 County Route 515 Vernon Township, Sussex County, New Jersey, 07462; United States
- Coordinates: 41.196128°N 74.534403°W

District information
- Grades: PreK-12
- Superintendent: Eveny de Mendez
- Business administrator: Raymond Slamb
- Schools: 6

Students and staff
- Enrollment: 2,941 (as of 2023–24)
- Faculty: 236.0 FTEs
- Student–teacher ratio: 12.5:1

Other information
- District Factor Group: FG
- Website: www.vtsd.com
Ind.	Per pupil	District spending	Rank (*)	K-12 average	%± vs. average
1A	Total Spending	$21,084	85	$18,891	11.6%
1	Budgetary Cost	17,094	91	14,783	15.6%
2	Classroom Instruction	10,112	92	8,763	15.4%
6	Support Services	2,949	87	2,392	23.3%
8	Administrative Cost	1,636	80	1,485	10.2%
10	Operations & Maintenance	2,032	85	1,783	14.0%
13	Extracurricular Activities	355	91	268	32.5%
16	Median Teacher Salary	72,026	84	64,043
Data from NJDoE 2014 Taxpayers' Guide to Education Spending. *Of K-12 districts with more than 3,500 students. Lowest spending=1; Highest=103

The Vernon Township School District is a comprehensive community public school district, that serves students in pre-kindergarten through twelfth grade from Vernon Township, in Sussex County, in the U.S. state of New Jersey.

As of the 2023–24 school year, the district, comprised of six schools, had an enrollment of 2,941 students and 236.0 classroom teachers (on an FTE basis), for a student–teacher ratio of 12.5:1.

== History ==
In 1972, voters approved spending $6.5 million (equivalent to $48.9 million in 2024) for a high school to accommodate 1,300 students that would replace the sending/receiving relationship under which students were sent to an overcrowded Franklin High School. Enrollment was 850 when the school opened in September 1975 on a 65-acre (26 ha) site. Seniors could choose to complete their education at Franklin High School or switch over to the new high school.

Peggy Stewart, a teacher at Vernon Township High School, was named New Jersey Teacher of the Year for 2004–05.

The district had been classified by the New Jersey Department of Education as being in District Factor Group "FG", the fourth-highest of eight groupings. District Factor Groups organize districts statewide to allow comparison by common socioeconomic characteristics of the local districts. From lowest socioeconomic status to highest, the categories are A, B, CD, DE, FG, GH, I and J.

== Schools ==
Schools in the district (with 2023–24 enrollment data from the National Center for Education Statistics) are:

Elementary schools

- Walnut Ridge School with 89 students in PreK
  - Suzanne MacDougall, principal
- Cedar Mountain Primary School with 424 students in grades K–1
  - Kristin Gudenkauf, principal
- Rolling Hills Primary School with 406 students in grades 2–3
  - Pauline Anderson, principal
- Lounsberry Hollow School with 428 students in grades 4–5
  - Marc Citro, principal

Middle school

- Glen Meadow Middle School with 640 students in grades 6–8
  - Jacquelyn Van Orden, principal

High school

- Vernon Township High School with 912 students in grades 9–12
  - Lindsay LeDuc Young, principal

== Administration ==
Core members of the district's administration are:

- Eveny de Mendez, superintendent of schools
- Raymond Slamb, business administrator and board secretary

== Board of education ==
The district's board of education, comprised of nine members, sets policy and oversees the fiscal and educational operation of the district through its administration. As a Type II school district, the board's trustees are elected directly by voters to serve three-year terms of office on a staggered basis, with three seats up for election each year held (since 2012) as part of the November general election. The board appoints a superintendent to oversee the district's day-to-day operations and a business administrator to supervise the business functions of the district.
