= Lenape Valley Regional High School =

School district in Sussex County, New Jersey, US

Address
- 28 Stanhope Sparta Road Stanhope, Sussex County, New Jersey, 07874; United States
- Coordinates: 40.9207°N 74.6985°W

District information
- Grades: 9-12
- Superintendent: Michael Rossi
- Business administrator: Danielle Tarvin
- Schools: 1

Students and staff
- Enrollment: 668 (as of 2024–25)
- Faculty: 58.0 FTEs
- Student–teacher ratio: 11.5:1

Other information
- District Factor Group: GH
- Website: www.lvhs.org
Ind.	Per pupil	District spending	Rank (*)	9-12 average	%± vs. average
1A	Total Spending	$19,569	14	$18,891	3.6%
1	Budgetary Cost	14,617	16	15,592	−6.3%
2	Classroom Instruction	7,896	11	8,807	−10.3%
6	Support Services	2,492	29	2,294	8.6%
8	Administrative Cost	1,756	32	1,592	10.3%
10	Operations & Maintenance	1,567	9	1,954	−19.8%
13	Extracurricular Activities	884	25	873	1.3%
16	Median Teacher Salary	66,643	21	71,726
Data from NJDoE 2014 Taxpayers' Guide to Education Spending. *Of 9-12 districts with any number of students. Lowest spending=1; Highest=47

Lenape Valley Regional High School

Information
- Type: Public
- Established: 1974
- NCES School ID: 340850005378
- Principal: Doug Reynolds
- Vice principal: Eric Schuman
- Faculty: 58.0 FTEs
- Enrollment: 667 (as of 2024–25)
- Student to teacher ratio: 11.5:1
- Colors: Red; White; Blue
- Athletics conference: Northwest Jersey Athletic Conference (general); North Jersey Super Football Conference (football)
- Team name: Patriots
- Newspaper: Patriot Press
- Yearbook: Renaissance

Lenape Valley Regional High School is a four-year comprehensive public high school and school district in serving students in ninth through twelfth grades from two municipalities in Sussex County and one in Morris County, in the U.S. state of New Jersey. The communities served by the high school are Byram Township and Stanhope Borough in Sussex County and Netcong Borough in Morris County. The school is located in Stanhope. It is the lone school of the Lenape Valley Regional High School District.

As of the 2024–25 school year, the school had an enrollment of 667 students and 58.0 classroom teachers (on an FTE basis), for a student–teacher ratio of 11.5:1. There were 93 students (13.9% of enrollment) eligible for free lunch and 25 (3.7% of students) eligible for reduced-cost lunch.

The district participates in the Interdistrict Public School Choice Program, which allows non-resident students to attend school in the district at no cost to their parents, with tuition covered by the resident district. Available slots are announced annually by grade.

Lenape Valley had been the only high school in Sussex County with a planetarium. In February 2016, the board of education voted to eliminate the planetarium and use the space for science labs.

== History ==
Netcong High School closed in 1974 and Lenape Valley began serving students from Netcong and those from Byram Township and Stanhope. Byram Township had sent their students to Sparta High School, but was told they had to leave due to increasing enrollment at Sparta.

The school opened in September 1974 with an enrollment of 737 students.

The district had been classified by the New Jersey Department of Education as being in District Factor Group "GH", the third-highest of eight groupings. District Factor Groups organize districts statewide to allow comparison by common socioeconomic characteristics of the local districts. From lowest socioeconomic status to highest, the categories are A, B, CD, DE, FG, GH, I and J.

During an outbreak that hit the area on May 28, 2019, the school suffered minor damage from an EF1 tornado that touched down in trees behind the school.

== Awards, recognition and rankings ==
The school was the 180th-ranked public high school in New Jersey out of 339 schools statewide in New Jersey Monthly magazine's September 2014 cover story on the state's "Top Public High Schools", using a new ranking methodology. The school had been ranked 120th in the state of 328 schools in 2012, after being ranked 108th in 2010 out of 322 schools listed. The magazine ranked the school 105th out of 316 schools statewide in its September 2008 cover story. The school was ranked 139th in the magazine's September 2006 issue, which surveyed 316 schools across the state.

Schooldigger.com ranked the school tied for 145th out of 381 public high schools statewide in its 2011 rankings (an increase of 2 positions from the 2010 ranking) which were based on the combined percentage of students classified as proficient or above proficient on the mathematics (82.9%) and language arts literacy (95.1%) components of the High School Proficiency Assessment (HSPA).

In the 2013-14 school year, Lenape Valley Regional High School ranked seventh in SAT scores in Sussex County out of nine other public high schools.

== Extracurricular activities ==
Lenape Valley Regional High School offers a selection of sports, including football, soccer, cross country, tennis, wrestling, field hockey, swimming, basketball, and cheerleading. The school also has a weight room available. The school also offers business activities, creative writing-based courses and music courses, including choirs and bands.

=== Athletics ===
The Lenape Valley Regional High School Patriots participate in the Northwest Jersey Athletic Conference, which is comprised of public and private high schools from Morris, Sussex and Warren counties and was established following a reorganization of sports leagues in Northern New Jersey by the New Jersey State Interscholastic Athletic Association (NJSIAA). Until the NJSIAA's 2009 realignment, the school had participated in the Sussex County Interscholastic League, which included public and private high schools located in Sussex County and northern Morris County. With 534 students in grades 10-12, the school was classified by the NJSIAA for the 2019–20 school year as Group II for most athletic competition purposes, which included schools with an enrollment of 486 to 758 students in that grade range. The football team competes in the American White division of the North Jersey Super Football Conference, which includes 112 schools competing in 20 divisions, making it the nation's biggest football-only high school sports league. The school was classified by the NJSIAA as Group I North for football for 2024–2026, which included schools with 254 to 474 students.

The school participates as the host school / lead agency for joint cooperative boys / girls swimming teams with Newton High School and for wrestling with Hopatcong High School, while Newton is the host school for a co-op ice hockey program. These co-op programs operate under agreements scheduled to expire at the end of the 2027–28 school year.

The football team won the North I Group II state sectional championships in 1977, 1981, 1989–1991, 1993 and 1999. The team won its first playoff-era title in 1977 with a 6-2 win against Tenafly High School in the North I Group II sectional championship game. The 1981 team finished the season with a 7-2 record after a winning the North I Group II with a 7-6 win against Tenafly in the playoff finals. The 1989 team finished the season with an 11-0 record after a 28-0 win against River Dell High School in the North I Group II state sectional championship game. The 1990 team won the North I Group II sectional title with an 18-17 win against Lodi High School in the tournament final. In front of 3,500 fans, the 1991 team finished the season with an 11-0 record after defeating Lodi in overtime by a score of 28-27 on a missed extra point in the North I Group II championship game. The Patriots made it to the 2004 NJSIAA Group II Section I state championship at Giants Stadium, falling in double overtime to Lakeland Regional High School Lancers by a score of 17-14. Head coach Don Smolyn came into the 2020 season having won seven state championships in 14 playoff appearances and an overall career record of 342-137-13 in his 45 years leading the team, making him the state's winningest active coach.

The field hockey team won the North I Group II state sectional championship in 1978 and 1990.

The boys' wrestling team won the North I Group II state sectional championship in 1985 and 2015, the North I Group III titles in 1998 and 1999, won the North II Group I title in 2009 and the North II Group II title in 2016. The Patriots wrestling team in the 2005–06 season was 21-7, ranked 16th in New Jersey, and won District 2. The Patriots wrestling team in the 2008–09 season finished 18-5, ranked 15th in the state, and won the North II Group I state sectional title, the program's first since 1999, after defeating Elmwood Park Memorial High School 40-23. The team had won sectional titles in 1985 in North I Group II and in both 1998 and 1999 in North I Group III.

The softball team won the Group II state championship in 1990 (defeating Colonia High School in the finals) and 1991 (vs. Pennsville Memorial High School). The 1990 team finished the season 20-6 after winning the Group II title with a 1-0 defeat of a Colonia team that had come into the championship game undefeated.

== Special education ==
The school staff includes 17 special education teachers. The school offers support to the visually, hearing and physically impaired, through special classes and extra-curricular help. The school also provides assistance with speech therapy and development.

== Notable alumni ==
- Alicia Luciano (born 1983), Miss New Jersey 2002
- Manny Oudin (born 1968), former professional soccer player who was head soccer coach of the Lehigh University women's soccer team
- Adam Riggs (born 1972), former Los Angeles Angels player known for his misspelled "Angees" jersey in a 2003 game

== Administration ==
Core members of the district's and school's administration are:

- Michael Rossi, superintendent
- Douglas Reynolds, principal

== Board of education ==
The district's board of education, comprised of nine members, sets policy and oversees the fiscal and educational operation of the district through its administration. As a Type II school district, the board's trustees are elected directly by voters to serve three-year terms of office on a staggered basis, with three seats up for election each year held (since 2012) as part of the November general election. The board appoints a superintendent to oversee the district's day-to-day operations and a business administrator to supervise the business functions of the district. Seats on the high school district's nine-member board of education are allocated based on the populations of the constituent municipalities, with five seats assigned to Byram Township and two seats each to Netcong and Stanhope.
