= Port Jervis City School District =

School district in New York

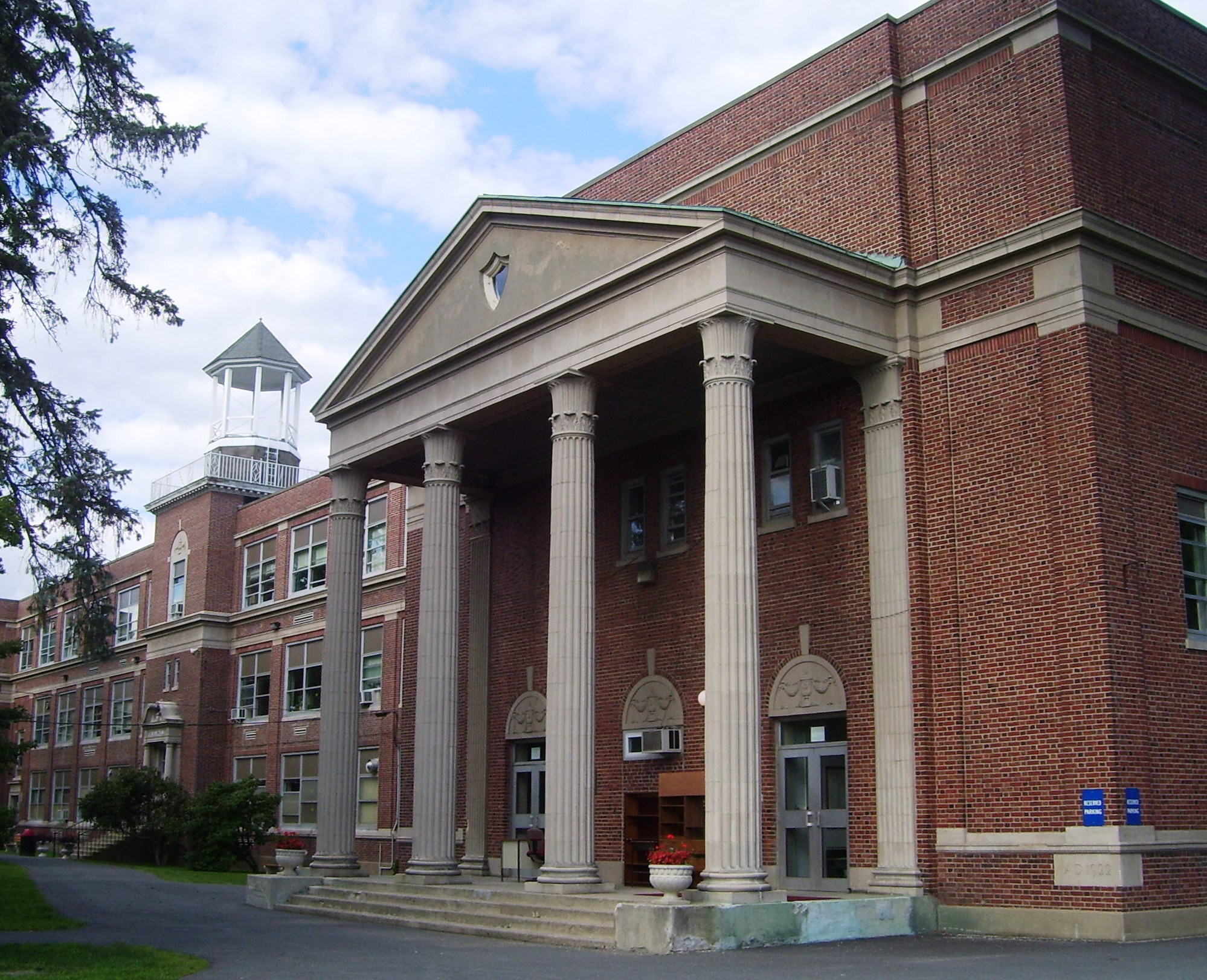
- Port Jervis Middle School (the building is now East Main Elementary School while Port Jervis Middle School moved to another location), a school that is run by Port Jervis City School District

Address
- 10 Route 209 Port Jervis, New York (postal address), 12771; United States

District information
- Type: Local school district
- Grades: K–12
- Superintendent: John Bell
- Schools: 4
- NCES District ID: 3623520

Students and staff
- Students: 2,504
- Teachers: 225.52
- Staff: 148.79
- Student–teacher ratio: 11.1:1
- Colors: Red and black

Other information
- Website: www.pjschools.org

Port Jervis City School District (PJCSD) is an American school district headquartered in Deerpark, New York, with a Port Jervis postal address. The district runs four schools, 2 elementary schools, 1 middle school, and one high school. The district's students come from Port Jervis and sections of Deerpark, including Sparrow Bush, in Orange County. It also serves sections of Forestburgh and Mamakating in Sullivan County.

== History ==
In 2017, the school board decided to remove Tom Bongiovi as superintendent, with a severance of almost $299,262; Bongiovi left on July 25, 2017. By 2018, the school board had selected Mike Rydell as the new superintendent.

On July 19, 2022, Port Jervis City School District held a meeting where it named John Bell the new superintendent. Previously, Bell had served as the superintendent of the nearby Delaware Valley School District from 2012 to 2022. He also graduated from Port Jervis High School, The High School run by the district, in 1985.

== Demographics ==
From 1923, the Montague Township School District of Montague Township, New Jersey sent its high school-aged students to Port Jervis High School; the Montague district was the only New Jersey school district to send its students outside of New Jersey to complete certain grade levels. The district also sent middle school-aged students to Port Jervis Middle School. In 2013, the Montague district decided to begin sending its students to High Point Regional High School instead, effective September 2014. Some parents had sought to continue sending their children to Port Jervis High, so High Point officials were looking into possible agreements related to that. By 2017, all grade levels for high school students were to be sent to High Point. The Montague District also began housing middle school students at the Montague School.

As a result, the Port Jervis District was projected to lose $1,800,000 by 2018 towards lost tuition fees that were previously paid by Montague Township. The Port Jervis district planned to spread the impact of the tuition loss across several fiscal years. By 2016 the Montague district owed the Port Jervis district $441,327 in tuition, causing the latter to sue the former.

The district had stated in its 2019-2020 profile that "the community has a relatively low socioeconomic status".

In 2013, the district had 128 students enrolled at the secondary level who were from Montague Township, New Jersey.

== Schools ==
- Port Jervis High School (Deerpark, with a Port Jervis postal address)
- Port Jervis Middle School (Deerpark, with a Port Jervis postal address) - It was formerly in what became East Main Elementary School; the elementary and middle school students began switching places in 2022.
- East Main Elementary School (Port Jervis) - The building opened circa 1922.
- Hamilton Bicentennial Elementary School (Cuddebackville, Deerpark)

The middle and high school are on the same property.

Former schools

- Previously Anna S. Kuhl Elementary School was on the Port Jervis HS property. In 2022 the district began the process of moving elementary school students to the former Port Jervis Middle School, while the middle school would move into the former elementary property.

== Facilities ==
The district's headquarters are on the secondary school property in Deerpark, within the middle school building. It was previously headquartered in Port Jervis city. In 2020 the district announced plans to move the headquarters into the new middle school.
