= Port Jervis High School =

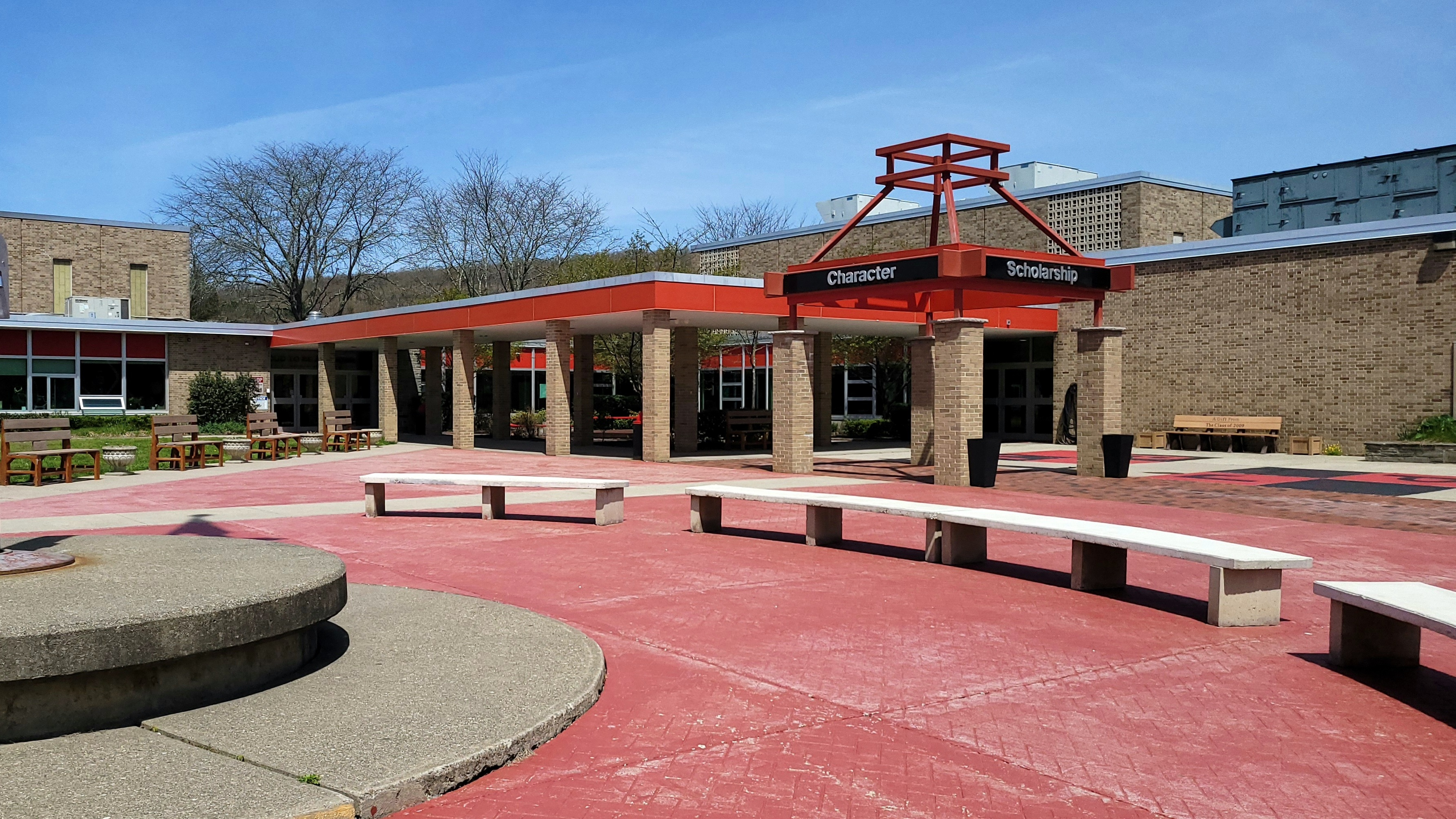
- Port Jervis High School as seen from the front

Location
- 10 Route 209; Port Jervis postal address, United States, New York 12771; United States; 41.3798°N 74.6740°W

Information
- School type: Public, high school
- Established: c. 1960
- Status: Open
- School district: Port Jervis City School District
- Principal: Anthony Lazzaro
- Teaching staff: 69.92 (FTE)
- Grades: 9-12
- Enrollment: 734 (2023–2024)
- Student to teacher ratio: 10.50
- Language: English
- Colors: Red and Black
- Team name: Raiders
- Rival: Middletown High School
- Communities served: Port Jervis; Town of Deerpark (part); Town of Forestburgh (part); Town of Mamakating (part)
- Website: Port Jervis High School

Port Jervis High School (PJHS or "Port") is a public high school in Deerpark, New York, with a Port Jervis postal address. A part of Port Jervis City School District, it is on U.S. Route 209.

Andrew Marotta, former principal of Port Jervis High, wrote a book about his experiences, The Principal, Surviving and Thriving: 125 Points of Wisdom, Practical Tips, and Relatable Stories for all School Principals.

Its zone includes Port Jervis and sections of Deerpark, including Sparrow Bush, in Orange County. It also serves sections of Forestburgh and Mamakating in Sullivan County.

== History ==
From circa 1928, the Montague Township School District of Montague Township, New Jersey sent its high school-aged students to Port Jervis High; the Montague district was the only New Jersey school district to send its students outside of New Jersey to complete certain grade levels. Because the Montague Township students graduated from Port Jervis High, they qualified for in-state tuition rates at universities in two states.

In 2013 the Montague district decided to begin sending its students to High Point Regional High School instead, effective September 2014. Some parents sought to continue sending their children to Port Jervis High, so High Point officials were looking into possible agreements related to that. By 2017 all grade levels for high school students were to be sent to High Point HS. Families of 20 Port Jervis HS students resident in Montague opposed a New Jersey commissioner order saying they could not continue attending that school and got a settlement on June 20, 2016, that allowed them to complete their high school education there.

Previously the high school shared its property with Anna S. Kuhl Elementary School.

== Athletics ==
Port Jervis High School's football team is named the Raiders. The team has a historic rivalry with Middletown High School's football team, the Middies. An annual game is played between these two teams called the Erie Bell Game. The game is named after the trophy, an old railroad bell originating from a train on the Port Jervis-Middletown line. The first of these games was held in 1897 and is an alternating home and away game. Middletown is currently leading the series with a 72-58-7 lead on Port Jervis as of 2015. The Raiders most recent win happened in September 2022 when they won against the Middies 33 to 19. As of 2014, the Erie Bell Game was added to the list of the U.S. Marines Great American Rivalry games.

== Academic achievement ==
In the 2011–2012 school year Port Jervis High had a 73% graduation rate overall, with an 82% graduation rate among Montague Township students.

== Notable alumni ==
- Ed and Lou Banach (class of 1978), Wrestlers who were gold medalists in freestyle wrestling at the 1984 Summer Olympics
- E. Arthur Gray (class of 1943), Former Mayor of Port Jervis from 1978 to 1988 and New York State Senator for the 39th district from 1989 to 1990
- William C. Norris (class of 1945), Major general in the United States Air Force
