= Sussex Christian School =

Sussex Christian School may refer to one of the following schools:

- Sussex Christian School (New Jersey), founded 1952, pre-kindergarten to grade 8
- Sussex Christian School (New Brunswick), founded 1982, pre-kindergarten to grade 12
