= Sussex-Wantage Regional School District =

School district in Sussex County, New Jersey, US

Address
- 31 Ryan Road Wantage, Sussex County, New Jersey, 07461; United States
- Coordinates: 41.22945°N 74.605612°W

District information
- Grades: PreK-8
- Superintendent: Michael Gall
- Business administrator: Christina Riker
- Schools: 3

Students and staff
- Enrollment: 1,159 (as of 2024–25)
- Faculty: 112.5 FTEs
- Student–teacher ratio: 10.3:1

Other information
- District Factor Group: FG
- Website: www.swregional.org
| Ind. | Per pupil | District spending | Rank (*) | K-8 average | %± vs. average |
|---|---|---|---|---|---|
| 1A | Total Spending | $18,686 | 65 | $18,891 | −1.1% |
| 1 | Budgetary Cost | 15,955 | 77 | 14,159 | 12.7% |
| 2 | Classroom Instruction | 10,177 | 80 | 8,659 | 17.5% |
| 6 | Support Services | 2,257 | 53 | 2,167 | 4.2% |
| 8 | Administrative Cost | 1,748 | 67 | 1,547 | 13.0% |
| 10 | Operations & Maintenance | 1,564 | 46 | 1,612 | −3.0% |
| 13 | Extracurricular Activities | 96 | 43 | 104 | −7.7% |
| 16 | Median Teacher Salary | 63,010 | 56 | 61,136 |
Data from NJDoE 2014 Taxpayers' Guide to Education Spending. *Of K-8 districts with more than 750 students. Lowest spending=1; Highest=84

The Sussex-Wantage Regional School District is a comprehensive regional public school district that serves students in pre-kindergarten through eighth grade from Sussex Borough and Wantage Township, two municipalities in northern Sussex County, in the U.S. state of New Jersey.

As of the 2024–25 school year, the district, comprised of three schools, had an enrollment of 1,159 students and 112.5 classroom teachers (on an FTE basis), for a student–teacher ratio of 10.3:1.

For ninth through twelfth grades, public school students from both Sussex and Wantage attend High Point Regional High School, together with students from Branchville, Frankford Township, Lafayette Township and Montague Township. As of the 2024–25 school year, the high school had an enrollment of 791 students and 67.6 classroom teachers (on an FTE basis), for a student–teacher ratio of 11.7:1.

== History ==
With the opening of High Point Regional High School in September 1966, Sussex High School was closed, which had served students from both Sussex and Wantage. With the closure of the high school, the building was repurposed as Sussex Middle School.

The district had been classified by the New Jersey Department of Education as being in District Factor Group "FG", the fourth-highest of eight groupings. District Factor Groups organize districts statewide to allow comparison by common socioeconomic characteristics of the local districts. From lowest socioeconomic status to highest, the categories are A, B, CD, DE, FG, GH, I and J.

== Schools ==
Schools in the district (with 2024–25 enrollment data from the National Center for Education Statistics) are:

- Clifton E. Lawrence School in Wantage, with 426 students in grades PreK–2
  - Kaleigh Themelakis, principal
- Wantage Elementary School in Wantage, with 396 students in grades 3–5
  - Christopher Gregory, principal
- Sussex Middle School in Sussex, with 291 students in grades 6–8
  - Shane Schwarz, principal

== Administration ==
Core members of the district's administration are:

- Michael Gall, superintendent
- Christina M. Riker, business administrator and board secretary

== Board of education ==
The district's board of education, composed of nine members, sets policy and oversees the fiscal and educational operation of the district through its administration. As a Type II school district, the board's trustees are elected directly by voters to serve three-year terms of office on a staggered basis, with three seats up for election each year held (since 2012) as part of the November general election. The board appoints a superintendent to oversee the district's day-to-day operations and a business administrator to supervise the business functions of the district. Seats on the board are allocated based on the population of the constituent municipalities, with eight seats assigned to Wantage Township and one to Sussex.
