= Montague Township School District =

School district in Sussex County, New Jersey, US

Address
- 475 Route 206 Montague Township, Sussex County, New Jersey, 07827; United States
- Coordinates: 41.287678°N 74.792018°W

District information
- Grades: K-8
- Superintendent: James Andriac (acting)
- Business administrator: Michael Bussow
- Schools: 1

Students and staff
- Enrollment: 309 (as of 2023–24)
- Faculty: 37.5 FTEs
- Student–teacher ratio: 8.2:1

Other information
- District Factor Group: B
- Website: www.montagueschool.org
Ind.	Per pupil	District spending	Rank (*)	K–8 average	%± vs. average
1A	Total Spending	$22,934	57	$18,891	21.4%
1	Budgetary Cost	16,965	50	14,159	19.8%
2	Classroom Instruction	10,508	54	8,659	21.4%
6	Support Services	2,640	43	2,167	21.8%
8	Administrative Cost	1,971	67	1,547	27.4%
10	Operations & Maintenance	1,802	39	1,612	11.8%
13	Extracurricular Activities	15	6	104	−85.6%
16	Median Teacher Salary	57,415	32	61,136
Data from NJDoE 2014 Taxpayers' Guide to Education Spending. *Of K–8 districts with up to 400 students. Lowest spending=1; Highest=71

The Montague Township School District is a comprehensive community public school district that serves students in pre-kindergarten through eighth grade from Montague Township, in Sussex County, in the U.S. state of New Jersey.

As of the 2023–24 school year, the district, comprised of one school, had an enrollment of 309 students and 37.5 classroom teachers (on an FTE basis), for a student–teacher ratio of 8.2:1.

Public school students in ninth through twelfth grades attend High Point Regional High School. High Point also serves students from Branchville Borough, Frankford Township, Lafayette Township, Sussex Borough and Wantage Township (where the school is located). As of the 2023–24 school year, the high school had an enrollment of 803 students and 73.2 classroom teachers (on an FTE basis), for a student–teacher ratio of 11.0:1. Students may also enroll at Sussex County Technical School, which accepts students on a selective basis, or to the middle school charter program in Sparta Township.

The district had been classified by the New Jersey Department of Education as being in District Factor Group "B", the second lowest of eight groupings. District Factor Groups organize districts statewide to allow comparison by common socioeconomic characteristics of the local districts. From lowest socioeconomic status to highest, the categories are A, B, CD, DE, FG, GH, I and J.

== History ==
For more than 80 years until 2013, the Montague district sent its high school-aged students to Port Jervis High School, of the Port Jervis City School District of Port Jervis, New York; the Montague district was the only New Jersey school district to send its students outside of New Jersey to complete certain grade levels. Because the Montague Township students graduated from Port Jervis High, they qualified for in-state tuition rates at universities in two states. The district also sent middle school-aged students to Port Jervis Middle School. It was the only New Jersey school district that sent students to New York State.

In various periods Montague Township considered switching to High Point Regional High School but the 15 miles (24 km) distance was further than the 12 miles (19 km) to Port Jervis High. James Nani of the Times Herald-Record stated that Deckertown Turnpike, the route between Montague Township and High Point High, may be "treacherous" during inclement weather. Rob Jennings of NJ Advance Media wrote that eventually the district moved to court High Point High because of "a desire by some residents to bring students home".

In 2013, the Montague district decided to begin sending its students to High Point Regional, effective September 2014. By 2017 all grade levels for high school students were to be sent to High Point HS. The Montague district initially negotiated with the Frankford Township School District for the possibility of sending middle schools there. Instead the district expanded to covering middle school with students designated to attend Montague Township School for grades 7-8 instead of Port Jervis Middle effective fall 2016. Families of 20 Port Jervis HS students resident in Montague opposed a New Jersey commissioner order saying they could not continue attending that school and got a settlement on June 20, 2016 that allowed them to complete their high school education there. Eric Obernauer of the New Jersey Herald wrote that the move to High Point "was controversial and followed by the successive turnover of the entire Montague board over the next two years".

The Montague district began seeking to annul the relationship with High Point Regional and resume sending students to Port Jervis. In February 2018 all seven members of the Montague board approved a symbolic resolution to not renew its ties with High Point. Obernauer stated that the Montague-High Point relationship was "frosty" and "icy". The Montague district chose to switch back to Port Jervis because Port Jervis offered a lower tuition than High Point; High Point charged $16,368 per student to Montague. All six members of the Montague district voted, in October 2019, to switch back to Port Jervis. The High Point district sought to block this request on the grounds it and its students would be financially impacted. The Montague district stated that the districts signed an agreement in 2018 that would allow Montague to leave at will.

By December 2020 the districts were in a legal dispute. The High Point agreement was scheduled to end in 2024. Obernauer stated that while Montague School District switching to another school district in New Jersey was "conceivable", "it is questionable if a future [New Jersey] education commissioner would ever agree to have Montague return to sending students out of state to Port Jervis" and that "Even without a formal agreement in place, getting out of send-receive relationships in New Jersey is notoriously difficult and typically requires that the separation have no adverse impact on either district."

By 2021 the Montague board, now with new members, sought to dismiss lawsuits against High Point. Obernauer stated "dissatisfaction with how the Montague district is being run and legal fees spent trying to resume the longstanding relationship with Port Jervis, coupled with a growing acceptance of the High Point relationship, appear to have changed public sentiment."

== Schools ==
Schools in the district (with 2023–24 enrollment data from the National Center for Education Statistics) are:

Elementary schools

- Montague Elementary School, with 308 students in grades PreK–8

Montague School was previously K–6, but when the send-receive agreement with Port Jervis was phased out, the school became K–8. The district had a planned expansion, approved by 4–2 by the school board and scheduled to be put up for a public vote on September 30, 2014.

== Administration ==
Core members of the district's administration are:

- James Andriac, superintendent / principal
- Michael Bussow, business administrator / board secretary

== Board of education ==
The district's board of education, comprised of seven members, sets policy and oversees the fiscal and educational operation of the district through its administration. As a Type II school district, the board's trustees are elected directly by voters to serve three-year terms of office on a staggered basis, with either two or three seats up for election each year held (since 2012) as part of the November general election. The board appoints a superintendent to oversee the district's day-to-day operations and a business administrator to supervise the business functions of the district.

Of the nearly 600 school districts statewide, Montague Township is one of 12 districts with school elections in April, in which voters also decide on passage of the annual school budget. The school board had moved elections from April to November in 2012 and then voted in 2021 to shift elections back to April.
