= Mongaup River =

Stream in the State of New York, United States

Coordinates: 41.42529°N 74.75508°W

The Mongaup River is a stream in the U.S. state of New York. It is a tributary to the Delaware River.

== Etymology ==
The name 'Mongaup' is derived from an Indian language; probably meaning "dancing feather", or "huckeberry valley". Variant spellings include "Mangawping River", "Mingwing River", "Mon-gaw-ping River" and "Mongaap River".

== Course ==
The Mongaup River originates at the confluence of the East Mongaup River and the Middle Mongaup River between Harris and South Fallsburg. The East Mongaup River arises from Sunset Lake in Liberty, New York, and the Middle Mongaup arises from a pond near Aiden Road in Liberty. The river officially takes on the name of Mongaup River after it goes under NY 17 near Harris. Then, the river flows mostly southwest, with an occasional sharp curve, until it joins with the West Branch Mongaup River, where it then makes a sharp turn south, after it passes under NY 17B in Mongaup Valley, New York. About 3,100 feet from the bridge (952 meters), the river widens into the Swinging Bridge Reservoir. It continues through the Swinging Bridge Reservoir for 6.23 miles (10.03 kilometers), until it reaches the Swinging Bridge Hydroelectric Dam. From there, it continues south as a small stream, until it flows under Forestburgh Road (County Route 43). From there, it once again widens into the Mongaup Falls Reservoir, which continues for 1.53 miles (2.46 kilometers). Then, the river once again passes through a hydroelectric dam, and is reduced to a small stream again. After the dam, it travels east for a small segment, and then bends south again. After joining with Black Brook, it then continues further south as the Rio Reservoir, closely followed on the east side by Plank Road. The Rio Reservoir flows south for 4.06 miles (6.53 kilometers), until it reaches the Rio Dam, another hydroelectric power station. The river continues south for about 0.9 miles (1.4 kilometers), until it performs a turn in the southeast direction, only to then flow on westward for about 0.5 miles (0.80 kilometers), and then bend south again, towards the Delaware River for 2.79 miles (4.49 kilometers) until it passes under NY 97 and beside the Mongaup River Trail, and flows into the Delaware River.

== Hydroelectric power ==
The Mongaup River features three hydroelectric dams along its course, all owned by Eagle Creek Renewable Energy. The dams are located at the end of the Swinging Bridge, Mongaup Falls, and Rio Reservoirs. All three dams together produce about 60 million kilowatt hours of hydroelectric power, which goes to serve the citizens of New York.

The dam operator collaborates with paddling clubs and advocacy groups to schedule recreational releases for whitewater paddling.

== Attractions ==
The Mongaup River Valley features a handful of restaurants, hotels, and attractions, making it popular for tourists who are visiting the area. The river features multiple public boat launches on the Swinging Bridge and Rio Reservoirs; and there is a large marina on the Swinging Bridge Reservoir which offers a restaurant and boat rentals. The reservoir has also been stocked with fish by a local nature agency, which makes it a popular destination for fishermen and boaters. Near from where it joins with the Delaware River, the Mongaup River also features the Mongaup River Trail, which runs along the river for 1.7 miles (2.7 kilometers).

== Crossings ==
The Mongaup River is crossed several times, by a variety of roads and highways. Below is a complete listing, ordered from north to south.

Crossings of the Mongaup River
Location	Carries	Length	Notes
Harris, NY	NY 17	19 feet (5.8 meters)	Crosses the East Mongaup River, right before the official start of the Mongaup River
Bethel, NY	Kortright Road/ Coopers Corners Road	78 feet (24 meters)	The name of the road changes right in the center of the bridge
Bethel, NY	NY 17B	109 feet (33 meters)	The bridge was rebuilt in Autumn 2019
Forestburgh, NY	Swinging Bridge Dam Road	974 feet (297 meters)	The dam carries an unnamed dirt road, only used by hydroelectric facility employees accessing the dam. It is not open to the public.
Forestburgh, NY	Forestburgh Road/County Route 43	154 feet (47 meters)	The bridge crosses the river right before it widens into the Mongaup Falls Reservoir.
Forestburgh, NY	Plank Road	44 feet (13 meters)	Technically crosses the Black Brook, but still in very close proximity to the river
Glen Spey, NY and Sparrowbush, NY	Rio Dam Road	1,276 feet (389 meters)	Used primarily by hydroelectric facility workers, but remains open to public use.
Sparrowbush, NY	NY 97	55 feet (17 meters)	Crosses right before the Mongaup river flows into the Delaware River.

== See also ==
- List of rivers of New York
