= Forestburgh Playhouse =

New York summer theater

Coordinates: 41.550378°N 74.753126°W

- Interactive map of Forestburgh Playhouse
- Address: 39 Forestburgh Road; Forestburgh, NY 12777; Forestburgh, New York; United States
- Capacity: 270

Construction
- Opened: July 8, 1947

Website
- fbplayhouse.org

The Forestburgh Playhouse is the oldest continuously operating summer theater, in New York State, 7 mi (11 km) south of Monticello. Founded in 1947 by John Grahame and Alexander Maissel, it was originally the Forestburgh Summer Theatre, until 1980, when the name was changed to the Forestburgh Playhouse.

One of a handful of small summer theaters left in the country. The 270-seat theater operates during the summers only, from mid-June through Labor Day. Summer stock productions include Broadway classics, musicals, and original musicals for children. They also have a musical cabaret after every evening performance, in their adjoining tavern. On a reader's choice article, the Times Herald-Record named the playhouse, one of the Top Ten Attractions, in the Hudson Valley for 2009.

Every year the playhouse hires a company of more than 50, including actors (Equity, to play the leading roles in each show and non-Equity who form the Resident Acting Company who perform, in all main stage musicals, as well as children's theatre (YAFF) and cabaret), Equity stage manager for full season, directors, musicians, designers and technicians. Under an agreement with the Actors’ Equity Association, the union of professional actors and stage managers, the Playhouse employs professional actors, often with Broadway or other major credits, as well as a company of non-union professionals who earn credit toward their own eventual membership in the Actors’ Equity Association.
