= Mongaup Valley, New York =

- Hamlet and CDP
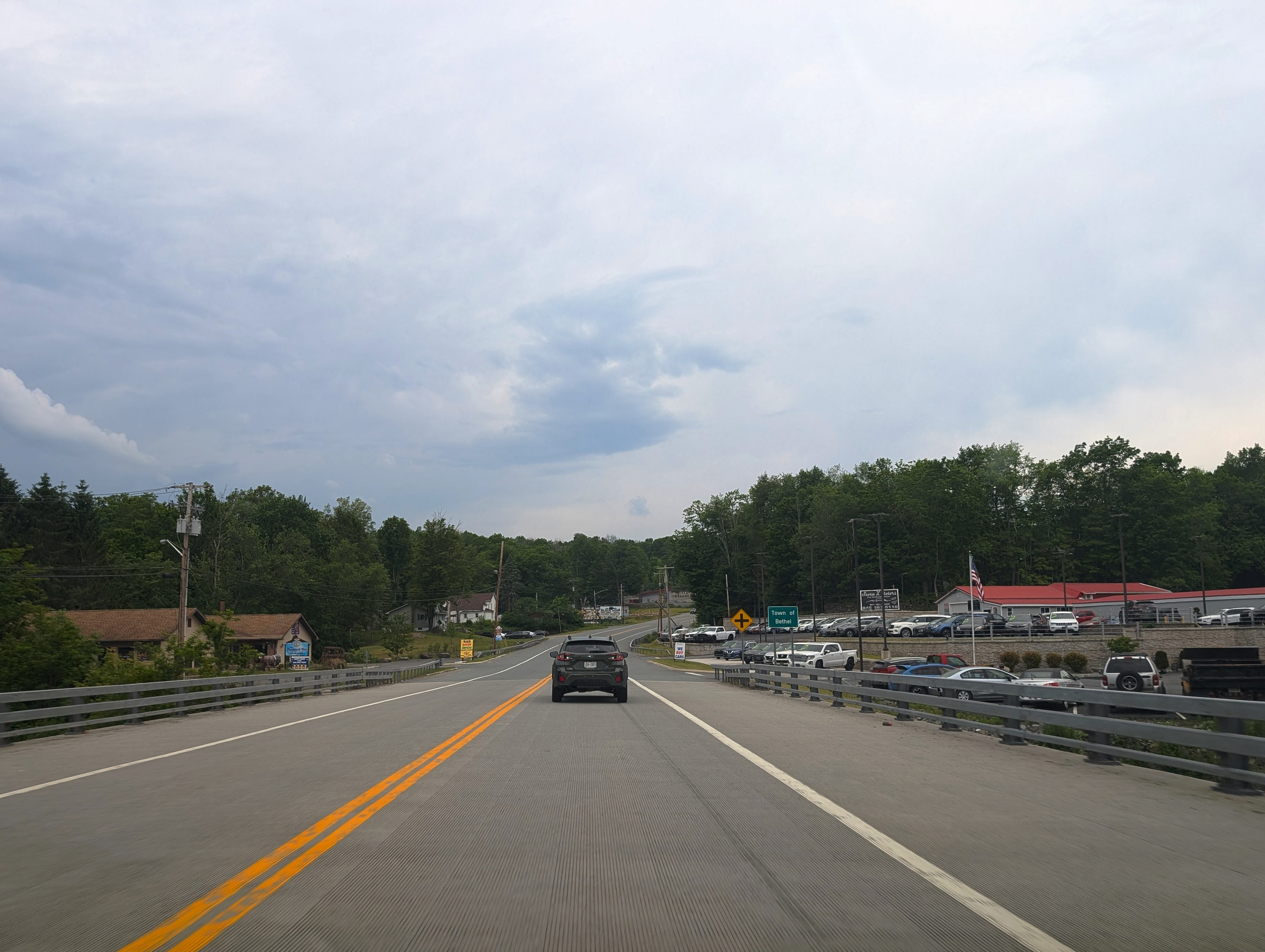
- NY 17B westbound at its crossing of the Mongaup River in the hamlet

- Location within New York Location within the United States
- Coordinates: 41°40′07″N 74°47′05″W
- Country: United States
- State: New York
- County: Sullivan

Area
  - Total: 5.10 sq mi (13.20 km^{2})
  - Land: 5.02 sq mi (12.99 km^{2})
  - Water: 0.081 sq mi (0.21 km^{2})
- Elevation: 1,112 ft (339 m)
- Time zone: UTC-5 (Eastern (EST))
  - Summer (DST): UTC-4 (EDT)
- ZIP code: 12762
- Area code: 845
- GNIS feature ID: 2806972

Mongaup Valley is a hamlet (and census-designated place) in the Town of Bethel, Sullivan County, New York, United States. As of the 2020 census, Mongaup Valley had a population of 236. The community is located along New York State Route 17B 5 miles (8.0 km) west of Monticello, and along the Mongaup River. Mongaup Valley has a post office with ZIP code 12762, which opened on June 22, 1848.

== Notable person ==
- Stephanie Blythe (born 1970), mezzo-soprano
