= William Alexander Linn =

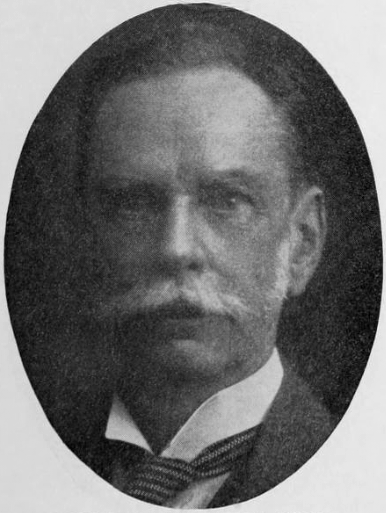
- Born: September 4, 1846; Deckertown, New Jersey, US
- Died: February 23, 1917 (aged 70); Hackensack, New Jersey, US
- Education: Phillips Academy; Yale University
- Occupations: Journalist, historian

William Alexander Linn (September 4, 1846 – February 23, 1917) was a United States journalist and historian.

== Biography ==
William Alexander Linn was born in Deckertown (now Sussex), New Jersey on September 4, 1846. He graduated from Phillips Academy, Andover, Massachusetts, in 1864, at Yale in 1868, and in 1883 was admitted to the New York bar. From 1868 to 1891, he was engaged in newspaper work, during part of that time being on the staff of the New York Tribune, and was managing editor of the Evening Post, 1891–1900, resigning to devote himself to literary work.

He was president of the Hackensack Mutual Building and Loan Association from its organization in 1887 and was president of the People's National Bank of Hackensack, New Jersey, from its organization in 1903 to 1916. He was president of the First National Bank of Ridgefield Park, New Jersey, from its organization in 1910 to 1913. He was elected county collector of Bergen County, New Jersey, January 3, 1916. He was a member of the New Jersey Commission of 1899 which secured the legislation under which the Palisades Interstate Park Commission, which has saved the Palisades front from destruction, was appointed, and was a member of the latter commission from its organization to 1913. He was a member of the National Geographic Society, the New Jersey Historical Society, Bergen County Historical Society, and trustee of the Johnson Public Library of Hackensack.

Linn was a resident of Hackensack, New Jersey. He died there on February 23, 1917.

== Works ==
- Rob and His Gun (1902)
- The Story of the Mormons (1902)
- Horace Greeley, Founder and Editor of the New York Tribune (1903)
