= Forestburgh Town Hall =

- U.S. National Register of Historic Places
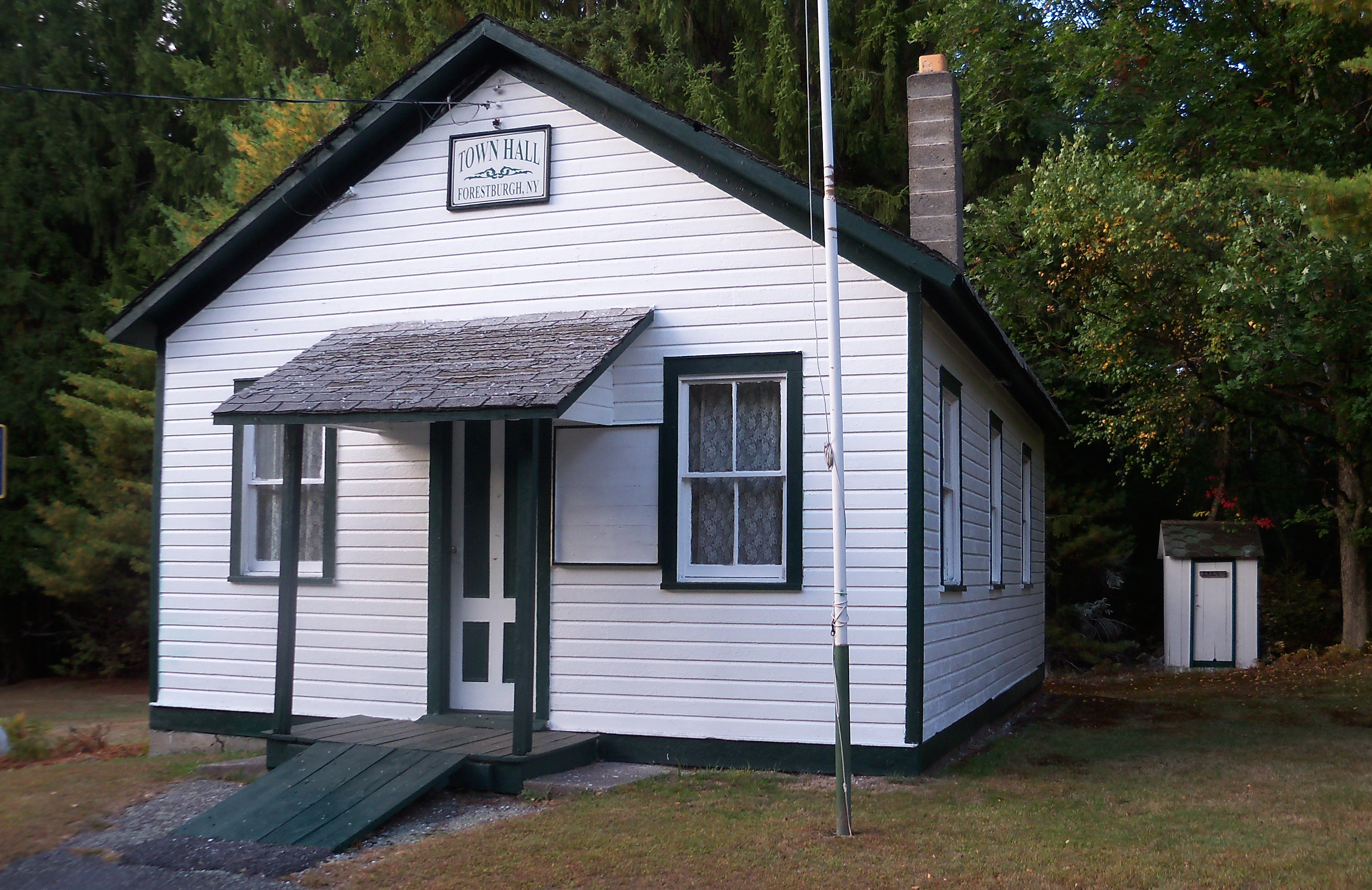

- Location within New York Location within the United States
- Location: 305 Cty Rd. 48, Forestburgh, New York
- Coordinates: 41°32′28.0896″N 74°43′30.3234″W
- Area: less than one acre
- Built: 1929
- NRHP reference No.: 11000278
- Added to NRHP: May 11, 2011

Forestburgh Town Hall is a historic town hall located at Forestburgh in Sullivan County, New York. It was built in 1929 and is a small, rectangular wood-frame building sheathed in novelty wood siding. The building measures 30 feet long and 20 feet wide. It has a gable roof and sits on a concrete foundation. Also located on the property is a small privy built in 1924. The town hall is almost an exact replica of the previous town hall building that stood in the same spot from 1895 until it burned in 1928. It remains virtually unchanged since its construction.

It was added to the National Register of Historic Places in 2011.

== Gallery ==
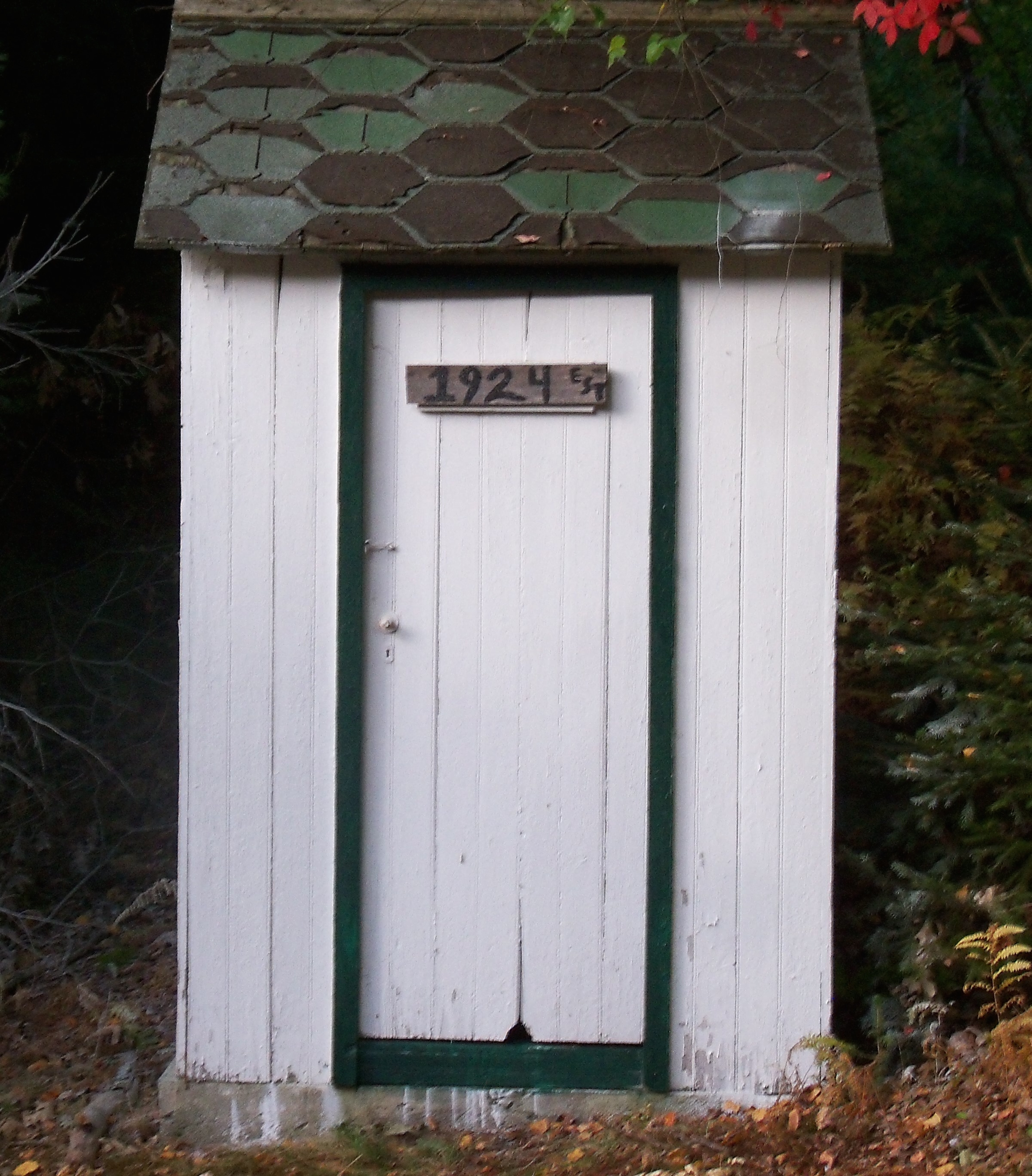
Outbuilding at the town hall

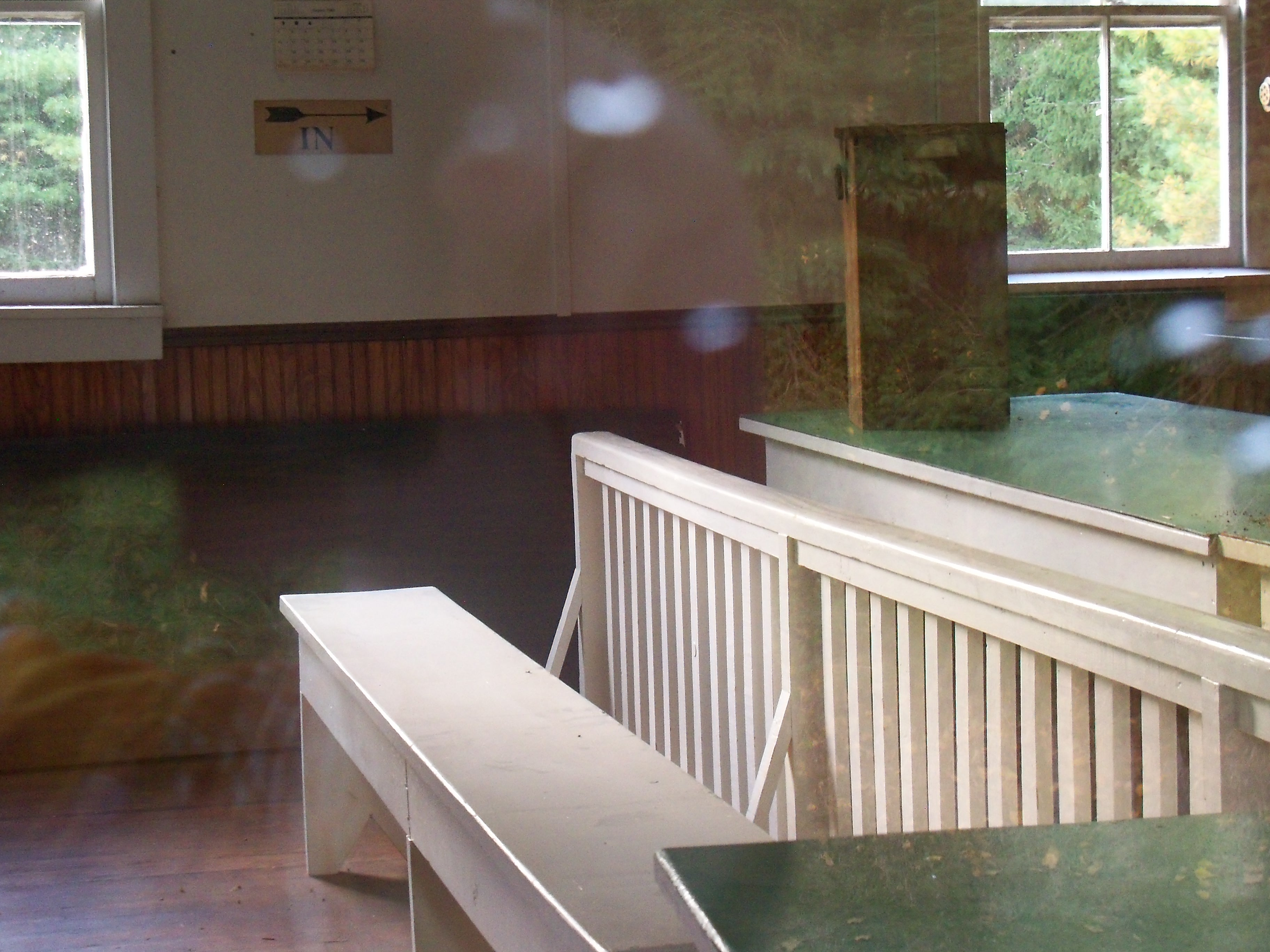
Inside the town hall
