= Sussex, New Jersey =

Borough in Sussex County, New Jersey, US

- Borough
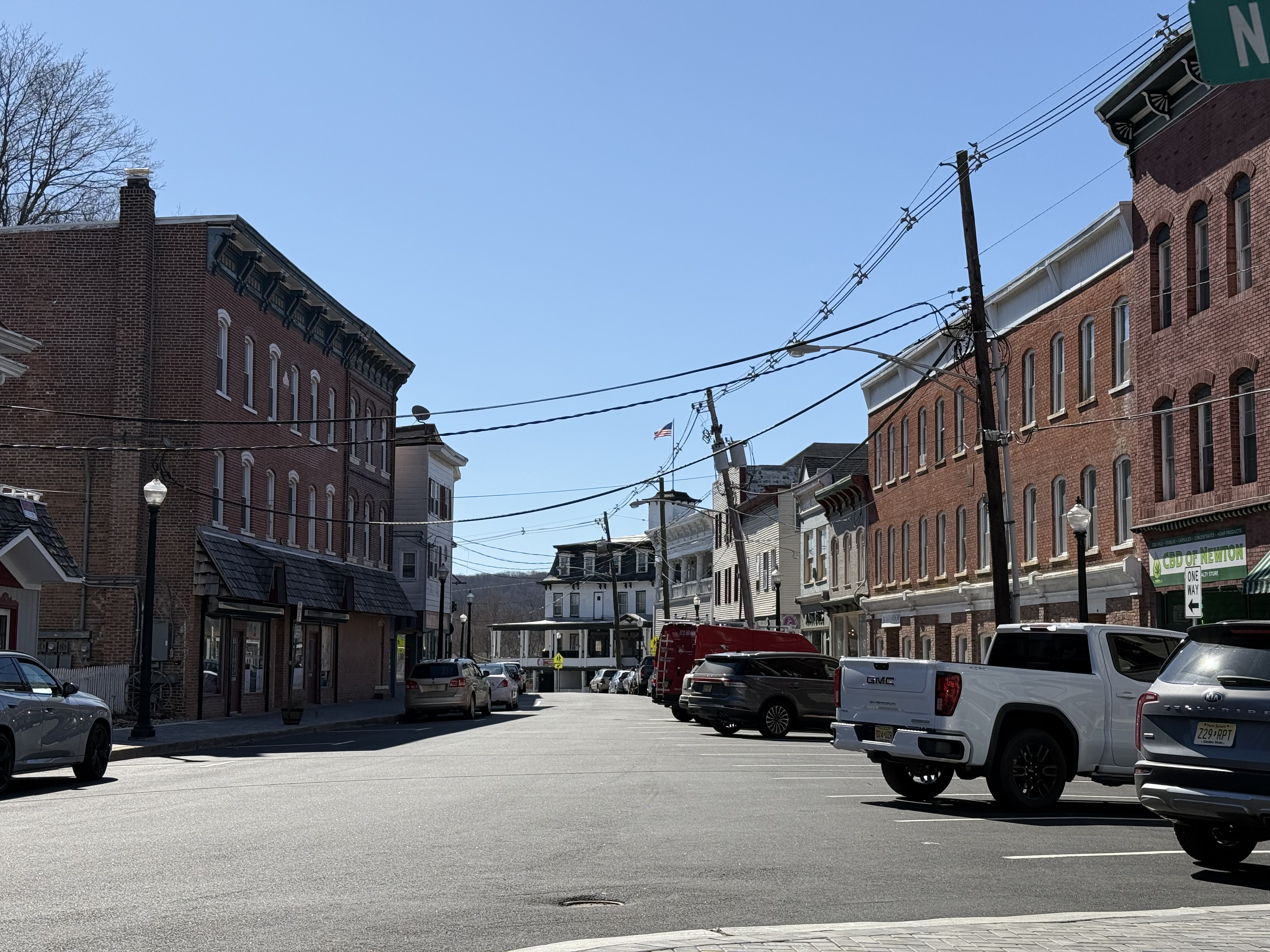
- View south along Main Street in central Sussex

- Seal

- Map of Sussex County highlighting Sussex Borough. Inset: Location of Sussex County in the State of New Jersey.

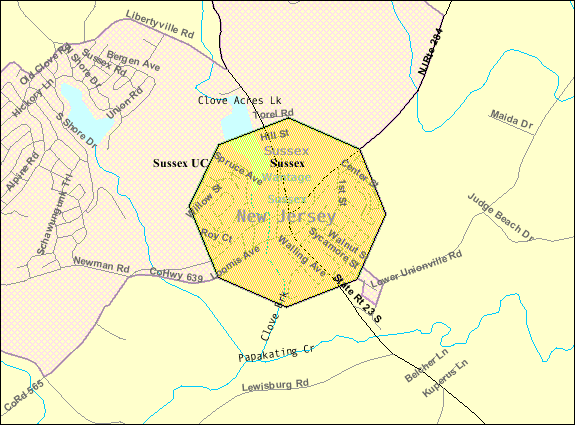
- Census Bureau map of Sussex, New Jersey

- Location in Sussex County Location in New Jersey Location in the United States
- Coordinates: 41.208771°N 74.608241°W
- Country: United States
- State: New Jersey
- County: Sussex
- Incorporated: October 14, 1891 as Deckertown
- Renamed: March 2, 1902 as Sussex
- Named for: Sussex, England

Government
  - Type: Borough
  - Body: Borough Council
  - Mayor: Robert Holowach (R, term ends December 31, 2027)
  - Administrator: Antoinette Smith
  - Municipal clerk: Antoinette Smith

Area
  - Total: 0.63 sq mi (1.62 km^{2})
  - Land: 0.59 sq mi (1.54 km^{2})
  - Water: 0.031 sq mi (0.08 km^{2}) 5.00%
  - Rank: 536th of 565 in state 23rd of 24 in county
- Elevation: 449 ft (137 m)

Population (2020)
  - Total: 2,024
  - Estimate (2023): 2,050
  - Rank: 484th of 565 in state 20th of 24 in county
  - Density: 3,412.8/sq mi (1,317.7/km^{2})
  - Rank: 198th of 565 in state 1st of 24 in county
- Time zone: UTC−05:00 (Eastern (EST))
  - Summer (DST): UTC−04:00 (Eastern (EDT))
- ZIP Code: 07461
- Area code: 973 exchanges: 702, 875
- FIPS code: 3403771670
- GNIS feature ID: 0885414
- Website: www.sussexboro.com

Sussex is a borough in Sussex County, in the U.S. state of New Jersey. As of the 2020 United States census, the borough's population was 2,024, a decrease of 106 (−5.0%) from the 2010 census count of 2,130, which in turn reflected a decline of 15 (−0.7%) from the 2,145 counted in the 2000 census.

The county and borough are named for the historic county of Sussex in England.

== History ==
Sussex was incorporated as a borough by an act of the New Jersey Legislature on October 14, 1891, as Deckertown, from portions of Wantage Township. The borough's original name was for settler Peter Decker. The borough was renamed Sussex on March 2, 1902.

A joint commission of residents of both Sussex and Wantage had recommended that the two communities should be consolidated to form what would be called the Township of Sussex-Wantage, which would operate within the Faulkner Act under the council-manager form of government, with a mayor and a six-member township council, and that voters in both municipalities should approve a referendum to be held on November 3, 2009. The committee noted that the two municipalities share common issues, schools, library and community services and that the artificial nature of the octagonal Sussex border often made it hard to distinguish between the two. The efforts at consolidation with surrounding Wantage Township ended in November 2009 after Wantage voters rejected the merger despite support from Sussex borough residents.

== Geography ==
According to the U.S. Census Bureau, Sussex borough had a total area of 0.62 square miles (1.62 km^{2}), including 0.59 square miles (1.54 km^{2}) of land and 0.03 square miles (0.08 km^{2}) of water (5.00%). It is approximately 400 to 450 feet (120 to 140 m) above sea level. The borough is completely surrounded by Wantage Township, making it part of 21 pairs of "doughnut towns" in the state, where one municipality entirely surrounds another.

The borough is in the watershed of the Wallkill River (which flows north, and empties into the Rondout Creek, which flows into the Hudson River near Kingston, New York) and its tributary Glen Brook, which near Sussex forms a small body of water called Clove Lake, part of which is within the borough.

=== Climate ===
Due to its inland location and elevation, Sussex has a climate much cooler than most of the state, classified as humid continental (Köppen Dfa, closely bordering on Dfb), with cold, moderately snowy winters, and very warm, humid summers. It is part of USDA Plant Hardiness Zone 6. The monthly daily average temperature ranges from 25.8 °F (−3.4 °C) in January to 71.8 °F (22.1 °C) in July. Temperatures reach 90 °F (32 °C) on 13.4 days and fall to 0 °F (−18 °C) on 5.2 nights annually. Snowfall averages 38.7 inches (98 cm) per season, although this usually varies widely from year to year. Extremes in the temperature range from −29 °F (−34 °C) on January 21, 1994 up to 106 °F (41 °C) on July 10, 1936.

Climate data for Sussex 3 WNW, New Jersey (1991–2020 normals, extremes 1893–present)
Month	Jan	Feb	Mar	Apr	May	Jun	Jul	Aug	Sep	Oct	Nov	Dec	Year
Record high °F (°C)	71 (22)	77 (25)	90 (32)	95 (35)	97 (36)	98 (37)	106 (41)	102 (39)	102 (39)	92 (33)	84 (29)	75 (24)	106 (41)
Mean daily maximum °F (°C)	34.9 (1.6)	38.0 (3.3)	47.0 (8.3)	59.7 (15.4)	70.5 (21.4)	78.4 (25.8)	83.2 (28.4)	81.5 (27.5)	74.3 (23.5)	62.9 (17.2)	50.9 (10.5)	39.7 (4.3)	60.1 (15.6)
Daily mean °F (°C)	25.8 (−3.4)	27.9 (−2.3)	36.2 (2.3)	47.7 (8.7)	58.2 (14.6)	66.7 (19.3)	71.8 (22.1)	70.0 (21.1)	62.6 (17.0)	51.3 (10.7)	40.9 (4.9)	31.1 (−0.5)	49.2 (9.6)
Mean daily minimum °F (°C)	16.7 (−8.5)	17.9 (−7.8)	25.4 (−3.7)	35.8 (2.1)	45.8 (7.7)	55.1 (12.8)	60.4 (15.8)	58.5 (14.7)	50.9 (10.5)	39.7 (4.3)	30.9 (−0.6)	22.6 (−5.2)	38.3 (3.5)
Record low °F (°C)	−29 (−34)	−23 (−31)	−10 (−23)	9 (−13)	24 (−4)	33 (1)	40 (4)	34 (1)	27 (−3)	7 (−14)	5 (−15)	−13 (−25)	−29 (−34)
Average precipitation inches (mm)	3.50 (89)	2.72 (69)	3.63 (92)	4.18 (106)	3.87 (98)	5.20 (132)	4.36 (111)	4.50 (114)	4.96 (126)	4.66 (118)	3.17 (81)	3.98 (101)	48.73 (1,238)
Average snowfall inches (cm)	11.6 (29)	9.9 (25)	6.3 (16)	1.2 (3.0)	0.0 (0.0)	0.0 (0.0)	0.0 (0.0)	0.0 (0.0)	0.0 (0.0)	0.3 (0.76)	1.4 (3.6)	8.0 (20)	38.7 (98)
Average precipitation days (≥ 0.01 in)	10.8	9.1	11.3	12.1	13.2	10.7	11.9	11.8	9.9	10.9	9.2	11.0	131.9
Average snowy days (≥ 0.1 in)	5.2	4.8	2.8	0.3	0.0	0.0	0.0	0.0	0.0	0.1	0.6	3.4	17.2
Source: NOAA

== Demographics ==
Historical population
Census	Pop.	Note	%±
1880	370		—
1890	993		168.4%
1900	1,306		31.5%
1910	1,212		−7.2%
1920	1,318		8.7%
1930	1,415		7.4%
1940	1,478		4.5%
1950	1,541		4.3%
1960	1,656		7.5%
1970	2,038		23.1%
1980	2,418		18.6%
1990	2,201		−9.0%
2000	2,145		−2.5%
2010	2,130		−0.7%
2020	2,024		−5.0%
2023 (est.)	2,050	▲	1.3%
Population sources: 1880–1890 1890–1920; 1890–1910 1910–1930; 1940–2000 2000; 2010 2020

=== 2020 census ===
As of the 2020 census, Sussex had a population of 2,024. The median age was 42.3 years. 19.1% of residents were under the age of 18 and 16.1% of residents were 65 years of age or older. For every 100 females there were 93.1 males, and for every 100 females age 18 and over there were 90.3 males age 18 and over.

0.0% of residents lived in urban areas, while 100.0% lived in rural areas.

There were 901 households in Sussex, of which 26.2% had children under the age of 18 living in them. Of all households, 33.6% were married-couple households, 24.5% were households with a male householder and no spouse or partner present, and 33.1% were households with a female householder and no spouse or partner present. About 37.8% of all households were made up of individuals and 12.8% had someone living alone who was 65 years of age or older.

There were 1,013 housing units, of which 11.1% were vacant. The homeowner vacancy rate was 2.6% and the rental vacancy rate was 9.8%.

Racial composition as of the 2020 census
Race	Number	Percent
White	1,648	81.4%
Black or African American	60	3.0%
American Indian and Alaska Native	9	0.4%
Asian	30	1.5%
Native Hawaiian and Other Pacific Islander	0	0.0%
Some other race	96	4.7%
Two or more races	181	8.9%
Hispanic or Latino (of any race)	284	14.0%

=== 2010 census ===
The 2010 United States census counted 2,130 people, 899 households, and 525 families in the borough. The population density was 3,615.9 per square mile (1,396.1/km^{2}). There were 1,005 housing units at an average density of 1,706.1 per square mile (658.7/km^{2}). The racial makeup was 91.03% (1,939) White, 1.92% (41) Black or African American, 0.33% (7) Native American, 2.30% (49) Asian, 0.42% (9) Pacific Islander, 1.36% (29) from other races, and 2.63% (56) from two or more races. Hispanic or Latino of any race were 7.93% (169) of the population.

Of the 899 households, 26.8% had children under the age of 18; 36.8% were married couples living together; 15.5% had a female householder with no husband present and 41.6% were non-families. Of all households, 36.9% were made up of individuals and 12.8% had someone living alone who was 65 years of age or older. The average household size was 2.32 and the average family size was 3.04.

22.8% of the population were under the age of 18, 9.6% from 18 to 24, 27.3% from 25 to 44, 28.1% from 45 to 64, and 12.3% who were 65 years of age or older. The median age was 38.7 years. For every 100 females, the population had 100.9 males. For every 100 females ages 18 and older there were 98.2 males.

The Census Bureau's 2006–2010 American Community Survey showed that (in 2010 inflation-adjusted dollars) median household income was $40,978 (with a margin of error of +/− $13,975) and the median family income was $53,125 (+/− $10,034). Males had a median income of $40,234 (+/− $9,777) versus $30,777 (+/− $3,942) for females. The per capita income for the borough was $20,887 (+/− $2,314). About 13.0% of families and 15.1% of the population were below the poverty line, including 22.4% of those under age 18 and 12.0% of those age 65 or over.

=== 2000 census ===
As of the 2000 United States census there were 2,145 people, 903 households, and 512 families residing in the borough. The population density was 3,598 inhabitants per square mile (1,389/km^{2}). There were 961 housing units at an average density of 1,612 per square mile (622/km^{2}). The racial makeup of the borough was 96.32% White, 1.12% African American, 0.09% Native American, 1.21% Asian, 0.37% from other races, and 0.89% from two or more races. Hispanic or Latino of any race were 2.56% of the population.

There were 903 households, out of which 28.3% had children under the age of 18 living with them, 38.9% were married couples living together, 12.6% had a female householder with no husband present, and 43.2% were non-families. 35.1% of all households were made up of individuals, and 12.6% had someone living alone who was 65 years of age or older. The average household size was 2.36 and the average family size was 3.12.

In the borough the population was spread out, with 23.9% under the age of 18, 8.5% from 18 to 24, 32.9% from 25 to 44, 22.0% from 45 to 64, and 12.7% who were 65 years of age or older. The median age was 36 years. For every 100 females, there were 91.5 males. For every 100 females age 18 and over, there were 91.8 males.

The median income for a household in the borough was $36,172, and the median income for a family was $45,250. Males had a median income of $37,009 versus $22,475 for females. The per capita income for the borough was $18,866. About 6.9% of families and 11.0% of the population were below the poverty line, including 15.6% of those under age 18 and 8.4% of those age 65 or over.

== Government ==
=== Local government ===
Sussex is governed under the borough form of New Jersey municipal government, which is used in 218 municipalities (of the 564) statewide, making it the most common form of government in New Jersey. The governing body is comprised of the mayor and the borough council, with all positions elected at-large on a partisan basis as part of the November general election. The mayor is elected directly by the voters to a four-year term of office. The borough council includes six members elected to serve three-year terms on a staggered basis, with two seats coming up for election each year in a three-year cycle. The borough form of government used by Sussex is a "weak mayor / strong council" government in which council members act as the legislative body with the mayor presiding at meetings and voting only in the event of a tie. The mayor can veto ordinances subject to an override by a two-thirds majority vote of the council. The mayor makes committee and liaison assignments for council members, and most appointments are made by the mayor with the advice and consent of the council.

As of 2024, the mayor of Sussex Borough is Republican Robert Holowach, whose term of office ends on December 31, 2027. Members of the Borough Council are Council President Mario Poggi (R, 2025), Charles H. Fronheiser Jr. (R, 2024), Martin Kokoruda (R, 2026), Jake Little (R, 2024), John Ross (R, 2025) and Nicholas Southard (R, 2026).

After the borough council did not vote to select any of the three candidates nominated by the Republican municipal committee, Nicholas R. Holowach was picked by the Republican group and sworn into office in June 2021 to fill the seat expiring in December 2022 that had been held by Walter Cleary III until he resigned from office to move out of the borough. In November 2021, Holowach was elected to serve the balance of the term of office.

In January 2020, the borough council selected Linda Masson from a list of three candidates nominated by the Republican municipal committee to fill the seat expiring in December 2021 that was vacated by Edward Meyer when he took office as mayor.

In January 2016, the council appointed Albert Decker from a list three candidates nominated by the Democratic municipal committee to fill the council seat vacated by Katherine Little expiring in December 2017 that became open when she took office as mayor; Decker served on an interim basis until the November 2016 general election, when voters selected a candidate to serve the one year remaining on the term of office.

In January 2015, the borough council selected Mario Poggi from three candidates nominated by the Republican municipal committee to fill the vacant seat of Bruce D. LaBar, who resigned from office earlier that month. In the November 2015 general election, Frank Dykstra was chosen to fill the balance of the seat expiring in December 2016.

=== Federal, state and county representation ===
Sussex Borough is located in the 5th Congressional District and is part of New Jersey's 24th state legislative district.

For the 119th United States Congress, New Jersey's 5th congressional district is represented by Josh Gottheimer (D, Wyckoff). New Jersey is represented in the United States Senate by Democrats Cory Booker (Newark, term ends 2027) and Andy Kim (Moorestown, term ends 2031).

For the 2026–2027 session, the 24th legislative district of the New Jersey Legislature is represented in the State Senate by Parker Space (R, Wantage Township) and in the General Assembly by Dawn Fantasia (R, Franklin) and Mike Inganamort (R, Chester Township).

Sussex County is governed by a Board of County Commissioners whose five members are elected at-large in partisan elections on a staggered basis, with either one or two seats coming up for election each year. At an annual reorganization meeting held in the beginning of January, the board selects a Commissioner Director and Deputy Director from among its members, with day-to-day supervision of the operation of the county delegated to a County Administrator. As of 2025, Sussex County's Commissioners are Director Jill Space (R, Wantage Township, 2025), Deputy Director Chris Carney (R, Frankford Township, 2027), Jack DeGroot (R, Sussex, 2026), William Hayden (I, Branchville, 2025) and Alan Henderson (R, Lafayette Township, 2027).

Constitutional officers elected on a countywide basis are Clerk Jeffrey M. Parrott (R, Wantage Township, 2026), Sheriff Michael F. Strada (R, Hampton Township, 2025) and Surrogate Gary R. Chiusano (R, Frankford Township, 2028).

=== Politics ===
As of March 2011, there were a total of 1,143 registered voters in Sussex, of which 193 (16.9% vs. 16.5% countywide) were registered as Democrats, 428 (37.4% vs. 39.3%) were registered as Republicans and 521 (45.6% vs. 44.1%) were registered as Unaffiliated. There was one voter registered to another party. Among the borough's 2010 Census population, 53.7% (vs. 65.8% in Sussex County) were registered to vote, including 69.5% of those ages 18 and over (vs. 86.5% countywide).

Gubernatorial election results for Sussex
Year	Republican		Democratic		Third party(ies)	
Year	No.	%	No.	%	No.	%
2025	387	58.20%	272	40.90%	6	0.90%
2021	359	66.85%	166	30.91%	12	2.23%
2017	220	58.67%	130	34.67%	25	6.67%
2013	276	70.77%	99	25.38%	15	3.85%
2009	291	57.51%	140	27.67%	75	14.82%
2005	241	50.95%	205	43.34%	27	5.71%

In the 2012 presidential election, Republican Mitt Romney received 391 votes (57.8% vs. 59.4% countywide), ahead of Democrat Barack Obama with 270 votes (39.9% vs. 38.2%) and other candidates with 16 votes (2.4% vs. 2.1%), among the 677 ballots cast by the borough's 1,146 registered voters, for a turnout of 59.1% (vs. 68.3% in Sussex County). In the 2008 presidential election, Republican John McCain received 427 votes (57.1% vs. 59.2% countywide), ahead of Democrat Barack Obama with 299 votes (40.0% vs. 38.7%) and other candidates with 18 votes (2.4% vs. 1.5%), among the 748 ballots cast by the borough's 1,109 registered voters, for a turnout of 67.4% (vs. 76.9% in Sussex County). In the 2004 presidential election, Republican George W. Bush received 456 votes (62.0% vs. 63.9% countywide), ahead of Democrat John Kerry with 263 votes (35.7% vs. 34.4%) and other candidates with 16 votes (2.2% vs. 1.3%), among the 736 ballots cast by the borough's 1,091 registered voters, for a turnout of 67.5% (vs. 77.7% in the whole county).

United States presidential election results for Sussex 2024 2020 2016 2012 2008 2004
Year	Republican		Democratic		Third party(ies)	
Year	No.	%	No.	%	No.	%
2024	608	65.10%	309	33.08%	17	1.82%
2020	553	59.85%	341	36.90%	30	3.25%
2016	497	66.18%	207	27.56%	47	6.26%
2012	391	57.75%	270	39.88%	16	2.36%
2008	427	57.39%	299	40.19%	18	2.42%
2004	456	62.04%	263	35.78%	16	2.18%

In the 2013 gubernatorial election, Republican Chris Christie received 70.8% of the vote (276 cast), ahead of Democrat Barbara Buono with 25.4% (99 votes), and other candidates with 3.8% (15 votes), among the 397 ballots cast by the borough's 1,148 registered voters (7 ballots were spoiled), for a turnout of 34.6%. In the 2009 gubernatorial election, Republican Chris Christie received 291 votes (56.8% vs. 63.3% countywide), ahead of Democrat Jon Corzine with 140 votes (27.3% vs. 25.7%), Independent Chris Daggett with 59 votes (11.5% vs. 9.1%) and other candidates with 16 votes (3.1% vs. 1.3%), among the 512 ballots cast by the borough's 1,109 registered voters, yielding a 46.2% turnout (vs. 52.3% in the county).

United States Senate election results for Sussex1
Year	Republican		Democratic		Third party(ies)	
Year	No.	%	No.	%	No.	%
2024	558	61.93%	301	33.41%	42	4.66%
2018	354	62.88%	174	30.91%	35	6.22%
2012	371	56.38%	250	37.99%	37	5.62%
2006	270	59.08%	163	35.67%	24	5.25%

United States Senate election results for Sussex2
Year	Republican		Democratic		Third party(ies)	
Year	No.	%	No.	%	No.	%
2020	504	55.57%	352	38.81%	51	5.62%
2014	245	55.94%	176	40.18%	17	3.88%
2013	156	70.59%	64	28.96%	1	0.45%
2008	382	52.69%	303	41.79%	40	5.52%

== Education ==
Students in public school for pre-kindergarten through eighth grade attend the Sussex-Wantage Regional School District, together with students from Wantage Township. As of the 2024–25 school year, the district, comprised of three schools, had an enrollment of 1,159 students and 112.5 classroom teachers (on an FTE basis), for a student–teacher ratio of 10.3:1. Schools in the district (with 2024–25 enrollment data from the National Center for Education Statistics) are Clifton E. Lawrence School in Wantage, with 426 students in grades PreK–2, Wantage Elementary School in Wantage, with 396 students in grades 3–5 and Sussex Middle School in Sussex, with 291 students in grades 6–8. Seats on the regional district's nine-member board of education are allocated based on the population of the constituent municipalities, with one seat assigned to Sussex.

For ninth through twelfth grades, public school students from both Sussex and Wantage attend High Point Regional High School, together with students from Branchville, Frankford Township, Lafayette Township and Montague Township. As of the 2024–25 school year, the high school had an enrollment of 791 students and 67.6 classroom teachers (on an FTE basis), for a student–teacher ratio of 11.7:1. Seats on the high school district's nine-member board of education are allocated based on the population of the constituent municipalities, with one seat assigned to Sussex.

Sussex Christian School is an inter-denominational Christian private day school that was founded in 1958 by members of the Sussex Christian Reformed Church, and which serves students from Northern New Jersey and the surrounding communities in New York and Pennsylvania.

== Transportation ==
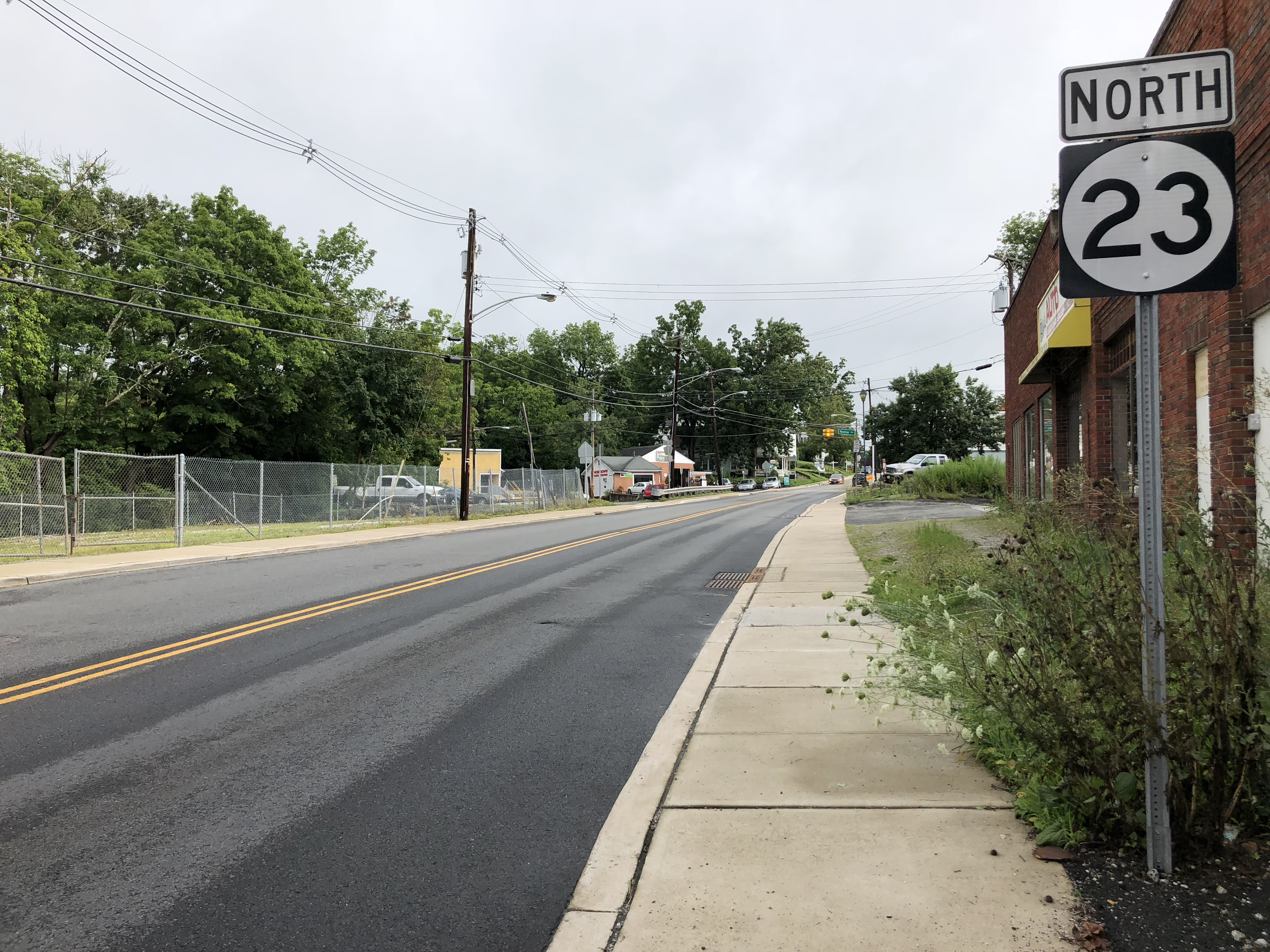
Route 23 northbound in Sussex

=== Roads and highways ===
As of May 2010, the borough had a total of 9.21 miles (14.82 km) of roadways, of which 6.67 miles (10.73 km) were maintained by the municipality, 0.87 miles (1.40 km) by Sussex County and 1.67 miles (2.69 km) by the New Jersey Department of Transportation.

Sussex is located at the intersection of Route 23 and Route 284.

=== Public transportation ===
Local bus service is provided by the Skylands Connect bus, which provides service to Hamburg, Sparta and Newton.

Sussex Airport is located 1 mile (1.6 km) southwest of Sussex.

== Notable people ==
People who were born in, residents of, or otherwise closely associated with Sussex include:

- Grant Decker (1814–1890), first mayor of Flint, Michigan
- Paul W. Downs (born 1982), actor, writer, and director best known for his portrayal of Trey Pucker on the Comedy Central series Broad City
- D. C. Fontana (1939–2019), television script writer and story editor, best known for her work on the original Star Trek franchise and several western television series
- Bill Glynn (1925–2013), Major League Baseball first baseman who played four seasons of professional baseball for the Cleveland Indians and the Philadelphia Phillies
- William Alexander Linn (1846–1917), journalist and historian
- Homer Mensch (1914–2005), classical bassist
