= High Point Regional High School =

High school in Sussex County, New Jersey, US

Address
- 299 Pidgeon Hill Road Wantage Township, Sussex County, New Jersey, 07461; United States
- Coordinates: 41.196874°N 74.647871°W

District information
- Grades: 9-12
- Superintendent: Scott D. Ripley
- Business administrator: Kathy Kolbusch
- Schools: 1

Students and staff
- Enrollment: 815 (as of 2024–25)
- Faculty: 67.6 FTEs
- Student–teacher ratio: 12.1:1

Other information
- District Factor Group: DE
- Website: www.hpregional.org
| Ind. | Per pupil | District spending | Rank (*) | 9-12 average | %± vs. average |
|---|---|---|---|---|---|
| 1A | Total Spending | $25,679 | 42 | $18,891 | 35.9% |
| 1 | Budgetary Cost | 19,684 | 46 | 15,592 | 26.2% |
| 2 | Classroom Instruction | 11,195 | 47 | 8,807 | 27.1% |
| 6 | Support Services | 2,608 | 33 | 2,294 | 13.7% |
| 8 | Administrative Cost | 1,968 | 44 | 1,592 | 23.6% |
| 10 | Operations & Maintenance | 2,502 | 46 | 1,954 | 28.0% |
| 13 | Extracurricular Activities | 1,142 | 41 | 873 | 30.8% |
| 16 | Median Teacher Salary | 83,024 | 43 | 71,726 |
Data from NJDoE 2014 Taxpayers' Guide to Education Spending. *Of 9-12 districts with any number of students. Lowest spending=1; Highest=47

High Point Regional High School

Information
- Type: Regional public high school
- Established: September 1966
- NCES School ID: 340714005358
- Principal: Jon Tallamy
- Faculty: 67.6 FTEs
- Grades: 9-12
- Enrollment: 791 (as of 2024–25)
- Student to teacher ratio: 11.7:1
- Colors: Scarlet and silver
- Athletics conference: Northwest Jersey Athletic Conference (general); North Jersey Super Football Conference (football)
- Team name: Wildcats
- Publication: Calliope (literary and arts magazine)
- Yearbook: Obelisk

High Point Regional High School is a comprehensive four-year public high school located in Wantage Township, in the U.S. state of New Jersey, which is the sole high school in its school district. The school has a Sussex mailing address.

The district educates students in ninth through twelfth grades from the constituent municipalities in Sussex County of Branchville, Frankford Township, Lafayette Township, Sussex and Wantage Township, with students from Montague Township attending as part of a sending/receiving relationship. The high school was established in 1963 and is located in Wantage Township. The school is accredited by the New Jersey Department of Education.

As of the 2024–25 school year, the school had an enrollment of 791 students and 67.6 classroom teachers (on an FTE basis), for a student–teacher ratio of 11.7:1. There were 160 students (20.2% of enrollment) eligible for free lunch and 31 (3.9% of students) eligible for reduced-cost lunch.

The district participates in the Interdistrict Public School Choice Program, which allows non-resident students to attend school in the district at no cost to their parents, with tuition covered by the resident district. Available slots are announced annually by grade.

== History ==
Prior to the establishment of the regional high school, students from Branchville, Frankford Township and Lafayette Township had attended Newton High School as part of sending/receiving relationships, while those from Sussex and Wantage Township had attended Sussex High School.

Created in 1963 as a district, the school opened in September 1966.

Starting in September 2014, high school students from Montague Township School District began attending High Point Regional High School, as part of a sending/receiving relationship under which incoming ninth graders began attending the High Point district while existing students attended Port Jervis High School in Port Jervis, New York, until they graduated.

The Montague district began seeking to annul the relationship with High Point Regional and resume sending students to Port Jervis. In February 2018 all seven members of the Montague board approved a symbolic resolution to not renew its ties with High Point. Eric Obernauer of the New Jersey Herald stated that the Montague-High Point relationship was "frosty" and "icy". The Montague district chose to switch back to Port Jervis because Port Jervis offered a lower tuition than High Point; High Point charged $16,368 per student to Montague. All six members of the Montague district voted, in October 2019, to switch back to Port Jervis. to switch back to Port Jervis. The High Point district sought to block this request on the grounds it and its students would be financially impacted. The Montague district stated that the districts signed an agreement in 2018 that would allow Montague to leave at will. By December 2020 the districts were in a legal dispute. The High Point agreement is scheduled to end in 2024.

By 2021, the new Montague board sought to dismiss lawsuits against High Point. Obernauer stated "dissatisfaction with how the Montague district is being run and legal fees spent trying to resume the longstanding relationship with Port Jervis, coupled with a growing acceptance of the High Point relationship, appear to have changed public sentiment."

In 2021, there were 82 students from Montague Township among the 889 enrolled at High Point High School.

The district had been classified by the New Jersey Department of Education as being in District Factor Group "DE", the fifth-highest of eight groupings. District Factor Groups organize districts statewide to allow comparison by common socioeconomic characteristics of the local districts. From lowest socioeconomic status to highest, the categories are A, B, CD, DE, FG, GH, I and J.

== Awards, recognition and rankings ==
For the 1997–98 school year, High Point Regional High School received the National Blue Ribbon Award from the United States Department of Education, the highest honor that an American school can achieve.

The school was the 142nd-ranked public high school in New Jersey out of 339 schools statewide in New Jersey Monthly magazine's September 2014 cover story on the state's "Top Public High Schools", using a new ranking methodology. The school had been ranked 88th in the state of 328 schools in 2012, after being ranked 125th in 2010 out of 322 schools listed. The magazine ranked the school 157th in 2008 out of 316 schools. The school was ranked 151st in the magazine's September 2006 issue, which surveyed 316 schools across the state. The school was recently ranked first of 53 schools in the state in the "DE" District Factor Group by The Star-Ledger and second in the DFG by New Jersey Monthly magazine.

Schooldigger.com ranked the school 124th out of 389 public high schools statewide in its 2012 rankings (an increase of 7 positions from the 2011 rank) which were based on the combined percentage of students classified as proficient or above proficient on the mathematics (88.6%) and language arts literacy (95.2%) components of the High School Proficiency Assessment (HSPA).

From the New Jersey Department of Education's "Violence, Vandalism, and Substance Abuse in the Schools" report for 2012–2013, Patch released a list of the "9 Most Violent School Districts in New Jersey", with High Point Regional High School ranking number 5, preceded by Camden County Vocational School. These numbers brought much surprise to both students and parents in the district, considering the school's strong efforts to combat bullying with the "Students Against Being Bullied" organization founded by one of High Point's own students.

== Curriculum and achievement ==
The graduating class of 2011 had SAT scores on par with state and national averages, including an average SAT Critical Reading score of 498 (compared to state and national averages of 495 and 501, respectively), an average Math score of 520 (compared to state and national averages of 514 and 516, respectively), and an average Writing score of 500 (compared to state and national averages of 497 and 492, respectively).

In the 2013–14 school year, High Point Regional High School ranked sixth in Sussex County out of nine other public high schools in SAT scores.

High Point Regional High School offers classes including music, theater, media, technology, art, graphic design, web design, computer applications, retail marketing, sales, engineering and architecture.

== Athletics ==
The High Point Wildcats compete in the Northwest Jersey Athletic Conference a high school athletic conference comprised of public and private schools in Morris, Sussex and Warren counties, which operates under the auspices of the New Jersey State Interscholastic Athletic Association (NJSIAA), the statewide organization for high school sports. Until the NJSIAA's 2009 realignment, the school had participated in the Sussex County Interscholastic League, which included public and private high schools located in Sussex County and northern Morris County. With 673 students in grades 10–12, the school was classified by the NJSIAA for the 2019–20 school year as Group II for most athletic competition purposes, which included schools with an enrollment of 486 to 758 students in that grade range. The football team competes in the American White division of the North Jersey Super Football Conference, which includes 112 schools competing in 20 divisions, making it the nation's biggest football-only high school sports league. The school was classified by the NJSIAA as Group II North for football for 2024–2026, which included schools with 484 to 683 students.

The school participates as the host school / lead agency for joint ice hockey, boys lacrosse and boys / girls swimming teams with Wallkill Valley Regional High School. These co-op programs operate under agreements scheduled to expire at the end of the 2023–24 school year.

The wrestling team won the North I Group III state sectional championship in 1986–1997, 2001–2003, 2005–2008, 2010 and 2011, and the North II Group II title in 2012-2014 and 2017–2020. The team won the Group III state title in 2008 and 2011, and the Group II title in 2013, 2014, 2017, 2018 and 2020. The wrestling team won the Group III state wrestling championship in 2008 against Sayreville War Memorial High School, marking the school's second team state championship overall in all sports and its first ever in wrestling. They had won the SCIL League numerous times, including the last year of its existence in 2009. In 2009, the wrestling team was ruled ineligible to participate in the NJSIAA state tournament, as 65% of its matches had been against teams from New Jersey schools, less than the required 70% threshold. High Point captured its first back-to-back Group II championship wins in 2013 and 2014. High Point found themselves down 21-6 after seven bouts in 2013 against Long Branch High School and won the title with a four-bout pinning spree before holding on to win by a 33-30 margin. The 2014 team defeated Hanover Park High School with four consecutive pins to win the Group II title, after trailing 33–10 with four bouts left in the match.

The field hockey team won the North I Group III state sectional title in 1988, 1996, 1997, 2000 and 2002; the team won the Group III state championship in 1988, defeating Red Bank Regional High School in the championship game. The team won the North I Group III sectional title in 2002 with a 4–0 shutout against West Morris Central High School in the tournament final.

The softball team won the Group III state championship in 2012 (defeating runner-up Kingsway Regional High School in the finals) and in Group II in 2014 (vs. Robbinsville High School) In 2012, the softball team defeated Kingsway Regional High School to win the Group III state championship by a score of 1–0 in 11 innings. The 2014 team finished with a record of 28-2 after winning the Group II title with a 2–1 win against Robbinsville in the championship game.

== Arts ==
High Point offers a variety of different classes that are involved in the arts, including but not limited to: Choral, Concert Choir, Concert Band, Piano Lab, and Theatre. Each class offers different levels, depending on how many years the student has been enrolled in that particular class. These classes present their findings of the course through concerts, which are open to the public twice a year, once in the Winter and again in the Spring. This department also offers extra curricular activities such as: Chambers Choir, Fall Dramas, Spring Musicals, and Marching Band. The Marching Band as well as the Chambers Choir has been known to compete in several different competitions.

== Student body ==
In February 2020, there were 891 students, with 84 being from Montague Township.

The report "Montague Township School District High School Route Evaluation" stated that 85 Montague Township students went to High Point Regional.

== Transportation ==
Due to safety concerns with the initial bus route from Montague to High Point High, a new 18.5 miles (29.8 km) bus route was proposed. Montague Township uses two school buses to send students from that township to High Point Regional.

== Academic achievement ==
In the 2011–2012 school year its graduation rate was 95%.

== Notable alumni ==
- Nick Boyle (born 1993, class of 2011), tight end for the Baltimore Ravens
- Members of the band Folly
- Parker Space (born 1968, class of 1987), politician and owner of Space Farms Zoo and Museum, who has served in the New Jersey General Assembly since March 2013, where he represents the 24th Legislative District
- David Zabriskie (born 1986), retired amateur wrestler and current wrestling coach

== Administration ==
Core members of the school's administration are:

- Scott D. Ripley, superintendent
- Kathy Kolbusch, business administrator and board secretary
- Jon Tallamy, principal

== Board of education ==
The district's board of education, comprised of nine members, sets policy and oversees the fiscal and educational operation of the district through its administration. As a Type II school district, the board's trustees are elected directly by voters to serve three-year terms of office on a staggered basis, with three seats up for election each year held (since 2012) as part of the November general election. The board appoints a superintendent to oversee the district's day-to-day operations and a business administrator to supervise the business functions of the district. Seats on the board are allocated based on the population of the constituent municipalities, with four seats assigned to Wantage Township, two to Frankford Township, and one each to Branchville, Lafayette Township and Sussex.
