= Sparrow Bush, New York =

- Hamlet and CDP
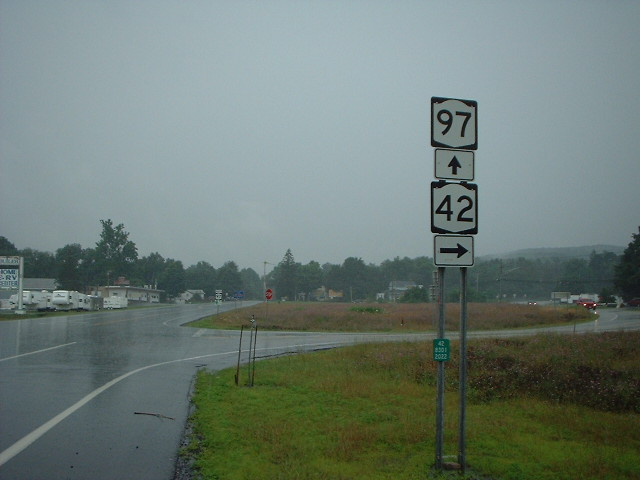
- An intersection where NY 42 and NY 97 split into two different roads, located in Sparrow Bush, New York

- Location within New York Location within the United States
- Coordinates: 41°24′00″N 74°43′24″W
- Country: United States
- State: New York
- County: Orange
- Town: Deerpark
- Named for: Henry L. Sparrow

Area
  - Total: 2.80 sq mi (7.25 km^{2})
  - Land: 2.7 sq mi (7 km^{2})
  - Water: 0.069 sq mi (0.18 km^{2})
- Elevation: 502 ft (153 m)

Population (2020)
  - Total: 981
  - Density: 360/sq mi (140/km^{2})
- Time zone: UTC-5 (Eastern (EST))
  - Summer (DST): UTC-4 (EDT)
- ZIP code: 12780
- Area code: 845
- GNIS feature ID: 965949

Sparrow Bush is a hamlet (and census designated place) in the town of Deerpark, in Orange County, New York, United States. The population as of the 2020 census is 981. The community is located along state routes 42 and 97, 2.3 miles (3.7 km) northwest of Port Jervis. Sparrow Bush has a post office with ZIP code 12780. The community is named after Henry L. Sparrow who owned a large piece of woodland near the D&H canal.The locals started to call this piece of land Sparrow's “Bosh” (meaning Sparrow's slope) and Sparrow's “Bosk” (meaning Sparrow's woods). Over time the name of the town gradually evolved into Sparrow bush.

It is zoned to Port Jervis School District, which operates Port Jervis High School and 2 Elementary Schools.

== Geography ==
Sparrow Bush is located at 41°24′00″N 74°43′24″W (41.2400, -74.4324)

According to the United States Census Bureau, the CDP has a total area of 2.8 sq mi (7.3 km^{2}), of which 2.72 sq mi (7.0 km^{2}) is land and 0.07 sq mi (0.18 km^{2})(2.5%) is water.

Interactive map of Sparrow Bush's location
