= Sussex Christian School (New Jersey) =

Coordinates: 41.212663°N 74.603764°W

Sussex Christian School is a private Christian school in Sussex, New Jersey, United States of America. It was founded in 1958 and is a pre-K through 8 grade educational facility. The school was founded in 1958 by members of the Sussex Christian Reformed Church and operates as an inter-demoninational Christian School.

As of the 2007-08 school year, the school had an enrollment of 170 students and 13.9 classroom teachers (on an FTE basis), for a student–teacher ratio of 12.2:1.
