= Forestburgh, New York =

- Town
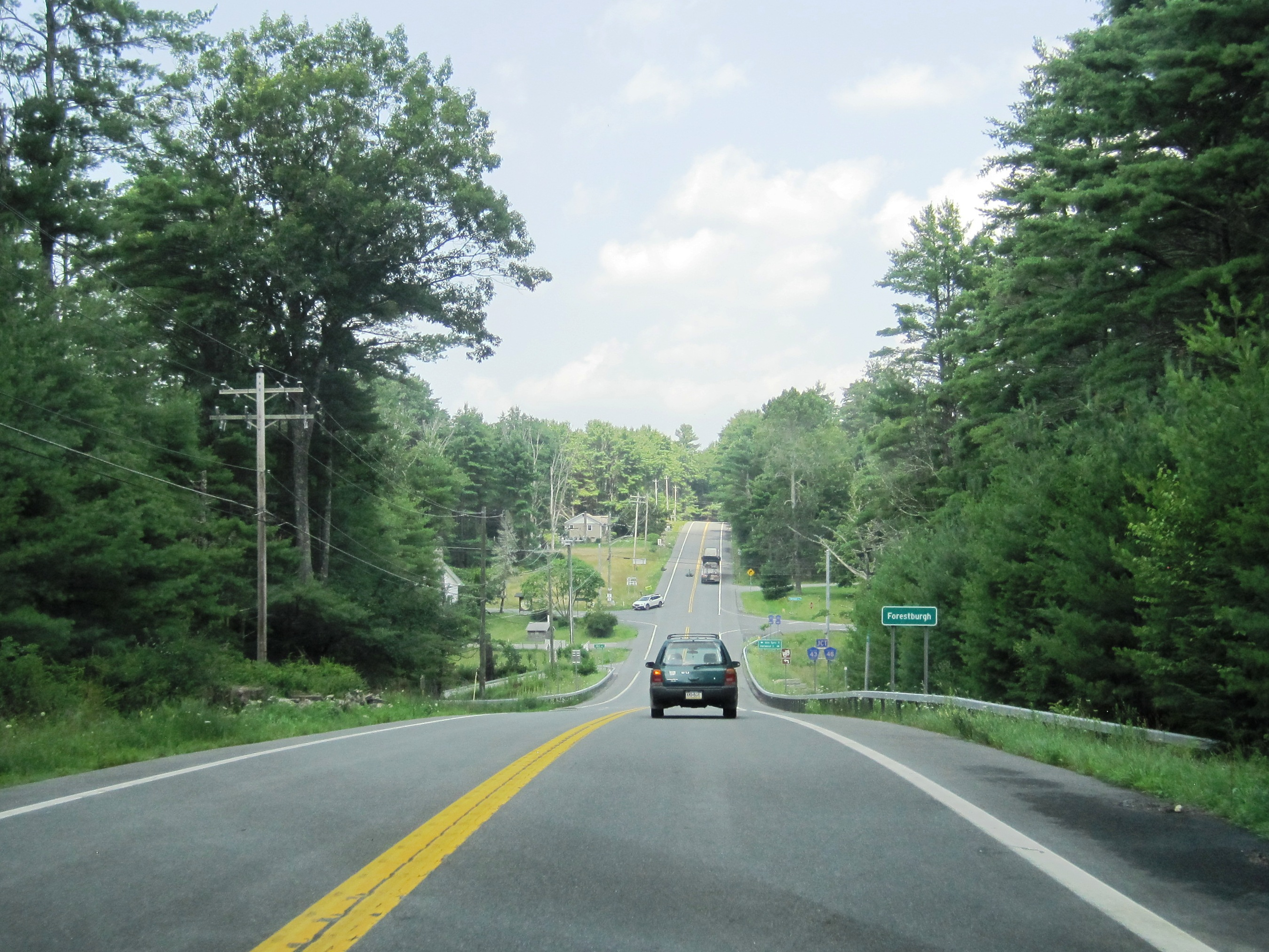
- Hamlet of Forestburgh within the town

- Location of Forestburgh in Sullivan County, New York
- Coordinates: 41°33′N 74°42′W
- Country: United States
- State: New York
- County: Sullivan

Area
  - Total: 56.31 sq mi (145.85 km^{2})
  - Land: 54.78 sq mi (141.88 km^{2})
  - Water: 1.53 sq mi (3.97 km^{2})
- Elevation: 1,417 ft (432 m)

Population (2020)
  - Total: 808
  - Density: 14.7/sq mi (5.69/km^{2})
- Time zone: UTC-5 (Eastern (EST))
  - Summer (DST): UTC-4 (EDT)
- ZIP code: 12777
- Area code: 845
- FIPS code: 36-26528
- GNIS feature ID: 0978963
- Website: www.forestburgh.net

Forestburgh is a town in Sullivan County, New York, United States. The population was 808 at the 2020 census. It is where the Neversink River enters the Neversink Gorge and flows over High Falls. The ZIP code of Forestburgh, New York is 12777.

The Town of Forestburgh is in the south-central part of the county.

== History ==
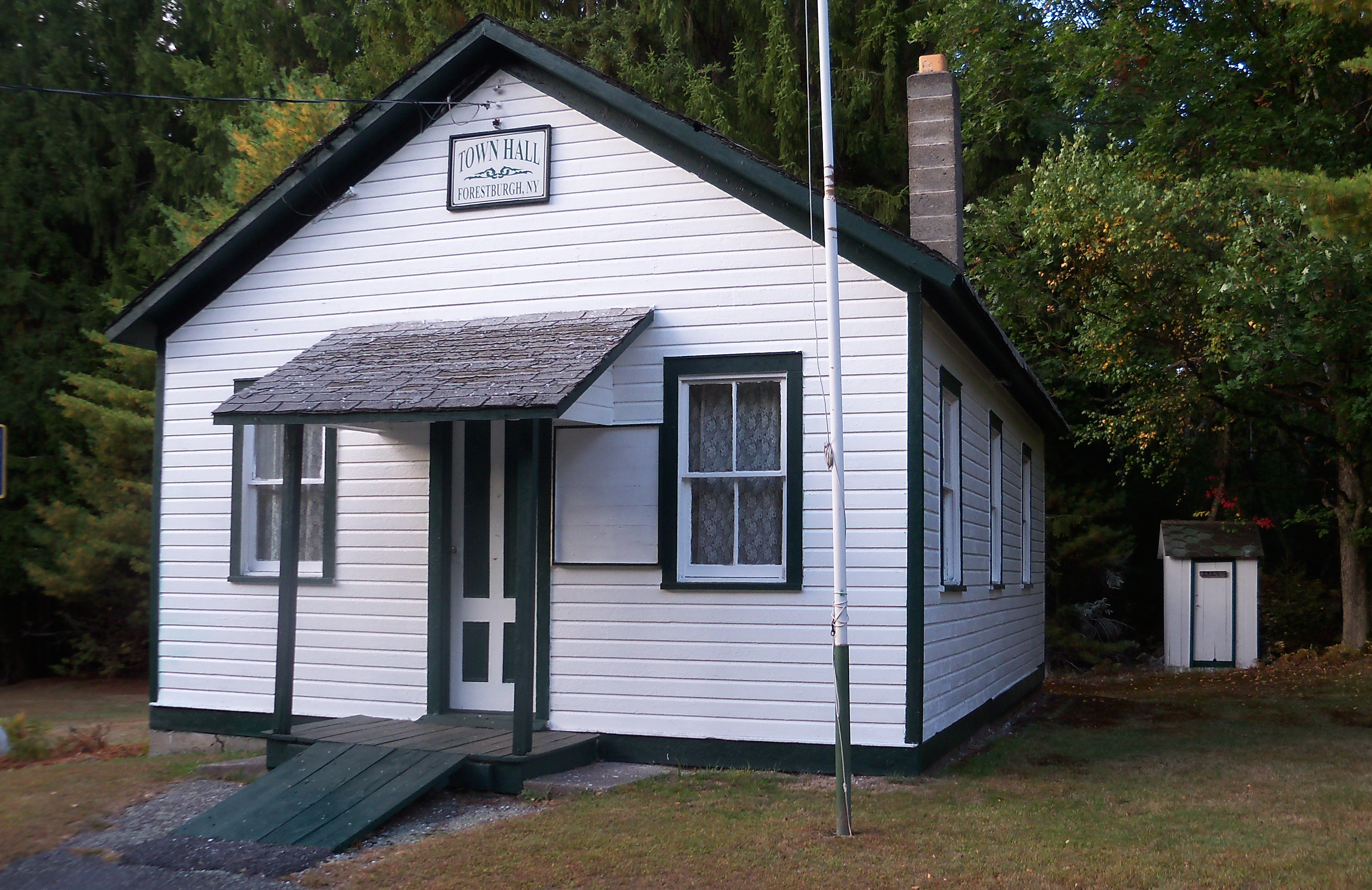
The historic Forestburgh Town Hall

The town was formed from parts of the Towns of Mamakating and Thompson in 1837.

Forestburgh's main industries in its early years were tanning, quarrying and lumbering. The mountains on either side of Bushkill Creek contained quarries of flagging, curbing and building stone (also known as bluestone). The largest of these was Paradise Quarry in Oakland Valley. Stone from this quarry was used to construct the Episcopal Church in Monticello. Many of the old sidewalks in New York City were said to have come from this area. The largest tannery was at Gilman's Station, which was later renamed St. Joseph's Station. According to French's Gazette, published in 1858, there were thirty-nine tanneries within the township, producing 100,000 sides of leather annually.

The opening of the Monticello and Port Jervis Railroad in the 1870s stimulated the lumbering, tanning and quarrying industries. The railroad entered Forestburgh at the Town's northern border and extended through it in a southerly direction along the Bushkill Creek Valley. In addition to assisting the Town's industrial base, the railroad also brought summer residents from New York City. The population of the Town in 1870 was 916, greater than the present day population of 808.

The quarrying industry began to decline in the late 1890s with the invention of concrete. The oak and hemlock bark used in tanning became scarce, signaling the end of the tanning industry. It was at this point, however, that the resort industry began to flourish in Forestburgh. Many homes in Oakland Valley began operating as boarding houses during the summer months when city residents came north on the train from New York. The Hartwood Club and Merriewold Park were born, and the Convent of St. Joseph's was established, along with summer camps for boys and girls and a Catholic boarding school.

By the mid-twentieth century the automobile caused the railroad to cease operation in Forestburgh. This substantially reduced the number of tourists who came to the town by train. Forestburgh slowly evolved into a rural-residential town, with many people commuting to jobs in nearby towns.

The Forestburgh Town Hall was added to the National Register of Historic Places in 2011.

== Geography ==
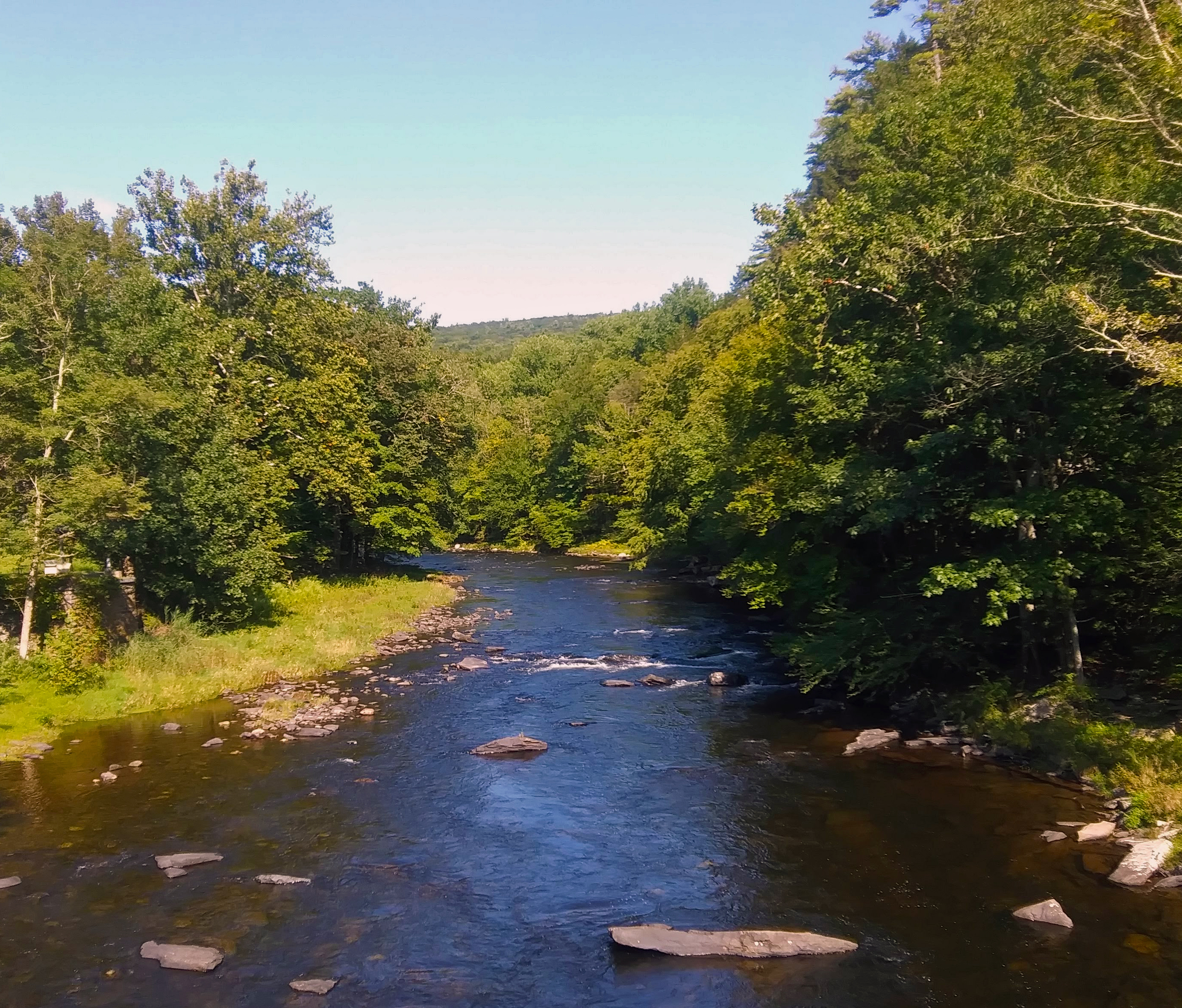
Neversink River in Forestburgh

Part of the southern town line is the border of Orange County.

According to the United States Census Bureau, the town has a total area of 56.8 square miles (147 km^{2}), of which 55.2 square miles (143 km^{2}) is land and 1.6 square miles (4.1 km^{2}) (2.83%) is water.

=== Climate ===
The Köppen Climate Classification subtype for this climate is "Dfb". (Warm Summer Continental Climate).

== Demographics ==
Historical population
Census	Pop.	Note	%±
1840	433		—
1850	715		65.1%
1860	911		27.4%
1870	915		0.4%
1880	1,058		15.6%
1890	714		−32.5%
1900	625		−12.5%
1910	545		−12.8%
1920	405		−25.7%
1930	415		2.5%
1940	389		−6.3%
1950	364		−6.4%
1960	356		−2.2%
1970	474		33.1%
1980	796		67.9%
1990	614		−22.9%
2000	831		35.3%
2010	819		−1.4%
2020	808		−1.3%
U.S. Decennial Census

As of the census of 2000, there were 833 people, 327 households, and 222 families residing in the town. The population density was 15.1 inhabitants per square mile (5.8/km^{2}). There were 500 housing units at an average density of 9.1 per square mile (3.5/km^{2}). The racial makeup of the town was 95.68% White, 2.04% African American, 1.68% from other races, and 0.60% from two or more races. Hispanic or Latino of any race were 4.80% of the population.

There were 327 households, out of which 28.1% had children under the age of 18 living with them, 57.2% were married couples living together, 6.7% had a female householder with no husband present, and 32.1% were non-families. 26.9% of all households were made up of individuals, and 12.2% had someone living alone who was 65 years of age or older. The average household size was 2.53 and the average family size was 3.03.

In the town, the population was spread out, with 22.1% under the age of 18, 5.2% from 18 to 24, 25.7% from 25 to 44, 31.1% from 45 to 64, and 16.0% who were 65 years of age or older. The median age was 43 years. For every 100 females, there were 91.5 males. For every 100 females age 18 and over, there were 97.3 males.

The median income for a household in the town was $56,125, and the median income for a family was $60,139. Males had a median income of $37,500 versus $35,347 for females. The per capita income for the town was $26,864. About 4.1% of families and 7.0% of the population were below the poverty line, including 4.0% of those under age 18 and 7.2% of those age 65 or over.

== Communities and locations in Forestburgh ==
=== Hamlets ===
- Forestburg – The hamlet of Forestburgh at Routes 42 and 48, east of Forestburgh Pond.
- Fowlerville – A hamlet northwest of Forestburgh village, located on route 44.
- Hartwood – A hamlet east of Forestburgh village on Route 48.
- Hartwood Club – A hamlet by the southern town line.
- Merriewold Park – A hamlet northeast of Forestburgh village.
- Philwold – German for "Phil's Woods" named by Philip Wechsler in 1939 to refer to the area around the five homes built by architect Eugene Schoen as a Usonian community for the Weschsler family in 1939.
- St. Josephs – A hamlet north of Forestburgh village by "St. Josephs Lake."
- Squirrels Corner – A hamlet north of Forestburgh on Route 45.

=== Other locations ===
==== Forestburg Scout Reservation ====
The Forestburg Scout Reservation lies completely within the town borders. Scouting America Monmouth Council owns and operates the camp. It is a year-round reservation featuring two distinct but connected camps: J. Fred Billett Camp and Dan Beard Camp. Burnt Hope Lake, Tecumseh Rock, and Darlington Falls are three of its most notable features.

==== Neversink River Unique Area ====
The State of New York owns an extensive amount of land in Forestburgh that is under the supervision of the New York State Department of Environmental Conservation. Foremost of this is the 4,881-acre (19.75 km^{2}) Neversink River Unique Area, sometimes called the Neversink Gorge.

The Neversink River has been recognized by The Nature Conservancy as one of “75 Last Great Places” based on its superior water quality and ability to support rare and pollution-sensitive species of mussels, which occur in the Neversink River approximately 6.5 miles (10.5 km) below the Unique Area. The portion of the Neversink River flowing through Forestburgh has long been recognized as having an excellent trout fishery.

==== Mongaup Valley Wildlife Management Area ====
New York State also owns a considerable amount of land that straddles the Mongaup River in the Town of Forestburgh and the neighboring Towns of Lumberland (Sullivan County) and Deerpark (Orange County), and owns conservation easements (from Orange and Rockland Utilities and Clove Development Corp.) for many more acres, thus prohibiting future development. Orange and Rockland Utilities, Inc. and/or its parent company Mirant Corp. own 764 acres (3.09 km^{2}) of land in Forestburgh along the Mongaup River.

There are public access opportunities for hunting, fishing, hiking, and boating. Eagle watching is extremely popular here in the winter, when bald eagles are numerous.

== Wildlife ==
Mammals found in the Town include whitetail deer, black bear, eastern gray squirrel, red squirrel, eastern cottontail, varying hare, common porcupine, gray fox, red fox, mink, otter, beaver, woodchuck, raccoon, skunk, muskrat, coyote and fisher.

The southern bald eagle is now an overwintering year-round inhabitant of the area, especially the Mongaup River, Rio Reservoir, and Mongaup Falls Reservoir, and many more bald eagles winter in the area. As a result of bald eagles becoming more prevalent, eagle watching has become a tourist attraction within the Town, drawing people from far distances, and the Town now uses the slogan “Winter Home of the Bald Eagle” on its road signs.

Approximately 200 species of birds have been identified in the area as part of a natural resource study for the Upper Delaware Scenic and Recreational River. Migratory species include woodcock, Canada geese, redhead duck, ring-necked duck, canvasback duck, greater scaup and lesser scaup. Other waterfowl that occasionally nest in the area are the American merganser, green-winged teal, black duck, mallard duck and wood duck. In addition, rails and snipe sometimes nest in the area. A variety of hawks, including the goshawk, redtailed hawk, redshouldered hawk, and sparrow hawk, as well as eastern wild turkey and turkey buzzard, are found in Forestburgh and the surrounding area. Several species of owls, including the barn owl, screech owl and great horned owl, are known to make their home in the Town. The occasional golden eagle, peregrine falcon, and osprey are seen in the Town.

Another important wildlife species found in Forestburgh is the eastern timber rattlesnake, which is classified by the DEC as a protected species and which is fully protected.

== Vegetation ==
Approximately ninety percent of Forestburgh's 35,000 acres (140 km^{2}) is forested land; this percentage is believed to be the highest in Sullivan County. West of Route 42 the land is a mixture of deciduous (hardwoods) and coniferous (evergreen) forest. The area north of Hartwood Road between Route 42 and the Bush Kill Road is about 75% deciduous cover with a sizable amount of brush and wetlands. The area south of Hartwood Road between Route 42 and the Bush Kill Road is predominantly coniferous and mixed forest. East of the Bush Kill Road the land is a mixture of brush, wooded wetland, deciduous and mixed forest. Here the banks of the Neversink River are clearly marked by a mixed forest of coniferous and deciduous trees. Many of the oak forests in the area have been replaced by birch forests.

== Recreational facilities ==
Recreational facilities and programs provided by The Town of Forestburgh include an outdoor swimming pool located at the Town Hall; the historic Forestburgh log cabin, one of the earliest structures built in Sullivan County; a skiing program for children in cooperation with Holiday Mountain Ski area; a children's summer arts and crafts program; and a senior citizen's program, which includes monthly meetings at the Town Hall and field trips.

The Forestburgh Playhouse has continued to offer its own unique version of summer theatre to audiences of Sullivan County. By the summer of 1997, the Playhouse celebrated its 50th birthday with a record breaking season, and at long last air-conditioning was installed in 2004.

== Historical and architectural resources ==
The historical and architectural resources of Forestburgh are rich and quite diverse in character. Among the most important are the Forestburgh log cabin, one of the earliest structures built in Sullivan County, the Blackbrook District School, the Stokes-Hartwell Mill Foundation, David H. Handy's Grave, the Railroad Station (Gilman's Depot), Sho-Foo-Den (an elegant Japanese wooden structure from the 1904 St. Louis Centennial Exhibition, moved and re-assembled at Merriewold in 1905 by Jokichi Takamine), and the old Hartwood Post Office.

Built in the eighteenth century the Forestburgh log cabin was covered up by a later period structure for many years. It was discovered as part of a remodeling project and preserved by the Town with assistance from Town, County, Federal and private individuals and groups.

The Blackbrook District School, located on Route 42 near St. Joseph's, was a rural school. It has been preserved and is in good condition today in private ownership. Along Route 42 and Mill Road are the remains of the Stokes - Hartwell Saw Mill Foundation. Built by Jesse Dickinson, a noted constructor of mills, it was originally owned by Stokes who was a County Judge and a member of the assembly. William Hartwell, also a prominent citizen, later bought the mill in 1850.

David Handy was the first settler in Forestburgh. He served in the American Revolution and died in 1814. His grave site is noted by one of the eleven historic markers in the town.

The old Railroad Station (Gilman's Depot) is located on St. Joseph's Road. Made of stone and shingle, it served as a railroad station for the Port Jervis to Monticello Railroad from 1871 to 1958. The railroad was the major transportation mode used to bring visitors to St. Joseph in the late nineteenth and early twentieth centuries.

The Hartwood Post Office was designed by New York City Bradford Gilbert, an architect main railroad building, including the stone and rustic stations on the Ontario and Western Railroad. Built by Willis Butler in 1899, the stone house served as a post office from 1899 to 1945. It is a good example of the stone homes built in Forestburgh during this era.

Other outstanding historical and architectural resources include the Old Town Hall, the Forest Shrine and Cardinal Hayes Memorial, St. Thomas Aquinas Church, the Old Forestburgh Graveyard, the Ontario and Western Railroad Bridge and the Hartwell - Benzien Stone Wall.

== Notable persons ==
- Stephanie Blythe, opera singer
- John C. Perry (abt. 1832 - 1884), politician
- Kevin Meaney, stand-up comedian and actor
