= Montague Township, New Jersey =

Township in Sussex County, New Jersey, US

- Township
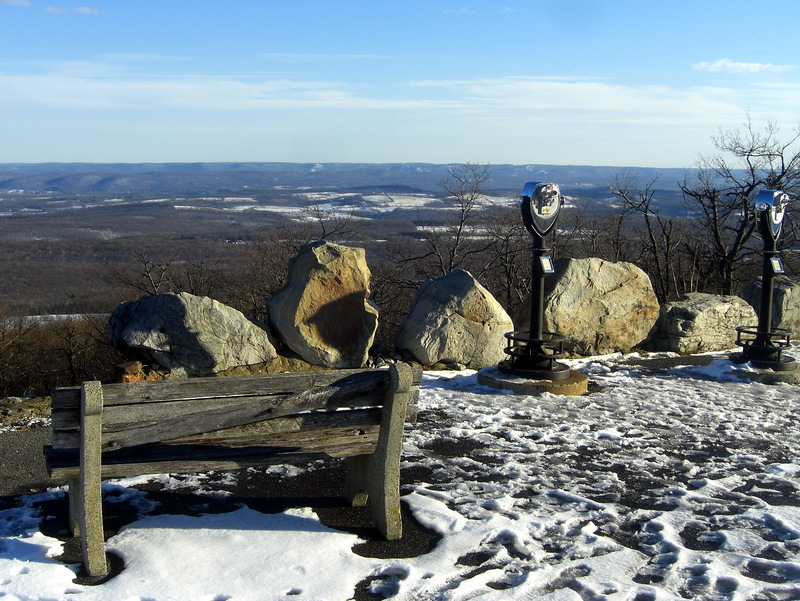
- High Point State Park

- Seal
- Nickname: "The Top of New Jersey"
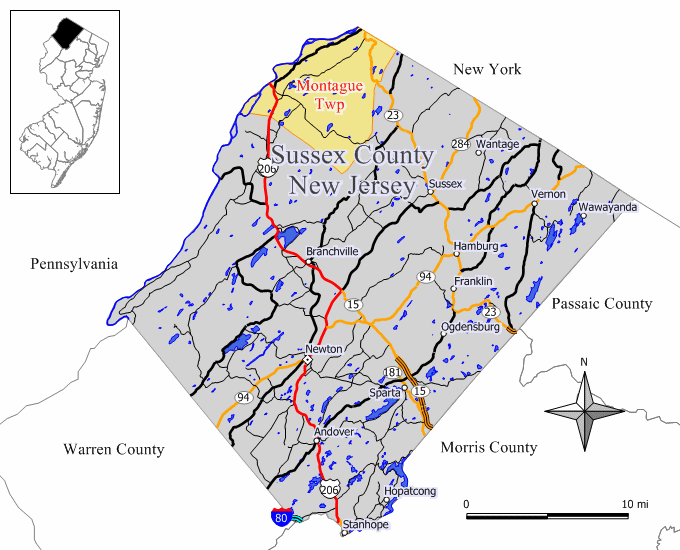
- Map of Montague Township in Sussex County. Inset: Location of Sussex County highlighted in the State of New Jersey.

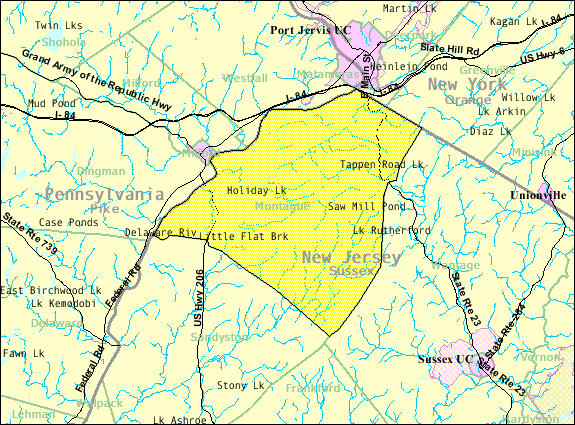
- Census Bureau map of Montague Township, New Jersey.

- Location in Sussex County Location in New Jersey Location in the United States
- Coordinates: 41.280958°N 74.730511°W
- Country: United States
- State: New Jersey
- County: Sussex
- Royal patent: March 26, 1759
- Incorporated: February 21, 1798

Government
  - Type: Township
  - Body: Township Committee
  - Mayor: George E. Zitone (R, term ends December 31, 2026)
  - Administrator / Municipal clerk: Dana Klinger

Area
  - Total: 46.63 sq mi (120.77 km^{2})
  - Land: 45.23 sq mi (117.15 km^{2})
  - Water: 1.40 sq mi (3.62 km^{2}) 3.00%
  - Rank: 38th of 565 in state 3rd of 24 in county
- Elevation: 1,066 ft (325 m)

Population (2020)
  - Total: 3,792
  - Estimate (2023): 3,850
  - Rank: 421st of 565 in state 13th of 24 in county
  - Density: 83.8/sq mi (32.4/km^{2})
  - Rank: 547th of 565 in state 22nd of 24 in county
- Time zone: UTC−05:00 (Eastern (EST))
  - Summer (DST): UTC−04:00 (Eastern (EDT))
- ZIP Code: 07827
- Area code: 973 Exchanges: 293, 948
- FIPS code: 3403747430
- GNIS feature ID: 0882256
- Website: www.montaguenj.org

Montague Township is a township in Sussex County, in the U.S. state of New Jersey, in the New York City Metropolitan Area. As of the 2020 United States census, the township's population was 3,792, a decrease of 55 (−1.4%) from the 2010 census count of 3,847, which in turn reflected an increase of 435 (+12.7%) from the 3,412 counted in the 2000 census. High Point, within Montague Township, is the highest elevation within New Jersey at an altitude of 1,803 feet (550 m) above sea level. It is the northernmost town in New Jersey.

Most of the area of Montague Township is public lands, primarily High Point State Park, Stokes State Forest, and Delaware Water Gap National Recreation Area. Montague is known for its scenery and wildlife; summer sports in the area include hiking, biking, camping (both public and private campgrounds are available), and fishing.

The derivation of the township's name is uncertain, though suggestions include that it was named after the George Montagu, 4th Duke of Manchester, as suggested by King George II, who approved the royal patent on March 26, 1759; for Lady Mary Wortley Montagu, an author who was popular at the time; or for solicitor John Montague. Montague was incorporated on February 21, 1798, by an act of the New Jersey Legislature as one of New Jersey's initial group of 104 townships.

The township borders both New York and Pennsylvania, the only municipality in New Jersey to border both states; it is a rural community that does not have any traffic lights. Before Montague Township was granted its own post office in the 1980s, residents had all of their mail delivered through the 12771 ZIP code for Port Jervis, New York, leading to situations where residents had New Jersey driver's licenses with a New York State mailing address.

== Geography ==
According to the United States Census Bureau, the township had a total area of 46.63 square miles (120.77 km^{2}), including 45.23 square miles (117.15 km^{2}) of land and 1.40 square miles (3.62 km^{2}) of water (3.00%).

Unincorporated communities, localities and place names located partially or completely within the township include Brick House, Duttonville, Four Corners, High Point, High Point Park, Lake Marcia, Mashipacong Island, Mashipacong Pond, Millville, and Minisink Island.

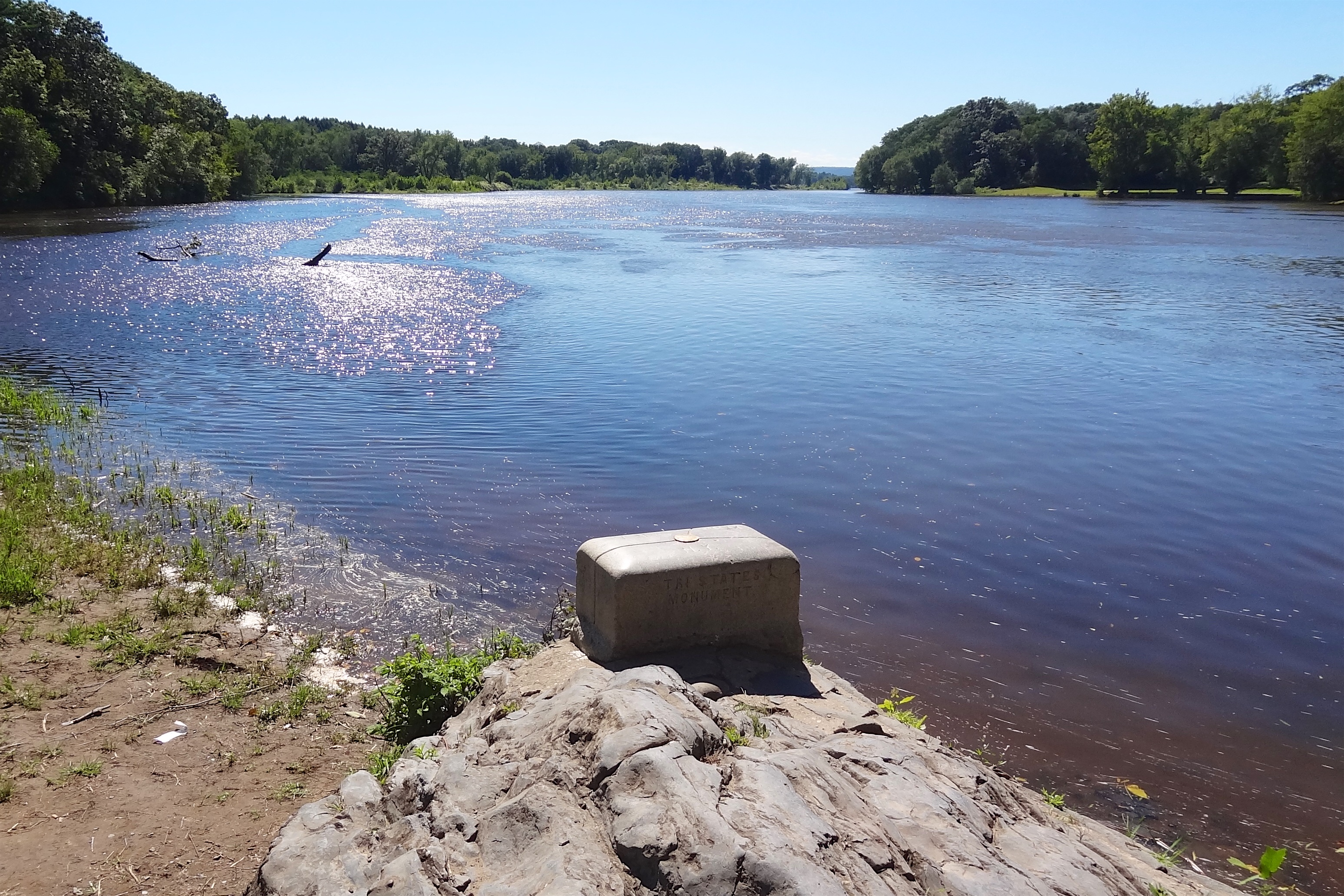
The Tri-States Monument at the confluence of the Delaware and Neversink rivers, northernmost point of New Jersey

The Tri-States Monument marks the northwest end of the New Jersey and New York boundary and the north end of the New Jersey and Pennsylvania boundary. It is also the northernmost point of New Jersey.

Montague Township borders the municipalities of Sandyston Township and Wantage Township in Sussex County; and New York State.

In 2019 only about 30% of the land was available for development, as the federal government and the State of New Jersey collectively own 70% or more of the land in the township.

=== Climate ===
This climatic region is typified by large seasonal temperature differences, with warm to hot (and often humid) summers and cold (sometimes severely cold) winters. According to the Köppen Climate Classification system, Montague Township has a humid continental climate, abbreviated "Dfb" on climate maps.

== Demographics ==
Historical population
| Census | Pop. | Note | %± |
|---|---|---|---|
| 1810 | 661 | | — |
| 1820 | 964 | | 45.8% |
| 1830 | 990 | | 2.7% |
| 1840 | 1,025 | | 3.5% |
| 1850 | 1,010 | | −1.5% |
| 1860 | 983 | | −2.7% |
| 1870 | 932 | | −5.2% |
| 1880 | 1,022 | | 9.7% |
| 1890 | 797 | | −22.0% |
| 1900 | 710 | | −10.9% |
| 1910 | 621 | | −12.5% |
| 1920 | 534 | | −14.0% |
| 1930 | 581 | | 8.8% |
| 1940 | 621 | | 6.9% |
| 1950 | 602 | | −3.1% |
| 1960 | 879 | | 46.0% |
| 1970 | 1,131 | | 28.7% |
| 1980 | 2,066 | | 82.7% |
| 1990 | 2,832 | | 37.1% |
| 2000 | 3,412 | | 20.5% |
| 2010 | 3,847 | | 12.7% |
| 2020 | 3,792 | | −1.4% |
| 2023 (est.) | 3,850 | | 1.5% |
Population sources: 1810–1920; 1840 1850–1870 1850 1870; 1880–1890 1890–1910 1910–1930; 1940–2000 2000; 2010 2020

In 2019 over 50% of the people living in the township first settled in the 1980s and 1990s. Rob Jennings of NJ Advance Media described Montague as racially homogeneous.

=== 2010 census ===
The 2010 United States census counted 3,847 people, 1,535 households, and 1,045 families in the township. The population density was 87.4 inhabitants per square mile (33.7/km^{2}). There were 1,802 housing units at an average density of 41.0 per square mile (15.8/km^{2}). The racial makeup was 92.33% (3,552) White, 2.63% (101) Black or African American, 0.23% (9) Native American, 1.01% (39) Asian, 0.00% (0) Pacific Islander, 1.46% (56) from other races, and 2.34% (90) from two or more races. Hispanic or Latino of any race were 6.39% (246) of the population.

Of the 1,535 households, 26.8% had children under the age of 18; 53.0% were married couples living together; 9.4% had a female householder with no husband present and 31.9% were non-families. Of all households, 25.9% were made up of individuals and 8.1% had someone living alone who was 65 years of age or older. The average household size was 2.50 and the average family size was 3.03.

22.8% of the population were under the age of 18, 6.9% from 18 to 24, 24.5% from 25 to 44, 31.9% from 45 to 64, and 13.9% who were 65 years of age or older. The median age was 42.3 years. For every 100 females, the population had 100.8 males. For every 100 females ages 18 and older there were 100.2 males.

The Census Bureau's 2006–2010 American Community Survey showed that (in 2010 inflation-adjusted dollars) median household income was $64,526 (with a margin of error of +/− $9,763) and the median family income was $68,542 (+/− $13,778). Males had a median income of $44,105 (+/− $14,473) versus $33,996 (+/− $5,832) for females. The per capita income for the borough was $26,411 (+/− $2,961). About 7.3% of families and 8.2% of the population were below the poverty line, including 12.6% of those under age 18 and 6.4% of those age 65 or over.

=== 2000 census ===
As of the 2000 United States census there were 3,412 people, 1,286 households, and 910 families residing in the township. The population density was 77.5 inhabitants per square mile (29.9/km^{2}). There were 1,588 housing units at an average density of 36.1 per square mile (13.9/km^{2}). The racial makeup of the township was 95.25% White, 1.79% African American, 0.18% Native American, 0.67% Asian, 1.08% from other races, and 1.03% from two or more races. Hispanic or Latino of any race were 3.28% of the population.

There were 1,286 households, out of which 34.9% had children under the age of 18 living with them, 57.4% were married couples living together, 8.2% had a female householder with no husband present, and 29.2% were non-families. 23.2% of all households were made up of individuals, and 7.5% had someone living alone who was 65 years of age or older. The average household size was 2.65 and the average family size was 3.14.

In the township the population was spread out, with 27.2% under the age of 18, 6.4% from 18 to 24, 31.2% from 25 to 44, 24.1% from 45 to 64, and 11.1% who were 65 years of age or older. The median age was 37 years. For every 100 females, there were 107.0 males. For every 100 females age 18 and over, there were 102.5 males.

The median income for a household in the township was $45,368, and the median income for a family was $50,833. Males had a median income of $39,569 versus $25,221 for females. The per capita income for the township was $20,676. About 8.5% of families and 12.0% of the population were below the poverty line, including 18.1% of those under age 18 and 6.3% of those age 65 or over.

== Economy ==
The central business district, which had five gas stations as of 2019, is on New Jersey Route 23. Business at the gas stations declined after a New Jersey tax increase in 2016 since drivers from New Jersey Route 23 had used the stations to get less inexpensive fuel, as fuel in New York State is more expensive.

== Parks and recreation ==
According to Richard Innella, who served as mayor, previously a softball team for women in Pennsylvania took Montague Township residents.

== Government ==
=== Local government ===
Montague Township is governed under the Township form of New Jersey municipal government, one of 141 municipalities (of the 564) statewide that use this form, the second-most commonly used form of government in the state. The Township Committee is comprised of five members, who are elected directly by the voters at-large in partisan elections to serve three-year terms of office on a staggered basis, with either one or two seats coming up for election each year as part of the November general election in a three-year cycle. At an annual reorganization meeting, the Township Committee selects one of its members to serve as Mayor and another as Deputy Mayor, each serving terms of one year.

As of 2024, members of the Montague Township Committee are Mayor George E. Zitone (R, term on committee ends December 31, 2026; term as mayor ends 2024), Deputy Mayor Joseph Krumpfer (R, term on committee and as deputy mayor ends 2024), Richard E. Innella (R, 2025), James LeDonne (R, 2024) and Fred Merusi (R, 2026).

=== Federal, state and county representation ===
Montague Township is located in the 5th Congressional District and is part of New Jersey's 24th state legislative district.

For the 119th United States Congress, New Jersey's 5th congressional district is represented by Josh Gottheimer (D, Wyckoff). New Jersey is represented in the United States Senate by Democrats Cory Booker (Newark, term ends 2027) and Andy Kim (Moorestown, term ends 2031).

For the 2026–2027 session, the 24th legislative district of the New Jersey Legislature is represented in the State Senate by Parker Space (R, Wantage Township) and in the General Assembly by Dawn Fantasia (R, Franklin) and Mike Inganamort (R, Chester Township).

Sussex County is governed by a Board of County Commissioners whose five members are elected at-large in partisan elections on a staggered basis, with either one or two seats coming up for election each year. At an annual reorganization meeting held in the beginning of January, the board selects a Commissioner Director and Deputy Director from among its members, with day-to-day supervision of the operation of the county delegated to a County Administrator. As of 2025, Sussex County's Commissioners are Director Jill Space (R, Wantage Township, 2025), Deputy Director Chris Carney (R, Frankford Township, 2027), Jack DeGroot (R, Sussex, 2026), William Hayden (I, Branchville, 2025) and Alan Henderson (R, Lafayette Township, 2027).

Constitutional officers elected on a countywide basis are Clerk Jeffrey M. Parrott (R, Wantage Township, 2026), Sheriff Michael F. Strada (R, Hampton Township, 2025) and Surrogate Gary R. Chiusano (R, Frankford Township, 2028).

=== Politics ===
Jennings described the township as leaning towards conservative politics. As of March 2011, there were a total of 2,448 registered voters in Montague Township, of which 328 (13.4% vs. 16.5% countywide) were registered as Democrats, 1,247 (50.9% vs. 39.3%) were registered as Republicans and 870 (35.5% vs. 44.1%) were registered as Unaffiliated. There were 3 voters registered as Libertarians or Greens. Among the township's 2010 Census population, 63.6% (vs. 65.8% in Sussex County) were registered to vote, including 82.4% of those ages 18 and over (vs. 86.5% countywide).

Gubernatorial election results for Montague Township
| Year | Republican | | Democratic | | Third party(ies) | |
| Year | No. | % | No. | % | No. | % |
|---|---|---|---|---|---|---|
| 2025 | 957 | 66.46% | 475 | 32.99% | 8 | 0.56% |
| 2021 | 901 | 75.08% | 282 | 23.50% | 17 | 1.42% |
| 2017 | 603 | 62.36% | 302 | 31.23% | 62 | 6.41% |
| 2013 | 750 | 74.55% | 219 | 21.77% | 37 | 3.68% |
| 2009 | 842 | 69.59% | 243 | 20.08% | 125 | 10.33% |
| 2005 | 714 | 64.15% | 338 | 30.37% | 61 | 5.48% |

In the 2012 presidential election, Republican Mitt Romney received 1,001 votes (63.6% vs. 59.4% countywide), ahead of Democrat Barack Obama with 530 votes (33.7% vs. 38.2%) and other candidates with 39 votes (2.5% vs. 2.1%), among the 1,575 ballots cast by the township's 2,426 registered voters, for a turnout of 64.9% (vs. 68.3% in Sussex County). In the 2008 presidential election, Republican John McCain received 1,150 votes (63.9% vs. 59.2% countywide), ahead of Democrat Barack Obama with 592 votes (32.9% vs. 38.7%) and other candidates with 35 votes (1.9% vs. 1.5%), among the 1,799 ballots cast by the township's 2,421 registered voters, for a turnout of 74.3% (vs. 76.9% in Sussex County). In the 2004 presidential election, Republican George W. Bush received 1,072 votes (68.5% vs. 63.9% countywide), ahead of Democrat John Kerry with 466 votes (29.8% vs. 34.4%) and other candidates with 20 votes (1.3% vs. 1.3%), among the 1,564 ballots cast by the township's 2,072 registered voters, for a turnout of 75.5% (vs. 77.7% in the whole county).

United States presidential election results for Montague Township 2024 2020 2016 2012 2008 2004
| Year | Republican | | Democratic | | Third party(ies) | |
| Year | No. | % | No. | % | No. | % |
|---|---|---|---|---|---|---|
| 2024 | 1,408 | 69.36% | 590 | 29.06% | 32 | 1.58% |
| 2020 | 1,331 | 65.57% | 657 | 32.36% | 42 | 2.07% |
| 2016 | 1,142 | 68.47% | 467 | 28.00% | 59 | 3.54% |
| 2012 | 1,001 | 63.76% | 530 | 33.76% | 39 | 2.48% |
| 2008 | 1,150 | 64.72% | 592 | 33.31% | 35 | 1.97% |
| 2004 | 1,072 | 68.81% | 466 | 29.91% | 20 | 1.28% |

In the 2013 gubernatorial election, Republican Chris Christie received 74.6% of the vote (750 cast), ahead of Democrat Barbara Buono with 21.8% (219 votes), and other candidates with 3.7% (37 votes), among the 1,015 ballots cast by the township's 2,446 registered voters (9 ballots were spoiled), for a turnout of 41.5%. In the 2009 gubernatorial election, Republican Chris Christie received 832 votes (68.6% vs. 63.3% countywide), ahead of Democrat Jon Corzine with 243 votes (20.0% vs. 25.7%), Independent Chris Daggett with 103 votes (8.5% vs. 9.1%) and other candidates with 22 votes (1.8% vs. 1.3%), among the 1,212 ballots cast by the township's 2,402 registered voters, yielding a 50.5% turnout (vs. 52.3% in the county).

United States Senate election results for Montague Township1
| Year | Republican | | Democratic | | Third party(ies) | |
| Year | No. | % | No. | % | No. | % |
|---|---|---|---|---|---|---|
| 2024 | 1,339 | 68.18% | 553 | 28.16% | 72 | 3.67% |
| 2018 | 977 | 66.96% | 377 | 25.84% | 105 | 7.20% |
| 2012 | 953 | 62.00% | 517 | 33.64% | 67 | 4.36% |
| 2006 | 652 | 63.61% | 299 | 29.17% | 74 | 7.22% |

United States Senate election results for Montague Township2
| Year | Republican | | Democratic | | Third party(ies) | |
| Year | No. | % | No. | % | No. | % |
|---|---|---|---|---|---|---|
| 2020 | 1,265 | 63.44% | 651 | 32.65% | 78 | 3.91% |
| 2014 | 640 | 64.91% | 299 | 30.32% | 47 | 4.77% |
| 2013 | 435 | 71.66% | 163 | 26.85% | 9 | 1.48% |
| 2008 | 1,046 | 60.74% | 564 | 32.75% | 112 | 6.50% |

== Education ==
Students in public school for pre-kindergarten through eighth grade attend the Montague Township School District. As of the 2023–24 school year, the district, comprised of one school, had an enrollment of 309 students and 37.5 classroom teachers (on an FTE basis), for a student–teacher ratio of 8.2:1.

Public school students in ninth through twelfth grades attend High Point Regional High School, also serves students from Branchville Borough, Frankford Township, Lafayette Township, Sussex Borough and Wantage Township (where the school is located). As of the 2023–24 school year, the high school had an enrollment of 803 students and 73.2 classroom teachers (on an FTE basis), for a student–teacher ratio of 11.0:1. They may enroll at Sussex County Technical School, which accepts students on a selective basis, and to the middle school charter program in Sparta Township.

== Infrastructure ==
The United States Postal Service established a post office in 1980. Prior to that year the post came from Port Jervis, New York with a 12771 zip code, giving the residents New York mailing addresses.

=== Transportation ===
As of 2019 there are no traffic lights in the town.

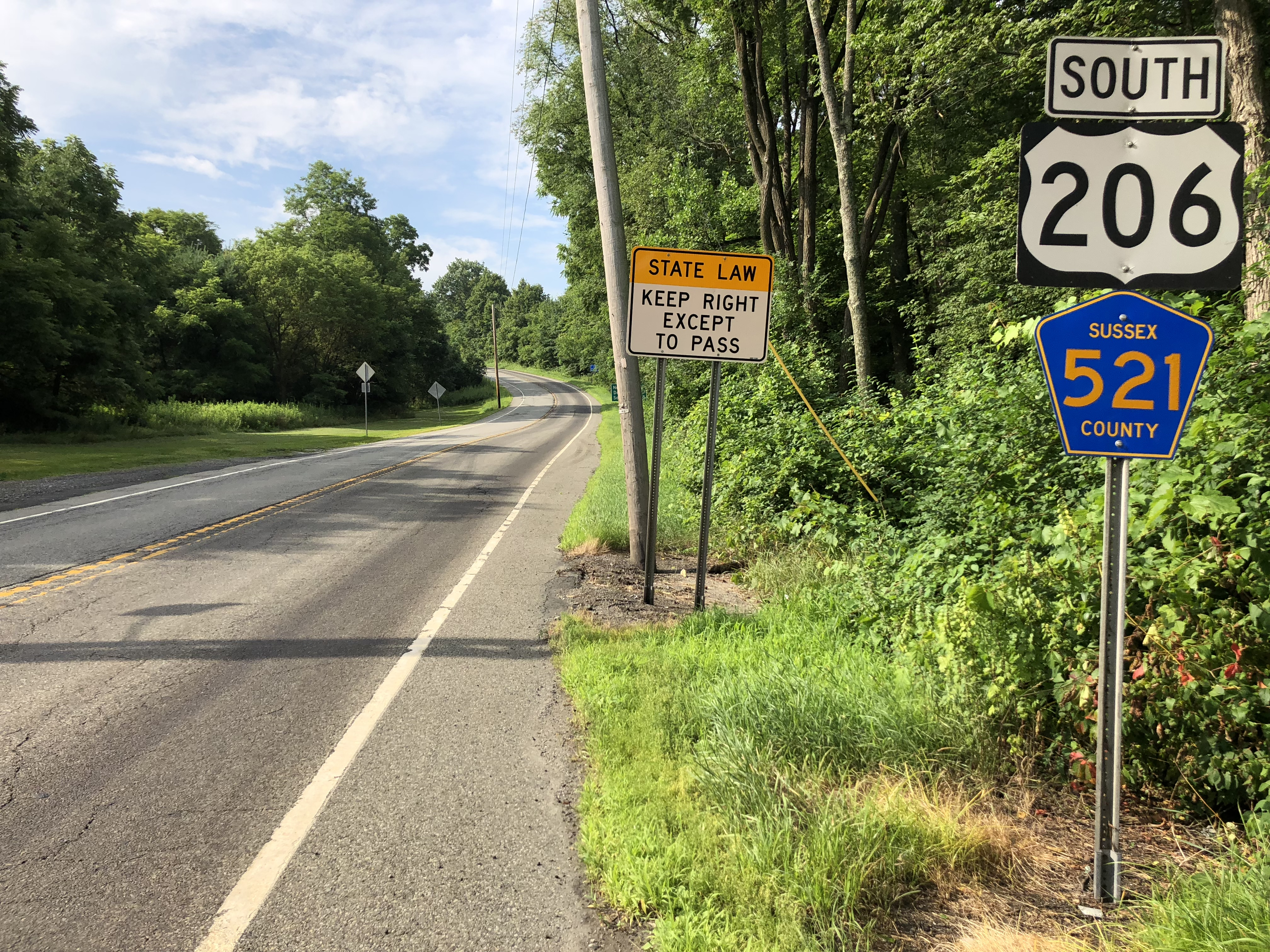
U.S. Route 206 and County Route 521 southbound in Montague Township

As of May 2010, the township had a total of 55.97 miles (90.07 km) of roadways, of which 25.50 miles (41.04 km) were maintained by the municipality, 23.85 miles (38.38 km) by Sussex County and 6.13 miles (9.87 km) by the New Jersey Department of Transportation and 0.49 miles (0.79 km) by the Delaware River Joint Toll Bridge Commission.

One U.S., state, and major county route each traverses the township. U.S. Route 206 passes through in the western part and crosses the Delaware River at the Milford-Montague Toll Bridge. Route 23 passes through the eastern part and serves as the entrance road to High Point State Park and ends at the New York border just south of Interstate 84. County Route 521 enters Montague concurrent with US 206, separates from US 206 just south of the Milford-Montague Toll Bridge, then heads northeast through the northwest portion of the township before ending at the New York state boundary.

The closest limited access road is Interstate 84 and is immediately over the state line in Deerpark, New York.

In the northernmost section of the township along Route 23, there are several gasoline stations, most likely because gas had historically been significantly less expensive in New Jersey than in Matamoras, Pennsylvania or Port Jervis, New York.

== Notable people ==
People who were born in, residents of, or otherwise closely associated with Montague Township include:

- Ed Banach (born 1960), athlete who won a gold medal in Freestyle Wrestling in the 198-pound-weight (heavyweight) class at the 1984 Summer Olympics in Los Angeles
- Lou Banach (born 1960), athlete who won a gold medal in Freestyle Wrestling in the 220-pound-weight (heavyweight) class at the 1984 Summer Olympics in Los Angeles
- John Westbrook Hornbeck (1804–1848), Whig Party member of the United States House of Representatives from Pennsylvania from 1847 to 1848
- Daniel Myers Van Auken (1826–1908), was a Democratic member of the U.S. House of Representatives from Pennsylvania from 1867 to 1871
- Kinuyo Yamashita, video game music composer and sound producer best known for her soundtrack for Konami's Castlevania
- Paul Zindel (1936–2003), playwright, young adult novelist, and educator who wrote The Effect of Gamma Rays on Man-in-the-Moon Marigolds.

== Wineries ==
- Westfall Winery - Now defunct. Replaced with a farm animal sanctuary
