= Franklin High School (Sussex County, New Jersey) =

Coordinates: 41.117390°N 74.582873°W

Franklin High School was a public high school in Franklin in Sussex County, in the U.S. state of New Jersey. The school closed in 1982, with the opening of Wallkill Valley Regional High School.

== History ==
Known as Franklin Industrial School when it was first established, the school's first graduating class was in 1924, while the first regular class graduated four years later. During an era when Sussex County had a limited number of high schools, Franklin High School at various points served students from Hamburg, Hardyston Township, Ogdensburg and Vernon Township in Sussex County and from Jefferson Township in Morris County

In the face of "badly overcrowded conditions" at Franklin High School, voters approved a pair of referendums in November 1972 for the creation of Wallkill Valley Regional High School, while voters in Vernon approved the construction of a new high school for township students. Students from Vernon Township were given the option to complete their education in Franklin or switch over to Vernon Township High School when it opened in September 1975.

For the 1978-79 school year, Ogdensburg withdrew from Franklin High School and began sending students to Sparta High School.

The school closed in 1982, with the opening of Wallkill Valley Regional High School, at which point the high school building was repurposed for use as Franklin Elementary School.

== Notable alumni ==
- Gertrude M. Clarke (1932–2020), science educator who primarily taught high school physics and nucleonics and extensively engaged in nuclear physics research
- Mike Ferrara (born 1958), retired basketball player best known for his collegiate career at Niagara University and Colgate University
- Bill Glynn (1925–2013), played in Major League Baseball (MLB) as a first baseman for the Philadelphia Phillies and Cleveland Indians
- Bob Gunderman (born 1934), National Football League (NFL) football player for the Pittsburgh Steelers
- Steve Nagy (1919–2016), MLB pitcher who played for the Pittsburgh Pirates in 1947 and the Washington Senators
