= Franklin Borough School District =

School district in Sussex County, New Jersey, US

Address
- 50 Washington Avenue Franklin, Sussex County, New Jersey, 07416; United States
- Coordinates: 41.116955°N 74.583373°W

District information
- Grades: PreK-8
- Superintendent: J.R. Giacchi
- Business administrator: Carlos Sarmiento
- Schools: 1

Students and staff
- Enrollment: 527 (as of 2025–26)
- Faculty: 49.0 FTEs
- Student–teacher ratio: 10.4:1

Other information
- District Factor Group: CD
- Website: www.fboe.org
Ind.	Per pupil	District spending	Rank (*)	K-8 average	%± vs. average
1A	Total Spending	$18,099	29	$18,891	−4.2%
1	Budgetary Cost	15,975	45	14,159	12.8%
2	Classroom Instruction	9,286	42	8,659	7.2%
6	Support Services	2,344	38	2,167	8.2%
8	Administrative Cost	1,985	62	1,547	28.3%
10	Operations & Maintenance	2,136	59	1,612	32.5%
13	Extracurricular Activities	218	55	104	109.6%
16	Median Teacher Salary	58,835	29	61,136
Data from NJDoE 2014 Taxpayers' Guide to Education Spending. *Of K-8 districts with 401-750 students. Lowest spending=1; Highest=64

The Franklin Borough School District is a comprehensive community public school district that serves students in pre-kindergarten through eighth grade from Franklin, in Sussex County, in the U.S. state of New Jersey.

As of the 2025–26 school year, the district, comprised of one school, had an enrollment of 527 students and 49.0 classroom teachers (on an FTE basis), for a student–teacher ratio of 10.4:1.

For ninth through twelfth grades, public school students attend Wallkill Valley Regional High School which also serves students from Hardyston Township, Hamburg Borough and Ogdensburg Borough, and is part of the Wallkill Valley Regional High School District. As of the 2023–24 school year, the high school had an enrollment of 617 students and 48.3 classroom teachers (on an FTE basis), for a student–teacher ratio of 12.8:1.

== History ==
A two-room school opened in 1871 with an enrollment of 50 students as Franklin's first public school. The building was expanded in 1914 to accommodate a vocational school in the central portion of the building, a left wing was added in 1922 and a right wing was constructed in 1926 at a cost of $150,000 (equivalent to $2.7 million in 2025), opening in September 1927. Franklin Industrial School had its first graduating class in 1924 with nine students, which rose to 14 in 1928 when the first full class graduated.

School history records that Babe Ruth, a frequent visitor to the Franklin area, and a group of local engineers oversaw the design of a baseball field whose dimensions matched those of the original Yankee Stadium. A 1960 construction project that added an auditorium and gymnasium to the school necessitated moving the field's original grandstand, considered at the time to be one of the best in the country.

1972 featured the school's largest graduating class, which declined after the opening of Vernon Township High School. Until then, students from Hamburg, Hardyston Township, Jefferson Township, Ogdensburg and Vernon Township, New Jersey all attended the high school as part of sending/receiving relationships.

In September 1982, Wallkill Valley Regional High School opened its doors, and Franklin High School closed theirs, making the class of 1982 the final class to graduate from Franklin High School. Franklin School K-12 then became Franklin Elementary School K-8.

The district had been classified by the New Jersey Department of Education as being in District Factor Group "CD", the sixth-highest of eight groupings. District Factor Groups organize districts statewide to allow comparison by common socioeconomic characteristics of the local districts. From lowest socioeconomic status to highest, the categories are A, B, CD, DE, FG, GH, I and J.

In 2024, the Franklin district joined in a process considering a regionalization of Wallkill Valley Regional High School with its constituent municipalities to form a common K–12 district.

== Schools ==
Schools in the district (with 2023–24 enrollment data from the National Center for Education Statistics) are:

- Franklin Borough School (502 students)

== Administration ==
Core members of the district's administration are:

- J.R. Giacchi, superintendent and principal
- Carlos Sarmiento, business administrator and board secretary

== Board of education ==
The district's board of education, comprised of nine members, sets policy and oversees the fiscal and educational operation of the district through its administration. As a Type II school district, the board's trustees are elected directly by voters to serve three-year terms of office on a staggered basis, with three seats up for election each year held (since 2012) as part of the November general election. The board appoints a superintendent to oversee the district's day-to-day operations and a business administrator to supervise the business functions of the district.
