= Cava Winery & Vineyard =

Winery in New Jersey, US

Coordinates: 41.163300°N 74.565297°W

- Location: 3619 Route 94, Hamburg, New Jersey, USA
- Coordinates: 41.163300 N, 74.565297 W
- Other labels: Ceci Bella
- First vines planted: 2005
- Opened to the public: 2008
- Key people: Anthony Riccio (owner); Jeff Blake (winemaker)
- Area cultivated: 5
- Cases/yr: 3000 (2012)
- Other attractions: Bistro
- Distribution: On-site, wine festivals, NJ liquor stores, home shipment
- Tasting: Tastings and tours on weekends
- Website: http://www.cavawinery.com/

Cava Winery & Vineyard is a winery in Hardyston Township (mailing address is Hamburg) in Sussex County, New Jersey. The vineyard was first planted in 2005, and opened to the public in 2008. Cava has 5 acres of grapes under cultivation, and produces 3000 cases of wine per year. The winery is named for the Italian word cava which means "cave," reflecting the mining heritage of Sussex County.

== Wines ==
Cava Winery produces wine from Cabernet Franc, Cabernet Sauvignon, Ciliegiolo, Chardonnay, Durif (Petite Sirah), Grechetto, Merlot, Muscat blanc, Pinot gris, Pinot noir, Riesling, Sagrantino, Sangiovese, Sauvignon blanc, Trebbiano, and Zinfandel grapes. Cava also makes fruit wines from açaí berries, apples, blackberries, blueberries, kiwifruit, peaches, pears, pomegranates, raspberries, strawberries, and watermelons. It is the only winery in New Jersey that produces wine from Ciliegiolo, Grechetto, and Sagrantino, which are vinifera grapes indigenous to the Umbria region of Italy. Cava is also the only New Jersey winery that uses açaí berries, pears, and watermelons. The winery has a separate brand for their fruit wines, named "Ceci Bella" after the owner's dog. Cava is not located in one of New Jersey's three viticultural areas.

== Features, licensing, associations, and publicity ==
The winery operates a bistro that sells appetizers and pizzas. Cava has a plenary winery license from the New Jersey Division of Alcoholic Beverage Control, which allows it to produce an unrestricted amount of wine, operate up to 15 off-premises sales rooms, and ship up to 12 cases per year to consumers in-state or out-of-state. The winery is a member of the Garden State Wine Growers Association and its subsidiary, Vintage North Jersey. In July 2012, Cava was profiled on the television show Road Trip with G. Garvin.

== See also ==
- Alcohol laws of New Jersey
- American wine
- Judgment of Princeton
- List of wineries, breweries, and distilleries in New Jersey
- New Jersey Farm Winery Act
- New Jersey Wine Industry Advisory Council
- New Jersey wine
