= HTPS =

HTPS may refer to:

- Harduaganj Thermal Power Station, at Qasimpur Power House Colony, Uttar Phtpsradesh, India
- Hardyston Township Public Schools, in Sussex County, New Jersey, United States; see Hardyston Township School District
- Hillsborough Township Public Schools, in Somerset County, New Jersey, United States; see Hillsborough Township School District

== See also ==
- HTP (disambiguation)
- HTTPS
