= Bob Gunderman =

American football player (1934–2024)

No. 82, 84
- Position: End

Personal information
- Born: October 8, 1934; Sparta, New Jersey, U.S.
- Died: May 28, 2024 (aged 89); West Milford, New Jersey, U.S.
- Listed height: 6 ft 3 in (1.91 m)
- Listed weight: 220 lb (100 kg)

Career information
- High school: Franklin (Franklin, New Jersey)
- College: Virginia
- NFL draft: 1957: 19th round, 227th overall pick

Career history
- Pittsburgh Steelers (1957); Winnipeg Blue Bombers (1959); Franklin Miners (1960); Akron Pros (1961); Paterson Miners (1962)

Career NFL statistics
- Fumble recoveries: 1
- Stats at Pro Football Reference

Robert Edward Gunderman (October 8, 1934 – May 28, 2024) was an American professional football end who played college football for University of Virginia and professional football in the National Football League (NFL) for the Pittsburgh Steelers in 1957. He appeared in four NFL games.

== Early life ==
Gunderman was born on October 8, 1934 in Sparta, New Jersey. He attended Franklin High School in New Jersey.

== College career ==
Gunderman played college football at University of Virginia from 1953 to 1956. He played on both offense and defense at Virginia and developed a reputation as "a scrapper", "a special weapon", and a player with "a zest for contact." On offense, he was a key blocker for Virginia's All-American fullback Jim Bakhtiar.

== Professional career ==
Gunderman was drafted by the Detroit Lions in the 19th round (227th overall pick) of the 1957 NFL draft. The Lions traded him to the Pittsburgh Steelers in August 1957 in exchange for a draft choice. He spent the 1957 season with the Pittsburgh Steelers, appearing in four games. He signed with the Winnipeg Blue Bombers in April 1959, but he was injured in a car crash in June 1959, then cut by the club in August. He played in 1960 with the Franklin Miners of the Eastern Football Conference, in 1961 with the Akron Pros of the United Football League, in 1962 with the Paterson Miners of the Atlantic Coast Football League.

== Death ==
Gunderman died in West Milford, New Jersey on May 28, 2024, at the age of 89.
