= Lawrence Mansion =

Historic house in New Jersey, United States

- U.S. National Register of Historic Places
- New Jersey Register of Historic Places
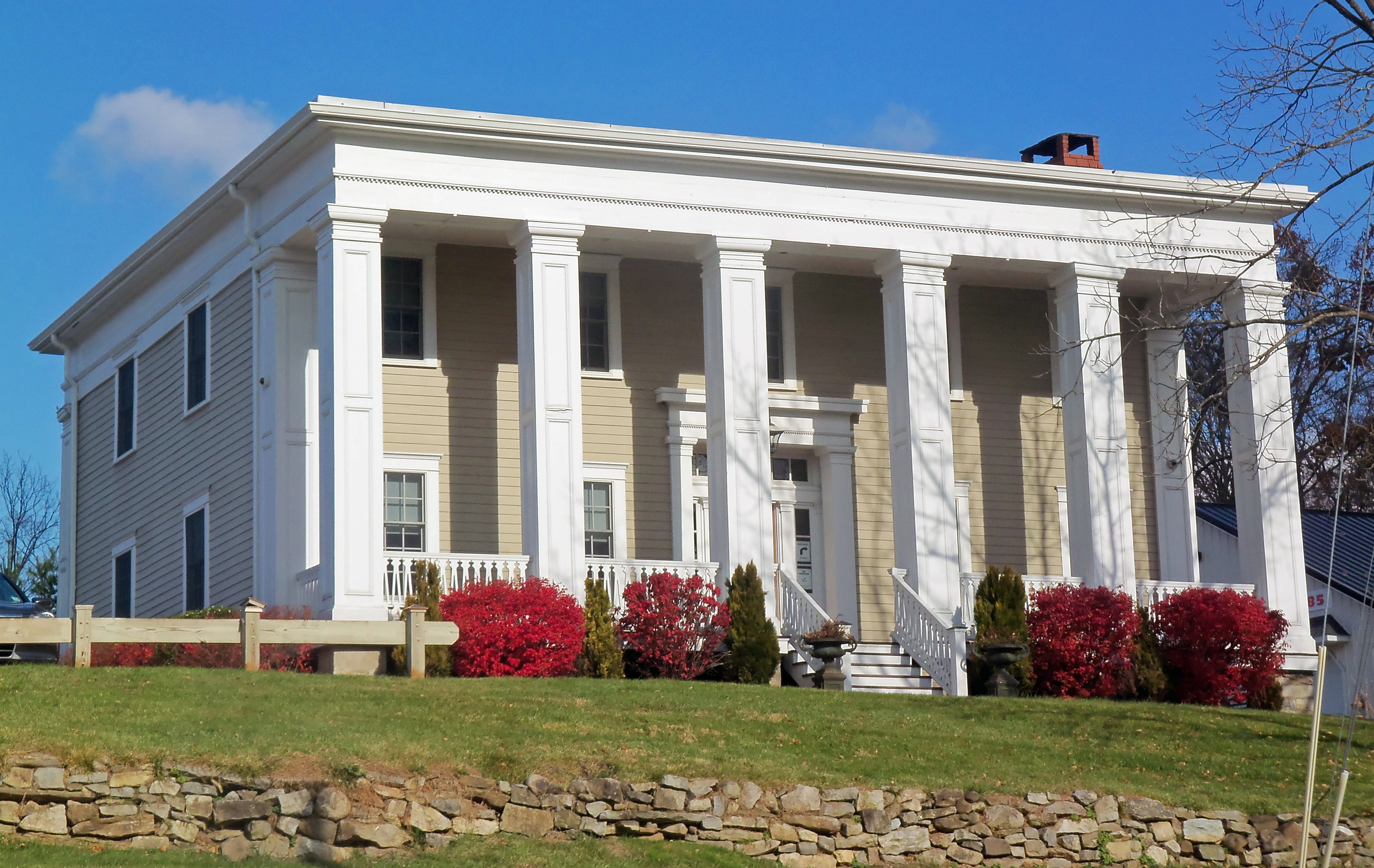
- West and south elevation, 2011

- Location within Sussex County, New Jersey Location within New Jersey Location within the United States
- Location: NJ Route 94, Hardyston Township, New Jersey
- Coordinates: 41°9′9″N 74°35′14″W
- Area: 11 acres (4.5 ha)
- Built: c. 1841
- Architectural style: Greek Revival
- NRHP reference No.: 79001522
- NJRHP No.: 2600

Significant dates
- Added to NRHP: November 2, 1979
- Designated NJRHP: October 19, 1976

The Lawrence Mansion is located on NJ Route 94 in Hardyston Township near the borough of Hamburg in Sussex County, New Jersey, United States. The Greek Revival mansion was built around 1841 and was added to the U.S. National Register of Historic Places on November 2, 1979, for its significance in agriculture, architecture, politics, and transportation.

== History and description ==
Thomas Lawrence was one of the early settlers in the community in 1780. His son, also named Thomas Lawrence, built this mansion around 1841. The house is a large, two-story frame building, which features Greek Revival architecture, especially the square doric columns.

== See also ==
- National Register of Historic Places listings in Sussex County, New Jersey
