= Hardyston Township School District =

Public school district in New Jersey, US

Address
- 183 Wheatsworth Road Hardyston Township, Sussex County, New Jersey, 07419; United States
- Coordinates: 41.139613°N 74.591906°W

District information
- Grades: PreK-8
- Superintendent: Michael Ryder
- Business administrator: Richard Rennie
- Schools: 2

Students and staff
- Enrollment: 593 (as of 2020–21)
- Faculty: 57.0 FTEs
- Student–teacher ratio: 10.4:1

Other information
- District Factor Group: FG
- Website: www.htps.org
Ind.	Per pupil	District spending	Rank (*)	K-8 average	%± vs. average
1A	Total Spending	$16,672	33	$18,891	−11.7%
1	Budgetary Cost	12,800	21	14,159	−9.6%
2	Classroom Instruction	7,971	28	8,659	−7.9%
6	Support Services	1,552	13	2,167	−28.4%
8	Administrative Cost	1,497	32	1,547	−3.2%
10	Operations & Maintenance	1,660	56	1,612	3.0%
13	Extracurricular Activities	121	67	104	16.3%
16	Median Teacher Salary	60,217	34	61,136
Data from NJDoE 2014 Taxpayers' Guide to Education Spending. *Of K-8 districts with more than 750 students. Lowest spending=1; Highest=84

The Hardyston Township School District is a community public school district that serves students in pre-kindergarten through eighth grade from Hardyston Township, in Sussex County, in the U.S. state of New Jersey.

As of the 2020–21 school year, the district, comprising two schools, had an enrollment of 593 students and 57.0 classroom teachers (on an FTE basis), for a student–teacher ratio of 10.4:1.

The district participates in the Interdistrict Public School Choice Program, which allows non-resident students to attend school in the district at no cost to their parents, with tuition covered by the resident district. Available slots are announced annually by grade.

The district had been classified by the New Jersey Department of Education as being in District Factor Group "FG", the fourth-highest of eight groupings. District Factor Groups organize districts statewide to allow comparison by common socioeconomic characteristics of the local districts. From lowest socioeconomic status to highest, the categories are A, B, CD, DE, FG, GH, I and J.

For ninth though twelfth grades, students attend Wallkill Valley Regional High School which consists of Franklin Borough, Hamburg Borough and Ogdensburg Borough, and is part of the Wallkill Valley Regional High School District. As of the 2020–21 school year, the high school had an enrollment of 590 students and 52.2 classroom teachers (on an FTE basis), for a student–teacher ratio of 11.3:1.

== Schools ==
Schools in the district (with 2020–21 enrollment data from the National Center for Education Statistics) are:

Elementary school

- Hardyston Township School with 318 students in grades PreK–5
  - Jennifer Cimaglia, principal

Middle school

- Hardyston Middle School with 274 students in grades 6–8

== Administration ==
Core members of the district's administration are:

- Michael Ryder, superintendent
- Richard Rennie, business administrator and board secretary

== Board of education ==
The district's board of education, comprised of nine members, sets policy and oversees the fiscal and educational operation of the district through its administration. As a Type II school district, the board's trustees are elected directly by voters to serve three-year terms of office on a staggered basis, with three seats up for election each year held (since 2012) as part of the November general election. The board appoints a superintendent to oversee the district's day-to-day operations and a business administrator to supervise the business functions of the district.
