= Samuel Fowler (1851–1919) =

American politician (1851-1919)

Member of the U.S. House of Representatives from New Jersey's 4th district
- In office March 4, 1889 – March 3, 1893
- Preceded by: James N. Pidcock
- Succeeded by: Johnston Cornish

Personal details
- Born: March 22, 1851 Port Jervis, New York, US
- Died: March 17, 1919 (aged 67) Newark, New Jersey, US
- Party: Democratic
- Profession: Politician

Samuel Fowler (March 22, 1851, in Port Jervis, New York – March 17, 1919, in Newark, New Jersey) was an American Democratic Party politician who represented New Jersey's 4th congressional district in the U.S. representative for two terms from 1889 to 1893.

== Early life and education ==
Fowler was the son of Colonel Samuel Fowler (1818–1863), an officer with the 15th New Jersey Volunteer Infantry Regiment during the American Civil War, and grandson of Samuel Fowler (1779–1844), who served in the House of Representatives from 1833 to 1837.

His mother, Henrietta Laura Brodhead Fowler (1827-1869), had a first cousin, Marcia Ross Brodhead, who married Congressman Daniel Myers Van Auken, and another first cousin, Kate Brodhead, who married Congressman and Senator Charles Van Wyck. She was also related to Congressmen John Curtis Brodhead and John Brodhead.

Fowler was born in Port Jervis, New York, on March 22, 1851. He attended the Newton (N.J.) Academy, Princeton College, and Columbia Law School in New York City. He was admitted to the bar of New York in 1873 and of New Jersey in 1876 and practiced law in Newark and Newton, New Jersey.

== Congress ==
Fowler was elected as a Democrat to the 51st and 52nd Congresses, serving in office from March 4, 1889, to March 3, 1893. In his second term he was chairman of the Committee on Merchant Marine and Fisheries. He was not a candidate for reelection to the 53rd Congress.

== Later life and death ==
After leaving Congress, he resumed the practice of his profession in Ogdensburg, New Jersey.

Fowler died in Newark on March 17, 1919. He was interred in North Church Cemetery in Hardyston Township, near Hamburg, New Jersey.

U.S. House of Representatives
Preceded by James N. Pidcock	Member of the U.S. House of Representatives from New Jersey's 4th congressional district March 4, 1889 – March 3, 1893	Succeeded by Johnston Cornish
