= Samuel Fowler (1779–1844) =

American politician

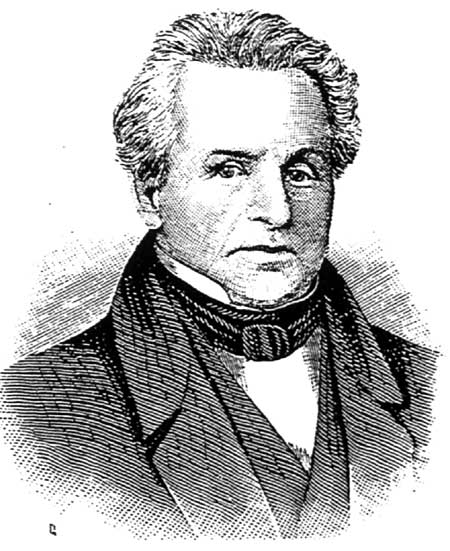

Member of the U.S. House of Representatives from New Jersey's at-large district
- In office March 4, 1833 – March 3, 1837
- Preceded by: Richard M. Cooper
- Succeeded by: William Halstead

Personal details
- Born: October 30, 1779 Newburgh, New York
- Died: February 20, 1844 (aged 64) Franklin, New Jersey
- Resting place: North Church Cemetery in Hardyston Township, New Jersey
- Party: Jacksonian Democrat

Samuel Fowler (October 30, 1779 – February 20, 1844) was a medical doctor, state legislator, and member of the United States House of Representatives from northwestern New Jersey. As the owner of zinc and iron mines and an iron works at Franklin, New Jersey, he became a noted mineralogist who discovered several varieties of rare minerals (chiefly various ores of zinc).

== Early life and education ==
Fowler was born in Newburgh, New York, on October 30, 1779. He attended the Montgomery Academy and subsequently graduated from Pennsylvania Medical College.

== Career ==
Fowler began to practice medicine in 1800 in Hamburg, New Jersey, when he was 21 years old. He moved to the present site of Franklin, New Jersey, in 1810. It is generally accepted that Fowler was responsible for naming the town Franklin, although it is uncertain whether he named it after Benjamin Franklin or his son, William Franklin. After zinc ore was found in the area, Fowler made a serious effort to develop it.

=== Political career ===
In 1827, Fowler became a member of the New Jersey Legislative Council (precursor to the New Jersey Senate).

He was elected as a Jacksonian Democrat to House of Representatives, serving in the Twenty-third and Twenty-fourth United States Congresses (March 4, 1833 – March 3, 1837).

== Death and burial ==
Fowler died on February 20, 1844, in Franklin, New Jersey and was interred in the North Church Cemetery in Hardyston Township, New Jersey.

=== Legacy ===
Fowler was the father of Colonel Samuel Fowler (1818–1863), an officer with the 15th New Jersey Volunteer Infantry Regiment during the American Civil War and grandfather of Samuel Fowler (1851–1919), who served in the House of Representatives from 1889 to 1893.

U.S. House of Representatives
Preceded by Richard M. Cooper	Member of the U.S. House of Representatives from New Jersey's at-large congressional district 1833–1837	Succeeded by William Halstead
