= Johnston Cornish =

American politician from New Jersey (1858–1920)

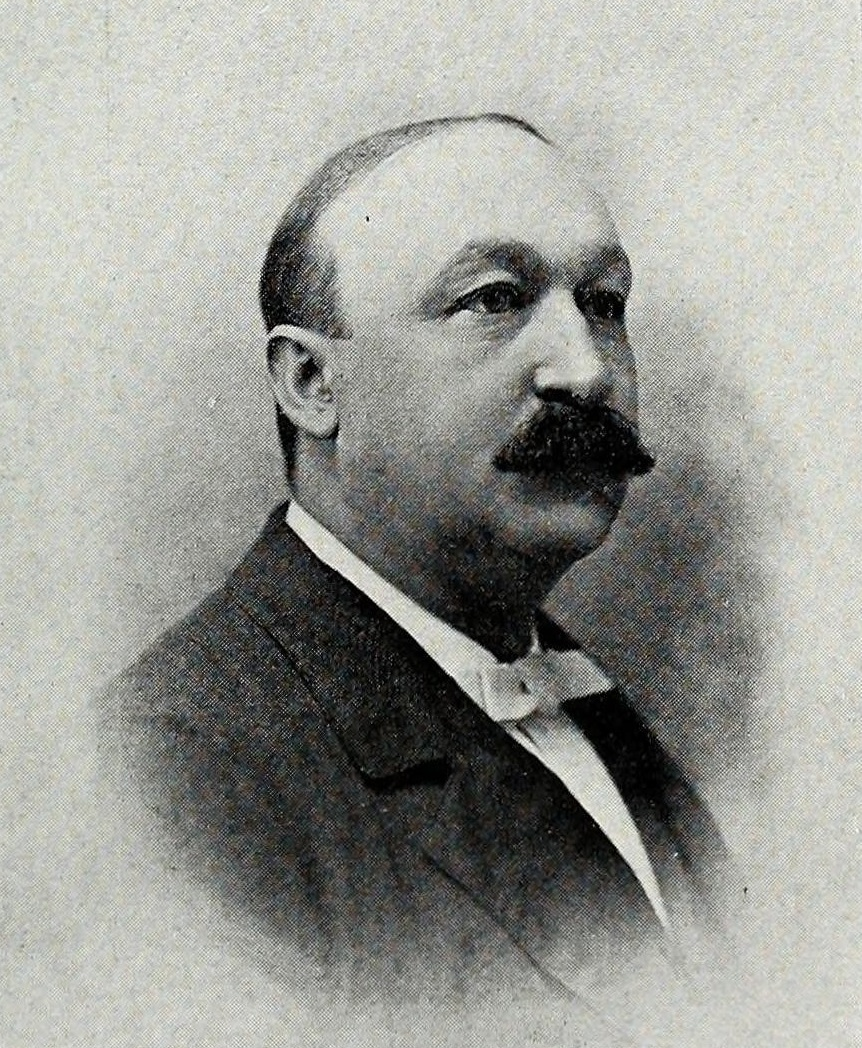
- From 1895's History of Trenton, New Jersey: The Record of its Early Settlement and Corporate Progress.

Member of the U.S. House of Representatives from New Jersey's 4th district
- In office March 4, 1893 – March 3, 1895
- Preceded by: Samuel Fowler
- Succeeded by: Mahlon Pitney

Member of the New Jersey Senate from Warren County
- In office 1891–1893
- Preceded by: Martin Wyckoff
- Succeeded by: Christopher F. Staates
- In office 1900–1902
- Preceded by: Isaac Barber
- Succeeded by: Isaac Barber
- In office 1906–1911
- Preceded by: Isaac Barber
- Succeeded by: Thomas Barber

Mayor of Washington, New Jersey
- In office 1884–1887

Personal details
- Born: June 13, 1858 Bethlehem Township, New Jersey, USA
- Died: June 26, 1920 (aged 62) Washington, New Jersey, USA
- Party: Democratic
- Profession: Politician

Johnston Cornish (June 13, 1858 – June 26, 1920) was an American businessman and Democratic Party politician from New Jersey. He represented the northwestern portion of the state (Hunterdon, Morris, Sussex, and Warren counties) in the U.S. House of Representatives for one term from 1893 to 1895. He also served three terms representing Warren in the New Jersey Senate between 1891 and 1911.

== Early life and business career ==
Johnston Cornish was born on June 13, 1858, in Bethlehem Township, New Jersey. His father, Joseph B. Cornish, was a leading Democratic Party politician who represented Warren County in the New Jersey Senate from 1873 through 1875.

Cornish attended the common schools. He moved with his parents to Washington in Warren County in 1870. He graduated from the Easton (Pennsylvania) Business College. Upon graduating, he entered his father's business, which was reincorporated as the Cornish Company, with Johnston as secretary and treasurer. The company manufactured pianos and organs. He became president of the company after his father's death, and he also served as president of the First National Bank of Washington. At the time of his death, he was also serving as president of Washington Water and the Warren County Bankers' Association.

== Political career ==
Cornish was elected mayor of Washington Township in 1884. He was re-elected in 1885 and again without opposition in 1886. He declined renomination in 1887 and in 1888. He was also a member of the Democratic State Committee and a delegate to several state and national party conventions to nominate candidates for governor and president of the United States.

=== New Jersey Senate ===
Cornish was first elected to the New Jersey Senate in 1890, before he had reached the constitutionally required age of thirty.

He served as member of the New Jersey Senate from 1891 to 1893, representing Warren County.

=== United States House of Representatives ===
In 1892, Cornish was elected to the 53rd United States Congress, serving from March 4, 1893 to March 3, 1895. He was an unsuccessful candidate for reelection in 1894 and lost again in 1896.

He accompanied William Jennings Bryan on his whistle stop tour through New Jersey, pausing in Washington on September 23, 1896.

=== Return to New Jersey Senate ===
In 1899, Cornish returned to the New Jersey Senate, representing Warren County for another three year term from 1900 to 1902. He was succeeded by Isaac Barber in 1902, but he was elected again in 1905, carrying twenty of the twenty-eight election districts in the counties. He served his final term from 1906 to 1908.

== Personal life and death ==
He died in Washington, New Jersey on June 26, 1920. He was interred in the Cornish family plot in Washington Cemetery.

U.S. House of Representatives
Preceded by Samuel Fowler	Member of the U.S. House of Representatives from New Jersey's 4th congressional district March 4, 1893–March 3, 1895	Succeeded by Mahlon Pitney
