= Old Monroe School House =

- U.S. National Register of Historic Places
- New Jersey Register of Historic Places
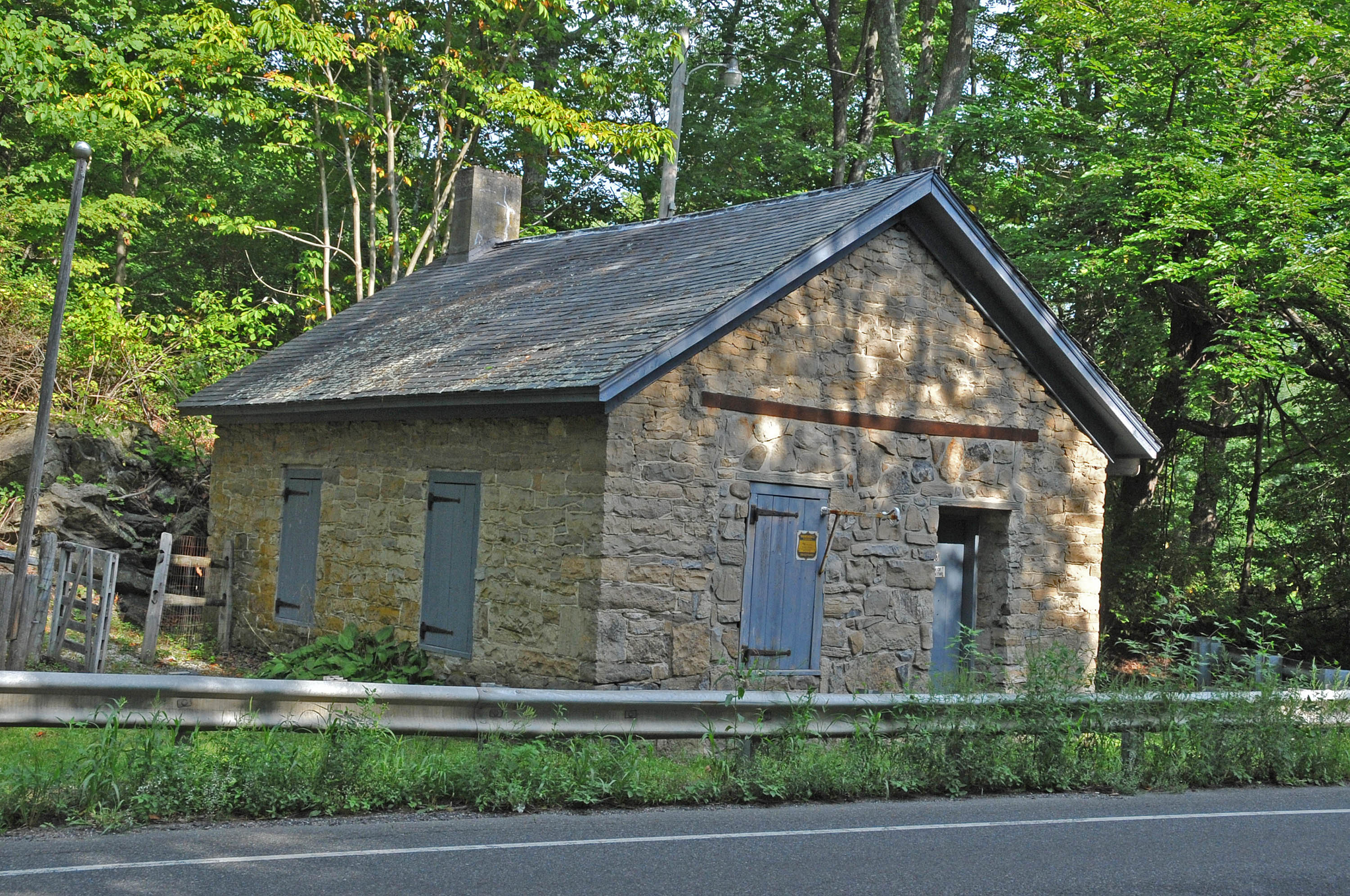

- Location within Sussex County, New Jersey Location within New Jersey Location within the United States
- Location: NJ 94, Hardyston Township, New Jersey
- Coordinates: 41°6′57″N 74°37′58″W
- Built: 1819
- NRHP reference No.: 77000911
- NJRHP No.: 2601

Significant dates
- Added to NRHP: August 12, 1977
- Designated NJRHP: October 19, 1976

The Old Monroe School House is located along NJ Route 94 in the Monroe section of Hardyston Township in Sussex County, New Jersey, United States. The schoolhouse was built in 1819 and was added to the National Register of Historic Places on August 12, 1977, for its significance in education. According to the nomination form, the building is the only stone one-room school in the county and the oldest extant schoolhouse in the county.

The building is owned by the Hardyston Heritage Society and is open to the public as a period education museum. It is usually open to the public on the first Sunday of the months of June through September.

== See also ==
- National Register of Historic Places listings in Sussex County, New Jersey
