= North Church Cemetery =

Historic site in Sussex County, New Jersey, US

Coordinates: 41.1341°N 74.6073°W

North Church Cemetery is a cemetery located in Hardyston Township in Sussex County, in the US state of New Jersey.

== Notable burials ==
- Samuel Fowler (1779–1844), who served in the House of Representatives from 1833 to 1837.
- Samuel Fowler (1851–1919), represented New Jersey's 4th congressional district from 1893–1895.
- Daniel Haines (1801–1877) 14th Governor of New Jersey, from 1843 to 1845, and from 1848 to 1851.
- John Linn (1763–1821) was a U.S. Representative from New Jersey from 1817 to 1821.
