= Richard M. Cooper =

American politician

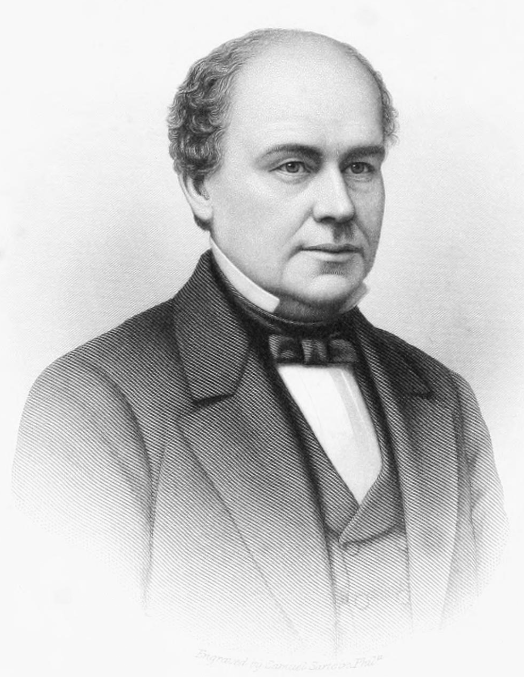

Member of the U.S. House of Representatives from New Jersey's at-large district
- In office March 4, 1829 – March 4, 1833
- Preceded by: Thomas Sinnickson
- Succeeded by: Samuel Fowler

Member of the New Jersey General Assembly
- In office 1807–1810

Personal details
- Born: Richard Matlack Cooper; February 29, 1768 Gloucester County, New Jersey
- Died: March 10, 1843 (aged 75) Camden, New Jersey
- Resting place: Newton Burying Ground
- Party: Anti-Jacksonian
- Spouse: Mary Cooper (m. 1798)
- Occupation: Banker, judge, politician

Richard Matlack Cooper (February 29, 1768 – March 10, 1843) was a Representative from New Jersey.

== Biography ==
Richard M. Cooper was born in Gloucester County, New Jersey on February 29, 1768. He completed a preparatory course of studies, then was engaged in banking. He married Mary Cooper on May 4, 1798.

He served as coroner from 1795 to 1799, and judge and justice of Gloucester County courts from 1803 to 1823. He was a member of the State General Assembly from 1807 to 1810, and president of the State Bank of New Jersey at Camden from 1813 to 1842.

He was elected as an Anti-Jacksonian to the Twenty-first and Twenty-second Congresses (March 4, 1829 – March 4, 1833), after which he declined to be a candidate for reelection.

He died in Camden, New Jersey on March 10, 1843. He is interred in the Newton Burying Ground.

U.S. House of Representatives
Preceded by Thomas Sinnickson	Member of the U.S. House of Representatives from New Jersey's at-large congressional district 1829–1833	Succeeded by Samuel Fowler
