= Heather Maloney =

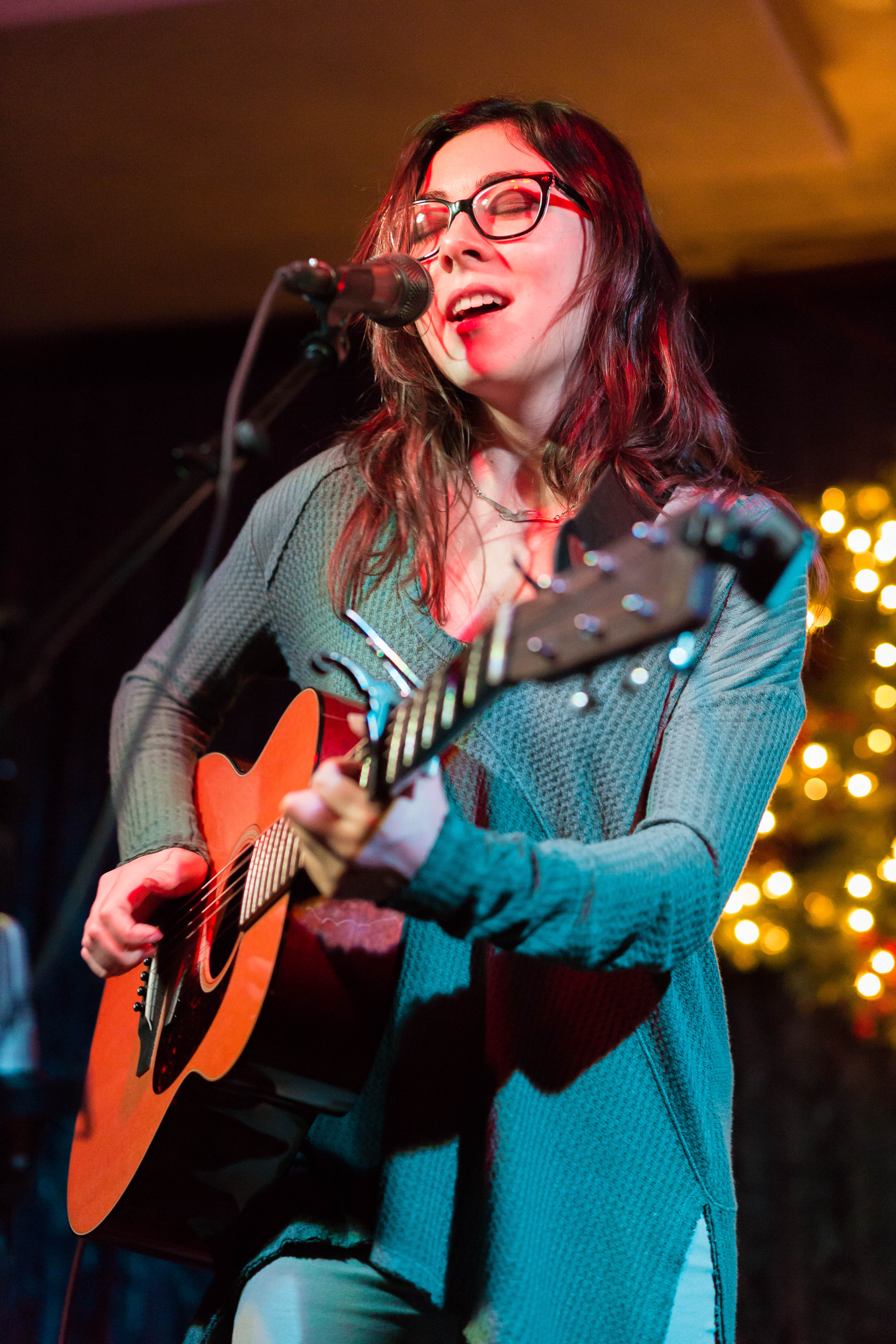

Background information
- Born: December 4, 1985 (age 40)
- Origin: Hamburg, New Jersey
- Genres: Folk; indie rock
- Occupation: Singer-songwriter
- Instrument: Guitar
- Years active: 2009–present
- Label: Signature Sounds Recordings
- Website: heathermaloney.com

Heather Maloney (born December 4, 1985) is an American singer-songwriter. In 2009, she self-released her debut album, Cozy Razor's Edge, followed by Time & Pocket Change in 2011. In 2012, Maloney signed with Northampton-based label Signature Sounds Recordings where she released Heather Maloney (2013), Woodstock (2014), Making Me Break (2015) and Just Enough Sun (2018). The full-length album Soil in the Sky was released in 2019. Six years later, Maloney released the album Exploding Star, dedicated to her father who died in 2021.

== Early life and education ==
Maloney was raised in Hamburg, New Jersey. She studied classical operatic singing, improvisational jazz vocals, and music theory.

From 2006 to 2009, Maloney lived and worked at a silent meditation retreat center in Barre, Massachusetts, taking vows of silence for days at a time. According to Maloney, the silence helped her discover songwriting; she wrote her first songs while living at the retreat center.

== Career ==
In December 2013, a New York Times blog wrote about and shared a video of Maloney performing 'Woodstock' with Darlingside; the writer favorably compared her to Mitchell. In 2014, Maloney released a collaborative EP with Boston quartet Darlingside entitled Woodstock, where she covers Joni Mitchell's song Woodstock. Following the release of Woodstock, Maloney and Darlingside embarked on a nationwide tour.

Following Woodstock, Maloney joined with producer Bill Reynolds to create Making Me Break (2015). The album features members of My Morning Jacket and The Wallflowers.

Reviewer Elisabeth Woronzoff writing in Pop Matters described Maloney's 2019 album Soil in the Sky as developing "a multitude of captivating musical twists all the while projecting earnest emotionality."
