= Penn State College of Earth and Mineral Sciences =

Coordinates: 40.798214°N 77.859909°W

College of Earth and Mineral Sciences
- Established: 1896
- Dean: John C. Mauro
- Location: University Park, Pennsylvania, U.S.
- Website: ems.psu.edu

The College of Earth and Mineral Sciences is a constituent, semi-autonomous part of Pennsylvania State University in University Park, Pennsylvania.

The College was founded in 1896 as a School of Mines, but, over time, diversified, becoming the College of Earth and Mineral Sciences. The college has five departments: Energy and Mineral Engineering, Geography, Geosciences, Materials Science and Engineering, and Meteorology and Atmospheric Sciences.

The Department of Energy and Mineral Engineering, as of fall 2007, now offers an undergraduate program in energy engineering, the first of its kind in the country.

The College also includes The Alliance for Earth Science, Engineering, and Development in Africa (AESEDA), The Energy Institute, The Earth and Environmental Systems Institute (EESI), The John A. Dutton e-Education Institute, and The Peter R. Gould Center for Geography and Outreach.

It is currently the smallest college (in terms of student enrollment) at the University Park campus.

Five employees (Michael E. Mann, Klaus Keller, Anne Thompson, Richard Alley, and William Easterling) contributed to the efforts of the IPCC that won the 2007 Nobel Peace Prize.

== Rankings ==
According to the latest United States National Research Council rankings (1995), The Department of Geography is ranked number one in the United States. The U.S. News Best Graduate Schools 2007 ranked the College of Earth and Mineral Sciences' Meteorology graduate program number one in the US. According to U.S. News rankings for 2009, the Petroleum and Natural Gas Engineering program ranks 5th in the nation and the Geology program ranks 3rd in the nation.

== Alumni ==
- Alexandra Tillson Filer, metallurgist, mineral collector, bookseller
- Gregory S. Forbes - Weather Channel Severe Weather Expert
- Elliot Abrams - Accuweather
- Jay Hammond - Governor of Alaska
- Joel N. Myers - Founder of Accuweather
