= Alexandra Tillson Filer =

American metallurgist and collector

- Born: Alexandra Tillson; July 1, 1916; Franklin, New Jersey, U.S.
- Died: January 4, 2015 (aged 98)
- Other names: Alexandra Tillson Taylor (after first marriage)
- Occupations: Metallurgist, mineral collector, bookseller
- Known for: Co-founder, Mineral of the Month Club

Alexandra Tillson Filer (July 1, 1916 – January 4, 2015) was an American metallurgist and collector. She was among the first women to earn a degree in metallurgy, in 1938.

== Early life and education ==
Alexandra Tillson was born in July 1916 in Franklin, near Franklin Furnace, New Jersey. Her father Benjamin Franklin Tillson, a Yale alumnus, was assistant superintendent of the New Jersey Zinc Company. Her mother, Florence Rutherford Smith Tillson, was an alumna of Smith College.

Tillson was a Girl Scout. She attended Pennsylvania State College, enrolled in the College of Earth and Mineral Sciences as a metallurgy major. She was the first woman to complete that course at Penn State, when her degree was granted in 1938.

== Career ==
After college, with her husband Russell Filer, she founded the Mineral of the Month Club, sending mineralogical samples to schools and libraries, with concise information sheets to help educators, students, and collectors learn more about minerals. They also ran a mineral shop in Redlands, California, and specialty bookshop in Yucaipa, California, Geoscience Books & Prints. In 1984, Filer was elected first president of the Geo-Literary Society at a Tucson meeting; the society was intended to gather those interested in "books, maps, drawings and related printed matter" about minerals, gems, and fossils.

Filer amassed a comprehensive collection of over three thousand Western stock certificates over thirty years; images of the certificates have been published for research purposes in recent years.

== Personal life ==
Alexandra Tillson married twice. In 1938 she married a fellow Penn State student, James Alonzo Taylor. She met geologist Russell Filer in California; they married in 1956. As of 2014, they were retired and living in Yucaipa, California. Tillson Filer died on January 4, 2015, at the age of 98.
