= Isaac Barber (New Jersey politician) =

American politician (1846-1933)

Member of the New Jersey Senate from Warren County
- In office 1897–1900
- Preceded by: Christopher F. Staates
- Succeeded by: Johnston Cornish
- In office 1903–1906
- Preceded by: Johnston Cornish
- Succeeded by: Johnston Cornish

Personal details
- Born: January 14, 1846 Forty Fort, Pennsylvania
- Died: September 30, 1933 (aged 79) Phillipsburg, New Jersey
- Party: Democratic
- Education: Lafayette College; University of Pennsylvania (M.D.)

Isaac Barber (September 4, 1854 – September 30, 1933) was an American physician, surgeon and Democratic Party politician who represented Warren County, New Jersey in the New Jersey Senate from 1897 to 1900 and 1903 to 1906.

== Early life and education ==
Isaac Barber was born in Forty Fort, Pennsylvania on January 14, 1846, to Robert Kennedy Barber and Mary (née Stroh) Barber. His family had deep roots in New Jersey, where his ancestor had settled Hopatcong, and his paternal grandmother came from an influential local political family. Both parents were descended from American revolutionaries.

Barber received his early education at local public schools and Blair Presbyterial Academy before enrolling at Lafayette College, where he graduated in 1876. He studied medicine under Professor Trail Green in Easton, Pennsylvania before receiving a medical degree from the University of Pennsylvania in 1879.

== Medical career ==
After graduating from Penn, Barber served as a medical referee for the Metropolitan Life Insurance Company of New York. He served as a pension examiner under the second administration of President Grover Cleveland from 1892 until 1897.

For two years, he was the Phillipsburg, New Jersey city physician and a member of the board of health. He practiced medicine in Phillipsburg with his brother Thomas.

== Political career ==
In 1896, Barber was elected to represent Warren County in the New Jersey Senate. He served one term and was succeeded by Johnston Cornish in 1899, but was elected in 1902 for another three-year term. His brother Thomas was elected to the same seat in 1911. Between his terms, he served as assistant surgeon general of New Jersey in 1901.

In 1912, Governor Woodrow Wilson appointed him to the state board of tax assessors, and he served until the board was eliminated by the Economy and Efficiency Act of 1915 and its functions transferred to the new board of taxes and assessments. He was reappointed by governors James Fairman Fielder, George Sebastian Silzer, and A. Harry Moore.

== Personal life and death ==
Barber married Bridget McIlhenny on June 26, 1901, in Phillipsburg.

He was an avid golfer and in 1903 was slated to captain the Senate team in a legislative golf match proposed by Everett Colby. According to testimony at a 1913 board of assessors meeting, Barber was deaf.

Barber was a member of the Knights of Pythias, serving for eight years as brigade surgeon for the New Jersey Brigade of the UKRP. He was also a member of the Elks, the New Jersey Medical Society, and other fraternities.

He died in Phillipsburg on September 30, 1933, after a short illness.
