= Monroe, Sussex County, New Jersey =

Populated place in Sussex County, New Jersey, US

Monroe, New Jersey
- Unincorporated community
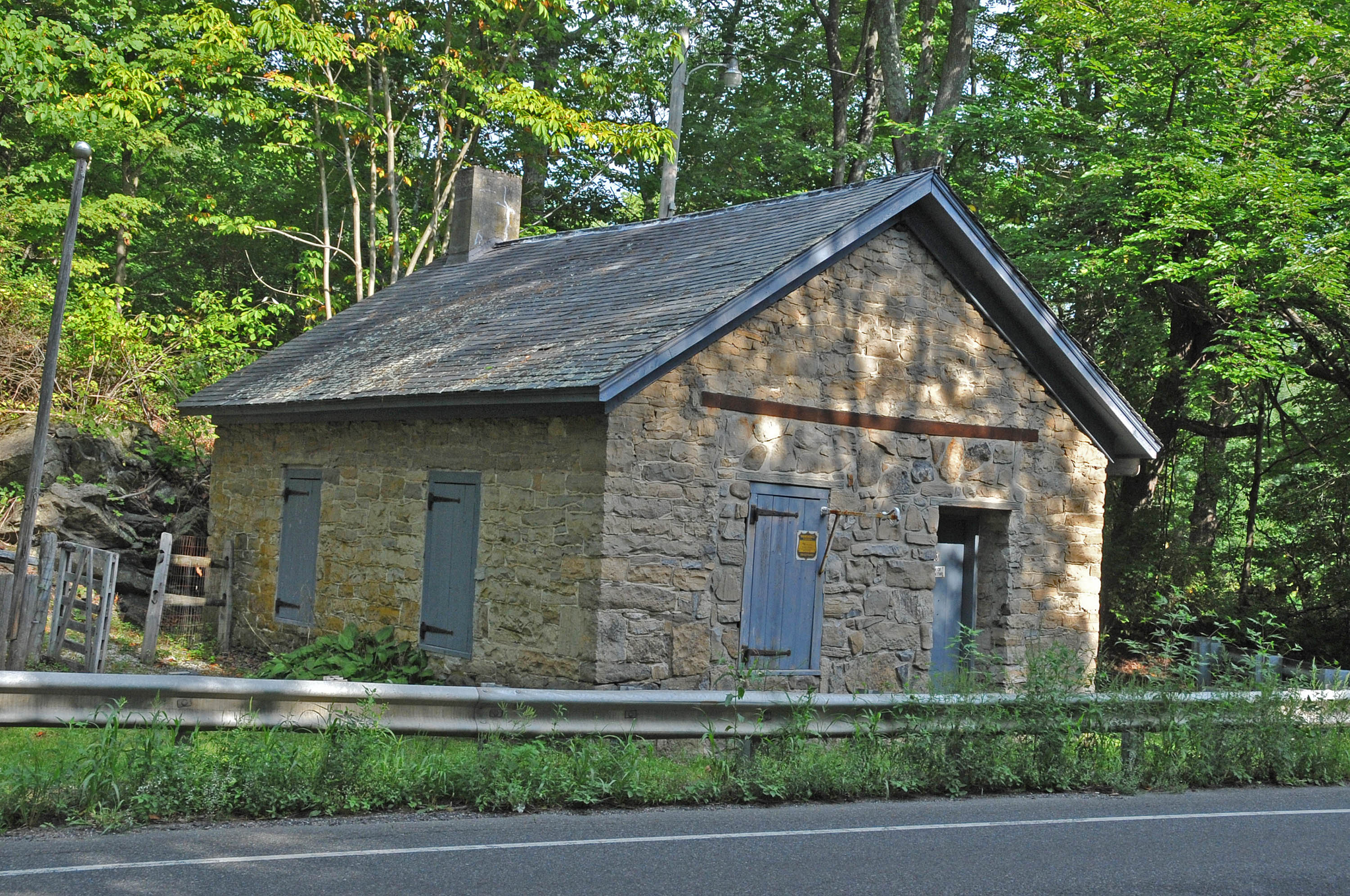
- Old Monroe School House, listed on the National Register of Historic Places

- Location within Sussex County, New Jersey Location within New Jersey Location within the United States
- Coordinates: 41°6′52″N 74°38′3″W
- Country: United States
- State: New Jersey
- County: Sussex
- Townships: Hardyston and Sparta
- GNIS feature ID: 878437

Monroe, historically known as Monroe Corners, is an unincorporated community located along North Church Road (NJ Route 94) at the border between the townships of Hardyston and Sparta in Sussex County, New Jersey, United States. The New Jersey Midland Railway built a station here named Monroe Corners sometime before 1872. The Old Monroe School House, a one-room stone school house built in 1819, was listed on the National Register of Historic Places in 1977.
