= John Linn (politician) =

American politician

Member of the U.S. House of Representatives from New Jersey's at-large congressional district
- In office March 4, 1817 – January 5, 1821
- Preceded by: Thomas Ward
- Succeeded by: Samuel Swan

Sheriff of Sussex County, New Jersey
- In office 1812

Judge of the Court of Common Pleas
- In office 1805–1821

Member of the New Jersey General Assembly from Sussex County
- In office 1801–1804

Personal details
- Born: December 3, 1763
- Died: January 5, 1821 (aged 57) Washington, D.C.
- Resting place: North Church Cemetery, Hardyston, New Jersey, US

Military service
- Allegiance: United States
- Branch/service: Continental Army
- Rank: Sergeant
- Battles/wars: American Revolution

John Linn (December 3, 1763 – January 5, 1821) was a U.S. representative from New Jersey from 1817 to 1821.

Born near Johnsonburg, Hardwick Township, New Jersey, Linn moved with his father to Sussex County, New Jersey. He attended the common schools. He served in the Continental Army as a private in the First Regiment, Captain Mannings's company. He was promoted to sergeant. He served as member of the New Jersey General Assembly 1801–1804. He served as judge of the court of common pleas 1805–1821 and the Sheriff of Sussex County in 1812.

Linn was elected as a Republican to the Fifteenth and Sixteenth Congresses and served from March 4, 1817, until his death in Washington, D.C., on January 5, 1821. He was interred in North Hardyston Cemetery in Hardyston Township, New Jersey.

== See also ==
- List of members of the United States Congress who died in office (1790–1899)

U.S. House of Representatives
| Preceded by Thomas Ward | Member of the U.S. House of Representatives from New Jersey's at-large congressional district 1817–1821 | Succeeded by Samuel Swan |
