= Gertrude M. Clarke =

American educator

Gertrude Margaret Clarke
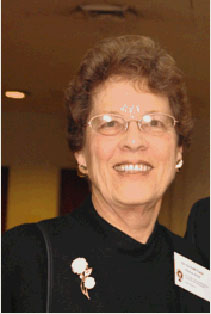
- Born: May 28, 1932; Franklin, New Jersey
- Died: May 15, 2020 (aged 87)
- Education: Douglass College (Bachelor's); Rutgers University (PhD)
- Occupation: Educator

Gertrude M. Clarke was a former educator who primarily taught high school physics and nucleonics and extensively engaged in nuclear physics research. She founded the New Jersey Business/Industry/Science Education Consortium (NJ BISEC) and served as its executive director from 1981 until 1999. She was also on the Board of Trustees of the New Jersey Inventors Hall of Fame for sixteen years, and President Emeritus from 2012.

== Education ==
Raised in Franklin, New Jersey, Gertrude M. Clarke graduated from Franklin High School and received her baccalaureate degree from Douglass College in 1954. Her pre-doctoral studies included radiological courses at Rutgers University, electronics at the RCA Institute, chemistry, and physics at Seton Hall University and atomic, nuclear and solid-state physics at the Yale University Graduate School.

In 1987 she received her Ph.D. from Rutgers University. Her thesis was titled A Reassessment of Gastrointestinal Dose from a Continental United States Nuclear Weapons Test.

== Career and Research ==
Clarke taught physics, science survey, practical chemistry and environmental science classes at Chatham High School in New Jersey. She designed a college-level course for accelerated seniors unique to the state called Nucleonics.

Clarke was a medical associate at the Brookhaven National Laboratory (BNL) and assisted in conducting research. She conducted independent research on the "Generation of Electromagnetic Radiation by the Interaction of Charged Particle Beams Transiting Periodic Structures" primarily using the Rutgers University (New Brunswick, NJ) accelerator. In 1978 she was given the opportunity to continue that research using the cyclotron at Harvard University. She also conducted experiments at the Stevens Institute of Technology (Hoboken, NJ) laser laboratory. In 1985 she was selected by the Lawrence Berkeley Laboratory (California) for a Residence in Science & Technology Program.

Starting in 1975 in Washington, D.C. she gave more than forty invitational speeches at conferences throughout the country about the need for development of industry-education partnerships. In 1995 Clarke was a panelist with the U.S. Secretary of Education, R. Riley, in a satellite TV program titled Perspectives on Math and Science. Her last speech on the subject of strategies for effecting educational change at the request of the National Alliance of Business (Washington, D.C., May 1999) was titled "Employers & Educators Working Together".

In 1980 Clarke was invited to write an article titled "Teaching physics at Chatham High School" by the editor of The Physics Teacher magazine Clarke has presented invitational lectures at Yale, Wesleyan, Princeton Universities and other collegiate institutions on "The Use of High Energy Particle Beams as a Modality for the Treatment of Localized Cancer".

In 1981 Clarke established The New Jersey Business/Industry/Science Education Consortium (NJ BISEC), an organization dedicated to improving the teaching/learning process so that kindergarten through grade 12 New Jersey students could experience the excitement and recognize the relevance of science, mathematics, computer science and technology. Automatic Data Processing, Atlantic Electric, Bristol-Myers-Squibb, Exxon Chemical Company, Ciba Pharmaceuticals, Honeywell, Johnson & Johnson, Mobil Chemical Company, Unilever Research U.S., Merck, Public Service Electric & Gas Company, and Hoffman-LaRoche were among the many New Jersey companies enlisted so that NJ BISEC could provide competitive grants and conduct diverse training programs for teachers throughout New Jersey. In addition 13 University research laboratories, several hospitals, the State of New Jersey, and the National Science Foundation were enlisted to contribute financial and human resources. Clarke directed the NJ BISEC for 18 years, raising millions of dollars to provide training programs designed to improve the quality of teaching. More than 1.8 million dollars for direct-award grants and stipends were given to teachers for participating in those various programs.

At the 1992 New Jersey Science Convention in Cranford, Clarke gave a talk titled "Classroom Connections with New Jersey's Science and Math Industries".

In 1994 she gave a lecture titled "Medical Applications of High Energy Charged Particles" at the annual Physics Conference and Exploratorium for High School Teachers and Students (March 16, 1994) held at New Jersey Institute of Technology (Newark, NJ)

In 1996 Clarke was invited to become a board of trustees member of the New Jersey Inventors Hall of Fame. In her capacity as president starting in 2006, she acquired a new headquarters and sponsor in Stevens Institute of Technology (Hoboken, NJ). She re-instituted the annual black-tie awards banquet and ceremony and led funding efforts to financially stabilize the organization. With board approval she instituted the prestigious "Trustees Award" which recognized annually one person who has made an outstanding contribution to the inventive and/or innovative process in New Jersey. On her retirement as president of the NJIHoF she was presented by the board of trustees with the first "Outstanding Contributions Award". Clarke served as NJIHoF president from May 2006 to December 2011.

=== Awards and honors ===
In 1978 Princeton University cited Gertrude Clarke for Distinguished Secondary School Teaching in the State of New Jersey. In 1979 Douglass College presented her with The Douglass Society Award for Distinguished Achievement. In 1981 Clarke was presented with the Citation for Distinguished Service to Science Education Award by The National Science Teachers Association. In 1985 Clarke was a New Jersey finalist for the Presidential Award for Excellence in Science Teaching. In 1985 she was selected by the Lawrence Berkeley Laboratory (California) for a Residence in Science & Technology Program. In 1989 Clarke received the first National Teacher Award for Community Service award. The award honored her for "her contributions to the New Jersey Business/Industry/Science Education Consortium as an outstanding teacher who has provided exemplary service and leadership in the development of the Consortium's activities". The award was presented by P. Roy Vagelos, M.D., chairman and CEO of Merck and Company and John Fowler, PhD, director of the Triangle Coalition for Science and Technology Education. Clarke was also cited in the local newspaper. In 2011 Clarke received the NJIHoF Outstanding Contribution Award for her "Untiring Dedication, Contributions, Service, Leadership, and Guidance of the Organization". In 2013 Clarke was a recipient of the 32nd annual "State of New Jersey Woman of Achievement Award" sponsored by New Jersey State Federation of Woman's Clubs of GFWC.
