= HTP =

HTP may refer to:

== Music ==
- Heitor Pereira, a composer professionally known as Heitor TP
- Hughes Turner Project, a British rock group
  - HTP (album), their 2002 debut album
- "Hail to Pitt", a fight song of the University of Pittsburgh

== Other uses ==
- Belarus High Technologies Park
- Hasee Toh Phasee, a 2014 Indian romantic comedy film
- Heated tobacco product
- High-test peroxide, a highly concentrated solution of hydrogen peroxide, used e.g. as a rocket propellant
- Hotep (Egyptian: ḥtp), regularly found in the names of ancient Egyptian figures
- 5-hydroxytryptophan (abbreviated 5-HTP)
- HTP Winward Motorsport, a German auto racing team
