= Turn Up the Heat with G. Garvin =

- Starring: Gerry Garvin
- Country of origin: United States
- No. of episodes: 53

Production
- Running time: 30 minutes
- Production company: Powerhouse Productions

Original release
- Network: TV One
- Release: 2004

Turn Up the Heat with G. Garvin is a television, cooking show hosted by Gerry Garvin. The show previously aired on Sundays at 6:00 PM (EST) on the TV One network.

== Program ==
Turn Up the Heat with G. Garvin premiered in September 2004 after Gerry Garvin was given his own television show after several high-profile chef tenures at various other venues. The show profiles Garvin and his cooking techniques and recipes. His catchphrase or signature has become "super simple" recipes, as he stated about them if I can do it, you can do it. The show frequently has celebrity guest stars that help Garvin in the kitchen or have their own recipes to display.

Season 2 premiered on Cooking Channel in August 2011 with the first episode, Georgia Roadtrip with G. Garvin. Like the first season, the second season utilized Garvin's own cooking techniques and recipes, except the new season showed Garvin traveling to various locations for on-site demonstrations. This included a shrimp and grits recipe cooked entirely at sea on F/V Daddy's Boy, a shrimp boat owned by Sweet Savannah Shrimp as well as a signature snapper dish at Tybee Island's North Beach Bar & Grill.
