= Hardyston Township, New Jersey =

Township in Sussex County, New Jersey, US

- Township
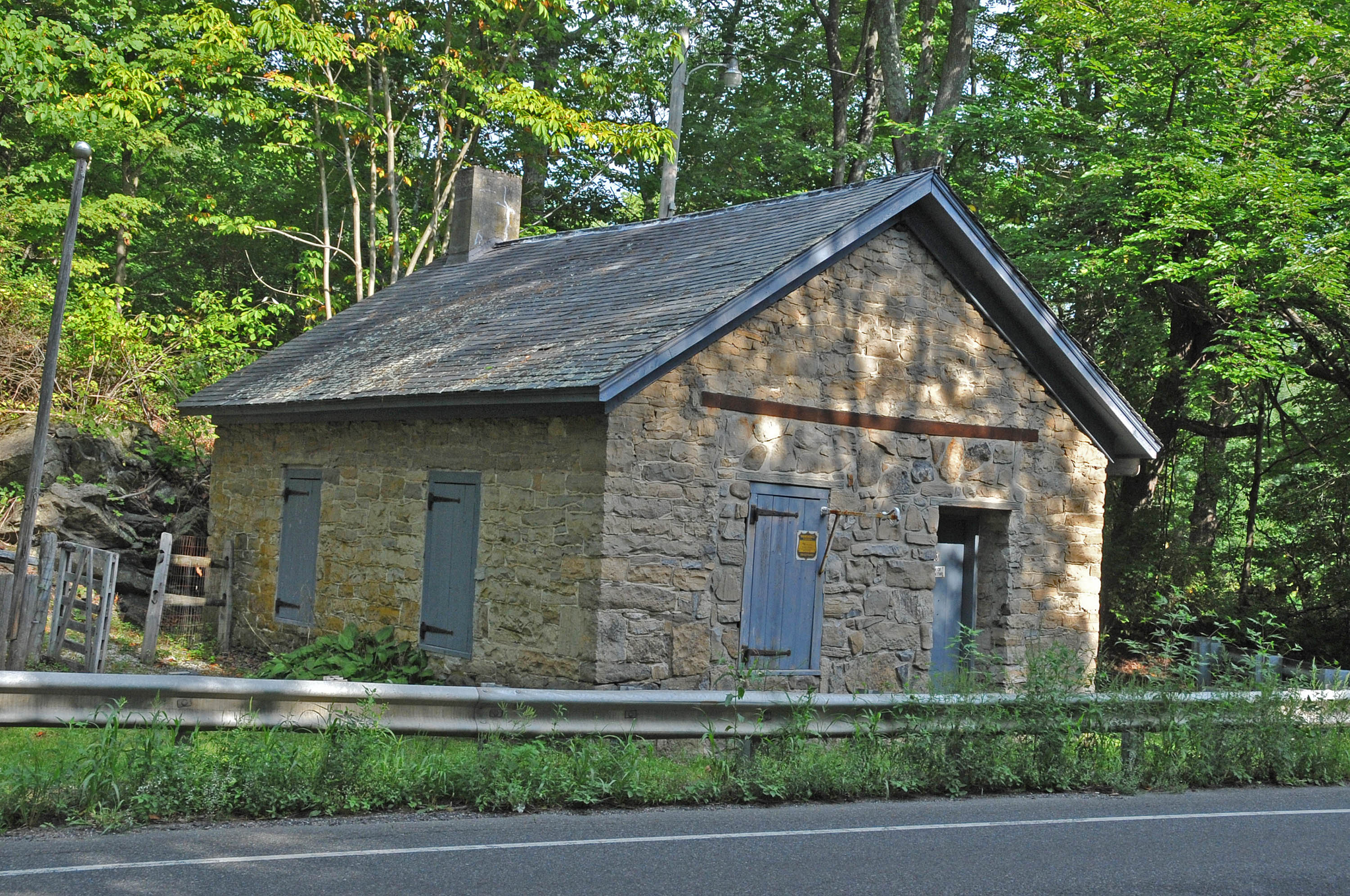
- Old Monroe School House

- Seal

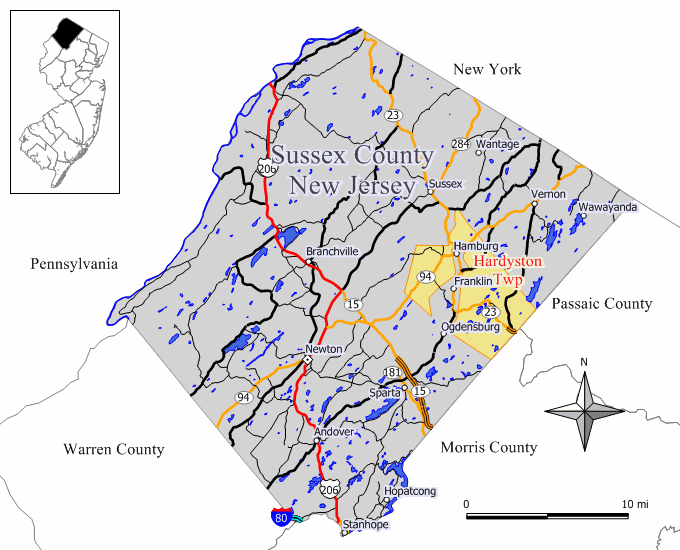
- Map of Hardyston Township in Sussex County. Inset: Location of Sussex County highlighted in the State of New Jersey.

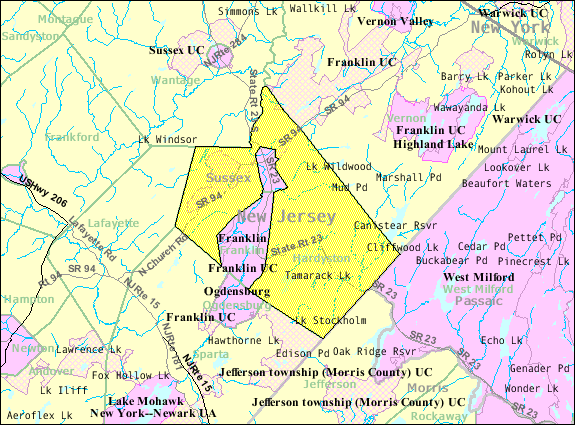
- Census Bureau map of Hardyston Township, New Jersey

- Location in Sussex County Location in New Jersey Location in the United States
- Coordinates: 41.124751°N 74.558783°W
- Country: United States
- State: New Jersey
- County: Sussex
- Royal charter: February 25, 1762
- Incorporated: February 21, 1798
- Named for: Josiah Hardy

Government
  - Type: Special charter
  - Body: Township Council
  - Mayor: Brian Kaminski (R, term ends December 31, 2024)
  - Manager: Carrine Piccolo-Kaufer
  - Municipal clerk: Jane Bakalarczyk

Area
  - Total: 32.65 sq mi (84.56 km^{2})
  - Land: 31.98 sq mi (82.84 km^{2})
  - Water: 0.66 sq mi (1.72 km^{2}) 2.03%
  - Rank: 74th of 565 in state 7th of 24 in county
- Elevation: 1,070 ft (330 m)

Population (2020)
  - Total: 8,125
  - Estimate (2023): 8,409
  - Rank: 289th of 565 in state 6th of 24 in county
  - Density: 254/sq mi (98/km^{2})
  - Rank: 489th of 565 in state 14th of 24 in county
- Time zone: UTC−05:00 (Eastern (EST))
  - Summer (DST): UTC−04:00 (Eastern (EDT))
- ZIP Code: 07419 – Hamburg; 07460 – Stockholm
- Area code: 973
- FIPS code: 3403729850
- GNIS feature ID: 0882269
- Website: www.hardyston.com

Hardyston Township is a township in Sussex County, in the U.S. state of New Jersey. As of the 2020 United States census, the township's population was 8,125, a decrease of 88 (−1.1%) from the 2010 census count of 8,213, which in turn reflected an increase of 2,042 (+33.1%) from the 6,171 counted in the 2000 census.

== History ==
Hardyston Township was set off from portions of Newton Township by Royal charter on February 25, 1762. It was named after Josiah Hardy, who was royal governor of New Jersey from 1761 to 1763. The original British spelling of Hardiston was Americanized to Hardyston after the American Revolutionary War.

Hardyston was incorporated on February 21, 1798, by an act of the New Jersey Legislature as one of New Jersey's original group of 104 townships. Over the centuries, portions of the township were taken to form Vernon Township (April 8, 1793), Sparta (April 14, 1845), Franklin (March 18, 1913) and Hamburg (March 19, 1920).

Hardyston was serviced first by the New Jersey Midland Railway, which built the station in Stockholm. However, there was a dispute over the name as that area was known as Snufftown because of the snuff factory along the Pequannock River, which provide the water power. Through a series of events between the residents of Stockholm and the railroad, the area eventually changed the name from Snufftown to Stockholm. Later, it was the New York, Susquehanna and Western Railway, who provided service into the early 1960s when a mud slide removed a large section of trackage in West Milford Township and coupled with low productivity, the line was not repaired and service was disconnected. Today, the New York Susquehanna and Western Railway runs freight through Hardyston. The main highways are Route 23 and Route 94.

A large eastern portion of the township is owned by the City of Newark, Essex County, for their Pequannock River Watershed, which provides water to the city from an area of 35,000 acres (14,000 ha) that also includes portions of Jefferson Township, Kinnelon, Rockaway Township, Vernon Township and West Milford.

=== Cemetery ===
The township contains North Church Cemetery / North Hardyston Cemetery. Notable burials there include:

- Samuel Fowler (1779–1844), who served in the House of Representatives from 1833 to 1837.
- Samuel Fowler (1851–1919), represented New Jersey's 4th congressional district from 1893 to 1895.
- Daniel Haines (1801–1877) 14th Governor of New Jersey, from 1843 to 1845, and from 1848 to 1851.
- John Linn (1763–1821) was a U.S. Representative from New Jersey from 1817 to 1821.

== Geography ==
According to the United States Census Bureau, the township had a total area of 32.65 square miles (84.56 km^{2}), including 31.99 square miles (82.84 km^{2}) of land and 0.66 square miles (1.72 km^{2}) of water (2.03%).

Unincorporated communities, localities and place names located partially or completely within the township include Beaver Lake, Beaver Run, Big Springs, Bradys Pond, Hamburg, Hardistonville, Holland, Lake Stockholm, Monroe, North Church, Rudeville, Rudstown, Silver Lake, Stockholm, Summit Lake and Tamarack Lake.

Postal ZIP Codes covering Hardyston Township include 07460 Stockholm, 07416 Franklin Borough, 07419 Hamburg Borough, and a small part of 07848 Lafayette Township.

The township borders the municipalities of Franklin, Hamburg, Lafayette Township, Ogdensburg, Sparta, Vernon Township and Wantage Township in Sussex County; Jefferson Township in Morris County; and West Milford in Passaic County.

In terms of physical geography, nearly all of Hardyston (excluding the portion of the township west of Hamburg along Route 94) lies within the New York – New Jersey Highlands, part of the greater Crystalline Appalachians that extend as far south as the Blue Ridge Mountains. Hardyston is home to portions of Hamburg Mountain (east of Franklin) and Pochuck Mountain (near Scenic Lakes) within this region. The remaining northwestern portion of the township lies within the Ridge-and-valley Appalachians. The prominent feature in the ridge-and-valley portion of the Township is the Wallkill Valley, through which the Wallkill River flows northeast to New York state.

== Demographics ==
Historical population
Census	Pop.	Note	%±
1810	1,702		—
1820	2,160		26.9%
1830	2,588		19.8%
1840	2,831		9.4%
1850	1,344	*	−52.5%
1860	1,712		27.4%
1870	1,668		−2.6%
1880	2,645		58.6%
1890	2,542		−3.9%
1900	3,425		34.7%
1910	5,210		52.1%
1920	1,928	*	−63.0%
1930	946	*	−50.9%
1940	1,034		9.3%
1950	1,279		23.7%
1960	2,206		72.5%
1970	3,499		58.6%
1980	4,553		30.1%
1990	5,275		15.9%
2000	6,171		17.0%
2010	8,213		33.1%
2020	8,125		−1.1%
2023 (est.)	8,409		3.5%
Population sources: 1810–1920 1840; 1850–1870 1850 1870; 1880–1890 1890–1910 1910–1930; 1940–2000 2000; 2010 2020 * = Lost territory in previous decade.

=== 2010 census ===
The 2010 United States census counted 8,213 people, 3,255 households, and 2,376 families in the township. The population density was 256.9 per square mile (99.2/km^{2}). There were 3,783 housing units at an average density of 118.3 per square mile (45.7/km^{2}). The racial makeup was 91.65% (7,527) White, 2.61% (214) Black or African American, 0.17% (14) Native American, 3.01% (247) Asian, 0.01% (1) Pacific Islander, 1.21% (99) from other races, and 1.35% (111) from two or more races. Hispanic or Latino of any race were 5.56% (457) of the population.

Of the 3,255 households, 28.9% had children under the age of 18; 59.9% were married couples living together; 9.3% had a female householder with no husband present and 27.0% were non-families. Of all households, 22.1% were made up of individuals and 7.4% had someone living alone who was 65 years of age or older. The average household size was 2.52 and the average family size was 2.97.

21.3% of the population were under the age of 18, 6.5% from 18 to 24, 24.8% from 25 to 44, 32.8% from 45 to 64, and 14.5% who were 65 years of age or older. The median age was 43.4 years. For every 100 females, the population had 94.5 males. For every 100 females ages 18 and older there were 93.2 males.

The Census Bureau's 2006–2010 American Community Survey showed that (in 2010 inflation-adjusted dollars) median household income was $81,655 (with a margin of error of +/− $6,575) and the median family income was $93,657 (+/− $14,035). Males had a median income of $70,592 (+/− $9,771) versus $42,899 (+/− $4,944) for females. The per capita income for the borough was $38,383 (+/− $2,894). About 3.5% of families and 6.6% of the population were below the poverty line, including 7.3% of those under age 18 and 10.4% of those age 65 or over.

=== 2000 census ===
As of the 2000 United States census there were 6,171 people, 2,319 households, and 1,716 families residing in the township. The population density was 192.3 inhabitants per square mile (74.2/km^{2}). There were 2,690 housing units at an average density of 83.8 per square mile (32.4/km^{2}). The racial makeup of the township was 95.56% White, 0.84% African American, 0.16% Native American, 1.57% Asian, 0.49% from other races, and 1.38% from two or more races. Hispanic or Latino of any race were 3.22% of the population.

There were 2,319 households, out of which 35.3% had children under the age of 18 living with them, 62.4% were married couples living together, 7.9% had a female householder with no husband present, and 26.0% were non-families. 21.6% of all households were made up of individuals, and 6.8% had someone living alone who was 65 years of age or older. The average household size was 2.66 and the average family size was 3.12.

In the township the population was spread out, with 25.7% under the age of 18, 5.4% from 18 to 24, 31.9% from 25 to 44, 26.8% from 45 to 64, and 10.2% who were 65 years of age or older. The median age was 38 years. For every 100 females, there were 97.0 males. For every 100 females age 18 and over, there were 95.7 males.

The median income for a household in the township was $65,511, and the median income for a family was $72,199. Males had a median income of $51,503 versus $32,319 for females. The per capita income for the township was $28,457. About 2.7% of families and 4.7% of the population were below the poverty line, including 4.9% of those under age 18 and 5.6% of those age 65 or over.

== Government ==
=== Local government ===
Hardyston Township operates under a special charter granted by the New Jersey Legislature. The township is one of 11 municipalities (of the 564) statewide that use a special charter. The governing body is comprised of the five-member Township Council, whose members are elected at-large in partisan elections to serve three-year terms of office on a staggered basis, with either one or two seats coming up for election each year as part of the November general election. At an annual reorganization meeting held in the first week of January, the council selects a mayor and a deputy mayor from among its members.

As of 2024, the members of the Hardyston Township Council are Mayor Frank Cicerale (R, term on committee ends December 31, 2026; term as mayor ends 2025), Deputy Mayor Brian J. Kaminski (R, term on committee ends 2026; term as deputy mayor ends 2024), Stanley J. Kula (R, 2025), Carl B. Miller (R, 2024) and Santo Verrilli (R, 2025).

=== Federal, state and county representation ===
Hardyston Township is located in the 5th Congressional District and is part of New Jersey's 24th state legislative district.

For the 119th United States Congress, New Jersey's 5th congressional district is represented by Josh Gottheimer (D, Wyckoff). New Jersey is represented in the United States Senate by Democrats Cory Booker (Newark, term ends 2027) and Andy Kim (Moorestown, term ends 2031).

For the 2026–2027 session, the 24th legislative district of the New Jersey Legislature is represented in the State Senate by Parker Space (R, Wantage Township) and in the General Assembly by Dawn Fantasia (R, Franklin) and Mike Inganamort (R, Chester Township).

Sussex County is governed by a Board of County Commissioners whose five members are elected at-large in partisan elections on a staggered basis, with either one or two seats coming up for election each year. At an annual reorganization meeting held in the beginning of January, the board selects a Commissioner Director and Deputy Director from among its members, with day-to-day supervision of the operation of the county delegated to a County Administrator. As of 2025, Sussex County's Commissioners are Director Jill Space (R, Wantage Township, 2025), Deputy Director Chris Carney (R, Frankford Township, 2027), Jack DeGroot (R, Sussex, 2026), William Hayden (I, Branchville, 2025) and Alan Henderson (R, Lafayette Township, 2027).

Constitutional officers elected on a countywide basis are Clerk Jeffrey M. Parrott (R, Wantage Township, 2026), Sheriff Michael F. Strada (R, Hampton Township, 2025) and Surrogate Gary R. Chiusano (R, Frankford Township, 2028).

=== Politics ===
As of March 2011, there were a total of 5,487 registered voters in Hardyston Township, of which 870 (15.9% vs. 16.5% countywide) were registered as Democrats, 1,962 (35.8% vs. 39.3%) were registered as Republicans and 2,652 (48.3% vs. 44.1%) were registered as Unaffiliated. There were 3 voters registered as Libertarians or Greens. Among the township's 2010 Census population, 66.8% (vs. 65.8% in Sussex County) were registered to vote, including 84.9% of those ages 18 and over (vs. 86.5% countywide).

Gubernatorial election results for Hardyston Township
Year	Republican		Democratic		Third party(ies)	
Year	No.	%	No.	%	No.	%
2025	2,360	57.21%	1,738	42.13%	27	0.65%
2021	2,100	65.81%	1,053	33.00%	38	1.19%
2017	1,384	58.20%	911	38.31%	83	3.49%
2013	1,565	70.59%	583	26.30%	69	3.11%
2009	1,637	62.39%	753	28.70%	234	8.92%
2005	1,236	58.06%	798	37.48%	95	4.46%

In the 2012 presidential election, Republican Mitt Romney received 2,186 votes (57.8% vs. 59.4% countywide), ahead of Democrat Barack Obama with 1,531 votes (40.5% vs. 38.2%) and other candidates with 55 votes (1.5% vs. 2.1%), among the 3,782 ballots cast by the township's 5,658 registered voters, for a turnout of 66.8% (vs. 68.3% in Sussex County). In the 2008 presidential election, Republican John McCain received 2,325 votes (57.2% vs. 59.2% countywide), ahead of Democrat Barack Obama with 1,654 votes (40.7% vs. 38.7%) and other candidates with 65 votes (1.6% vs. 1.5%), among the 4,062 ballots cast by the township's 5,304 registered voters, for a turnout of 76.6% (vs. 76.9% in Sussex County). In the 2004 presidential election, Republican George W. Bush received 2,194 votes (62.3% vs. 63.9% countywide), ahead of Democrat John Kerry with 1,279 votes (36.3% vs. 34.4%) and other candidates with 34 votes (1.0% vs. 1.3%), among the 3,522 ballots cast by the township's 4,507 registered voters, for a turnout of 78.1% (vs. 77.7% in the whole county).

United States presidential election results for Hardyston Township 2024 2020 2016 2012 2008 2004
Year	Republican		Democratic		Third party(ies)	
Year	No.	%	No.	%	No.	%
2024	3,160	60.61%	1,971	37.80%	83	1.59%
2020	3,137	59.01%	2,087	39.26%	92	1.73%
2016	2,687	62.66%	1,441	33.61%	160	3.73%
2012	2,186	57.95%	1,531	40.59%	55	1.46%
2008	2,325	57.49%	1,654	40.90%	65	1.61%
2004	2,194	62.56%	1,279	36.47%	34	0.97%

In the 2013 gubernatorial election, Republican Chris Christie received 70.6% of the vote (1,565 cast), ahead of Democrat Barbara Buono with 26.3% (583 votes), and other candidates with 3.1% (69 votes), among the 2,227 ballots cast by the township's 5,686 registered voters (10 ballots were spoiled), for a turnout of 39.2%. In the 2009 gubernatorial election, Republican Chris Christie received 1,637 votes (62.2% vs. 63.3% countywide), ahead of Democrat Jon Corzine with 753 votes (28.6% vs. 25.7%), Independent Chris Daggett with 205 votes (7.8% vs. 9.1%) and other candidates with 29 votes (1.1% vs. 1.3%), among the 2,633 ballots cast by the township's 5,287 registered voters, yielding a 49.8% turnout (vs. 52.3% in the county).

United States Senate election results for Hardyston Township1
Year	Republican		Democratic		Third party(ies)	
Year	No.	%	No.	%	No.	%
2024	3,037	59.88%	1,907	37.60%	128	2.52%
2018	2,216	60.96%	1,268	34.88%	151	4.15%
2012	2,071	56.62%	1,478	40.40%	109	2.98%
2006	1,331	60.64%	795	36.22%	69	3.14%

United States Senate election results for Hardyston Township2
Year	Republican		Democratic		Third party(ies)	
Year	No.	%	No.	%	No.	%
2020	3,037	58.14%	2,061	39.45%	126	2.41%
2014	1,281	62.37%	732	35.64%	41	2.00%
2013	950	63.16%	536	35.64%	18	1.20%
2008	2,208	56.25%	1,584	40.36%	133	3.39%

== Education ==
Public school students in pre-kindergarten through eighth grade attend the schools of the Hardyston Township School District. As of the 2020–21 school year, the district, comprised of two schools, had an enrollment of 593 students and 57.0 classroom teachers (on an FTE basis), for a student–teacher ratio of 10.4:1. Schools in the district (with 2020–21 enrollment data from the National Center for Education Statistics) are Hardyston Township School with 318 students in grades Pre-K–5 and Hardyston Middle School with 274 students in grades 6–8.

For ninth through twelfth grades, public school students attend Wallkill Valley Regional High School which also serves students from Franklin Borough, Hamburg Borough and Ogdensburg Borough, and is part of the Wallkill Valley Regional High School District. As of the 2020–21 school year, the high school had an enrollment of 590 students and 52.2 classroom teachers (on an FTE basis), for a student–teacher ratio of 11.3:1. Seats on the high school district's nine-member board of education are allocated based on the populations of the constituent municipalities, with four seats assigned to Hardyston Township.

== Transportation ==
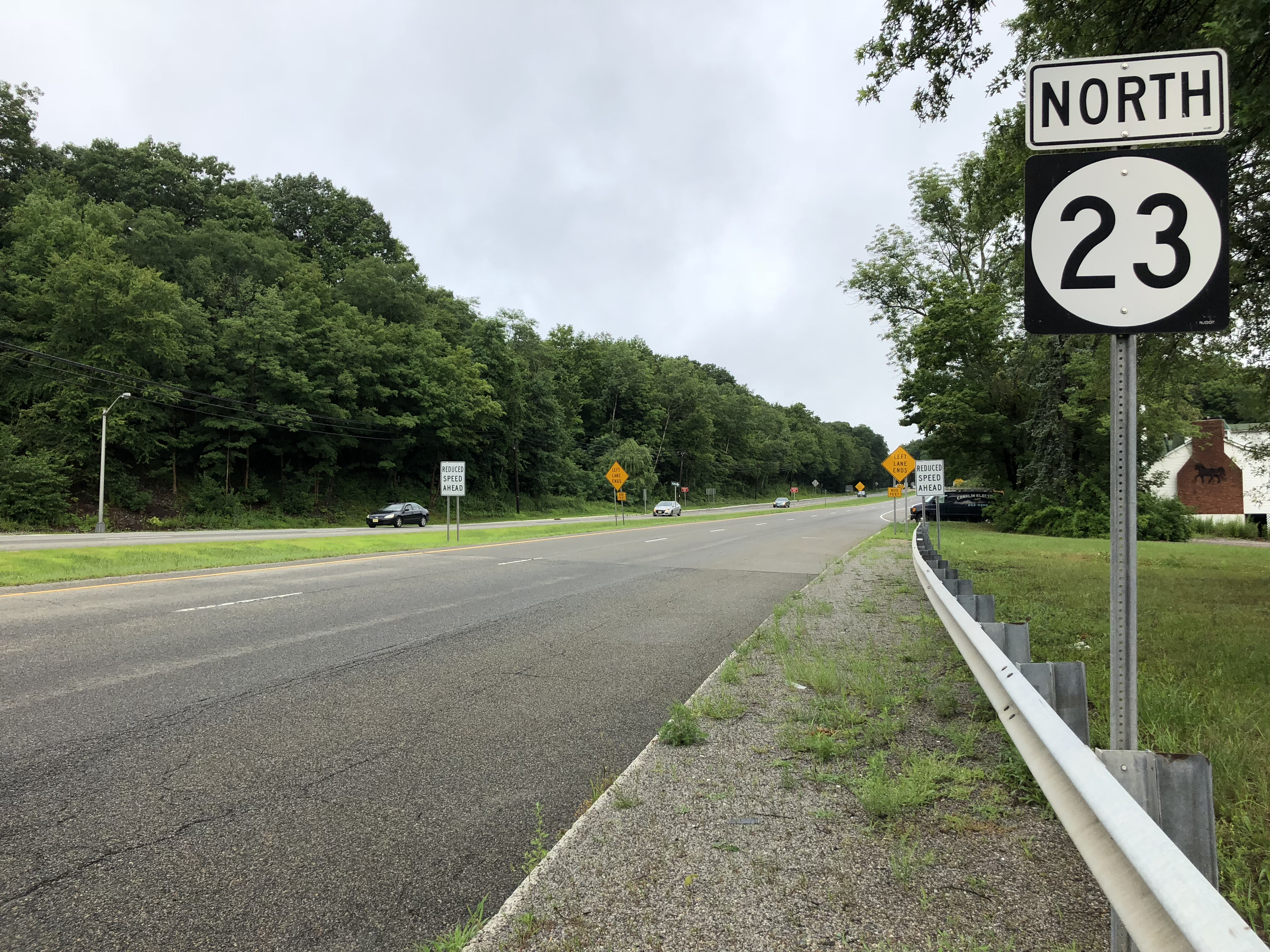
Route 23 northbound in Hardyston Township

As of May 2010, the township had a total of 63.53 miles (102.24 km) of roadways, of which 44.23 miles (71.18 km) were maintained by the municipality, 8.71 miles (14.02 km) by Sussex County and 10.59 miles (17.04 km) by the New Jersey Department of Transportation.

Route 23 and Route 94 are the main highways serving Hardyston Township. County Route 515 and County Route 517 also traverse the township.

== Wineries ==
- Cava Winery & Vineyard

== Notable people ==
People who were born in, residents of, or otherwise closely associated with Hardyston Township include:

- A. L. A. Himmelwright (1865–1936), a civil engineer, author, adventurer and marksman who was the general manager of The Roebling Construction Company
- Christopher Sieber (born 1969), actor best known for his roles as Kevin Burke in Two of a Kind starring Mary-Kate Olsen and Ashley Olsen, and Lord Farquaad in Shrek the Musical
