= Franklin, New Jersey =

Borough in Sussex County, New Jersey, US

- Borough
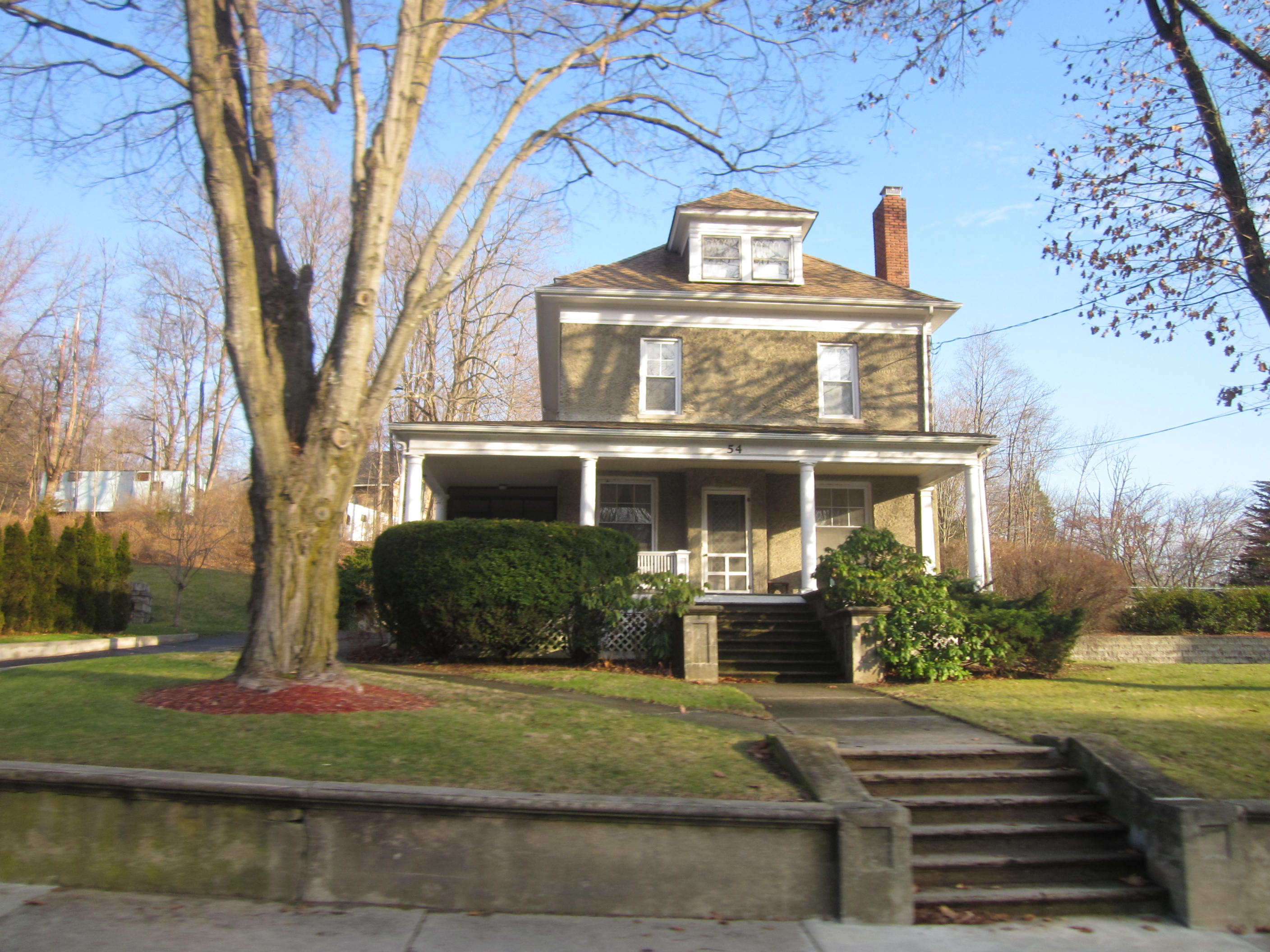
- House in Franklin

- Seal
- Nickname: Fluorescent Mineral Capital of the World
- Location of Franklin in Sussex County highlighted in red (left). Inset map: Location of Sussex County in New Jersey highlighted in orange (right).

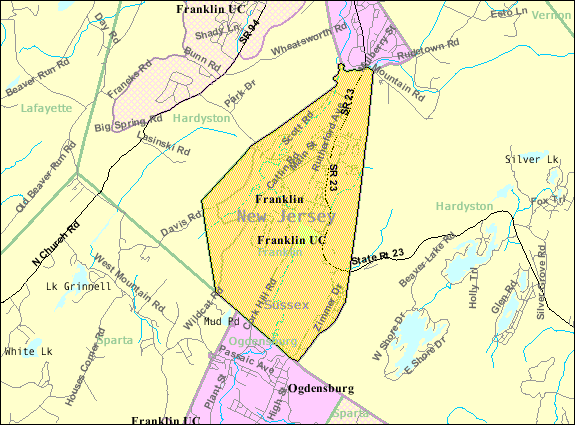
- Census Bureau map of Franklin, New Jersey

- Location in Sussex County Location in New Jersey Location in the United States
- Coordinates: 41.108997°N 74.588641°W
- Country: United States
- State: New Jersey
- County: Sussex
- Incorporated: April 23, 1913
- Named for: Benjamin Franklin

Government
  - Type: Borough
  - Body: Borough Council
  - Mayor: John M. Sowden IV (R, term ends December 31, 2027)
  - Administrator: Vacant
  - Municipal clerk: Darlene J. Tremont

Area
  - Total: 4.43 sq mi (11.47 km^{2})
  - Land: 4.36 sq mi (11.28 km^{2})
  - Water: 0.073 sq mi (0.19 km^{2}) 1.60%
  - Rank: 284th of 565 in state 17th of 24 in county
- Elevation: 541 ft (165 m)

Population (2020)
  - Total: 4,912
  - Estimate (2023): 5,008
  - Rank: 378th of 565 in state 10th of 24 in county
  - Density: 1,127.6/sq mi (435.4/km^{2})
  - Rank: 369th of 565 in state 7th of 24 in county
- Time zone: UTC−05:00 (Eastern (EST))
  - Summer (DST): UTC−04:00 (Eastern (EDT))
- ZIP Code: 07416
- Area code: 973 exchanges: 209, 823, 827
- FIPS code: 3403724930
- GNIS feature ID: 0885224
- Website: www.franklinborough.org

Franklin is a borough in Sussex County, in the U.S. state of New Jersey. As of the 2020 United States census, the borough's population was 4,912, a decrease of 133 (−2.6%) from the 2010 census count of 5,045, which in turn reflected a decline of 115 (−2.2%) from the 5,160 counted in the 2000 census.

Franklin, known as the "Fluorescent Mineral Capital of the World," is located over a rich ore body containing more than 150 minerals, many of them fluorescent and 25 of which are found nowhere else on earth. Settled in the 17th century, the village known as Franklin Furnace after Benjamin Franklin, developed near iron mines and iron smelting operations located along the Wallkill River. In the early 19th century, zinc deposits in the area began to be developed commercially. For most of the century many small companies mined zinc and iron in the Franklin area. In 1897 all zinc mining efforts merged into the New Jersey Zinc Company, which was a major controlling factor in the development of Franklin. Immigrants from Russia, Britain, Hungary and Poland joined the work force at the mine. The population, 500 in 1897, had swelled to 3,000 by 1913. On March 18, 1913, the Borough of Franklin was incorporated from portions of Hardyston Township, based on the results of a referendum held on April 23, 1913.

== Geography ==
According to the United States Census Bureau, the borough had a total area of 4.43 square miles (11.47 km^{2}), including 4.36 square miles (11.28 km^{2}) of land and 0.07 square miles (0.19 km^{2}) of water (1.60%).

The borough borders the boroughs of Hamburg and Ogdensburg, as well as Sparta and Hardyston townships.

Franklin Furnace provides many examples of the complex mineralogy of the area.

== Demographics ==
Historical population
Census	Pop.	Note	%±
1920	4,075		—
1930	4,176		2.5%
1940	4,009		−4.0%
1950	3,864		−3.6%
1960	3,624		−6.2%
1970	4,236		16.9%
1980	4,486		5.9%
1990	4,977		10.9%
2000	5,160		3.7%
2010	5,045		−2.2%
2020	4,912		−2.6%
2023 (est.)	5,008	▲	2.0%
Population sources: 1920 1920–1930; 1940–2000 2000; 2010 2020

=== 2020 census ===
As of the 2020 census, Franklin had a population of 4,912. The median age was 45.8 years. 19.0% of residents were under the age of 18 and 19.1% were 65 years of age or older. For every 100 females there were 92.4 males, and for every 100 females age 18 and over there were 90.2 males age 18 and over.

86.2% of residents lived in urban areas, while 13.8% lived in rural areas.

There were 2,047 households, of which 25.5% had children under the age of 18 living in them. Of all households, 42.2% were married-couple households, 19.9% were households with a male householder and no spouse or partner present, and 30.1% were households with a female householder and no spouse or partner present. About 31.5% of all households were made up of individuals and 16.1% had someone living alone who was 65 years of age or older.

There were 2,177 housing units, of which 6.0% were vacant. The homeowner vacancy rate was 2.4% and the rental vacancy rate was 6.9%.

Racial composition as of the 2020 census
Race	Number	Percent
White	3,970	80.8%
Black or African American	116	2.4%
American Indian and Alaska Native	15	0.3%
Asian	79	1.6%
Native Hawaiian and Other Pacific Islander	8	0.2%
Some other race	235	4.8%
Two or more races	489	10.0%
Hispanic or Latino (of any race)	661	13.5%

=== 2010 census ===
The 2010 United States census counted 5,045 people, 1,936 households, and 1,316 families in the borough. The population density was 1,121.6 per square mile (433.1/km^{2}). There were 2,136 housing units at an average density of 474.9 per square mile (183.4/km^{2}). The racial makeup was 92.15% (4,649) White, 2.18% (110) Black or African American, 0.30% (15) Native American, 1.74% (88) Asian, 0.00% (0) Pacific Islander, 1.23% (62) from other races, and 2.40% (121) from two or more races. Hispanic or Latino of any race were 7.83% (395) of the population.

Of the 1,936 households, 28.7% had children under the age of 18; 49.7% were married couples living together; 13.5% had a female householder with no husband present and 32.0% were non-families. Of all households, 26.7% were made up of individuals and 9.7% had someone living alone who was 65 years of age or older. The average household size was 2.59 and the average family size was 3.15.

22.2% of the population were under the age of 18, 9.1% from 18 to 24, 24.2% from 25 to 44, 31.5% from 45 to 64, and 13.1% who were 65 years of age or older. The median age was 41.3 years. For every 100 females, the population had 94.0 males. For every 100 females ages 18 and older there were 93.1 males.

The Census Bureau's 2006–2010 American Community Survey showed that (in 2010 inflation-adjusted dollars) median household income was $62,813 (with a margin of error of +/− $7,585) and the median family income was $81,875 (+/− $11,964). Males had a median income of $49,413 (+/− $8,152) versus $45,385 (+/− $9,926) for females. The per capita income for the borough was $29,708 (+/− $2,344). About 5.1% of families and 6.5% of the population were below the poverty line, including 6.4% of those under age 18 and 6.7% of those age 65 or over.

=== 2000 census ===
As of the 2000 United States census there were 5,160 people, 1,898 households, and 1,324 families residing in the borough. The population density was 1,150.2 inhabitants per square mile (444.1/km^{2}). There were 1,997 housing units at an average density of 445.1 per square mile (171.9/km^{2}). The racial makeup of the borough was 95.10% White, 0.62% African American, 0.35% Native American, 1.47% Asian, 1.22% from other races, and 1.24% from two or more races. Hispanic or Latino of any race were 4.42% of the population.

There were 1,898 households, out of which 36.0% had children under the age of 18 living with them, 53.8% were married couples living together, 11.7% had a female householder with no husband present, and 30.2% were non-families. 24.1% of all households were made up of individuals, and 11.3% had someone living alone who was 65 years of age or older. The average household size was 2.69 and the average family size was 3.22.

In the borough the age distribution of the population shows 27.5% under the age of 18, 7.3% from 18 to 24, 31.8% from 25 to 44, 21.7% from 45 to 64, and 11.7% who were 65 years of age or older. The median age was 37 years. For every 100 females, there were 90.0 males. For every 100 females age 18 and over, there were 86.9 males.

The median income for a household in the borough was $44,985, and the median income for a family was $52,682. Males had a median income of $41,080 versus $26,201 for females. The per capita income for the borough was $19,386. About 5.6% of families and 7.0% of the population were below the poverty line, including 10.1% of those under age 18 and 9.9% of those age 65 or over.

== Government ==
=== Local government ===
Franklin is governed under the borough form of New Jersey municipal government, which is used in 218 municipalities (of the 564) statewide, making it the most common form of government in New Jersey. The governing body is comprised of the mayor and the borough council, with all positions elected at-large on a partisan basis as part of the November general election. The mayor is elected directly by the voters to a four-year term of office. The borough council includes six members elected to serve three-year terms on a staggered basis, with two seats coming up for election each year in a three-year cycle. The borough form of government used by Franklin is a "weak mayor / strong council" government in which council members act as the legislative body with the mayor presiding at meetings and voting only in the event of a tie. The mayor can veto ordinances subject to an override by a two-thirds majority vote of the council. The mayor makes committee and liaison assignments for council members, and most appointments are made by the mayor with the advice and consent of the council.

As of 2024, the mayor of Franklin Borough is Republican John M. Sowden IV, whose term of office ends December 31, 2027. Members of the Borough Council are Concetto Formica (R, 2025), Rachel Heath (R, 2024), Joseph Limon (R, 2026), John E. Postas (R, 2026), Stephen M. Skellenger (R, 2025) and Gilbert J. Snyder (R, 2024).

=== Federal, state and county representation ===
Franklin is located in the 5th Congressional District and is part of New Jersey's 24th state legislative district.

For the 119th United States Congress, New Jersey's 5th congressional district is represented by Josh Gottheimer (D, Wyckoff). New Jersey is represented in the United States Senate by Democrats Cory Booker (Newark, term ends 2027) and Andy Kim (Moorestown, term ends 2031).

For the 2026–2027 session, the 24th legislative district of the New Jersey Legislature is represented in the State Senate by Parker Space (R, Wantage Township) and in the General Assembly by Dawn Fantasia (R, Franklin) and Mike Inganamort (R, Chester Township).

Sussex County is governed by a Board of County Commissioners whose five members are elected at-large in partisan elections on a staggered basis, with either one or two seats coming up for election each year. At an annual reorganization meeting held in the beginning of January, the board selects a Commissioner Director and Deputy Director from among its members, with day-to-day supervision of the operation of the county delegated to a County Administrator. As of 2025, Sussex County's Commissioners are Director Jill Space (R, Wantage Township, 2025), Deputy Director Chris Carney (R, Frankford Township, 2027), Jack DeGroot (R, Sussex, 2026), William Hayden (I, Branchville, 2025) and Alan Henderson (R, Lafayette Township, 2027).

Constitutional officers elected on a countywide basis are Clerk Jeffrey M. Parrott (R, Wantage Township, 2026), Sheriff Michael F. Strada (R, Hampton Township, 2025) and Surrogate Gary R. Chiusano (R, Frankford Township, 2028).

=== Politics ===
As of March 2011, there were a total of 3,071 registered voters in Franklin, of which 469 (15.3% vs. 16.5% countywide) were registered as Democrats, 1,302 (42.4% vs. 39.3%) were registered as Republicans and 1,296 (42.2% vs. 44.1%) were registered as Unaffiliated. There were 4 voters registered as Libertarians or Greens. Among the borough's 2010 Census population, 60.9% (vs. 65.8% in Sussex County) were registered to vote, including 78.2% of those ages 18 and over (vs. 86.5% countywide).

Gubernatorial election results for Franklin
Year	Republican		Democratic		Third party(ies)	
Year	No.	%	No.	%	No.	%
2025	1,045	57.23%	768	42.06%	13	0.71%
2021	1,000	66.45%	487	32.36%	18	1.20%
2017	755	60.84%	417	33.60%	69	5.56%
2013	841	68.60%	339	27.65%	46	3.75%
2009	870	63.36%	361	26.29%	142	10.34%
2005	647	56.51%	434	37.90%	64	5.59%

In the 2012 presidential election, Republican Mitt Romney received 1,121 votes (57.2% vs. 59.4% countywide), ahead of Democrat Barack Obama with 772 votes (39.4% vs. 38.2%) and other candidates with 58 votes (3.0% vs. 2.1%), among the 1,959 ballots cast by the borough's 3,095 registered voters, for a turnout of 63.3% (vs. 68.3% in Sussex County). In the 2008 presidential election, Republican John McCain received 1,213 votes (57.2% vs. 59.2% countywide), ahead of Democrat Barack Obama with 857 votes (40.4% vs. 38.7%) and other candidates with 37 votes (1.7% vs. 1.5%), among the 2,122 ballots cast by the borough's 2,930 registered voters, for a turnout of 72.4% (vs. 76.9% in Sussex County). In the 2004 presidential election, Republican George W. Bush received 1,269 votes (63.4% vs. 63.9% countywide), ahead of Democrat John Kerry with 695 votes (34.7% vs. 34.4%) and other candidates with 28 votes (1.4% vs. 1.3%), among the 2,001 ballots cast by the borough's 2,740 registered voters, for a turnout of 73.0% (vs. 77.7% in the whole county).

United States presidential election results for Franklin 2024 2020 2016 2012 2008 2004
Year	Republican		Democratic		Third party(ies)	
Year	No.	%	No.	%	No.	%
2024	1,489	61.33%	894	36.82%	45	1.85%
2020	1,558	60.34%	974	37.72%	50	1.94%
2016	1,375	63.86%	680	31.58%	98	4.55%
2012	1,121	57.46%	772	39.57%	58	2.97%
2008	1,213	57.57%	857	40.67%	37	1.76%
2004	1,269	63.70%	695	34.89%	28	1.41%

In the 2013 gubernatorial election, Republican Chris Christie received 68.6% of the vote (841 cast), ahead of Democrat Barbara Buono with 27.7% (339 votes), and other candidates with 3.8% (46 votes), among the 1,242 ballots cast by the borough's 3,134 registered voters (16 ballots were spoiled), for a turnout of 39.6%. In the 2009 gubernatorial election, Republican Chris Christie received 870 votes (63.0% vs. 63.3% countywide), ahead of Democrat Jon Corzine with 361 votes (26.1% vs. 25.7%), Independent Chris Daggett with 116 votes (8.4% vs. 9.1%) and other candidates with 26 votes (1.9% vs. 1.3%), among the 1,382 ballots cast by the borough's 2,936 registered voters, yielding a 47.1% turnout (vs. 52.3% in the county).

United States Senate election results for Franklin1
Year	Republican		Democratic		Third party(ies)	
Year	No.	%	No.	%	No.	%
2024	1,400	59.65%	870	37.07%	77	3.28%
2018	1,089	63.76%	514	30.09%	105	6.15%
2012	1,060	55.64%	751	39.42%	94	4.93%
2006	703	58.53%	436	36.30%	62	5.16%

United States Senate election results for Franklin2
Year	Republican		Democratic		Third party(ies)	
Year	No.	%	No.	%	No.	%
2020	1,492	58.83%	974	38.41%	70	2.76%
2014	604	61.07%	356	36.00%	29	2.93%
2013	449	65.74%	224	32.80%	10	1.46%
2008	1,142	55.73%	799	38.99%	108	5.27%

== Education ==
Students in public school for pre-kindergarten through eighth grade attend the Franklin Borough School District. As of the 2023–24 school year, the district, comprised of one school, had an enrollment of 507 students and 49.0 classroom teachers (on an FTE basis), for a student–teacher ratio of 10.4:1.

For ninth through twelfth grades, public school students attend Wallkill Valley Regional High School which also serves students from Hardyston Township, Hamburg Borough and Ogdensburg Borough, and is part of the Wallkill Valley Regional High School District. As of the 2023–24 school year, the high school had an enrollment of 617 students and 48.3 classroom teachers (on an FTE basis), for a student–teacher ratio of 12.8:1. Seats on the high school district's nine-member board of education are allocated based on the populations of the constituent municipalities, with two seats assigned to Franklin.

== Transportation ==
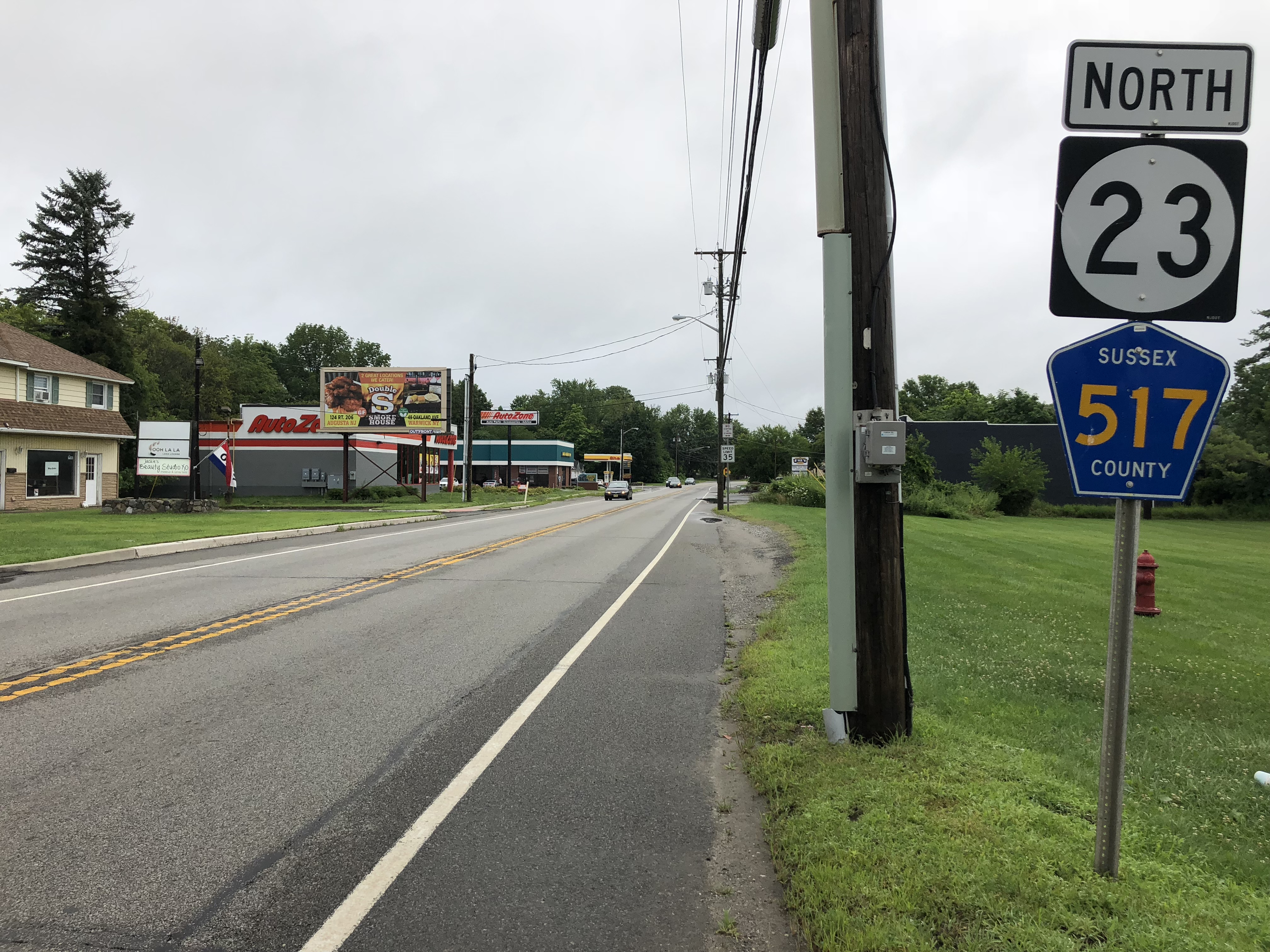
Route 23 and County Route 517 northbound in Franklin

=== Roads and highways ===
As of May 2010, the borough had a total of 26.87 miles (43.24 km) of roadways, of which 21.00 miles (33.80 km) were maintained by the municipality, 2.93 miles (4.72 km) by Sussex County and 2.94 miles (4.73 km) by the New Jersey Department of Transportation.

The main highway providing service to Franklin is Route 23. County Route 517 also traverses the borough, mostly concurrent with Route 23.

=== Public transportation ===
The county provides Skylands Ride bus service operating between Sussex and Newton.

== Media ==
- WSUS is a Class A radio station with an adult contemporary format serving the Sussex County area on 102.3 FM, owned by iHeartMedia and licensed to Franklin.

== Notable people ==
People who were born in, residents of, or otherwise closely associated with Franklin include:

- Gertrude M. Clarke (1932–2020), science educator who primarily taught high school physics and nucleonics and extensively engaged in nuclear physics research.
- Alexandra Tillson Filer (1916–2015), metallurgist, mineral collector and bookseller
- Charles Joseph Fletcher (1922–2011), inventor and the owner / CEO of Technology General Corporation who developed an early version of the hovercraft
- Samuel Fowler (1779–1844), doctor, state legislator, and member of the United States House of Representatives who was one of the developers of the mines in the area
- Alfred B. Littell (1893–1970), politician who was mayor of Franklin in the 1950s, who also served as a member of both houses of the New Jersey Legislature and as President of the New Jersey Senate in 1951
- Robert Littell (1936–2014), politician, who served as a member of the New Jersey State Senate from 1992 to 2008
- Charles Francis Lynch (1884–1942), United States Attorney and a United States district court judge in New Jersey
- Alison Littell McHose (born 1965), politician who served in the New Jersey General Assembly from 2003 to 2015 until she was appointed as borough administrator
- Steve Nagy (1919–2016), pitcher who played for two MLB seasons for the Pittsburgh Pirates and Washington Senators, as part of a career that included 14 minor league seasons
- Steve Oroho (born 1958), politician who represented the 24th Legislative District in the New Jersey Senate from 2008 to 2024
