= Hamburg, New Jersey =

Borough in Sussex County, New Jersey, US

- Borough
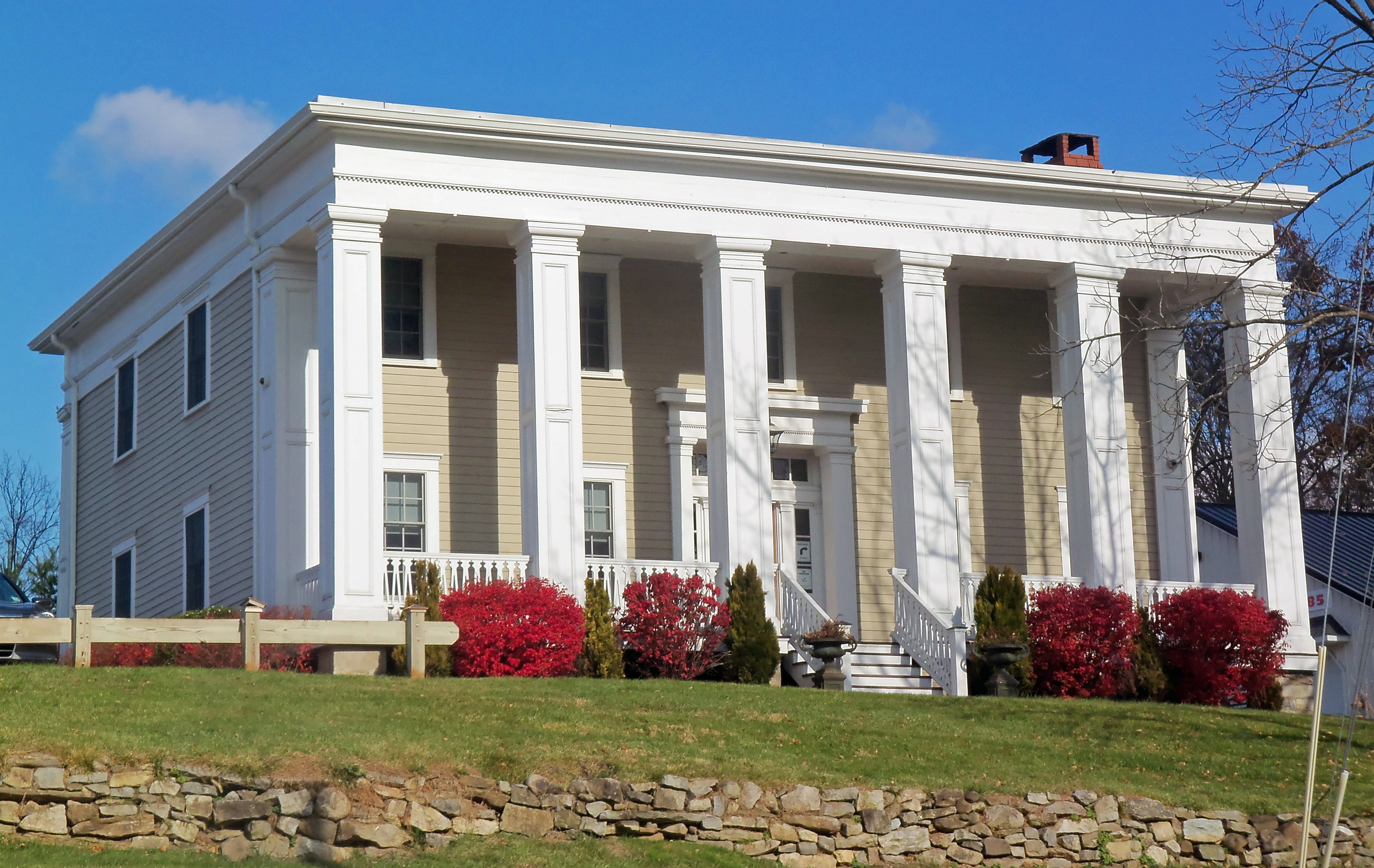
- Lawrence Mansion in Hamburg, New Jersey

- Seal

- Map of Hamburg in Sussex County. Inset: Location of Sussex County in New Jersey.

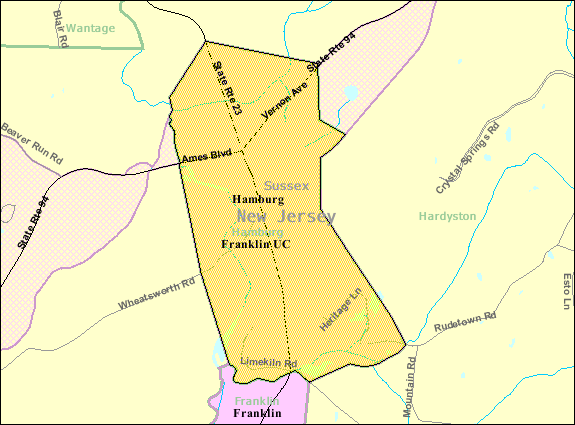
- Census Bureau map of Hamburg, New Jersey.

- Location in Sussex County Location in New Jersey Location in the United States
- Coordinates: 41.148763°N 74.573416°W
- Country: United States
- State: New Jersey
- County: Sussex
- Incorporated: April 24, 1920
- Named for: Hamburg, Germany

Government
  - Type: Borough
  - Body: Borough Council
  - Mayor: Richard Krasnomowitz (R, term ends December 31, 2026)
  - Municipal clerk: Doreen Schott

Area
  - Total: 1.17 sq mi (3.03 km^{2})
  - Land: 1.14 sq mi (2.96 km^{2})
  - Water: 0.023 sq mi (0.06 km^{2}) 2.05%
  - Rank: 491st of 565 in state 22nd of 24 in county
- Elevation: 538 ft (164 m)

Population (2020)
  - Total: 3,266
  - Estimate (2023): 3,331
  - Rank: 437th of 565 in state 16th of 24 in county
  - Density: 2,853.1/sq mi (1,101.6/km^{2})
  - Rank: 228th of 565 in state 2nd of 24 in county
- Time zone: UTC−05:00 (Eastern (EST))
  - Summer (DST): UTC−04:00 (Eastern (EDT))
- ZIP Code: 07419
- Area code: 973
- FIPS code: 3403729220
- GNIS feature ID: 885241
- Website: www.hamburgnj.org

Hamburg is a borough in Sussex County, in the U.S. state of New Jersey. As of the 2020 United States census, the borough's population was 3,266, a decrease of 11 (−0.3%) from the 2010 census count of 3,277, which in turn reflected an increase of 172 (+5.5%) from the 3,105 counted in the 2000 census. The United States Census Bureau's Population Estimates Program calculated that the population of Hamburg increased by 65 (+2.0%) to 3,331 in 2023.

In 1753, when Sussex County was formed from portions of Morris County, the area of present-day Hamburg was part of Newton Township; on February 25, 1762, it became part of the newly established Hardyston Township. On April 8, 1793, when Vernon Township was formed from Hardyston, Hamburg was included within the boundaries of Vernon. In 1852, the boundary line was changed so that Hamburg was again in Hardyston Township. Hamburg was incorporated as a borough on March 19, 1920, from portions of Hardyston Township, based on the results of a referendum held on April 24, 1920. The borough was named after Hamburg, Germany.

== Geography ==
According to the United States Census Bureau, the borough had a total area of 1.17 square miles (3.03 km^{2}), including 1.15 square miles (2.96 km^{2}) of land and 0.02 square miles (0.06 km^{2}) of water (2.05%).

Hamburg borders the Sussex County municipalities of Franklin and Hardyston Township.

== Demographics ==
Historical population
Census	Pop.	Note	%±
1880	412		—
1890	519		26.0%
1930	1,160		—
1940	1,116		−3.8%
1950	1,305		16.9%
1960	1,532		17.4%
1970	1,820		18.8%
1980	1,832		0.7%
1990	2,566		40.1%
2000	3,105		21.0%
2010	3,277		5.5%
2020	3,266		−0.3%
2023 (est.)	3,331	▲	2.0%
Population sources: 1880–1890 1930; 1940–2000 2000; 2010 2020

=== 2020 census ===
As of the 2020 census, Hamburg had a population of 3,266. The median age was 45.1 years. 17.5% of residents were under the age of 18 and 18.8% of residents were 65 years of age or older. For every 100 females there were 95.9 males, and for every 100 females age 18 and over there were 93.5 males age 18 and over.

99.7% of residents lived in urban areas, while 0.3% lived in rural areas.

There were 1,452 households in Hamburg, of which 24.4% had children under the age of 18 living in them. Of all households, 43.7% were married-couple households, 18.9% were households with a male householder and no spouse or partner present, and 29.5% were households with a female householder and no spouse or partner present. About 30.8% of all households were made up of individuals and 12.4% had someone living alone who was 65 years of age or older.

There were 1,539 housing units, of which 5.7% were vacant. The homeowner vacancy rate was 1.3% and the rental vacancy rate was 9.2%.

Racial composition as of the 2020 census
Race	Number	Percent
White	2,693	82.5%
Black or African American	101	3.1%
American Indian and Alaska Native	8	0.2%
Asian	94	2.9%
Native Hawaiian and Other Pacific Islander	0	0.0%
Some other race	86	2.6%
Two or more races	284	8.7%
Hispanic or Latino (of any race)	318	9.7%

=== 2010 census ===
The 2010 United States census counted 3,277 people, 1,364 households, and 884 families in the borough. The population density was 2,870.4 per square mile (1,108.3/km^{2}). There were 1,476 housing units at an average density of 1,292.9 per square mile (499.2/km^{2}). The racial makeup was 91.27% (2,991) White, 2.01% (66) Black or African American, 0.24% (8) Native American, 2.04% (67) Asian, 0.00% (0) Pacific Islander, 1.80% (59) from other races, and 2.62% (86) from two or more races. Hispanic or Latino of any race were 6.87% (225) of the population.

Of the 1,364 households, 30.8% had children under the age of 18; 49.5% were married couples living together; 10.8% had a female householder with no husband present and 35.2% were non-families. Of all households, 29.4% were made up of individuals and 8.9% had someone living alone who was 65 years of age or older. The average household size was 2.40 and the average family size was 2.98.

22.5% of the population were under the age of 18, 7.1% from 18 to 24, 30.2% from 25 to 44, 28.5% from 45 to 64, and 11.7% who were 65 years of age or older. The median age was 38.9 years. For every 100 females, the population had 94.3 males. For every 100 females ages 18 and older there were 88.4 males.

The Census Bureau's 2006–2010 American Community Survey showed that (in 2010 inflation-adjusted dollars) median household income was $64,016 (with a margin of error of +/− $6,681) and the median family income was $74,421 (+/− $13,156). Males had a median income of $66,083 (+/− $11,467) versus $40,735 (+/− $7,620) for females. The per capita income for the borough was $30,528 (+/− $3,671). About 7.0% of families and 7.8% of the population were below the poverty line, including 11.6% of those under age 18 and 12.8% of those age 65 or over.

=== 2000 census ===
As of the 2000 United States census there were 3,105 people, 1,173 households, and 844 families residing in the borough. The population density was 2,686.6 inhabitants per square mile (1,037.3/km^{2}). There were 1,233 housing units at an average density of 1,066.9 per square mile (411.9/km^{2}). The racial makeup of the borough was 93.14% White, 0.74% African American, 0.29% Native American, 2.29% Asian, 1.67% from other races, and 1.87% from two or more races. Hispanic or Latino of any race were 4.22% of the population.

There were 1,173 households, out of which 37.3% had children under the age of 18 living with them, 57.7% were married couples living together, 10.5% had a female householder with no husband present, and 28.0% were non-families. 23.3% of all households were made up of individuals, and 6.0% had someone living alone who was 65 years of age or older. The average household size was 2.65 and the average family size was 3.14.

In the borough the population was spread out, with 26.8% under the age of 18, 7.1% from 18 to 24, 35.2% from 25 to 44, 22.8% from 45 to 64, and 8.1% who were 65 years of age or older. The median age was 35 years. For every 100 females, there were 92.1 males. For every 100 females age 18 and over, there were 90.9 males.

The median income for a household in the borough was $58,246, and the median income for a family was $64,773. Males had a median income of $45,729 versus $28,482 for females. The per capita income for the borough was $24,651. About 3.1% of families and 4.6% of the population were below the poverty line, including 5.9% of those under age 18 and 6.4% of those age 65 or over.

== Government ==
=== Local government ===
Hamburg is governed under the borough form of New Jersey municipal government, which is used in 218 municipalities (of the 564) statewide, making it the most common form of government in New Jersey. The governing body is comprised of the mayor and the borough council, with all positions elected at-large on a partisan basis as part of the November general election. The mayor is elected directly by the voters to a four-year term of office. The borough council is comprised of six members elected to serve three-year terms on a staggered basis, with two seats coming up for election each year in a three-year cycle. The borough form of government used by Hamburg is a "weak mayor / strong council" government in which council members act as the legislative body with the mayor presiding at meetings and voting only in the event of a tie. The mayor can veto ordinances subject to an override by a two-thirds majority vote of the council. The mayor makes committee and liaison assignments for council members, and most appointments are made by the mayor with the advice and consent of the council.

As of 2024, the mayor of Hamburg Borough is Republican Richard Krasnomowitz, whose term of office ends December 31, 2026. Members of the Borough Council are John Burd (R, 2025), George Endres (R, 2026), John Haig (R, 2024), Russell Law (R, 2025), Joyce Oehler (R, 2026) and Mark S. Sena (R, 2024).

In August 2018, Joyce Oehler was appointed to fill the seat expiring in December 2020 that had been held by Chris Fitzpatrick until he resigned from office. Oehler won the November 2018 special election to serve the balance of the term of office.

In April 2014, the borough council selected former councilmember Russell Law from a list of three candidates nominated by the Republican municipal committee to fill the vacant seat expiring in December 2016 of Chris Kelly, who had resigned from office after announcing that he would be moving out of the borough. Law served on an interim basis until the November 2014 general election, when he was elected to serve the one year remaining on the term of office.

=== Federal, state and county representation ===
Hamburg is located in the 5th Congressional District and is part of New Jersey's 24th state legislative district.

For the 119th United States Congress, New Jersey's 5th congressional district is represented by Josh Gottheimer (D, Wyckoff). New Jersey is represented in the United States Senate by Democrats Cory Booker (Newark, term ends 2027) and Andy Kim (Moorestown, term ends 2031).

For the 2026–2027 session, the 24th legislative district of the New Jersey Legislature is represented in the State Senate by Parker Space (R, Wantage Township) and in the General Assembly by Dawn Fantasia (R, Franklin) and Mike Inganamort (R, Chester Township).

Sussex County is governed by a Board of County Commissioners whose five members are elected at-large in partisan elections on a staggered basis, with either one or two seats coming up for election each year. At an annual reorganization meeting held in the beginning of January, the board selects a Commissioner Director and Deputy Director from among its members, with day-to-day supervision of the operation of the county delegated to a County Administrator. As of 2025, Sussex County's Commissioners are Director Jill Space (R, Wantage Township, 2025), Deputy Director Chris Carney (R, Frankford Township, 2027), Jack DeGroot (R, Sussex, 2026), William Hayden (I, Branchville, 2025) and Alan Henderson (R, Lafayette Township, 2027).

Constitutional officers elected on a countywide basis are Clerk Jeffrey M. Parrott (R, Wantage Township, 2026), Sheriff Michael F. Strada (R, Hampton Township, 2025) and Surrogate Gary R. Chiusano (R, Frankford Township, 2028).

=== Politics ===
As of March 2011, there were a total of 2,064 registered voters in Hamburg, of which 322 (15.6% vs. 16.5% countywide) were registered as Democrats, 752 (36.4% vs. 39.3%) were registered as Republicans and 988 (47.9% vs. 44.1%) were registered as Unaffiliated. There were 2 voters registered as either Libertarians or Greens. Among the borough's 2010 Census population, 63.0% (vs. 65.8% in Sussex County) were registered to vote, including 81.3% of those ages 18 and over (vs. 86.5% countywide).

Gubernatorial election results for Hamburg
Year	Republican		Democratic		Third party(ies)	
Year	No.	%	No.	%	No.	%
2025	761	55.07%	611	44.21%	10	0.72%
2021	697	62.34%	404	36.14%	17	1.52%
2017	466	56.90%	313	38.22%	40	4.88%
2013	570	67.70%	250	29.69%	22	2.61%
2009	546	59.41%	283	30.79%	90	9.79%
2005	485	56.86%	331	38.80%	37	4.34%

In the 2012 presidential election, Republican Mitt Romney received 733 votes (53.6% vs. 59.4% countywide), ahead of Democrat Barack Obama with 594 votes (43.5% vs. 38.2%) and other candidates with 30 votes (2.2% vs. 2.1%), among the 1,367 ballots cast by the borough's 2,104 registered voters, for a turnout of 65.0% (vs. 68.3% in Sussex County). In the 2008 presidential election, Republican John McCain received 852 votes (57.1% vs. 59.2% countywide), ahead of Democrat Barack Obama with 606 votes (40.6% vs. 38.7%) and other candidates with 24 votes (1.6% vs. 1.5%), among the 1,491 ballots cast by the borough's 2,007 registered voters, for a turnout of 74.3% (vs. 76.9% in Sussex County). In the 2004 presidential election, Republican George W. Bush received 893 votes (63.0% vs. 63.9% countywide), ahead of Democrat John Kerry with 490 votes (34.6% vs. 34.4%) and other candidates with 27 votes (1.9% vs. 1.3%), among the 1,417 ballots cast by the borough's 1,897 registered voters, for a turnout of 74.7% (vs. 77.7% in the whole county).

United States presidential election results for Hamburg 2024 2020 2016 2012 2008 2004
Year	Republican		Democratic		Third party(ies)	
Year	No.	%	No.	%	No.	%
2024	1,075	59.20%	697	38.38%	44	2.42%
2020	1,054	57.28%	748	40.65%	38	2.07%
2016	898	58.96%	564	37.03%	61	4.01%
2012	733	54.02%	594	43.77%	30	2.21%
2008	852	57.49%	606	40.89%	24	1.62%
2004	893	63.33%	490	34.75%	27	1.91%

In the 2013 gubernatorial election, Republican Chris Christie received 67.7% of the vote (570 cast), ahead of Democrat Barbara Buono with 29.7% (250 votes), and other candidates with 2.6% (22 votes), among the 851 ballots cast by the borough's 2,115 registered voters (9 ballots were spoiled), for a turnout of 40.2%. In the 2009 gubernatorial election, Republican Chris Christie received 546 votes (59.2% vs. 63.3% countywide), ahead of Democrat Jon Corzine with 283 votes (30.7% vs. 25.7%), Independent Chris Daggett with 78 votes (8.5% vs. 9.1%) and other candidates with 12 votes (1.3% vs. 1.3%), among the 922 ballots cast by the borough's 1,985 registered voters, yielding a 46.4% turnout (vs. 52.3% in the county).

United States Senate election results for Hamburg1
Year	Republican		Democratic		Third party(ies)	
Year	No.	%	No.	%	No.	%
2024	986	56.63%	681	39.12%	74	4.25%
2018	717	58.06%	445	36.03%	73	5.91%
2012	681	51.47%	570	43.08%	72	5.44%
2006	514	61.26%	286	34.09%	39	4.65%

United States Senate election results for Hamburg2
Year	Republican		Democratic		Third party(ies)	
Year	No.	%	No.	%	No.	%
2020	976	53.80%	789	43.50%	49	2.70%
2014	380	56.05%	275	40.56%	23	3.39%
2013	310	56.99%	230	42.28%	4	0.74%
2008	772	54.10%	586	41.07%	69	4.84%

== Education ==
The Hamburg School District serves students in public school for pre-kindergarten through eighth grade at Hamburg School. As of the 2024–25 school year, the district, comprised of one school, had an enrollment of 246 students and 30.1 classroom teachers (on an FTE basis), for a student–teacher ratio of 8.2:1.

For ninth through twelfth grades, public school students attend Wallkill Valley Regional High School which also serves students from Franklin, Hardyston Township and Ogdensburg, as part of the Wallkill Valley Regional High School District. As of the 2024–25 school year, the high school had an enrollment of 581 students and 49.4 classroom teachers (on an FTE basis), for a student–teacher ratio of 11.8:1.

== Transportation ==
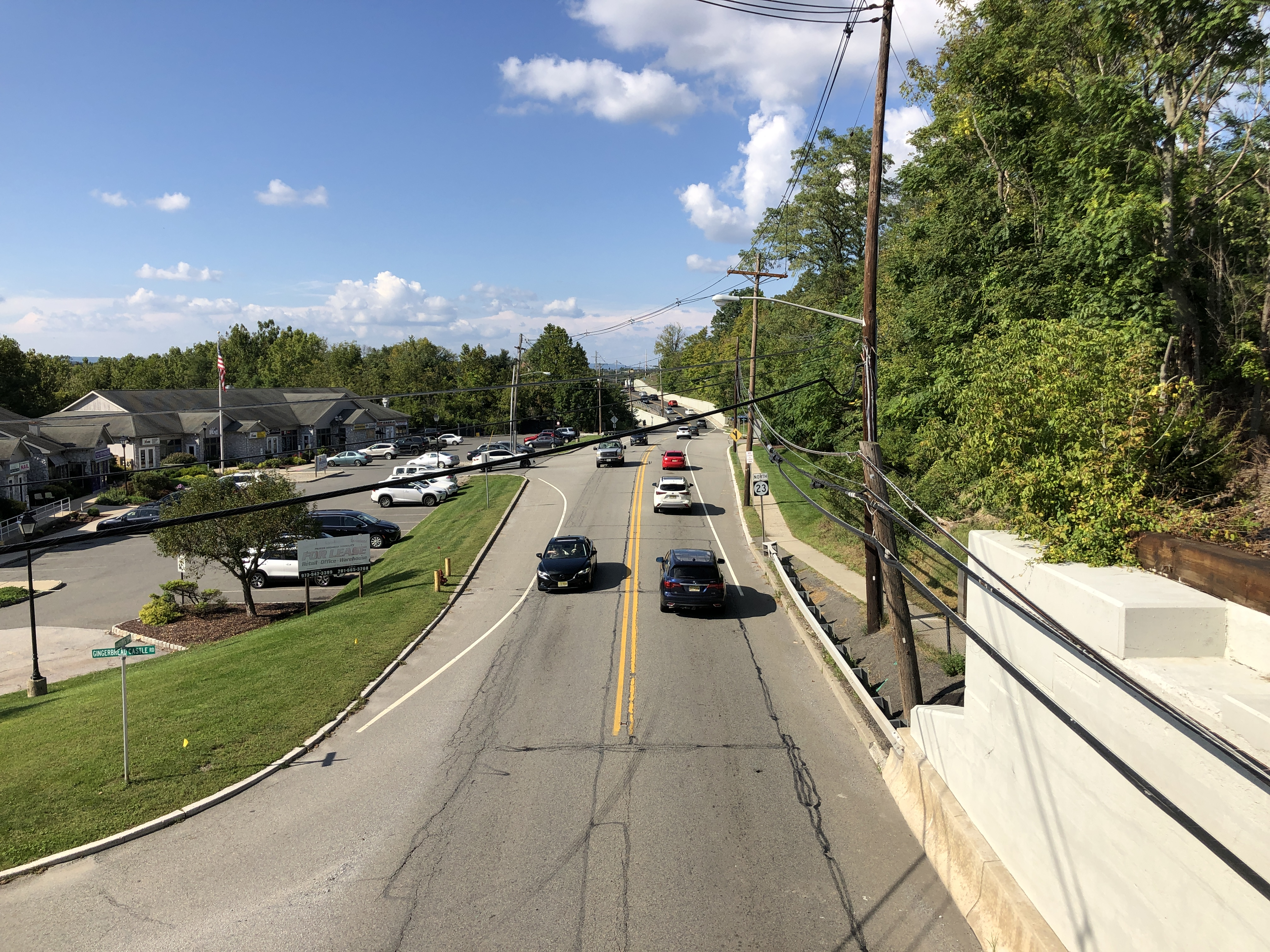
Route 23 northbound in Hamburg

=== Roads and highways ===
As of May 2010, the borough had a total of 11.04 miles (17.77 km) of roadways, of which 7.50 miles (12.07 km) were maintained by the municipality, 1.00 mile (1.61 km) by Sussex County and 2.54 miles (4.09 km) by the New Jersey Department of Transportation.

Route 23 and Route 94 intersect and pass through the borough.

=== Public transportation ===
Hamburg is served by the Sussex County Skylands Ride Service, which provides buses to Newton, Sparta, and Sussex.

== Notable people ==
People who were born in, residents of, or otherwise closely associated with Hamburg include:

- Joseph E. Edsall (1789–1865), represented New Jersey's 4th congressional district in the United States House of Representatives from 1845 to 1847, and the New Jersey's 3rd congressional district from 1847 to 1849
- Daniel Haines (1801–1877), politician, jurist and lawyer who served as the 14th Governor of New Jersey
- Robert Hamilton (1809–1878), represented New Jersey's 4th congressional district in the United States House of Representatives from 1873 to 1877
- Heather Maloney (born 1985), singer-songwriter
- Andrew J. Rogers (1828–1900), represented New Jersey's 4th congressional district in the United States House of Representatives from 1863 to 1867
- Joseph Sharp (c. 1709–1776), iron manufacturer and industrialist who established an iron works that led to the area being known as Sharpsborough
