= A-606 =

A-606, A.606, A 606, or A606 may refer to:

- A 606, a grade of weathering steel
- A606, an A-road in England, UK
- Autoroute 606, or Expressway 606; see List of highways numbered 606

== See also ==
- Alpha 606, Florida-based electronica band
- Area code 606, of Kentucky, US
- 606 (disambiguation)
