= Sandyston-Walpack Consolidated School District =

School district in Sussex County, New Jersey, US

Sandyston-Walpack Consolidated
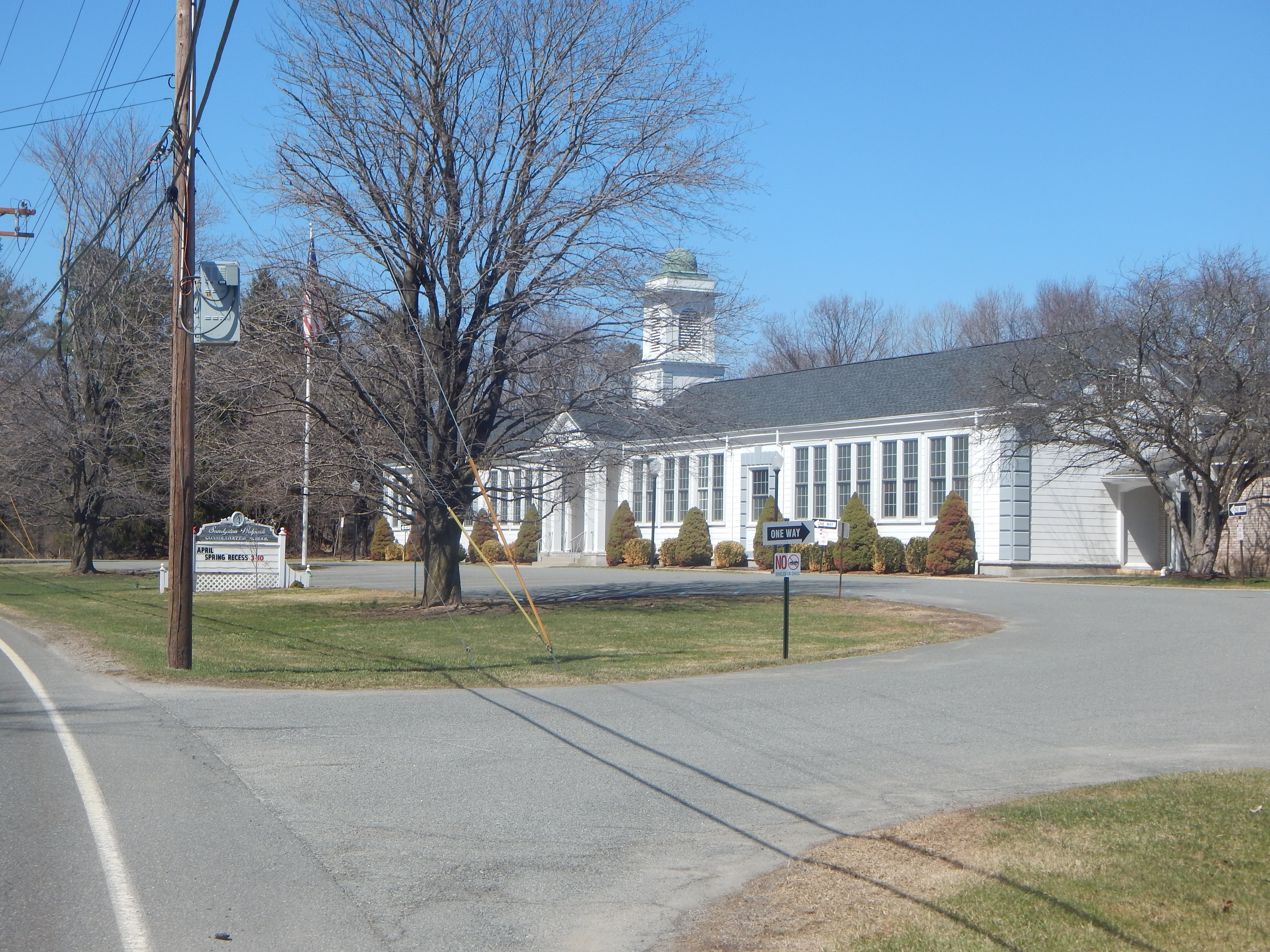
- Sandyston-Walpack Consolidated School, the only school in the district

Address
- 100 Route 560 Layton, Sussex County, New Jersey, 07851; United States
- Coordinates: 41.215158°N 74.8202°W

District information
- Grades: K-6
- Superintendent: William Kochis
- Business administrator: Vincent Occhino
- Schools: 1

Students and staff
- Enrollment: 120 (as of 2022–23)
- Faculty: 14.8 FTEs
- Student–teacher ratio: 8.1:1

Other information
- District Factor Group: DE
- Website: www.sandystonwalpack.org
Ind.	Per pupil	District spending	Rank (*)	K-6 average	%± vs. average
1A	Total Spending	$19,407	44	$18,891	2.7%
1	Budgetary Cost	16,864	51	13,649	23.6%
2	Classroom Instruction	10,383	48	8,366	24.1%
6	Support Services	2,718	46	2,161	25.8%
8	Administrative Cost	1,933	51	1,467	31.8%
10	Operations & Maintenance	1,704	37	1,552	9.8%
13	Extracurricular Activities	26	19	39	−33.3%
16	Median Teacher Salary	54,612	19	57,437
Data from NJDoE 2014 Taxpayers' Guide to Education Spending. *Of K-6 districts with any number of students. Lowest spending=1; Highest=59

The Sandyston-Walpack Consolidated School District is a consolidated public school district that serves students in kindergarten through sixth grade from Sandyston Township and Walpack Township, two communities in Sussex County, in the U.S. state of New Jersey. The school is located in the Layton section of Sandyston Township.

As of the 2022–23 school year, the district, comprised of one school, had an enrollment of 120 students and 14.8 classroom teachers (on an FTE basis), for a student–teacher ratio of 8.1:1. In the 2016–17 school year, Sandyston-Walpack had the 26th smallest enrollment of any school district in the state, with 149 students.

The district is classified by the New Jersey Department of Education as being in District Factor Group "DE", the fifth-highest of eight groupings. District Factor Groups organize districts statewide to allow comparison by common socioeconomic characteristics of the local districts. From lowest socioeconomic status to highest, the categories are A, B, CD, DE, FG, GH, I and J.

Students in seventh through twelfth grade from Sandyston and Walpack Townships for public school attend Kittatinny Regional High School located in Hampton Township, which also serves students who reside in Fredon Township and Stillwater Township. The high school is located on a 96-acre (39 ha) campus in Hampton Township, about seven minutes outside of the county seat of Newton. Kittatinny Regional High School was recognized as a National Blue Ribbon School of Excellence in 1997-98. As of the 2022–23 school year, the high school had an enrollment of 781 students and 79.5 classroom teachers (on an FTE basis), for a student–teacher ratio of 9.8:1.

== School ==
- Sandyston Walpack Consolidated School had an enrollment of 120 students in grades K-6 in the 2022–23 school year.
  - Harold Abraham, principal

== Administration ==
Core members of the district's administration are:

- William Kochis, superintendent
- Vincent Occhino, business administrator and board secretary

== Board of education ==
The district's board of education, comprised of nine members, sets policy and oversees the fiscal and educational operation of the district through its administration. As a Type II school district, the board's trustees are elected directly by voters to serve three-year terms of office on a staggered basis, with three seats up for election each year held (since 2012) as part of the November general election. The board appoints a superintendent to oversee the district's day-to-day operations and a business administrator to supervise the business functions of the district.
