= County Route 560 (New Jersey) =

County highway in New Jersey, U.S.

County Route 560
- Tuttles Corner Road
- CR 560 highlighted in red

Route information
- Length: 5.05 mi (8.13 km)
- Existed: c. 1988–present

Major junctions
- West end: PA 739 at the Pennsylvania state line
- East end: US 206 / CR 521 in Sandyston Township

Location
- Country: United States
- State: New Jersey
- Counties: Sussex

Highway system
- County routes in New Jersey; 500-series routes
| ← CR 559 | → CR 561 |

County Route 560 (abbreviated as CR 560) is an active county highway in Sandyston Township, Sussex County, New Jersey, United States. Known locally as Tuttles Corner Road, the route runs east–west for 5.05 miles (8.13 km) from the Pennsylvania state line at the Dingmans Ferry Bridge over the Delaware River (serving as a continuation of Pike County SR 2019, which connects to SR 739). The entire route west of Ridge Road is in the Delaware Water Gap National Recreation Area. The route ends at a junction with U.S. Route 206 and County Route 521 in Tuttles Corner, a census-designated place in Sandyston Township.

The route began as an alignment of County Route 521, which ran on Tuttles Corner Road from Old Mine Road to the junction in Tuttles Corner. The stretch from the Dingmans Ferry Bridge to Old Mine Road was the original County Route 642. This would become County Route 521 Spur by 1986. CR 521 was realigned along U.S. Route 206 c. 1988 and became CR 560.

== Route description ==
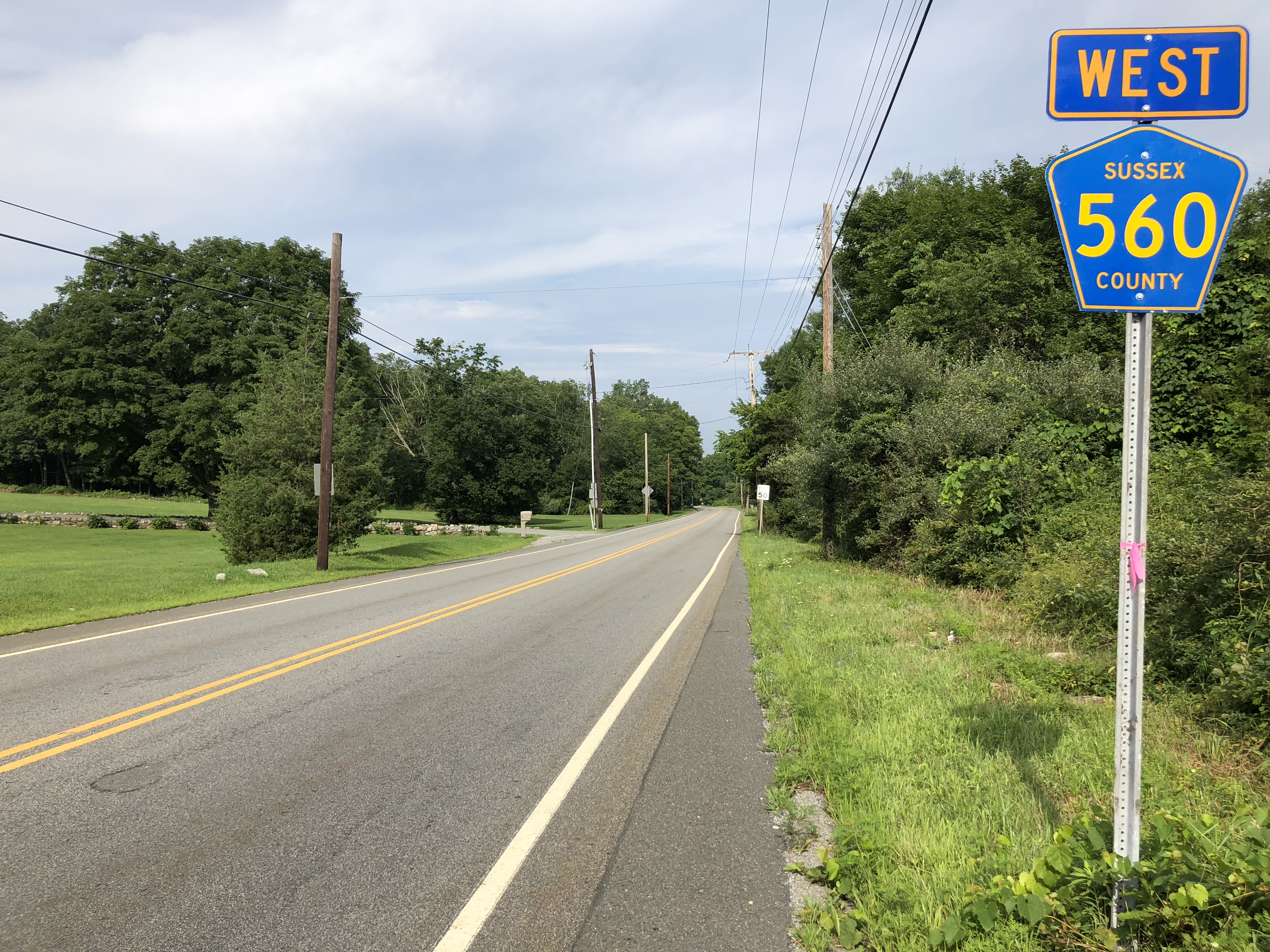
View west at the east end of CR 560 at US 206 in Sandyston

CR 560 begins at the Dingmans Ferry Bridge over the Delaware River in Sandyston Township, where the road continues into Pennsylvania as SR 2019. From the bridge, the route heads east on two-lane undivided Tuttles Corner Road into forests within the Delaware Water Gap National Recreation Area, crossing Old Mine Road, which provides access to the Peters Valley School of Craft. The road turns northeast into more wooded areas with some fields before turning south into agricultural areas with some homes and leaving the Delaware Water Gap National Recreation Area. CR 560 turns east and intersects CR 640, at which point it heads into the residential community of Layton. In Layton, the route intersects CR 645.

Upon leaving Layton, the road turns south and heads into woodland with some fields and residences. CR 560 curves east and comes to an intersection with Ennis Road, which is the closed former alignment of CR 615. At this point, the route enters dense forests. CR 560 reaches its eastern terminus at an intersection with US 206 / CR 521.

== History ==
The alignment of County Route 560 between the Old Mine Road and Tuttles Corner was originally an alignment of County Route 521 (CR 521). CR 521 followed Old Mine Road north to U.S. Route 206 (US 206) in Montague Township. The stretch between the Dingmans Ferry Bridge and Old Mine Road was designated as County Route 642. The stretch between the bridge and Old Mine Road became County Route 521 Spur by 1986. The designation was changed c. 1988 when CR 521 was moved onto US 206 north of Tuttles Corner.

== Major intersections ==
The entire route is in Sussex County.

| Location | mi | km | Destinations | Notes |
|---|---|---|---|---|
| Delaware River | 0.00 | 0.00 | PA 739 north – Dingmans Ferry, Lords Valley | Continuation into Pennsylvania |
| Delaware River | 0.00 | 0.00 | Dingman's Ferry Bridge (toll in Pennsylvania) | |
| Sandyston Township | 0.11 | 0.18 | Old Mine Road – Peters Valley, Montague | Former junction of CR 521 |
| Sandyston Township | 2.66 | 4.28 | CR 640 (Bevans Road) to CR 615 – Peters Valley, Walpack | To National Park Service Route 615 |
| Sandyston Township | 5.05 | 8.13 | US 206 / CR 521 – Milford, Sussex, Newton, Dover | Eastern terminus |
1.000 mi = 1.609 km; 1.000 km = 0.621 mi
