= County Route 521 (New Jersey) =

County highway in New Jersey

County Route 521
- CR 521 highlighted in red

Route information
- Length: 43.71 mi (70.34 km)

Major junctions
- South end: CR 519 / CR 609 in Hope Township
- I-80 in Hope Township; Route 94 in Blairstown Township; US 206 in Frankford Township
- North end: CR 16 at New York state line in Montague Township

Location
- Country: United States
- State: New Jersey
- Counties: Warren, Sussex

Highway system
- County routes in New Jersey; 500-series routes
| ← CR 520 | → CR 522 |

County Route 521 (CR 521) is a county highway in the U.S. state of New Jersey. The highway extends 43.71 miles (70.34 kilometers) from High Street (CR 519) in Hope Township to the New York state line in Montague Township. It is the northernmost road in New Jersey.

CR 521 follows portions of the Military Road, a roadway built during the French and Indian War connecting Elizabethtown, New Jersey (now Elizabeth) with a string of fortifications constructed along the Delaware River in modern Sussex and Warren Counties in northwestern New Jersey.

== Route description ==
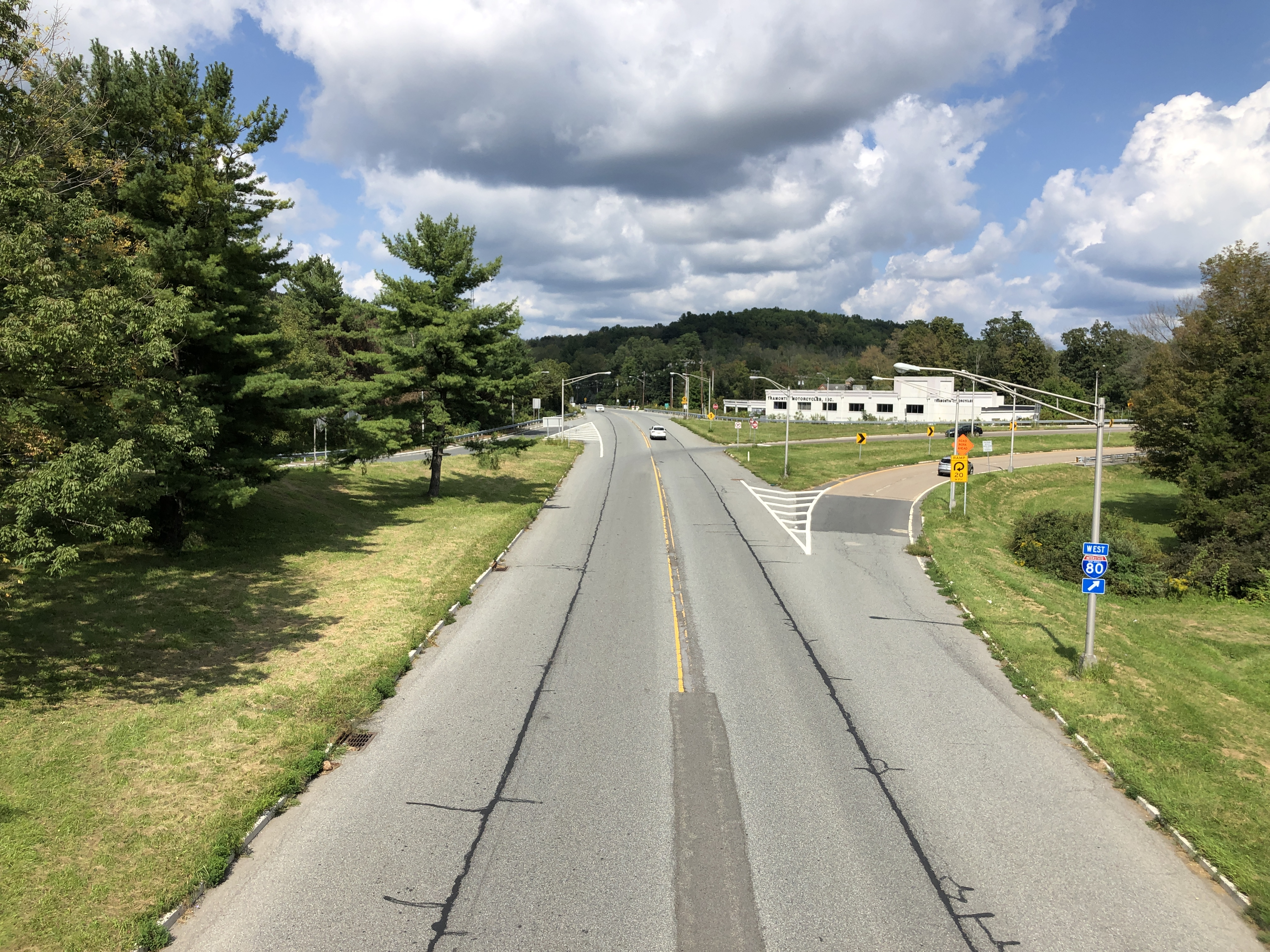
View north along CR 521 from I-80 in Hope Township

CR 521 begins at an intersection with CR 519 and CR 609 in the community of Hope in Hope Township, Warren County, heading north on two-lane undivided Union Street. The road passes homes before reaching the CR 611 junction and becomes Hope-Blairstown Road, running through wooded areas with some farms and homes. The route reaches an interchange with I-80 and winds north through more rural areas, coming to a junction with CR 608. CR 521 enters Blairstown Township and crosses over the abandoned Lackawanna Cutoff railroad line near the Blairstown station. Further north, the route intersects CR 607 before reaching the Route 94 junction and turns west to form a concurrency with that route. The road crosses Paulins Kill and comes into the community of Blairstown, where CR 521 splits from Route 94 at an intersection with CR 602. At this point, CR 521 heads northeast on Stillwater Road, passing a few businesses. The route enters wooded residential areas before coming into Hardwick Township at the CR 601 intersection. In Hardwick Township, the road heads through a mix of farms, woods, and homes, crossing CR 659 and passing near White Lake.

CR 521 crosses into Stillwater Township, Sussex County, at which point the name changes to Maple Avenue. The road continues through rural areas as it reaches the residential community of Stillwater, where at the CR 610 intersection CR 521 makes a left turn onto Stillwater Road to continue northeast, reaching the CR 617 junction. The road turns more north as it heads back into rural surroundings and makes a right turn to the east, intersecting CR 612. In this area, the route passes through dense forests with a few homes and runs northeast along the western short of Swartswood Lake, which is contained within Swartswood State Park. Past the lake, CR 521 has an intersection with CR 622 and crosses into Hampton Township, where there are a few farm fields along the road. At an intersection with CR 626, the route makes a turn northwest onto West Shore Drive before turning west onto Kemah Mecca Lake Road. CR 521 continues through mostly forested mountain areas and makes a turn to the north. The road comes to the CR 617 junction and turns northeast onto Mountain Road, entering Frankford Township. The road passes between Stokes State Forest and the residential western shore of Lake Owassa before coming to a junction with US 206 and CR 521 turns north onto that route.

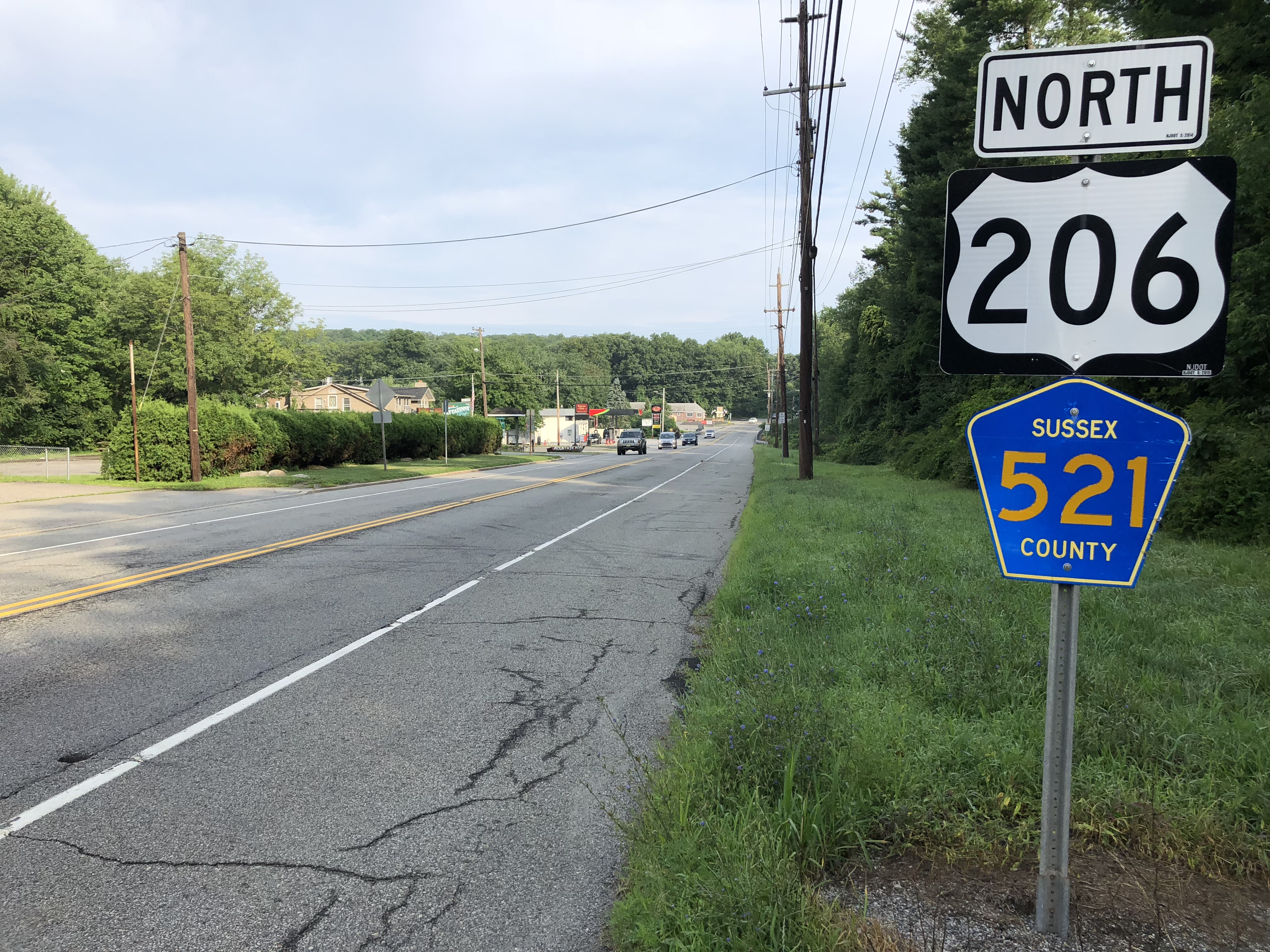
US 206 and CR 521 in Sandyston Township

The concurrent US 206 and CR 521 heads into Sandyston Township, where it crosses the Appalachian Trail at Culvers Gap in Kittatinny Mountain and passes through the mountainous Stokes State Forest. After heading north with a three-lane stretch that has two southbound lanes and one northbound lane, the two-lane road reaches a junction with CR 560. After this intersection, the road leaves the state forest and continues through wooded areas with some commercial establishments. US 206/CR 521 reaches the community of Hainesville, where it passes through more agricultural surroundings with some development. Leaving Hainesville, the road continues into Montague Township. Near the community of Montague, CR 521 splits from US 206 by heading to the northeast. At this point, the route runs along forested River Road, running a short distance southeast of the Delaware River. Along this stretch, the road passes a few farms and homes. CR 521 comes to its northern terminus at the New York border, where the road is less than 250 feet away from an I-84 underpass. The road continues north to Port Jervis, New York as CR 16.

== History ==
Work to build the stretch of CR 521 between Hope and Blairstown occurred in 1922 and 1923, with Korp and Korp of Phillipsburg as the general contractor. This new alignment would replace an old road between the two communities that was once a narrow, dirt road unsuitable for modern automobiles due to the high rates of bumps and dust. The grading for the project was done by the Mateson Construction Company, while the rest of the $300,000 project would be done by Korp and Korp. The new alignment would be made of concrete rather than dirt or macadam and 5.25 miles (8.45 km) long. For the first 3 miles (4.8 km), it would follow the old dirt road before leaving the right-of-way near a local farm. As a result, Blairstown would be able to reach communities to the south and east. The first 3 miles (4.8 km) were paved in 1922, while the rest opened in July 1923.

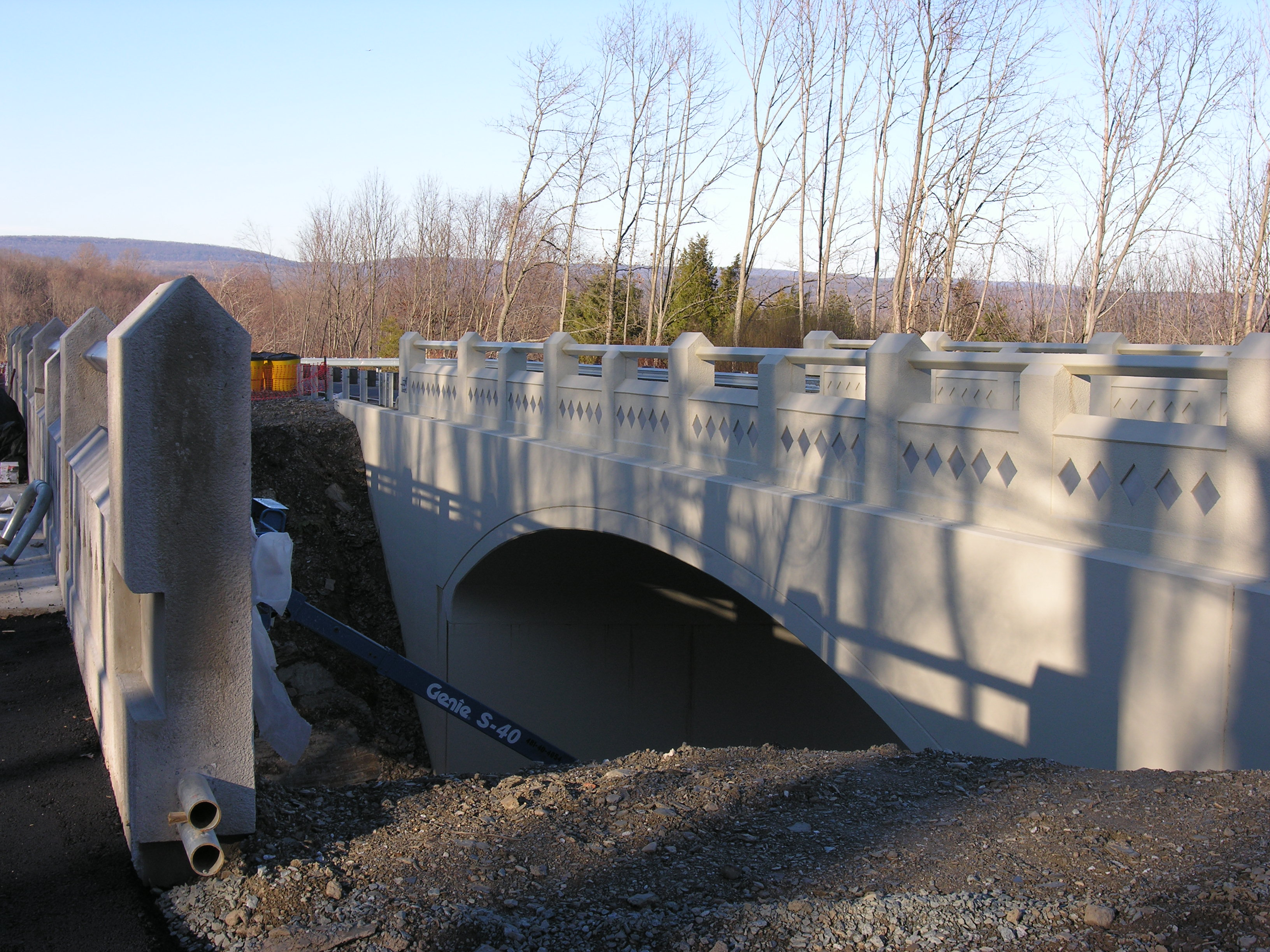
A November 2006 photo of the County Route 521 bridge over the Lackawanna Cut-off right-of-way in Blairstown

During construction of the new alignment, an African-American person working on the crew of 15 came down with smallpox and prior to being isolated for public safety, fled the crew in early May 1923, rushing to the Riverton–Belvidere Bridge, where he could not afford the toll by foot. After that, the person got lost in Warren County. Local physicians pressed the crew from Korp and Korp to vaccinate the rest of the crew against smallpox.

In 1987, the New Jersey Department of Transportation did a study on the CR 521 bridge over the former Lackawanna Cut-Off, a two-lane structure in Blairstown. At the time, traffic on CR 521 along the bridge next to Blairstown station would cost $1 million to build. However, the state decided that they would not fund said bridge at the time. The aging construction of the cut-off affected multiple structures in Warren and Sussex counties. Warren County residents asked if there was any progress in May 1998 on a new bridge over the Cut-Off, which NJ Transit considered for new passenger service. Replacing the bridge would also involve in eliminating the sharp bend in CR 521 next to Blairstown station.

In March 2003, the Department of Transportation added an upgraded CR 521 bridge to their Capital Plan for 2004 construction. $5.1 million of the money would go to upgrading the CR 521 bridge over the railroad right-of-way. As part of the project, the bridge would be widened and become the southbound alignment crossing the Cut-Off. A new bridge would be built to facilitate northbound traffic. CR 521 would be re-aligned on both sides of the bridge.

== Major intersections ==
| County | Location | mi | km | Destinations | Notes |
|---|---|---|---|---|---|
| Warren | Hope Township | 0.00 | 0.00 | CR 519 (High Street / Union Street) / CR 609 | Southern terminus |
| Warren | Hope Township | 1.11– 1.14 | 1.79– 1.83 | I-80 – Netcong, Delaware Water Gap | Exit 12 (I-80) |
| Warren | Blairstown Township | 6.09 | 9.80 | Route 94 north – Newton | South end of Route 94 concurrency |
| Warren | Blairstown Township | 6.35 | 10.22 | Route 94 south – Columbia | North end of Route 94 concurrency |
| Sussex | Frankford Township | 27.06 | 43.55 | US 206 south – Newton | South end of US 206 concurrency |
| Sussex | Sandyston Township | 29.42 | 47.35 | CR 560 west (Tuttles Corner Road) – Layton, Dingmans Bridge | Eastern terminus of CR 560 |
| Sussex | Montague Township | 36.71 | 59.08 | US 206 north – Milford, Stroudsburg | North end of US 206 concurrency |
| Sussex | Montague Township | 43.71 | 70.34 | CR 16 north (South Maple Avenue) – Port Jervis | New York state line; northern terminus |
1.000 mi = 1.609 km; 1.000 km = 0.621 mi: Concurrency terminus
