= PA434 =

PA434 may refer to:

- Philippine Airlines Flight 434
- Pennsylvania Route 434
