= List of highways numbered 604 =

The following highways are numbered 604:

== Canada ==
- Alberta Highway 604
- Ontario Highway 604 (former)
- Saskatchewan Highway 604

== Costa Rica ==
- National Route 604

== United States ==
- SR 604
- County Route 604 (Atlantic County, New Jersey)
- County Route 604 (Burlington County, New Jersey)
- County Route 604 (Camden County, New Jersey)
- County Route 604 (Cape May County, New Jersey)
- County Route 604 (Cumberland County, New Jersey)
- County Route 604 (Essex County, New Jersey)
- County Route 604 (Gloucester County, New Jersey)
- County Route 604 (Hudson County, New Jersey)
- County Route 604 (Hunterdon County, New Jersey)
- County Route 604 (Mercer County, New Jersey)
- County Route 604 (Middlesex County, New Jersey)
- County Route 604 (Morris County, New Jersey)
- County Route 604 (Ocean County, New Jersey)
- County Route 604 (Passaic County, New Jersey)
- County Route 604 (Salem County, New Jersey)
- County Route 604 (Somerset County, New Jersey)
- County Route 604 (Sussex County, New Jersey)
- County Route 604 (Union County, New Jersey)
- County Route 604 (Warren County, New Jersey)
- SR 604
- PR-604
- Farm to Market Road 604
- SR 604

Preceded by 603	Lists of highways 604	Succeeded by 605
