= List of highways numbered 601 =

The following highways are numbered 601:

== Canada ==
- Alberta Highway 601
- Ontario Highway 601
- Saskatchewan Highway 601

== Costa Rica ==
- National Route 601

== Cuba ==
- Jaruco–Santa Cruz Road (2–601)

== United Kingdom ==
- A601(M) motorway - Lancashire

== United States ==
- US 601
- SR 601
- SR 601
- MS 601
- County Route 601 (Atlantic County, New Jersey)
- County Route 601 (Burlington County, New Jersey)
- County Route 601 (Camden County, New Jersey)
- County Route 601 (Cape May County, New Jersey)
- County Route 601 (Cumberland County, New Jersey)
- County Route 601 (Essex County, New Jersey)
- County Route 601 (Gloucester County, New Jersey)
- County Route 601 (Hudson County, New Jersey)
- County Route 601 (Hunterdon County, New Jersey)
- County Route 601 (Middlesex County, New Jersey)
- County Route 601 (Morris County, New Jersey)
- County Route 601 (Ocean County, New Jersey)
- County Route 601 (Passaic County, New Jersey)
- County Route 601 (Salem County, New Jersey)
- County Route 601 (Somerset County, New Jersey)
- County Route 601 (Sussex County, New Jersey)
- County Route 601 (Union County, New Jersey)
- County Route 601 (Warren County, New Jersey)
- PA 601
- SR 601

Preceded by 600	Lists of highways 601	Succeeded by 602
