= List of highways numbered 602 =

The following highways are numbered 602:

== International ==
- European route E602

== Canada ==
- Alberta Highway 602
- Ontario Highway 602

== Costa Rica ==
- National Route 602

== Cuba ==
- Placetas–Fomento Road (4–602)

== United Kingdom ==
- A602 road - Hertfordshire
- M602 motorway - Salford

== United States ==
- Louisiana Highway 602
  - Louisiana Highway 602-1
  - Louisiana Highway 602-2
- Nevada State Route 602
- County Route 602 (Atlantic County, New Jersey)
- County Route 602 (Burlington County, New Jersey)
- County Route 602 (Cape May County, New Jersey)
- County Route 602 (Cumberland County, New Jersey)
- County Route 602 (Essex County, New Jersey)
- County Route 602 (Gloucester County, New Jersey)
- County Route 602 (Hudson County, New Jersey)
- County Route 602 (Hunterdon County, New Jersey)
- County Route 602 (Mercer County, New Jersey)
- County Route 602 (Middlesex County, New Jersey)
- County Route 602 (Morris County, New Jersey)
- County Route 602 (Passaic County, New Jersey)
- County Route 602 (Salem County, New Jersey)
- County Route 602 (Somerset County, New Jersey)
- County Route 602 (Sussex County, New Jersey)
- County Route 602 (Union County, New Jersey)
- County Route 602 (Warren County, New Jersey)
- Ohio State Route 602
- Pennsylvania Route 602 (former)
- Puerto Rico Highway 602
- SR 602
- Virginia State Route 602 (1928-1933) (now US 17)

Preceded by 601	Lists of highways 602	Succeeded by 603
