= Pennsylvania Route 739 =

State highway in Pike County, Pennsylvania, US

Pennsylvania Route 739

Route information
- Maintained by PennDOT
- Length: 19.369 mi (31.171 km)
- Existed: 1967–present

Major junctions
- South end: CR 560 at the New Jersey state line in Dingmans Ferry
- US 209 in Dingmans Ferry; I-84 near Lords Valley; PA 434 / SR 4004 in Lords Valley
- North end: US 6 in Blooming Grove

Location
- Country: United States
- State: Pennsylvania
- Counties: Pike

Highway system
- Pennsylvania State Route System; Interstate; US; State; Scenic; Legislative
← PA 737	→ PA 741

Pennsylvania Route 739 (PA 739) is a Pennsylvania highway contained entirely within Pike County, Pennsylvania. It was signed in 1967, and runs for 19 miles (31 km). Its northern terminus is at U.S. Route 6 (US 6) in Blooming Grove, running south to US 209 in Delaware Township. PA 739's southern end is at the Dingman's Ferry Bridge at the Delaware River near Layton, New Jersey. It continues as County Route 560 (CR 560) in New Jersey.

Traveling northward from the southern terminus, the highway passes through the Delaware Water Gap National Recreation Area. The highway also contains the PA 739 Business District. PA 739 runs under the names Dingman's Pike, Glen Eyre Road and Bethany Road.

== Route description ==
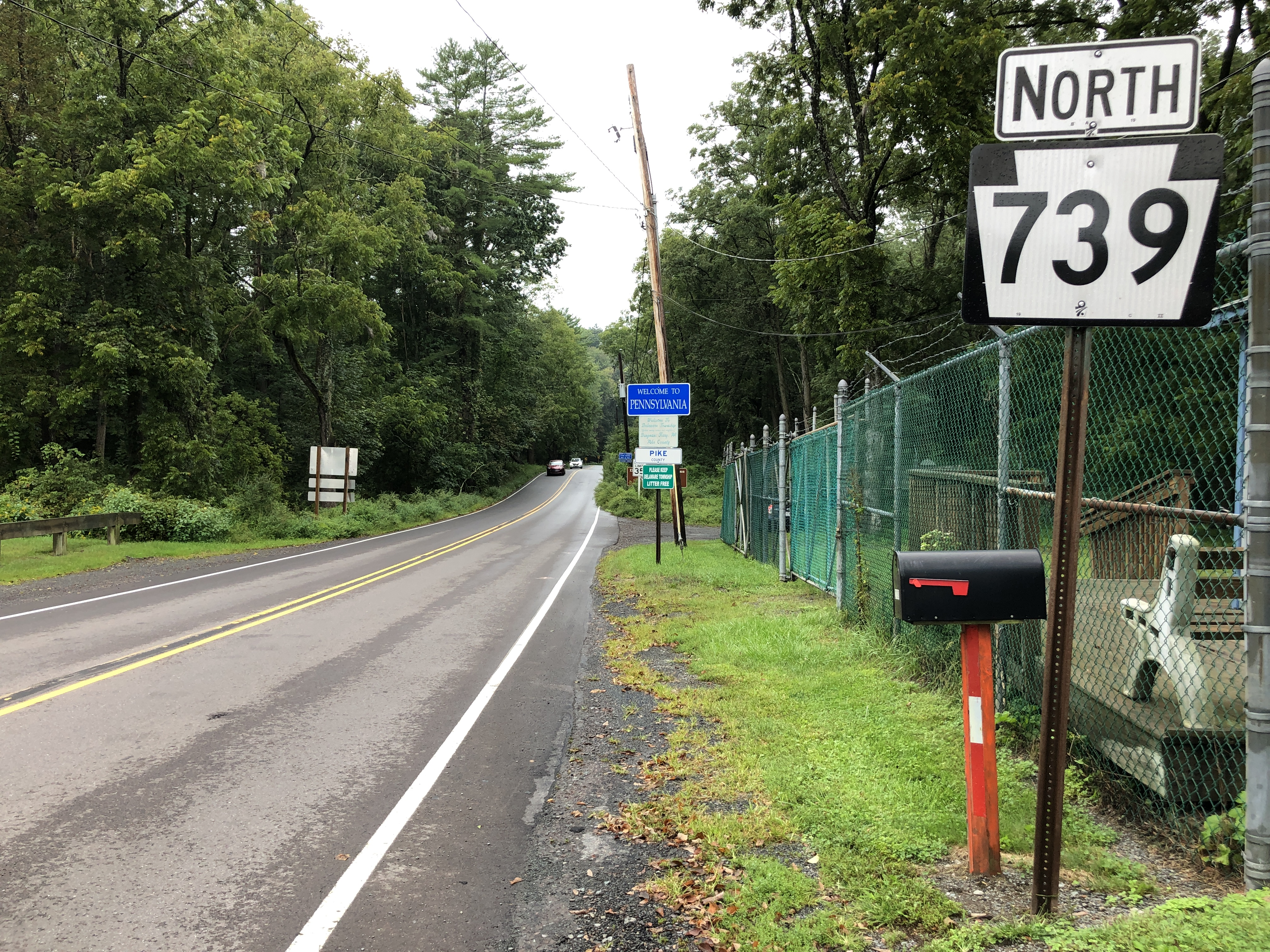
PA 739 northbound at the Dingmans Bridge

PA 739 begins at the Dingman's Ferry Bridge, where CR 560 ends. The road starts by paying a toll for a bridge, which is collected by hand. It goes through dense forests and meets US 209 in Dingmans Ferry. The road then goes north through dense forests. Silver Lake Road (State Route 2004, SR 2004), leaves to the left. Soon after the intersection with Sproul Road, PA 739 leaves the Delaware Water Gap National Recreation Area.

The road passes west of a park and ride lot before PA 739 crosses a traffic light with SR 2001, also known as Milford Road. The road continues through the dense forest and passes three of five Dingman Township schools. PA 739 meets up with SR 2006 (Log Tavern Road). PA 739 leaves Dingman Township and enters Blooming Grove Township.

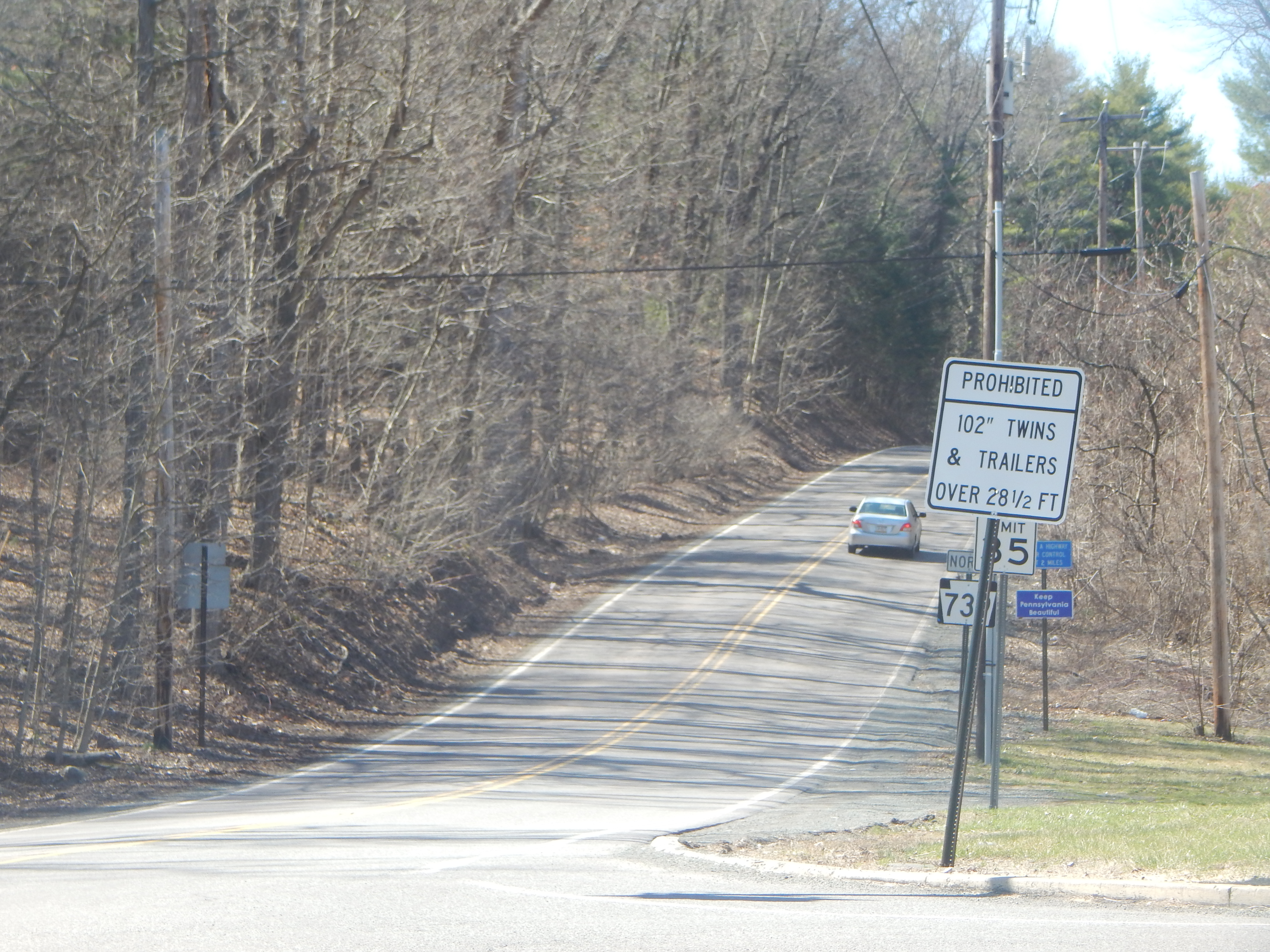
PA 739 northbound from US 209

Continuing north, PA 739 intersects with Interstate 84 (I-84) at Exit 34 (formerly Exit 9) just south of Lords Valley. The road goes farther, crossing SR 4004 and PA 434. At this time, PA 739 changes names to Glen Eyre Road. PA 739 ends at an intersection with US 6 in Blooming Grove. Although the route ends at US 6, the Glen Eyre Road designation continues on.

== History ==
The road was designated PA 739 in 1967 between US 209 and US 6 and has kept the designation since then. In 1978, the road just south of I-84 to two miles (3 km) north of Dingmans Ferry was paved. From 1999 and before, the intersection with PA 434 used to be with SR 1001. The road was changed to PA 434 on the 2003 Pike County Maps. The southernmost portion of PA 739 south of US 209, SR 2019, first appeared on the PennDOT's maps of Pike County in 1993. That designation had existed until it was replaced by an extended PA 739 by 2015.

In 2003, the Pennsylvania Department of Transportation ordered excavation of the intersection of PA 739 and SR 2001 (Milford Road). The project was part of an $812,000 intersection improvement project, which was to be completed that summer. In the year 2007, a project was started that would curves along PA 739 to be completed in 2010 and take about $300,000 to complete.

== Major intersections ==
The entire route is in Pike County.

Location	mi	km	Destinations	Notes
Delaware River	0.000	0.000	CR 560 east (Tuttles Corner Road)	Continuation into New Jersey
Delaware River	0.000	0.000	Dingman's Ferry Bridge (toll)	
Delaware Township	0.598	0.962	US 209 (Federal Highway)	
Blooming Grove Township	14.683– 14.852	23.630– 23.902	I-84 – Scranton, Milford	Exit 34 on I-84
Blooming Grove Township	15.564	25.048	PA 434 north (Well Road)	Southern terminus of PA 434
Blooming Grove Township	19.369	31.171	US 6 – Hawley, Honesdale, Milford	Northern terminus
1.000 mi = 1.609 km; 1.000 km = 0.621 mi: Tolled
