= National Park Service Route 615 =

County Route 615
- NPS 615 in brown, CR 615 in red, abandoned CR 615 in blue

Route information
- Maintained by National Park Service and Sussex County
- Length: 12.5 mi (20.1 km) The CR 615 portion is 0.70 mi (1.13 km)

Major junctions
- South end: River Road in Flatbrookville
- Kuhn Road in Sandyston Township
- North end: CR 640 in Sandyston

Location
- Country: United States
- State: New Jersey
- County: Sussex

Highway system
- County Routes in Sussex County; System; 500-series routes
← CR 614	→ CR 616

National Park Route 615 is a route through the Delaware Water Gap National Recreation Area. The route consists of two parts, County Route 615, maintained by Sussex County, New Jersey, with the remainder of the route maintained by the National Park Service.

County Route 615 is a short county highway in Sussex County, New Jersey. It is 0.70 miles (1.13 km) long from the intersection of Bridge Road, and Walpack Road (near Flat Brook) running north to the fork with Bevans Road, (same intersection as Kuhn Road), entirely within Sandyston Township.

Official maps from both the New Jersey Department of Transportation and Sussex County list the termini of the route at the above points, but some maps suggest the route is much longer, extending as far as County Route 560 in the north, and as far as the Warren County line on Old Mine Road in the south.

Route 615 south of that is maintained by the National Park Service as it travels through the Delaware Water Gap National Recreation Area for 11 miles (18 km). The section is known as National Park Service Route 615.

== Route description ==
=== National Park Service Route 615 ===
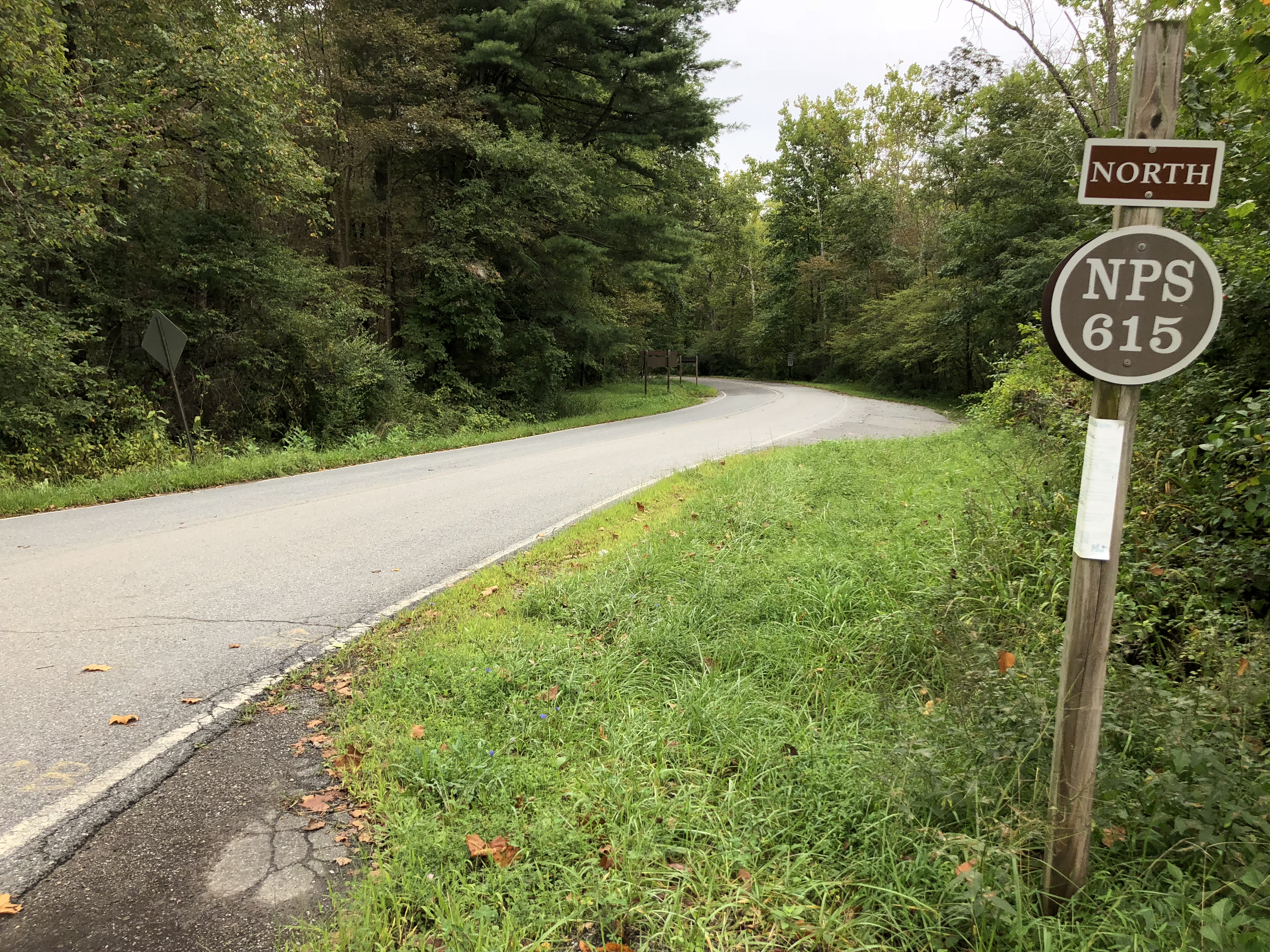
View north at the south end of NPS 615 at Old Mine Road in Walpack Township

National Park Service Route 615 begins at the Warren and Sussex County line south of Flatbrookville, New Jersey. Route 615 heads northward through the Delaware Water Gap National Recreation Area along the alignment of the Old Mine Road until the intersection with Flatbrook-Stillwater Road, where the highway heads to the north. The route soon enters the small community of Flatbrookville, New Jersey (now maintained by the National Park Service), winding through woodlands as a two-lane asphalt highway. A short distance later, Route 615 cross the Flat Brook and turn to the northeast along Walpack Road, paralleling the Flat Brook for several miles. Eventually, the Flat Brook recedes to the southeast, and the highway makes a curve to the northeast through the rural farmlands for several miles. Soon the Flat Brook does return along Route 615 and intersecting with Haneys Mill Road, a dirt road, where the highway turns further northeast along Walpack. The highway continues down the Flat Brook Valley, passing a local RV park before heading northbound through woodlands, where it curves to the north.

At the intersection with Pompey Road, Route 615 turns along Sandyston-Flatbrookville Road, passing the Walpack Inn and another RV park before entering the community of Walpack Center. In Walpack Center, Route 615 passes the nearby Ranger Station and enters the small community, passing the post office at the intersection with Main Street. After leaving Walpack Center, the highway continues northward through fields and sparse housing for several miles. Soon, the ROW of Fish & Game Road merges in with Route 615, where the route turns to the northeast and east. At the intersection with Bridge Road, National Park Service Route 615 turns to the north and heads through forestry before passing nearby houses. At that point, National Park Service Route 615 enters the community of Peters Valley (formerly Bevans), where the maintenance of Route 615 turns over to Sussex County at Kuhn Road.

=== Sussex County Route 615 ===
At the intersection with Kuhn Road and Walpack Road North, Route 615 changes to the northeast along Kuhn Road as Sussex County Route 615. The highway continue northeastward through Peters Valley, a small art-based community before heading northward through the local police archery and reaching the site of a trail, where Route 615 turns to the east. The highway turns eastward along Kuhn Road until the intersection with County Route 640 (Bevans Road), where Route 615 officially ends.

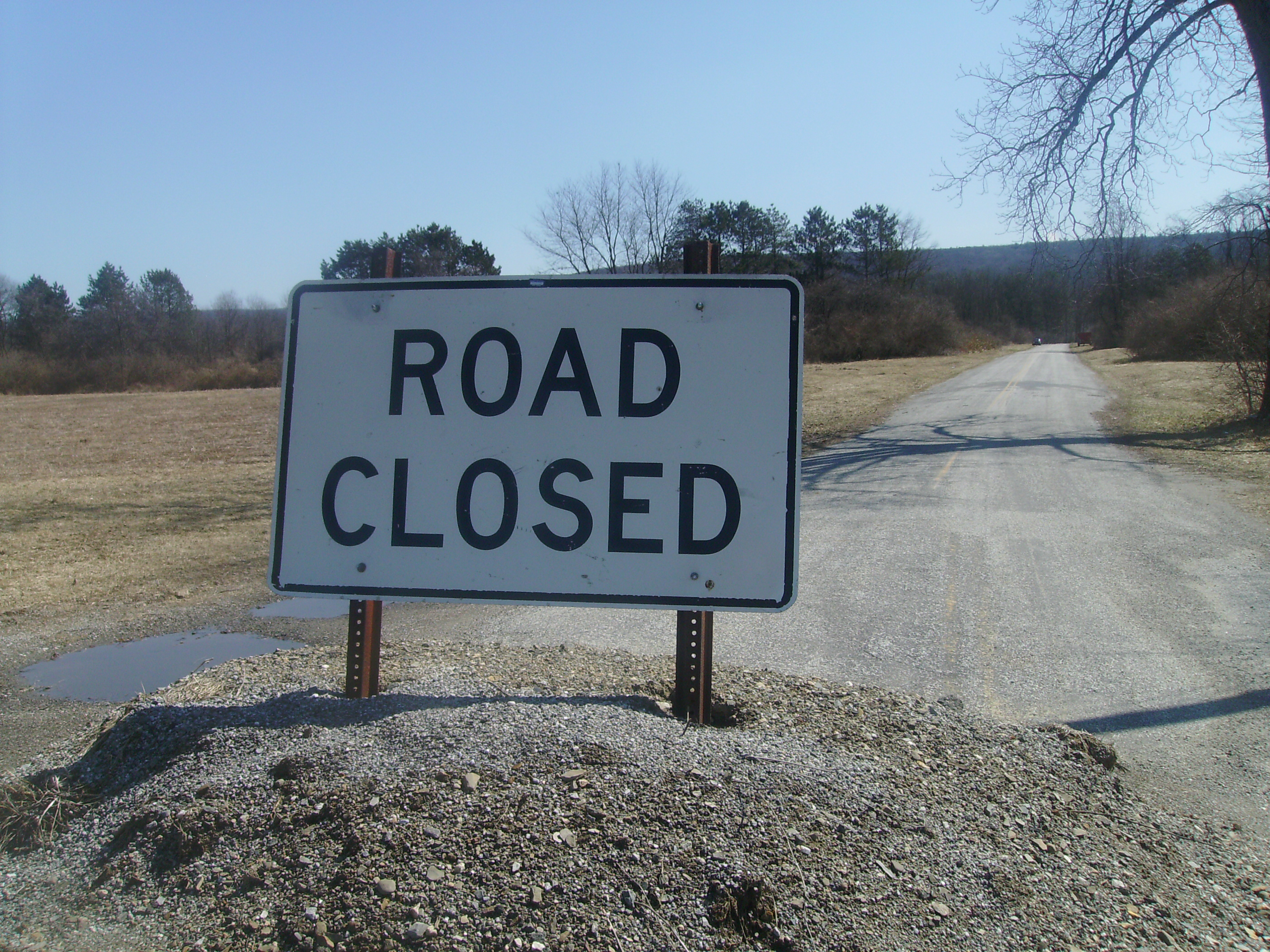
Route 615's abandoned portion of Ennis Road at County Route 640

However, until 2009, signage continued along Ennis Road, a two concrete lane, closed off portion of Route 615 through the ruralmost parts of Sandyston Township. The alignment continued to the southeast, crossing through farmland until entering forestry, where it bended several times until reaching a concrete parking lot. A short distance later, the roadway ended in shrubbery and at a guard rail due to the lack of bridge over a stream. On the other side of the stream, the former alignment of County Route 615 (Ennis Road) continues to the northeast, passing through forestry and fields, where there are several dirt roads. The route continued northward until entering fields near a county maintenance department before intersecting with the County Route 560 (Tuttles Corner Road).

== History ==
Route 615 follows the alignment of the Columbia and Walpack Turnpike through most of its alignment. The original turnpike was chartered in 1819 by the New Jersey State Legislature to run from the community of Columbia to Walpack Center by a vote of 43–2. The Columbia and Walpack Turnpike was originally constructed in 1832, which helped locals develop the communities of Millbrook and Flatbrookville. However, both communities dwindled by 1910, and as of 2009, both communities are used as little tourist attractions. Although the local communities dropped, the Columbia and Walpack Turnpike remained, and due to problems with waterbeds, was realigned during the 1950s. However, this also eliminated the crossroads at the heart of Millbrook and the nearby automobile traffic had already used the Old Mine Road to bypass Millbrook. The former alignment of the Columbia and Walpack is now just a dirt pedestrian path. In 2007, CR 615 officially continued farther south past Kuhn Road to State Park Road for a length of 1.28 mi (2.06 km).

== Major intersections ==
The entire route is in Sussex County.

Location	mi	km	Destinations	Notes
Walpack Township			River Road	Warren–Sussex county line
Walpack Township			Main Street	
Layton	0.00	0.00	Begin Sussex CR 615 NB / NPS-615 SB	Signage at the intersection with Kuhn Road and the Straight Line Diagram do not match for the Southern terminus
Layton	0.00	0.00	Kuhn Road, Walpack Road	
Sandyston Township	0.70	1.13	CR 640 (Bevans Road) / Ennis Road	Northern terminus of County Route 615. Ennis Road continues the ROW
1.000 mi = 1.609 km; 1.000 km = 0.621 mi
