= List of highways numbered 605 =

The following highways are numbered 605:

== Canada ==
- Alberta Highway 605
- New Brunswick Route 605
- Ontario Highway 605
- Saskatchewan Highway 605

== Costa Rica ==
- National Route 605

== United Kingdom ==
- A605 road

== United States ==
- I-605
  - I-605 (former proposals)
- SR 605 (former)
- KY 605
- MS 605
- County Route 605 (Atlantic County, New Jersey)
- County Route 605 (Burlington County, New Jersey)
- County Route 605 (Camden County, New Jersey)
- County Route 605 (Cape May County, New Jersey)
- County Route 605 (Cumberland County, New Jersey)
- County Route 605 (Essex County, New Jersey)
- County Route 605 (Gloucester County, New Jersey)
- County Route 605 (Hudson County, New Jersey)
- County Route 605 (Hunterdon County, New Jersey)
- County Route 605 (Mercer County, New Jersey)
- County Route 605 (Middlesex County, New Jersey)
- County Route 605 (Morris County, New Jersey)
- County Route 605 (Passaic County, New Jersey)
- County Route 605 (Salem County, New Jersey)
- County Route 605 (Somerset County, New Jersey)
- County Route 605 (Sussex County, New Jersey)
- County Route 605 (Union County, New Jersey)
- County Route 605 (Warren County, New Jersey)
- SR 605 (former)
- SR 605
- PR-605
- SR 605

Preceded by 604	Lists of highways 605	Succeeded by 606
