= Hainesville, New Jersey =

Populated place in Sussex County, New Jersey, US

- Unincorporated community
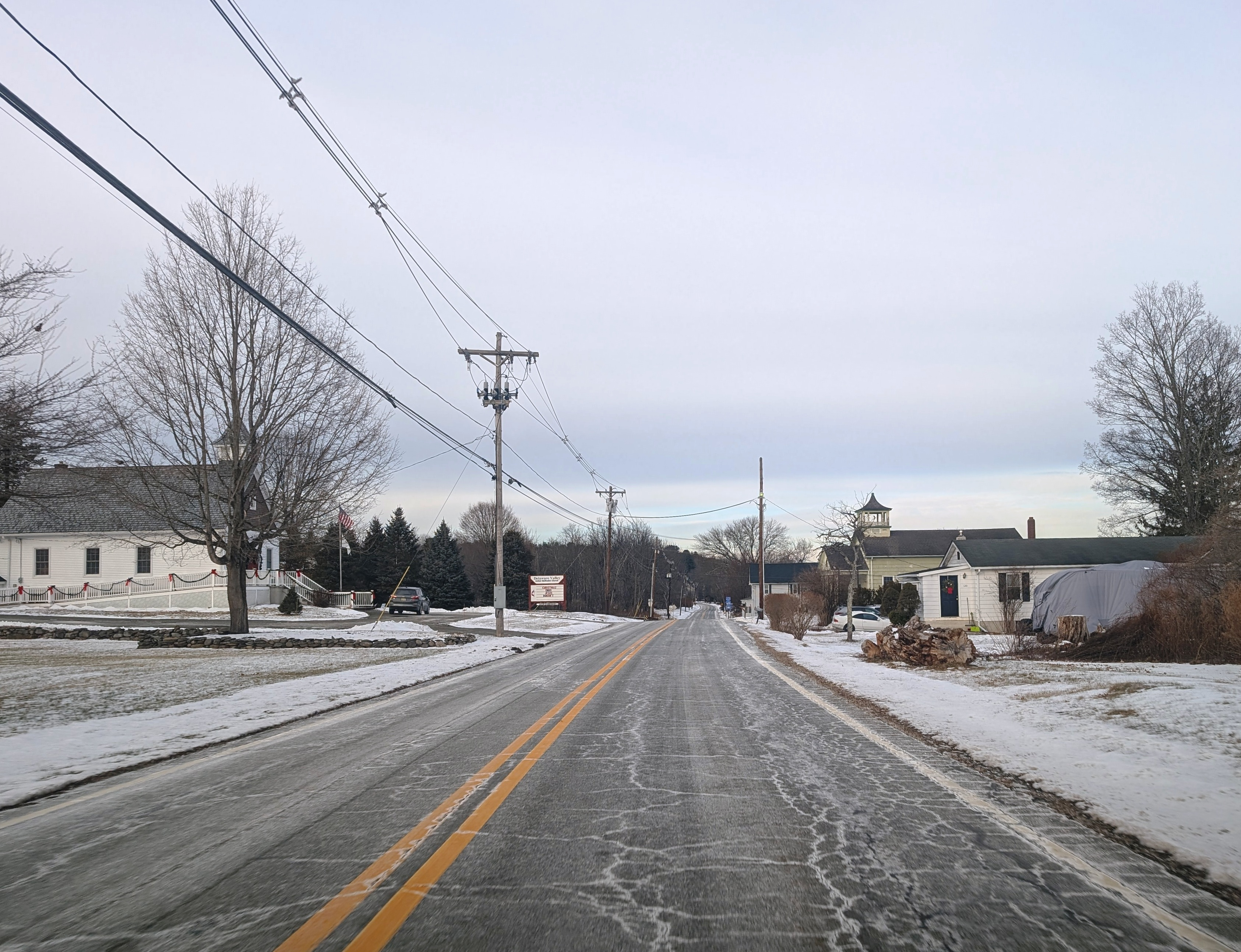
- CR 645 northbound through Hainesville

- Hainesville's location in Sussex County (Inset: Sussex County in New Jersey) Hainesville, New Jersey (New Jersey) Hainesville, New Jersey (the United States)
- Coordinates: 41.25194°N 74.80333°W
- Country: United States
- State: New Jersey
- County: Sussex
- Township: Sandyston
- Named for: Daniel Haines
- Elevation: 620 ft (190 m)
- Time zone: Eastern (EST)
  - Summer (DST): EDT

Hainesville is an unincorporated community located within Sandyston Township, in Sussex County, New Jersey, United States. It lies along a stretch of County Route 645, known as the Layton-Hainesville Road, that runs parallel to U.S. Route 206 and connects to County Route 675. It is adjacent to the Delaware Water Gap National Recreation Area, and near the towns of Shaytown and Layton. Its coordinates are latitude 41.25194 and longitude −74.80333. It is 620 feet (190 meters) above sea level.

Named for Daniel Haines, governor of New Jersey from 1843 to 1844 and from 1845 to 1848, it is in Area code 973, and ZIP Code 07826, both of which it shares with Branchville, New Jersey.

== Description ==
Hainesville and environs is home to the Hainesville General Store, Hidden Acres Golf Course, the Hainesville Fish and Wildlife Management Area, a body of water known as the Hainesville Pond, and the Hainesville Cemetery c. 1879 and Shaytown Burial Ground c. 1812. The Catholic parish St. Thomas the Apostle is actually located in nearby Layton.

== Notable people ==
People who were born in, residents of, or otherwise closely associated with Hainesville include:

- Blase Cole (born November 21, 1879), a physician who served in the New Jersey Senate, representing Sussex County, from 1925 to 1936. He was additionally an alternate New Jersey delegate to the Democratic National Convention in 1932.
- The comic-book artist Bill Sienkiewicz was raised in Hainesville from the age of five.
