= List of highways numbered 603 =

The following highways are numbered 603:

== Canada ==
- Alberta Highway 603
- Ontario Highway 603
- Saskatchewan Highway 603

== Costa Rica ==
- National Route 603

== United States ==
- County Road 603 (Indian River County, Florida)
- County Route 603 (Atlantic County, New Jersey)
- County Route 603 (Burlington County, New Jersey)
- County Route 603 (Camden County, New Jersey)
- County Route 603 (Cape May County, New Jersey)
- County Route 603 (Cumberland County, New Jersey)
- County Route 603 (Essex County, New Jersey)
- County Route 603 (Hudson County, New Jersey)
- County Route 603 (Hunterdon County, New Jersey)
- County Route 603 (Middlesex County, New Jersey)
- County Route 603 (Morris County, New Jersey)
- County Route 603 (Ocean County, New Jersey)
- County Route 603 (Passaic County, New Jersey)
- County Route 603 (Salem County, New Jersey)
- County Route 603 (Somerset County, New Jersey)
- County Route 603 (Sussex County, New Jersey)
- County Route 603 (Union County, New Jersey)
- SR 603
- PR-603
- FM 603
- SR 603
- SR 603 (former)

| Preceded by 602 | Lists of highways 603 | Succeeded by 604 |
