= Peters Valley School of Craft =

American arts organization

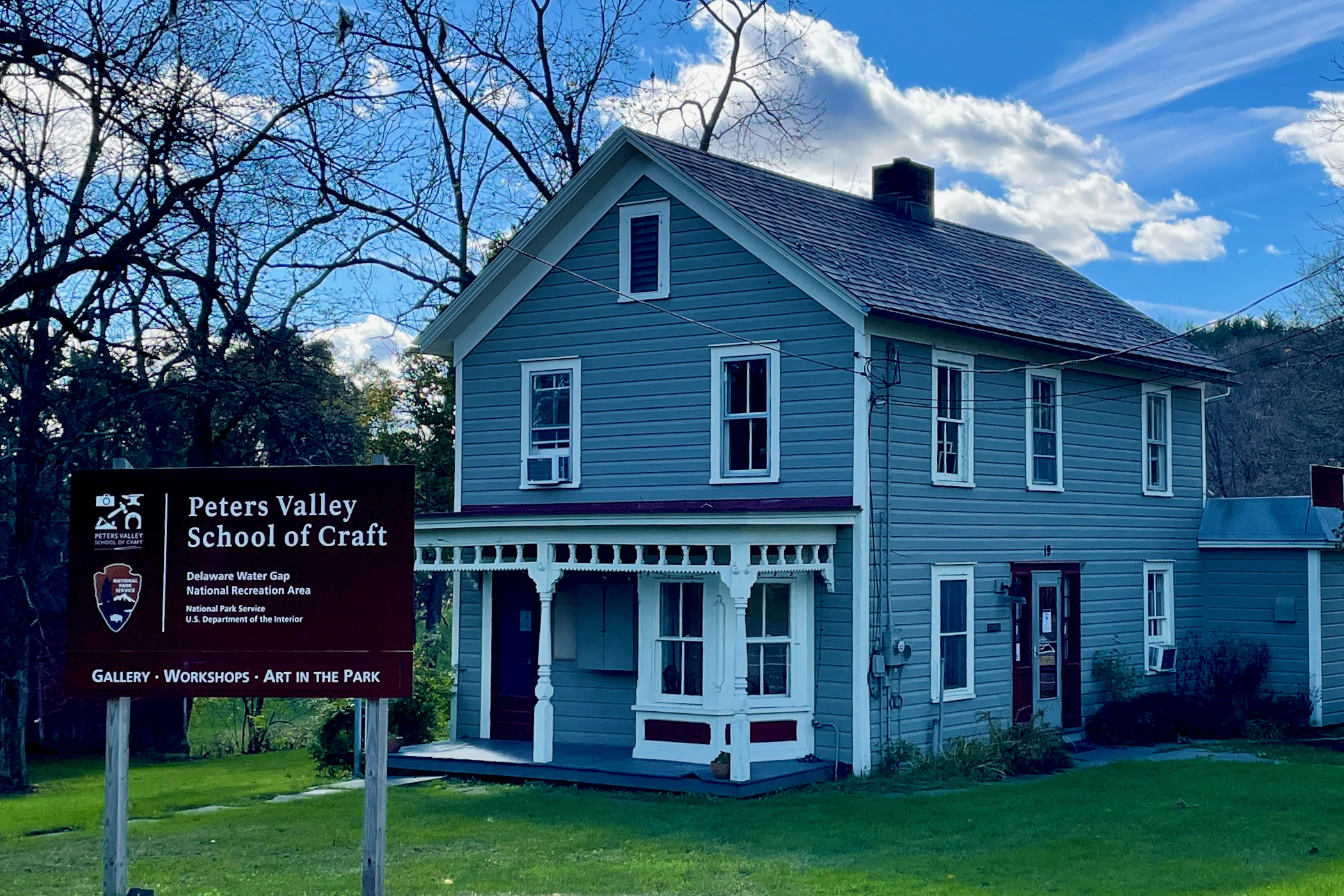

- Location within Sussex County, New Jersey Peters Valley School of Craft (New Jersey)
- Formation: 1970; 56 years ago
- Headquarters: 19 Kuhn Road, Layton, New Jersey, United States
- Coordinates: 41.196047°N 74.851105°W
- Website: petersvalley.org
- Formerly called: Peters Valley Craftsmen

Peters Valley School of Crafts (formerly the Peters Valley Craftsmen) is a nonprofit arts organization and craft school within the Delaware Water Gap National Recreation Area in Layton, New Jersey. It is located an hour and a half drive from New York City, and is part of the NRHP-listed Peters Valley Historic District.

== History ==
Peters Valley School of Crafts was incorporated in 1970 as a nonprofit dedicated to crafts, and was opened in 1971 as an experimental artist colony (or "living village") in the existing 18th and 19th century buildings. The headquarters is in the Victorian-style Doremus House.

They host the annual Peters Valley Craft Fair, to help support the school. In 2020, the Peters Valley School of Crafts celebrated their 50th anniversary with a group art exhibition at the Hunterdon Art Museum in Clinton, New Jersey.

== About ==
The school focuses on education (non-degree) in blacksmithing, ceramics, surface design, fiber arts and weaving, light metals, photography, woodworking and glassmaking. They offer workshops, youth classes, and artist residencies. The campus contains art studios, dormitories, a dining hall, offices, and a gallery.
