= List of highways numbered 598 =

Route 598, or Highway 598, may refer to:

== Canada ==
- Alberta Highway 598
- Ontario Highway 598

== Ireland ==
- R598 regional road

== United Kingdom ==
- A598 road

== United States ==
- KY 598
- LA 598
- MD 598
- NM 598
- NY 598
- SR 598
- PR-598
- SR 598
- WV 598
- MS 598
- FM 598

Preceded by 597	Lists of highways 598	Succeeded by 599
