= List of highways numbered 599 =

The following highways are numbered 599:

== Canada ==
- Alberta Highway 599
- Ontario Highway 599

== Ireland ==
- R599

== United Kingdom ==
- A599

== United States ==
- Florida State Road 599 – hidden designation for a portion of U.S. Route 41 in and near Tampa
- Kentucky Route 599
- Nevada State Route 599
- New Mexico State Road 599
- Puerto Rico Highway 599
- Texas Farm to Market Road 599
- Washington State Route 599

Preceded by 598	Lists of highways 599	Succeeded by 600
