= List of highways numbered 600 =

The following highways are numbered 600:

== Canada ==
- Alberta Highway 600
- Saskatchewan Highway 600
- Ontario Highway 600

== Cuba ==
- 2–600

== Korea, South ==
- Busan Ring Expressway

== United States ==
- SR 600
- County Route 600 (Burlington County, New Jersey)
- County Route 600 (Camden County, New Jersey)
- County Route 600 (Hunterdon County, New Jersey)
- County Route 600 (Mercer County, New Jersey)
- SR 600
- PR-600
- SR 600

Preceded by 599	Lists of highways 600	Succeeded by 601
