= 606 (disambiguation) =

606 may refer to:

- 606, the year
- The drug "606" or "compound 606", which became known as arsphenamine
- Roland TR-606 Drum Machine
- 606 (radio show), the BBC Radio 5 Live phone-in and accompanying internet discussion forum
- The 606, a network of urban parks in Chicago highlighted by an elevated park converted from the Bloomingdale rail Line.
- Area code 606, in Kentucky
- 606 Group (band), a progressive rock band from Stockport, England
- Monark 606, a sailboat class.

== See also ==
- A-606 (disambiguation)
