= Pennsylvania Route 434 =

State highway in Pike County, Pennsylvania, US

Pennsylvania Route 434
- PA 434 highlighted in red

Route information
- Maintained by PennDOT and JIBC
- Length: 12.471 mi (20.070 km)
- Existed: c. June 1966–present

Major junctions
- South end: PA 739 in Lords Valley
- US 6 in Greeley; PA 590 in Greeley
- North end: NY 55 / NY 97 in Shohola Township

Location
- Country: United States
- State: Pennsylvania
- Counties: Pike

Highway system
- Pennsylvania State Route System; Interstate; US; State; Scenic; Legislative
← PA 433	→ PA 435
← PA 36	→ PA 38
← PA 136	→ PA 138

Pennsylvania Route 434 (PA 434, designated by the Pennsylvania Department of Transportation as SR 0434) is a 12.47-mile-long (20.07 km) state highway located in northeast Pennsylvania. The western terminus of the route is at PA 739 in the Blooming Grove Township community of Lords Valley. The eastern terminus of the route is at the New York-Pennsylvania border in Shohola Township, where PA 434 crosses the Delaware River and enters New York, becoming New York State Route 55 (NY 55) at an intersection with NY 97 in the town of Highland. PA 434 used to be part of PA 37 and PA 137.

== Route description ==
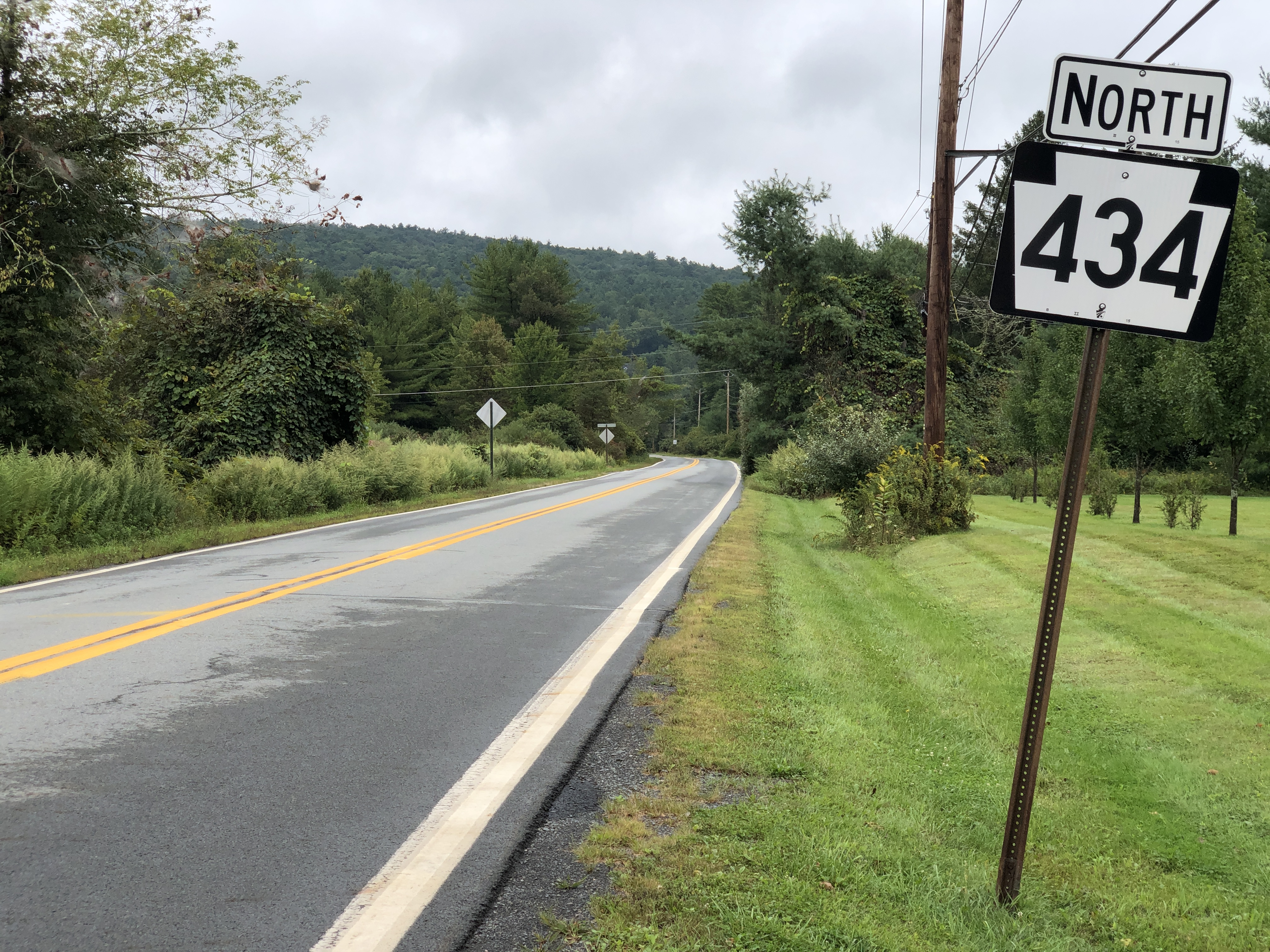
PA 434 northbound in Shohola

PA 434 begins at an intersection with PA 739 and State Route 4004 (SR 4004) in Lords Valley, a community in Blooming Grove Township. PA 434 heads to the northeast, passing businesses and homes before leaving the community. The highway then gets into a more scenic rural region, with trees surrounding the highway. PA 434, which makes several curves for the next few miles, passes to the south of a lake. The highway continues on for several miles in this way. A short time later, the highway passes a couple homes and crosses Shohola Creek. Just north of the creek, the area becomes somewhat urbanized with homes beginning to surround the road again. However, this does not last long, with forests returning once more. Just north of the community, PA 434 intersects U.S. Route 6 (US 6).

After the intersection with US 6, the surroundings around the highway become a mix of homes and forests. This lasts for much of the distance on PA 434 until Greeley, where it becomes urbanized again. In downtown Greeley, PA 434 splits at an intersection where PA 590 begins. The highway makes a curve, turning to the southeast for a distance north of Greeley. Soon afterwards, PA 434 parallels Shohola Creek, heading northeastward. PA 434 begins to become urbanized for a third time, passing some large buildings along with homes and forests. The creek continues to parallel, with the highway turning in several different directions. The forests begin to recede as PA 434 enters Shohola Township. Twin Lakes Road, a quadrant route, terminates at PA 434 before the route passes under the Southern Tier Line owned by Norfolk Southern and operated by the Central New York Railroad and crosses the Delaware River, where the road becomes NY 55 and Sullivan County Route 11 at the border. (Note: The actual northern terminus of PA 434 is at the New York–Pennsylvania border in the middle of the Delaware River, roughly 400 yards (370 m) from where its locally-maintained continuation into New York intersects NY 97 and NY 55.)

== History ==
In 1928, what is now PA 590 between Lackawaxen and present-day PA 434 in Greeley was designated PA 37. From Greeley, PA 37 continued south along the PA 434 alignment to its southern terminus at US 6. In 1946, PA 37 was removed from the PA 590 alignment.

While PA 37 occupied the 1.5-mile (2.4 km) segment of modern PA 434 from US 6 to Greeley, a spur of PA 37, PA 137, occupied the remainder of PA 434 from Greeley to the state line from 1928 to 1946. In 1946, however, PA 37 was realigned to follow the entire alignment of PA 434 from US 6 to New York, decommissioning PA 137 in the process. PA 37 remained in existence until c. June 1966 when PA 37 was replaced by PA 434. In 2004, PA 434 was extended from its southern terminus down to an intersection with PA 739 in Lords Valley.

PA 434 shared a brief 0.1-mile (0.16 km) concurrency with US 6 after its extension to PA 739 was created. A new unsignalized intersection was built between 2005 and 2008 eliminating this concurrency.

== Major intersections ==
The entire route is in Pike County.

Location	mi	km	Destinations	Notes
Blooming Grove Township	0.000	0.000	PA 739 / SR 4004 west (Blooming Grove Road) to I-84 – Dingmans Ferry, Hawley, Blooming Grove	Western terminus
Shohola Township	3.884	6.251	US 6 – Hawley, Milford	
Greeley	7.896	12.707	PA 590 west – Lackawaxen, Rowland	Eastern terminus of PA 590
Delaware River	12.471	20.070	Barryville–Shohola Bridge	
Delaware River	12.471	20.070	NY 55 east / NY 97 – Barryville	Northern terminus; New York state line; western terminus of NY 55
1.000 mi = 1.609 km; 1.000 km = 0.621 mi
