= List of highways numbered 606 =

The following highways are numbered 606:

== Afghanistan ==
- Route 606 (Afghanistan)

== Canada ==
- Highway 606 (Ontario)
- Saskatchewan Highway 606

== Costa Rica ==
- National Route 606

== United Kingdom ==
- M606 motorway
- A606

== United States ==
- SR 606 (Florida)
- SR 606 (Ohio)
- PR-606 (Puerto Rico)
- FM 606 (Texas)
- SR 606 (Virginia)
- CR 606 (Camden County, New Jersey)

== See also ==
- Loudoun Gateway (WMATA station), a planned Washington Metro station formerly named Route 606
- Wind Chill - a horror film taking place on a "Route 606"

Preceded by 605	Lists of highways 606	Succeeded by 607
