= Alpha 606 =

American electronic project

- Also known as: AM
- Born: November 15, 1974 (age 51); Hialeah, Florida
- Origin: Miami, Florida
- Genres: Electro; Miami bass
- Years active: 1998 to Present
- Labels: Interdimensional Transmissions; Dopamine; Touchin' Bass
- Members: Armando Martinez
- Past members: Rey Rubio; Marino Hernandez; Danny Chirino
- Website: http://alpha606.com

Alpha 606 is an acoustic/electronic music project based out of Miami. Alpha606 was originally conceived as a duet between Armando Martinez and Rey Rubio in 1998. Martinez is a programmer/composer and Rubio is a performing sound engineer. The duet expanded in 2003 and was joined by two percussionists, Marino Hernandez and Danny Chirino.

Their debut EP, Computer Controlled, was released on Dopamine Records in 2004. The group played a few live shows as a quartet, before parting ways. Since, Alpha 606 has consisted of solo artist Armando Martinez. Martinez continued touring and performing as Alpha 606 since 2004 with his solo laptop sets. Alpha 606 performed in Barcelona, London, Brussels, Helsinki, Bournemouth, Birmingham and Miami.

Alpha 606 has recorded on Interdimensional Transmissions and Touchin' Bass.

== Reaction ==
New Miami Times described their music as "a futuristic homage to Cuban culture, fusing warm machine tones and crisp bass notes with Afro-Cuban drums." Their style merges the drumbeat into the track: "Rubio and Martinez ensure that the drums don't 'sit on top' of the track, instead processing the rhythms so that they're subsumed into the rest of it, forming an elastic foundation."

== Discography ==
- Electrónica Afro-Cubano (EP) Interdimensional Transmissions 2008
- Computer Controlled (12") Dopamine Records 2004

=== Remixes ===
- Nomadic Metro-Mover (12") Alphaphix (Alpha 606 Guanabana Mix) Dopamine Records 2005
- Exzakt Reworked and Remixed (12") Sleeping With The Enemy (Alpha 606 mix) Monotone 2006

=== Appearances ===
- Future Sound of Breaks (CD) Domino Sound Records (US) 2005
- Subsidence (CD, Promo) Anarchy In China Touchin' Bass 2005
- (2xLP) Anarchy In China Touchin' Bass 2005
- Subsidence (CD) Anarchy In China Touchin' Bass 2005
- Nobody's Perfect Part Two (CD, Promo) Anarchy In China Touchin' Bass 2006
- Nobody's Perfect Part Two (CD) Anarchy In China Touchin' Bass 2006
- Ten Volt (CD) Rise of Human Being Transient Force 2007
