= Bevans, New Jersey =

Populated place in Sussex County, New Jersey, US

- Unincorporated community
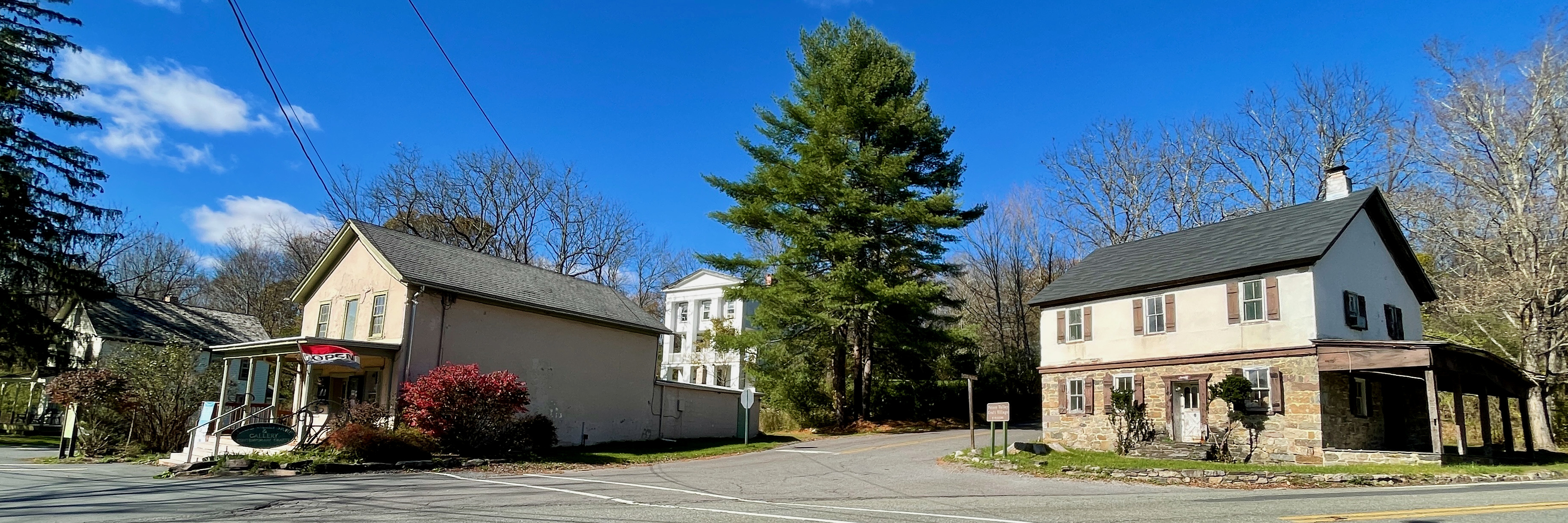
- Panorama of the village

- Location within Sussex County, New Jersey Location within New Jersey Location within the United States
- Coordinates: 41°11′47″N 74°51′03″W
- Country: United States
- State: New Jersey
- County: Sussex
- Township: Sandyston
- GNIS feature ID: 879253

Bevans, also known as Peters Valley, is an unincorporated community located at the intersection of Bevans Road (County Route 615), Walpack Road (National Park Service Route 615), and Kuhn Road in Sandyston Township of Sussex County, New Jersey. The village is now part of the Delaware Water Gap National Recreation Area. Both the Delaware River and the Old Mine Road are nearby.

== History ==
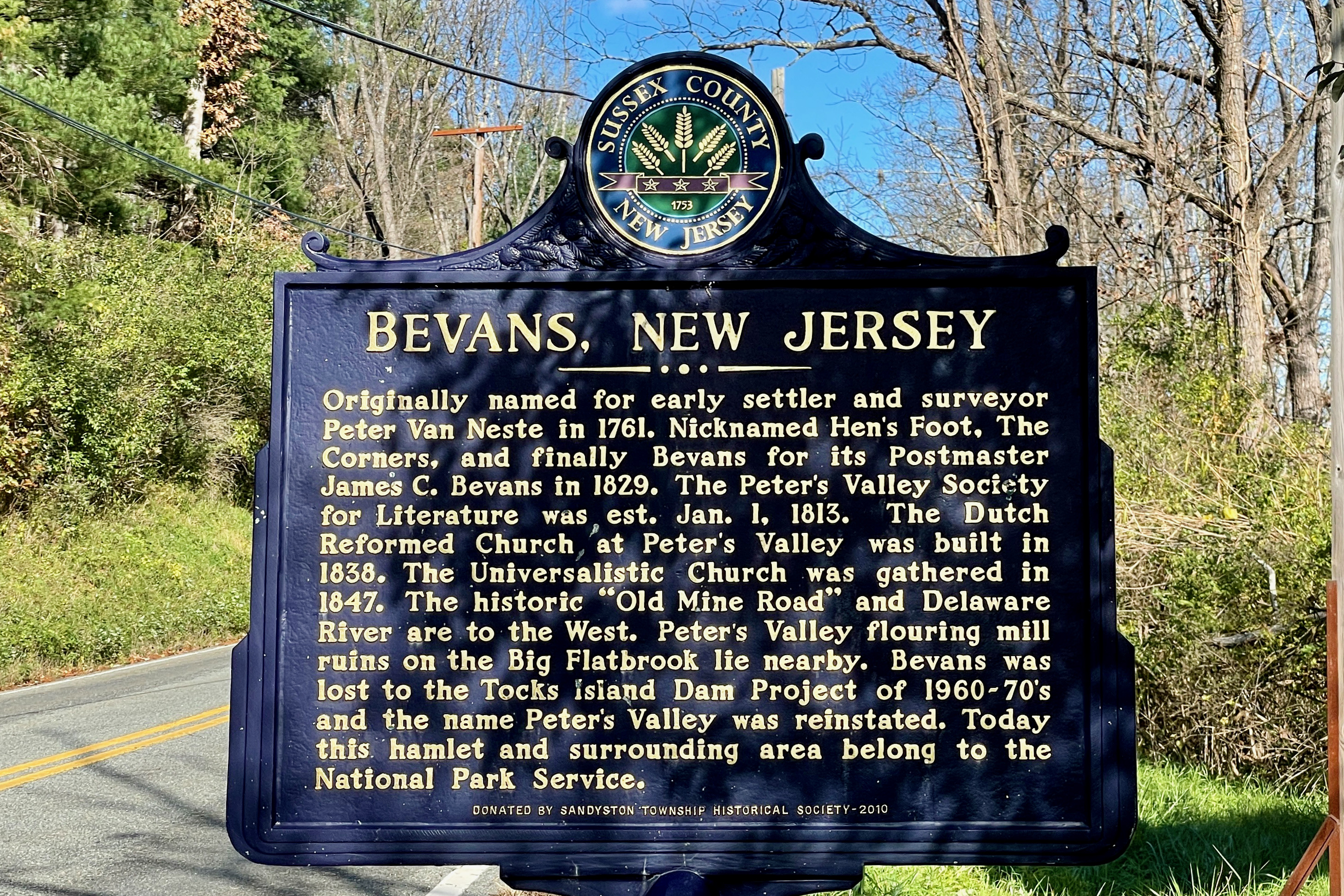
Historical information

In 1761, it was named Peters Valley after an early settler, Peter Van Neste. In 1829, it was named Bevans after postmaster James C. Bevans. The Old Dutch Reformed Church was built with cut fieldstone in c. 1825. It was later used as a school, tavern, hotel, dance hall, and residence. It was replaced by the Dutch Reformed Church of Peters Valley, which was built in c. 1838. The church is surround by a large churchyard.

The Peters Valley School of Craft was incorporated in 1970, and uses the Victorian-style Doremus House as its headquarters.

== Historic district ==
- Peters Valley Historic District
- U.S. National Register of Historic Places
- U.S. Historic district
- New Jersey Register of Historic Places
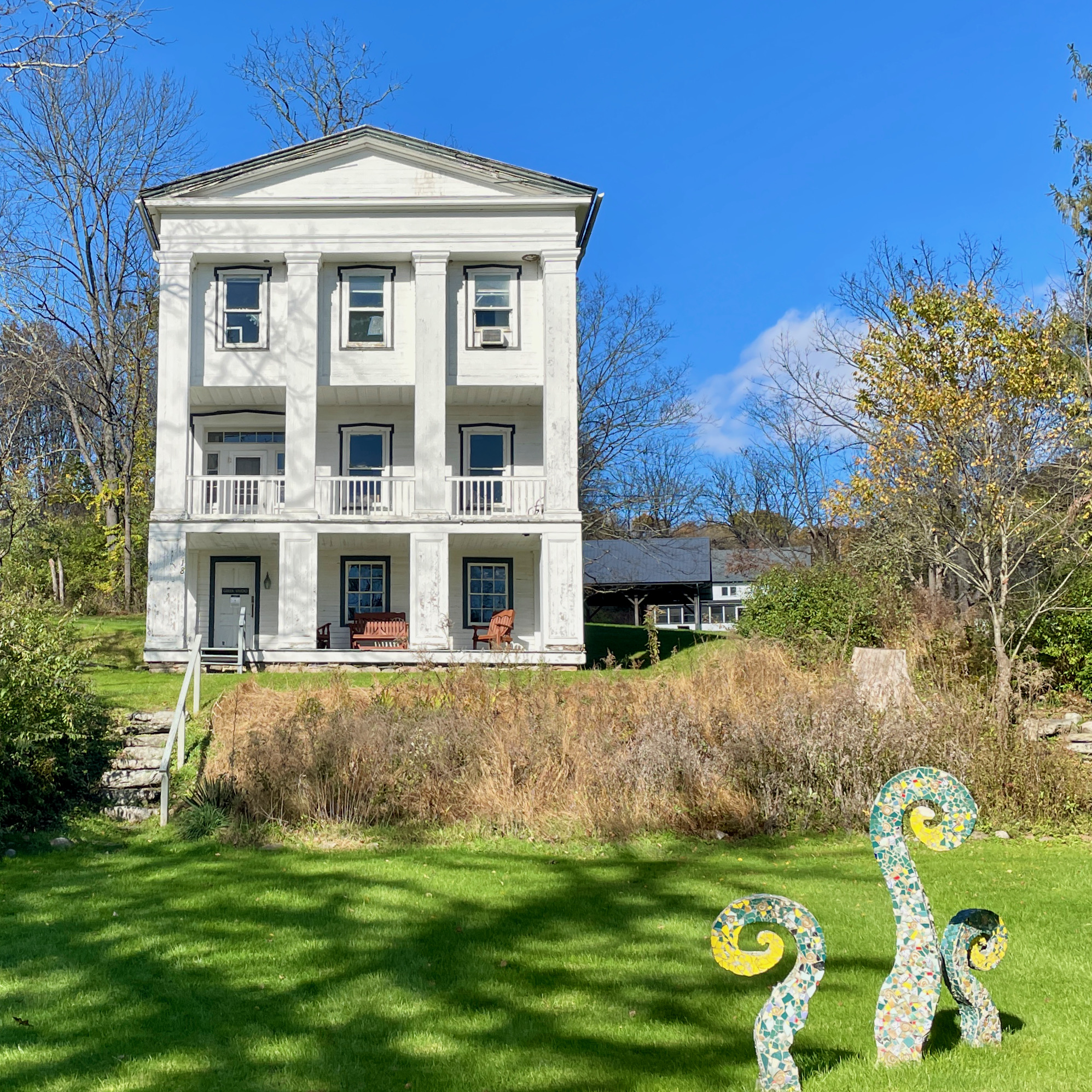
- Greek Revival House
- Area: 202 acres (82 ha)
- NRHP reference No.: 80000437
- NJRHP No.: 2624

Significant dates
- Added to NRHP: February 29, 1980
- Designated NJRHP: October 26, 1979

The Peters Valley Historic District is a 202-acre (82 ha) historic district encompassing the village. It was added to the National Register of Historic Places on February 29, 1980 for its significance in architecture and exploration/settlement. The district includes 17 contributing buildings. Built c. 1845, the Greek Revival House features a pedimented gable facade and four massive square columns.

== Gallery ==
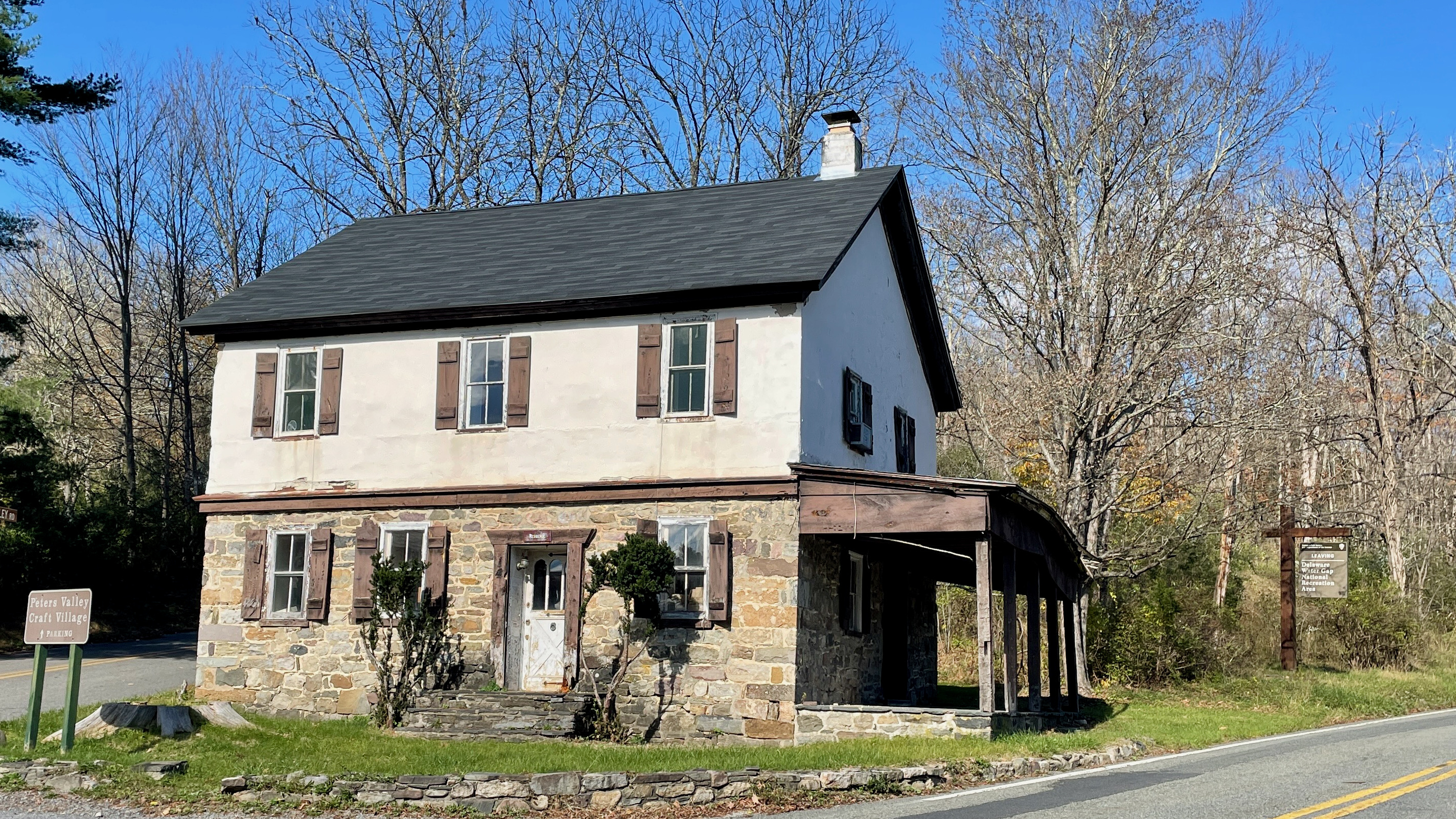
Old Dutch Reformed Church

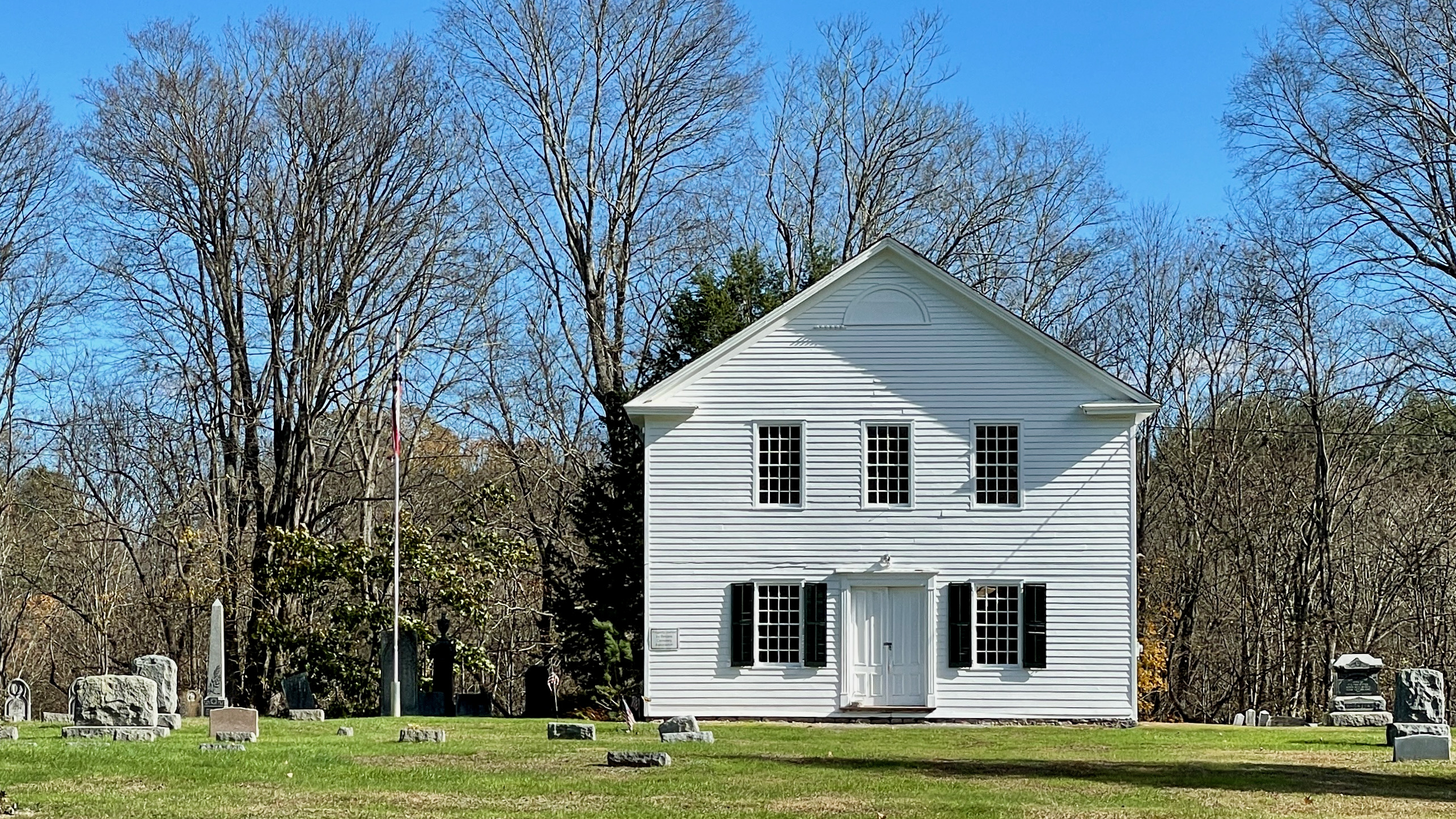
Dutch Reformed Church of Peters Valley

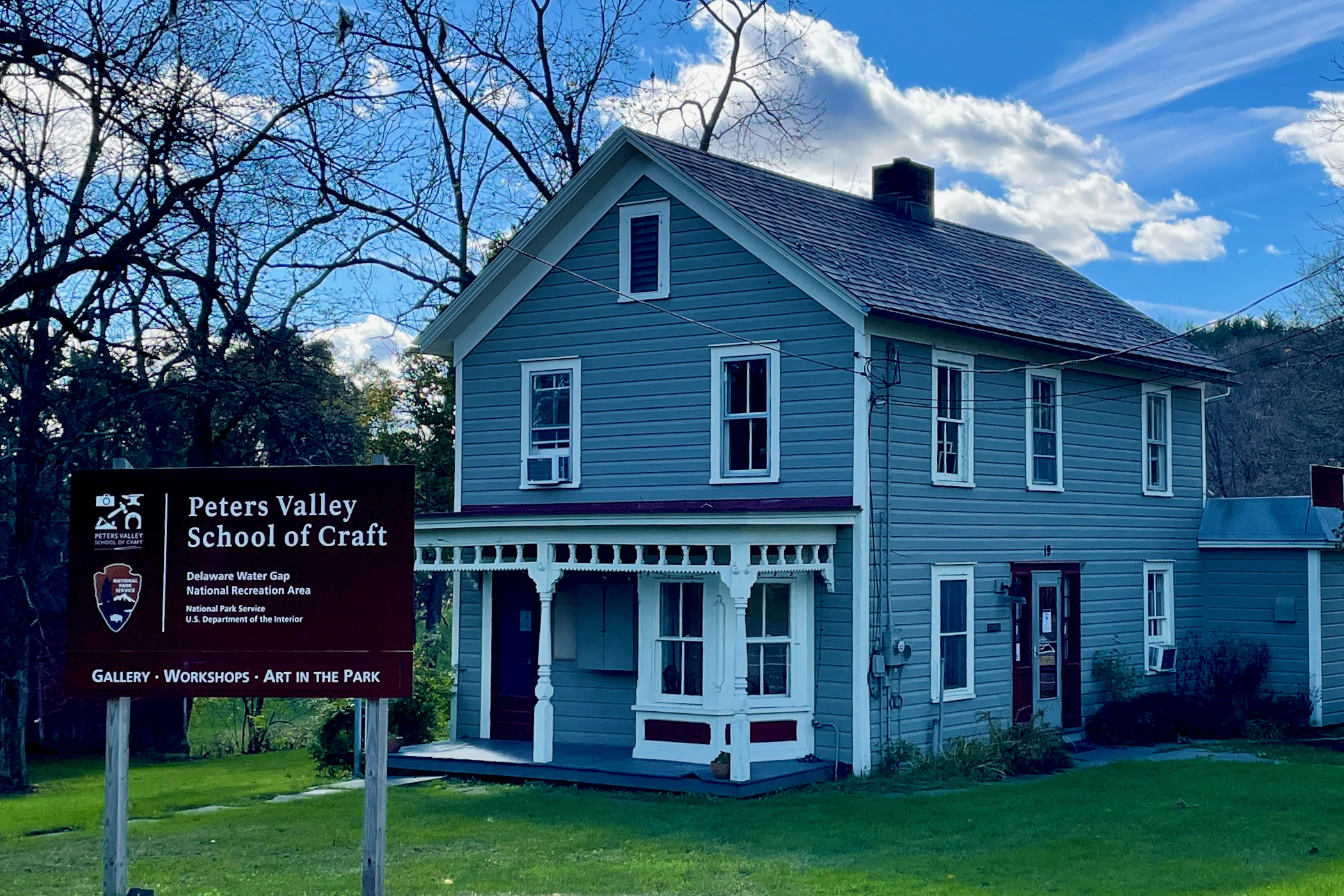
Peters Valley School of Craft

== See also ==
- National Register of Historic Places listings in Sussex County, New Jersey
