= Dingman's Ferry Bridge =

Dingmans Bridge
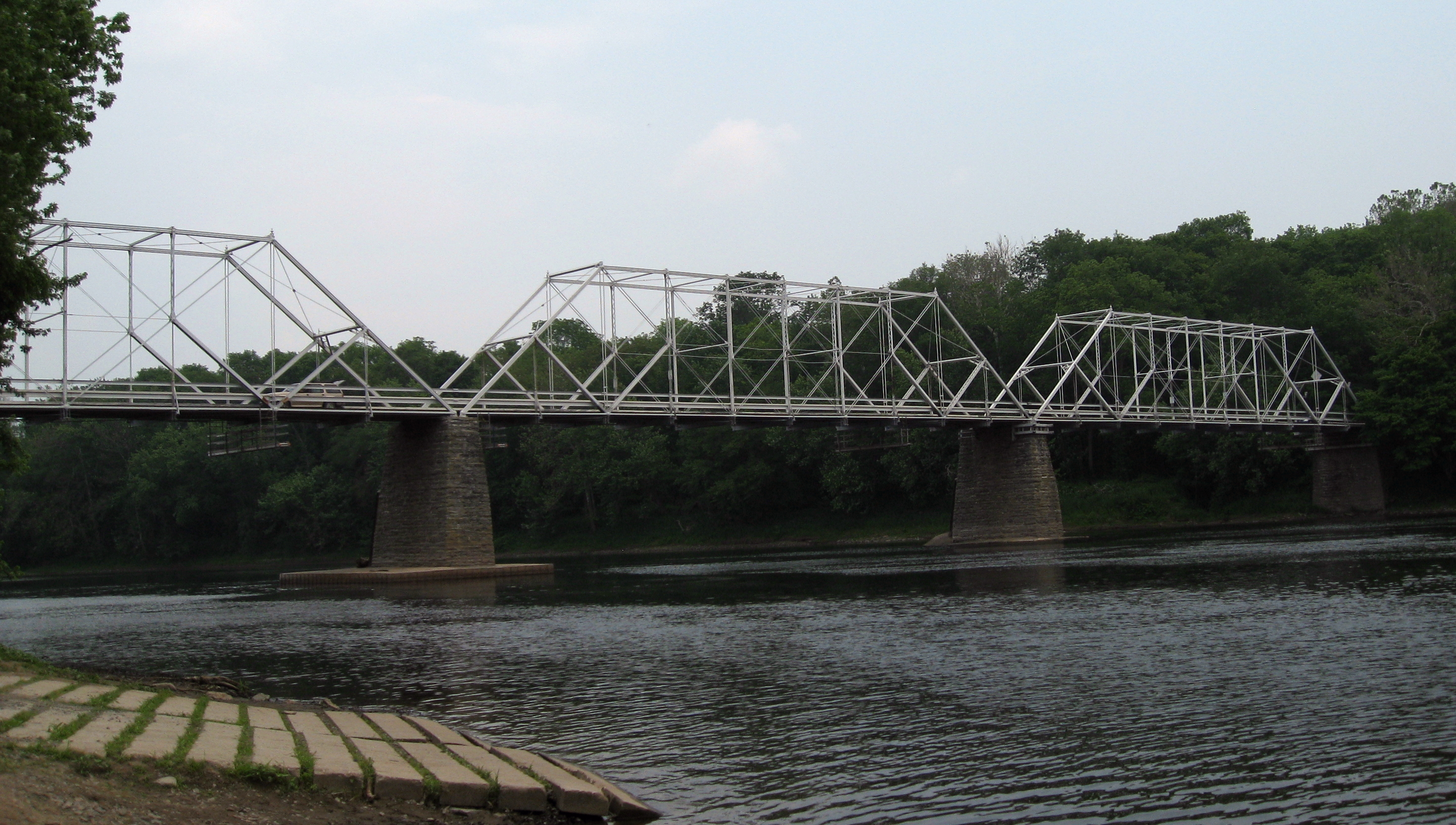
- Coordinates: 41.220070°N 74.859300°W
- Carries: PA 739 (PA side) / CR 560 (NJ side)
- Crosses: Delaware River
- Locale: Delaware Township, Pennsylvania and Sandyston Township, New Jersey
- Official name: Dingmans Bridge
- Other name(s): Dingmans Ferry Bridge
- Maintained by: Dingmans Choice and Delaware Bridge Company

Characteristics
- Design: Truss bridge
- Material: Wrought iron
- Total length: 530 feet (160 m)
- Width: 18 feet (5.5 m)
- Longest span: 170 feet (52 m)
- Clearance above: 11 feet (3.4 m)

History
- Opened: August 24, 1900

Statistics
- Toll: $2.00, both directions

The Dingman's Ferry Bridge (also known as the Dingmans Bridge) is a toll bridge across the Delaware River between Delaware Township, Pennsylvania and Sandyston Township, New Jersey. Owned and operated by the Dingmans Choice and Delaware Bridge Company, it is the last privately owned toll bridge on the Delaware and one of the few remaining in the United States. It is also the only bridge on the Delaware to toll traffic entering New Jersey.

The bridge lies south of the Milford–Montague Toll Bridge, and well north of the Delaware Water Gap Toll Bridge along Interstate 80. This crossing location is particularly useful for Pennsylvanians commuting to New Jersey or New York City.

== Operations ==
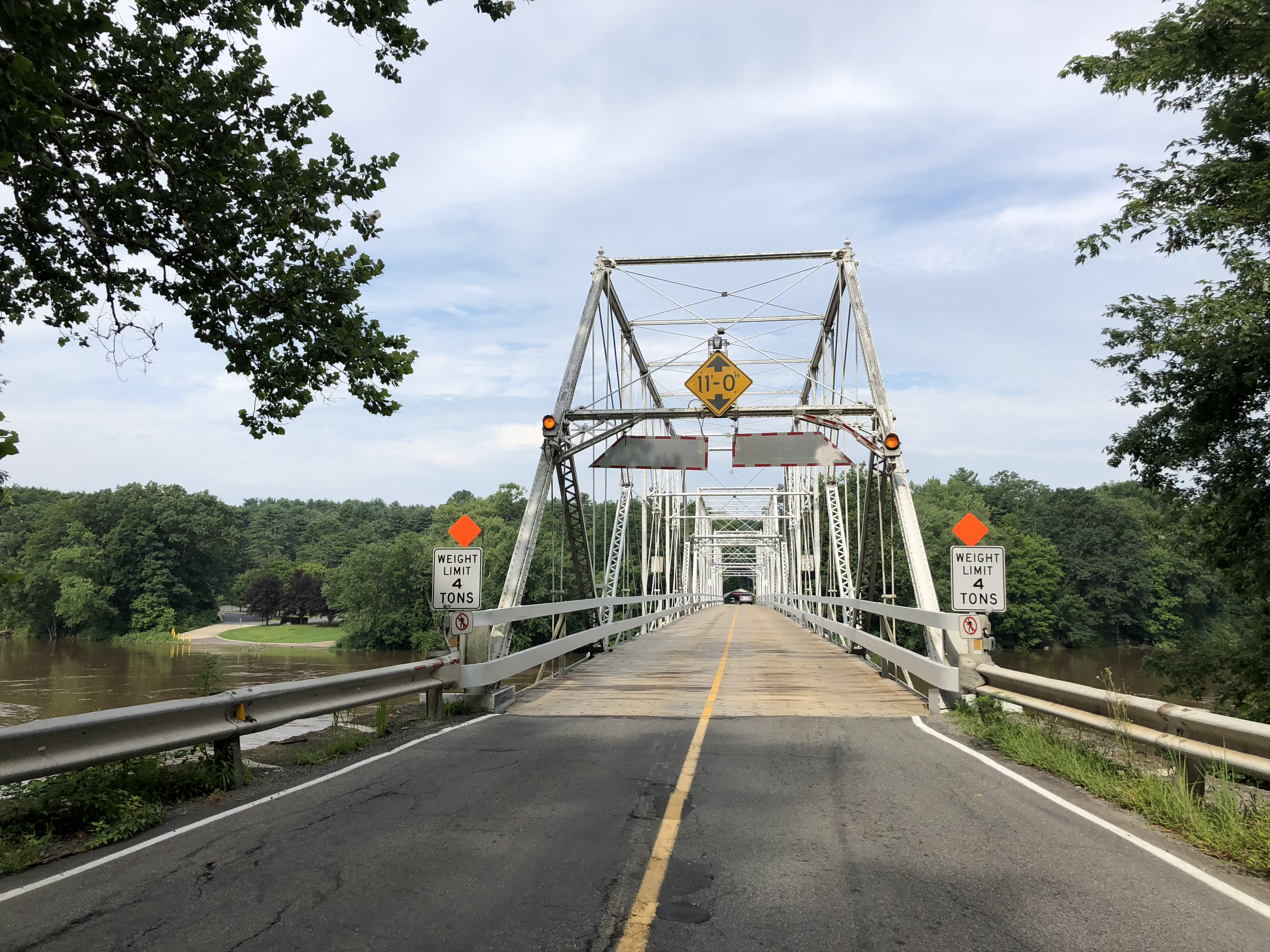
Dingman's Ferry Bridge from the New Jersey side

As of July 1, 2022, the toll for automobiles is $2.00 each way. Books of 40 tickets can be purchased from the toll collector for $40.00, effectively lowering the toll to $1.00 for frequent users. The bridge's toll booth, located on the Pennsylvania side, is staffed by a single toll collector who stands in between the two lanes of traffic, collecting toll fees by hand. No toll is charged on Christmas Day, when the booth is unattended.

Although the bridge is within the Delaware Water Gap National Recreation Area, government employees pay the toll, unless responding to an emergency with lights and sirens on. Bicyclists may cross for free, but pedestrians are not allowed due to the narrow lanes. An 11-foot (3.4 m) height restriction coupled with a weight restriction of four tons precludes large RVs and trucks from crossing.

Because the Bridge Company is responsible for its own repairs, it employs an engineering firm certified for bridge inspection to regularly and thoroughly inspect the bridge from the tops of the trusses to the underwater foundations. Each year, the bridge company closes the bridge the second week after Labor Day to conduct any repairs needed to maintain the structural integrity of the bridge and to replace or flip the salt-treated British Columbia fir planks. These floor boards are held in place with anchor plates and collar nails which results in a characteristic rattling of the deck with the traffic moving.

== History ==
=== Origins ===
In 1735, Andrew Dingman, a Dutch pioneer from Kinderhook, New York, operated a ferry that connected the Old Mine Road in Sussex County, New Jersey to the Bethany Turnpike (now U.S. Route 209) in Delaware Township in Pike County. The ferry thrived for over a century as pioneers utilized this important river crossing to move westward. Crossing on the ferry took some time; the ferryman on the western (Pennsylvania) bank had to be summoned by a bell on the eastern (New Jersey) shore. A house was built near the present-day bridge in 1803 by Judge Daniel W. Dingman, who was said to hold court in his bare feet. Still standing, the house is on the state and national historic registers.

=== First four bridges ===
In 1836, the first bridge was built by the Dingmans. Under the terms of its charter, churchgoers, schoolchildren, and funeral processions were given free passage, a condition that is still in effect today. The first bridge lasted until 1847 when high water washed away the Milford Bridge upstream and swept the debris into Dingman's Bridge.

After a brief life, the second bridge was destroyed four or five years after the first, in a severe windstorm.

A third bridge was constructed in 1856, but, being of poor quality, it fell apart by 1862. The ferry was operated once again by the Dingmans until the property was sold in 1875 to John W. Kilsby, Sr. Kilsby's family operated the ferry until the turn of the twentieth century when the current bridge was constructed using some materials recycled from a railroad bridge on the Susquehanna River. This bridge has survived major floods in 1903, 1955, 2005, and 2006.

=== Later years ===
Dingman named his original plot of land Dingman's Choice. The village of Dingman's Choice, which became quite identified with the ferry, had its name changed by the Post Office to Dingmans Ferry in 1868. Records from an early logbook show tolls of 40 cents for a horseless carriage, 25 cents for a two-horse wagon, 10 cents for a horse and rider, 5 cents for a bicycle, and 2 cents for a footman. Under the terms of the original charter, no toll was charged for individuals traveling to church or a funeral, a custom which is still practiced presently.

== See also ==
- List of bridges documented by the Historic American Engineering Record in New Jersey
- List of bridges documented by the Historic American Engineering Record in Pennsylvania
- List of crossings of the Delaware River
