= Lords Valley, Pennsylvania =

Unincorporated community in Pennsylvania, U.S.

Lords Valley is an unincorporated community in Blooming Grove Township, Pike County, Pennsylvania, United States. Lords Valley is about 12 miles (19 km) from Milford, 17 miles (27 km) from Hawley, 25 miles (40 km) from Honesdale, 20 miles (32 km) from Port Jervis, New York, 30 miles (48 km) from Stroudsburg, and 80 miles (130 km) from New York City. The Lords Valley zipcode is 18428.

== History ==
Lords Valley's first resident was Levi Lord in 1810, after Dr. Philip P. Monington advertised property available for development. Levi Lord and eleven friends purchased the property. Levi Lord built this house brick hotel with his sons, circa 1850, on the then Dingman Choice Turnpike (now route 739). The building, which was also a post office from 1953 - 1955, is owned by the Glen Eyre Corp. and is listed on the National Historical Register. The names of the other purchasers of the area property were Levi's friends, Joseph Brooks, Robert Hatton, Samuel Hunt, Wilson Croft, William Whittaker, John Whittaker, Thomas Harselden, Robert Ogden, Abram Johnson, James Powers and William Manly. They all came from England on the same ship in 1809.

== Hemlock Farms ==
Hemlock Farms Community Association (HFCA) is a 4,500-acre (18 km^{2}) gated community that spans from Pennsylvania State Routes 402 and 739. With a population of 3,271 residents, as of the 2010 census, it is the largest community within Lords Valley.

== Lords Valley Country Club ==
The Lords Valley Country Club (LVCC), is a private club, limited to 400 members, offering: an 18 hole golf course, 10 tennis courts, swimming, and dining facilities to its members. Although the country club is located within HFCA it is not associated with it, and its history pre-dates HFCA.

The LVCC was originally chartered in 1945 as Pocono Skyline Golf Club and was located at the Monomonock Inn, Barrett Township, Monroe County, PA. In 1954, after facing several financial issues, the club was renamed to Mountain Resorts and went into inactive status. In 1963 when Western Heritage purchased the HFCA they also signed a 20-year lease with Mountain Resorts, which changed its name to Lords Valley Country Club. In 1972 the LVCC exercised their right to purchase the land their country club is on.

The par 72 golf course was designed by Norman H. Woods and receives a 71.2 rating (from the championship tees).

== Lords Valley Cemetery ==
The former house of Levi Lord, now known as "The Lord House" is also the site of the Lords Valley Cemetery. Located on Rte. 739 (right side of house) and Blooming Grove Turnpike, with the 84 Lumber Co. just across the street, and Pike Co. Concrete Co., on the opposite corner. To be buried in the cemetery the deceased must have been a lifelong resident of Lords Valley.

The Lord House was added to the National Register of Historic Places in 1980.

== See also ==
- George W. Childs Recreation Site
- Bushkill Falls
- Hawley, Pennsylvania
