= Layton, New Jersey =

Populated place in Sussex County, New Jersey, US

- Census-designated place
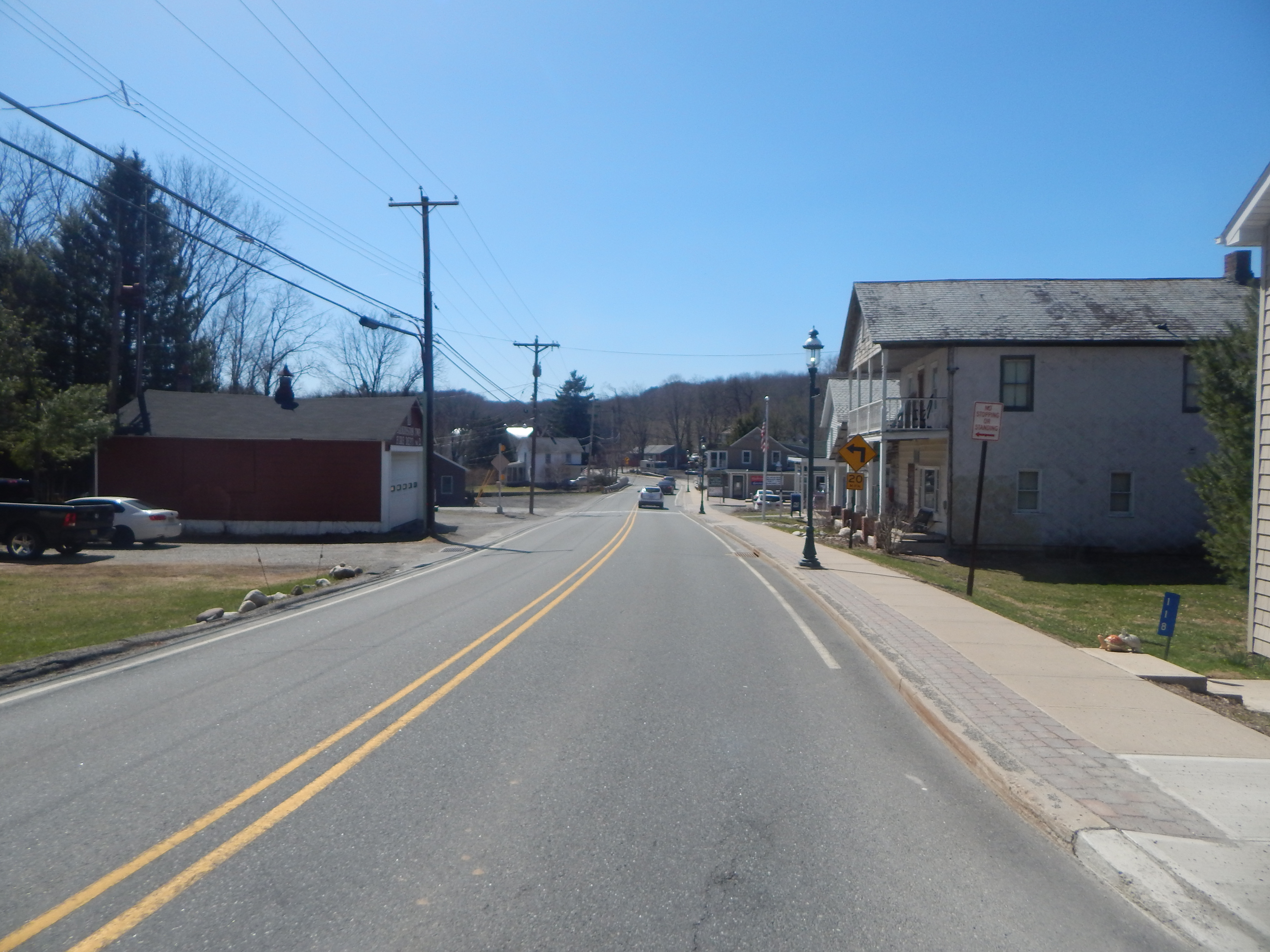
- Layton along County Route 560.

- Location in Sussex County Location in New Jersey Location in the United States
- Coordinates: 41°12′58″N 74°49′23″W
- Country: United States
- State: New Jersey
- County: Sussex
- Township: Sandyston
- Named for: John Layton

Area
  - Total: 6.99 sq mi (18.11 km^{2})
  - Land: 6.98 sq mi (18.07 km^{2})
  - Water: 0.015 sq mi (0.04 km^{2})
- Elevation: 574 ft (175 m)

Population (2020)
  - Total: 692
  - Density: 99.2/sq mi (38.29/km^{2})
- ZIP Code: 07826
- FIPS code: 34-39600
- GNIS feature ID: 0877713

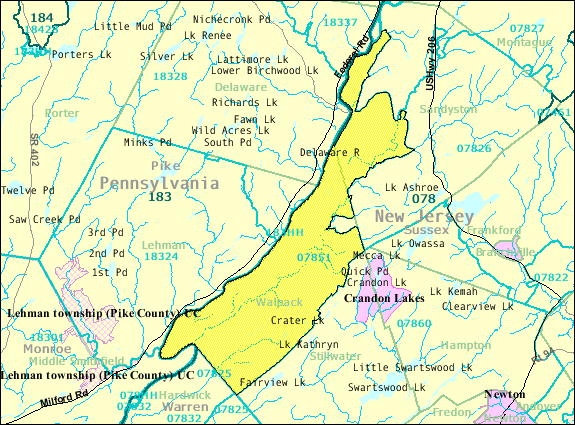
United States Census Bureau map of ZCTA 07851 Layton, New Jersey

Layton is an unincorporated community and census-designated place (CDP) located within Sandyston Township in Sussex County, in the U.S. state of New Jersey. The area is served as United States Postal Service ZIP Code 07851. As of the 2020 census, Layton had a population of 692.

Layton is located 574 feet (175 m) above sea level.

The Dingman's Ferry Bridge, crosses the Delaware River at Layton, connecting County Route 560 in New Jersey to PA 739 in Pennsylvania.

== Demographics ==
Historical population
Census	Pop.	Note	%±
2020	692		—
U.S. Decennial Census

Layton was first listed as a census designated place in the 2020 U.S. census.

Layton CDP, New Jersey – Racial and ethnic composition Note: the US Census treats Hispanic/Latino as an ethnic category. This table excludes Latinos from the racial categories and assigns them to a separate category. Hispanics/Latinos may be of any race.
Race / Ethnicity (NH = Non-Hispanic)	Pop 2020	2020
White alone (NH)	629	90.90%
Black or African American alone (NH)	6	0.87%
Native American or Alaska Native alone (NH)	0	0.00%
Asian alone (NH)	6	0.87%
Native Hawaiian or Pacific Islander alone (NH)	0	0.00%
Other race alone (NH)	0	0.00%
Mixed race or Multiracial (NH)	21	3.03%
Hispanic or Latino (any race)	30	4.34%
Total	692	100.00%

As of 2020, the population was 692.

== History ==
Layton was first settled around 1800 by John Layton and was known as Centreville, the settlement is located roughly in the middle of the township at the confluence of Layton-Bevans Road (County Route 640), Tuttles Corner-Dingmans Road (CR 560), and Layton-Hainesville Road (CR 645). The Little Flat Brook, which provided a source of power for early mills, runs through the middle of the village. Simeon Fisher, a blacksmith, is noted to be the first to open a business at this site, followed by Abraham Bell, who had a carpenter's shop and a tavern. In 1835, Squire Layton established a store that served the residents of the community and travels alike. By 1860, the hamlet had significantly expanded to include a Methodist church, two stores, a post office, a tannery, a blacksmith shop, a cooperage shop, a sawmill, a small shop, a gristmill, a hotel, and more than fifteen dwellings. Shortly after that date, a one-room schoolhouse was erected in the hamlet.

In 1861, John B. Layton petitioned Washington, D.C. for mail delivery. The petition was in the name of Centerville, but that name was already being used by another community in the state. The name "Laytons" was assigned to this area, named for Layton who had put forth the petition. The name was later changed by the Post Office Department by dropping the 's'.

In 1906, the State Industrial Directory reported the settlement to include a gristmill, a creamery owned by Siler & Company, several residences, and population to be about one hundred. The number of residents declined to sixty by 1915. "The village occupies an exceptionally fine location with regard to healthfulness of climate and beauty of scenery. It is only two miles from the Delaware River, and a short distance from several small but fine lakes, the waters of which come from mountain streams. The elevation is 550 feet over sea level. Fish abound in all the waters about the village, and every other feature of healthful, picturesque country life, on which people who leave the cities during the summer months set a high value, are found here."

== Climate ==
This climatic region is typified by large seasonal temperature differences, with warm to hot (and often humid) summers and cold (sometimes severely cold) winters. According to the Köppen Climate Classification system, Layton has a humid continental climate, abbreviated "Dfb" on climate maps.

== Notable people ==
People who were born in, residents of, or otherwise closely associated with Layton include:

- George B. Harper (1918–1988), politician who served in the New Jersey Senate from 1954 to 1964.
- Harry Harper (1895–1963), pitcher who played in the major leagues for four different teams.
