= List of county routes in Sussex County, New Jersey =

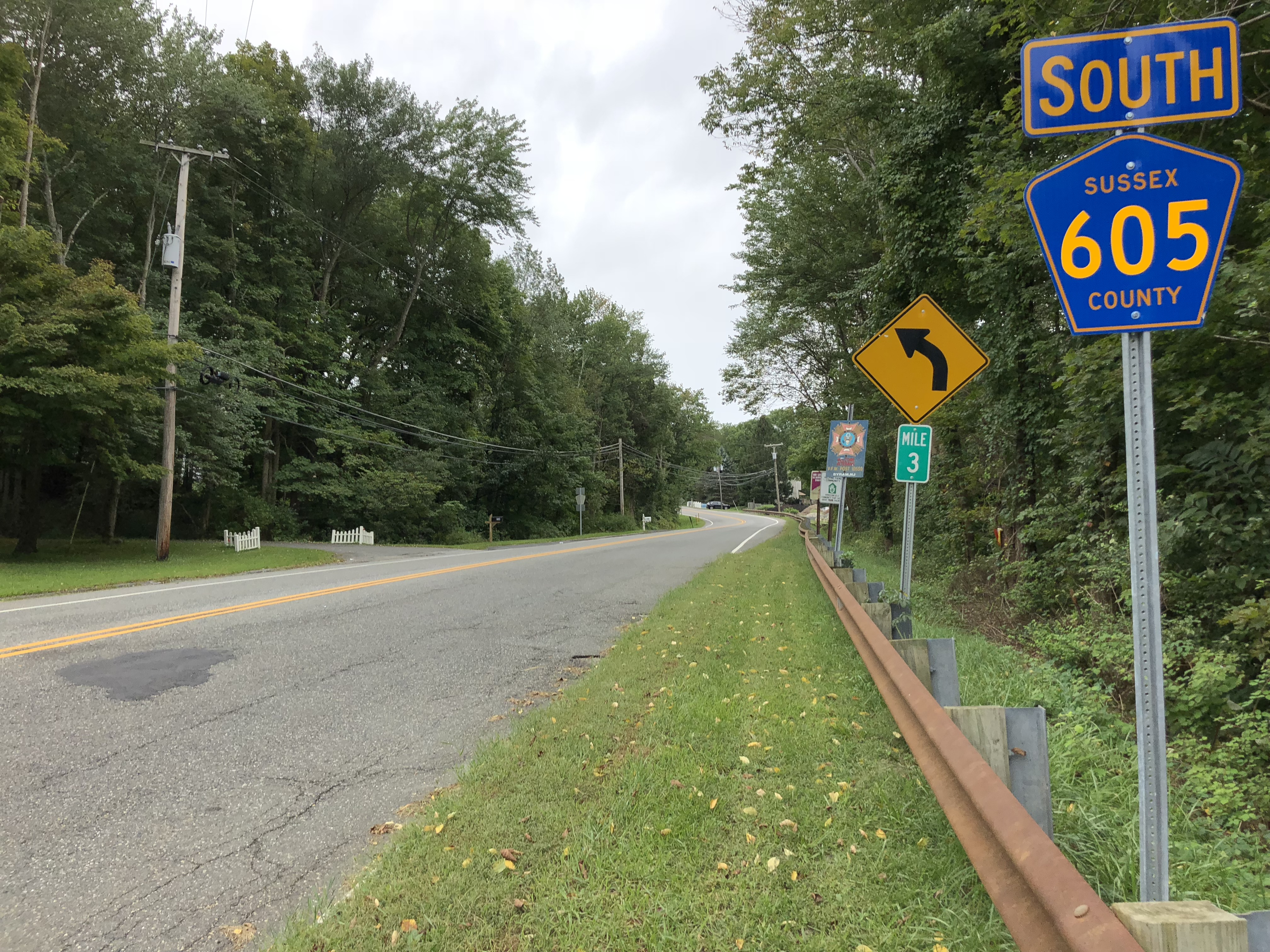
CR 605 (Stanhope-Sparta Road) southbound in Hopatcong

The following is a list of county routes in Sussex County in the U.S. state of New Jersey. For more information on the county route system in New Jersey as a whole, including its history, see County routes in New Jersey.

== 500-series county routes ==
In addition to those listed below, the following 500-series county routes serve Sussex County:

- CR 515, CR 517, CR 519, CR 521, CR 560, CR 565

== Other county routes ==
Route	Length (mi)	Length (km)	From	Via	To	Notes
CR 601	0.59	0.95	Ledgewood Avenue (Route 183) in Stanhope	Main Street	Route 183 in Stanhope	Unsigned
CR 602	2.89	4.65	Route 183 in Stanhope	Brooklyn Road, Willis Avenue, Brooklyn–Stanhope Road	Lakeside Boulevard (CR 607) in Hopatcong	
CR 603	4.59	7.39	Decker Pond Road (CR 517) in Green Township	Airport Road, Pequest Road, Brighton Road	US 206 in Andover Township	
CR 604	2.90	4.67	Waterloo Road (CR 604) at the Warren County line in Byram Township	Waterloo Road	US 206 in Byram Township	
CR 605	8.51	13.70	Stanhope border in Hopatcong	Sparta–Stanhope Road, Stanhope Road	Woodport Road (Route 181) in Sparta	
CR 606	1.22	1.96	Brighton Road (CR 603) and Pequest Road (CR 603) in Green Township	Brighton Road, High Street	US 206 in Andover	Partial access only to/from CR 517 (left turns from CR 517 north to CR 606 west and turns from CR 606 east to CR 517 provided via US 206)
CR 607	9.38	15.10	US 206 in Byram Township	Lackawanna Drive, Maxim Drive, Riverstyx Road, Lakeside Boulevard	Lakeside Boulevard (CR 602) at the Morris County line in Hopatcong	
CR 608	1.88	3.03	Wintermute Road (CR 519) and Ridge Road (CR 519) on the Fredon/Green township line	Shotwell Road	Wolfs Corner Road (CR 611) in Green Township	
CR 609	2.69	4.33	Maxim Drive (CR 607) in Hopatcong	Indian Trail, Lakeside Avenue	Northwood Road at the Morris County line in Hopatcong	
CR 610	3.95	6.36	Maple Avenue (CR 521) and Stillwater Road (CR 521) in Stillwater Township	Main Street, Fredon Road, Stillwater Road	Route 94 in Fredon Township	
CR 611	6.60	10.62	Decker Pond Road (CR 517) in Green Township	Kennedy Road, Wolfs Corner Road, Greendale Road	US 206 in Andover Township	
CR 612	0.83	1.34	CR 521 in Stillwater Township	Pond Brook Road	East Shore Drive (CR 619) in Stillwater Township	
CR 613	7.24	11.65	Lenape Road (CR 517) in Andover	Andover–Mohawk Road, East Shore Trail, Mohawk Avenue	Woodport Road (Route 181) in Sparta	
CR 614	1.47	2.37	Stillwater township line in Fredon Township	Paulinskill Lake Road	Route 94 in Fredon Township	
CR 615	0.70	1.13	NPS Route 615 in Sandyston Township	Kuhn Road	Bevans Road (CR 640) in Sandyston Township	
CR 616	5.09	8.19	Spring Street in Newton	Sparta Avenue, Newton–Sparta Road	Andover Road (CR 517) and Sparta Avenue (CR 517) in Sparta	
CR 617	8.99	14.47	Stillwater Road (CR 521) in Stillwater Township	Fairview Lake Road, Owassa Road, Mt Benevolence Road, Mountain Road	Kemah Mecca Lake Road (CR 521) and Mountain Road (CR 521) in Hampton Township	
CR 618	2.71	4.36	Route 94 in Fredon Township	Willows Road, Fredon–Springdale Road	US 206 in Andover Township	
CR 619	3.69	5.94	Fredon Road (CR 610) and Stillwater Road (CR 610) in Stillwater Township	East Shore Drive	Swartswood Road (CR 622) in Hampton Township	
CR 620	5.44	8.75	Main Street (CR 517) in Sparta	Main Street, Glen Road	Ridge Road at the Morris County line in Sparta	
CR 621	0.49	0.79	US 206 in Newton	Woodside Avenue	Sparta Avenue (CR 616) in Newton	
CR 622	5.35	8.61	CR 521 in Stillwater Township	Swartswood Road	Mill Street (CR 519) in Newton	
CR 623	4.38	7.05	Newton–Sparta Road (CR 616) in Andover Township	Lawrence Road, Sunset Inn Road	Route 15 and Route 94 in Lafayette Township	
CR 626	3.74	6.02	Kemah Mecca Lake Road (CR 521) in Hampton Township	Halsey Road	US 206 in Hampton Township	
CR 627	1.56	2.51	Halsey Road (CR 626) in Hampton Township	Branchville–Lawson Road	Morris Turnpike (CR 519/CR 655) and Newton Avenue (CR 519) in Frankford Township	
CR 628	2.85	4.59	CR 519 in Wantage Township	Branchville–Lewisburg Road	Compton Road (CR 565) and Loomis Avenue (CR 639) in Wantage Township	
CR 629	5.54	8.92	Wantage Avenue (CR 519) in Frankford Township	Wykertown Road	Wantage Avenue (CR 519) in Wantage Township	
CR 630	3.27	5.26	US 206 in Frankford Township	Old Union Turnpike, Main Street, Broad Street	US 206 in Frankford Township	
CR 631	2.66	4.28	Route 23 in Franklin	Franklin Avenue, Church Street, Fowler Street, North Church Road	Route 94 in Hardyston Township	
CR 632	0.25	0.40	Route 94 in Hamburg	Wallkill Avenue	Route 23 in Hamburg	Unsigned
CR 633	3.05	4.91	Kemah Mecca Lake Road (CR 521) in Hampton Township	Fairview Avenue, Kemah Lake Road	US 206 in Branchville	
CR 635	3.77	6.07	Wykertown Road (CR 629) in Frankford Township	Haggerty Road	Branchville–Lewisburg Road (CR 628) in Wantage Township	
CR 636	3.29	5.29	US 206 in Sandyston Township	Upper North Shore Road	Wantage Avenue (CR 519) in Frankford Township	
CR 637	2.37	3.81	Ross Corner–Sussex Road (CR 565) in Wantage Township	Beemer Church Road	Wykertown Road (CR 629) in Frankford Township	
CR 638	2.37	3.81	CR 515 in Vernon	Highland Lakes Road	Breakneck Road in Vernon	
CR 639	1.43	2.30	Compton Road (CR 565) and Branchville–Lewisburg Road (CR 628) in Wantage Township	Loomis Avenue	Mill Street (Route 23) in Sussex	
CR 640	1.34	2.16	Kuhn Road (CR 615) in Sandyston Township	Bevans Road	Tuttles Corner–Dingmans Road (CR 560) in Sandyston Township	
CR 641	1.24	2.00	McAfee–Glenwood Road (CR 517) in Vernon	Drew Mountain Road	Glenwood Road (CR 565) in Vernon	
CR 642	2.19	3.52	Route 284 in Wantage Township	Bassets Bridge Road, Owens Station Road	Lake Wallkill Road in Vernon	
CR 643	0.34	0.55	Loomis Avenue (Route 23) and Hamburg Avenue (Route 23) in Sussex	Main Street	Route 23 in Sussex	Unsigned
CR 644	1.41	2.27	McAfee–Glenwood Road (CR 517) in Vernon	Vernon Crossing	Route 94 in Vernon	
CR 645	3.85	6.20	Tuttles Corner–Dingmans Road (CR 560) in Sandyston Township	Layton–Hainesville Road	US 206/CR 521 in Sandyston Township	
CR 646	1.58	2.54	Old Mine Road in Sandyston Township	Jager Road	Layton–Hainesville Road (CR 645) in Sandyston Township	
CR 648	0.63	1.01	Lawrence Road (CR 623) and Sunset Inn Road (CR 623) in Lafayette Township	Randazzo Road	Limecrest Road (CR 669) in Sparta	
CR 649	1.73	2.78	Wantage Avenue (CR 519) in Wantage Township	Lusscroft Road	Colesville–Lusscroft Road (CR 519) in Wantage Township	Decommissioned in 2008
CR 650	12.86	20.70	US 206 and River Road (CR 521) in Montague Township	Deckertown Turnpike, Libertyville Road	Route 23 in Wantage Township	
CR 651	4.64	7.47	Route 23 in Wantage Township	Unionville Road	Unionville Road (CR 36) at the New York state line in Wantage Township	
CR 652	0.75	1.21	Layton–Hainesville Road (CR 645) in Sandyston Township	Lertora Road	US 206/CR 521 in Sandyston Township	
CR 653	7.25	11.67	US 206/CR 521 in Montague Township	Clove Road	Route 23 in Montague Township	
CR 654	0.15	0.24	Layton–Hainesville Road (CR 645) in Sandyston Township	McHugh Spur	US 206/CR 521 in Sandyston Township	
CR 655	2.65	4.26	Morris Turnpike (CR 519), Newton Avenue (CR 519), and Brannchville–Lawson Road (CR 627) in Frankford Township	Morris Turnpike	Old Union Turnpike (CR 630) in Frankford Township	
CR 656	0.57	0.92	US 206 in Sandyston Township	Shaytown Road	Cemetery Road (CR 675) in Sandyston Township	
CR 657	0.17	0.27	Route 23 in Hamburg	Main Street	Route 94 in Hamburg	Unsigned
CR 659	0.43	0.69	Route 94 in Lafayette Township	Morris Farm Road	Route 15 in Lafayette Township	Unsigned
CR 661	7.56	12.17	Route 15 in Lafayette Township	Beaver Run Road	Route 94 in Hardyston Township	
CR 663	4.38	7.05	Sparta Avenue (CR 616) in Newton	Hicks Avenue, Warbasse Junction Road	Route 94 in Lafayette Township	
CR 665	0.66	1.06	Lake Wallkill Road in Vernon	Bassetts Bridge Road	Bassetts Bridge Road (CR 642) and Owens Station Road (CR 642) in Vernon	
CR 667	2.10	3.38	Glenwood Road (CR 565) in Vernon	Lake Wallkill Road	Glen Road West in Vernon	
CR 669	7.73	12.44	U.S. Route 206 in Andover	Limecrest Road, Houses Corner Road	Route 15 in Sparta	
CR 671	1.91	3.07	Stanhope–Sparta Road (CR 605) in Byram Township	Amity Road, Lee Hill Road	Andover–Mohawk Road (CR 613) and East Shore Trail (CR 613) in Byram Township	
CR 673	1.28	2.06	Beaver Run Road (CR 661) in Hardyston Township	Grumm Road, Blair Road	Route 23 in Wantage Township	
CR 675	3.75	6.04	Layton–Hainesville Road (CR 645) in Sandyston Township	Degroat Road, Cemetery Road, New Road	Deckertown Turnpike (CR 650) in Montague Township	
