= Jonathan Hampton =

American colonial surveyor, merchant and officer

- Born: 1712
- Died: November 1, 1777 (aged 64–65); Elizabethtown, New Jersey
- Military career
- Allegiance: Province of New Jersey
- Unit: New Jersey Frontier Guard
- Conflicts: French and Indian War
- Other work: Colonial surveyor, merchant, and militia officer

Jonathan Hampton (1712 – November 1, 1777) was an American colonial surveyor, merchant, and militia officer involved with New Jersey's frontier fortifications and defenses along the Delaware River during the French and Indian War.

In 1755, Royal Governor Jonathan Belcher and the colonial legislature authorized the construction of stone blockhouse fortifications along the colony's Delaware River frontier to defend against raids by American Indian groups allied with the French as hostilities escalated during the French and Indian War. The act authorizing these fortifications also appointed Hampton as the victualler and paymaster of a military unit, the New Jersey Frontier Guard, to man these forts. To supply these troops, Hampton built the Military Road linking the provincial capital at Elizabethtown with Morristown and the Delaware River valley (then called the Minisink) in 1756–1757. This road followed American Indian trails and became the route of subsequent roads, including the Union Turnpike and present-day New Jersey Route 10, U.S. Route 206, and County Route 519. The Military Road's western terminus was at the Old Mine Road, an old road following the Delaware and Neversink River valleys between Esopus (now Kingston) in Ulster County, New York, and the Delaware Water Gap. Hampton established a large headquarters fort, Fort Johns, on the hillside overlooking the "Shapanack Flats" section of the Delaware valley near the Van Campen's Inn in Walpack Township.

Hampton owned many large tracts of land in Sussex County's Paulins Kill valley. Shortly after the creation of the county, Hampton offered several acres from these tracts to the county for the building of a courthouse (built 1762–1765) and a public green. Nearby, he offered tracts for a proposed school, and to the Anglicans for a church and parsonage for the local rector.

Hampton was a Freemason; however, he is often incorrectly conflated with the Jonathan Hampton of New York City who donated the altar bible, now known as the George Washington Inaugural Bible, to St. John's Lodge No. 1 after a fire in 1770. Hampton was part of a group of petitioners to the Grand Lodge of Massachusetts in 1762 who had applied to form a lodge at Elizabethtown. This petition was granted on January 24, 1762, with the lodge becoming Temple Lodge No. 1.

Hampton died November 1, 1777, in Elizabethtown, reportedly while celebrating news of Burgoyne's surrender at Saratoga two weeks earlier.

The Sussex County municipality of Hampton Township was named in his honor.
