= Van Campen's Inn =

- Isaac Van Campen Inn
- U.S. Historic district – Contributing property
- New Jersey Register of Historic Places
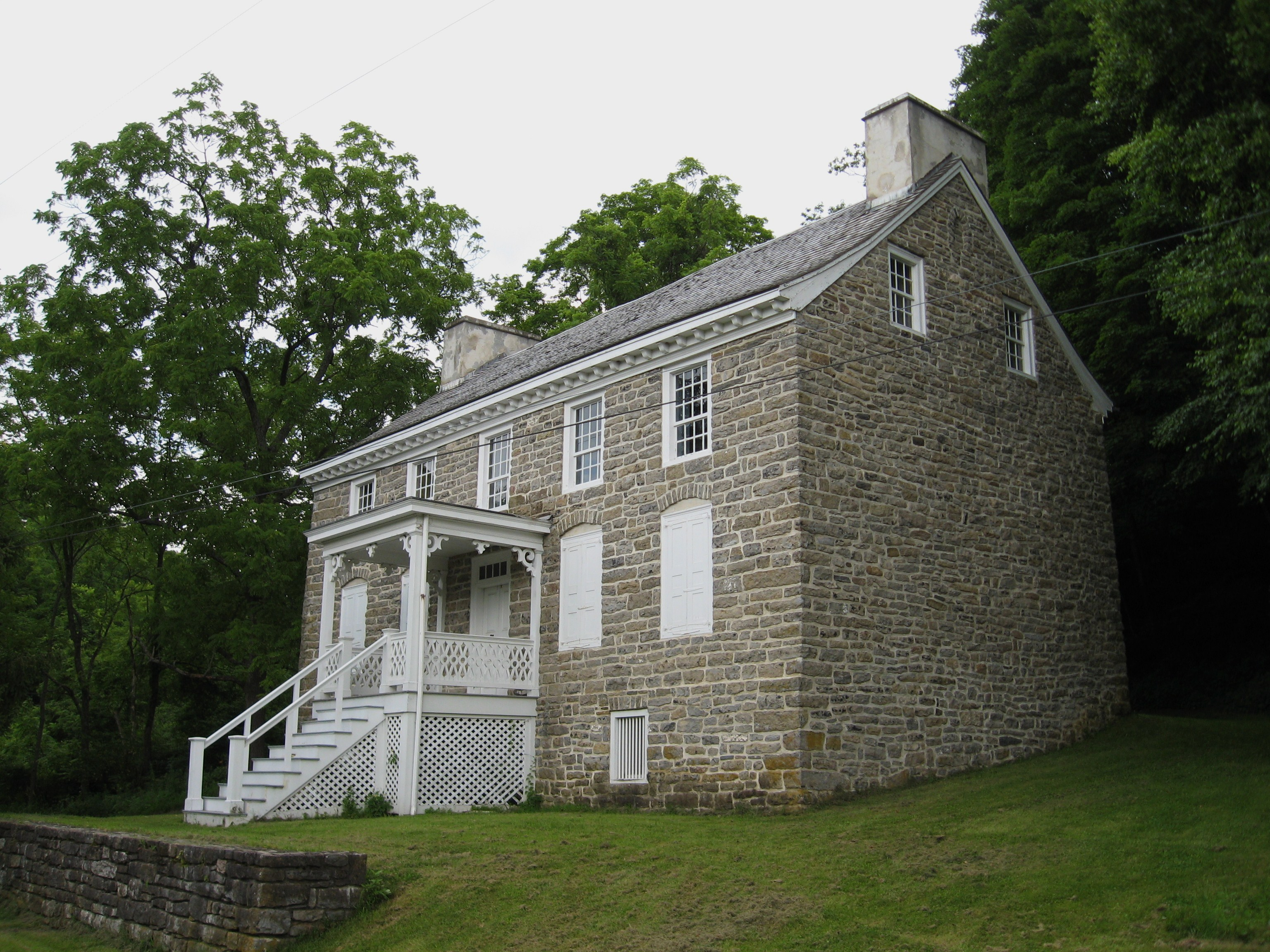
- Van Campen Inn in 2009

- Location within Sussex County, New Jersey Location within New Jersey Location within the United States
- Location: Old Mine Road; Walpack Township
- Coordinates: 41°9′52.5″N 74°53′31″W
- Part of: Old Mine Road Historic District (ID80000410)
- NJRHP No.: 2644

Significant dates
- Designated CP: December 3, 1980
- Designated NJRHP: October 24, 1975

Van Campen's Inn or Isaac Van Campen Inn is a fieldstone residence that was used as a yaugh house during the American colonial era. Located in Walpack Township, Sussex County, New Jersey along the Delaware River, it is a historic site located along the Old Mine Road in the Delaware Water Gap National Recreation Area. It is operated under a memorandum of understanding between the National Park Service and the Walpack Historical Society, a local non-profit corporation.

== History ==
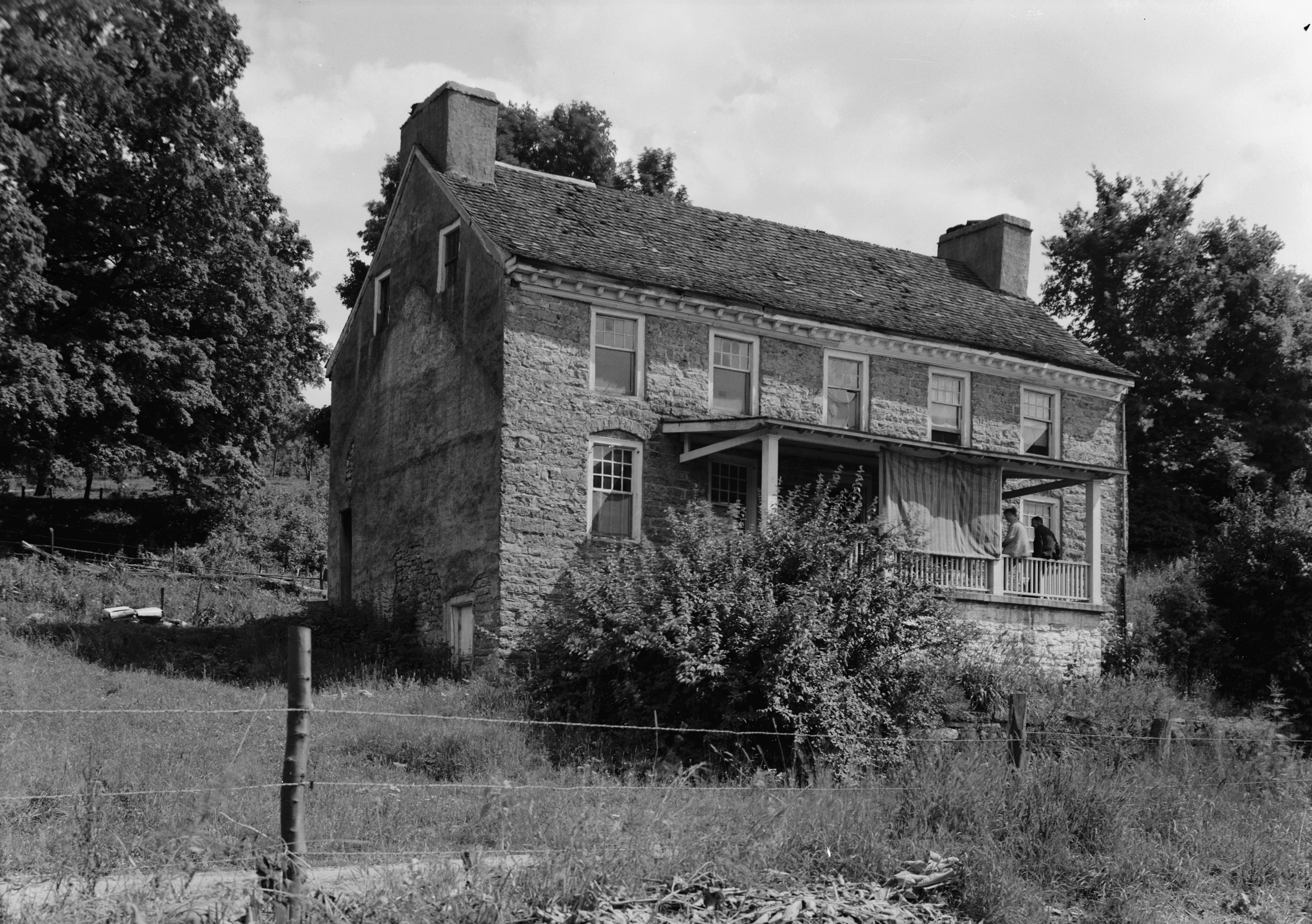
HABS photo from 1937

The Rosenkrans family, a Dutch family from the Hudson Valley in New York, settled in the Minisink circa 1730. It acquired a large tract of land along the Shapanack Flats section of the Delaware River in 1742. Harmon Rosenkrans is believed to have built the first section of the house shortly after (most sources stated 1746). This section, the "kitchen wing" was located on the north end of the house.

In 1754, Rosenkrans sold the property and the small house to his brother-in-law Isaac Van Campen who had married Magdalena Rosenkrans. Van Campen built the larger, main section of the house. Today this later wing is the extant structure. The older "kitchen wing" was torn down in 1917.

The house was added to the National Register of Historic Places in 1980 as a contributing property to the Old Mine Road Historic District. The National Park Service authorized a substantial restoration and reconstruction of the Van Campen Inn beginning in 1981. This restoration involved dismantling two-thirds of the front and side walls of the house, constructing new foundations, stabilizing the rear walls, and replacing interior wood structural beams. It was completed in 1984 by local stonemason Clarence Sharp (1923–2002).

While it is called an "inn", it is more accurately a "yaugh house"—a rural residence in a remote area that was licensed under colonial law to provide food and shelter to travellers. During the French & Indian War (1754–1763), the Van Campen's Inn "provided a safe haven when settlers fled for protection from Indian attack." According to the National Park Service, in November 1763, 150 settlers sought shelter in the "stout walls" of the house against the threat of Indian attack. During the American Revolution, John Adams is said to have rested the night at Van Campen's Inn while travelling from Massachusetts to Philadelphia for the Continental Congress. According to the National Park Service, "In a December snowstorm in 1776, several regiments under General Horatio Gates marched south via Old Mine Road past this point and camped overnight on Shapanack Flats in front of Van Campen Inn. They then continued south to join General Washington in the Battle of Trenton." Brigadier General Pulaski, a Polish count, and his command of 250 cavalry soldiers wintered here in 1778. Van Campen served in the state legislature from 1782–1785.

The Van Campen's Inn site had a Dutch colonial-style barn with characteristic large, "steep roofed" inward-swinging double doors, gable ends, smaller animal doors (one for horses, another for dairy cows). It was built across the road from the inn circa 1811 by Henry DeWitt and John H. DeWitt of Rochester, Ulster County NY, who purchased the property from Abraham Van Campen in 1811. This structure was destroyed by arson in the 1971.

The ruins of Fort Johns, a fortification built during the French & Indian War, is located on the nearby hillside overlooking the property. Fort Johns was the headquarters of the New Jersey Frontier Guard, and the largest of a series of a dozen forts built to defend frontier settlers along the Delaware River by New Jersey's colonial government during that war, which lasted 1754 to 1763. It was located at the terminus of Jonathan Hampton's Military Road built in 1755–1756 from the colony's capital Elizabethtown (now Elizabeth, New Jersey) to Morristown to supply the colony's fortifications in the Minisink. Today, the 1.6-mile long section of the Military Road traversing Walpack Ridge has been restored by the National Park Service as the "Military Trail" from Walpack Centre; it ends at the Old Mine Road a half-mile north of Van Campen's Inn. Driving between these two points on public roads requires a journey of ten miles.

== See also ==
- Tocks Island Dam Controversy
- List of the oldest buildings in New Jersey
