= Old Mine Road Historic District =

Historic district in New Jersey, United States

- U.S. National Register of Historic Places
- U.S. Historic district
- New Jersey Register of Historic Places
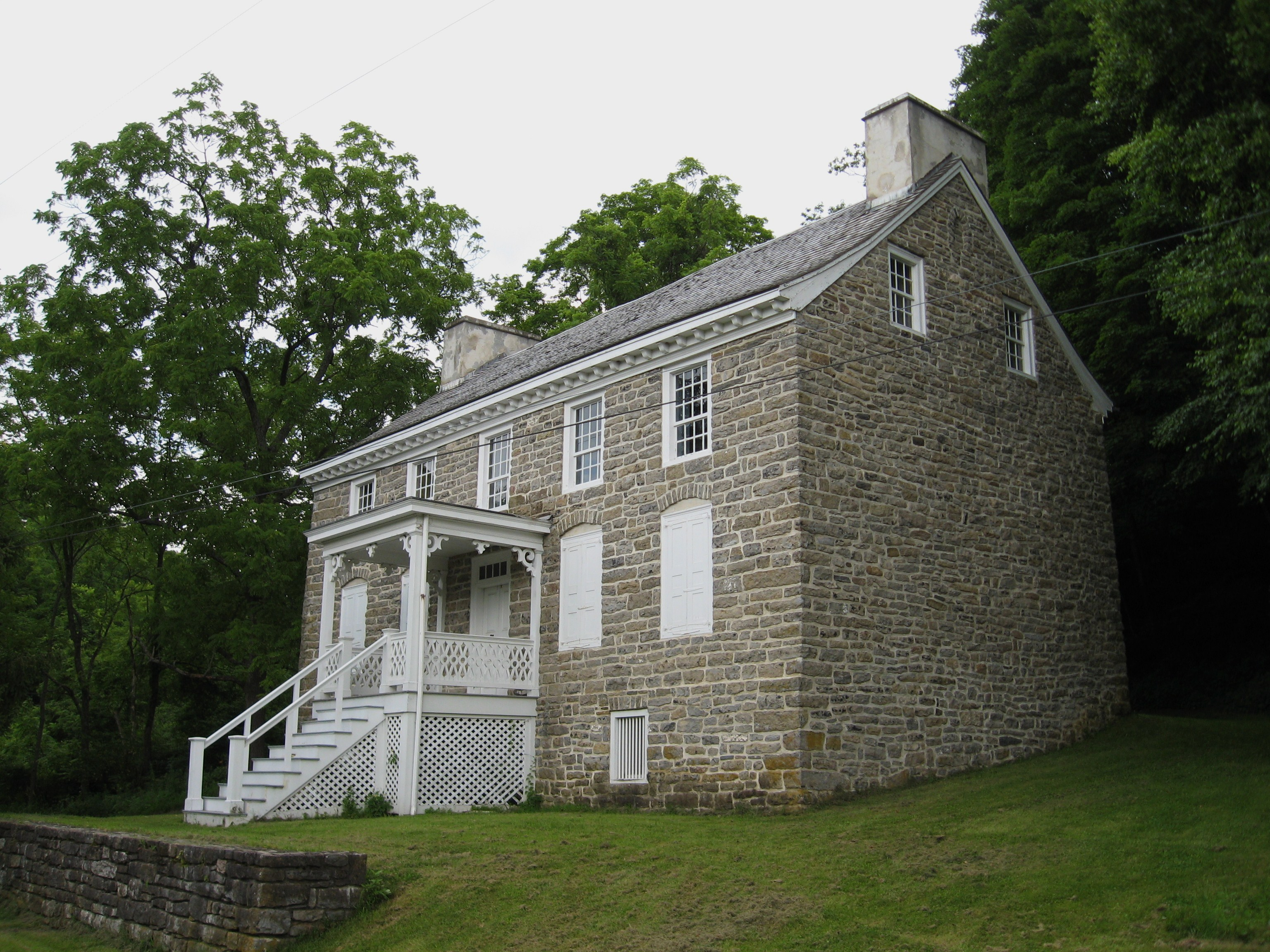
- Van Campen's Inn

- Location within Sussex County, New Jersey Location within Warren County, New Jersey Location within New Jersey Location within the United States
- Coordinates: 41°5′20″N 74°57′40″W
- Area: 687 acres (278 ha)
- Architectural style: Early Republic, Late Victorian, Early Colonial Dutch
- NRHP reference No.: 80000410
- NJRHP No.: 2608

Significant dates
- Added to NRHP: December 3, 1980
- Designated NJRHP: October 2, 1975

The Old Mine Road Historic District is a 687-acre (278 ha) historic district located along Old Mine Road in Sussex County and Warren County, New Jersey. It is part of the Delaware Water Gap National Recreation Area. The district was added to the National Register of Historic Places on December 3, 1980, for its significance in agriculture, archaeology, architecture, commerce, exploration/settlement, and transportation. It includes 24 contributing buildings and five contributing sites.

== History and description ==
The Old Mine Road is a 104-mile (167 km) long stretch of roads that connect from the Hudson River by Kingston, New York to the Delaware River in Sussex and Warren counties. This district is a linear district along a 26-mile (42 km) section of the Old Mine Road in Sussex and Warren counties. In this stretch, it is known as County Route 521, Delaware Mine Road, Old Mine Road, River Road and various other local designations.

The stretch runs through Montague, Sandyston, Walpack and Hardwick townships. The southern end starts near the Pahaquarry Copper Mine, in what was once Pahaquarry Township, now part of Hardwick Township. The northern end is at the intersection of Old Mine Road, County Route 521, and U.S. Route 206 in Montague Township.

It includes Early Republic, Late Victorian, and Early Colonial Dutch architecture.

Van Campen's Inn, also known as the Isaac Van Campen Inn, was built c. 1750 either by Van Campen or Harmon Rosenkrans. It is a two and one-half story fieldstone building with Georgian and Dutch styling. It was documented by the Historic American Buildings Survey in 1937, 1941, 1967, and 1970.

There are two ferry houses in the Flatbrookville section of Walpack Township, the Decker Ferry House, built c. 1800, and the Rosenkrans Ferry House, also known as the Smith-Rosenkrans House, built c. 1807, that contribute to the district. Three houses in the Millbrook section of Hardwick Township, the Colonel Abraham Van Campen House, built c. 1750, the B. B. Van Campen Farm, also known as the Moses Van Campen House, built c. 1840, and the Miller House, also known as the James Van Campen Farm, contribute.

== Gallery ==
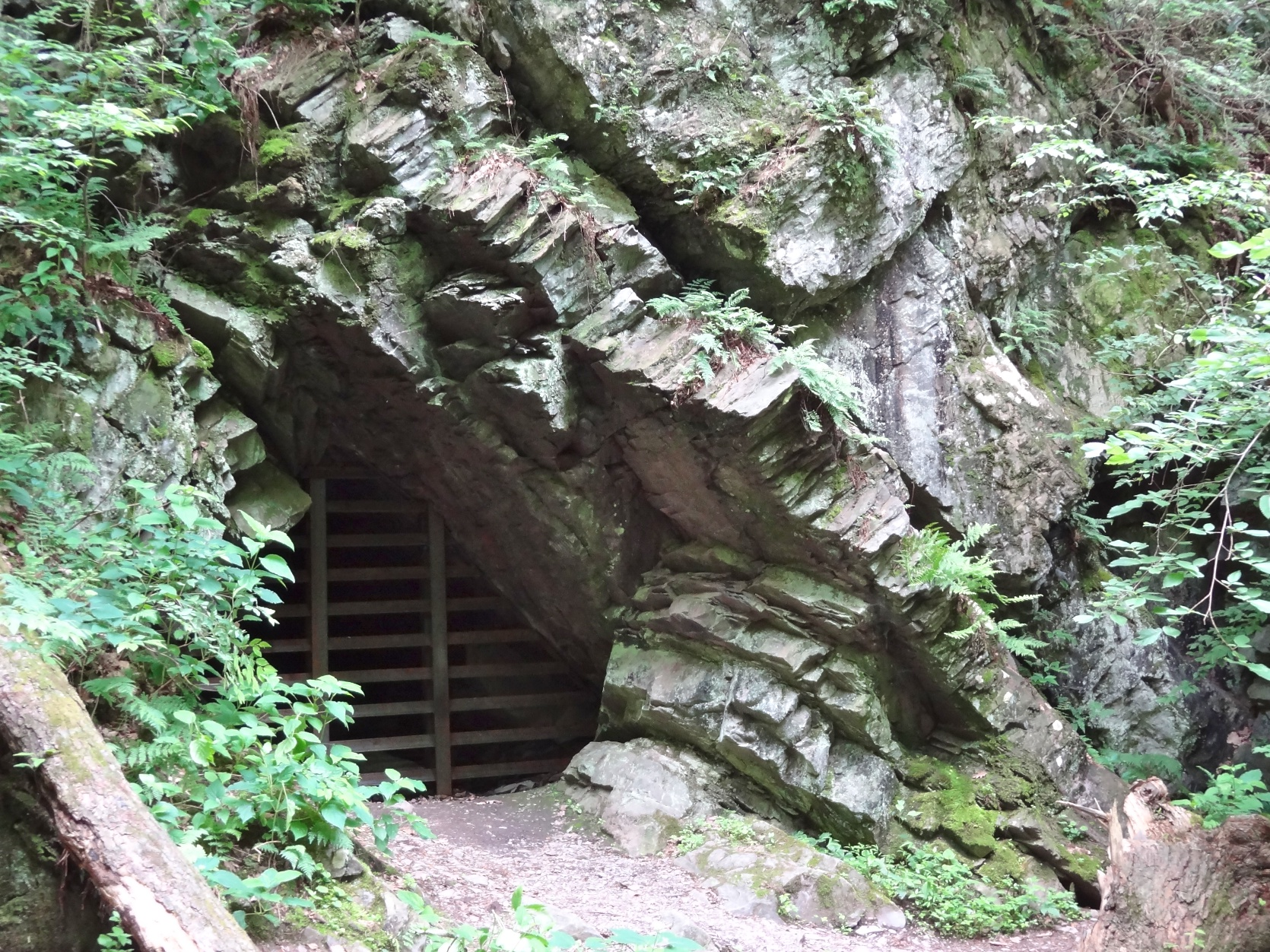
Pahaquarry Copper Mine

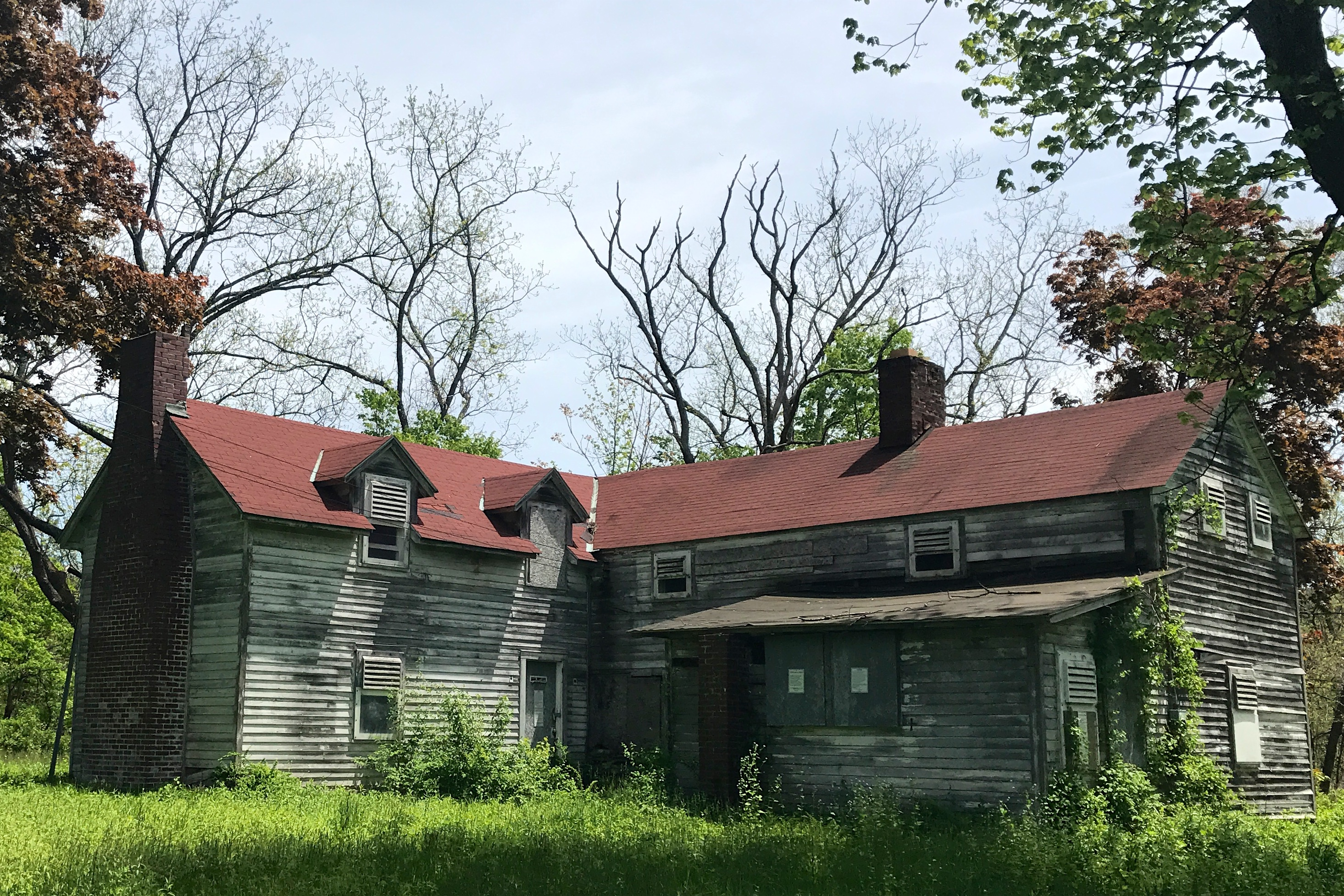
Decker Ferry House

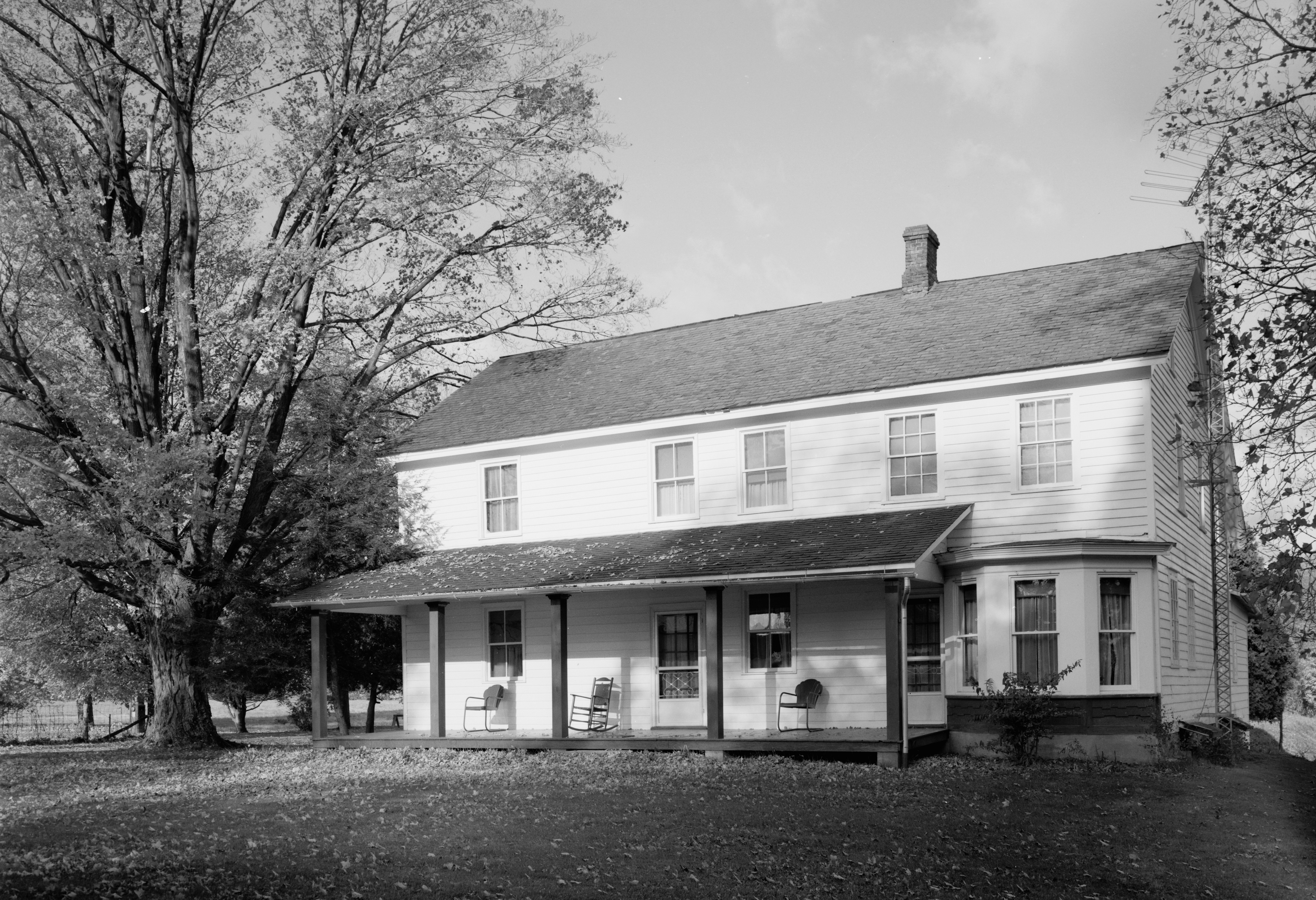
Rosenkrans Ferry House

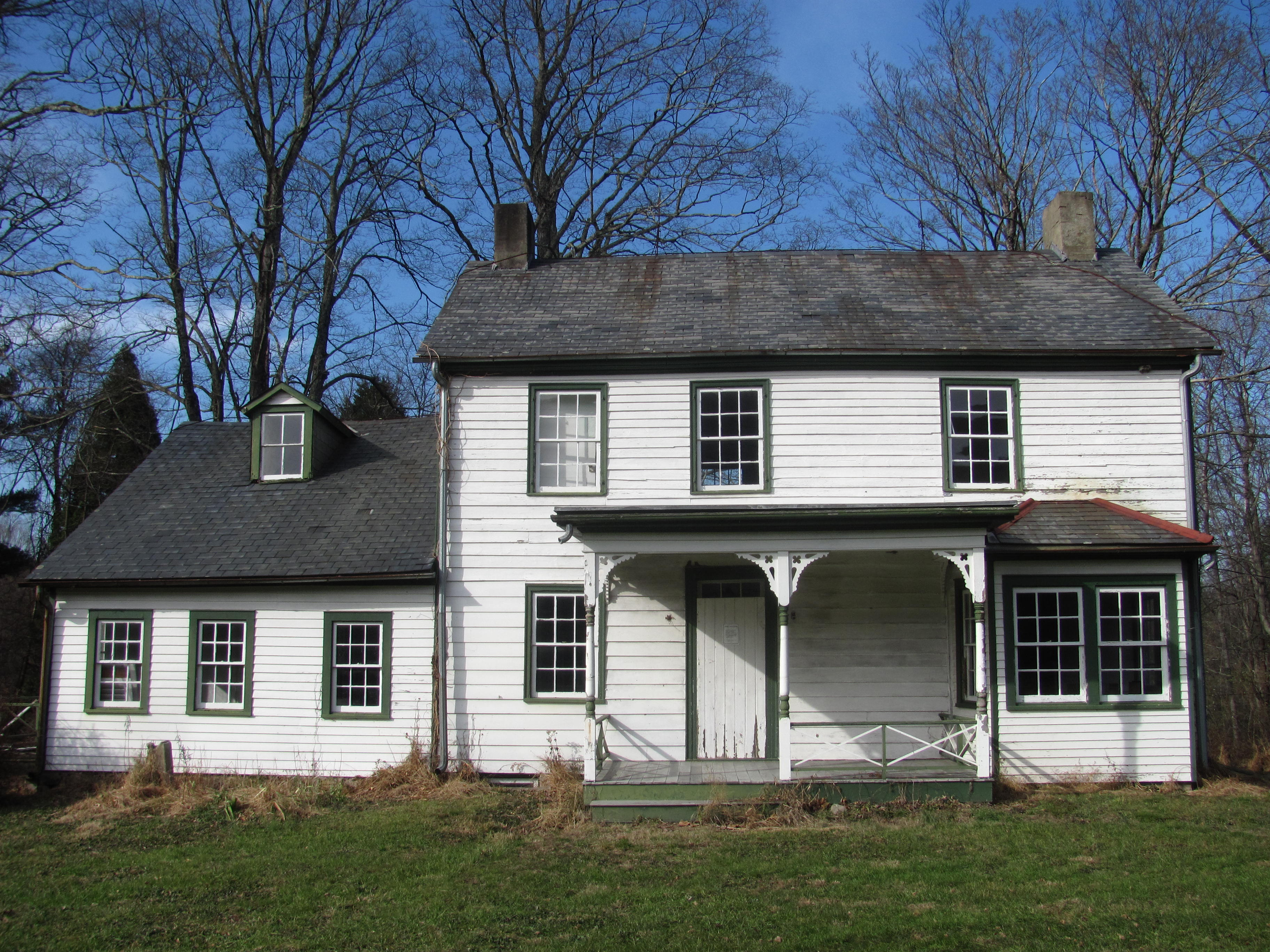
B. B. Van Campen Farm

== See also ==
- National Register of Historic Places listings in Sussex County, New Jersey
- National Register of Historic Places listings in Warren County, New Jersey
