= Pahaquarry Township, New Jersey =

Populated place in Warren County, New Jersey, US

- Location within Warren County, New Jersey
- Coordinates: 41.0500959°N 75.0329525°W
- Country: United States
- State: New Jersey
- County: Warren
- Incorporated: December 27, 1824
- Dissolved: July 2, 1997
- Elevation: 551 ft (168 m)
- Time zone: UTC-5
  - Summer (DST): UTC-4 (Eastern (EDT))

Pahaquarry Township (pah-QUAR-ree) was a township that was located in Warren County, New Jersey, United States, from 1824 until it was dissolved in 1997.

== History ==
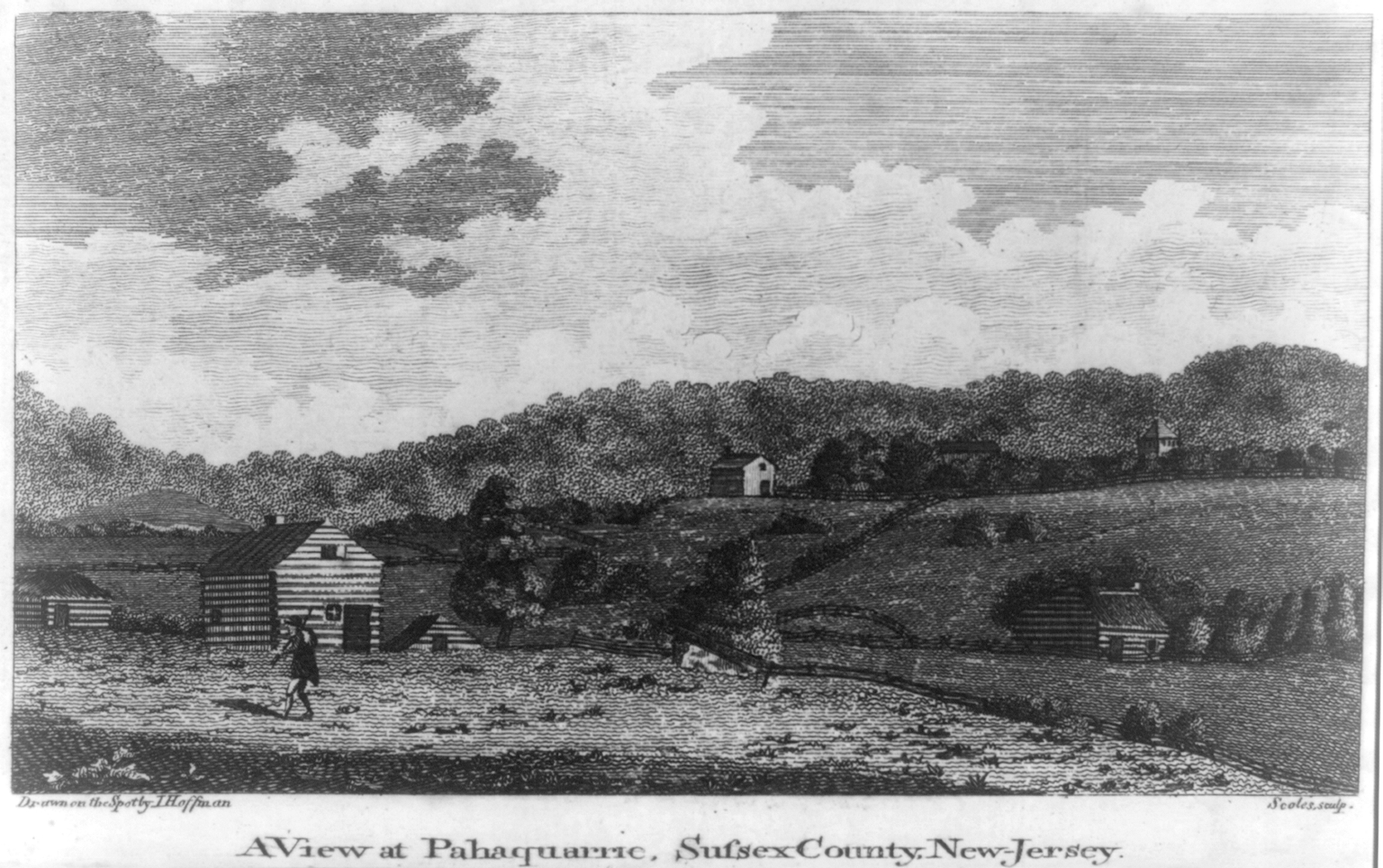
A view at Pahaquarric, Sussex County, New Jersey, engraved by John Scoles c. 1794

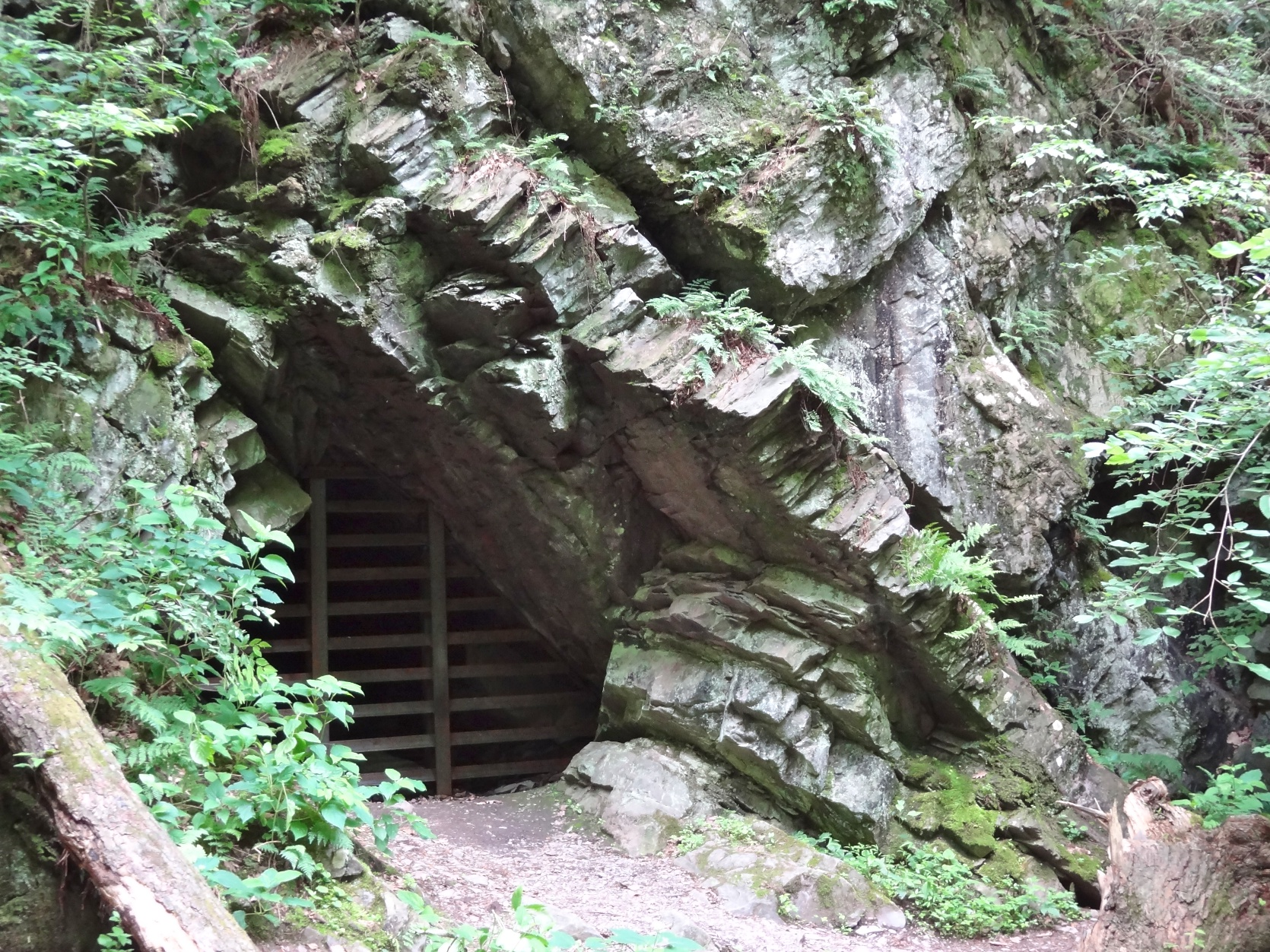
Adit No. 1 at Pahaquarry Copper Mine, established c. 1750

Pahaquarry Township was formed on December 27, 1824, from portions of Walpack Township in Sussex County and set off to Warren County.

The township got its name from the word Pahaquarra, which was a derivation of the Native American word Pahaqualong, which meant "the place between the mountains beside the waters".

Opened in the 1750s, the Pahaquarry Copper Mine was active from the 18th to early-20th centuries, until its closure in 1928. Despite developments in mining technology and improving mineral extraction methods, the mine remained unsuccessful and unprofitable, as the ore extracted proved to be of too low a concentration of copper.

Millbrook Village, located along the historic Old Mine Road in Pahaquarry, was home to the Van Campen family farmsteads built during the late-18th and 19th-centuries. In 1832, Abram Garis built a grist mill along Van Campen brook. The mill soon attracted other businesses and by the 1870s, Millbrook was a thriving farm village. However, by 1910, the mill, store and hotel closed their doors. The area is now part of the Delaware Water Gap National Recreation Area, and located within the Old Mine Road Historic District. Other buildings have been moved from other sites or are newly built to help depict village life in the valley during the late-19th and early-20th century. Several buildings are open to the public on summer weekends.

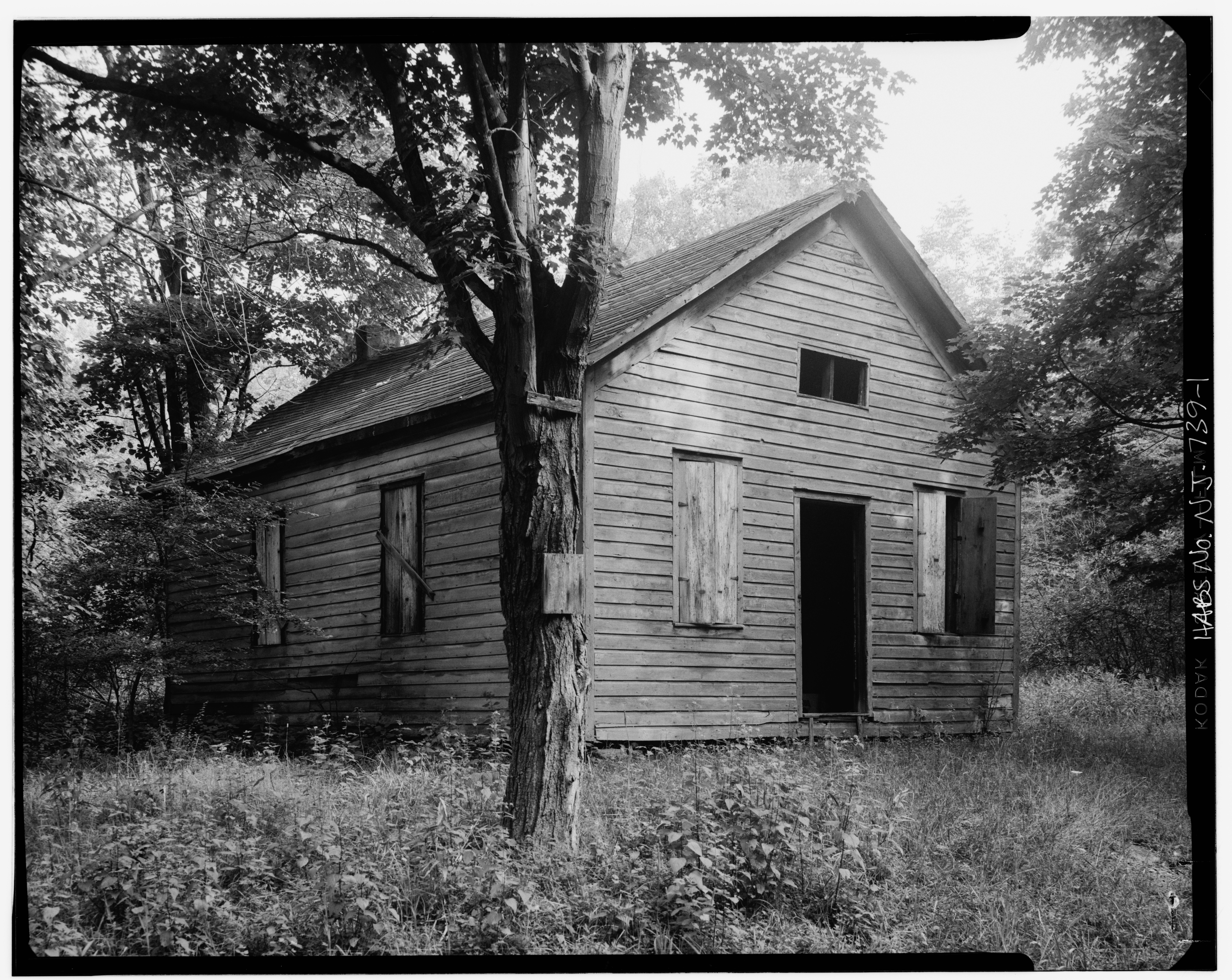
Millbrook School, as seen August 1970

The Calno School was established in 1870, rebuilt in 1910, and active until the 1940, for schoolchildren of Pahaquarry. By 1881, the Calno school district counted 48 school-age pupils. Only 30 were on the school's register, though, and daily attendance averaged only 15. Teachers, who were paid poorly, boarded with local families and seldom stayed more than a year or two. Most students traveled to school on foot, and schools were placed so that students would not have to walk more than four to five miles. The Millbrook School, located 5 miles north in Millbrook Village, was used to teach Pahaquarry children, as well.

Pahaquarry sits on the Delaware River. Most of its land was purchased by the federal government during the late 1960s in order to build the proposed Tocks Island Dam along the river, and its population was reduced to only a handful of people. Grassroot environmental organizations and mass local opposition put a halt to these plans and the dam was never completed. Most of the land became part of Delaware Water Gap National Recreation Area. The project was officially deauthorized by Congress during 1992.

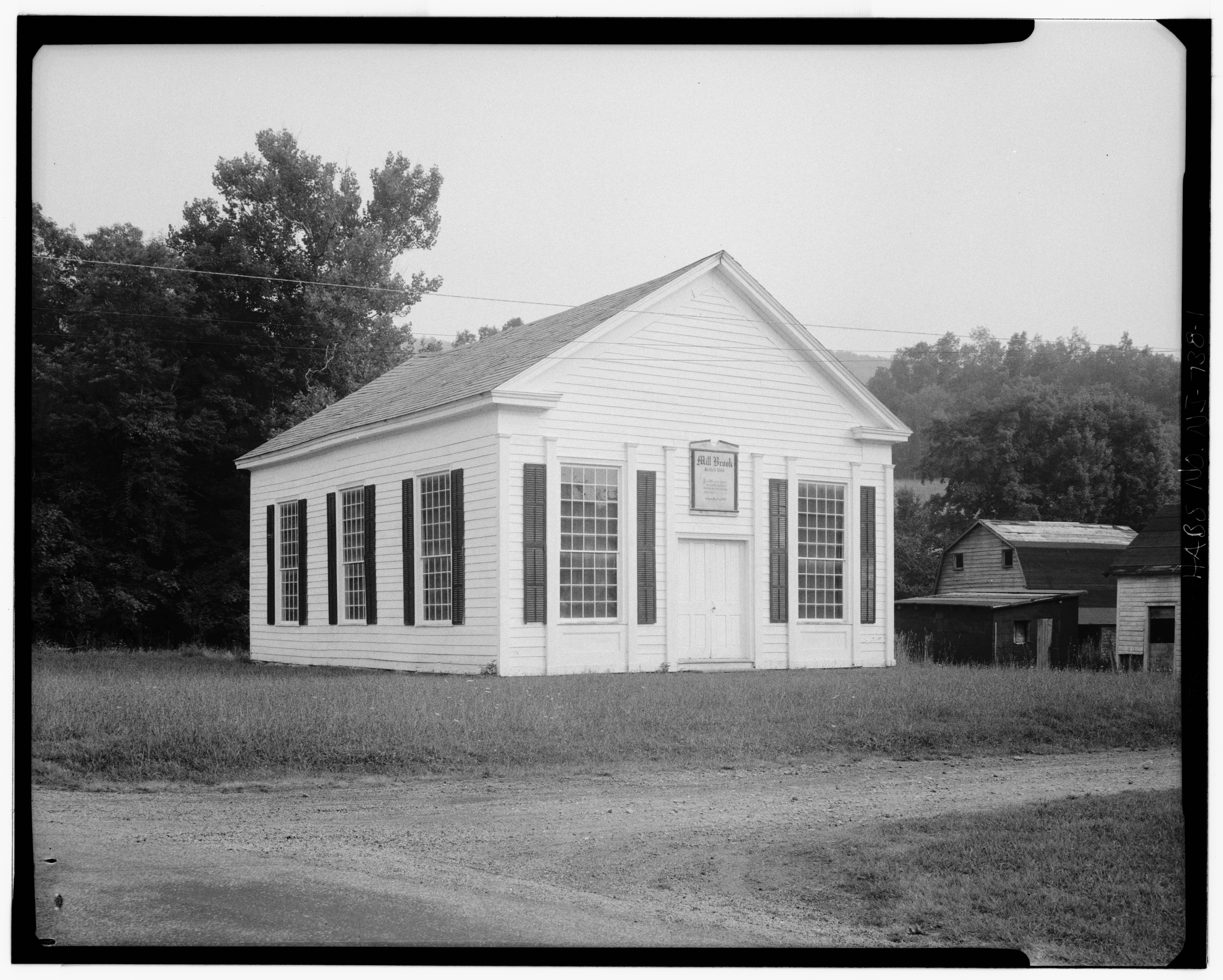
Millbrook Methodist Episcopal Church, as seen August 1970

Mayor Jean Zipser and Harold Van Campen, the only 2 township residents eligible to be members of the Township Committee, met inside the Calno School and voted 2-0 to permit the dissolution to proceed in March 1997; an April 1997 New York Times article covering the vote brought national attention to Pahaquarry and its population of six residents. On July 2, 1997, Pahaquarry Township was dissolved and incorporated into Hardwick Township.

== Demographics ==
Historical population
Census	Pop.	Note	%±
1830	258		—
1840	292		13.2%
1850	460		57.5%
1860	465		1.1%
1870	405		−12.9%
1880	418		3.2%
1890	291		−30.4%
1900	257		−11.7%
1910	205		−20.2%
1920	128		−37.6%
1930	80		−37.5%
1940	72		−10.0%
1950	67		−6.9%
1960	63		−6.0%
1970	71		12.7%
1980	26		−63.4%
1990	20		−23.1%
Population sources: 1830-1920 1840 1850; 1870 1880-1890; 1890-1910 1910-1930; 1930-1990

As of the 1990 United States census (the last census for which the Township existed), there were 20 people, 9 households, and 5 families residing in the township. The racial makeup of the borough was 100.00% White (20 Whites). 5.00% of the population was Hispanic or Latino of any race (1 Hispanic or Latino).

In the township, the population was spread out, with 15.0% under the age of 18, 10.0% from 18 to 24, 20.0% from 25 to 44, 30.0% from 45 to 64, and 25.0% who were 65 years of age or older. The median age was 38 years.

== Popular culture ==
- Pittsburgh indie rock band Vehicle Flips released a song titled "Song for Pahaquarry, NJ (1824–1997)" on their 2000 album For You I Pine, reflecting on the fate of the town.

== See also ==
- Minisink
- Pahaquarry Copper Mine
- Millbrook Village
- Old Mine Road Historic District
- Tocks Island Dam Controversy
- Yards Creek Generating Station
