= Millbrook, New Jersey =

Populated place in Warren County, New Jersey, US

- Unincorporated community
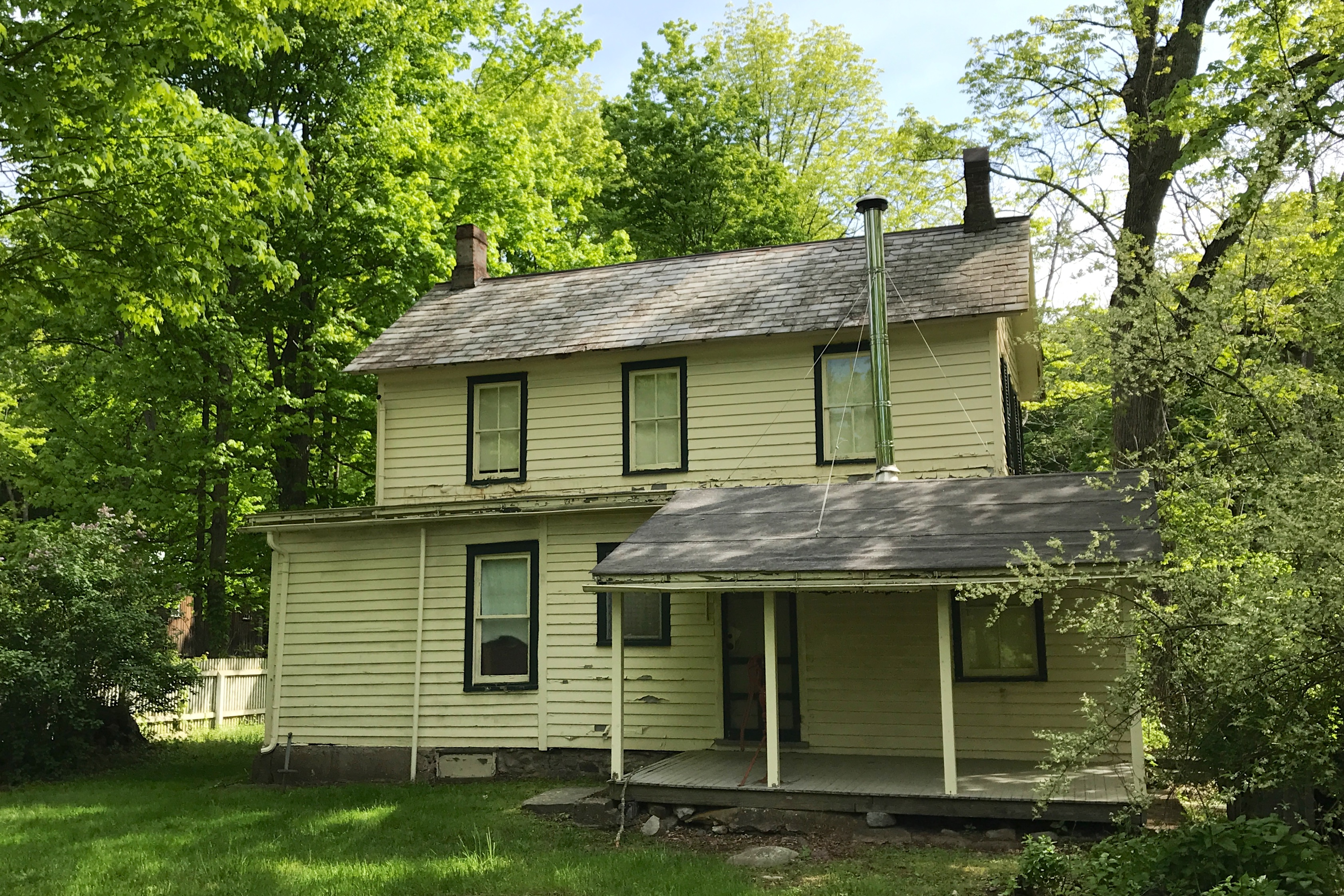
- George Trauger House

- Location of Millbrook within Warren County. Inset: Location of Warren County in New Jersey. Millbrook (New Jersey) Millbrook (the United States)
- Coordinates: 41°04′24″N 74°57′47″W
- Country: United States
- State: New Jersey
- County: Warren
- Township: Hardwick
- Named for: Van Campens Mill Brook
- Elevation: 660 ft (200 m)
- Time zone: UTC−05:00 (Eastern (EST))
  - Summer (DST): UTC−04:00 (EDT)
- GNIS feature ID: 878370

Millbrook, also known as Millbrook Village, is an unincorporated community located along Old Mine Road within Hardwick Township, formerly Pahaquarry Township, in Warren County, in the U.S. state of New Jersey. It is named after the Mill Brook, now known as Van Campens Mill Brook, a tributary of the Delaware River. The area is now part of the Delaware Water Gap National Recreation Area.

== History ==
A grist mill was built here in 1832, by Abram Garis, on what is now known as Van Campens Mill Brook. The George Trauger House was built c. 1860. The Colonel Abraham Van Campen House, built c. 1750, the B. B. Van Campen Farm, also known as the Moses Van Campen House, built c. 1840, and the Miller House, also known as the James Van Campen Farm, are contributing properties of the Old Mine Road Historic District. The Abraham Van Campen House, built c. 1790, was moved to the village in 1974.

== Gallery ==
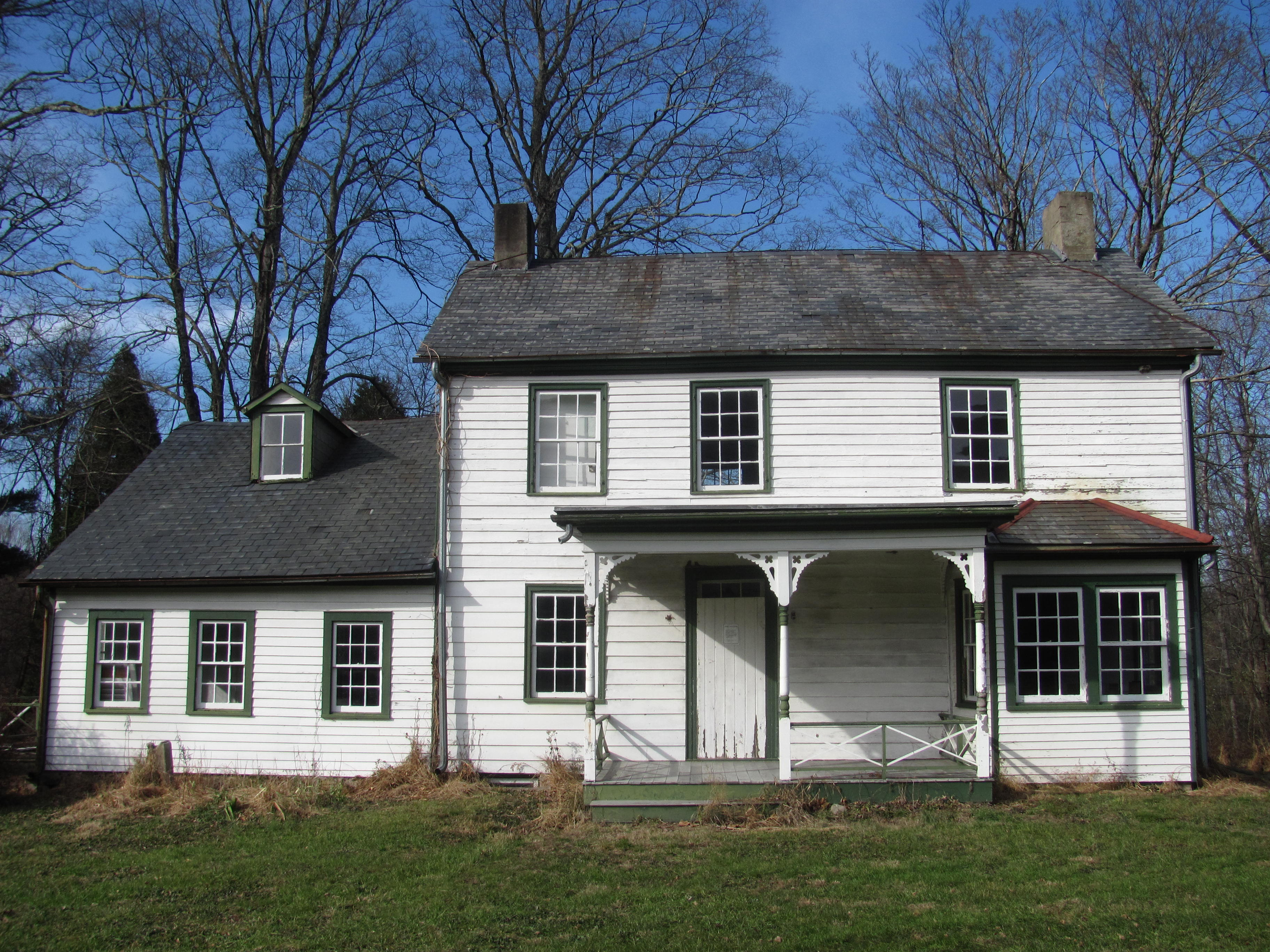
B. B. Van Campen Farm

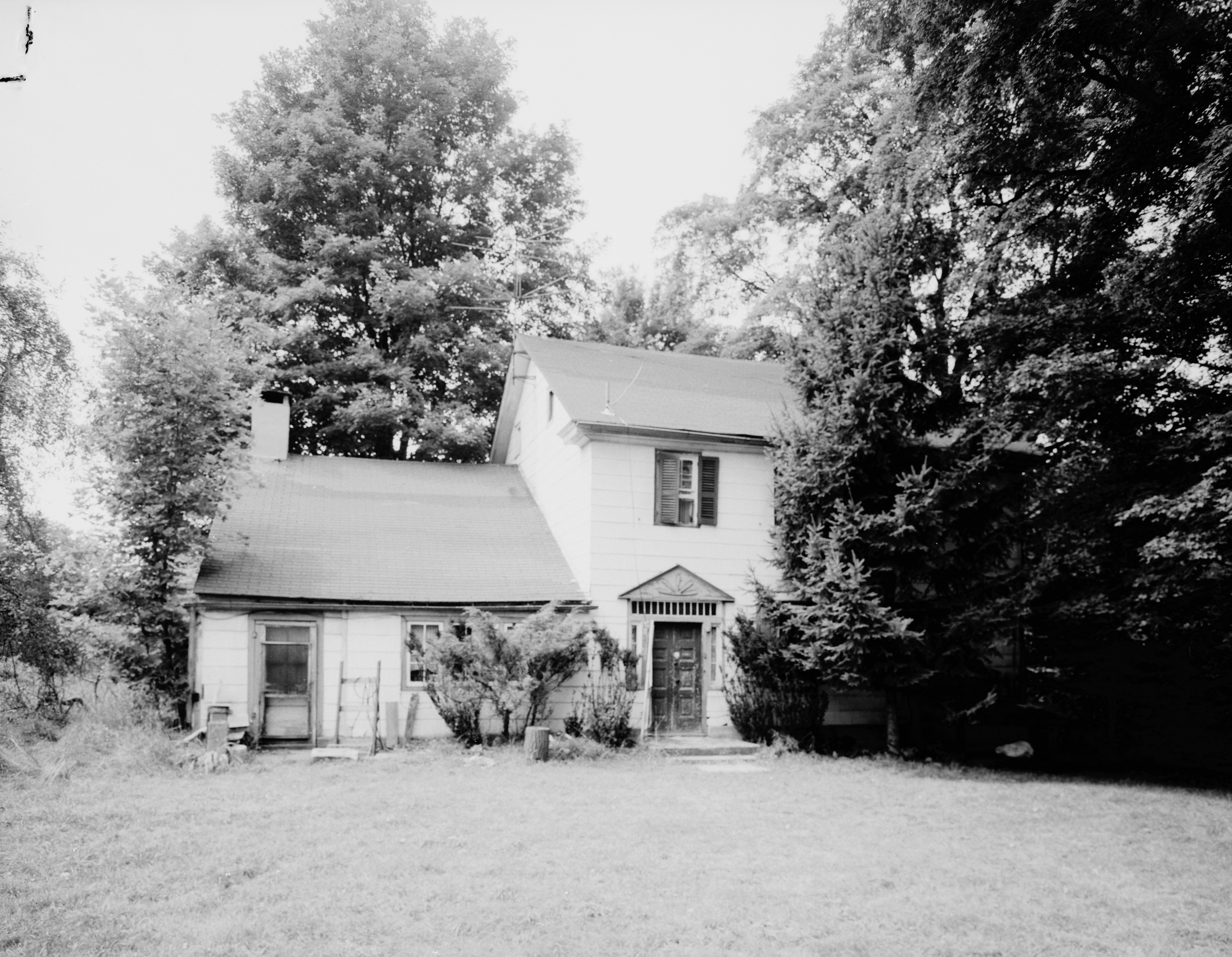
Abraham Van Campen House
