= Pahaquarry Copper Mine =

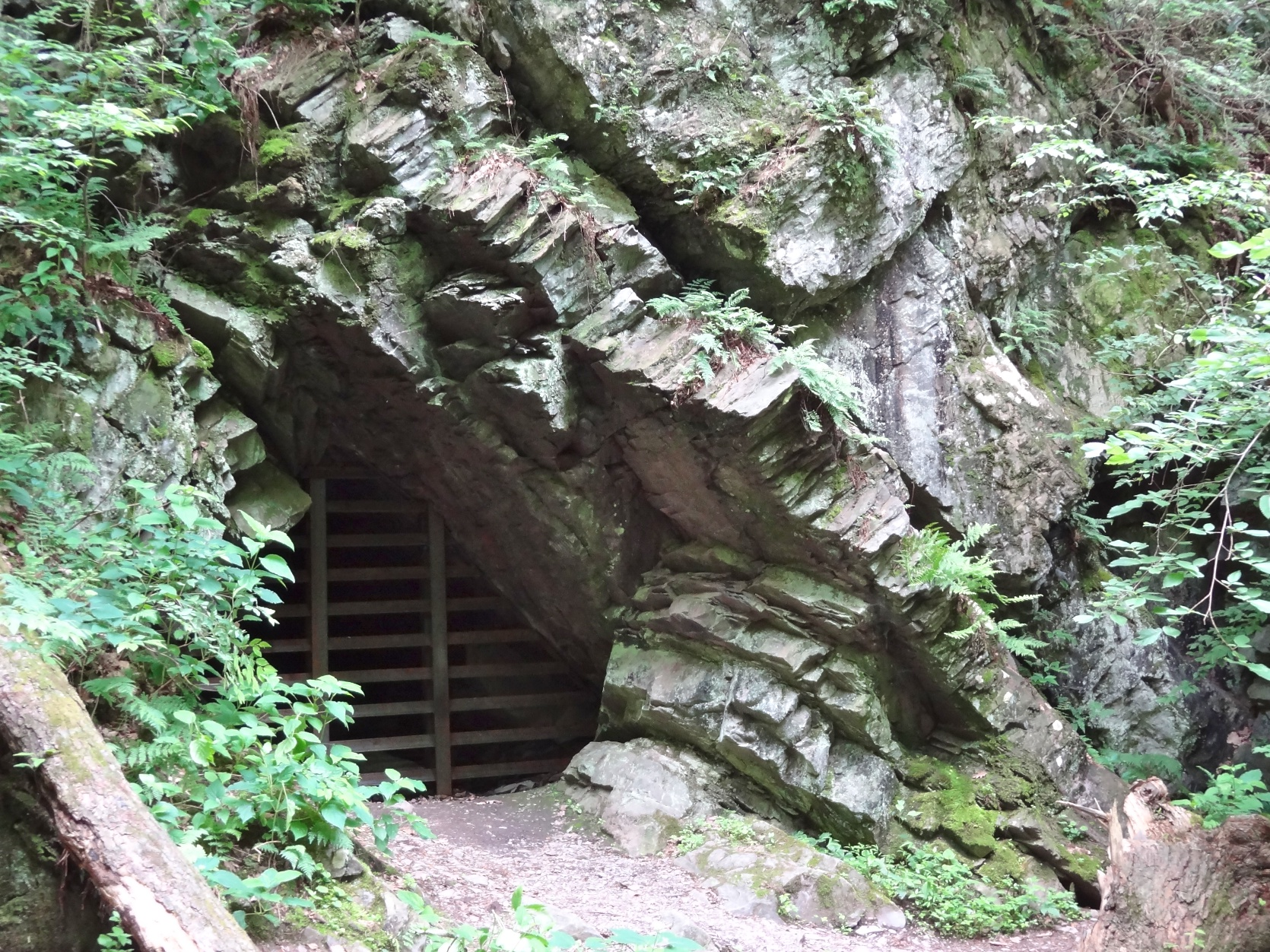
- Adit Number 1

- Location within Warren County, New Jersey
- Location: Delaware Water Gap National Recreation Area, New Jersey, United States; 41°02′17″N 75°01′39″W
- Products: Copper ore
- Opened: 1750s
- Active: 1750s, 1847–48, 1861–62, 1901–11
- Closed: 1928
- Company: National Park Service (current)
- Website: http://www.nps.gov/dewa
- Pahaquarry Copper Mine Ruins
- U.S. Historic district – Contributing property
- Part of: Old Mine Road Historic District (ID80000410)
- Designated CP: December 3, 1980

The Pahaquarry Copper Mine is an abandoned copper mine located on the west side of Kittatinny Mountain presently in Hardwick Township in Warren County, New Jersey in the United States. Active mining was attempted for brief periods during the mid-eighteenth, mid-nineteenth, and early twentieth centuries but was never successful despite developments in mining technology and improving mineral extraction methods. Such ventures were not profitable as the ore extracted proved to be of too low a concentration of copper. This site incorporates the mining ruins, hiking trails, and nearby waterfalls, and is located within the Delaware Water Gap National Recreation Area and administered by the National Park Service. It was added to the National Register of Historic Places in 1980 as a contributing property to the Old Mine Road Historic District.

Local tradition and several early historians recount legends of seventeenth-century Dutch miners searching for copper in the Minisink region and commencing mining operations at this location before 1650. In order to bring this ore to market, the miners are alleged to have built a 104 miles (167 km) road, the Old Mine Road linking these mines near the Delaware Water Gap with Kingston, New York. This tradition has been refuted by recent research, and it is thought the road has no connection with the mines but was built as Dutch families from New York settled the Minisink in the Eighteenth Century. The earliest evidence of mining at Pahaquarry is 1740 with a brief venture funded by John Reading, Jr. Later attempts in the middle of the nineteenth century and a renewed effort during the early years of the twentieth century were brief and likewise unsuccessful.

== History ==
=== Legends about Dutch miners ===
There are several legends associated with this mine that have been discredited by historians and archaeologists, notably Herbert C. Kraft. One legend claims that the Lenape worked the mine even before European settlers arrived. However, archeological and scientific testing show that the copper artifacts from the area originated from major native copper mines in Isle Royale and the Keweenaw Peninsula Michigan.

Another legend claims that early Dutch settlers of New Netherland in the 1650s discovered and worked the mine in Lenape territory. This then leads to the legend that the Dutch built the Old Mine Road stretching 104 miles (167 km) to Esopus, New York to transport the ore. While the nearby roadside historical marker repeats these claims, no hard evidence has been found to support either one. Many references to this mining area continue to repeat these old legends as fact.

=== Mining ventures 1750-1910 ===
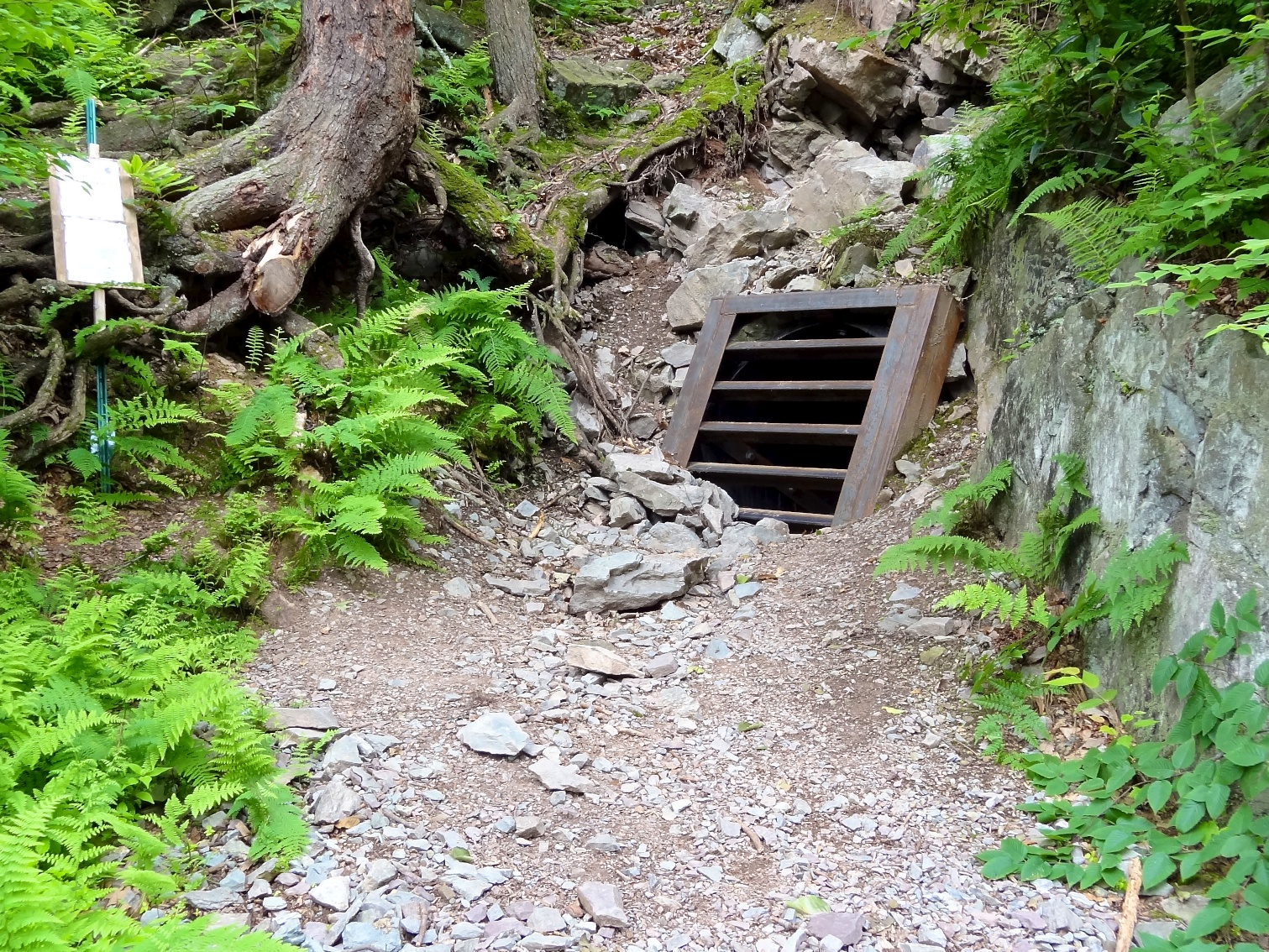
Adit Number 2

The Pahaquarry mine site was operated for three brief periods of mining activity. The earliest documented reports are from the 1750s, when John Reading, Jr. and his partners purchased land along the Mine Brook in early Walpack Township along the Delaware River in northwestern New Jersey. Reading, a prominent surveyor and land investor and member of the Provincial Council, served as the New Jersey colony's acting governor in 1747, and from 1757–1758. By 1760, the venture was a failure and mining activity ceased.

The next attempt began with the formation of the Alleghany Mining Company in 1847 by a group of men from Flemington, New Jersey. New mining activity began, but quickly ended in 1848, due to the poor quality of the ore. New management of the company restarted operations in 1861, but again mining quickly stopped the next year.

In 1867, Aaron Keyser bought the property for bark and timber. This soon ended when the land was transferred back to the Alleghany Mining Company in the 1890s.

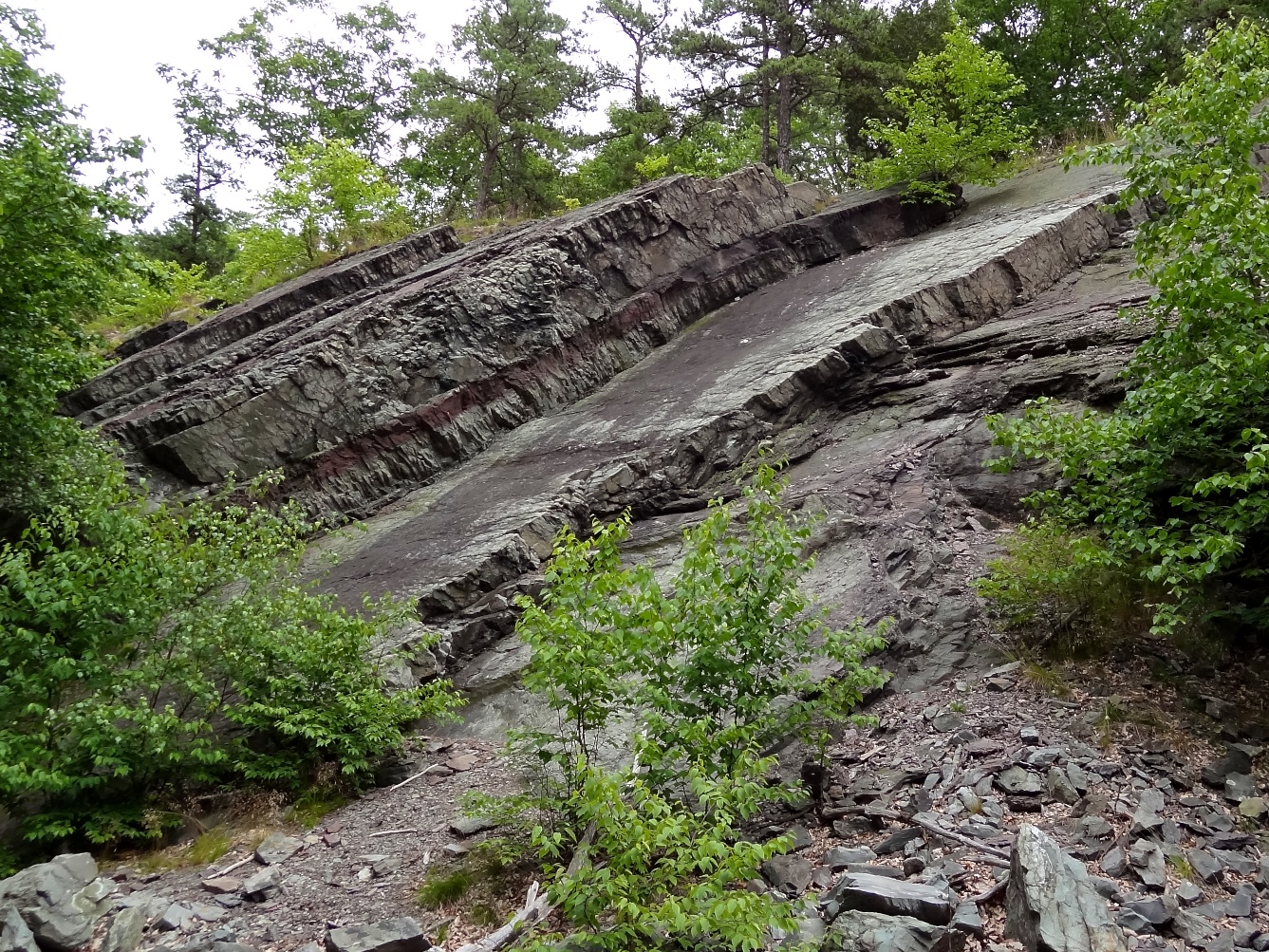
Open quarry, excavation started 1907.

The last mining attempt began in 1901 when the Montgomery Gold Leaf Mining Company, founded by the brothers, Henry and Oliver Deshler of Belvidere, New Jersey, purchased the assets of the Alleghany Mining Company. After unsuccessful operations, the company reorganized as the Pahaquarry Copper Company in 1904. During the next years, a large ore processing mill, adjoining buildings and infrastructure were constructed at the area. The mill underwent many changes as the technology developed by Nathaniel S. Keith was new and untested. New ore was not dug until 1911, and stopped after three months, producing perhaps only three ingots of refined copper. The last of the mining equipment was removed in 1928, ending copper mining in the area.

From 1925 to 1972, the area was a camp for the George Washington Council (now merged and part of Central New Jersey Council) of the Boy Scouts of America. The land was then purchased by the United States Army Corps of Engineers in preparation for the building of the controversial Tocks Island Dam project.

== Geology ==
The copper ore deposit found here is the grayish mineral chalcocite (copper sulfide) embedded in a hard gray sandstone band of the Bloomsburg Red Beds. The similar color and low ore yield make visual identification difficult. Secondary minerals that can be seen include green malachite and blue-green chrysocolla. Between 1903 and 1906, Dr. Keith reported an average yield of 3.25% copper using 100 samples. In 1943, the United States Geological Survey reported yields of 0.11% to 0.38% copper and recommended that no more work be done at Pahaquarry.

== See also ==
- Delaware Water Gap National Recreation Area
- Old Mine Road
- Tocks Island Dam Controversy
- Sussex County, New Jersey
- Warren County, New Jersey

== Bibliography ==
- Burns Chavez, Steve R.; Clemensen, A. Berle (August 1995). "Pahaquarry Copper Mine, Final Cultural Landscape Report, Vol. 1" (PDF). U. S. Department of the Interior, National Park Service. Archived from the original (PDF) on March 1, 2010.
- Cornwall, H. R. (June 1943). Pahaquarry Copper Mine. United States Department of the Interior, Geological Survey.
- Kraft, Herbert C. (1996). The Dutch, the Indians and the Quest for Copper: Pahaquarry and the Old Mine Road. West Orange, New Jersey: Seton Hall University Museum. ISBN 978-0-935137-02-6.
- Müller, F. L. (Summer 2009). "Old Dutch Mine" (PDF). Unearthing New Jersey Vol. 5, No. 2. New Jersey Geological Survey.
