= Military Road (New Jersey) =

Revolutionary American roadway

The Military Road (also known as the Military Supply Road) was a roadway built in the present-day U.S. state of New Jersey during the French and Indian War connecting Elizabethtown (now Elizabeth) with a string of fortifications along the Delaware River in modern Sussex and Warren Counties in northwestern New Jersey. The road was conceived and built under the order of Jonathan Hampton, Esq., an Elizabethtown merchant and surveyor who was appointed as Victualer and Paymaster to the New Jersey Frontier Guard by an act of the New Jersey's colonial legislature.

Most of the route has been converted into roads within the federal, state and county highways system, and into a few local, municipal roads. A one-mile (1.6 km) segment of the original road, traveling from the village of Walpack Center in Walpack Township, New Jersey to the terminus of the route at the Delaware River within the bounds of the Delaware Water Gap National Recreation Area is maintained by the National Park Service in its original condition. Several shorter segments are unmaintained, and often parallel the modern roadways which evolved from the route.

== History ==
Hampton followed the Minisink Trail for a large segment of the Military Road.

== Modern routes ==
- U.S. Route 206
- New Jersey State Route 10
- County Route 521 (New Jersey)
- County Route 519 (New Jersey)
- County Route 626 (New Jersey)

== See also ==
- Delaware Water Gap National Recreation Area
- Old Mine Road
- Stokes State Forest
