= New Jersey Frontier Guard =

1700s provincial military unit

The Frontier Guard was a provincial military unit organized by New Jersey's colonial legislature in 1755 to man a series of frontier fortifications along the Delaware River in northwestern New Jersey. Members were paid two shillings per day, provincial currency, and were supposed to provide their own firelock, blanket, hatchet or cutlass, cartridge box, knapsack or haversack, and powder horn. As the Province had spent its available funds in equipping the Jersey Blues, the Frontier Guard was not a uniformed unit.

== History ==
At the time of the French and Indian War (1756–1763), the population of New Jersey largely was centered around Atlantic seaports in Elizabethtown (present-day Elizabeth, New Jersey), Newark and Perth Amboy and the colonial legislature authorized the construction of blockhouse forts in the area of present-day Sussex and Warren Counties, New Jersey to serve as a first line of defense in the event of an incursion by the French army and the forces of French-allied native tribes. The New Jersey Frontier Guard was organized to man those forts as the state militia fought elsewhere within the colonies of Virginia, Pennsylvania and New York. Supplies were provided to the Frontier Guard from Elizabethtown, transported by way of the Military Road.

The area where these blockhouse forts were constructed was composed of sparsely populated frontier settlements that during the years before the American Revolutionary War were subjected to frequent raids and attacks by Native American warriors.

== See also ==
- French and Indian War
- History of New Jersey
- Jersey Blues
- Military Road (New Jersey)
- Old Mine Road
