= Old Mine Road =

Old road in Northeast America

Route information
- Length: 104 mi (167 km)
- Component highways: US 209 for much of length

Major junctions
- South end: Columbia, NJ
- North end: Kingston, NY

Location
- Country: United States
- States: New Jersey, New York

Highway system

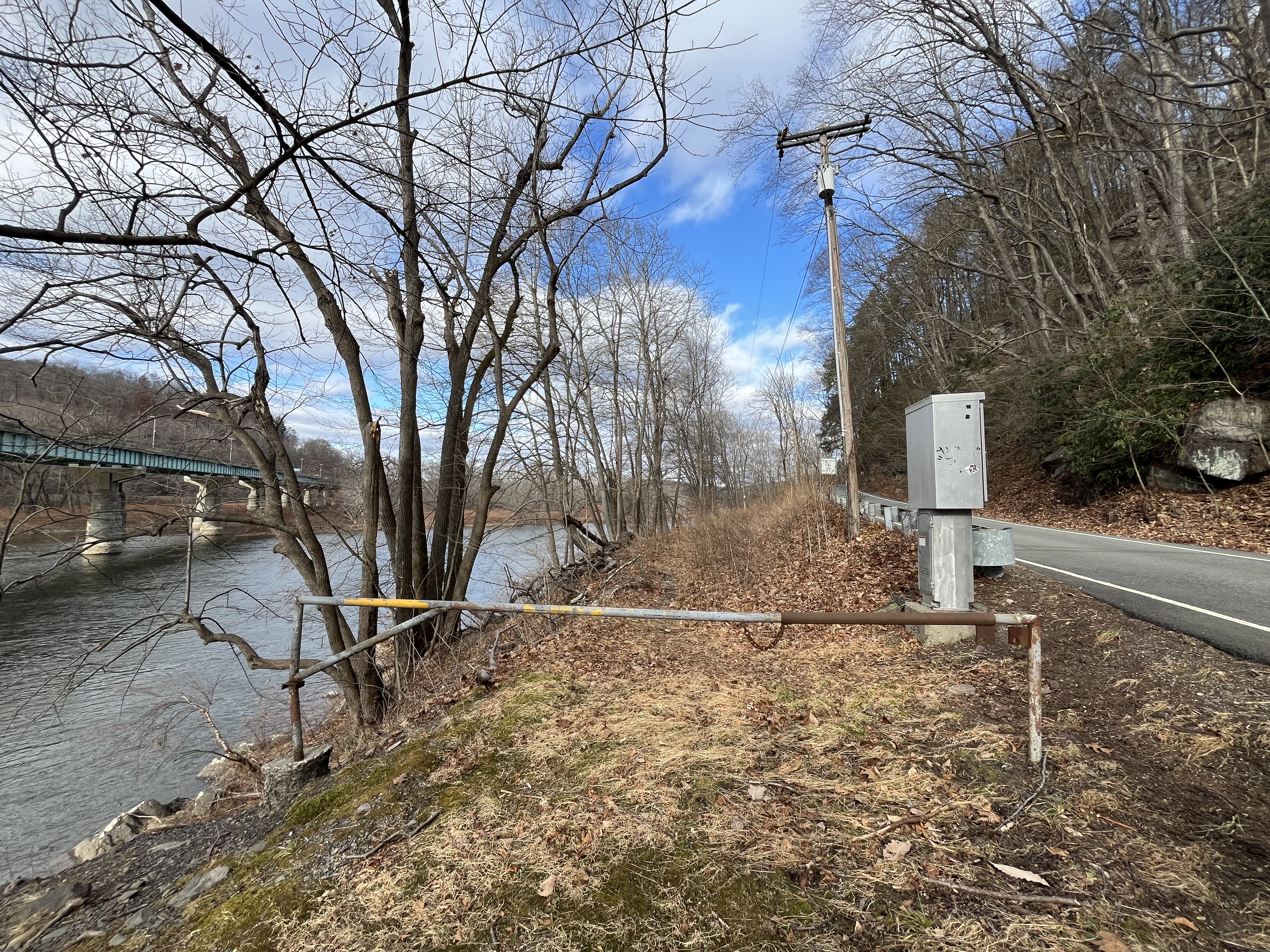
The southern end of Old Mine Road at right. Route 80 bridge can be seen at left, with the Karamac trail straight ahead.

Old Mine Road is a road in New Jersey and New York said to be one of the oldest continuously used roads in the United States of America. At a length of 104 miles (167 km), it stretches from the Delaware Water Gap National Recreation Area to the vicinity of Kingston, New York.

Among the theories regarding the early history of the road, it is traditionally believed that Dutch miners began construction of the road in the 17th century in order to transport copper ore from the Pahaquarry Copper Mine along the Delaware River in Pahaquarry Township, New Jersey to Esopus, New York along the Hudson River in the Dutch colony of New Amsterdam. Many historians now discount much of this folklore. Starting in the late 17th century, Dutch settlement began along the course of the road, in the Kingston, New York, area. The road follows roughly the course of the later Delaware and Hudson Canal for its northern half, and the Delaware River in its southern half through the western edge of Sussex County and northern Warren County in northwestern New Jersey.

The road exists today, and although much of its length in New York has been modernized, widened and incorporated into US 209, its length in New Jersey as the "Old Mine Road" is largely undeveloped as it travels through the Delaware Water Gap National Recreation Area. The road still retains much of its historical and rural charm. Historic sites in both states assert the area's Dutch colonial heritage through the preservation of several homes, farms and churches.

== History ==
=== Paleo Indians and Native Americans ===
After the Wisconsin Glacier began retreating around 13,000 BC, the area slowly warmed. The area was first tundra with grasses growing. Later, as warming occurred, a taiga/boreal forest came into existence. Big game moved into the area.

Paleo-Indians were the first inhabitants of the area. Several sites along the Delaware River have been found north of the Gap and south of Port Jervis. Carbon dating of the oldest site is at 8900 BC just north of the Gap on the Pennsylvania side near a stream that flows into the river. There may be Paleo-Indian camps older than this which have yet to be found, as the surface level at that time was many feet below the present surface. Also, Paleo-Indians traveled in small groups and did not stay in any one place long, due to the fact that they were hunter-gatherers. They had to keep moving in search of game and plant foods. Therefore, Paleo-Indians could have been in the region as early as 10,500 BC.

The Lenape Native Americans settled the area several thousand years ago. They too were hunter-gatherers. They moved in search of food, but their moving of camps was more seasonal. One large village was at Minisink Island. They had trails and family villages along the Delaware River. A trail went through Culvers Gap that led through Augusta and then south, east of Newton, then to Parsippany.

=== Origin of road ===
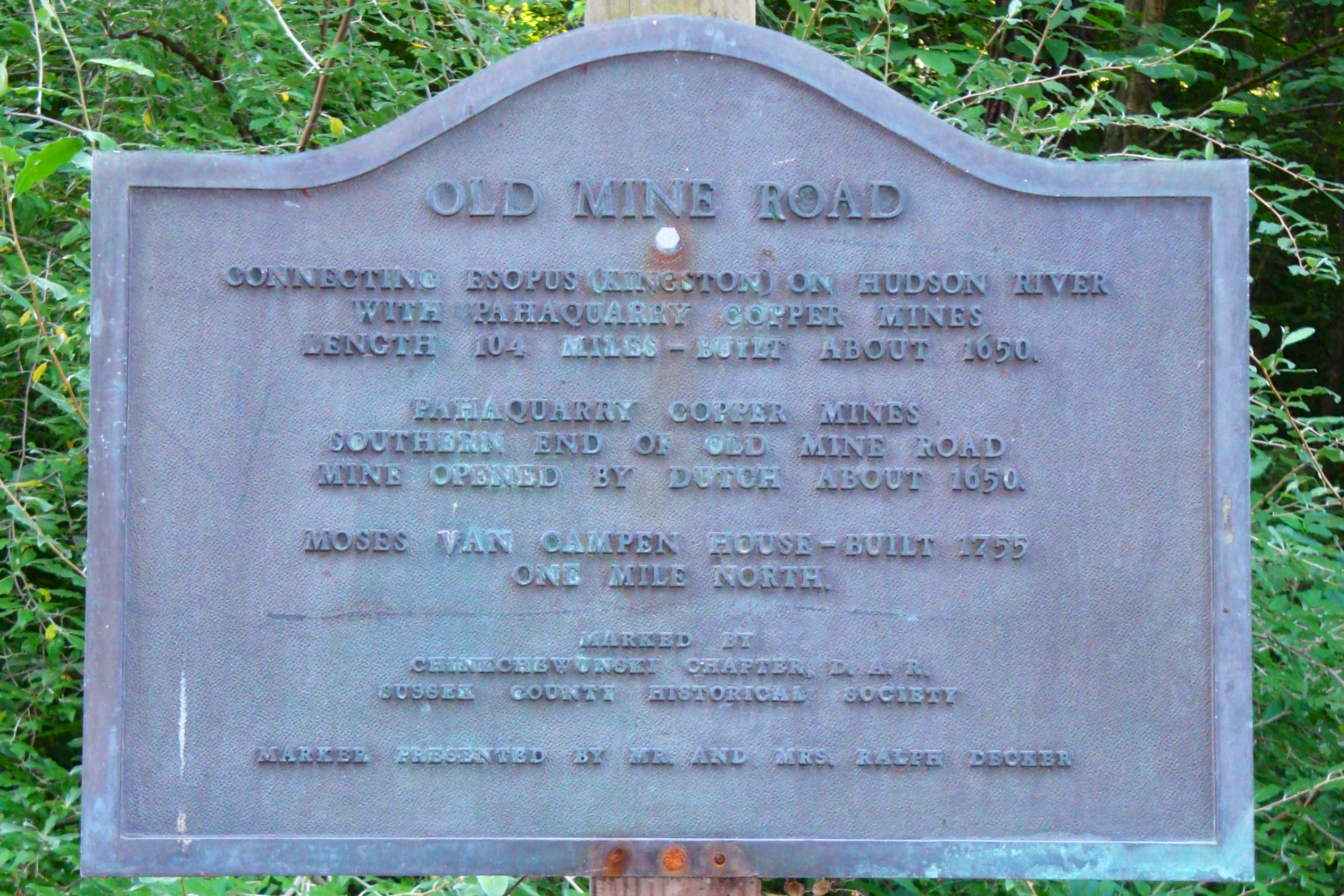
Old Mine Road information sign near the Pahaquarry Copper Mine

The road was probably started as a Paleo-Indian trail thousands of years ago, around 10,000 BC. Later, the trail was used by the Lenape. The trail was used to migrate, and travel to hunting and fishing areas.

In the late 17th century, a center near the Delaware Water Gap became connected to the Hudson River from Kingston, New York by the Old Mine Road. This road however would not be developed as a road until the early 18th century.

There were three wars during the middle of the 17th century: Governor Kieft's War, the Esopus Wars and the Peach War. With such hostilities between the Dutch and Native Americans, such a road could not have been built.

Dutch populations were not very high in the 17th century. They had forts along the Hudson River from Manhattan Island to slightly north of Albany. They did not have the manpower to build a road through a wilderness. The trees at the time were extremely large and the terrain was rugged. It would have required many men using axes to cut trees and brush to clear a path for such a road. Other men would have had to hunt game in Native American territory when there were hostilities. The Native Americans would not have allowed men to cut trees in their territory.

No archaeological diggings were ever found of Dutch camps along the "Old Mine" road that would have built such a road. Also, no camps were ever found at the Pahaquarry Mine area.

According to many maps drawn in the 18th century, including William Faden's map of 1778, no road is shown going south of Walpack Bend along the eastern side of the Delaware River to Pahaquarry. In 1830 a road was made through the Delaware Water Gap along the New Jersey side and then the road went on the eastern side of the Delaware to Pahaquarry. There was a road on Faden's map that went from Port Jervis to Minisink Island where the road then split three ways. One road went through Culvers Gap. The second crossed the Delaware at Minisink Island and went south along the western side of the river. The third road went to Walpack Bend where it crossed the river and went south along the western side of the Delaware. These were Native American trails that the Europeans used when Europeans arrived in the area.

The local ore contained only two to three percent copper, and hauling so much ore of very low quality on rugged roads using wooden carts would have been very difficult and not economically feasible.

If the Dutch had made the mine at Pahaquarry, the mining operation would have been extremely difficult and backbreaking. The area is in the Silurian High Falls Formation, a sandstone rock which is extremely hard. Given the technology of the 17th century, in which iron hammers and chisels would have been used, mining the low-quality ore in extremely hard rock would have been a very difficult undertaking. In reality, the Dutch had all the copper they needed, as they bought it from Sweden.

Given all the above facts, it is unlikely that the Dutch built Old Mine Road or mined the low-grade copper ore at Pahaquarry.

=== Early settlement ===
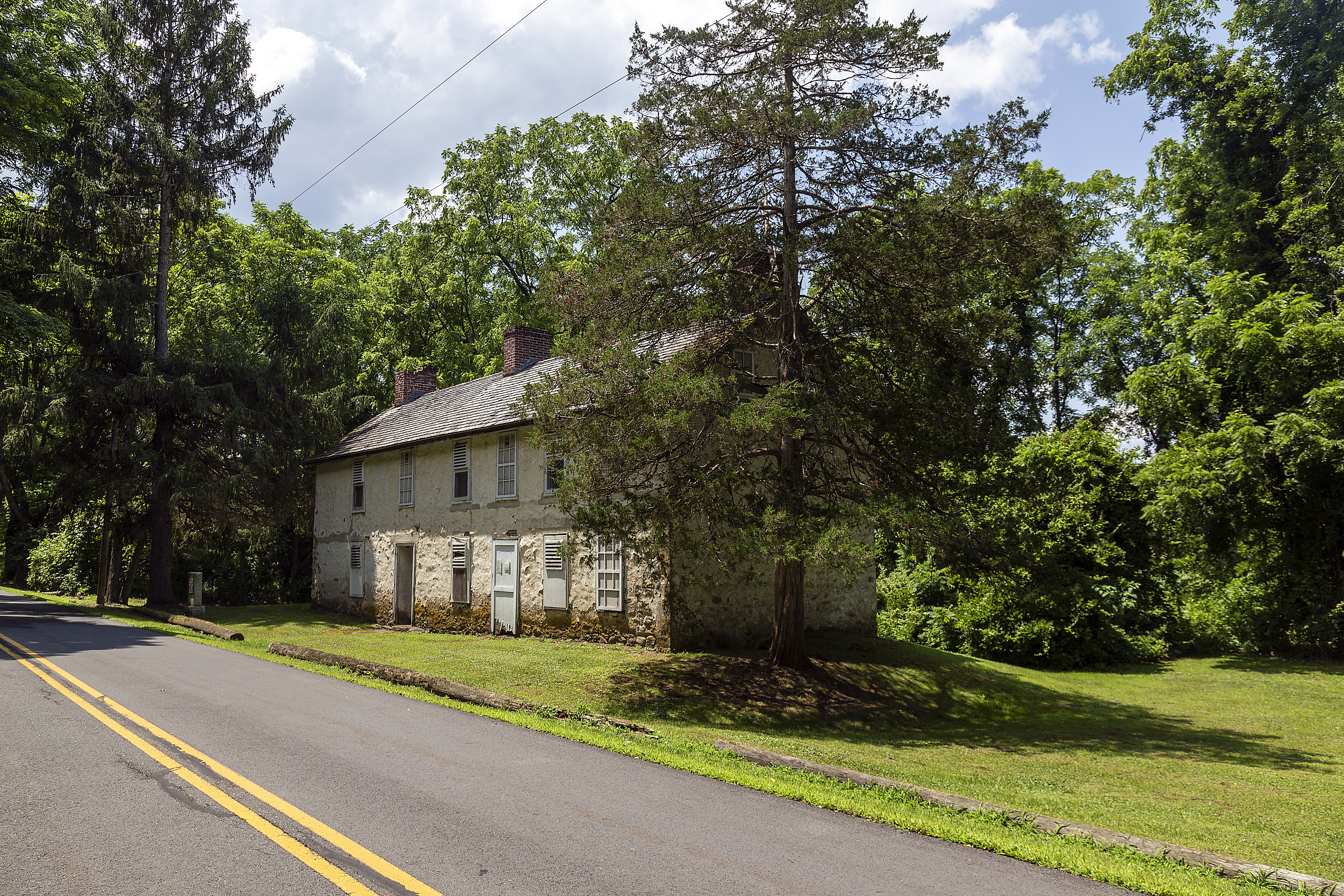
Abandoned house on the Old Mine Road near Minisink Island

The first early settlement was near Port Jervis, New York which was then New Jersey. A blacksmith bought land from the Lenape in 1698 near Port Jervis. They valued his metal making skills as no Native American was working with metal then. After that the English bought land from the Native Americans such as the Minisink Patent, Wawayanda Patent, NY-NJ Border War, Minisink settlement, Esopus, etc.

=== Frontier fortifications ===
During the French and Indian Wars in the mid-18th century, eight fortified houses were built along the Delaware River from Phillipsburg to Port Jervis. The first fort was near Belvidere and they were about eight miles apart. The next house was Isaac Van Campen's house near Walpack. The trail led through the Kittatinny Mountain northwest of Blairstown, and followed along the eastern side of the Delaware River. At no time did the trail go through the Gap and through Pahaquarry. The last fortified house was west of Port Jervis.

=== Tocks Island ===
Due to severe flooding of the Delaware River caused by Hurricane Diane in 1955, the US Army Corps of Engineers asked Congress to authorize the building of a dam at Tocks Island. The necessary area around the Delaware River was acquired through condemnation by the U.S. Government; however, due to constant protests by area residents which were eventually taken up by elected officials such as the Governor of New Jersey, the dam was never built. In 1965, President Johnson signed a law creating the Delaware Water Gap National Recreation Area. Up into the mid-1970s, a total of 15,000 people were asked to vacate their homes and summer cottages before the dam was cancelled; these land takings were incorporated into the Recreation Area in 1978.

== Route description ==
Old Mine Road today is a two-lane paved road from Delaware Water Gap to Port Jervis. There is a campground at Worthington State Forest about six miles north of the gap. The land is farmed with cornfields along the road in certain areas. The rest of the area is forest or fields. At Port Jervis, the road becomes part of U.S. Route 209, which travels north towards Kingston.

== See also ==
- Delaware Water Gap
- High Point State Park
- Stokes State Forest
- Worthington State Forest
- Old Mine Road Historic District

== Notes and references ==
=== Books ===
- Decker, Amelia Stickney. That Ancient Trail. (Trenton, New Jersey: Privately printed, 1942). NO ISBN (Pre-1964).
- Hine, Charles Gilbert. The Old Mine Road. (New Brunswick, New Jersey: Rutgers University Press, 1908). ISBN 0-8135-0426-0
- Kraft, Herbert C. The Dutch, the Indians & the Quest for Copper: Pahaquarry & the Old Mine Road. (West Orange, New Jersey: Seton Hall University Museum, 1996). ISBN 978-0-935137-02-6
- Snell, James P. History of Sussex and Warren Counties, New Jersey, With Illustrations and Biographical Sketches of Its Prominent Men and Pioneers. (Philadelphia: Everts & Peck, 1881). NO ISBN (Pre-1964).

=== Articles ===
- Batko, Alicia C. Searching for the Old Mine Road in Cultural Resources Management Vol. 25 No.3 (National Park Service, 2002).
- Kopczynski, Sue. A Ride Down Old Mine Road in Spanning the Gap Vol. 22, No. 2 (Summer 2000).
- Kopczynski, Sue. "The Dutch Mines: Fact or Myth? in Spanning the Gap Vol. 10, No. 2 (Summer 1998).
