= Walpack Township, New Jersey =

Township in Sussex County, New Jersey, US

- Township
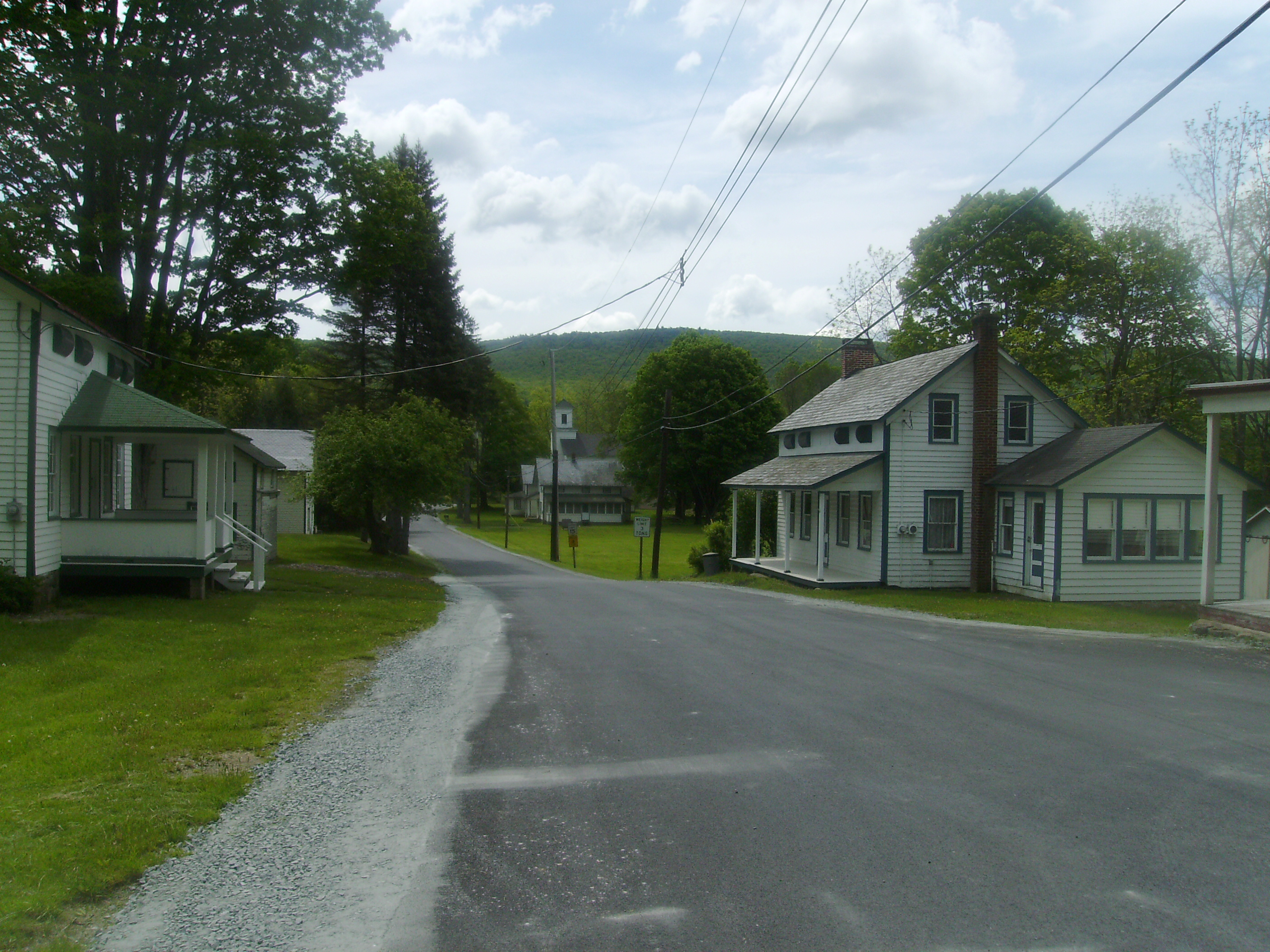
- The downtown of Wallpack Center, New Jersey facing National Park Service Route 615
- Motto: Oldest Municipality in Sussex County
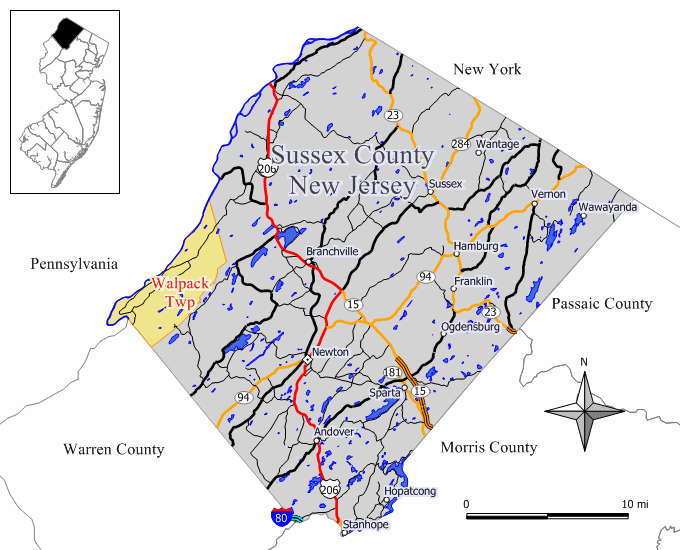
- Location in Sussex County, New Jersey and of Sussex County in New Jersey (upper left)

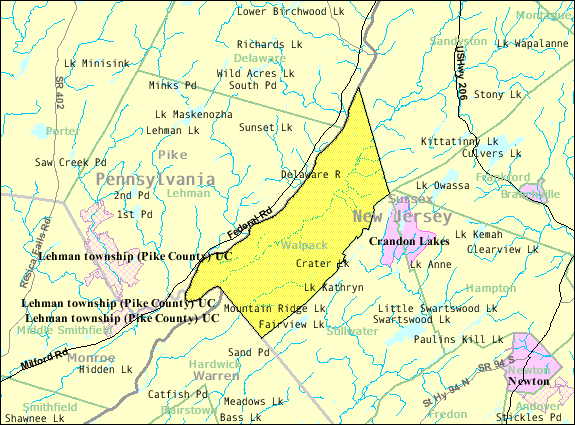
- Census Bureau map of Walpack Township, New Jersey

- Location of Walpack Township in Sussex County Location in New Jersey Location in the United States
- Coordinates: 41.121°N 74.890°W
- Country: United States
- State: New Jersey
- County: Sussex
- Earliest mention: October 26, 1731
- Incorporated: February 21, 1798

Government
  - Type: Township
  - Body: Township Committee
  - Mayor: Victor J. Maglio (R, term ends December 31, 2026)
  - Municipal clerk: Christine M. Von Oesen

Area
  - Total: 24.88 sq mi (64.45 km^{2})
  - Land: 24.24 sq mi (62.77 km^{2})
  - Water: 0.65 sq mi (1.68 km^{2}) 2.60%
  - Rank: 109th of 565 in state 10th of 24 in county
- Elevation: 436 ft (133 m)

Population (2020)
  - Total: 7
  - Estimate (2023): 6
  - Rank: 565th of 565 in state 24th of 24 in county
  - Density: 0.3/sq mi (0.12/km^{2})
  - Rank: 565th of 565 in state 24th of 24 in county
- Time zone: UTC−05:00 (Eastern (EST))
  - Summer (DST): UTC−04:00 (Eastern (EDT))
- ZIP Code: 07881 – Walpack Center
- Area code: 908
- FIPS code: 3403776640
- GNIS feature ID: 0882259
- Website: www.twp.walpack.nj.us

Walpack Township is a township in Sussex County, in the U.S. state of New Jersey. As of the 2020 United States census, the township's population was 7, a decrease of 9 (−56.3%) from the 2010 census count of 16, which in turn reflected a decline of 34 (−82.9%) from the 41 counted in the 2000 census. Walpack Township was the smallest municipality by population and one of only four municipalities in New Jersey with a population under 100 as of the 2020 Census; it had the state's third-smallest population in the 2010 census, behind Tavistock (population 5) and the now-defunct Pine Valley (population 12), both in Camden County.

The township is named from a corruption of the Lenape Native American content word "wahlpeck," which means "turn-hole," or an eddy or whirlpool, a compound of two Native American words, "woa-lac" (a hole), and "tuppeck" (a pool), though other sources attribute the name to mean "very deep water" or "sudden bend of a stream around the base of a rock".

== History ==
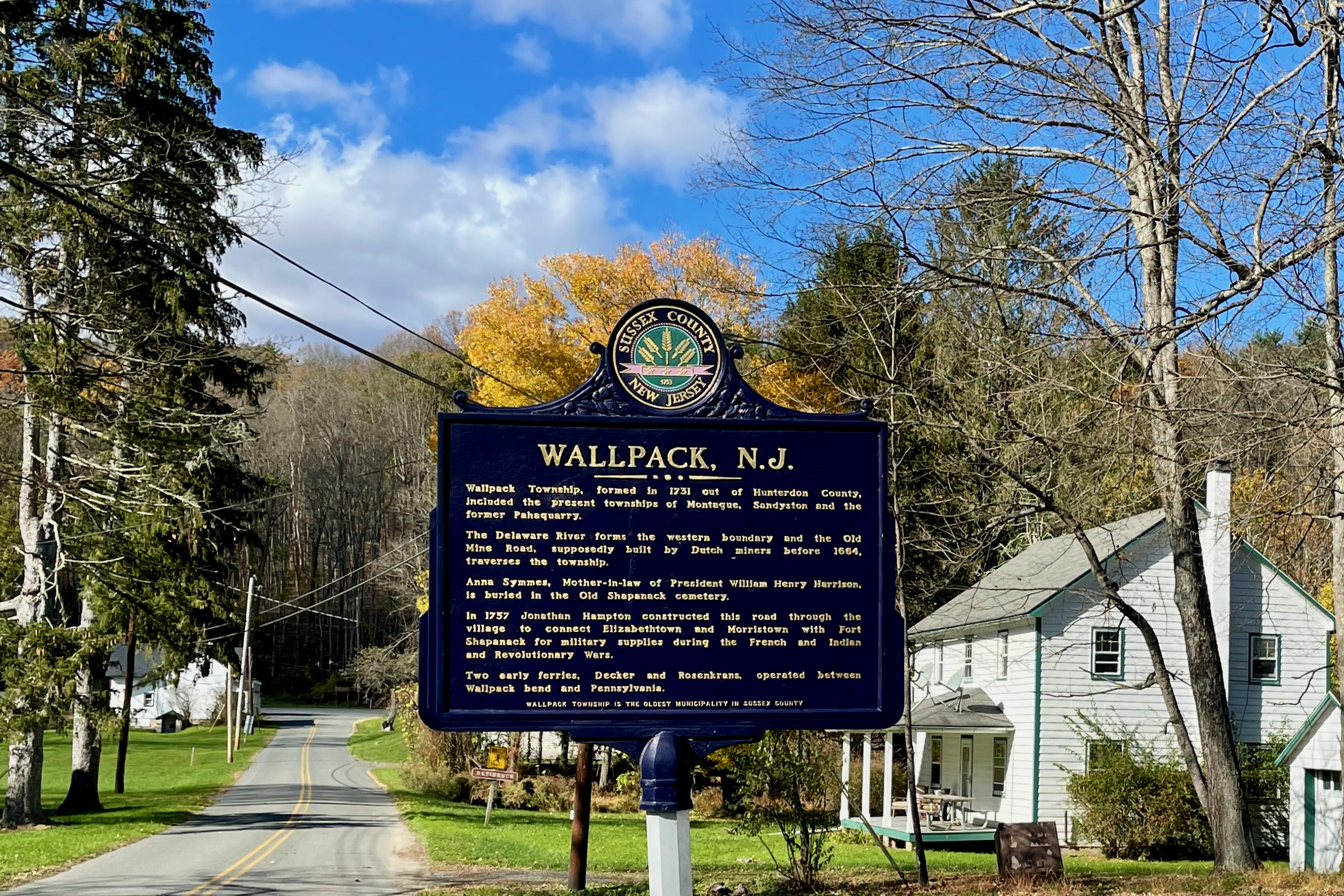
Information sign in Wallpack Center

Walpack Township dates back to October 26, 1731, when it was first mentioned as Walpake in Hunterdon County. The area covered by the present-day township was set off to Morris County upon that county's creation in 1739, and became part of the newly formed Sussex County in 1753. As of April 15, 1754, Walpack's boundaries were defined as a "precinct". Portions of the precinct were taken to form Montague Precinct (March 26, 1759) and Sandyston Precinct (February 26, 1762). Walpack was formally incorporated as a township by an act of the New Jersey Legislature on February 21, 1798. Portions of the township were taken to form the now-defunct Pahaquarry Township in Warren County (December 27, 1824). Territory was gained from Stillwater Township in 1935.

The Andrew Snable House was built in 1801 and was added to the National Register of Historic Places on July 23, 1979. The Wallpack Center Historic District was added to the NRHP on July 17, 1980.

In 1962, following the devastation caused by Hurricanes Connie and Diane in 1955, a proposal was made by Congress for the U.S. Army Corps of Engineers to alleviate flooding on the Delaware River by constructing a dam at the site of Tocks Island. This dam, 10 miles (16 km) south of Walpack, would have created a lake roughly 40 miles (64 km) long and 1 mile (1.6 km) wide. Over the next 15 years, approximately 72,000 acres (29,000 ha) of the surrounding land, including Walpack, were claimed under eminent domain by the government for this project, and many long-time area residents were forced to move out. However, the dam and lake were never actually built:

As the Vietnam War strained federal budgets, the dam project stalled due to persistent concerns about the stability of soil beneath it, rising costs, new environmental laws and local activism. In 1978, Congress protected sections of the Delaware River under the Wild and Scenic River Act, killing the project.

Judge Joseph Stamler of New Jersey Superior Court rejected a proposal for a six-day rock festival to be held in the summer of 1970 on a 400-acre (160 ha) site in the township, leading to the passage of standards for similar events that requires planning for traffic and safety between the organizers and local authorities, and sets limits on duration. Stamler stated that any positive benefits from such an event must be weighed against the "health, safety and welfare of the young, and the potential harm to the public".

== Geography ==
According to the United States Census Bureau, the township had a total area of 24.88 square miles (64.45 km^{2}), including 24.24 square miles (62.77 km^{2}) of land and 0.65 square miles (1.68 km^{2}) of water (2.60%). The township is located in the Minisink Valley that extends from the Delaware Water Gap north to Port Jervis, New York.

Unincorporated communities, localities and place names located partially or completely within the township include Dry Pond, Flat Brook, Flatbrookville, Haneys Mill, Harding Lake, Long Pond and Walpack Center.

The township is bordered by the municipalities of Sandyston Township and Stillwater Township in Sussex County; and by Hardwick Township in Warren County.

== Demographics ==
Historical population
Census	Pop.	Note	%±
1810	591		—
1820	822		39.1%
1830	660	*	−19.7%
1840	728		10.3%
1850	783		7.6%
1860	851		8.7%
1870	647		−24.0%
1880	575		−11.1%
1890	436		−24.2%
1900	371		−14.9%
1910	286		−22.9%
1920	258		−9.8%
1930	178		−31.0%
1940	207	*	16.3%
1950	204		−1.4%
1960	248		21.6%
1970	384		54.8%
1980	150		−60.9%
1990	67		−55.3%
2000	41		−38.8%
2010	16		−61.0%
2020	7		−56.2%
2023 (est.)	6		−14.3%
Population sources: 1810–1920 1840 1850–1870; 1850 1870 1880–1890; 1890–1910 1910–1930; 1940–2000 2000; 2010 2020 * = Territorial change in previous decade.

=== 2010 census ===
The 2010 United States census counted 16 people, 8 households, and 4 families in the township. The population density was 0.7 inhabitants per square mile (0.27/km^{2}). There were 15 housing units at an average density of 0.6 per square mile (0.23/km^{2}). The racial makeup was 93.75% (15) White, 0.00% (0) Black or African American, 0.00% (0) Native American, 0.00% (0) Asian, 0.00% (0) Pacific Islander, 0.00% (0) from other races, and 6.25% (1) from two or more races. Hispanic or Latino of any race were 0.00% (0) of the population.

Of the 8 households, 12.5% had children under the age of 18; 37.5% were married couples living together; 0.0% had a female householder with no husband present and 50.0% were non-families. Of all households, 50.0% were made up of individuals and 25.0% had someone living alone who was 65 years of age or older. The average household size was 2.00 and the average family size was 3.00.

12.5% of the population were under the age of 18, 12.5% from 18 to 24, 18.8% from 25 to 44, 31.3% from 45 to 64, and 25.0% who were 65 years of age or older. The median age was 56.5 years. For every 100 females, the population had 100.0 males. For every 100 females ages 18 and older there were 100.0 males.

The Census Bureau's 2006–2010 American Community Survey showed that (in 2010 inflation-adjusted dollars) median household income was $108,333 (with a margin of error of +/− $155,555) and the median family income was $127,500 (+/− $88,897). Males had a median income of $ (+/− $) versus $57,813 (+/− $26,023) for females. The per capita income for the borough was $36,663 (+/− $14,435). About none of families and none of the population were below the poverty line, including none of those under age 18 and none of those age 65 or over.

=== 2000 census ===
As of the 2000 United States census there were 41 people, 20 households, and 12 families residing in the township. The population density was 1.7 inhabitants per square mile (0.66/km^{2}). There were 34 housing units at an average density of 1.4 per square mile (0.54/km^{2}). The racial makeup of the township was 100.00% White.

There were 20 households, out of which 20.0% had children under the age of 18 living with them, 50.0% were married couples living together, 10.0% had a female householder with no husband present, and 40.0% were non-families. 40.0% of all households were made up of individuals, and 10.0% had someone living alone who was 65 years of age or older. The average household size was 2.05 and the average family size was 2.75.

In the township the population was spread out, with 19.5% under the age of 18, 2.4% from 18 to 24, 19.5% from 25 to 44, 31.7% from 45 to 64, and 26.8% who were 65 years of age or older. The median age was 49 years. For every 100 females, there were 95.2 males. For every 100 females age 18 and over, there were 106.3 males.

The median income for a household in the township was $22,250, and the median income for a family was $22,250. Males had a median income of $46,250 versus $0 for females. The per capita income for the township was $17,624. None of the population and none of the families were below the poverty line.

== Government ==
=== Local government ===
Walpack Township is governed under the Township form of New Jersey municipal government, one of 141 municipalities (of the 564) statewide that use this form, the second-most commonly used form of government in the state. The governing body is comprised of the three-member Township Committee, whose members are elected directly by the voters at-large in partisan elections to serve three-year terms of office on a staggered basis, with one seat coming up for election each year as part of the November general election in a three-year cycle. At an annual reorganization meeting, the Township Committee selects one of its members to serve as Mayor and another as Deputy Mayor.

As of 2024, members of the Walpack Township Committee are Mayor Victor J. Maglio (R, term on committee ends December 31, 2026; term as mayor ends 2024), Deputy Mayor Kelly Happe (R, term on committee ends and term as deputy mayor ends 2024) and James Heigis (R, 2025).

In 2018, the township had an average property tax bill of $450, the lowest in the county, compared to an average bill of $7,626 in Sussex County and $8,767 statewide.

=== Federal, state, and county representation ===
Walpack Township is located in the 7th Congressional District and is part of New Jersey's 24th state legislative district.

For the 119th United States Congress, New Jersey's 7th congressional district is represented by Thomas Kean Jr. (R, Westfield). New Jersey is represented in the United States Senate by Democrats Cory Booker (Newark, term ends 2027) and Andy Kim (Moorestown, term ends 2031).

For the 2026–2027 session, the 24th legislative district of the New Jersey Legislature is represented in the State Senate by Parker Space (R, Wantage Township) and in the General Assembly by Dawn Fantasia (R, Franklin) and Mike Inganamort (R, Chester Township).

Sussex County is governed by a Board of County Commissioners whose five members are elected at-large in partisan elections on a staggered basis, with either one or two seats coming up for election each year. At an annual reorganization meeting held in the beginning of January, the board selects a Commissioner Director and Deputy Director from among its members, with day-to-day supervision of the operation of the county delegated to a County Administrator. As of 2025, Sussex County's Commissioners are Director Jill Space (R, Wantage Township, 2025), Deputy Director Chris Carney (R, Frankford Township, 2027), Jack DeGroot (R, Sussex, 2026), William Hayden (I, Branchville, 2025) and Alan Henderson (R, Lafayette Township, 2027).

Constitutional officers elected on a countywide basis are Clerk Jeffrey M. Parrott (R, Wantage Township, 2026), Sheriff Michael F. Strada (R, Hampton Township, 2025) and Surrogate Gary R. Chiusano (R, Frankford Township, 2028).

=== Politics ===
As of March 2011, there were a total of 22 registered voters in Walpack Township, of which 1 (4.5% vs. 16.5% countywide) was registered as a Democrat, 17 (77.3% vs. 39.3%) were registered as Republicans and 2 (9.1% vs. 44.1%) were registered as Unaffiliated. There were 2 voters registered as Libertarians or Greens. Among the township's 2010 Census population, 137.5% (vs. 65.8% in Sussex County) were registered to vote, including 157.1% of those ages 18 and over (vs. 86.5% countywide).

Gubernatorial election results for Walpack Township
Year	Republican		Democratic		Third party(ies)	
Year	No.	%	No.	%	No.	%
2025	7	77.78%	2	22.22%	0	0.00%
2021	4	80.00%	1	20.00%	0	0.00%
2017	5	83.33%	0	0.00%	1	16.67%
2013	7	77.78%	2	22.22%	0	0.00%
2009	11	91.67%	1	8.33%	0	0.00%
2005	14	70.00%	5	25.00%	1	5.00%

In the 2012 presidential election, Republican Mitt Romney received 10 votes (83.3% vs. 59.4% countywide), ahead of Democrat Barack Obama with 2 votes (16.7% vs. 38.2%) and other candidates with no votes (0.0% vs. 2.1%), among the 12 ballots cast by the township's 18 registered voters, for a turnout of 66.7% (vs. 68.3% in Sussex County). In the 2008 presidential election, Republican John McCain received 14 votes (70.0% vs. 59.2% countywide), ahead of Democrat Barack Obama with 3 votes (15.0% vs. 38.7%) and other candidates with 2 votes (10.0% vs. 1.5%), among the 20 ballots cast by the township's 28 registered voters, for a turnout of 71.4% (vs. 76.9% in Sussex County). In the 2004 presidential election, Republican George W. Bush received 22 votes (78.6% vs. 63.9% countywide), ahead of Democrat John Kerry with 6 votes (21.4% vs. 34.4%) and other candidates with no votes (0.0% vs. 1.3%), among the 28 ballots cast by the township's 35 registered voters, for a turnout of 80.0% (vs. 77.7% in the whole county).

United States presidential election results for Walpack Township 2024 2020 2016 2012 2008 2004
Year	Republican		Democratic		Third party(ies)	
Year	No.	%	No.	%	No.	%
2024	7	87.50%	1	12.50%	0	0.00%
2020	8	72.73%	3	27.27%	0	0.00%
2016	8	66.67%	4	33.33%	0	0.00%
2012	10	83.33%	2	16.67%	0	0.00%
2008	14	73.68%	3	15.79%	2	10.53%
2004	22	78.57%	6	21.43%	0	0.00%

In the 2013 gubernatorial election, Republican Chris Christie received 77.8% of the vote (7 cast), ahead of Democrat Barbara Buono with 22.2% (2 votes), and other candidates receiving no votes, among the 9 ballots cast by the township's 19 registered voters, for a turnout of 47.4%. In the 2009 gubernatorial election, Republican Chris Christie received 11 votes (91.7% vs. 63.3% countywide), ahead of Democrat Jon Corzine with one vote (8.3% vs. 25.7%), Independent Chris Daggett with no votes (0.0% vs. 9.1%) and other candidates with no votes (0.0% vs. 1.3%), among the 12 ballots cast by the township's 23 registered voters, yielding a 52.2% turnout (vs. 52.3% in the county).

United States Senate election results for Walpack Township1
Year	Republican		Democratic		Third party(ies)	
Year	No.	%	No.	%	No.	%
2024	7	77.78%	2	22.22%	0	0.00%
2018	5	62.50%	1	12.50%	2	25.00%
2012	9	75.00%	3	25.00%	0	0.00%
2006	15	68.18%	7	31.82%	0	0.00%

United States Senate election results for Walpack Township2
Year	Republican		Democratic		Third party(ies)	
Year	No.	%	No.	%	No.	%
2020	8	72.73%	3	27.27%	0	0.00%
2014	6	85.71%	1	14.29%	0	0.00%
2013	6	85.71%	1	14.29%	0	0.00%
2008	13	65.00%	5	25.00%	2	10.00%

== Education ==
Students in kindergarten through sixth grade attend the schools of the Sandyston-Walpack Consolidated School District, together with students from Sandyston Township. The school is located in the Layton section of Sandyston Township. As of the 2022–23 school year, the district, comprised of one school, had an enrollment of 120 students and 14.8 classroom teachers (on an FTE basis), for a student–teacher ratio of 8.1:1. In the 2016–17 school year, Sandyston-Walpack had the 26th smallest enrollment of any school district in the state, with 149 students.

Students in seventh through twelfth grade from Sandyston and Walpack Townships for public school attend Kittatinny Regional High School located in Hampton Township, which also serves students who reside in Fredon Township and Stillwater Township. The high school is located on a 96-acre (39 ha) campus in Hampton Township, about seven minutes outside of the county seat of Newton. Kittatinny Regional High School was recognized as a National Blue Ribbon School of Excellence in 1997–98. As of the 2022–23 school year, the high school had an enrollment of 781 students and 79.5 classroom teachers (on an FTE basis), for a student–teacher ratio of 9.8:1.

== Transportation ==
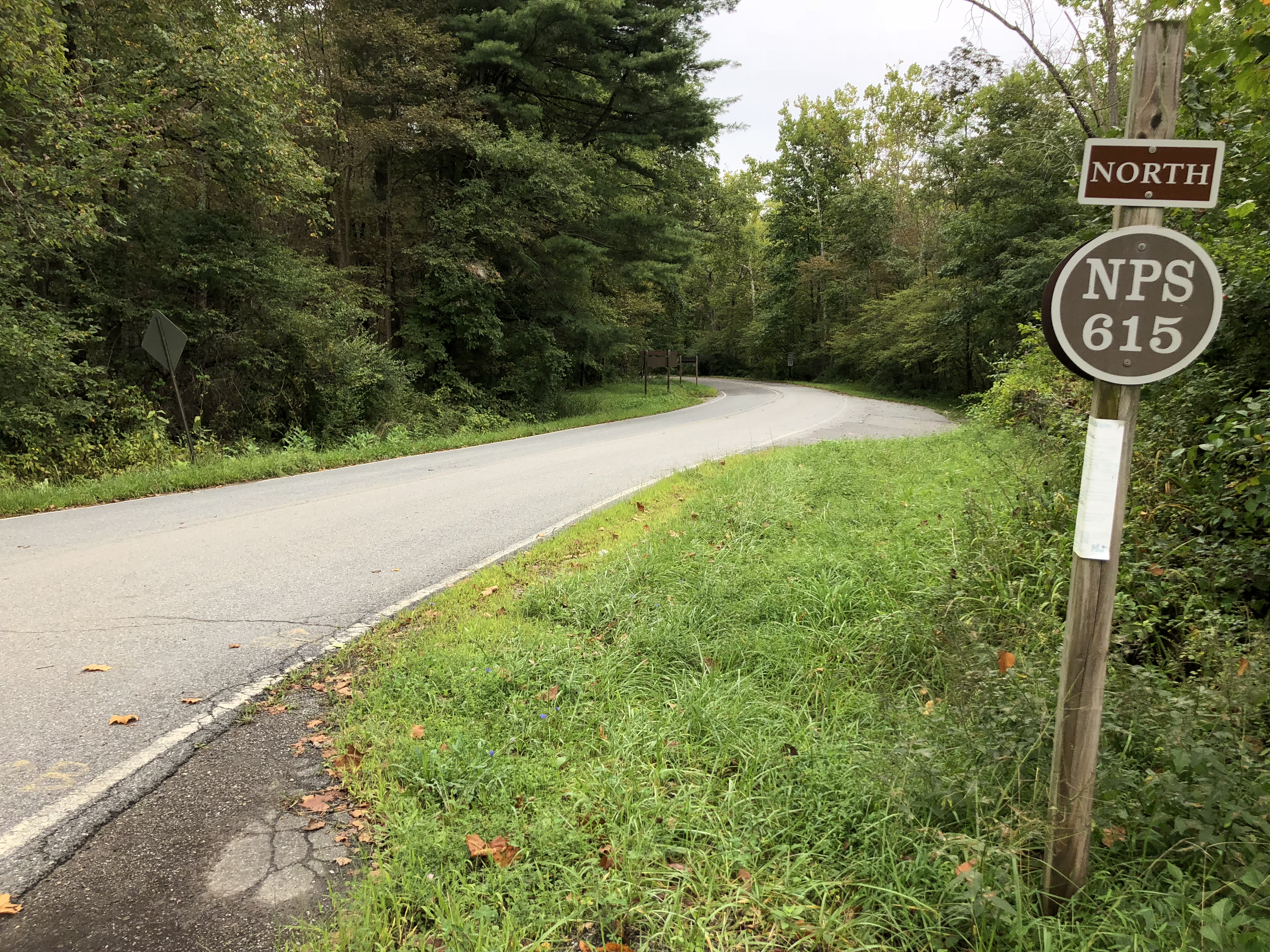
National Park Service Route 615 North in Walpack Township

As of May 2010, the township had a total of 20.01 miles (32.20 km) of roadways, all of which were maintained by the municipality.

Signed routes in the township include National Park Service Route 615.

== Notable people ==
People who were born in, residents of, or otherwise closely associated with Walpack Township include:

- Frank Chapot (1932–2016), Olympic silver medalist equestrian

== See also ==
- Van Campen's Inn
