= Tocks Island Dam controversy =

1950s proposal to build a dam on the Delaware River

Coordinates: 41.0210°N 75.0630°W

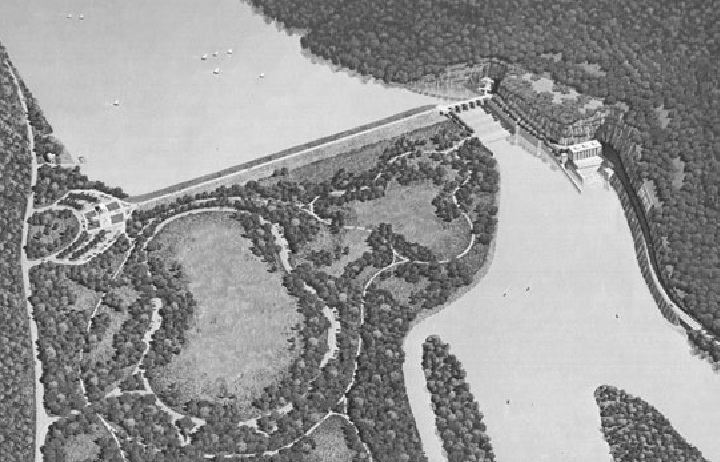
Proposed Tocks Island Dam by U.S. Army Corps of Engineers

A 1950s proposal to construct a dam near Tocks Island across the Delaware River was met with considerable controversy and protest. Tocks Island is located in the Delaware River a short distance north from the Delaware Water Gap. In order to control damaging flooding and provide clean water to supply New York City and Philadelphia, the U.S. Army Corps of Engineers proposed building a dam. When completed, the Tocks Island Dam would have created a 37-mile (60-km) long lake between Pennsylvania and New Jersey, with depths of up to 140 feet. This lake and the land surrounding were to be organized as the Tocks Island National Recreation Area. Although the dam was never built, 72,000 acres (291 km²) of land were acquired by condemnation and eminent domain. This incited environmental protesters and embittered local residents displaced by the project's preparations when their property was condemned. After the Tocks Island Dam project was withdrawn, the lands were transferred to the oversight of the National Park Service which reorganized them to establish the Delaware Water Gap National Recreation Area.

== Tocks Island Dam ==
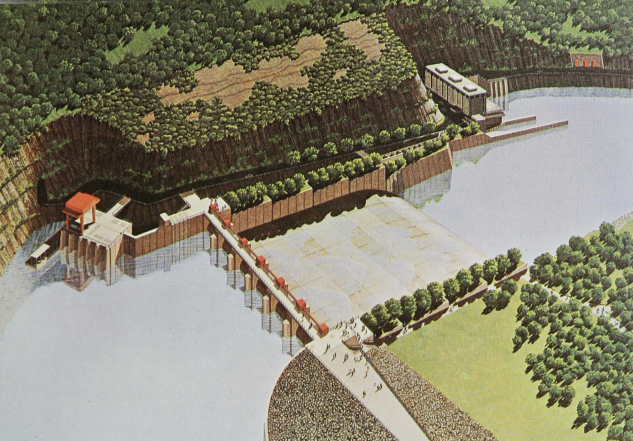
Proposed dam and spillway on the New Jersey bank

Tocks Island is a small island located a short distance north of the Delaware Water Gap in the Delaware River between New Jersey and Pennsylvania. It is part of Hardwick Township, in Warren County, New Jersey. The site was proposed for dam construction several times by the Corps of Engineers, beginning in 1934 and again in 1939. Geological studies after 1939 indicated that the damsite was unsuitable for construction. Flooding in the Delaware basin in 1955 restarted proposals for a flood control program. The 1962 design assumed earth construction in a slightly different location. The proposed dam was to be 3,200 feet (980 m) long and 160 feet (49 m) high, mainly of earthfill construction. At the New Jersey abutment a section of concrete gravity dam structure was to accommodate overflow spillways controlled by tainter gates, together with an intake structure for a powerhouse just downstream. The reservoir created by the dam was to extend 37 miles (60 km) upstream to Port Jervis, New York, covering 12,000 acres (4,900 ha).

== History ==
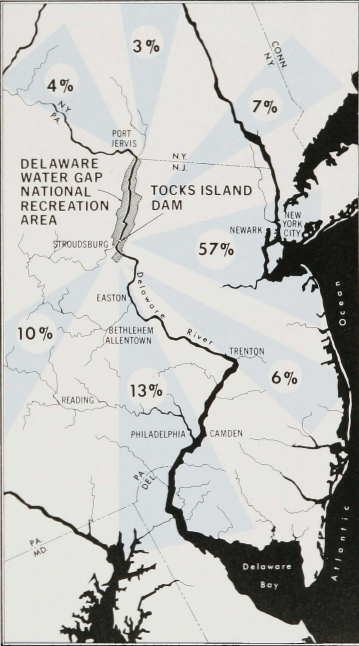
Approximate apportionment of visitor sources

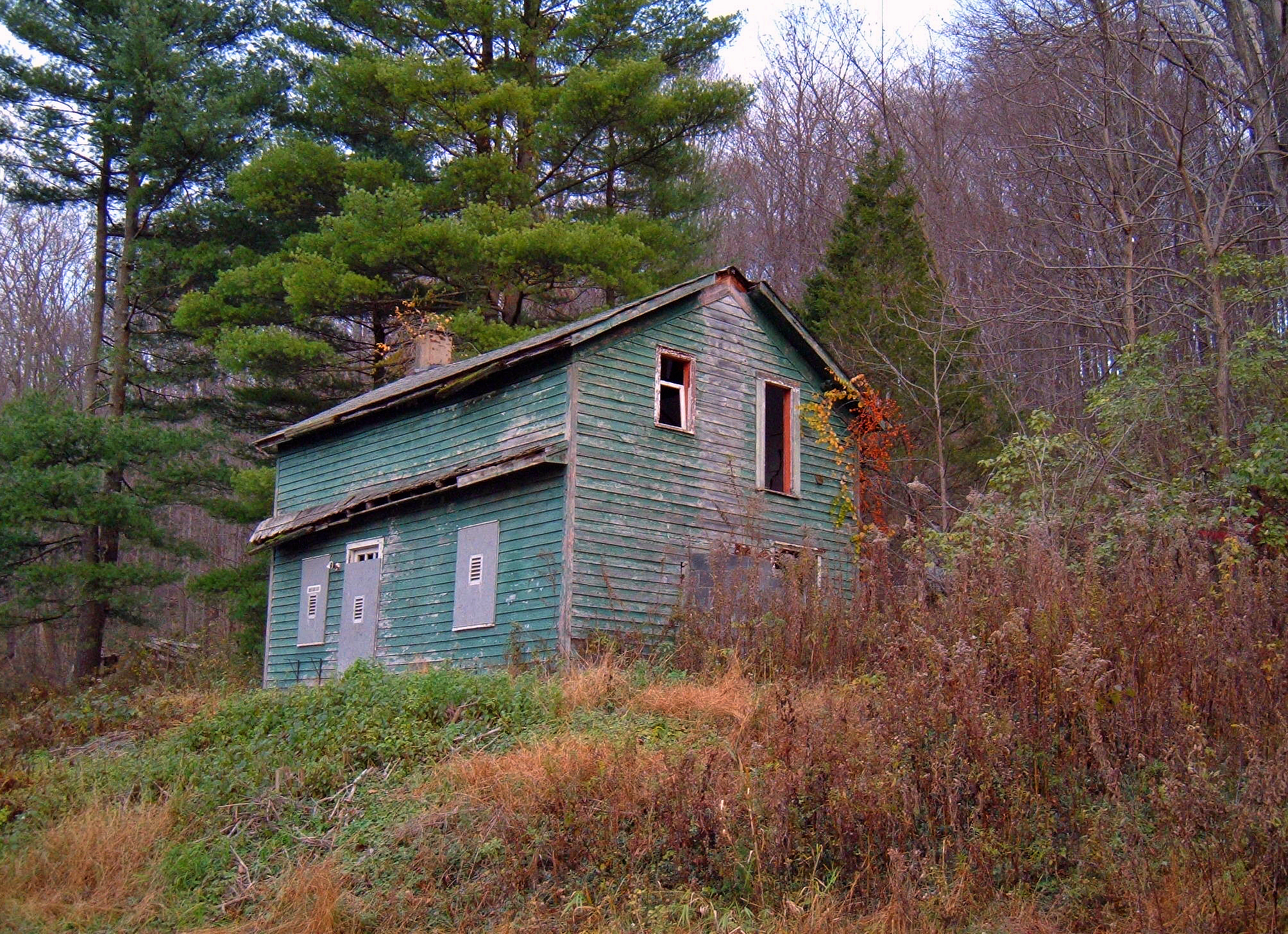
A house in the project area, now abandoned

The Tocks Island Dam Project was under consideration prior to the 1955 flood, which killed several dozen people and damaged the Delaware River basin severely. The need for flood control brought the issue to the national level, and in 1962, Congress authorized the construction of the dam. The Tocks Island National Recreation Area was to be established around the lake with 100-mile shorelines, which would offer recreation activities such as hunting, hiking, fishing, and boating with 10.5 million annual visitors projected. The area was redesignated by Congress as Delaware Water Gap National Recreation Area in 1965. In addition to flood control and recreation, the dam with a pumped storage facility could be used to generate hydroelectric power with average annual generation of more than 900 MWh. More significantly, the water stored in the lake would be pumped to supply water to the cities of New York and Philadelphia.

The United States government began acquiring, often by eminent domain, land from residents that lay within the boundaries approved for this unprecedented recreation area. By 1975, the government acquired 6,000 properties which were about two‐thirds of the 72,000 acres (113 sq mi) required, and forced out 4,000 families. As houses were abandoned during the acquisition, squatters had been moving in. In 1971, the governments started bulldozing some homes to force the squatters out. Today, there are few existing structures from the original town of Dingmans Ferry, Pennsylvania, The original post office sign was saved from bulldozers by John Perretti, and there are few remaining buildings from Bushkill, Pennsylvania and other surrounding areas.

On the New Jersey side, much of the area of Pahaquarry Township was taken over, leaving the community with no more than a few dozen residents. On July 2, 1997, Pahaquarry Township, whose population had dwindled to fewer than a dozen people, was dissolved and incorporated into Hardwick Township.

Protesters whose land had been acquired raised the issue of unfair acquisition of land. Two such individuals, Nancy Shukaitis and Ruth Jones, formed a group called the Delaware Valley Conservation Association. Along with other supporters, they attended government hearings and meetings of the U.S. Army Corps of Engineers. Another individual who was instrumental in bringing national attention to the issue was Justice William O. Douglas, who fell in love with the area after visiting Sunfish Pond with his wife.

The decision on the future of the project lay with the Delaware River Basin Commission, the governing board of which included the governors of the four states in the Delaware River Basin (New York, Pennsylvania, New Jersey and Delaware) and a federal representative who reported to the U.S. Secretary of the Interior. The project's momentum was slowed in the early 70s by objections voiced by New Jersey Governor William T. Cahill, who was concerned with land acquisition issues raised by local residents, by the potential adverse environmental impacts of the project, and by the costs that would be imposed on New Jersey to provide sewerage and highways to serve growth in Northwest New Jersey that would be prompted by the recreation area that would surround the dam. The recreation area was needed to provide the economic benefits needed to allow the U.S. Army Corps of Engineers, which would build the dam, to demonstrate that it had a positive ratio of benefits to cost. The further studies prompted by Cahill's objections and by question raised by his successor, Governor Brendan T. Byrne, in 1974 revealed that better and more economical options existed to reduce flood damage and improve water supply than the dam. The dam was disapproved by a majority vote of the Delaware River Basin Commission in 1975, led by New Jersey, New York and Delaware, dissented by Pennsylvania, and abstained by the United States.

Financial problems also contributed to the demise of the project. With the United States funding the Vietnam War, the allocation of $384 million needed to fund the dam and lake became less feasible. Finally, the geology of the area was too unstable to build the earthen dam. The bedrock could not support what would be the largest dam project east of the Mississippi River.

In 1992, the project was reviewed again and rejected with the provision that it would be revisited ten years later. In 2002, after extensive research, the Tocks Island Dam Project was officially de-authorized.

Today, the land is preserved by the National Park Service as the Delaware Water Gap National Recreation Area.

A video documentary, Controversy on the Delaware: A Look Upstream at the Tocks Island Dam Project, was filmed in 2006 that investigates the Tocks Island Dam Project (available on Youtube).

== See also ==
- Salt Water Barrier (Delaware River), an alternative proposal for impoundment of fresh water in the lower Delaware River.

== Bibliography ==
- Albert, Richard C. Damming the Delaware: The Rise and Fall of Tocks Island Dam. University Park, Pa.: Pennsylvania State University Press, 1987.
- Feiveson, Harold, Frank Sinden, and Robert Socolow. Boundaries of Analysis: an Inquiry Into the Tocks Island Dam Controversy. Cambridge, Mass.: Ballinger Publishing Company, 1976.
