= National Register of Historic Places listings in Monroe County, Pennsylvania =

Location of Monroe County in Pennsylvania

This is a list of the National Register of Historic Places listings in Monroe County, Pennsylvania.

This is intended to be a complete list of the properties and districts on the National Register of Historic Places in Monroe County, Pennsylvania, United States. The locations of National Register properties and districts for which the latitude and longitude coordinates are included below, may be seen in a map.

There are 22 properties and districts listed on the National Register in the county. Another 3 properties were once listed but have been removed.

This National Park Service list is complete through NPS recent listings posted January 23, 2026.

== Current listings ==
	Name on the Register	Image	Date listed	Location	City or town	Description
1	Academy Hill Historic District	Academy Hill Historic District	January 4, 1990 (#89002258)	Roughly bounded by Sarah, 8th, Fulmer and 5th Streets; 40°59′19″N 75°11′42″W	Stroudsburg	
2	Christ Hamilton United Lutheran Church and Cemetery	Christ Hamilton United Lutheran Church and Cemetery	June 11, 1980 (#80003573)	Bossardsville Road; 40°55′33″N 75°17′24″W	Hamilton Township	
3	Cold Spring Farm Springhouse	Cold Spring Farm Springhouse	August 24, 1979 (#79000246)	Northeast of East Stroudsburg; 41°03′44″N 75°01′09″W	Middle Smithfield Township	
4	Delaware, Lackawanna and Western Railroad Water Gap Station	Delaware, Lackawanna and Western Railroad Water Gap Station	November 27, 2002 (#02001431)	Waring Drive; 40°58′56″N 75°08′12″W	Delaware Water Gap	
5	East Stroudsburg Armory	East Stroudsburg Armory	May 9, 1991 (#91000510)	271 Washington Street; 40°59′35″N 75°11′08″W	East Stroudsburg	
6	East Stroudsburg Railroad Station	East Stroudsburg Railroad Station	June 27, 1980 (#80003572)	Crystal Street; 40°59′56″N 75°10′55″W	East Stroudsburg	Partially destroyed in a 2009 fire. Will either be demolished or moved to Miller Park.
7	Fenner-Snyder Mill	Fenner-Snyder Mill	May 13, 1976 (#76001650)	U.S. Route 209, north of Sciota; 40°56′08″N 75°18′50″W	Hamilton Township	
8	Frantz School	Frantz School	September 16, 2022 (#100008137)	485 Church Rd. 40°52′23″N 75°27′16″W	Kunkletown	
9	Kitson Woolen Mill	Kitson Woolen Mill	January 12, 1984 (#84003501)	411 Main Street; 40°59′13″N 75°11′23″W	Stroudsburg	
10	John Michael Farm	John Michael Farm	July 8, 1980 (#80000355)	East of Stroudsburg; 41°02′06″N 75°03′25″W	Middle Smithfield Township	
11	Monroe County Courthouse	Monroe County Courthouse	April 18, 1979 (#09000097)	Seventh and Monroe Sts. 40°59′12″N 75°11′40″W	Stroudsburg	
12	Parkside Chapel	Parkside Chapel	October 7, 2020 (#100005656)	5335 Paradise Valley Rd. 41°05′57″N 75°14′55″W	Henryville	
13	Pocono Manor Historic District	Pocono Manor Historic District	April 11, 1997 (#97000287)	Roughly bounded by Pennsylvania Route 314, Lake and Cliff Roads, and Summit Avenue, south of Mount Pocono; 41°05′51″N 75°22′28″W	Pocono and Tobyhanna Townships	
14	Quiet Valley Farm	Quiet Valley Farm	April 23, 1973 (#73001642)	Southwest of Stroudsburg off U.S. Route 209; 40°57′25″N 75°15′03″W	Hamilton Township	
15	Ross Common Manor	Ross Common Manor	November 22, 1978 (#78002432)	South of Saylorsburg on Pennsylvania Route 115; 40°51′54″N 75°18′23″W	Ross Township	
16	Schoonover Mountain House	Schoonover Mountain House	August 21, 1979 (#79000245)	South of Bushkill; 41°04′44″N 75°00′48″W	Middle Smithfield Township	
17	Shawnee-Minisink Site	Shawnee-Minisink Site	November 9, 2007 (#07001161)	Confluence of Brodhead Creek and the Delaware River; 40°59′25″N 75°08′03″W	Smithfield Township	
18	Capt. Jacob Shoemaker House	Capt. Jacob Shoemaker House	July 17, 1979 (#79000247)	Off Legislative Route 45012 south of Bushkill; 41°04′51″N 75°01′55″W	Middle Smithfield Township	
19	Shrawder-Sittig House	Shrawder-Sittig House	June 22, 2023 (#100008144)	553 River Rd. 41°00′44″N 75°06′38″W	Smithfield Township	
20	Stroud Mansion	Stroud Mansion	August 1, 1979 (#79002297)	Main and 9th Streets; 40°59′04″N 75°11′55″W	Stroudsburg	
21	John Turn Farm	John Turn Farm	July 23, 1979 (#79000249)	Northeast of Stroudsburg; 41°03′30″N 75°01′25″W	Middle Smithfield Township	
22	Zion Lutheran Church	Zion Lutheran Church	November 9, 1972 (#72000094)	Off River Road east of East Stroudsburg; 41°02′26″N 75°02′19″W	Middle Smithfield Township	

== Former listings ==
	Name on the Register	Image	Date listed	Date removed	Location	City or town	Description
1	Henryville House		January 6, 1987 (#86003572)	December 14, 2006	Junction of Pennsylvania Routes 191 and 715	Henryville	
2	Swiftwater Inn		June 4, 1976 (#76001651)	January 7, 2010	Pennsylvania Route 611 in Swiftwater; 41°05′39″N 75°19′40″W	Pocono Township	Demolished 2007 as structurally unsound.
3	Worthington Hall	Worthington Hall	April 14, 1978 (#78002433)	December 18, 1986	Worthington Avenue at Shawnee-on-the-Delaware; 41°00′46″N 75°06′32″W	Smithfield Township	Destroyed by arsonist on June 24, 1985. The rebuilt hall shown here is a copy of the original.

== See also ==
- List of National Historic Landmarks in Pennsylvania
- National Register of Historic Places listings in Pennsylvania
- List of Pennsylvania state historical markers in Monroe County
