= Marie Zimmerman =

Marie Zimmerman may refer to:

- Marie-Jo Zimmermann (born 1951), French politician
- Marie Kunkel Zimmerman (1864–1953), American soprano who composed the suffragist anthem "Votes for Women: Suffrage Rallying Song" as Marie Zimmerman
- Marie Zimmermann (1879–1972) was an American designer
