= Green Eyes (1934 film) =

1934 film by Richard Thorpe

- DVD cover
- Directed by: Richard Thorpe
- Written by: Andrew Moses (continuity)
- Based on: The Murder of Steven Kester (1931 novel) by Harriette Ashbrook
- Produced by: George R. Batcheller
- Cinematography: M.A. Anderson
- Production company: Chesterfield Pictures
- Distributed by: Chesterfield Pictures
- Release date: June 15, 1934
- Running time: 67-68 minutes
- Country: United States
- Language: English

Green Eyes is a 1934 American pre-Code Chesterfield Pictures film directed by Richard Thorpe.

== Plot ==
During a masked party Stephen Kester (Claude Gillingwater) is found dead in the closet of his room, three stab wounds in his back. Suspicion falls on everyone at the party, especially Kester's granddaughter Jean (Shirley Grey) and her fiancé Cliff Miller (William Bakewell), who fled the house after disabling the other cars and cutting the phone lines. As Inspector Crofton (John Wray) and Detective Regan (Ben Hendricks Jr.) investigate they are shadowed and helped along by a mystery writer, Bill Tracy (Charles Starrett).

== Cast ==
- Shirley Grey as Jean Kester
- Charles Starrett as Bill Tracy
- Claude Gillingwater as Stephen Kester
- John Wray as Inspector Crofton
- William Bakewell as Cliff Miller
- Dorothy Revier as Mrs. Pritchard
- Ben Hendricks Jr. as Detective Regan
- Alden Chase as Mr. Pritchard
- Arthur Clayton as Roger Hall
- Aggie Herring as Dora, housekeeper for the Kesters
- Edward Keane as Raynor
- Edward Le Saint as Banker
- Robert Frazer as Broker
