= Delaware Water Gap station (Delaware, Lackawanna and Western Railroad) =

DELAWARE WATER GAP
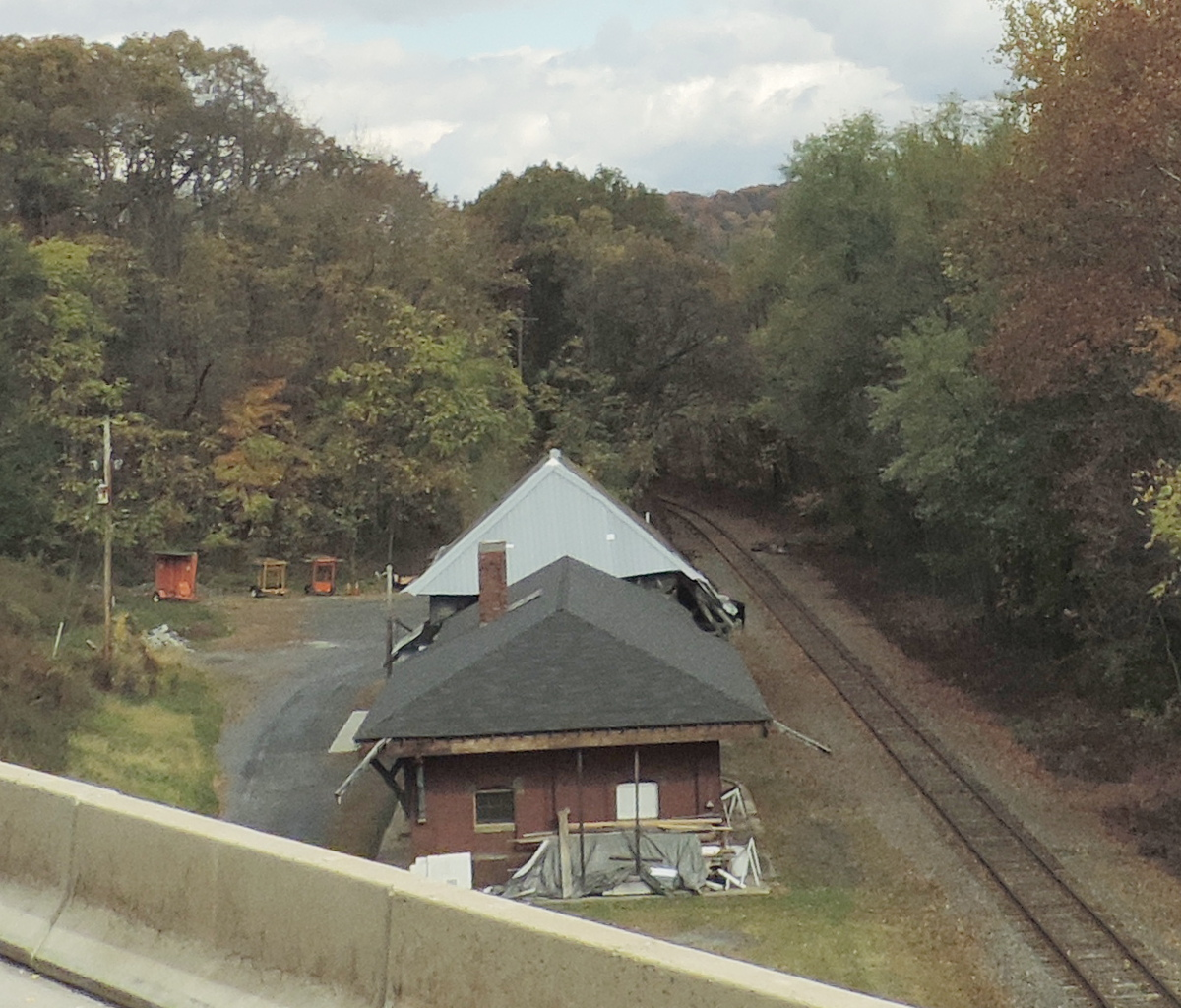
- The Delaware Water Gap station in 2014 from Interstate 80.

General information
- Location: End of Oak Street near Interstate 80, Delaware Water Gap, Pennsylvania 18327
- Tracks: 2

Other information
- Station code: 77

History
- Opened: May 13, 1856
- Closed: c. March 1953

Former services
Preceding station	Delaware, Lackawanna and Western Railroad	Following station
East Stroudsburg toward Buffalo	Main Line	Blairstown toward Hoboken
Preceding station	Pennsylvania Railroad	Following station
East Stroudsburg Terminus	Belvidere Delaware Railroad	Manunka Chunk toward Trenton
- Delaware, Lackawanna and Western Railroad Water Gap Station
- U.S. National Register of Historic Places
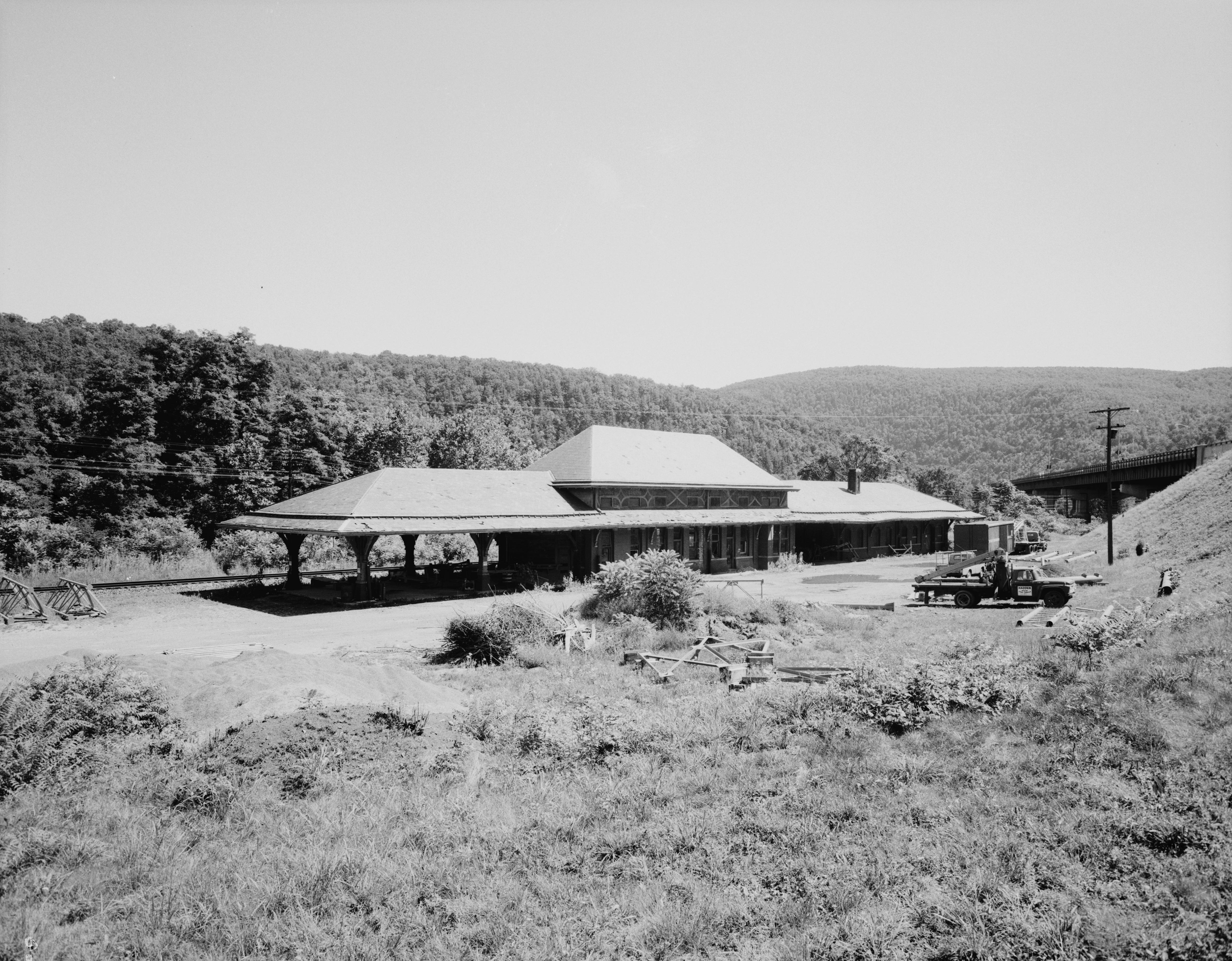

- Location within Pennsylvania Location within the United States
- Location: Waring Drive, Delaware Water Gap, Pennsylvania
- Coordinates: 40°58′56″N 75°8′12″W
- Area: less than one acre
- Built: 1903
- Architect: Nies, Frank, J.
- Architectural style: Late Victorian
- NRHP reference No.: 02001431
- Added to NRHP: November 27, 2002
Location

The Delaware, Lackawanna and Western Railroad Water Gap Station is located in Delaware Water Gap, Monroe County, Pennsylvania. Service to Delaware Water Gap along what became known as the Delaware, Lackawanna and Western Railroad started on May 13, 1856. The station structure was designed by architect Frank J. Nies and built in 1903. It consists of two separate one-story brick buildings, a station house and freight house, joined by a common concrete platform and slate covered hipped roof. It is reflective of the Late Victorian style. The station closed to passenger service in March 1953, and was sold to the Borough in 1958. It is said to sit just outside Delaware Water Gap National Recreation Area, though it appears within the area's boundary on maps.

The station was added to the National Register of Historic Places on November 27, 2002.

== See also ==
- National Register of Historic Places listings in Monroe County, Pennsylvania
