= McMichael Creek =

Tributary of Pocono Creek in Northeastern Pennsylvania

Coordinates: 40.96366°N 75.23142°W

McMichael Creek is a 21.7-mile-long (34.9 km) tributary of Pocono Creek in the Pocono Mountains in Northeastern Pennsylvania.

The tributary Appenzell Creek joins McMichael Creek near the village of Sciota.

McMichael Creek drops off the Pocono Plateau and joins Pocono Creek in Stroudsburg.

McMichael Creek is widely owned by the Pohoqualine Fish Association.

McMichael Creek is primarily known for its trout population, including brook, rainbow, and brown trout.

== See also ==
- Fenner–Snyder Mill
- List of rivers of Pennsylvania
