= Fenner–Snyder Mill =

- Fenner-Snyder Mill
- U.S. National Register of Historic Places
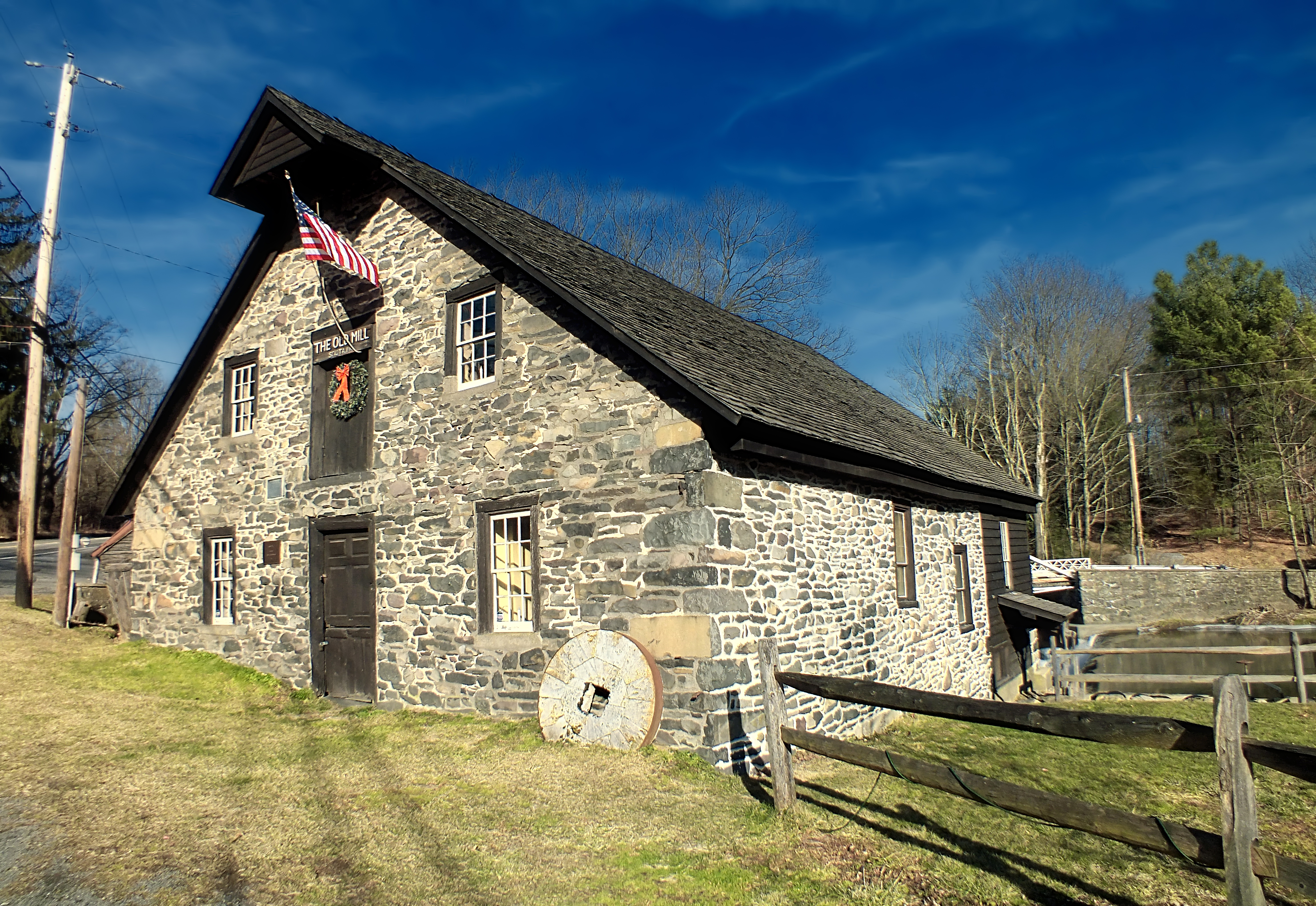
- Fenner-Snyder Mill, 2012

- Location within Pennsylvania Location within the United States
- Location: U.S. Route 209, north of Sciota, Hamilton Township, Pennsylvania
- Coordinates: 40°56′8″N 75°18′50″W
- Area: 1 acre (0.40 ha)
- Built: 1730
- Built by: Fenner, Bernhard
- NRHP reference No.: 76001650
- Added to NRHP: May 13, 1976

The Fenner–Snyder Mill, also known as Brinker's Mill and the Old Mill, is a historic grist mill located on the McMichael Creek in the village of Sciota in Hamilton Township, Monroe County, Pennsylvania. The mill was built in 1730, and is a large 2 1/2-story fieldstone and sided banked building. It has a tin roof added about 1860. It was in continuous milling operation until mid-April 1954. In 1974, the mill was donated to Hamilton Township with the understanding that it would be used for “historical, cultural, and governmental purposes.”

It was added to the National Register of Historic Places on May 13, 1976.

== See also ==
- National Register of Historic Places listings in Monroe County, Pennsylvania
