= Middle Smithfield Township, Pennsylvania =

Township in Pennsylvania, US

- Township
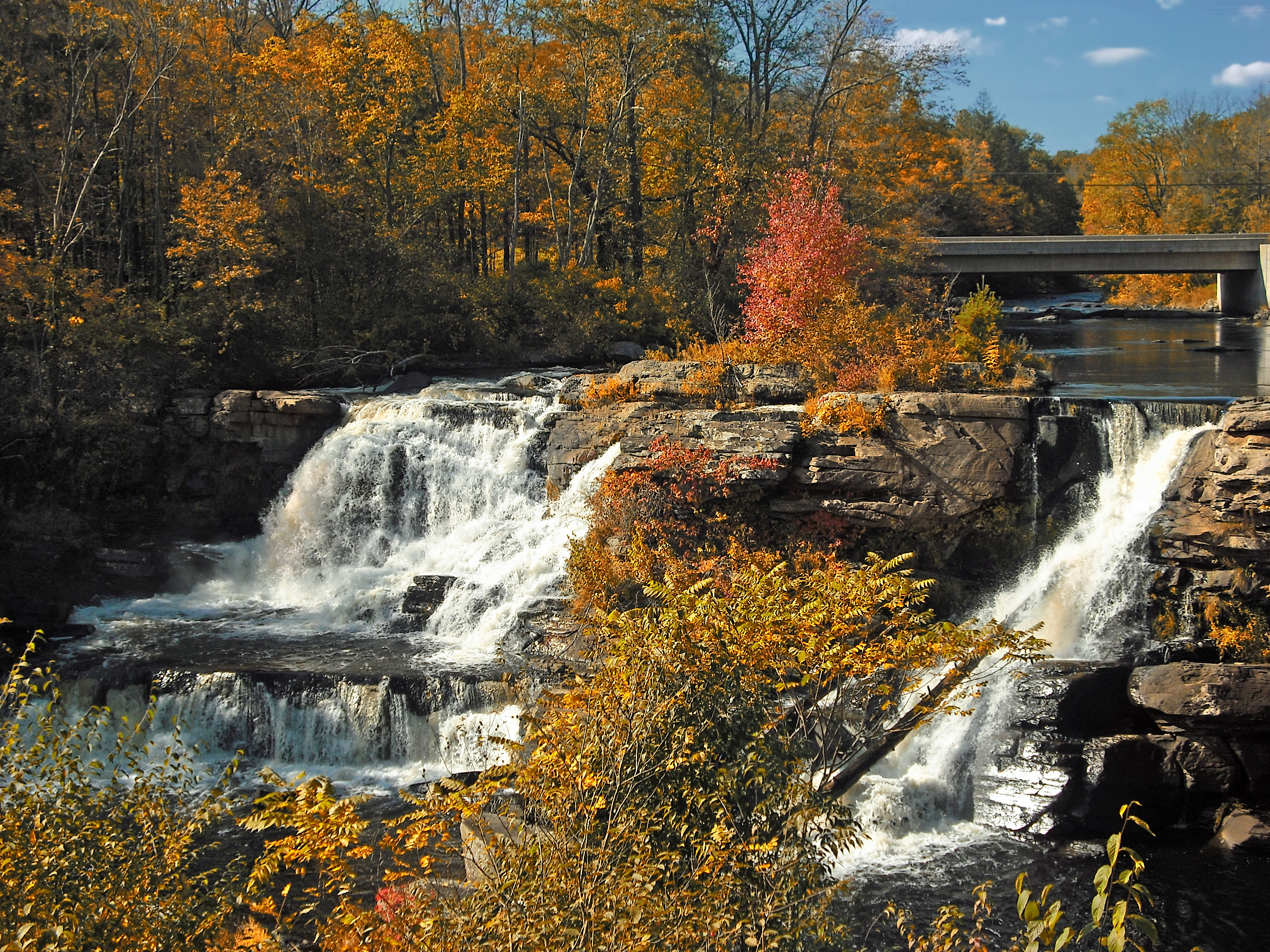
- Resica Falls in Middle Smithfield Township

- Seal

- Location of Pennsylvania in the United States
- Coordinates: 41°05′00″N 74°59′35″W
- Country: United States
- State: Pennsylvania
- County: Monroe

Area
  - Total: 54.23 sq mi (140.46 km^{2})
  - Land: 53.16 sq mi (137.68 km^{2})
  - Water: 1.07 sq mi (2.78 km^{2})
- Elevation: 636 ft (194 m)

Population (2020)
  - Total: 16,014 ▲
  - Estimate (2021): 16,107
  - Density: 294.4/sq mi (113.65/km^{2})
- Time zone: UTC-5 (EST)
  - Summer (DST): UTC-4 (EDT)
- Area code: 570
- FIPS code: 42-089-49080
- Website: www.middlesmithfieldtownship.com

Middle Smithfield Township is a township in Monroe County, Pennsylvania, United States. The population was 16,014 at the 2020 census.

== History ==
The Cold Spring Farm Springhouse, John Michael Farm, Schoonover Mountain House, Capt. Jacob Shoemaker House, John Turn Farm, Zion Lutheran Church are located in Delaware Water Gap National Recreation Area at Middle Smithfield Township and listed on the National Register of Historic Places.

== Geography ==
According to the U.S. Census Bureau, the township has a total area of 54.2 square miles (140.2 km^{2}), of which 53.1 square miles (137.6 km^{2}) is land and 1.0 square mile (2.6 km^{2}) (1.88%) is water. It contains part of the census-designated place of Saw Creek.

== Demographics ==
Historical population
Census	Pop.	Note	%±
2000	11,495		—
2010	15,997		39.2%
2020	16,014		0.1%
2021 (est.)	16,107		0.6%
U.S. Decennial Census

As of the census of 2000, there were 11,495 people, 3,973 households, and 3,031 families residing in the township. The population density was 216.3 inhabitants per square mile (83.5/km^{2}). There were 6,021 housing units at an average density of 113.3 per square mile (43.7/km^{2}). The racial makeup of the township was 85.24% White, 7.66% African American, 0.22% Native American, 1.31% Asian, 0.01% Pacific Islander, 3.18% from other races, and 2.38% from two or more races. Hispanic or Latino of any race were 8.61% of the population.

There were 3,973 households, out of which 42.8% had children under the age of 18 living with them, 63.4% were married couples living together, 7.9% had a female householder with no husband present, and 23.7% were non-families. 17.6% of all households were made up of individuals, and 5.5% had someone living alone who was 65 years of age or older. The average household size was 2.89 and the average family size was 3.29.

In the township the population was spread out, with 30.9% under the age of 18, 6.1% from 18 to 24, 32.3% from 25 to 44, 21.8% from 45 to 64, and 9.0% who were 65 years of age or older. The median age was 36 years. For every 100 females, there were 102.6 males. For every 100 females age 18 and over, there were 98.9 males.

The median income for a household in the township was $50,435, and the median income for a family was $54,821. Males had a median income of $40,852 versus $27,868 for females. The per capita income for the township was $20,235. About 2.8% of families and 4.5% of the population were below the poverty line, including 4.8% of those under age 18 and 6.1% of those age 65 or over.

United States presidential election results for Middle Smithfield Township, Pennsylvania
Year	Republican		Democratic		Third party(ies)	
Year	No.	%	No.	%	No.	%
2024	3,608	45.57%	4,221	53.32%	88	1.11%
2020	2,990	40.72%	4,258	57.99%	95	1.29%
2016	2,674	43.57%	3,263	53.17%	200	3.26%
2012	2,092	39.86%	3,082	58.72%	75	1.43%
2008	2,135	37.57%	3,503	61.65%	44	0.77%
2004	1,848	49.91%	1,825	49.28%	30	0.81%
2000	1,665	51.47%	1,471	45.47%	99	3.06%

== Climate ==
According to the Trewartha climate classification system, Middle Smithfield Township has a Temperate Continental climate (Dc) with warm summers (b), cold winters (o) and year-around precipitation (Dcbo). Dcbo climates are characterized by at least one month having an average mean temperature ≤ 32.0 °F (0 °C), four to seven months with an average mean temperature ≥ 50.0 °F (10 °C), all months with an average mean temperature < 72.0 °F (22 °C) and no significant precipitation difference between seasons. Although most summer days are comfortably humid in Middle Smithfield Township, episodes of heat and high humidity can occur with heat index values > 97 °F (36 °C). Since 1981, the highest air temperature was 97.9 °F (37 °C) on July 22, 2011, and the highest daily average mean dew point was 71.6 °F (22 °C) on August 28, 2018. July is the peak month for thunderstorm activity, which correlates with the average warmest month of the year. The average wettest month is September, which correlates with tropical storm remnants during the peak of the Atlantic hurricane season. Since 1981, the wettest calendar day was 5.87 inches (149 mm) on October 8, 2005. During the winter months, the plant hardiness zone is 6a, with an average annual extreme minimum air temperature of −8.9 °F (−23 °C). Since 1981, the coldest air temperature was −21.2 °F (−30 °C) on January 21, 1994. Episodes of extreme cold and wind can occur with wind chill values < −21 °F (−29 °C). The average snowiest month is January, which correlates with the average coldest month of the year. Ice storms and large snowstorms depositing ≥ 12 inches (30 cm) of snow occur once every couple of years, particularly during nor’easters from December through March.

Climate data for Middle Smithfield Twp, Elevation 932 ft (284 m), 1981-2010 normals, extremes 1981-2018
Month	Jan	Feb	Mar	Apr	May	Jun	Jul	Aug	Sep	Oct	Nov	Dec	Year
Record high °F (°C)	66.4 (19.1)	75.0 (23.9)	84.6 (29.2)	92.0 (33.3)	93.3 (34.1)	93.2 (34.0)	97.9 (36.6)	96.4 (35.8)	94.7 (34.8)	86.4 (30.2)	77.5 (25.3)	69.6 (20.9)	97.9 (36.6)
Mean daily maximum °F (°C)	34.1 (1.2)	37.8 (3.2)	46.5 (8.1)	59.4 (15.2)	70.0 (21.1)	77.9 (25.5)	81.5 (27.5)	80.4 (26.9)	73.2 (22.9)	61.8 (16.6)	50.4 (10.2)	38.4 (3.6)	59.4 (15.2)
Daily mean °F (°C)	24.7 (−4.1)	27.8 (−2.3)	35.8 (2.1)	47.3 (8.5)	57.5 (14.2)	66.1 (18.9)	70.3 (21.3)	69.2 (20.7)	61.9 (16.6)	50.3 (10.2)	40.5 (4.7)	29.8 (−1.2)	48.5 (9.2)
Mean daily minimum °F (°C)	15.3 (−9.3)	17.7 (−7.9)	25.0 (−3.9)	35.1 (1.7)	44.9 (7.2)	54.4 (12.4)	59.0 (15.0)	57.9 (14.4)	50.5 (10.3)	38.7 (3.7)	30.7 (−0.7)	21.2 (−6.0)	37.6 (3.1)
Record low °F (°C)	−21.2 (−29.6)	−11.4 (−24.1)	−2.8 (−19.3)	12.6 (−10.8)	27.4 (−2.6)	34.7 (1.5)	40.9 (4.9)	36.6 (2.6)	29.3 (−1.5)	18.4 (−7.6)	2.7 (−16.3)	−9.8 (−23.2)	−21.2 (−29.6)
Average precipitation inches (mm)	3.35 (85)	2.93 (74)	3.65 (93)	4.10 (104)	4.36 (111)	4.58 (116)	4.28 (109)	4.31 (109)	4.80 (122)	4.59 (117)	3.83 (97)	3.89 (99)	48.67 (1,236)
Average snowfall inches (cm)	13.4 (34)	9.6 (24)	10.0 (25)	2.4 (6.1)	0.0 (0.0)	0.0 (0.0)	0.0 (0.0)	0.0 (0.0)	0.0 (0.0)	0.1 (0.25)	2.5 (6.4)	8.0 (20)	45.9 (117)
Average relative humidity (%)	70.9	65.1	61.1	57.4	60.9	69.7	69.6	72.3	73.4	70.6	69.8	72.1	67.7
Average dew point °F (°C)	16.6 (−8.6)	17.6 (−8.0)	23.7 (−4.6)	33.0 (0.6)	44.1 (6.7)	55.9 (13.3)	59.9 (15.5)	59.9 (15.5)	53.3 (11.8)	41.1 (5.1)	31.4 (−0.3)	21.9 (−5.6)	38.3 (3.5)
Source: PRISM

== Transportation ==
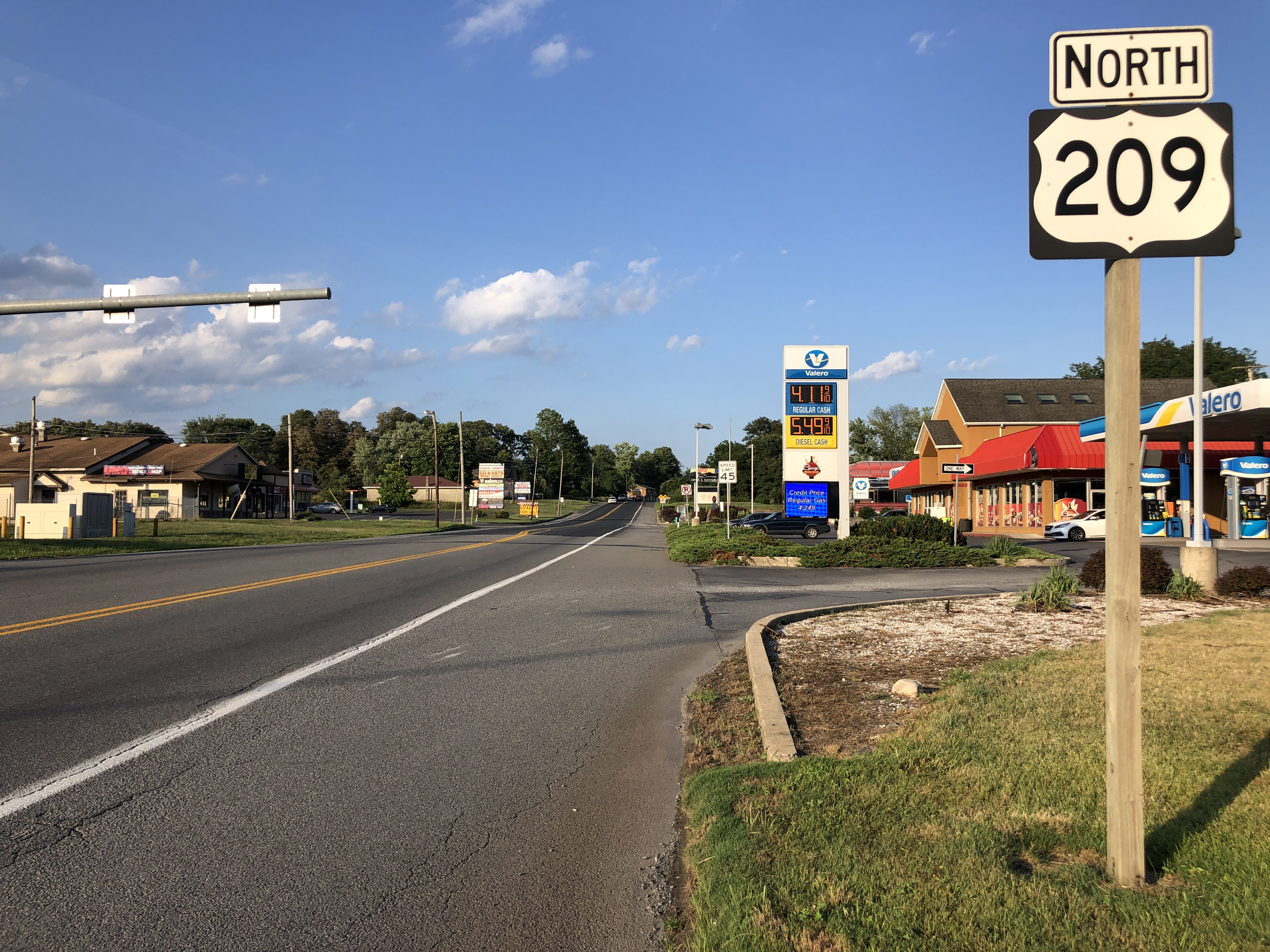
US Route 209 northbound in Middle Smithfield Township

As of 2020, there were 105.44 miles (169.69 km) of public roads in Middle Smithfield Township, of which 30.56 miles (49.18 km) were maintained by the Pennsylvania Department of Transportation (PennDOT) and 74.88 miles (120.51 km) were maintained by the township.

U.S. Route 209 and Pennsylvania Route 402 are the numbered highways serving Middle Smithfield Township. US 209 follows Milford Road along a southwest-northeast alignment across the southeastern portion of the township. PA 402 follows Resica Falls Road along a north-south alignment through the middle of the township.

== Ecology ==
According to the A. W. Kuchler U.S. potential natural vegetation types, Middle Smithfield Township would have a dominant vegetation type of Appalachian Oak (104) with a dominant vegetation form of Eastern Hardwood Forest (25). The peak spring bloom typically occurs in late-April and peak fall color usually occurs in mid-October. The plant hardiness zone is 6a with an average annual extreme minimum air temperature of −8.9 °F (−23 °C).
