= List of Pennsylvania state historical markers in Monroe County =

Location of Monroe County in Pennsylvania

This is a list of the Pennsylvania state historical markers in Monroe County.

This is intended to be a complete list of the official state historical markers placed in Monroe County, Pennsylvania by the Pennsylvania Historical and Museum Commission (PHMC). The locations of the historical markers, as well as the latitude and longitude coordinates as provided by the PHMC's database, are included below when available. There are 23 historical markers located in Monroe County.

== Historical markers ==
Marker title	Image	Date dedicated	Location	Marker type	Topics
A. Mitchell Palmer (1872-1936)		October 13, 2007	west entrance of courthouse at 7th & Monroe Sts., Stroudsburg; 40.9872°N 75.19498°W	City	Government & Politics 20th Century, Professions & Vocations
Colonel Jacob Stroud - PLAQUE		n/a	At cemetery entrance, across from 218 Main St. (Bus. 209), Stroudsburg; 40.98981°N 75.18782°W	Plaque	French & Indian War, Military, Native American, Religion
Daniel Brodhead		August 7, 1947	E. Brown St. at Pocono Med. Ctr., East Stroudsburg; 40.99242°N 75.17384°W	Roadside	Government & Politics, Government & Politics 18th Century
Dansbury Mission		June 15, 1947	Main St. (Bus. 209) near 2nd, across from #210, Stroudsburg; 40.99016°N 75.18764°W	Roadside	Early Settlement, Religion
Dutch Settlers		May 12, 2000	2028 River Rd. (LR 45012), 6.7 miles NE of Shawnee; 41.0647°N 75.01786°W	Roadside	Early Settlement, Ethnic & Immigration
Fort Hamilton		October 30, 1967	NW corner of 9th & Main Sts. (PA 611 & US 209), at Historical Assoc., Stroudsburg; 40.98441°N 75.19802°W	City	Forts, French & Indian War, Military
Fort Hamilton - PLAQUE		n/a	NW corner of 9th & Main Sts. (PA 611 & US 209), at Historical Assoc., Stroudsburg; 40.98441°N 75.19802°W	Plaque	Forts, French & Indian War, Military
Fort Hyndshaw		January 7, 1949	US 209 at Community Dr., SW of Bushkill; 41.08609°N 75.00764°W	Roadside	Forts, French & Indian War, Military
Fort Norris		August 2, 1947	US 209, .3 mi. N of PA 534, at elementary schl. entrance, Kresgeville; 40.90233°N 75.49069°W	Roadside	Forts, French & Indian War, Military
Fort Penn		May 25, 1967	530 Main St. (US 209) across from Stroudsburg U. M. Church, Stroudsburg; 40.9861°N 75.19122°W	City	Civil War, Forts, French & Indian War, Military
Jacob Stroud (1735-1806)		March 19, 1991	Municipal Bldg./Fire Station, 7th & Sarah Sts., Stroudsburg; 40.98719°N 75.19533°W	City	American Revolution, Government & Politics, Military
John Summerfield Staples (1845-1888)		April 9, 1999	Main St. at Dreher Ave., across from cemetery at #1060, Stroudsburg; 40.98304°N 75.20271°W	Roadside	Abraham Lincoln, Civil War, Government & Politics 19th Century, Military
Monroe County		January 22, 1983	7th & Monroe Sts. (Mattioli Circle), at courthouse, Stroudsburg; 40.9866°N 75.19476°W	City	Government & Politics, Government & Politics 19th Century, Native American
Nicholas Depuy		July 30, 1947	River Rd. (SR 2028), betw. Depuy Rd. & Shawnee Church Rd., .5 mile NE of Shawnee; 41.01338°N 75.10724°W	Roadside	Early Settlement, French & Indian War, Military
Nicholas Dupuy (1682-1762) - PLAQUE		n/a	River Rd. (SR 2028) & Hollow Rd. (SR 2023), Shawnee; 41.01214°N 75.11094°W	Plaque	Cities & Towns, Early Settlement, Ethnic & Immigration, Native American, Religion
Shawnee-Minisink Archaeological Site		July 2, 2010	River's Edge Park, River Rd., Minisink Hills	Roadside	Early Settlement, Native American
Smithfield Church		May 12, 2000	River Rd. (SR 2028), near Smithfield Beach Access, 3 miles NE of Shawnee; 41.02614°N 75.06427°W	Roadside	Religion
Sullivan Expedition Against the Iroquois Indians, 1779 (Brinker's Mill) - PLAQUE		1929	Route 209, ~6 miles SW of Stroudsburg at Sciota	Plaque	American Revolution, Military, Native American
Sullivan Expedition Against the Iroquois Indians, 1779 (Fort Penn)- PLAQUE		1929	inside historical assoc. at Main & 9th Sts., Stroudsburg	Plaque	American Revolution, Forts, Military, Native American
Sullivan Expedition Against the Iroquois Indians, 1779 (Learned's Tavern)- PLAQUE		1929	Rt. 611 at bridge at Old Mill Rd., Tannersville	Plaque	American Revolution, Military, Native American, Inns & Taverns
Sullivan Expedition Against the Iroquois Indians, 1779 (White Oak Run)- PLAQUE		n/a	Rt. 611 at Sullivan Trail Rd., across from dam and pond, 100 yds fr. E Crescent Lake Rd., 5 miles NE of Tannersville; 41.081°N 75.37367°W	Plaque	American Revolution, Military, Native American
Sullivan's March		August 2, 1947	Bus. US 209 just S of 209 split, Sciota; 41.0708°N 75.5225°W	Roadside	American Revolution, Military, Native American
Sullivan's March		August 2, 1947	Manor Dr. (PA 611) at Old Mill Rd. (CVS parking lot), Tannersville; 41.0399°N 75.30598°W	Roadside	Civil War, Military

== See also ==
- List of Pennsylvania state historical markers
- National Register of Historic Places listings in Monroe County, Pennsylvania
