= Delaware Water Gap, Pennsylvania =

Borough in Pennsylvania, US

- Borough
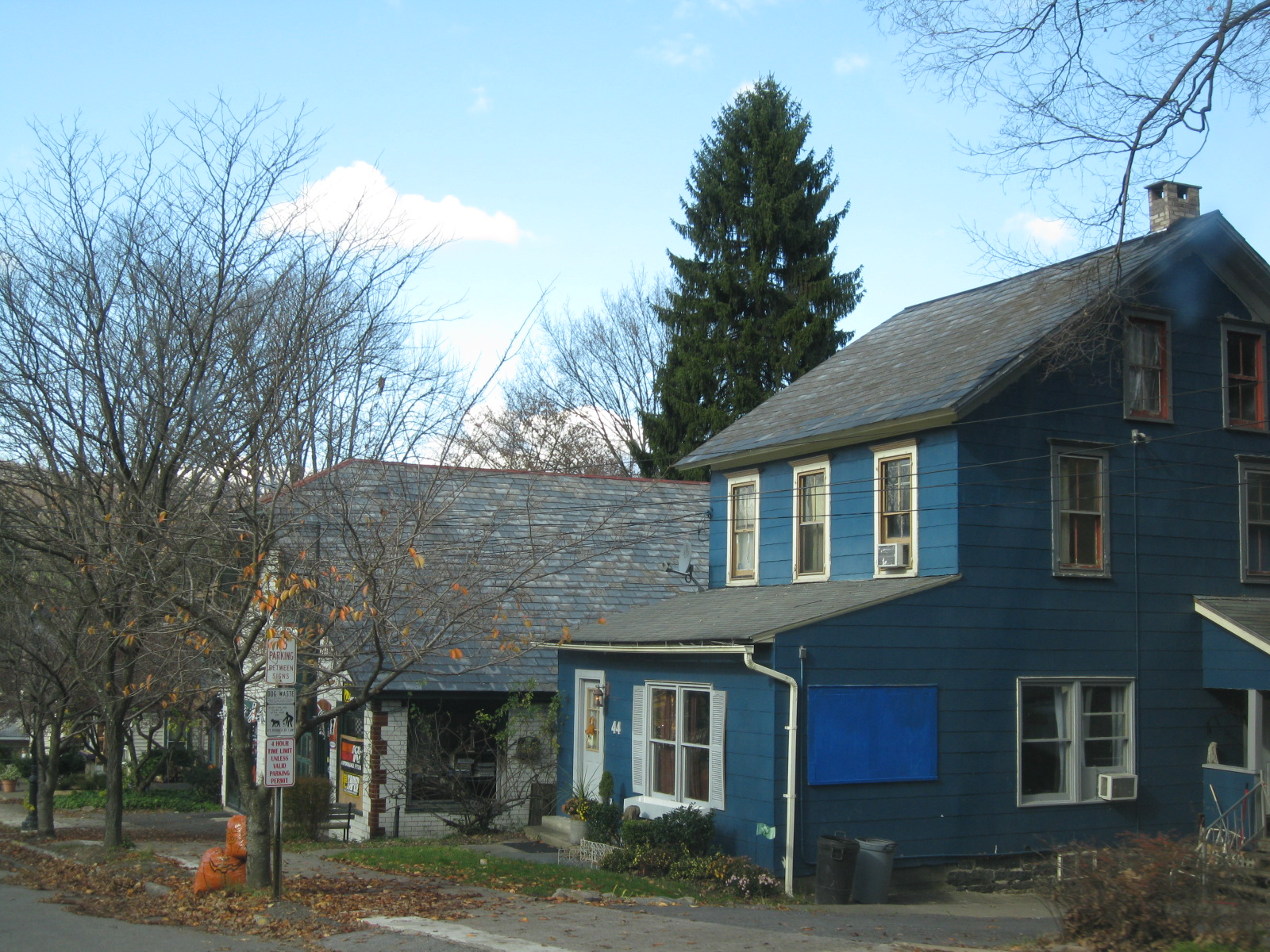
- Delaware Water Gap, Pennsylvania

- Location of Delaware Water Gap in Monroe County, Pennsylvania.

- Location of Delaware Water Gap in Pennsylvania Delaware Water Gap (the United States)
- Coordinates: 40°58′55″N 75°08′33″W
- Country: United States
- State: Pennsylvania
- County: Monroe

Area
  - Total: 2.07 sq mi (5.35 km^{2})
  - Land: 1.93 sq mi (5.00 km^{2})
  - Water: 0.14 sq mi (0.35 km^{2})
- Elevation: 400 ft (120 m)

Population (2020)
  - Total: 675
  - Density: 349.7/sq mi (135.02/km^{2})
- Time zone: UTC-5 (EST)
  - Summer (DST): UTC-4 (EDT)
- ZIP Code: 18327
- Area code: 570
- FIPS code: 42-18736
- Website: dwgpa.gov

Delaware Water Gap is a borough in Monroe County, Pennsylvania, United States. It is located adjacent to the Delaware Water Gap, the pass through which the Lackawanna Corridor and Interstate 80 run across the Pennsylvania-New Jersey border along the Delaware River.

The population of Delaware Water Gap was 675 at the 2020 census.

== History ==
The Delaware Water Gap station (Delaware, Lackawanna and Western Railroad) was added to the National Register of Historic Places in 2002.

== Geography ==
Delaware Water Gap is located at 40°58′55″N 75°8′33″W (40.982028, -75.142624).

According to the United States Census Bureau, the borough has a total area of 1.7 square miles (4.4 km^{2}), all land.

The Appalachian Trail runs through the town before continuing to New Jersey. Delaware Water Gap was designated as an Appalachian Trail Community in June 2014.

== Demographics ==
Historical population
Census	Pop.	Note	%±
1880	201		—
1890	467		132.3%
1900	469		0.4%
1910	446		−4.9%
1920	373		−16.4%
1930	443		18.8%
1940	410		−7.4%
1950	734		79.0%
1960	554		−24.5%
1970	533		−3.8%
1980	597		12.0%
1990	733		22.8%
2000	744		1.5%
2010	746		0.3%
2020	675		−9.5%
2021 (est.)	682	▲	1.0%
Sources: 2020

As of the 2010 United States census, there were 746 people living in the borough. The racial makeup of the borough was 81.4% White, 6.3% Black, 0.1% Native American, 3.9% Asian, 0.1% Pacific Islander and 0.9% from two or more races. 7.2% were Hispanic or Latino of any race.

As of the census of 2000, there were 744 people, 345 households, and 192 families living in the borough. The population density was 427.4 inhabitants per square mile (165.0/km^{2}). There were 362 housing units at an average density of 207.9 per square mile (80.3/km^{2}). The racial makeup of the borough was 92.61% White, 4.03% African American, 0.13% Native American, 1.21% Asian, 1.08% from other races, and 0.94% from two or more races. Hispanic or Latino of any race were 4.97% of the population.

There were 345 households, out of which 24.3% had children under the age of 18 living with them, 42.9% were married couples living together, 8.1% had a female householder with no husband present, and 44.1% were non-families. 31.9% of all households were made up of individuals, and 7.2% had someone living alone who was 65 years of age or older. The average household size was 2.16 and the average family size was 2.73.

In the borough the population was spread out, with 19.0% under the age of 18, 10.1% from 18 to 24, 36.2% from 25 to 44, 24.2% from 45 to 64, and 10.6% who were 65 years of age or older. The median age was 36 years. For every 100 females, there were 97.3 males. For every 100 females age 18 and over, there were 93.3 males.

The median income for a household in the borough was $37,708, and the median income for a family was $45,795. Males had a median income of $31,786 versus $26,083 for females. The per capita income for the borough was $21,641. About 8.1% of families and 8.8% of the population were below the poverty line, including 10.9% of those under age 18 and 3.4% of those age 65 or over.

United States presidential election results for Delaware Water Gap, Pennsylvania
Year	Republican		Democratic		Third party(ies)	
Year	No.	%	No.	%	No.	%
2024	153	39.13%	232	59.34%	6	1.53%
2020	159	40.25%	231	58.48%	5	1.27%
2016	151	40.59%	205	55.11%	16	4.30%
2012	131	39.10%	197	58.81%	7	2.09%
2008	116	31.87%	236	64.84%	12	3.30%
2004	150	39.37%	226	59.32%	5	1.31%
2000	120	40.40%	156	52.53%	21	7.07%

== Public education ==
The borough is served by the Stroudsburg Area School District.

== Transportation ==
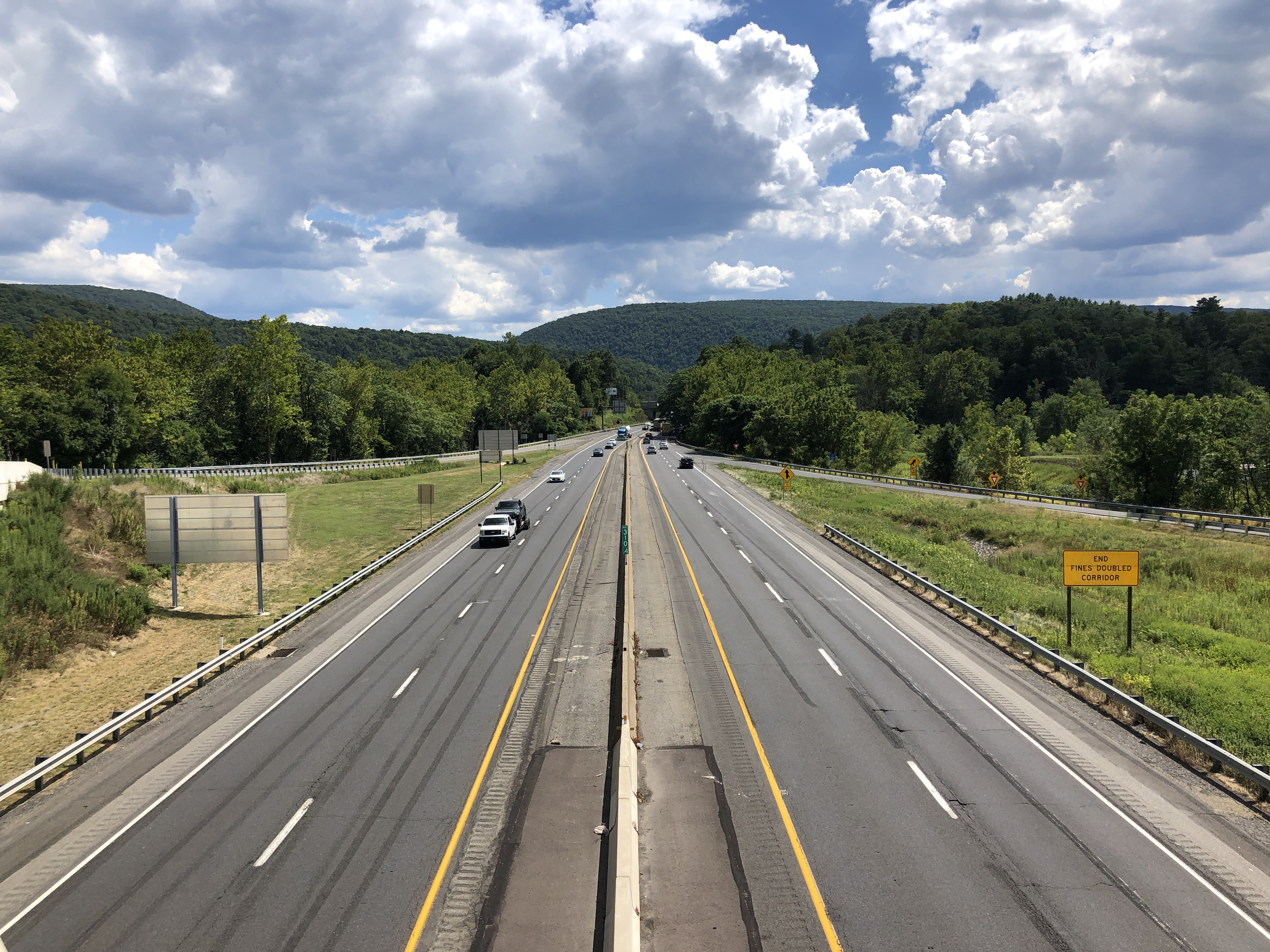
I-80 eastbound in Delaware Water Gap

As of 2018, there were 7.51 miles (12.09 km) of public roads in Delaware Water Gap, of which 3.96 miles (6.37 km) were maintained by the Pennsylvania Department of Transportation (PennDOT) and 3.55 miles (5.71 km) were maintained by the borough.

Interstate 80 is the main highway serving Delaware Water Gap. It follows the Keystone Shortway along a northwest–southeast alignment through the borough, crossing the Delaware River into New Jersey via the Delaware Water Gap Toll Bridge. Pennsylvania Route 611 also traverses the borough, following a northwest–southeast alignment via Foxtown Hill Road and Main Street.

== Happenings ==
- Each year in September, the Delaware Water Gap Celebration of the Arts Festival takes place. The festival showcases world-renowned jazz artists, sculptors, and painters who live in or around the town.

== Climate ==
According to the Köppen climate classification system, Delaware Water Gap has a Hot-summer Humid continental climate (Dfa).

Climate data for Delaware Water Gap (41.9736, -75.1391), elevation 564 ft (172 m), 1991-2020 normals, extremes 1981-2024
Month	Jan	Feb	Mar	Apr	May	Jun	Jul	Aug	Sep	Oct	Nov	Dec	Year
Record high °F (°C)	68.4 (20.2)	75.7 (24.3)	85.3 (29.6)	94.2 (34.6)	94.4 (34.7)	94.6 (34.8)	100.6 (38.1)	98.4 (36.9)	96.5 (35.8)	89.9 (32.2)	79.0 (26.1)	71.0 (21.7)	100.6 (38.1)
Mean daily maximum °F (°C)	36.2 (2.3)	39.2 (4.0)	47.6 (8.7)	60.8 (16.0)	71.1 (21.7)	79.2 (26.2)	83.9 (28.8)	82.1 (27.8)	75.5 (24.2)	63.4 (17.4)	51.9 (11.1)	41.3 (5.2)	61.1 (16.2)
Daily mean °F (°C)	27.5 (−2.5)	29.6 (−1.3)	37.4 (3.0)	49.1 (9.5)	59.4 (15.2)	68.0 (20.0)	72.9 (22.7)	71.0 (21.7)	64.1 (17.8)	52.4 (11.3)	41.8 (5.4)	32.9 (0.5)	50.6 (10.3)
Mean daily minimum °F (°C)	18.8 (−7.3)	19.9 (−6.7)	27.2 (−2.7)	37.4 (3.0)	47.8 (8.8)	56.9 (13.8)	61.8 (16.6)	59.9 (15.5)	52.7 (11.5)	41.3 (5.2)	31.6 (−0.2)	24.5 (−4.2)	40.1 (4.5)
Record low °F (°C)	−20.0 (−28.9)	−8.8 (−22.7)	−0.9 (−18.3)	14.0 (−10.0)	27.9 (−2.3)	36.9 (2.7)	43.1 (6.2)	38.1 (3.4)	29.7 (−1.3)	20.3 (−6.5)	6.0 (−14.4)	−7.0 (−21.7)	−20.0 (−28.9)
Average precipitation inches (mm)	3.71 (94)	3.01 (76)	3.95 (100)	4.23 (107)	4.35 (110)	4.91 (125)	4.82 (122)	4.82 (122)	5.21 (132)	5.35 (136)	3.69 (94)	4.54 (115)	52.58 (1,336)
Average snowfall inches (cm)	8.7 (22)	11.9 (30)	5.7 (14)	0.6 (1.5)	0.0 (0.0)	0.0 (0.0)	0.0 (0.0)	0.0 (0.0)	0.0 (0.0)	0.4 (1.0)	1.3 (3.3)	6.5 (17)	35.2 (89)
Average dew point °F (°C)	18.7 (−7.4)	18.8 (−7.3)	24.8 (−4.0)	33.9 (1.1)	46.6 (8.1)	57.4 (14.1)	62.0 (16.7)	61.2 (16.2)	55.0 (12.8)	43.3 (6.3)	31.7 (−0.2)	24.4 (−4.2)	39.9 (4.4)
Source 1: PRISM
Source 2: NOHRSC (Snow, 2008/2009 - 2024/2025 normals)

== Ecology ==
According to the A. W. Kuchler U.S. potential natural vegetation types, Delaware Water Gap would have a dominant vegetation type of Appalachian Oak (104) with a dominant vegetation form of Eastern Hardwood Forest (25). The peak spring bloom typically occurs in late-April and peak fall color usually occurs in mid-October. The plant hardiness zone is 6b with an average annual extreme minimum air temperature of −4.3 °F (−20 °C).

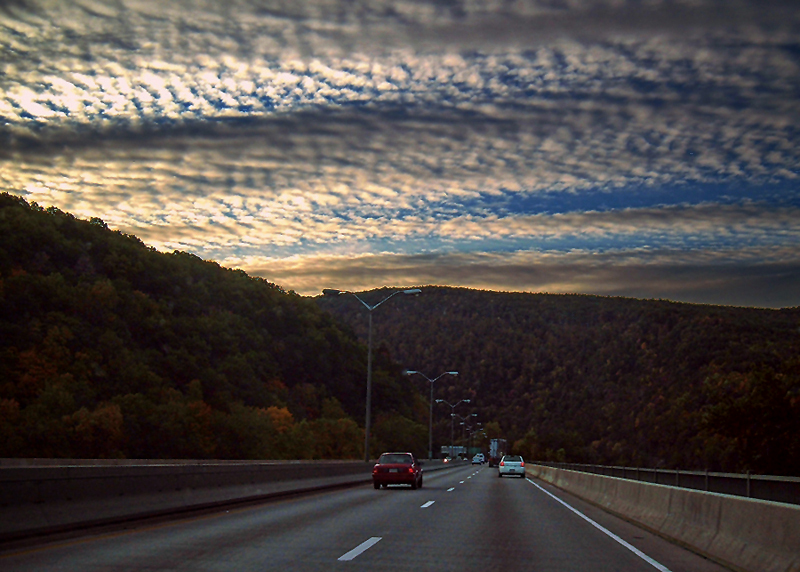
Delaware Water Gap, Pennsylvania

== See also ==
- Delaware Water Gap National Recreation Area
- Water gap
