= Trout Lake (Pennsylvania) =

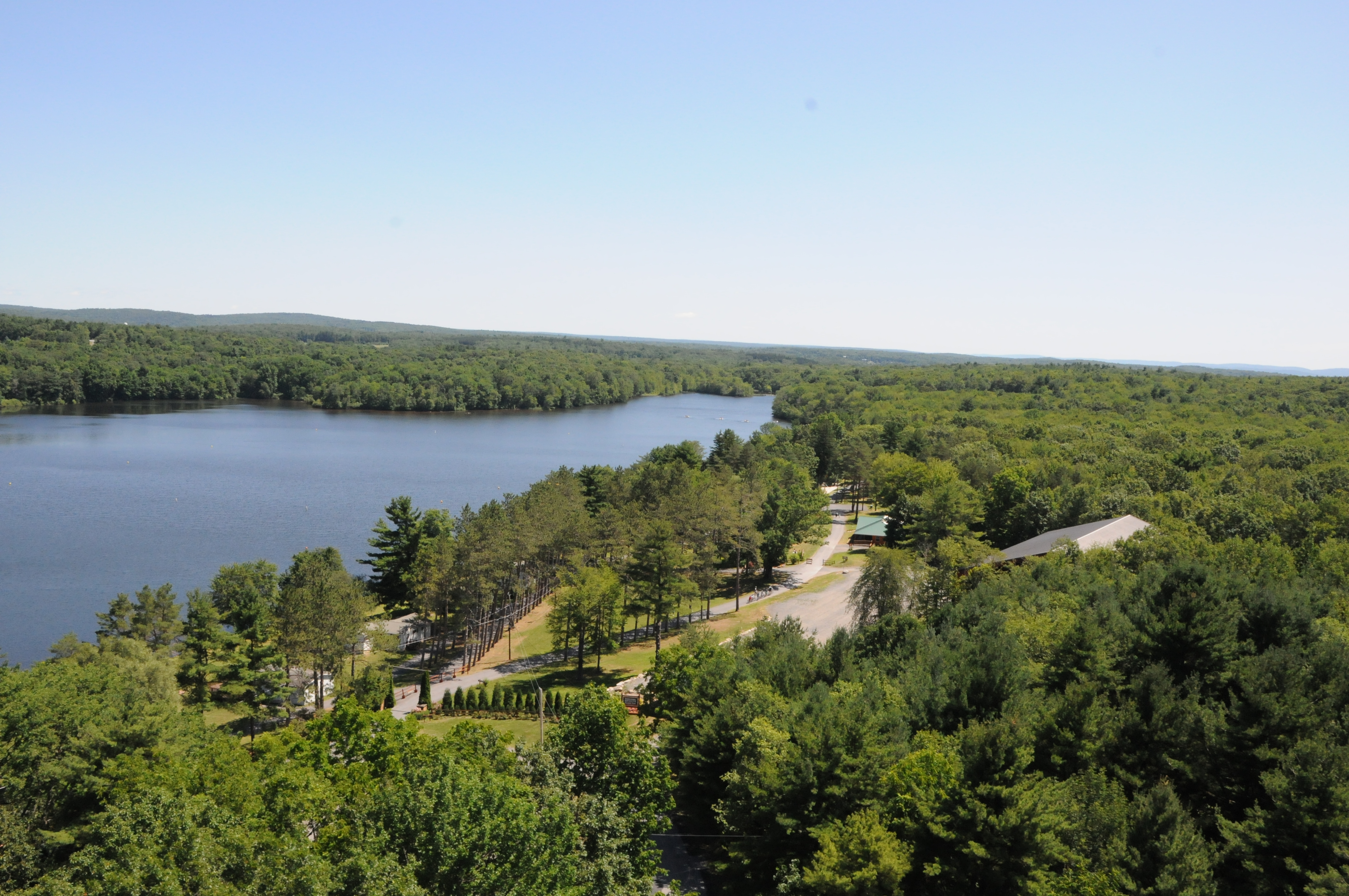
- Aerial view of Trout Lake

- Location within Pennsylvania
- Location: Monroe County, Pennsylvania
- Coordinates: 41°00′14″N 75°20′26″W
- Type: reservoir
- Basin countries: United States
- Average depth: 91 acres (37 ha)
- Surface elevation: 938 feet (286 m)

Trout Lake is a 89.7-acre (36.3 ha) reservoir in Monroe County, Pennsylvania, United States. The man-made lake is fed by the Appenzell Creek and is part of the McMichael Creek Subwatershed. The lake is at an elevation of 938 feet (286 m)

Trout Lake is located alongside Pennsylvania Route 715, 1.4 miles (2.3 km) South of Reeders in Jackson Township, Monroe County, Pennsylvania in the United States.

== History ==
Trout Lake was one of two major lakes in Jackson Township where ice was harvested, the other being Mountain Springs Lake. The lake was primarily used for farming and logging, until the late 1800s when the ice harvesting industry for refrigeration became popular. As the demand for ice grew, it was transported to neighboring cities including New York City and Philadelphia.

== Current usage ==
Since 1991, Trout Lake has operated as International Sports Training Camp and Trout Lake Retreats, both of which are owned and operated by Mark Major and Kara Klaus-Major.
