= Appenzell Creek =

Stream in Pennsylvania, USA

Coordinates: 40.956°N 75.288°W

Appenzell Creek is an 11.8-mile-long (19.0 km) tributary of McMichael Creek in Monroe County, Pennsylvania in the United States.

The headwaters feed into Trout Lake in Jackson Township in the Pocono Mountains. It meanders in a southwestern direction and joins McMichael Creek just above Sciota.

Known to locals as Pensyl Creek, it takes its name from Henry Pensyl, a hunter and trapper who lived in the area in the 18th century. Pensyl Creek Road follows the creek as it flows from the village of Neola to the village of Snydersville.

== See also ==
- List of rivers of Pennsylvania
