= Marie Zimmermann Farm =

Historic house in Pennsylvania, United States

- U.S. National Register of Historic Places
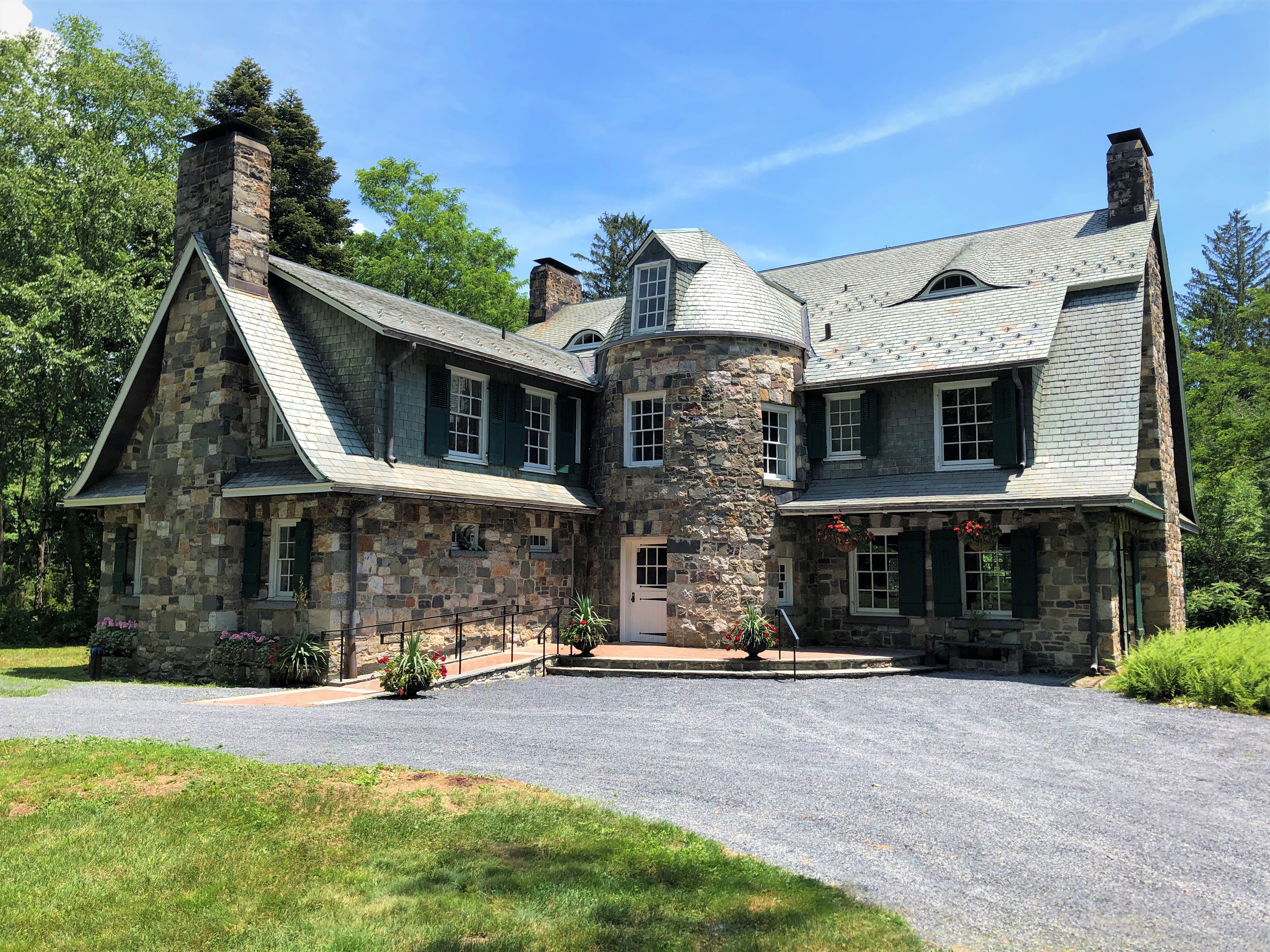
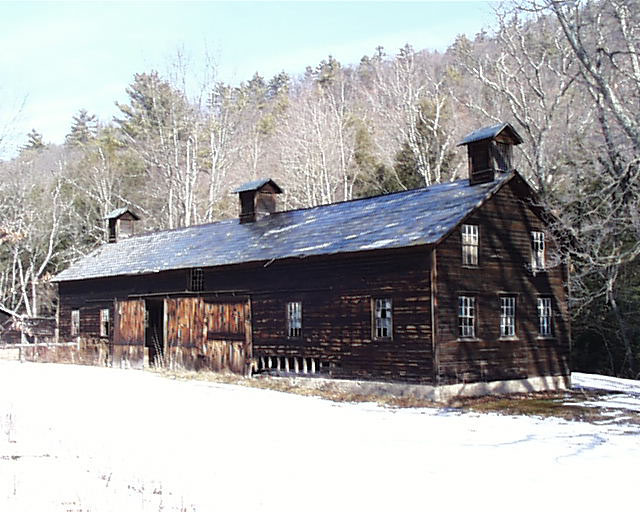
- The farm's main house A hog barn located on the property Logo

- Location within Pennsylvania Location within the United States
- Location: Southwest of Milford on U.S. Route 209, Delaware Township, Pennsylvania
- Coordinates: 41°15′7″N 74°51′30″W
- Area: 52 acres (21 ha)
- Built: c. 1910
- Architectural style: French Provincial
- Website: zimmermannfarm.com
- NRHP reference No.: 79000243
- Added to NRHP: November 1, 1979

The Marie Zimmermann Farm (Note: branded as Zimmermann Farm, addressed in post as The Farm) is an historic home that is located in the Delaware Water Gap National Recreation Area in Delaware Township, Pike County, Pennsylvania, United States.

It was added to the National Register of Historic Places in 1979.

== History and architectural features ==
Built circa 1910, this historic structure is a large 2 1/2-story, fieldstone dwelling with a gambrel roof with large dormers. It has a two-story, stone rear wing with a steep gable roof. The intersection of the main house and wing features a round, two-story tower, giving the house a French Provincial style. The house is set within a farm complex with two large frame barns, a smaller frame house, and associated outbuildings. It was the home of noted artist Marie Zimmermann (1879–1972).
