= Harriette Ashbrook =

American crime writer (1898–1946)

- Ashbrook, c. 1930
- Born: 1898; Manhattan, Kansas, US
- Died: 5 June 1946 (aged 47–48); Scottsbluff, Nebraska, U.S.
- Occupations: Author, novelist
- Writing career
- Language: English

Harriette Ashbrook (1898– 5 June 1946) was an American author of mystery and detective stories. She also wrote under the name Susannah Shane. She was born in Manhattan, Kansas, and went to Nebraska in the early 1900s.

== Personal life ==
Ashbrook went to school in Lincoln, Nebraska. She worked for newspapers in the US and Canada throughout her career. She moved from New York to Mitchell, Nebraska, in 1936 due to her illness. She died of heart disease at the age of 47 on June 5th 1946.

== Career ==
Ashbrook went to Vassar and Nebraska State University. After working on newspapers in Lincoln, Nebraska; Denver; Calgary; Alberta; and Brooklyn, she became a press agent for Coward-McCann, New York publishers.

Ashbrook praised Marie Zimmermann, an American designer, as a journalist for the Brooklyn Daily Eagle in 1926. Ashbrook, while working for Coward-McCann, wrote to Mahatma Gandhi on September 6, 1928, informing him that they were publishing Understanding India by Gertrude Marvin. Gandhi replied by writing that he would give an opinion on it once he had time. The Murder of Cecily Thane was published in the summer of 1930; in 1931, The Murder of Steven Kester was published. She also wrote Lady in a Million, Lady in a Wedding Dress, and The Baby in the Ash Can under the name Susannah Shane. She wrote the Spike Tracy detective novels from 1930 to 1941 under her own name and wrote six novels after 1941 to her death under her pseudonym.

She won the Dodd, Mead Red Badge detective story contest in 1941 for her 'Lady in Lilac', under the name Susannah Shane. She was featured on the Nebraska Centennial Literary map in 1967.

== Bibliography ==
=== Spike Tracy series ===
- The Murder of Cicely Thane (1930)
- The Murder of Stephen Kester (1931)
- The Murder of Sigurd Sharon (1933)
- A Most Immoral Murder (1935)
- Murder Makes Murder (1937)
- Murder Comes Back (1940)
- The Purple Onion Mystery (1941)

=== As Susannah Shane ===
- Lady in Lilac (1941)
- Lady in Danger (1942)
- Lady in a Wedding Dress (1943)
- Lady in a Million (1943)
- The Baby in the Ash Can (1944)
- Diamonds in the Dumplings (1946)
