= Schoonover Mountain House =

Historic house in Pennsylvania, United States

- U.S. National Register of Historic Places
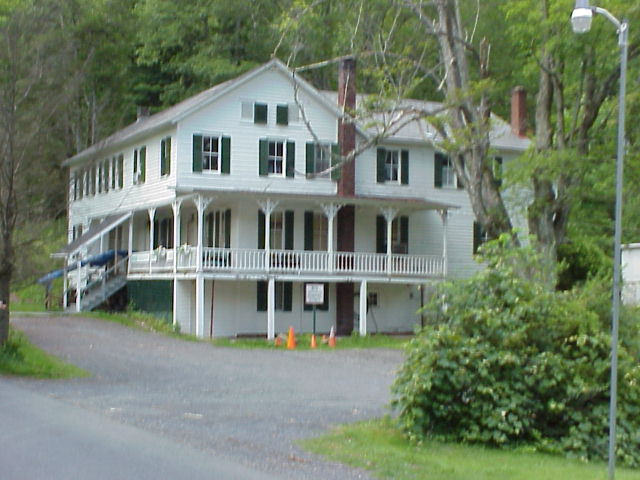
- Schoonover Mountain House

- Location within Pennsylvania Location within the United States
- Location: South of Bushkill, Middle Smithfield Township, Pennsylvania
- Coordinates: 41°4′44″N 75°0′48″W
- Area: 2.8 acres (1.1 ha)
- Built: c. 1850-1860
- NRHP reference No.: 79000245
- Added to NRHP: August 21, 1979

The Schoonover Mountain House, also known as the Schoonover Farm, is an historic home that is located in Delaware Water Gap National Recreation Area at Middle Smithfield Township, Monroe County, Pennsylvania, United States.

It was added to the National Register of Historic Places in 1979.

== History and architectural features ==
The original section of this historic house was built roughly between 1850 and 1860, and was enlarged at least three times by 1900. It is a large, rambling, two-story, L-shaped, frame banked dwelling. It is five bays wide, has a slate covered gable roof, and features a one-story wraparound porch.

It was owned by the locally prominent Schoonover family, and was operated during the late-nineteenth and early-twentieth centuries as a vacation and boarding house.
