= Cold Spring Farm Springhouse =

- U.S. National Register of Historic Places
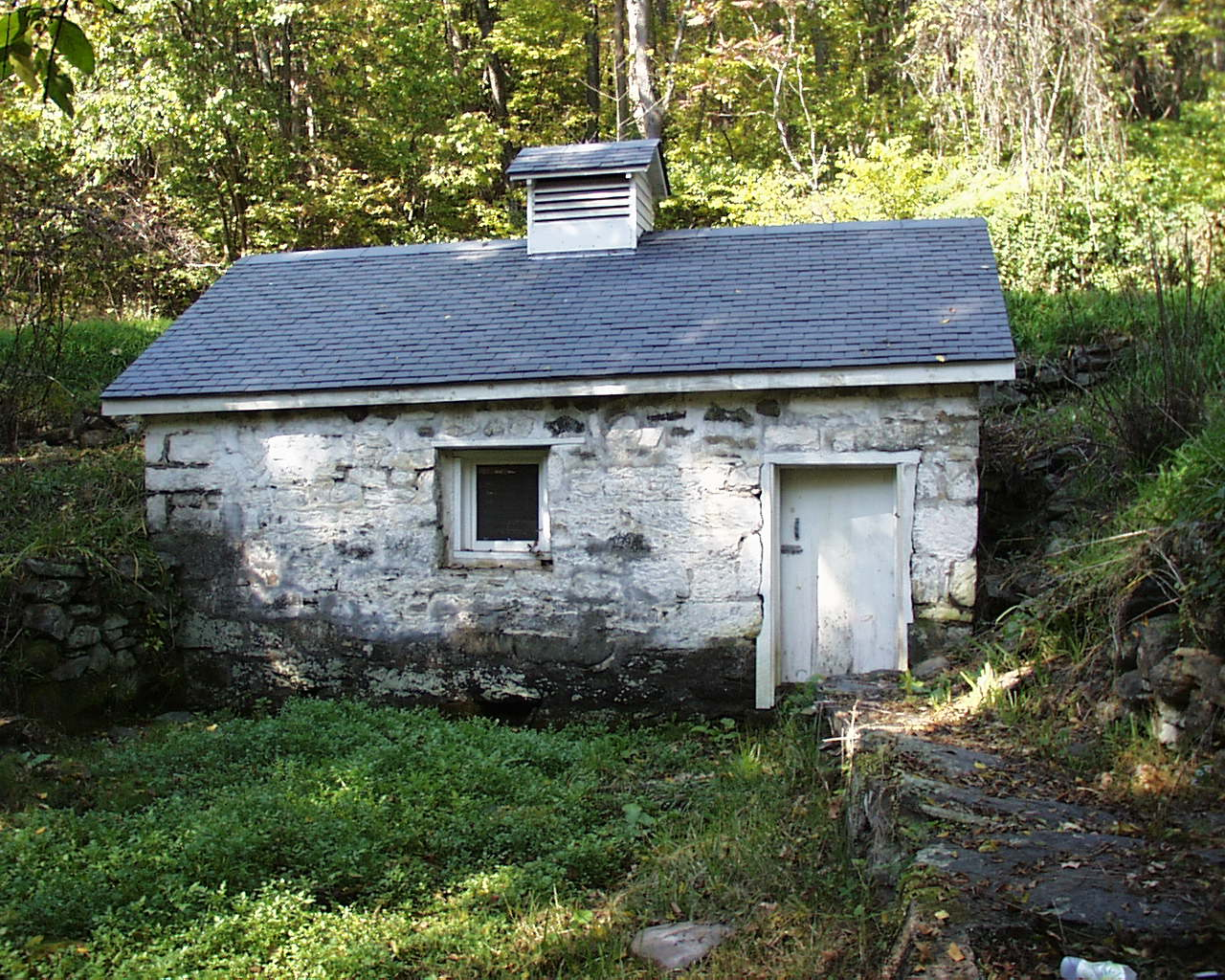
- Cold Spring Farm Springhouse

- Location within Pennsylvania Location within the United States
- Location: Northeast of East Stroudsburg, Middle Smithfield Township, Pennsylvania
- Coordinates: 41°3′44″N 75°1′9″W
- Area: 0.6 acres (0.24 ha)
- Built: 1909
- NRHP reference No.: 79000246
- Added to NRHP: August 24, 1979

Cold Spring Farm Springhouse is a historic springhouse located in Delaware Water Gap National Recreation Area at Middle Smithfield Township, Monroe County, Pennsylvania. It was built in the late-19th century and is a one-story, rectangular fieldstone building. It measures approximately 12 by 24 feet (3.7 by 7.3 m). It has a wood shingle roof and small cupola. Also on the property is a concrete dam, built about 1909. It represents a typical springhouse of the Delaware River Valley.

It was added to the National Register of Historic Places in 1979.
