= Capt. Jacob Shoemaker House =

Historic house in Pennsylvania, United States

- U.S. National Register of Historic Places
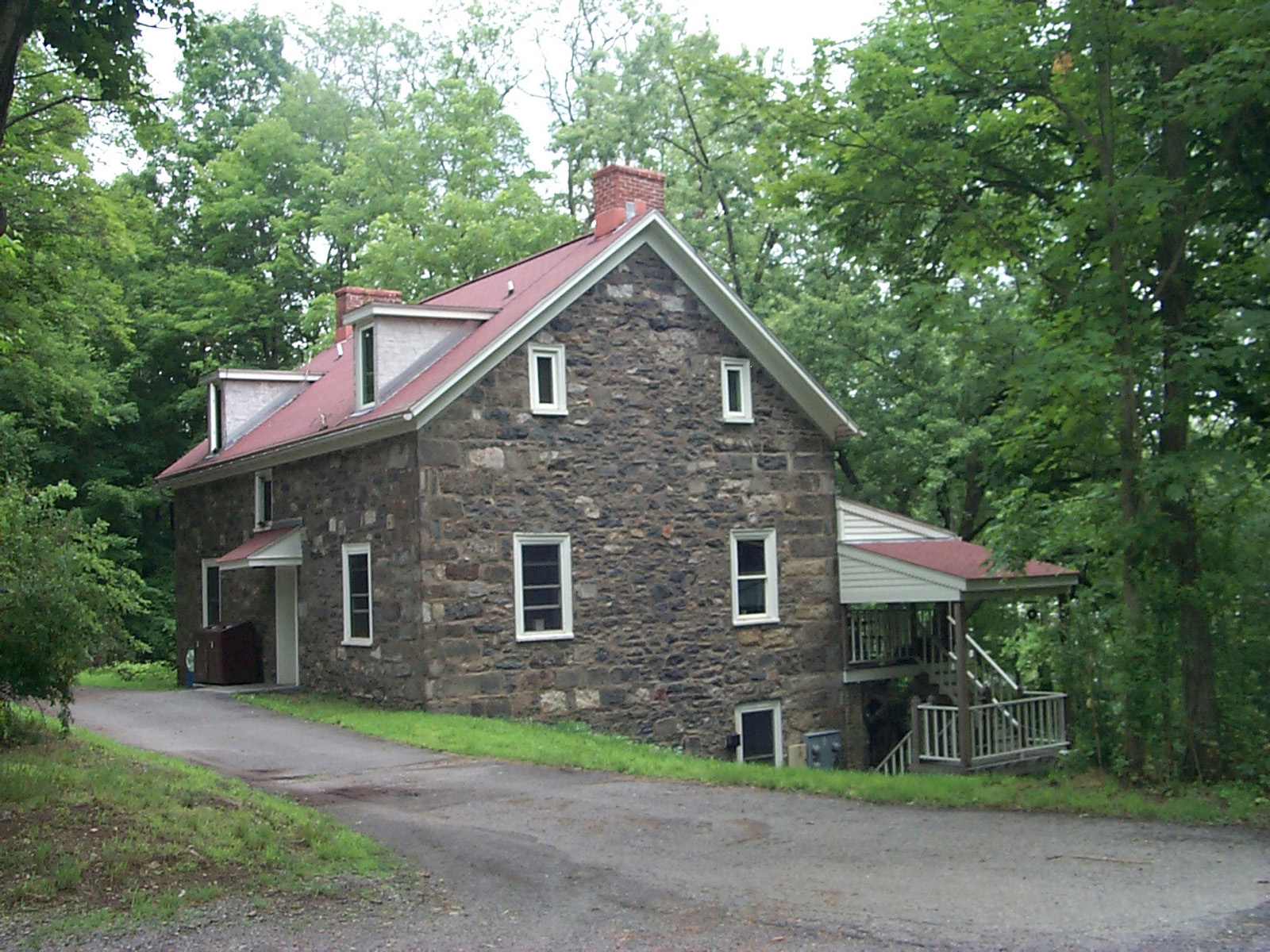
- Capt Jacob Shoemaker House, July 2007

- Location within Pennsylvania Location within the United States
- Location: Off Legislative Route 45012 south of Bushkill, Middle Smithfield Township, Pennsylvania
- Coordinates: 41°4′51″N 75°1′55″W
- Area: 1.8 acres (0.73 ha)
- Built: c. 1810
- NRHP reference No.: 79000247
- Added to NRHP: July 17, 1979

Capt. Jacob Shoemaker House is a historic home located in Delaware Water Gap National Recreation Area at Middle Smithfield Township, Monroe County, Pennsylvania. It was built about 1810, and is a 1 1/2-story, fieldstone dwelling over a banked stone basement. It has a gable roof with two dormers. The rear of the building has a two-story porch. It was the home of the locally prominent Shoemaker family.

It was added to the National Register of Historic Places in 1979.
