= John Michael Farm =

- U.S. National Register of Historic Places
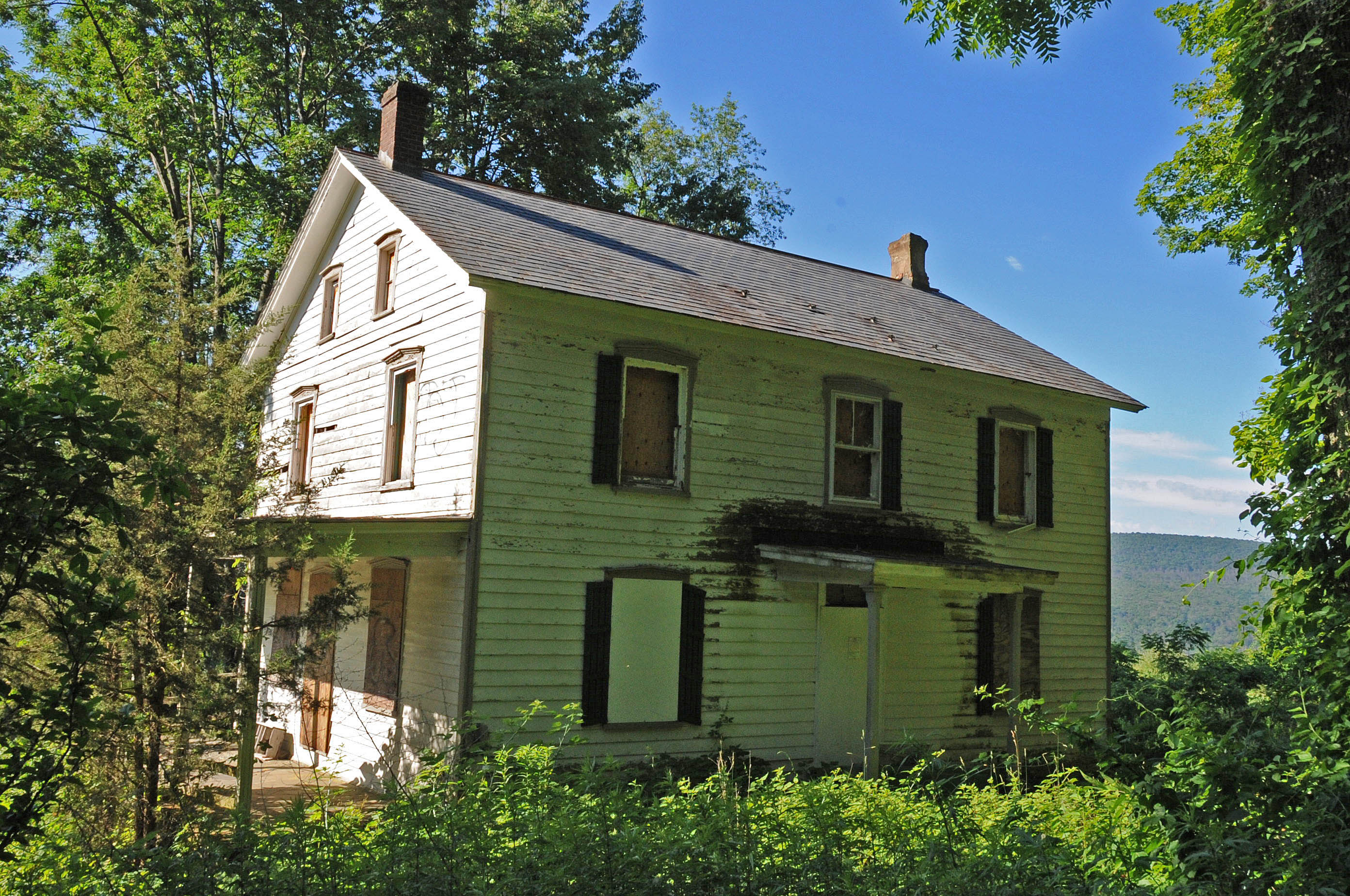

- Location within Pennsylvania Location within the United States
- Location: East of Stroudsburg, Middle Smithfield Township, Pennsylvania
- Coordinates: 41°2′6″N 75°3′25″W
- Area: 3.2 acres (1.3 ha)
- Built: c. 1875
- Architectural style: Late Victorian
- NRHP reference No.: 80000355
- Added to NRHP: July 8, 1980

The John Michael Farm is an historic farm complex that is located in the Delaware Water Gap National Recreation Area in Middle Smithfield Township, Monroe County, Pennsylvania, United States.

It was added to the National Register of Historic Places in 1980.

== History and architectural features ==
Built circa 1875, this historic structure is a two-story, frame building that sits on a fieldstone foundation. Designed in a Late Victorian style, it has a slate roof and stucco-coated, flared brick chimney. Also located on the property are a one-room wash house (c. 1875), a large frame Pennsylvania bank barn with a shed addition and silo, and a wagon shed.
