= John Turn Farm =

- U.S. National Register of Historic Places
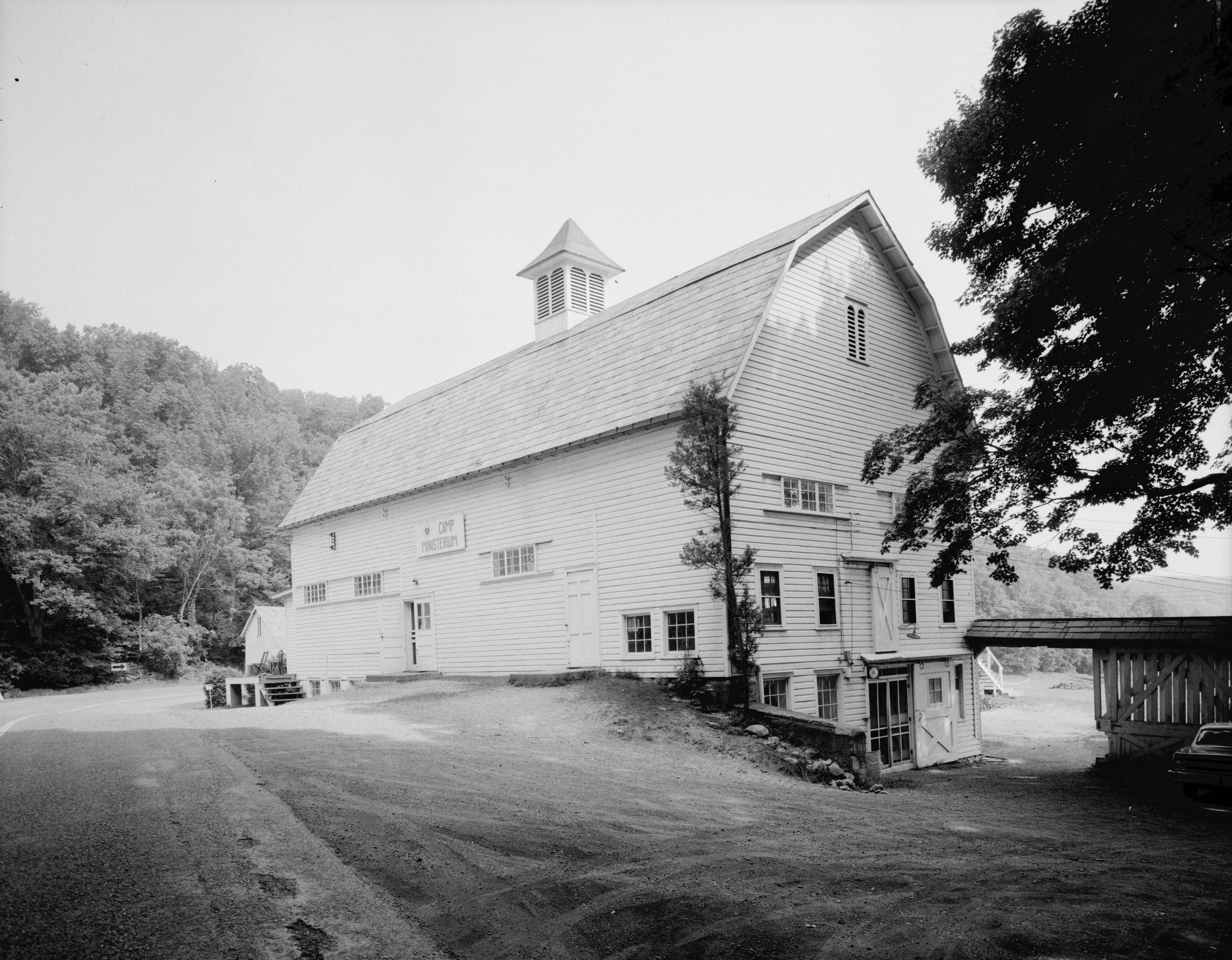
- John Turn Farm barn, HABS photo, 1970

- Location within Pennsylvania Location within the United States
- Location: Northeast of Stroudsburg, Middle Smithfield Township, Pennsylvania
- Coordinates: 41°3′30″N 75°1′25″W
- Area: 6 acres (2.4 ha)
- Built by: Turn, John, Sr.
- NRHP reference No.: 79000249
- Added to NRHP: July 23, 1979

John Turn Farm is a historic farm complex located in the Delaware Water Gap National Recreation Area at Middle Smithfield Township, Monroe County, Pennsylvania, USA. The complex includes the lime kiln, smoke house and weave house. The property also includes the site of the demolished main farmhouse, a smaller house, a barn and garage.

It was added to the National Register of Historic Places in 1979.
