= Zion Lutheran Church (East Stroudsburg, Pennsylvania) =

Historic church in Pennsylvania, United States

- U.S. National Register of Historic Places
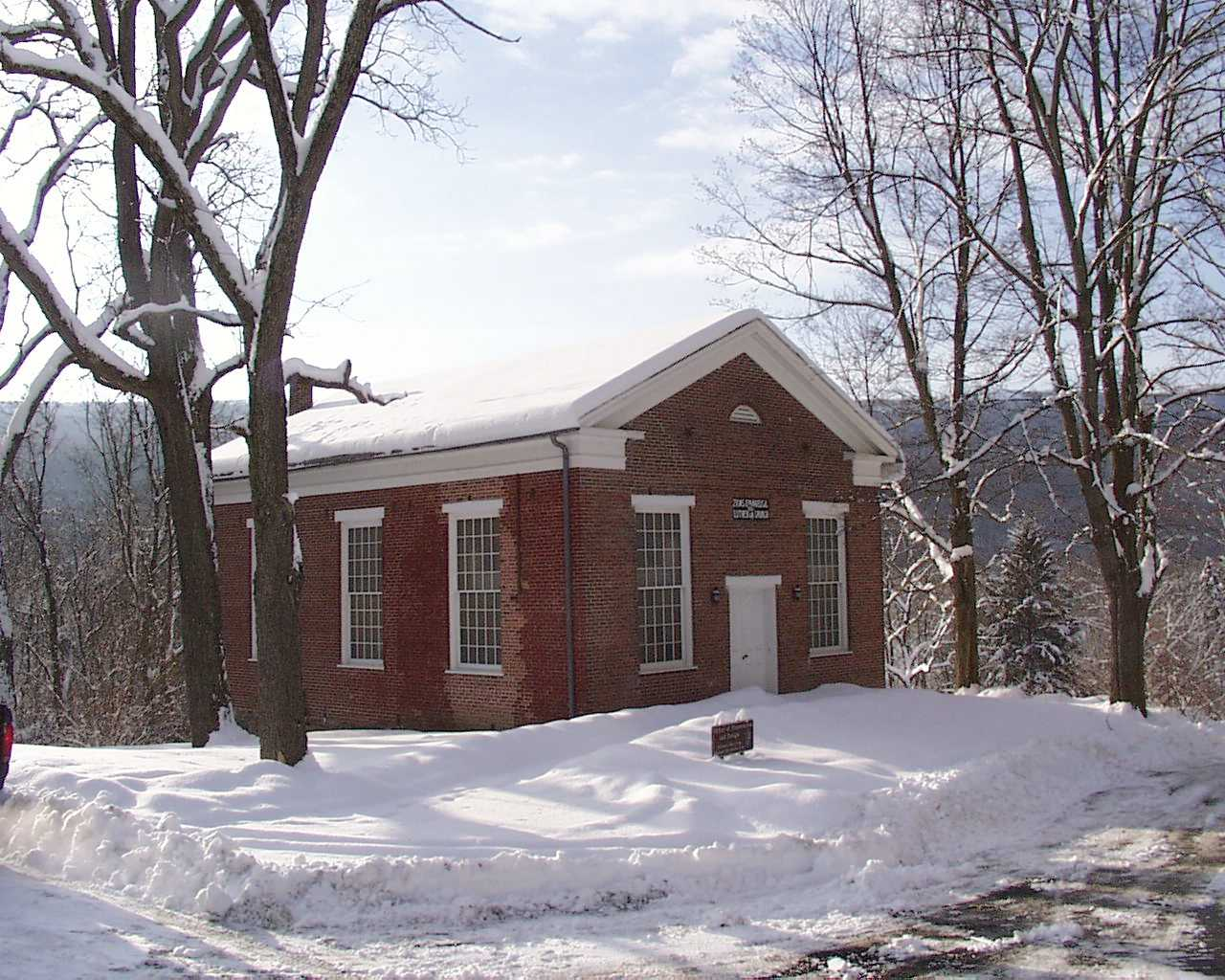
- Zion Lutheran Church

- Location within Pennsylvania Location within the United States
- Location: Off River Road east of East Stroudsburg, Middle Smithfield Township, Pennsylvania
- Coordinates: 41°2′26″N 75°2′19″W
- Area: 0.2 acres (0.081 ha)
- Built: 1851
- Architectural style: Greek Revival
- NRHP reference No.: 72000094
- Added to NRHP: November 9, 1972

Zion Lutheran Church, also known as The Lutheran Church of Middle Smithfield, is a historic Lutheran church located in Delaware Water Gap National Recreation Area at Middle Smithfield Township, Monroe County, Pennsylvania. It was built in 1851, and is a one-story, brick building in a modified Greek Revival style. It is built of brick made by members of the congregation and has a slate covered front gable roof.

It was added to the National Register of Historic Places in 1972.
