= Marie Zimmermann =

American designer and maker of jewelry and metalwork (1879–1972)

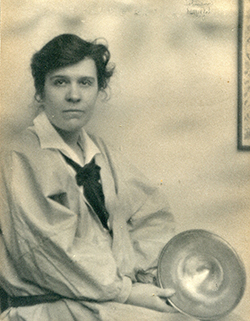
- Zimmermann in her studio in 1914
- Born: July 17, 1879; Brooklyn, New York City, US
- Died: June 17, 1972 (aged 92); Punta Gorda, Florida, US
- Education: Packer Collegiate Institute; Art Students League of New York; Pratt Institute
- Known for: Designer and maker of jewelry and metalwork

Marie Zimmermann (June 17, 1879 – June 17, 1972) was an American designer and maker of jewelry and metalwork. She is noted for fine craftsmanship and innovative design in a variety of different mediums and styles. Calling herself "a craftsman" rather than an artist, she employed a range of crafts in her work, including metalsmithing, carving, painting, and sculpting. A 1926 article in the Brooklyn Eagle by Harriette Ashbrook called her "perhaps the most versatile artist in the country".

== Early life and education ==
Zimmermann was born in Brooklyn, New York, in 1879, the fourth of five children to well-off Swiss immigrants John and Marie Zimmermann. Her family purchased a farm in 1882 along the Delaware River near Milford, Pennsylvania, to serve as a weekend and summer home. The family farm strongly influenced Zimmermann's creativity. Against her father's desire for her to go into medicine, she pursued a career in the decorative arts and worked toward mastery of metalworking. She was educated at the Packer Collegiate Institute, the Art Students League of New York, and the Pratt Institute.

== Career ==
Over 25 years, Zimmermann worked ten to twelve hours a day to master all of the different crafts she wanted to use in her art. The earliest record of her employed work is the annual arts and crafts exhibition at the Art Institute of Chicago from December 16, 1902, to January 10, 1903. By 1910, Zimmerman had commissions from around the country and opened her own studio in the National Arts Club in New York. She lived in New York and ran her studio at the National Arts Club from about 1910 to 1937. At the age of 33, she designed a large family vacation home in Pike County that shows the rustic elegance of the Arts and Crafts movement and is now a historic site.

Inspiring by Cellini and Michelangelo to master a wide range of media and techniques, Zimmermann designed metalwork in a wide range of media (gold, silver, bronze, copper, and iron), vessels, daggers and irons, light fixtures, stained-glass windows, garden gates, furniture, and jewelry. Much of her eclectic work was inspired by diverse historical precedents, including ancient Egyptian, Greco-Roman, and Chinese forms. She experimented freely with materials, surface, color, and applied ornament.

Many of Zimmermann's pieces were both useful and decorative—one example, a candlestick with an electric light in the back, combined elegance with utility. The electric light would provide enough illumination for people to see, and the candles would provide atmosphere. Zimmermann used many of her own pieces in her own home and therefore knew the work from the client/user's perspective as well as the maker/designer's. She hired and trained six assistants to help execute her designs.

== Later life ==
Zimmermann closed her studio at the National Arts Club in 1937 and retired in 1940. Her whole family had died during a span of five years. The government was also urging her to do better bookkeeping, especially regarding the valuable materials she was using. She eventually left New York City to settle on the family farm.

Zimmermann was an avid fisher and hunter, and lived for over forty years with her life partner Ruth Allen (1884–1969), a former actress and screenwriter.

In 1969, Zimmermann moved to Punta Gorda, Florida. She died in Florida on her 93rd birthday in 1972. Her ashes were scattered on the family farm.

== Style ==
Zimmermann created in many different styles, and her work spanned multiple artistic movements. Her works were created within the diverse movements that were common in the United States during her lifetime. Her life in central New York exposed Zimmermann to the latest stylistic influences and her artistic curiosity. Examples of the Belle Époque, the Aesthetic Movement, the Arts and Crafts Movement, Greek and Egyptian Revival, Art Deco, and Modernism can be found in her works. To draw inspiration from around the world, she built an extensive personal library.

== Awards ==
Zimmermann won the Logan Prize for Jewelry and Silverware from an exhibition at the Art Institute of Chicago in 1924.

== Legacy ==
After her retirement, Zimmermann lost some of her public recognition. In the 1980s, her nephew decided to continue her legacy by placing her art in various museums.

Works by Marie Zimmermann were collected by the Columbus Museum (the Persian Box, in silver and ivory with applied lapis lazuli, pearls, jade and malachite), the Art Institute of Chicago, Carnegie Museum of Art, Los Angeles County Museum of Art, Metropolitan Museum of Art, Minneapolis Institute of Art, Museum of Fine Arts in Boston and Wolfsonian-FIU. Her papers are held at the Winterthur Museum, Garden and Library.

The Marie Zimmermann Farm was added to the National Register of Historic Places in 1979.
