= Delaware Water Gap National Recreation Area =

Protected area

- Middle Delaware National Scenic River
- Seal

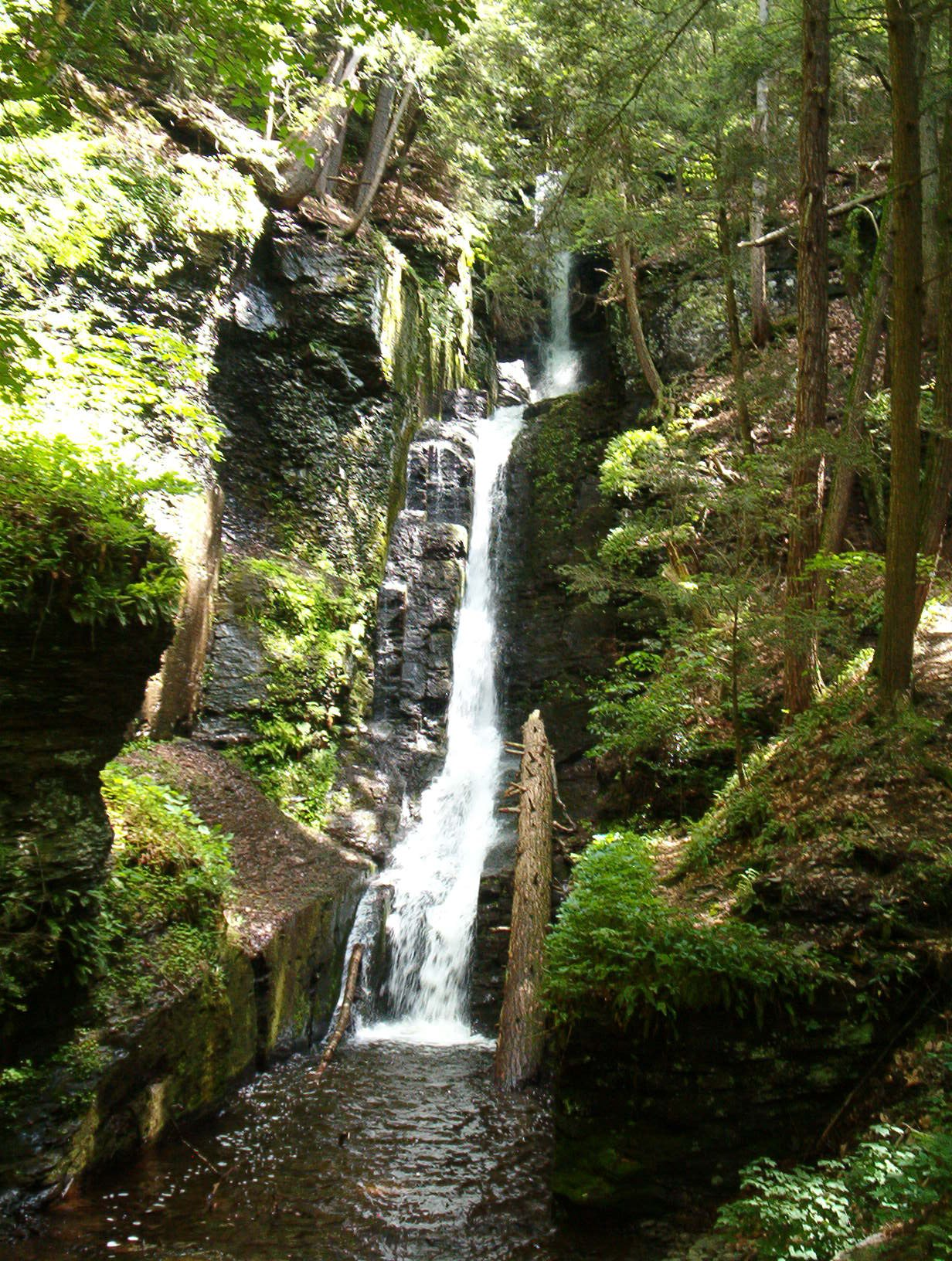
- Silver Thread Falls, the smaller waterfall at Dingman's Falls site, near Dingman's Ferry, Pennsylvania, June 2006

- Location within the United States Location within New Jersey Location within Pennsylvania
- Interactive map of Delaware Water Gap National Recreation Area
- Location: New Jersey and Pennsylvania, U.S.
- Nearest city: Stroudsburg, Pennsylvania, Port Jervis, New York
- Coordinates: 41°09′14″N 74°54′50″W
- Area: 66,741 acres (270.09 km^{2})
- Established: September 1, 1965
- Visitors: 4,207,541 (in 2023)
- Governing body: National Park Service
- Website: Delaware Water Gap National Recreation Area

The Delaware Water Gap National Recreation Area (DEWA) is a 70,000-acre (28,000 ha) national recreation area administered by the National Park Service in northwest New Jersey and northeast Pennsylvania. It is centered around a 40-mile (64 km) stretch of the Delaware River designated the Middle Delaware National Scenic River. At the area's southern end lies the Delaware Water Gap, a dramatic mountain pass where the river cuts between Blue Mountain and Kittatinny Mountain.

More than 4 million people visit the recreation area annually, many from the nearby New York metropolitan area, making it one of the most visited national park areas in the nation. Canoeing, kayaking, and rafting trips down the river are popular in the summer. Other activities include hiking, rock climbing, swimming, fishing, hunting, camping, cycling, cross-country skiing, and horseback riding. Worthington State Forest and a section of the long-distance Appalachian Trail are located within the area, alongside numerous waterfalls and historic sites.

The region, known historically as the Minisink, was inhabited by the Munsee at the time of Dutch and French Huguenot colonization in the late 17th century. The national recreation area was established in 1965 ahead of a dam project which would have flooded a large region north of the Water Gap. Over 15,000 people were displaced as the U.S. Army Corps of Engineers acquired land for the reservoir. The controversial project was ultimately canceled in 1978 and the land transferred to the recreation area.

There are efforts as of 2022 to re-designate the area as a national park, the first in New Jersey or Pennsylvania.

== Description ==
The recreation area includes parts of Sussex and Warren counties in New Jersey, and Monroe, Northampton, and Pike counties in Pennsylvania. The Appalachian Trail runs along much of the eastern boundary of the park and is maintained and updated by the New York–New Jersey Trail Conference.

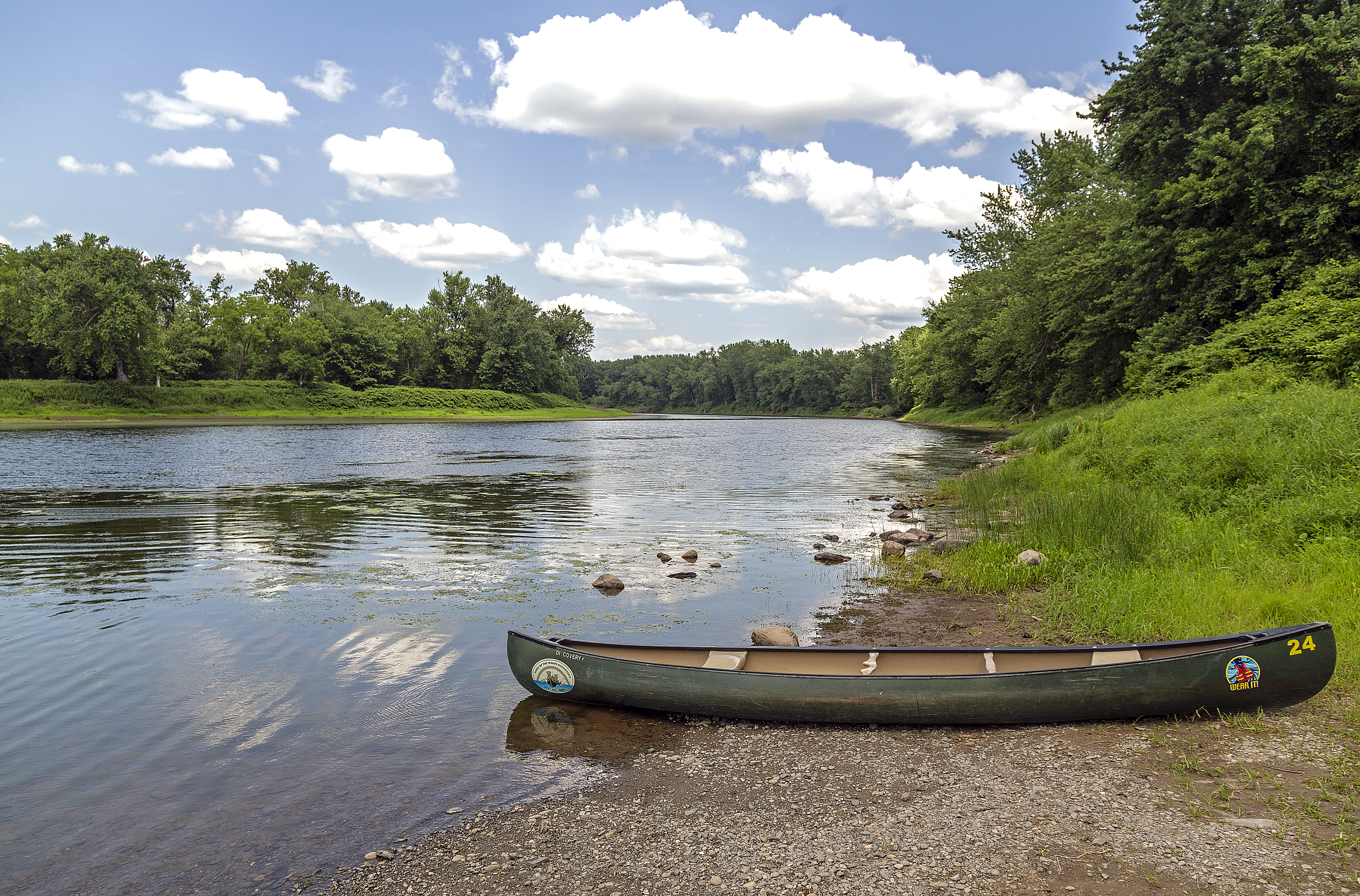
Canoe at Poxono Access

The park offers historical and cultural sites including the Minisink Archaeological Site, Millbrook Village, and the arts center in Peters Valley and rural scenery approximately an hour's drive from New York City. The park has significant Native American archaeological sites. In addition, a number of structures remain from early Dutch settlement during the colonial period. Outdoor recreational activities include canoeing, hiking, camping, swimming, cycling, cross-country skiing, horseback riding, and picnicking. Fishing and hunting are permitted in season with valid state licenses.

The NPS maintains six boating access points, including a place that is the ghost town of Eshbach, Pennsylvania.

The area is also noted for its many waterfalls. These include Buttermilk Falls, the tallest falls in New Jersey at about 90 feet (27 m), and Raymondskill Falls, the tallest in Pennsylvania at about 150 feet (46 m).

== Geology and geography ==
=== Delaware Water Gap ===
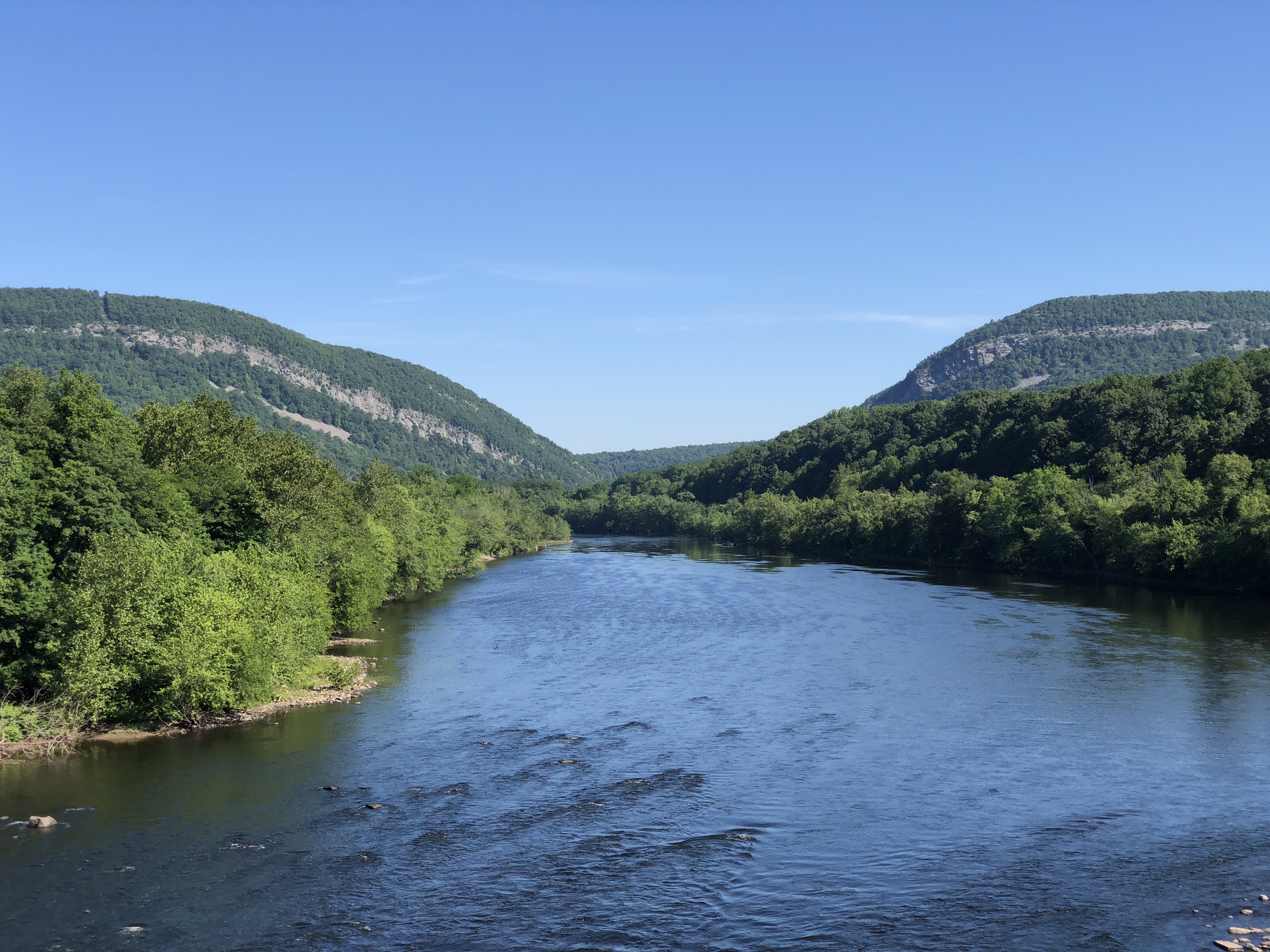
The Delaware Water Gap as seen from the Delaware River Viaduct

The namesake feature of the recreation area is the prominent Delaware Water Gap, located at the area's southern end. The Delaware River runs through the gap, separating Pennsylvania's Mount Minsi on Blue Mountain, elevation 1,461 feet (445 m), from New Jersey's Mount Tammany on Kittatinny Mountain, elevation 1,527 feet (465 m). The gap is less than 1,000 feet (300 m) wide at river level and less than 1 mile (1.6 km) wide at the ridge line. The river is about 350 feet (110 m) wide at the gap.

The gap has long facilitated transportation across the ridge, with Pennsylvania building the first road through the gap in 1793. Today, I-80 occupies the eastern side of the gap, while PA 611 and the Pocono Mainline of the Delaware-Lackawanna Railroad runs through the western side.

=== Minisink ===
The Delaware Water Gap National Recreation Area incorporates much of the historical Minisink. The Minisink (or more recently "Minisink Valley") is a loosely defined geographic region of the Upper Delaware River valley in northwestern New Jersey (Sussex and Warren counties), northeastern Pennsylvania (Pike and Monroe counties) and New York (Orange and Sullivan counties). The name was derived by Dutch colonists from the Munsee name for the area. While the term "Minisink" is not used often today, it is preserved because of its historical significance in the early European settlement of the region during the American colonial period and as an artifact of the early "first contact" between Native Americans and early European explorers, traders and missionaries in the seventeenth century.

== History ==
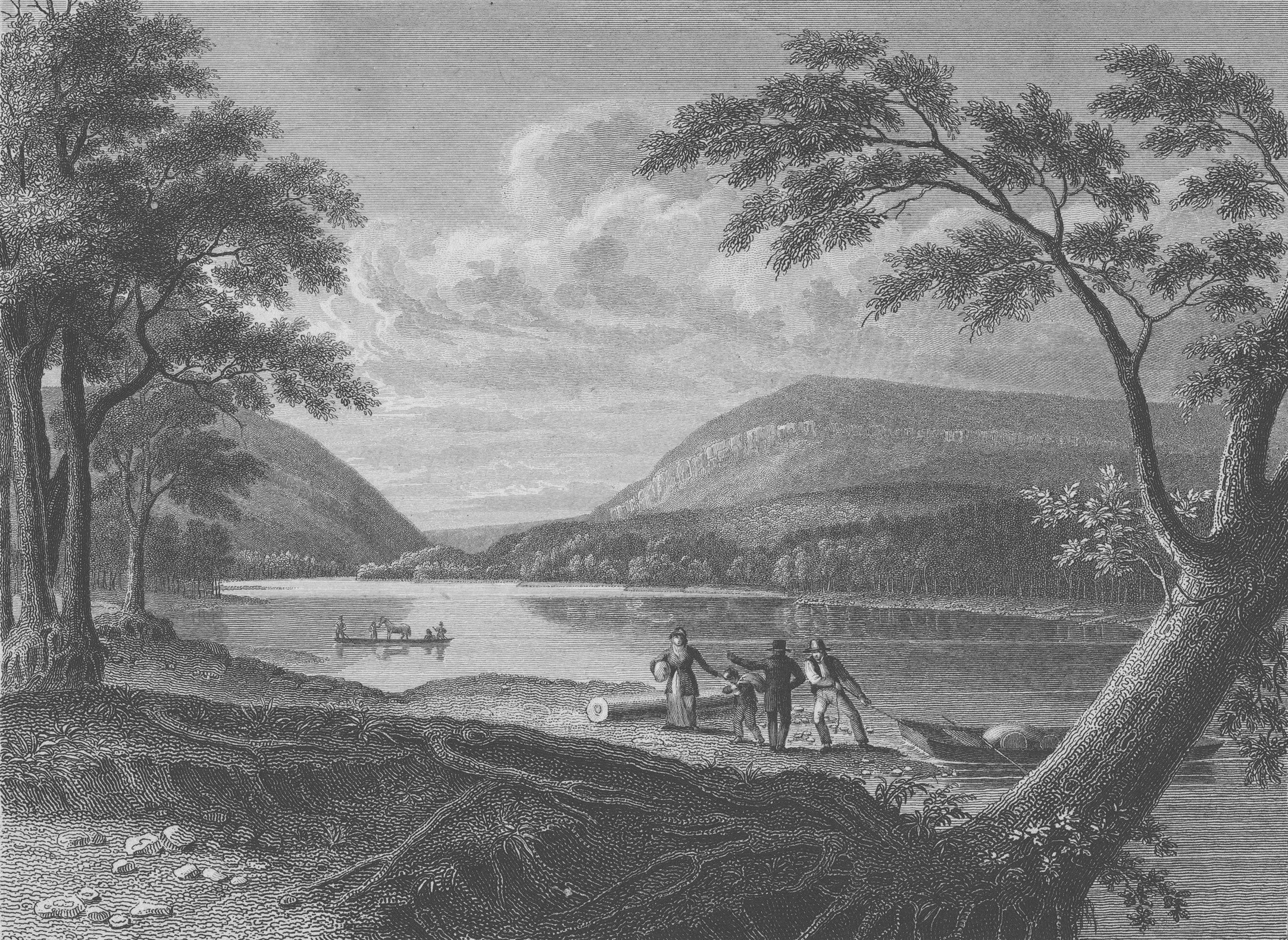
The Water Gap depicted in 1830

At the time of European contact, the Minisink was inhabited by Munsee, the northern branch of the Lenape. The area's first European settlers arrived in the late seventeenth and early eighteenth centuries and were Dutch and French Huguenot families from colonial New York's Hudson River Valley.

=== Tocks Island Dam project ===
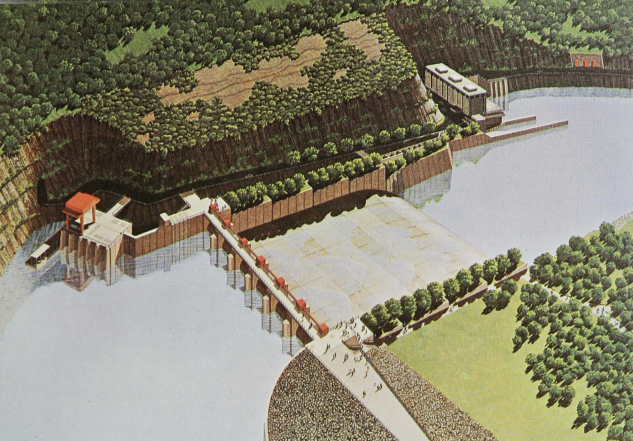
Rendering of Tocks Island Dam

The Delaware River is prone to floods—some resulting from seasonal snow melt or rain run-off from heavy rainstorms. However, record flooding occurred in August 1955 in the aftermath of two separate hurricanes (Hurricane Connie and Hurricane Diane) that passed over the area within the span of one week. On 19 August 1955, the river gauge at Riegelsville, Pennsylvania recorded that the Delaware River reached a crest of 38.85 feet, or 16.85 feet above flood stage.

A project to dam the river near Tocks Island was in the works before the 1955 floods. But several deaths and severe damages resulting from these floods brought the issue of flood control to the national level. The U.S. Army Corps of Engineers proposed the construction of the dam, which would have created a 37-mile (60-km) long lake between Pennsylvania and New Jersey, with depths of up to 140 feet. The area around the lake would be established as the Tocks Island National Recreation Area under the oversight of the National Park Service, to offer recreation activities such as hunting, hiking, fishing, and boating. In addition to flood control and recreation, the dam would be used to generate hydroelectric power and provide a clean water supply to New York City and Philadelphia.

Starting in 1960, the present-day area of the Recreation Area was acquired for the Army Corps of Engineers through eminent domain. Approximately 15,000 people were displaced by the condemnation of property along the Delaware River and the surrounding area. An estimated 3,000 to 5,000 dwellings and outbuildings were demolished in preparation for the dam project and subsequent flooding of the valley. This included many irreplaceable historical sites and structures connected with the valley's Native American and colonial heritage.

=== Establishment of the recreation area ===
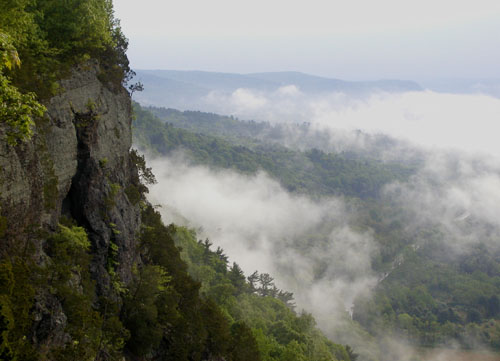
Fog surrounds cliffs looming over the Delaware River whose valley is the core of the historic Minisink region, July 2007

In support of the Tocks Island Dam project, Congress authorized the Delaware Water Gap National Recreation Area in 1965. The area was intended to encompass a narrow strip of shoreline surrounding the reservoir, in part to make the project more cost-effective.

The dam project was embroiled in controversy, engendering strong opposition from environmental groups and embittered, displaced residents. Due to this opposition, the unavailability of funding for the dam, and a geological assessment revealing the dam would be located near active fault lines, the federal government ultimately decided to abandon the project in 1978. The lands acquired were then transferred to the National Park Service and added to the Delaware Water Gap National Recreation Area.

=== Recent history ===
The recreation area is currently facing major under-funding. Deferred maintenance costs total over $161 million, with an annual $6 million routine maintenance cost.

In November 2021, a proposal was introduced to redesignate the recreational area as a full-fledged national park, which would make it the first such park in Pennsylvania or New Jersey. Local Sierra Club chapters have supported this proposal, claiming it would help to improve the Recreation Area's infrastructure and capacity for tourists.

== Superintendents and regional affiliations ==
Previous and current superintendents of the Delaware Water Gap National Recreation Area include:

- Peter DeGelleke, 1965–1973
- James McLaughlin, 1973–1979
- Albert "Amos" Hawkins, 1979–1988
- Richard Ring, 1988–1992
- Roger Rector, 1992–1997
- William Laitner, 1997–2003
- John Donahue, 2003–2017
- Sula Jacobs, 2018–2022
- Doyle Sapp, 2022–2025
- Eamon Leighty, 2026–present

The park is currently a part of Interior Region 1 of the National Park Service. It was originally a part of the Northeast region, and later the North Atlantic-Appalachian Region.

== Gallery ==
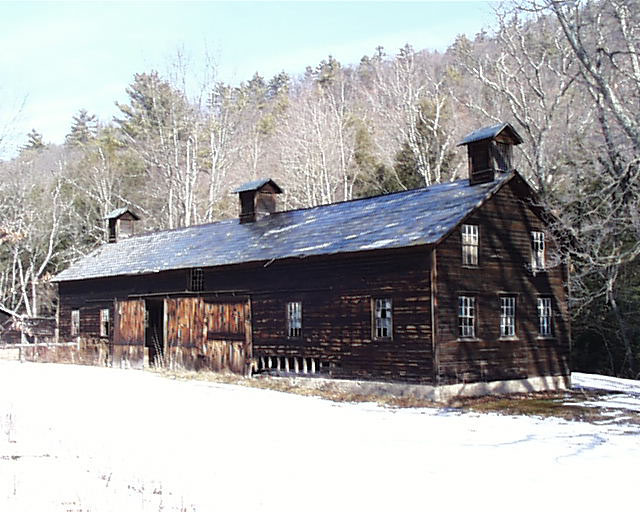
The Hog Barn at the Pennsylvania farm of artist Marie Zimmermann

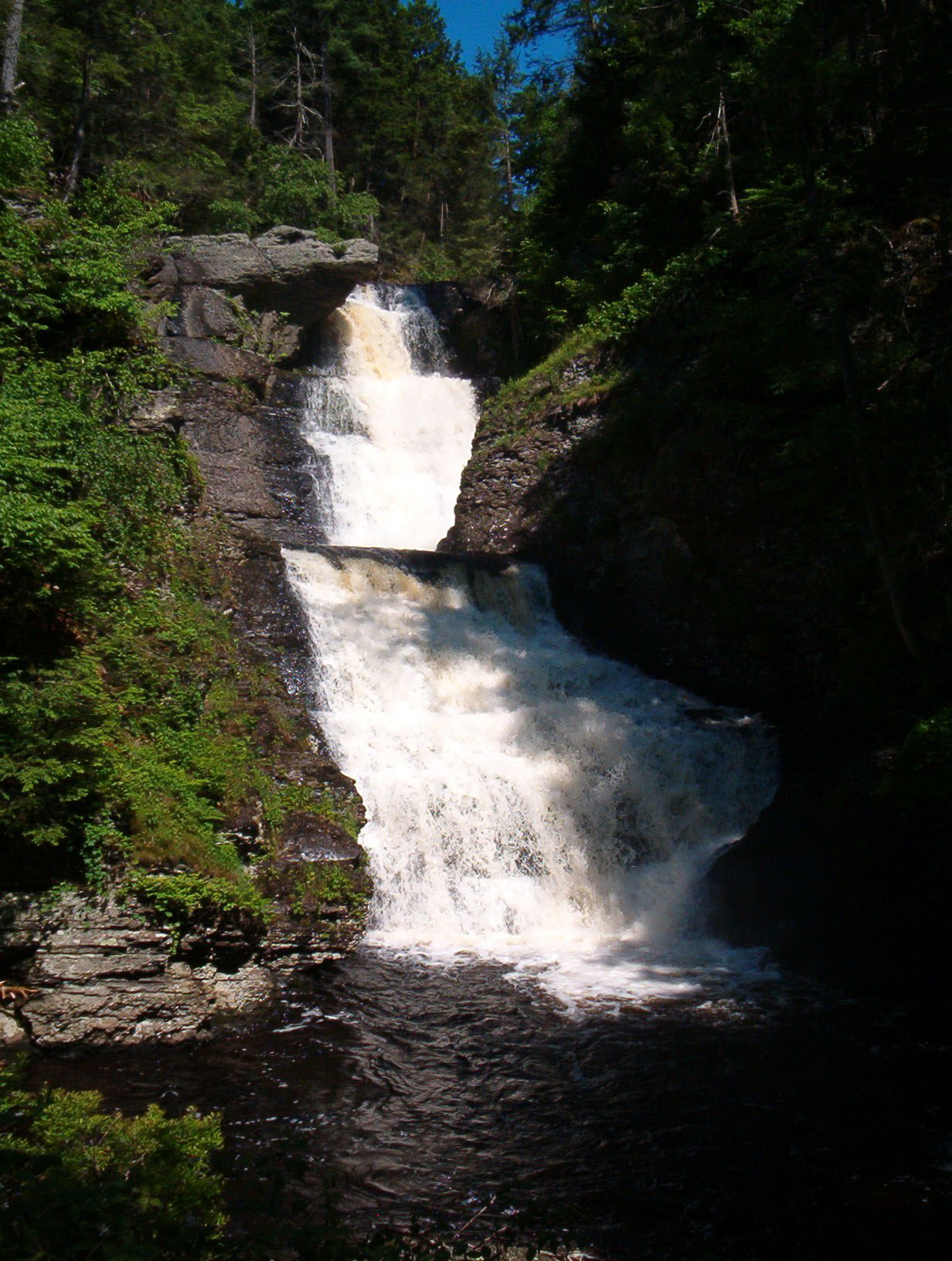
Raymondskill Falls

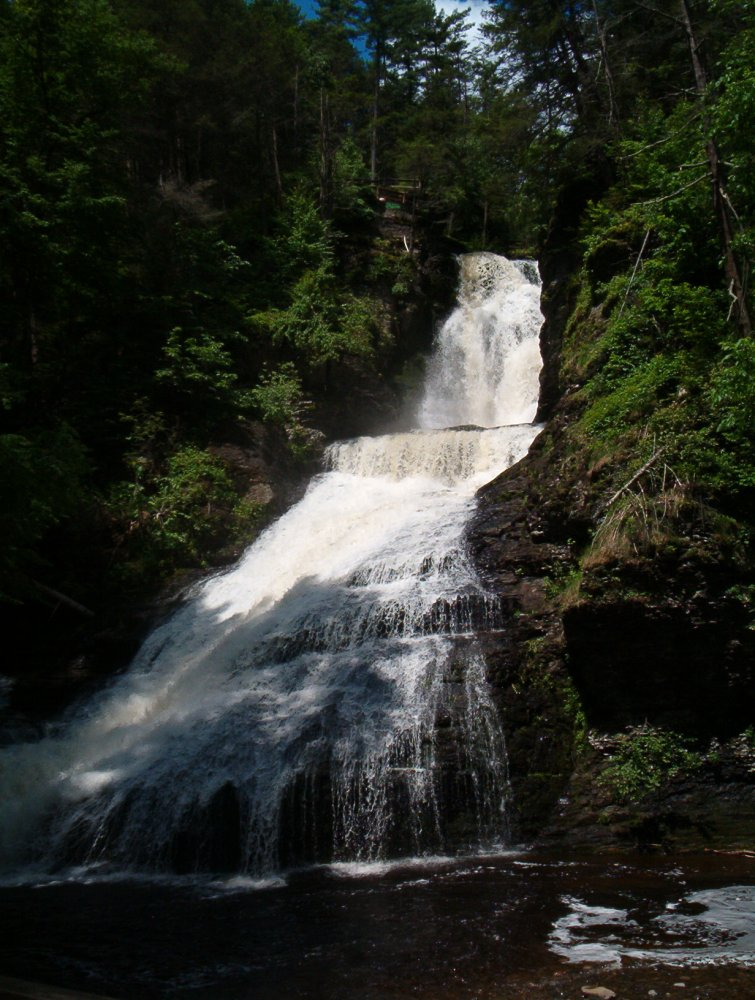
Dingman's Falls

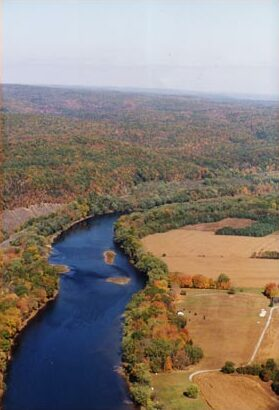
Middle Delaware River above Walpack Bend

View of Mount Tammany from Delaware Water Gap

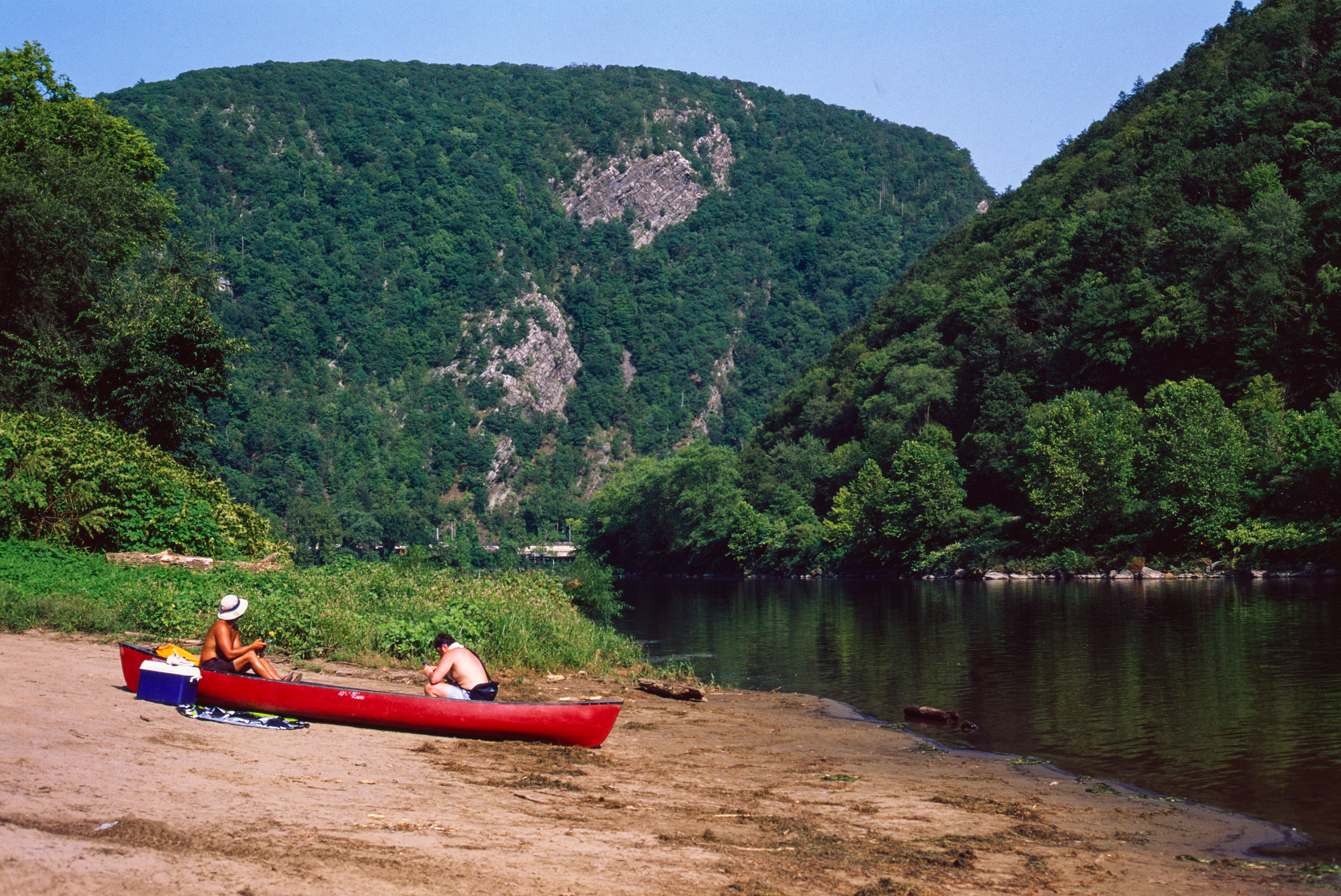
Two recreationalists rest in a beached canoe at the base of Mount Tammany

== Notable sites within the Park ==
- Brau Kettle
- Brodhead Farm
- Callahan House
- Cold Spring Farm Springhouse
- Dingman's Ferry Dutch Reformed Church
- Metz Ice Plant
- John Michael Farm
- List of waterfalls of the Delaware Water Gap
- Military Trail
- Nyce Farm
- Schoonover Mountain House
- Capt. Jacob Shoemaker House
- John Turn Farm
- Marie Zimmermann Farm
- Van Campen's Inn
- Raymondskill Falls
- Zion Lutheran Church
