= Minisink =

Loosely defined geographic region of the Upper Delaware River valley

Coordinates: 41°05′36″N 74°59′32″W

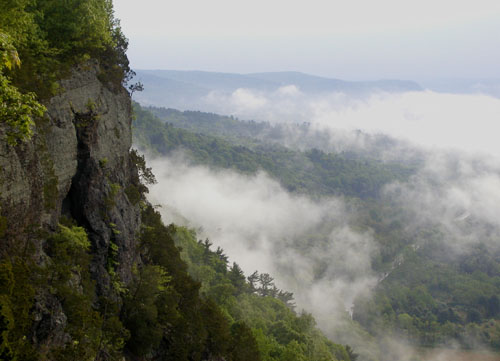
Fog surrounds cliffs looming over the Delaware River whose valley is the core of the historic Minisink region, July 2007

The Minisink or (more recently) Minisink Valley is a loosely defined geographic region of the Upper Delaware River valley in northwestern New Jersey (Sussex and Warren counties), northeastern Pennsylvania (Pike and Monroe counties) and New York (Orange and Sullivan counties).

The name was derived by Dutch colonists from the Munsee name for the area, as bands of their people took names after geographic places which they inhabited as territory throughout the mid-Atlantic area. Originally inhabited by Munsee, the northern branch of the Lenape or Delaware Indians, the area's first European settlers arrived in the late seventeenth and early eighteenth centuries and were Dutch and French Huguenot families from colonial New York's Hudson River Valley. The term "Minisink" is not used often today. It is preserved because of its historical relevance concerning the early European settlement of the region during the American colonial period and as an artifact of the early "first contact" between Native Americans and early European explorers, traders and missionaries in the seventeenth century.

Much of the historical Minisink region has been incorporated into the Delaware Water Gap National Recreation Area after defeat of a controversial dam project proposed to be built by U.S. Army Corps of Engineers on the Delaware River near Tocks Island.

== Meaning of the name "Minisink" ==
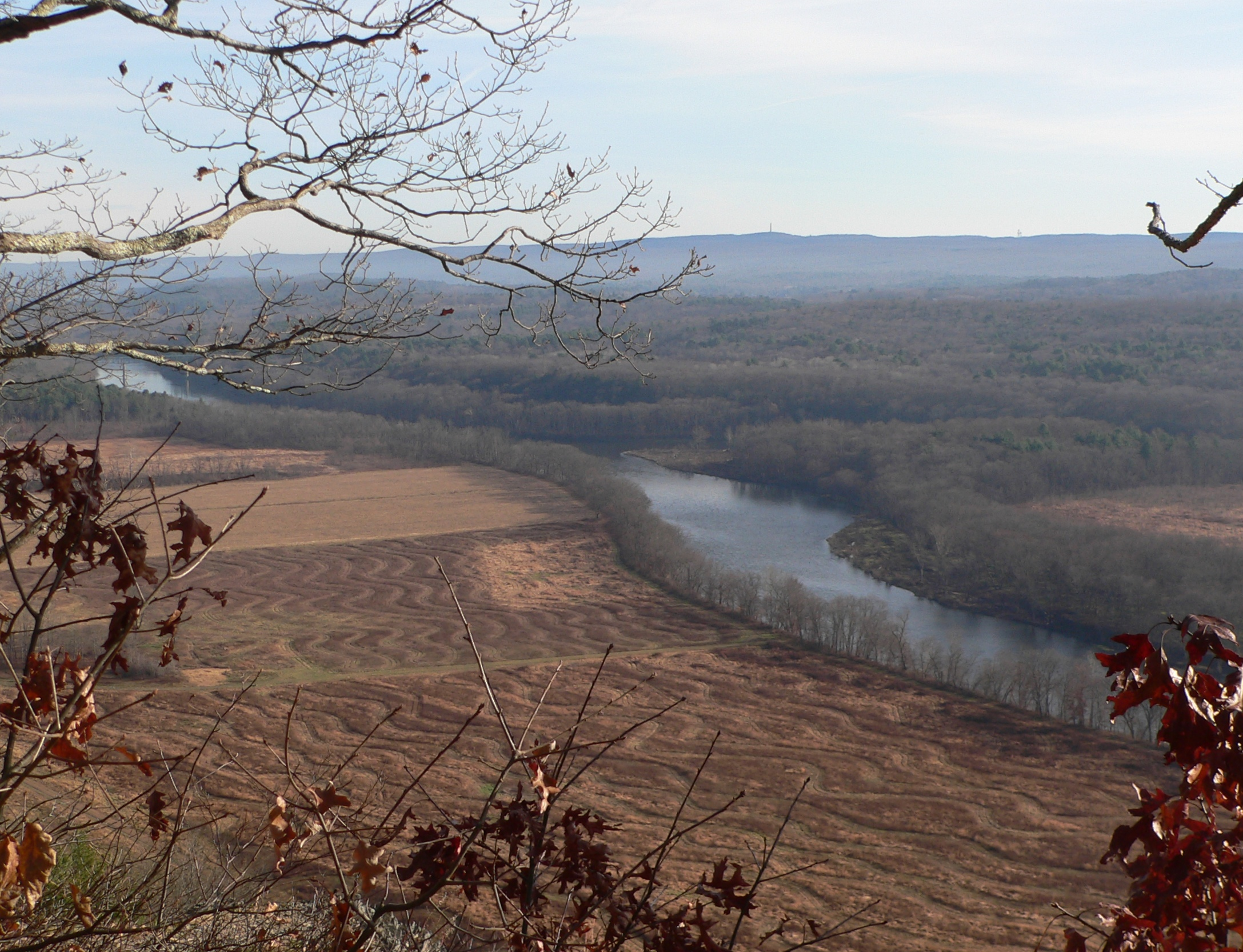
Minisink Island's north end (center) seen from the Delaware Water Gap National Recreation Area's Cliff Trail in Pennsylvania

The name Minisink comes from the Munsee dialect of Lenape, a group of similar Algonquian dialects that were spoken by the various groups of Lenape, or Delaware Indians who inhabited the region before European colonization. Minisink means "at the island" from the Algonquin root word minis, meaning island.

During the colonial period, the Minisink was also an area of significant skirmishes and raids between British and French-allied forces in the French and Indian War (the North American front of the Seven Years' War). In response to attacks by larger forces of Delaware, Benjamin Franklin ordered the construction of a series of forts along the Pennsylvanian side of the Delaware River. These forts included Fort Hyndshaw, Fort Dupuy, Fort Norris, and Fort Hamilton, among others.

Earlier historians posited that Minisink meant "people of the stony country" or "where the stones are gathered together." However, Smithsonian linguist Ives Goddard states that any of the attempts to derive either Minisink or Munsee from words meaning "stone" or "mountain," as proposed by these writers (including Lenape scholar Daniel G. Brinton), are incorrect.

== Geology and geography ==
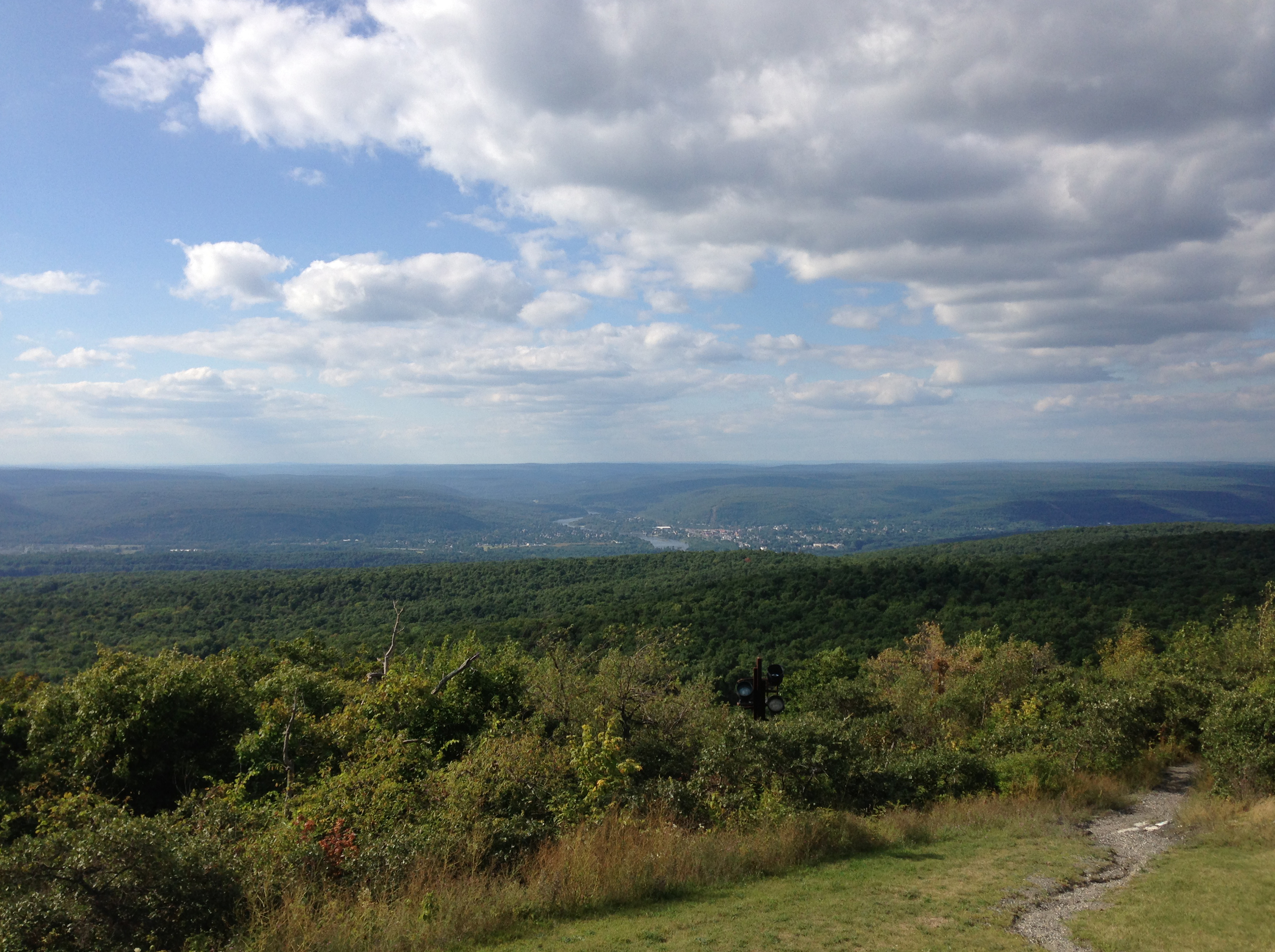
Matamoras, PA (L), the Delaware River (Center), and Port Jervis, NY (R)

=== Defining the Minisink area ===
The Minisink has never been known as a region with distinct, set boundaries. It generally has been conceived as the valley of the Delaware River going northward from the Delaware Water Gap and including the valley of the Neversink River (a tributary entering the Delaware near Port Jervis, New York). According to Vosburgh, "The 'Minisink county' consists of the valley of the Neversink west of the Shawangunk Mountains, and the Delaware valley, as far as the Delaware Water Gap." Some sources imply that it was confined to the width of valley of the Delaware and its surrounding hillsides.

Other sources define the region as an area extending for 20–30 miles to the east and west of the river. This latter definition would include parts or all of the Kittatinny Valley to the east of Kittatinny Mountain in New Jersey, and westward deep into northeastern Pennsylvania. East of the Shawangunk ridge, in New York are the Town of Greenville and the Town of Minisink, both often included as part of the Minisink region. Their residents attend Minisink Valley Central School District.

=== Course of the Delaware River ===
The Delaware River was often referred to as the Minisink River in early Dutch colonial documents and on early maps. The Delaware River constitutes part of the boundary between Pennsylvania and New York, and the entire boundary between New Jersey and Pennsylvania. The middle section of the Delaware River's course, roughly between Port Jervis, New York and the Delaware Water Gap (a break in Kittatinny Mountain where the river runs through) constitutes the north and southern points of the Minisink or Minisink Valley. The river flows down a broad Appalachian valley. The Minisink is a buried valley, where the Delaware flows in a bed of glacial till that buried the eroded bedrock during the last glacial period.

At Port Jervis, New York, the river enters the Port Jervis trough. At this point, the Walpack Ridge deflects the Delaware into the Minisink Valley. It follows the southwest strike of the eroded Marcellus Formation beds along the Pennsylvania–New Jersey state line for 25 miles (40 km) to the end of the ridge at Walpack Bend in Walpack Township, New Jersey in the Delaware Water Gap National Recreation Area. It skirts the Kittatinny ridge, which it crosses at the Delaware Water Gap, between nearly vertical walls of sandstone, quartzite, and conglomerate.

=== Appalachian Mountains ===
The features of the Ridge and Valley province were created approximately 300–400 million years ago during the Ordovician period and Appalachian orogeny—a period of tremendous pressure and rock thrusting that caused the creation of the Appalachian Mountains. This physiographic province occupies approximately two-thirds of the county's area—the county's western and central sections. Its contour is characterized by long, even ridges with long, continuous valleys in between that generally run parallel from southwest to northeast. This region is largely formed by sedimentary rock.

Kittatinny Mountain is the dominant geological feature in the parts of the Minisink located within New Jersey. It is part of the Appalachian Mountains, and part of a ridge that continues as the Blue Ridge or Blue Mountain in Eastern Pennsylvania, and as Shawangunk Ridge in New York. It begins in New Jersey as the eastern half of the Delaware Water Gap, and runs northeast to southwest along the Delaware River. Elevations range from 1,200 to 1,800 feet and attains a maximum elevation of 1,803 feet at High Point, in Montague Township. Between Kittatinny Mountain and the Delaware River is the Walpack Ridge, with elevations of 500 to 800 feet. It is a smaller ridge that parallels Kittatinny Mountain between the Walpack Bend and Port Jervis, New York, and encloses the watershed of the Flat Brook which is also called Walpack Valley.

The Kittatinny Valley lies to the east of Kittatinny Mountain and ends with the Highlands in the east. It is largely a region of rolling hills and flat valley floors. Elevations in this valley range from 400 to 1,000 feet. It is part of the Great Appalachian Valley running from eastern Canada to northern Alabama. This valley is shared by three major watersheds—the Wallkill River, with its tributaries Pochuck Creek and Papakating Creek flowing north; and the Paulins Kill watershed and Pequest River watershed flowing southwest.

Kittatinny's valley floor is part of the Ordovician Martinsburg Formation (shale and slate) which make up most of the valley—and the Jacksonburg Formation (mostly limestone). The mountain is of the Silurian Shawangunk Conglomerate which is mainly composed of quartz. Due to the hardness of the quartz, the mountain is extremely resistant to weathering.

== History ==
=== The Lenape and other cultures ===
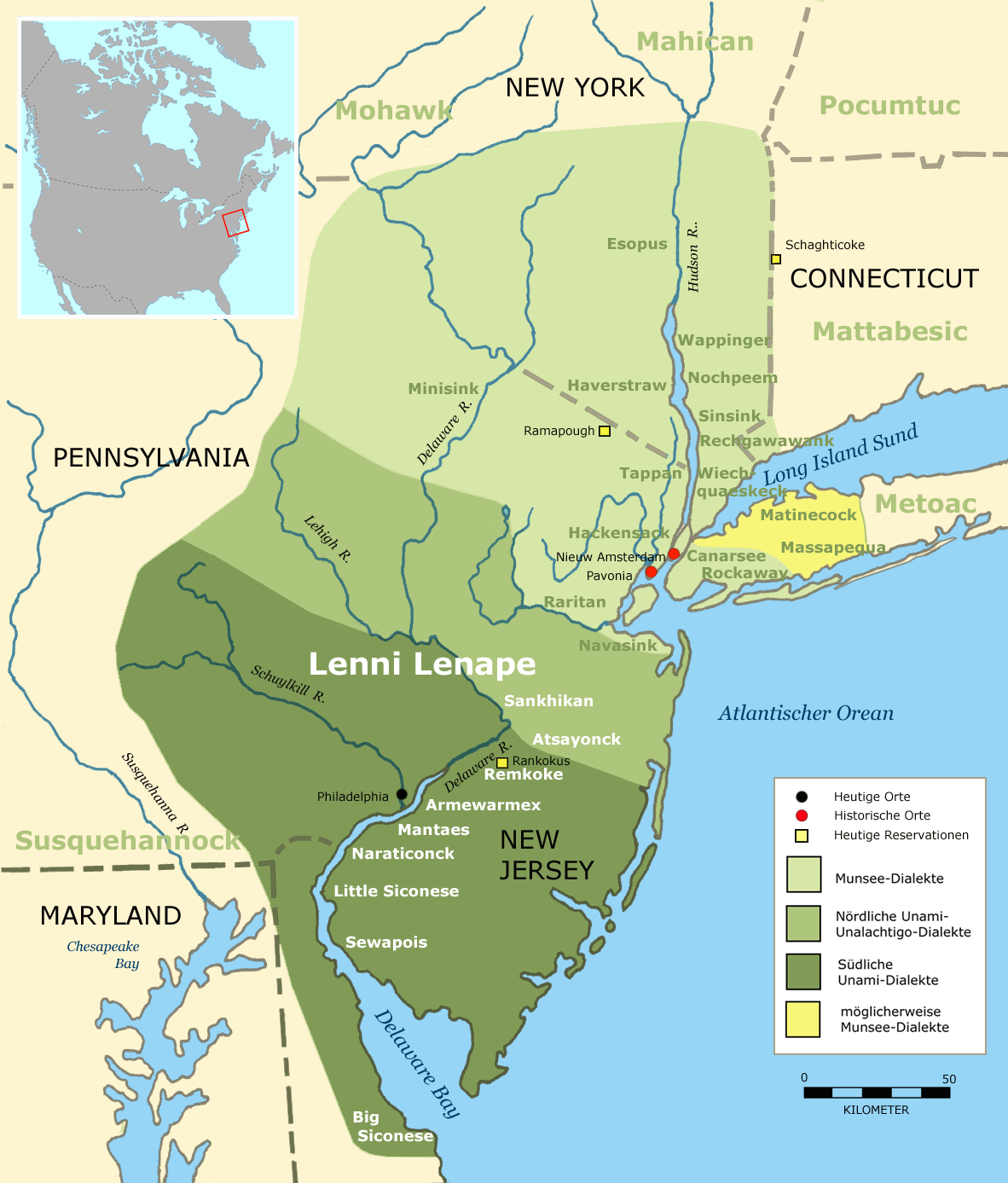
Map showing the aboriginal boundaries of Lenape territories divided by dialect with Munsee territory (including the Minisink Valley) in the lightly shaded northernmost area

This area was occupied for thousands of years by succeeding cultures of indigenous peoples. At the time of European encounter, the historic Lenape (/ˈlɛnəpiː/ or /ləˈnɑːpi/), a Native American people, also called Delaware Indians after their historic territory along the Delaware River, inhabited the mid-Atlantic coastal areas and inland along the Hudson and Delaware rivers. As a result of disruption following the French and Indian War (1756–1763), the American Revolutionary War (1775–1783), and later Indian removals from the eastern United States, the main groups now live in Ontario (Canada), and Wisconsin and Oklahoma in the United States. In Canada, they are enrolled in the Munsee-Delaware Nation, the Moravian of the Thames First Nation, and the Delaware of Six Nations. In the United States, they are enrolled in three federally recognized tribes, the Delaware Nation and the Delaware Tribe of Indians located in Oklahoma, and the Stockbridge-Munsee Community, located in Wisconsin. The Ramapough Mountain Indians and the Nanticoke Lenni-Lenape Tribal Nation, recognized as tribes by the state of New Jersey, identify as Lenape descendants.

=== Condemnation ===
The Delaware River is prone to floods—some resulting from seasonal snow melt or rain run-off from heavy rainstorms. However, record flooding occurred in August 1955 in the aftermath of two separate hurricanes (Hurricane Connie and Hurricane Diane) that passed over the area within the span of one week. On 19 August 1955, the river gauge at Riegelsville, Pennsylvania recorded that the Delaware River reached a crest of 38.85 feet (11.84 m) above flood stage.

A project to dam the river near Tocks Island was in the works before the 1955 floods. But several deaths and severe damages resulting from these floods brought the issue of flood control to the national level. The U.S. Army Corps of Engineers proposed the construction of the dam which would have created a 37-mile (60-km) long lake between Pennsylvania and New Jersey, with depths of up to 140 feet. The area around the lake would be established as the Tocks Island National Recreation Area under the oversight of the National Park Service to offer recreation activities such as hunting, hiking, fishing, and boating. In addition to flood control and recreation, the dam would be used to generate hydroelectric power, and provide a clean water supply to New York City and Philadelphia.

Starting in 1960, the present day area of the Recreation Area was acquired for the Army Corps of Engineers through eminent domain. Approximately 15,000 people were displaced by the condemnation of personal property along the Delaware River and the surrounding area through eminent domain. An estimated 3,000 to 5,000 dwellings and outbuildings were demolished in preparation for the dam project and subsequent flooding of the valley. This included many irreplaceable historical sites and structures connected with the valley's colonial and Native American heritage. The plan was embroiled in controversy and protest by environmental groups and embittered displaced residents. Because of considerable opposition from environmental activists, the unavailability of government funding, and a geological assessment of the dam's safety given its location near active fault lines, the federal government transferred the property to the National Park Service in 1978 and the project's land holdings were reorganized to create the Delaware Water Gap National Recreation Area.

== See also ==
- Brau Kettle
- Minisink Archaeological Site
