= List of fly fishing waters in North America =

The articles listed below on specific bodies of water—seas, lakes, rivers, etc. have significant content on the subject of fly fishing for the fish that swim in them or are notable fly fishing destinations in North America.

== United States ==
- Alabama
  - Sipsey River - below Smith Lake Dam
- Alaska
  - Chena River - Premier dry-fly fishing for Arctic grayling
  - Russian River - Fly fishing only for sockeye and silver salmon
- Arizona
  - Lee's Ferry - trout
- Arkansas
  - White River
  - Little Red River
  - Buffalo River
  - Crooked Creek
  - North Fork River
  - Little Buffalo River
- California
  - Kern River
  - Pit River
  - Volcano Creek
- Colorado
  - Animas River
  - Arkansas River
  - Fryingpan River
  - Gunnison River
  - North Platte River
  - Rio Grande
  - Roaring Fork River
- Connecticut
  - Farmington River
- Florida
  - Biscayne Bay
  - Florida Keys
  - Florida Gulf Coast
- Georgia
  - Chattahoochee River
  - Dukes Creek
- Idaho
  - Big Lost River
  - Big Wood River
  - Boise River
  - Clearwater River
  - Coeur d'Alene River
  - Fall River
  - Henrys Fork (Snake River)—Fly fishing only within Harriman State Park
  - Lochsa River
  - Saint Joe River
  - Salmon River
  - Selway River
  - Silver Creek
  - Teton River
- Kentucky
  - Cumberland River
- Maine
  - Penobscot River - World class landlocked salmon fishery on the West Branch
- Maryland
  - Potomac River - North Branch
  - Savage River
  - Youghiogheny River
- Massachusetts
  - Deerfield River
  - Millers River
  - Swift River
  - Westfield River
- Michigan
  - Au Sable River - Blue Ribbon trout fishery known for trophy brown trout. Also known as Michigan's "holy waters."
  - Huron River - Blue Ribbon smallmouth bass fishery in the Dexter-Ann Arbor area.
  - Pere Marquette River - The PM is especially known for its fall run salmon, but it has its share of large trout and steelhead.
- Minnesota (see also Category:Minnesota trout streams)
  - Camp Creek (Trout), (Fillmore County)
  - Crooked Creek (Trout), (Houston County)
  - Devil Track River
  - Hay Creek (Trout), (Goodhue County)
  - Mississippi River (Bass)
  - Pigeon River
  - Pine Creek (Trout), (Fillmore, Winona Counties)
  - Root River - North and South Branches (Trout); Middle and South Forks (Trout)
  - Rush Creek (Trout), (Fillmore and Winona Counties)
  - Snake River (Bass)
  - Vermillion River (Pike, Trout) (Dakota County)
  - Whitewater River Main, Middle and South Forks (Trout), (Olmstead, Winona, Wabasha Counties)
  - Winnebago Creek (Trout), (Houston County)
- Missouri
  - Bennett Spring State Park
  - Capps Creek
  - Crane Creek - known for the rare opportunity to catch a genetically pure strain of the McCloud Rainbow Trout.
  - Lake Taneycomo
  - Maramec Spring Park
  - Montauk State Park
  - Niangua River
  - Roaring River State Park
- Montana
  - Big Hole River—A Blue Ribbon trout stream. Catch and release for grayling and westslope cutthroat trout Catch and release for brown trout (Dickey bridge to mouth)
  - Beaverhead River - Catch and release for brown trout
  - Bitterroot River
  - Blackfoot River - A Blue Ribbon trout stream
  - Boulder River - A Blue Ribbon trout stream
  - Clark Fork
  - Dearborn River
  - DePuy Spring Creek
  - East Gallatin River
  - Gallatin River - A Blue Ribbon trout stream
  - Glacier National Park - Catch and release fishing for bull trout
  - Madison River - A Blue Ribbon trout stream. Headwaters fly fishing only in Yellowstone National Park.
  - Missouri River - Canyon Ferry Dam to Cascade, MT
  - Ruby River - rainbow and brown trout in lower reaches, cutbow and Arctic grayling in headwaters
  - Yellowstone River - A Blue Ribbon trout stream. Headwaters in Wyoming and Yellowstone National Park
- Nevada
  - Truckee River
- New Hampshire
  - Androscoggin River
  - Connecticut River - Fly fishing only above Lake Francis
- New Jersey
  - Flat Brook (including tributaries Big Flat Brook and Little Flat Brook)
  - Paulins Kill
  - Pequest River
- New Mexico
  - Cimarron River
  - Pecos River
  - Rio Grande, Upper
  - Rio Chama
  - San Juan River
- New York
  - Ausable River
  - Batten Kill
  - Beaver Kill
  - Carmans River special reg trout
  - Connetquot River special reg trout
  - East Branch Delaware River
  - Esopus Creek
  - Neversink River
  - Nissequogue River special reg trout
  - New York City Watershed Waters special reg trout
  - Schoharie Creek
  - West Branch Delaware River
  - Willowemoc Creek
- North Carolina
  - Cheoah River
  - Davidson River
  - French Broad River - upstream of Brevard
  - Green River
  - Linville River
  - Nantahala River
  - Pigeon River - upstream of Canton
  - Tuckasegee River
  - Watauga River
- Ohio
  - Mad River
  - Clear Fork River
  - Clear Fork Mohican River
  - Chagrin River
  - Rocky River
- Oregon
  - Deschutes River
  - North Umpqua River
- Pennsylvania
  - Big Spring Creek-Cumberland special reg trout
  - Falling Spring Branch special reg trout
  - Fishing Creek
  - Jordan Creek
  - Lackawaxen River
  - LeTort Spring Run - Catch and release fly fishing only
  - Little Juniata River
  - Little Lehigh Creek special reg trout
  - Ridley Creek State Park
  - Yellow Breeches Creek special reg trout
- Tennessee
  - Bald River
  - Caney Fork
  - Elk River
  - Great Smoky Mountains National Park - Also in North Carolina
  - Hiwassee River
  - Holston River
  - Tellico River
  - Watauga River
- Vermont
  - Batten Kill
- Virginia
  - James River
  - New River (Bass, Musky)
  - Shenandoah River (Bass)
  - Rapidan River
  - Shenandoah River (Bass)
  - Shenandoah National Park
- Utah
  - San Juan River - Also in Colorado and New Mexico
  - Provo River - World class trout fishery close to Utah's major cities. Brown and rainbow trout reach record lengths, with a typical fish running 18 inches or bigger. There are 3 branches to the Provo River, the lower, middle, and upper.
- Washington
  - Yakima River
- West Virginia
  - Cheat River
  - Lost River
  - Mill Run
- Wyoming
  - Yellowstone National Park:
    - Firehole River - Fly fishing only in Yellowstone National Park
    - Gibbon River - Fly fishing only below Gibbon Falls
    - Lamar River - Major river in core of Yellowstone cutthroat trout population
    - Slough Creek
  - North Platte River

== Canada ==
Quebec

- Du-Diable River*
- Cache River*
- Doncaster River*
- Du-Nord River*
- Ouareau River*
- Shawinigan River*
- Châteauguay River*
- Yamaska River*
- Nicolet River*,#
- Du-Gouffre River**
- Jacques-Cartier River*
- Momonrency River*
- Malbaie River**
- Etchemin River*
- Kedgwick River**
- Ouelle River**
- Rimouski River**
- A-Mars River**
- Petit-Saguenay River**
- Saint-Jean River**, Saguenay
- Sainte-Marguerite River**
- Aux-Saumon River**
- Aux-Rochers River**
- Des-Escoumins River**
- Godbout River**
- Laval River**
- Moisie River**
- Trinite River**
- Saint-Jean River**, Côte-Nord
- Piashti River**
- Petit-Watshishou River**
- Nabisipi River**
- Nathashquan River**
- Kegaska River**
- Musguaro River**
- Muskanousse River**
- Washicoutai River**
- Gros-Mecatina River**
- Kecarpoui River**
- Coxipi River**
- Saint-Paul River**
- Jupiter River**
- De-la-Chaloupe River**
- Bonaventure River**
- Cap-Chat River**
- Cacapedia River**
- Causapscal River**
- Dartmouth River**
- Grande River**
- Grand-Pabos-Nord River**
- Grand-Pabos-Ouest River**
- Madeleine River**
- Nouvelle River**
- Malbaie River**, Gaspé Peninsula
- Matane River**
- Matapedia River**
- Patapedia River**
- Petit-Cascapedia River**
- Petit-Pabos River**
- Port-Daniel River**
- Restigouche River**
- Sainte-Anne River**
- Saint-Jean River**, Gaspé Peninsula
- York River**

Ontario

- Burnt River - smallmouth bass fly fishing river
- Credit River
- Grand River - brown trout and other species
- Nipigon River
- Ottawa River
- Saugeen River - smallmouth bass and brown trout fly fishing river

New Brunswick

- Miramichi River
- Restigouche River

Notes:

- *Trout
- **Salmon
- #Bass

== See also ==
- List of fly fishing waters in Europe
