= Wallpack (disambiguation) =

Wallpack or Walpack may refer to the following in Sussex County, New Jersey in the United States:

- Walpack Township, New Jersey
- Wallpack Ridge
- Wallpack Valley
