= Wallpack Ridge =

- Walpack Ridge
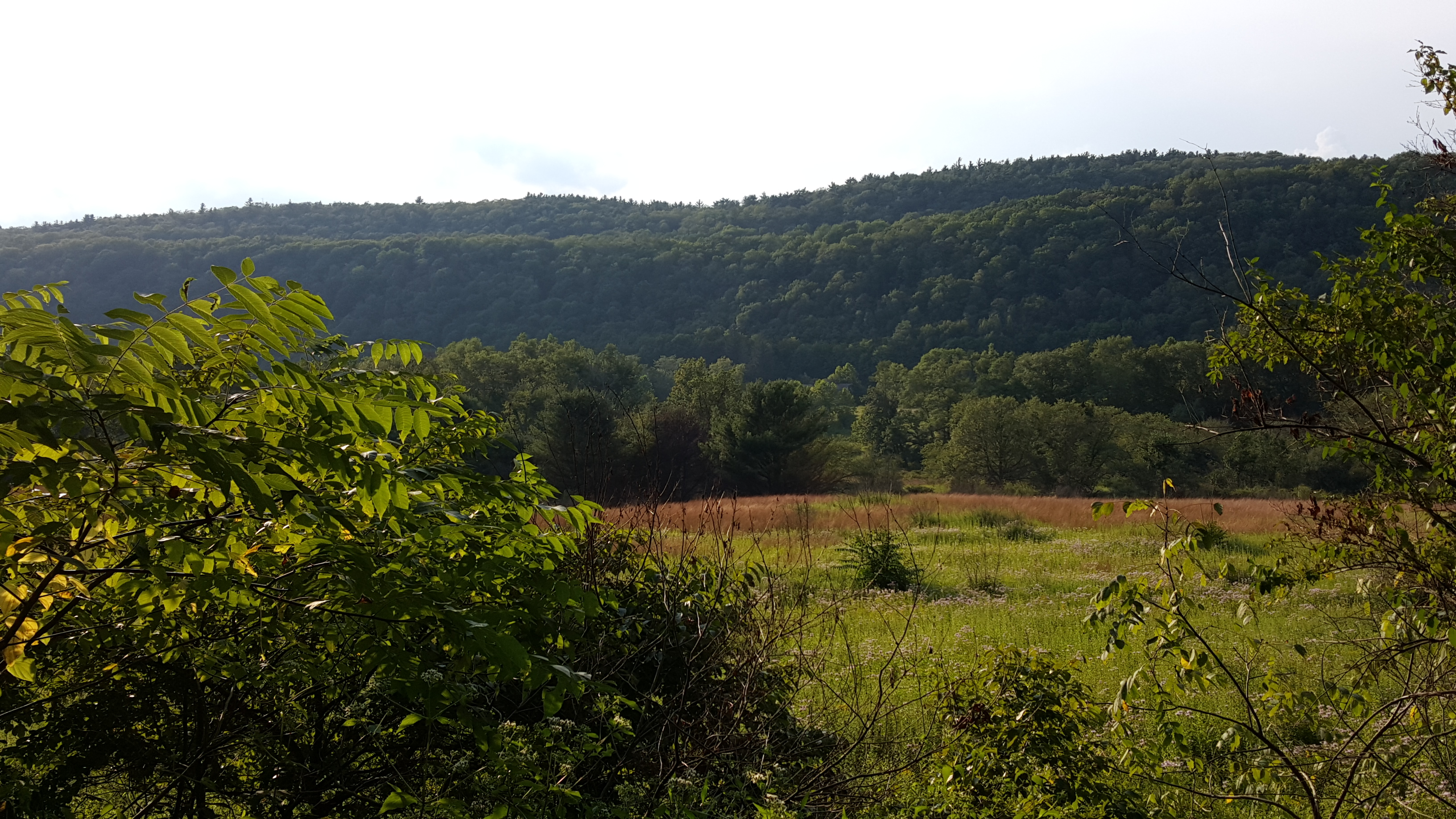
- Wallpack Ridge seen from Mountain Road

Highest point
- Elevation: 928 ft (283 m)
- Coordinates: 41°8′7.649″N 74°54′34.65″W

Geography
- Location within Sussex County, New Jersey
- Location: Sussex County, New Jersey
- Range coordinates: 41°14′1.234″N 74°51′10.147″W
- Parent range: Kittatinny Mountain

Geology
- Rock age: Late Silurian
- Mountain type: Dendritic ridge

Climbing
- Access: Restricted access roads

Wallpack Ridge (or Walpack Ridge) is a mountain located in the Ridge and Valley Appalachians physiographic province in Sussex County in northwestern New Jersey. Oriented northeast to southwest, Wallpack Ridge spans 25 miles (40 km) from Montague Township south of Port Jervis, New York to the Walpack Bend in the Delaware River near Flatbrookville in Walpack Township. It is a narrow ridge ranging between 0.67 miles (1.08 km) to 1.7 miles (2.7 km) in width, and its highest elevation reaches 928 feet (283 m) above sea level. The ridge separates the Wallpack Valley from the valley of the Delaware River (also known as the Minisink or Minisink Valley), and contains the watershed of the Flat Brook and its main tributaries Big Flat Brook and Little Flat Brook.

A controversial project to build a hydroelectric dam and reservoir on the Delaware River in the 1950s and 1960s led to government's seizure of land in northwestern New Jersey and northeastern Pennsylvania under the authority of the U.S. Army Corps of Engineers. The construction of the dam would have created a lake reservoir that would have flooded the Walpack Valley. For political and geological reasons, the dam project was deauthorized and the land transferred to the management of the National Park Service for the establishment of a National Recreation Area. Currently, Wallpack Ridge is located in the Delaware Water Gap National Recreation Area that was established by the National Park Service in 1978.

== See also ==
- Brau Kettle
- Geology of New Jersey
- Old Mine Road
- Van Campen's Inn
