= Sunrise Mountain (New Jersey) =

Mountain in New Jersey, USA

- Location within Sussex County, New Jersey

Highest point
- Elevation: 1,650 ft (500 m) NGVD 29 (Note: Verified elevation from USGS topographic map Branchville)
- Coordinates: 41°13′05″N 74°43′14″W

Geography
- Location: Sussex County, New Jersey, U.S.
- Parent range: Kittatinny Mountains
- Topo map: USGS Branchville

Climbing
- Easiest route: Hike

Sunrise Mountain is a peak of the Kittatinny Mountains in Sussex County, New Jersey, United States. The mountain is 1,650 feet (503 m) tall, and overlooks Beemerville to the east. It lies along the Appalachian Trail in Stokes State Forest.

The crest of Sunrise Mountain is one of the most frequently visited sites in Stokes State Forest. The thin soil and harsh climate characteristic of Sunrise Mountain is a difficult environment in which few plants can survive. Mountain laurel, blueberry, pitch pine and bear oak are among the natural vegetation found throughout the area. The pavilion at the summit was built in the late 1930s by the Civilian Conservation Corps.

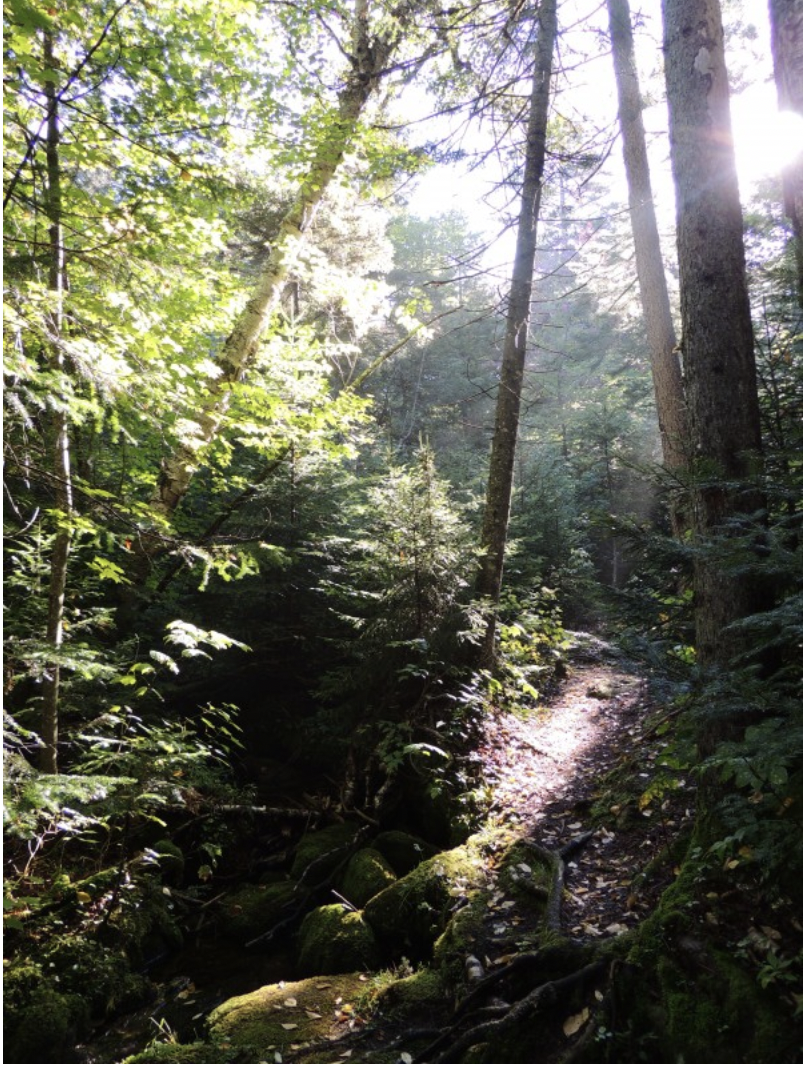
Path up Sunrise Mountain
