= Sandyston Township, New Jersey =

Township in Sussex County, New Jersey, US

- Township
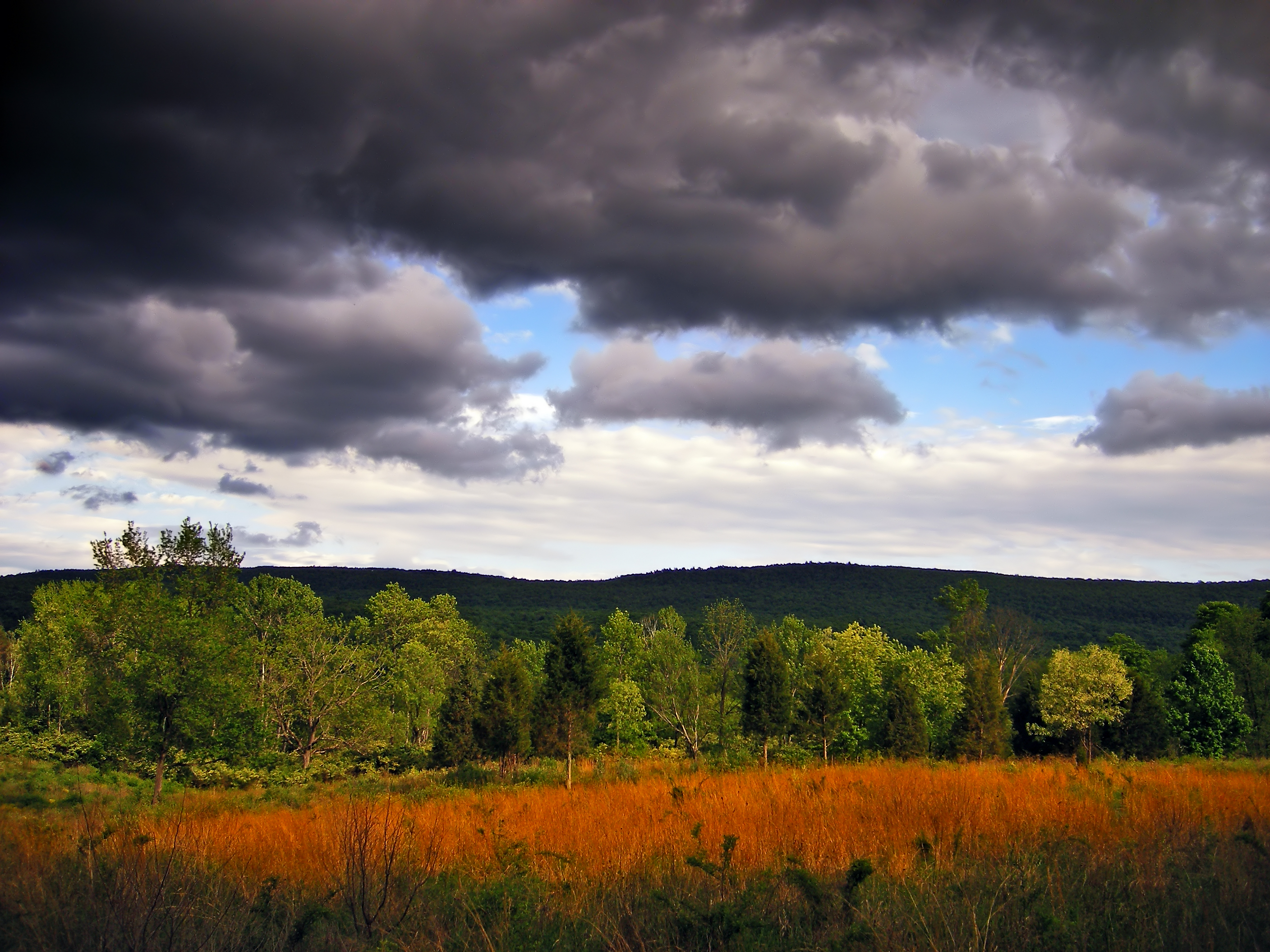
- Sandyston Township in May 2007

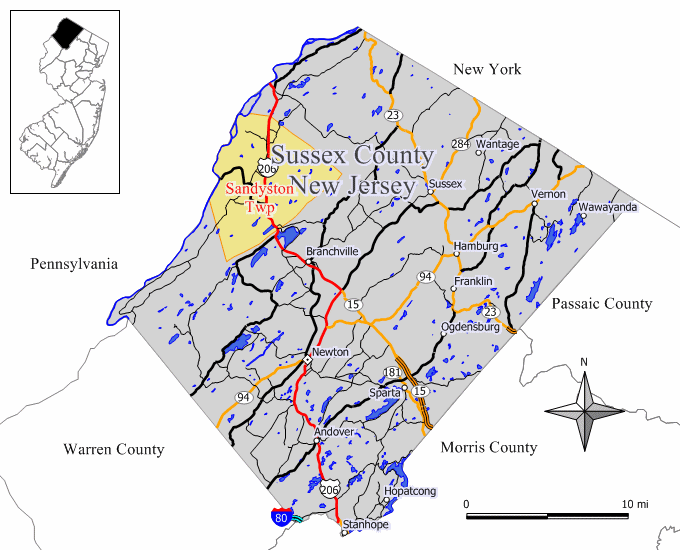
- Map of Sandyston Township in Sussex County. Inset: Location of Sussex County highlighted in the State of New Jersey.

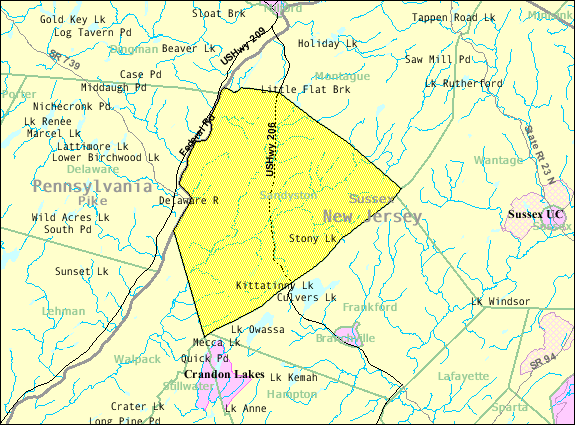
- Census Bureau map of Sandyston Township, New Jersey

- Location in Sussex County Location in New Jersey Location in the United States
- Coordinates: 41.213621°N 74.81353°W
- Country: United States
- State: New Jersey
- County: Sussex
- Royal charter: February 26, 1762
- Incorporated: February 21, 1798

Government
  - Type: Township
  - Body: Township Committee
  - Mayor: George B. Harper Jr. (R, term ends December 31, 2026)
  - Municipal clerk: Amanda "Amy" Lobban

Area
  - Total: 42.06 sq mi (108.94 km^{2})
  - Land: 41.33 sq mi (107.05 km^{2})
  - Water: 0.73 sq mi (1.89 km^{2}) 1.74%
  - Rank: 48th of 565 in state 4th of 24 in county
- Elevation: 692 ft (211 m)

Population (2020)
  - Total: 1,977
  - Estimate (2023): 2,006
  - Rank: 486th of 565 in state 21st of 24 in county
  - Density: 47.9/sq mi (18.5/km^{2})
  - Rank: 553rd of 565 in state 23rd of 24 in county
- Time zone: UTC−05:00 (Eastern (EST))
  - Summer (DST): UTC−04:00 (Eastern (EDT))
- ZIP Code: 07826 – Branchville
- Area code: 973
- FIPS code: 3403765700
- GNIS feature ID: 0882255
- Website: www.sandystontownship.com

Sandyston Township is a small rural township in Sussex County, in the U.S. state of New Jersey. It is located in the northwestern part of the state near the Pennsylvania border. The township is surrounded by and part of many national and state parks. As of the 2020 United States census, the township's population was 1,977, a decrease of 21 (−1.1%) from the 2010 census count of 1,998, which in turn reflected an increase of 173 (+9.5%) from the 1,825 counted in the 2000 census. Sandyston's growth in recent years has been attributed to the influx of people from more urban parts of the state and even New York City, located less than 75 miles (121 km) away.

New Jersey Monthly magazine ranked Sandyston Township 26th on its 2008 rankings of the "Best Places To Live" in New Jersey.

Sandyston was first formed by royal charter on February 26, 1762, from portions of Walpack Township. Sandyston was incorporated as a township on February 21, 1798, by an act of the New Jersey Legislature as part of the initial group of 104 townships incorporated in the state.

== Geography ==
According to the U.S. Census Bureau, the township had a total area of 42.06 square miles (108.94 km^{2}), including 41.33 square miles (107.05 km^{2}) of land and 0.73 square miles (1.89 km^{2}) of water (1.74%).

The township ranges from 300 to 1,600 feet (91 to 488 m) above sea level. A ridge runs along the eastern half of the township called the Kittatinny Mountains. The highest point in the township is Sunrise Mountain in Stokes State Forest. The lowest point is around the Delaware River in the western half of the township.

Unincorporated communities, localities and place names located partially or completely within the township include Abertown, Bevans, Centerville, Dingmans Ferry, Hainesville, Kittatinny Lake, Lake Ashroe, Layton, Namanack Island, Normanock, Peters Valley, Shaytown, Stoney Lake and Tuttles Corner.

Sandyston Township borders the Sussex County municipalities of Frankford Township, Montague Township and Walpack Township.

== Demographics ==
Historical population
Census	Pop.	Note	%±
1810	703		—
1820	858		22.0%
1830	1,097		27.9%
1840	1,209		10.2%
1850	1,327		9.8%
1860	1,480		11.5%
1870	1,230		−16.9%
1880	1,195		−2.8%
1890	1,084		−9.3%
1900	939		−13.4%
1910	855		−8.9%
1920	727		−15.0%
1930	610		−16.1%
1940	651		6.7%
1950	829		27.3%
1960	1,019		22.9%
1970	1,303		27.9%
1980	1,485		14.0%
1990	1,732		16.6%
2000	1,825		5.4%
2010	1,998		9.5%
2020	1,977		−1.1%
2023 (est.)	2,006		1.5%
Population sources: 1800–1920 1840; 1850–1870 1850 1870; 1880–1890 1890–1910 1910–1930; 1940–2000 2000; 2010 2020

=== 2010 census ===
The 2010 United States census counted 1,998 people, 788 households, and 561 families in the township. The population density was 47.0 inhabitants per square mile (18.1/km^{2}). There were 988 housing units at an average density of 23.2 per square mile (9.0/km^{2}). The racial makeup was 97.45% (1,947) White, 0.40% (8) Black or African American, 0.10% (2) Native American, 0.55% (11) Asian, 0.00% (0) Pacific Islander, 0.30% (6) from other races, and 1.20% (24) from two or more races. Hispanic or Latino of any race were 3.40% (68) of the population.

Of the 788 households, 29.9% had children under the age of 18; 58.8% were married couples living together; 7.9% had a female householder with no husband present and 28.8% were non-families. Of all households, 22.6% were made up of individuals and 7.6% had someone living alone who was 65 years of age or older. The average household size was 2.54 and the average family size was 3.01.

22.5% of the population were under the age of 18, 7.7% from 18 to 24, 21.6% from 25 to 44, 36.5% from 45 to 64, and 11.7% who were 65 years of age or older. The median age was 43.7 years. For every 100 females, the population had 98.8 males. For every 100 females ages 18 and older there were 98.6 males.

The Census Bureau's 2006–2010 American Community Survey showed that (in 2010 inflation-adjusted dollars) median household income was $73,750 (with a margin of error of +/− $8,449) and the median family income was $96,071 (+/− $15,669). Males had a median income of $62,071 (+/− $9,210) versus $41,875 (+/− $7,589) for females. The per capita income for the borough was $40,921 (+/− $9,604). About 2.5% of families and 2.4% of the population were below the poverty line, including none of those under age 18 and 2.2% of those age 65 or over.

=== 2000 census ===
As of the 2000 U.S. census, there were 1,825 people, 693 households, and 503 families residing in the township. The population density was 42.8 inhabitants per square mile (16.5/km^{2}). There were 907 housing units at an average density of 21.3 per square mile (8.2/km^{2}). The racial makeup of the township was 97.86% White, 0.38% African American, 0.16% Native American, 0.44% Asian, 0.11% Pacific Islander, 0.05% from other races, and 0.99% from two or more races. Hispanic or Latino of any race were 1.32% of the population.

There were 793 households, out of which 35.2% had children under the age of 18 living with them, 62.9% were married couples living together, 5.9% had a female householder with no husband present, and 27.3% were non-families. 22.8% of all households were made up of individuals, and 9.7% had someone living alone who was 65 years of age or older. The average household size was 2.63 and the average family size was 3.12.

In the township, the population was spread out, with 25.2% under the age of 18, 6.0% from 18 to 24, 28.5% from 25 to 44, 26.9% from 45 to 64, and 13.4% who were 65 years of age or older. The median age was 40 years. For every 100 females, there were 101.4 males. For every 100 females age 18 and over, there were 99.6 males.

The median income for a household in the township was $55,667, and the median income for a family was $65,774. Males had a median income of $46,167 versus $30,660 for females. The per capita income for the township was $23,854. About 3.6% of families and 5.4% of the population were below the poverty line, including 6.8% of those under age 18 and 6.4% of those age 65 or over.

== Parks and recreation ==
- Brau Kettle karst
- Delaware Water Gap National Recreation Area and Stokes State Forest cover more than two-thirds of the township
- Peters Valley School of Craft

== Government ==
=== Local government ===
Sandyston Township is governed under the township form of New Jersey municipal government, one of 141 municipalities (of the 564) statewide that use this form, the second-most commonly used form of government in the state. The governing body is comprised of the three-person Township Committee, whose members are elected directly by the voters in partisan elections to serve three-year terms of office on a staggered basis, with one seat coming up for election each year as part of the November general election. At an annual reorganization meeting, the Township Committee selects one of its members to serve as Mayor and another as Deputy Mayor.

As of 2024, members of the Sandyston Township Committee are Mayor George B. Harper Jr. (R, term on committee ends December 31, 2026; term as mayor ends 2024), Deputy Mayor Kamala M. "Kammy" Hull (R, term on committee ends 2025; term as deputy mayor ends 2024) and Ronald E. Green (R, 2024).

In January 2016, the Township Committee selected Kamala "Kammy" Hull from three names nominated by the Republican municipal committee to fill the seat expiring in December 2016 that had been held by William J. Leppert until his resignation effective the previous month; Hull will serve on an interim basis until the November 2016 general election, when voters will select a candidate to serve the balance of the term of office.

=== Federal, state and county representation ===
Sandyston Township is located in the 5th Congressional District and is part of New Jersey's 24th state legislative district.

For the 119th United States Congress, New Jersey's 5th congressional district is represented by Josh Gottheimer (D, Wyckoff). New Jersey is represented in the United States Senate by Democrats Cory Booker (Newark, term ends 2027) and Andy Kim (Moorestown, term ends 2031).

For the 2026–2027 session, the 24th legislative district of the New Jersey Legislature is represented in the State Senate by Parker Space (R, Wantage Township) and in the General Assembly by Dawn Fantasia (R, Franklin) and Mike Inganamort (R, Chester Township).

Sussex County is governed by a Board of County Commissioners whose five members are elected at-large in partisan elections on a staggered basis, with either one or two seats coming up for election each year. At an annual reorganization meeting held in the beginning of January, the board selects a Commissioner Director and Deputy Director from among its members, with day-to-day supervision of the operation of the county delegated to a County Administrator. As of 2025, Sussex County's Commissioners are Director Jill Space (R, Wantage Township, 2025), Deputy Director Chris Carney (R, Frankford Township, 2027), Jack DeGroot (R, Sussex, 2026), William Hayden (I, Branchville, 2025) and Alan Henderson (R, Lafayette Township, 2027).

Constitutional officers elected on a countywide basis are Clerk Jeffrey M. Parrott (R, Wantage Township, 2026), Sheriff Michael F. Strada (R, Hampton Township, 2025) and Surrogate Gary R. Chiusano (R, Frankford Township, 2028).

=== Politics ===
As of March 2011, there were a total of 1,349 registered voters in Sandyston Township, of which 193 (14.3% vs. 16.5% countywide) were registered as Democrats, 662 (49.1% vs. 39.3%) were registered as Republicans and 492 (36.5% vs. 44.1%) were registered as Unaffiliated. There were 2 voters registered as either Libertarians or Greens. Among the township's 2010 census population, 67.5% (vs. 65.8% in Sussex County) were registered to vote, including 87.1% of those ages 18 and over (vs. 86.5% countywide).

Gubernatorial election results for Sandyston Township
Year	Republican		Democratic		Third party(ies)	
Year	No.	%	No.	%	No.	%
2025	644	66.60%	321	33.20%	2	0.21%
2021	595	71.60%	225	27.08%	11	1.32%
2017	443	65.63%	203	30.07%	29	4.30%
2013	496	73.48%	156	23.11%	23	3.41%
2009	475	66.06%	157	21.84%	87	12.10%
2005	374	63.71%	176	29.98%	37	6.30%

In the 2012 presidential election, Republican Mitt Romney received 661 votes (65.1% vs. 59.4% countywide), ahead of Democrat Barack Obama with 327 votes (32.2% vs. 38.2%) and other candidates with 24 votes (2.4% vs. 2.1%), among the 1,015 ballots cast by the township's 1,392 registered voters, for a turnout of 72.9% (vs. 68.3% in Sussex County). In the 2008 presidential election, Republican John McCain received 655 votes (64.0% vs. 59.2% countywide), ahead of Democrat Barack Obama with 353 votes (34.5% vs. 38.7%) and other candidates with 9 votes (0.9% vs. 1.5%), among the 1,024 ballots cast by the township's 1,328 registered voters, for a turnout of 77.1% (vs. 76.9% in Sussex County). In the 2004 presidential election, Republican George W. Bush received 638 votes (67.7% vs. 63.9% countywide), ahead of Democrat John Kerry with 291 votes (30.9% vs. 34.4%) and other candidates with 12 votes (1.3% vs. 1.3%), among the 943 ballots cast by the township's 1,163 registered voters, for a turnout of 81.1% (vs. 77.7% in the whole county).

United States presidential election results for Sandyston Township 2024 2020 2016 2012 2008 2004
Year	Republican		Democratic		Third party(ies)	
Year	No.	%	No.	%	No.	%
2024	799	67.26%	364	30.64%	25	2.10%
2020	774	63.29%	416	34.01%	33	2.70%
2016	747	68.66%	282	25.92%	59	5.42%
2012	661	65.32%	327	32.31%	24	2.37%
2008	655	64.41%	353	34.71%	9	0.88%
2004	638	67.80%	291	30.92%	12	1.28%

In the 2013 gubernatorial election, Republican Chris Christie received 73.5% of the vote (496 cast), ahead of Democrat Barbara Buono with 23.1% (156 votes), and other candidates with 3.4% (23 votes), among the 678 ballots cast by the township's 1,423 registered voters (3 ballots were spoiled), for a turnout of 47.6%. In the 2009 gubernatorial election, Republican Chris Christie received 475 votes (65.6% vs. 63.3% countywide), ahead of Democrat Jon Corzine with 157 votes (21.7% vs. 25.7%), Independent Chris Daggett with 77 votes (10.6% vs. 9.1%) and other candidates with 10 votes (1.4% vs. 1.3%), among the 724 ballots cast by the township's 1,303 registered voters, yielding a 55.6% turnout (vs. 52.3% in the county).

United States Senate election results for Sandyston Township1
Year	Republican		Democratic		Third party(ies)	
Year	No.	%	No.	%	No.	%
2024	803	68.34%	340	28.94%	32	2.72%
2018	615	66.63%	261	28.28%	47	5.09%
2012	610	62.24%	311	31.73%	59	6.02%
2006	393	62.78%	202	32.27%	31	4.95%

United States Senate election results for Sandyston Township2
Year	Republican		Democratic		Third party(ies)	
Year	No.	%	No.	%	No.	%
2020	767	63.13%	417	34.32%	31	2.55%
2014	454	63.50%	234	32.73%	27	3.78%
2013	320	71.59%	122	27.29%	5	1.12%
2008	617	61.82%	335	33.57%	46	4.61%

== Education ==
Public school students in kindergarten through sixth grade attend the schools of the Sandyston-Walpack Consolidated School District, together with students from Walpack Township. The school is located in the Layton section of Sandyston Township. As of the 2018–19 school year, the district, comprised of one school, had an enrollment of 138 students and 16.9 classroom teachers (on an FTE basis), for a student–teacher ratio of 8.2:1. In the 2016–17 school year, Sandyston-Walpack had the 26th smallest enrollment of any school district in the state, with 149 students.

Students in seventh through twelfth grade from Sandyston and Walpack Townships for public school attend Kittatinny Regional High School located in Hampton Township, which also serves students who reside in Fredon Township and Stillwater Township. The high school is located on a 96-acre (39 ha) campus in Hampton Township, about seven minutes outside of the county seat of Newton. Kittatinny Regional High School was recognized as a National Blue Ribbon School of Excellence in 1997–1998. As of the 2018–19 school year, the high school had an enrollment of 941 students and 97.5 classroom teachers (on an FTE basis), for a student–teacher ratio of 9.7:1.

== Transportation ==
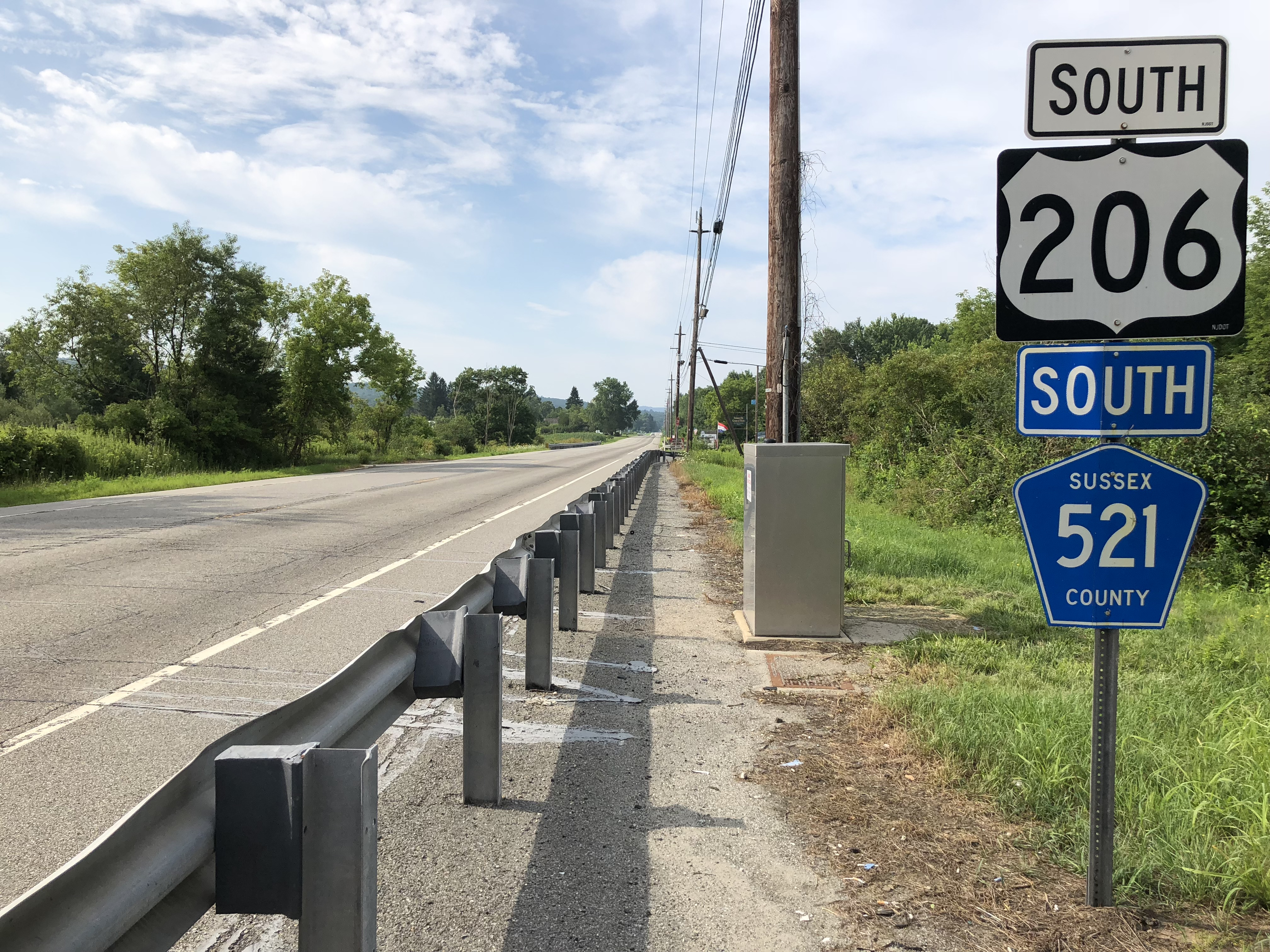
U.S. Route 206 and County Route 521 southbound in Sandyston Township

As of May 2010, the township had a total of 52.47 miles (84.44 km) of roadways, of which 28.98 miles (46.64 km) were maintained by the municipality, 16.22 miles (26.10 km) by Sussex County and 7.27 miles (11.70 km) by the New Jersey Department of Transportation.

U.S. Route 206 bisects the township, concurrent with County Route 521. The Dingman's Ferry Bridge, one of the last privately owned toll bridges on the Delaware River and one of the last few in the United States, carries two lanes of PA 739 and NJ County Route 560, connecting to Delaware Township, Pike County, Pennsylvania.

== Notable people ==
People who were born in, residents of, or otherwise closely associated with Sandyston Township include:

- George B. Harper (1918–1988), politician who served in the New Jersey Senate from 1954 to 1964
- Harry Harper (1895–1963), pitcher who played in the major leagues for four different teams
- Ernest L. Hettich (1897–1973), scholar of classics
- Bill Sienkiewicz (born 1958), artist known for his work in comic books, particularly for Marvel Comics' New Mutants, Moon Knight, and Elektra: Assassin
