= Wallpack Valley =

Valley in New Jersey, United States

Coordinates: 41.1197°N 74.9261°W

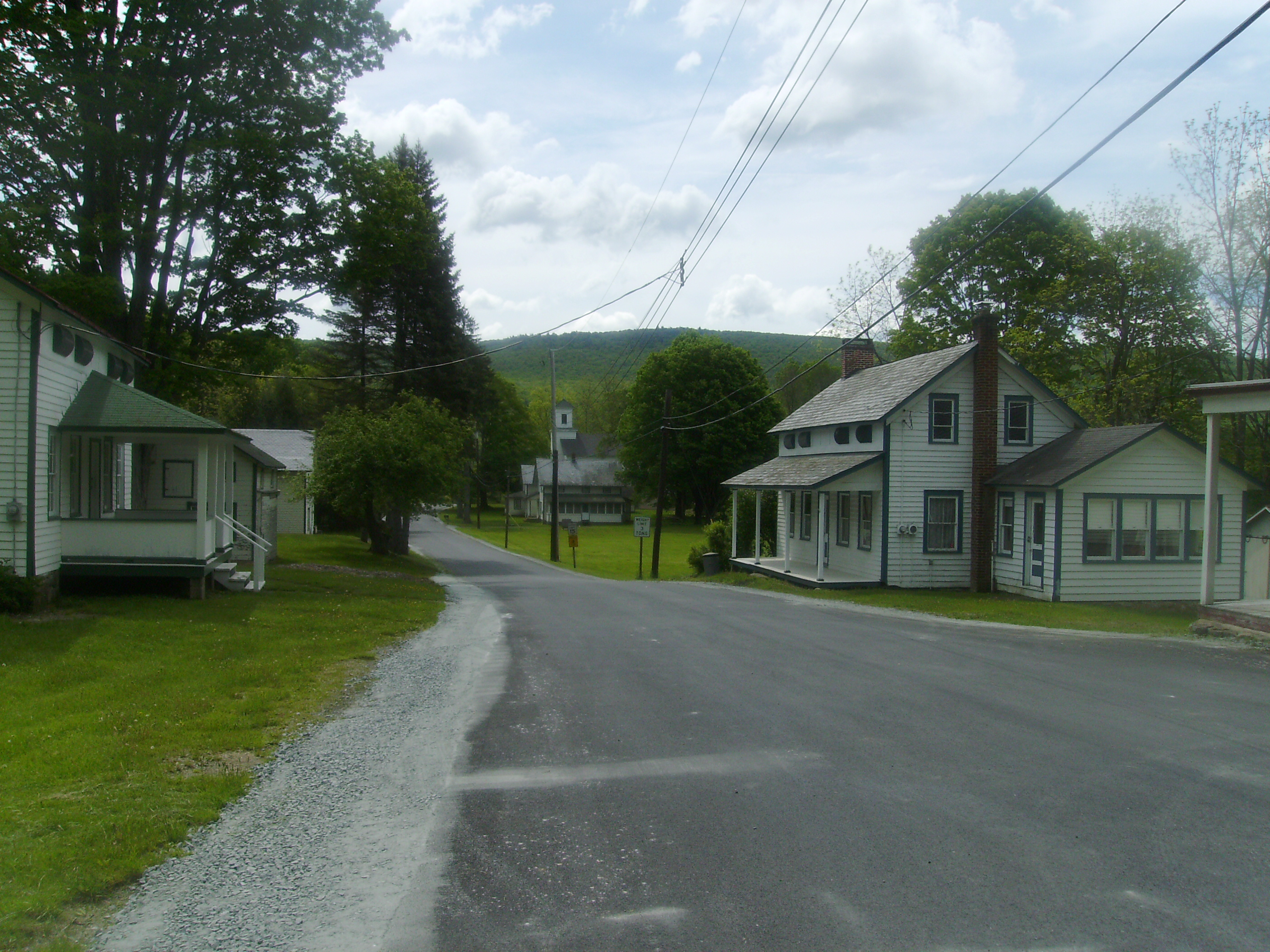
Wallpack Center, New Jersey in Walpack Township is a small village, now a Historic District in the Delaware Water Gap National Recreation Area in the middle of the Walpack Valley. Kittatinny Mountain is in the background.

Wallpack Valley (or Walpack Valley) is a valley located in Sussex County in northwestern New Jersey formed by Wallpack Ridge (elevation 600–900 feet) on the west, and Kittatinny Mountain (1400–1800 feet) on the east. Wallpack Ridge separates the Wallpack Valley from the valley of the Delaware River (also known as the Minisink or Minisink Valley), and contains the watershed of the Flat Brook and its main tributaries Big Flat Brook and Little Flat Brook. It is a narrow valley, roughly 25 miles (40 km) in length running from Montague Township south of Port Jervis, New York to the Walpack Bend in the Delaware River near Flatbrookville in Walpack Township where the Flat Brook enters the Delaware at 300 feet above sea level.

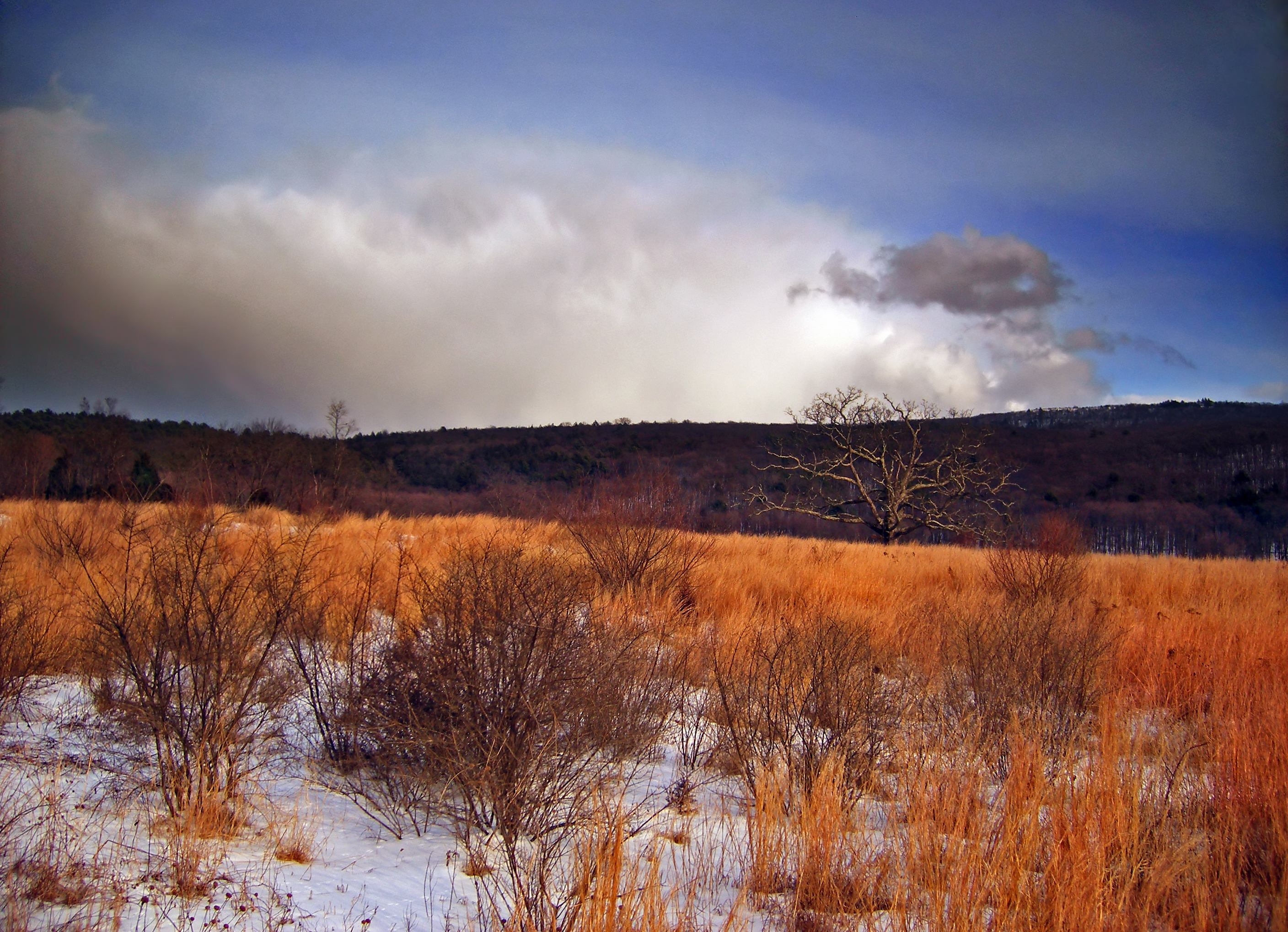
Meadow in the Walpack Valley facing the west side of Kittatinny Mountain

Haneys Mill is a section of Walpack. A grist mill was built there around 1860. It appears on the Sussex County wall map of that year with a nearby sawmill, a lime kiln, and residences of C. Haney, J.W. Fuller and B.D. Fuller. Serving at various times as a gristmill, a sawmill and a cidermill, the last operator was Jake Haney. The mid-nineteenth century farmhouse of the Haney family also stood nearby. Some of the scenes from the 1933 Ford Motor Company promotional film "These Thirty Years" were filmed here. In the movie, the place was known as the Haines farm; across the road in front of the house were the barns where the auction scene was filmed.

After the floods in the 1950s, which raised the water of the Delaware above the level of the roads alongside it, a controversial project to build a hydroelectric dam and reservoir on the Delaware River in the 1950s and 1960s led to government's seizure of land in northwestern New Jersey and northeastern Pennsylvania under the authority of the U.S. Army Corps of Engineers. The construction of the dam would have created a lake reservoir that would have flooded the Walpack Valley. For political and geological reasons, the dam project was deauthorized and the land transferred to the management of the National Park Service for the establishment of a National Recreation Area. Currently, Wallpack Ridge is located in the Delaware Water Gap National Recreation Area that was established by the National Park Service in 1978.
