= Stokes State Forest =

State park in Sussex County, New Jersey

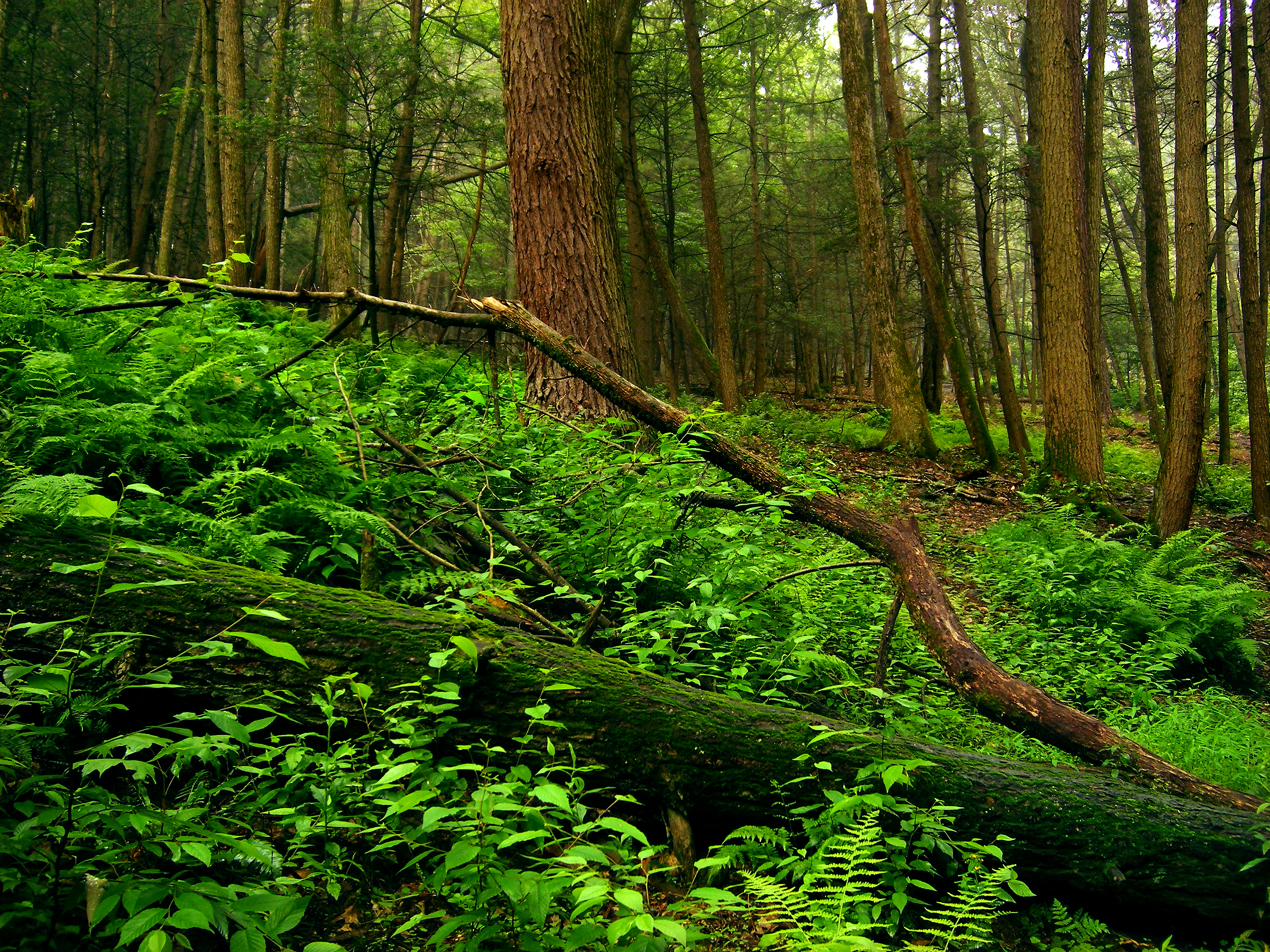
- Stokes State Forest, seen in 2006

- Location within New Jersey Location within the United States
- Location: Sussex County
- Coordinates: 41°11′04″N 74°47′50″W
- Area: 16,447-acre (66.56 km^{2})
- Opened: 1917
- Operator: New Jersey Division of Parks and Forestry
- Website: Official website

Stokes State Forest is a state park located in Sandyston, Montague and Frankford in Sussex County, New Jersey, United States. Stokes comprises 16,447 acres (66.56 km^{2}) of mountainous woods in the Kittatinny Mountains, extending from the southern boundary of High Point State Park southwestward to the eastern boundary of the Delaware Water Gap National Recreation Area. The park is operated and maintained by the New Jersey Division of Parks and Forestry.

== History ==
Stokes State Forest was created in 1907 when Governor Edward Stokes donated 500 acres (2.0 km^{2}) of land on Kittatinny Mountains and the State of New Jersey purchased 5,432 acres (21.98 km^{2}) of land. Due to the governor's generous donation, the forest was named Stokes State forest. The forest started with 5,932 acres (24.01 km^{2}) of land and through the years, additional purchases were made to bring the forest to over 16,000 acres (65 km^{2}). Trails through the forest were made in the 1930s by the Civilian Conservation Corps as well as white pine trees being planted.

During the 19th century the forests in New Jersey were cut down for farming and for lumber. Stokes was created to preserve the forests on the Kittatinny Mountains.

== Geology ==
Around five hundred million years ago, an arcuate chain of volcanic islands collided with proto-North America. The North American plate was subducted under the chain of islands. The islands overrode the edge of North America, creating the Highlands and Kittatinny Valley which is of the Ordovician Martinsburg Shale. Quartz and the sedimentary conglomerate was transported to an inland sea, which was over part of the Martinsburg shale. The quartz was deposited over the Martinsburg shale.

Then around four hundred million years ago a small continent, long and thin, collided with proto-North America, compressing the bedrock. The Kittatinny Mountains were created due to folding and faulting of the Silurian Shawangunk conglomerate which is made of quartz. This stone was in a shallow sea above the Martinsburg shale when folding occurred, producing heat in which the quartz bent. Then the quartz was cemented together with other small stones from silica. Due to the hardness of the stone, this makes the mountain highly resistant to weathering.

Over millions of years, the mountain weathered from wind, rain, snow and ice.

The Wisconsin Glacier covered Stokes State Forest and the Kittatinny Mountains from 21,000 BC to 13,000 BC. The glacier left end moraines, kettle holes and periglacial rock fields.

The Big Flat Brook is a shallow stream which starts in the mountain swamp of Steam Mill and travels in a southwesterly direction. It empties into the Delaware River near Flatbrookville. This stream is stocked by the New Jersey Fish and Game with rainbow trout and brown trout. This stream is considered one of the premier fishing streams in the state of New Jersey.

In the 1880s, John Snook dug a mine and extracted silver ore. He was paid well for the ore and the silver quickly ran out. This mine, which is filled with water today, is not far from the Kittle Field picnic area or about a mile and a half north of the forest office.

== Flora and fauna ==
Stokes forest is in the northern deciduous forest in the north eastern Appalachians composed of various oaks, hickories, maples, as well as birch, chestnuts, beech, sycamore, cherry, walnut, ash, elm, and other hardwood tree species. Rhododendron, mountain laurel, high and low bush blueberries, grow in the forest as well as various mosses and ferns. Big game animals such as white tailed deer and bear inhabit the forest. Also there is beaver, mink, raccoons, possums, skunks, chipmunks, gray and red squirrels, gray fox, as well as the Adirondack fisher. There is also eastern coyote and bobcat.

== Points of interest ==
=== Sunrise Mountain ===
Sunrise Mountain is part of the Kittatinny Mountains which goes from the New York State Line to the Delaware Water Gap. This mountain was formed during the Silurian period and made of the Shawangunk conglomerate which is made of quartz. Bedrock exposure of the Shawangunk conglomerate can be seen along the trail.

The pavilion at the top of the peak makes a great place to picnic. To make traveling to Sunrise more interesting, one can look for the New Jersey shaped rock. The mountain is the second highest point in New Jersey, being 1,653 feet (504 m) above sea level. Hikers are amazed with the view. There is a USGS marker at the top of the mountain which gives the elevation. To get there, the hiking stretch is a quarter of a mile from a parking lot. Much of Sussex County can be seen from the summit of the mountain. From the eastern side of the mountain, one can view the Kittatinny Valley and the Highlands. From the western side, the Delaware Valley and the Port Jervis trough can be seen. From the top of Sunrise Mountain you can see three states, New Jersey, New York, and Pennsylvania.

The Appalachian Trail follows the ridge-line of the Kittatinny Mountains. It is marked with short white stripes known as blazes on trees.

=== Stony Lake ===
Stony Lake is an eight-acre lake that has a beach surrounded by picnic tables, pavilions, showers, dressing rooms, a new bathroom with flushing toilets. The beach is host to many swimmers during the months of July and August. The lake has life guards during swimming hours. The lake also offers many spots to fish. One can explore the forest around the lake. There are admission prices to the lake. There are also many playgrounds such as Kittle Field to take young children to.

=== Lake Ocquittunk ===
Lake Ocquittunk is a 6-acre (24,000 m^{2}) lake shape like a U, located in Stokes State Forest. There are eleven cabins around the lake that can be rented. The N.J. Fish and game stocks the lake with rainbow and brown trout three times a year. There is a small section of the lake on the other side of the road, that runs next to the lake. Perch, bass, and pickerel also inhabit the lake. A small stream runs into the lake and exits the lake.

=== Tillman Ravine ===
Tillman Ravine Natural Area is a 525 acres (2.12 km^{2}) section of coniferous and deciduous forest surrounding Tillman Brook. Tillman Brook starts as a spring, which flows year round. An old-growth forest of 25 acres (0.10 km^{2}) containing eastern hemlock and hardwoods follows part of the ravine. Several trails run through this area, providing views of waterfalls, pools, and rock formations. Tillman Ravine is a habitat for the barred owl and other endangered species.

The ravine was created when the Wisconsin glacier melted and the melt water created a stream by traveling through the weaknesses of the bedrock of the Kittatinny Mountains. Tillman Creek joins the Flat Brook in the Delaware Water Gap National Recreation Area two-miles south of the hamlet of Wallpack Center in Walpack Township.

=== School of Conservation ===
The New Jersey School of Conservation. The New Jersey School of Conservation (NJSOC) is an Environmental Education center located in Stokes State Forest in Sussex County, New Jersey. It is currently under the management of the Friends of the New Jersey School of Conservation, through an agreement with the New Jersey Department of Environmental Protection.[1] The NJSOC was founded in 1949, and occupies facilities in Stokes State Forest built by the Civilian Conservation Corps.

== See also ==
- List of New Jersey state parks
