= List of fly fishing waters in Europe =

The articles listed below focus on specific European bodies of water, such as seas, lakes, and rivers that are notable fly fishing destinations and provide substantial coverage of fly fishing for the species found there.

== Austria ==
Rivers

- Traun River

== Belgium ==
Rivers

- Ourthe

== Bosnia and Herzegovina ==
Rivers

- Vrelo Bosne
- Neretva
- Rakitnica
- Buna River
- Bunica
- Bregava
- Trebižat River
- Drina
- Sutjeska
- Tara
- Piva
- Pliva
- Janj River
- Sana River
- Ribnik River
- Sanica River
- Una
- Unac River
- Klokot River
- Krušnica River

Mountain Lakes

- Šatorsko Lake
- Boračko Lake

== Great Britain ==
Rivers

- River Itchen
- River Test
- River Usk
- River Wylye
- River Avon-Wiltshire/Hampshire
- River Kennet
- River Tamar
- River Don-Aberdeenshire

Small Still Waters

- Amwell Magna Fishery
- Lechlade & Bushyleaze Trout Fishery
- Chalk Springs
- Lenches Lakes
- Dever Springs
- Tavistock Trout Fishery
- Tree Meadow Trout Fishery

Reservoirs

- Blagdon Lake
- Carsington Water
- Draycote Water
- Eyebrook Reservoir
- Grafham Water
- Stithians
- Thornton Reservoir

== Hungary ==
- Balaton
- Lake Tisza
- Gaja patak
- Szinva
- Garadna
- Jósva
- Tolcsva
- Bán patak
- Zala river

== Ireland ==
- River Erne
- River Suir
- River Nore
- River Barrow
- River Slaney
- River Boro
- River Bann
- Owenavorragh River
- Derry River
- Urrin River
- Sow
- River Fergus
- Camcor River
- Lough Derg
- Lough Ree
- Lough Ennell
- Lough Owel
- Lough Sheelin
- Lough Derravaragh
- Lough O'Flynn
- Pallas Lake
- Munster Backwater
- River Lee
- River Bandon
- River Arigideen
- Sullane River
- River Blackwater
- Waterville Lakes and System
- Caragh Lakes and System
- Laune, Flesk and Killarney Lakes

== Spain ==
- River Órbigo
- River Luna
- River Bernesga
- River Porma
- River Esla
- River Omaña
- River Torio
- River Curueño
- River Carrión
- River Pisuerga
- River Veral
- River Aragón
- River Aragón Subordan
- River Vellós
- River Ara
- River Cinca
- River Escá
- River Gállego
- River Pilueña
- River Tajo
- River Gallo
- River Tormes
- River Najerilla
- River Saja
- River Nansa
- River Besaya
- River Tavascan
- River Cares
- River Narcea
- River Sella
- River Piloña
- River Trubia
- River Caudal
- River Jucar
- River Guadalquivir
- River Segura
- River Mundo

== Sweden ==
Miekak

== Norway ==
Rivers

- Tana
- Gaula
- Orkla
- Namsen
- Altaelva
- Renaelva
- Hemsila
- Nidelva
- Trysilelva
- Glåma
- Nea
- Tya

== Slovenia ==
- river Soca
- Sava Bohinjka
- Sava Dolinka
- river Savinja
- river Dreta
- river Krka
- Vipava

== See also ==
List of fly fishing waters in North America
