= Flatbrookville, New Jersey =

Populated place in Sussex County, New Jersey, US

- Unincorporated community
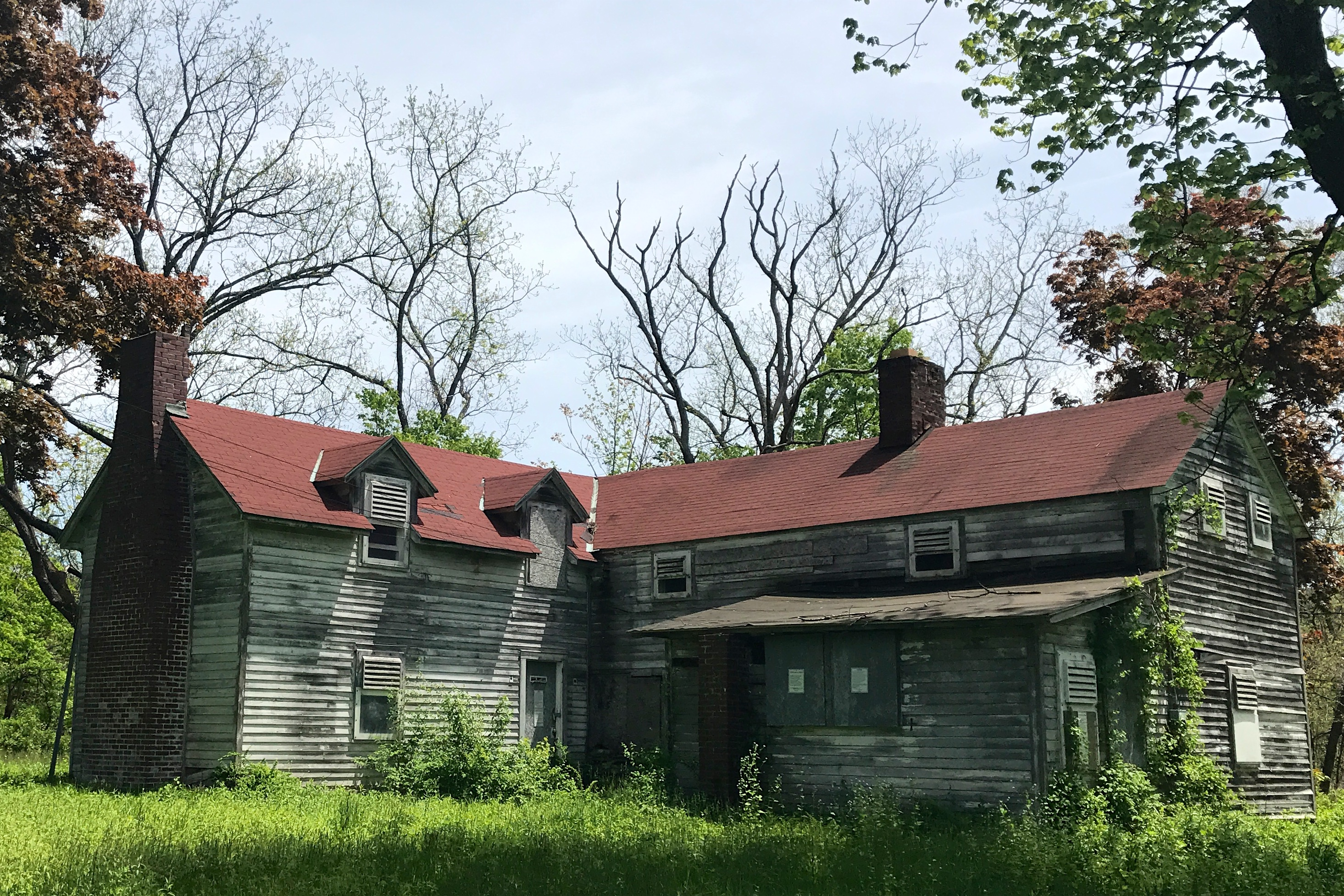
- Decker Ferry House

- Location within Sussex County. Inset: Location of Sussex County within New Jersey. Flatbrookville (New Jersey) Flatbrookville (the United States)
- Coordinates: 41°06′01″N 74°57′49″W
- Country: United States
- State: New Jersey
- County: Sussex
- Township: Walpack
- Named after: Flat Brook
- Elevation: 348 ft (106 m)
- GNIS feature ID: 876381

Flatbrookville is an unincorporated community located along Old Mine Road within Walpack Township, in Sussex County, in the U.S. state of New Jersey. It is named after the Flat Brook, a tributary of the Delaware River, which flows through the community. The area is now part of the Delaware Water Gap National Recreation Area.

== History ==
The Decker Ferry House, built c. 1800, and the Rosenkrans Ferry House, also known as the Smith-Rosenkrans House, built c. 1807, provided ferry service across the Delaware River at the Walpack Bend. Both are contributing properties of the Old Mine Road Historic District.
