= Brau Kettle =

Coordinates: 41.140°N 74.913°W

The Brau Kettle is a geological feature known as a karst that is located along the Wallpack Ridge in the Delaware Water Gap National Recreation Area in Sandyston Township, New Jersey. Its name derives from the Dutch for "brewing kettle" or "boiling kettle" which describes how water suddenly bubbles up from the ground. This site is referenced in early French Jesuit and Dutch colonial manuscripts as a landmark near which colonial traders exchanged goods with the Munsee and other local Native American tribes. According to the New Jersey Geological Survey, the feature looks like a sinkhole in dry times during the year. It is known to flow at random, after periods of precipitation, and is thought to be fed by a sinking stream that vanishes in the forest roughly 1,800 feet away.

== See also ==
- Delaware Water Gap National Recreation Area
- Geology of New Jersey
- Sussex County, New Jersey
