= High Point State Park =

State park in New Jersey

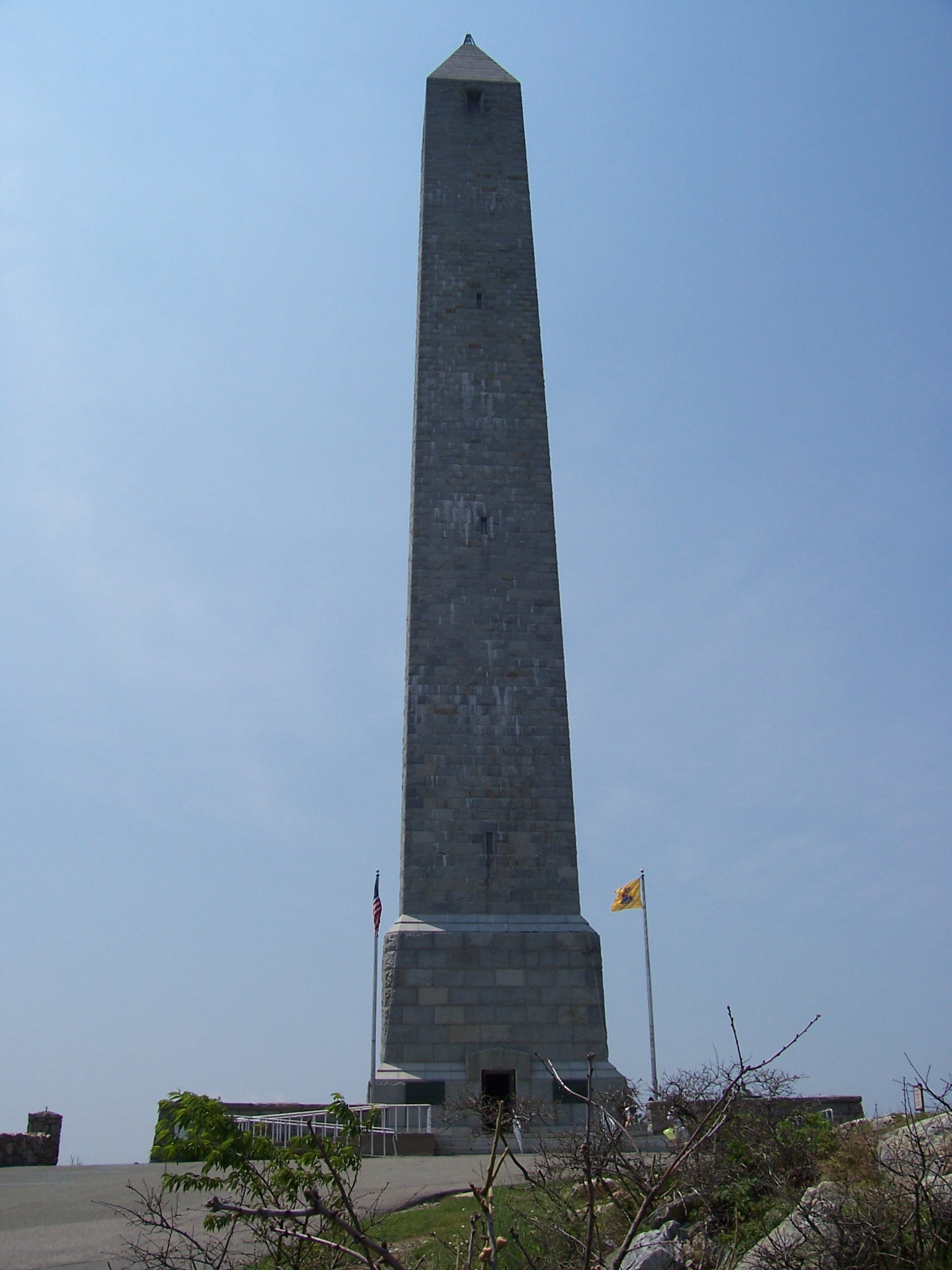
- High Point Monument

- Location within New Jersey Location within the United States Location within North America Location within Earth
- Location: Wantage Township and Montague Township, Sussex County, New Jersey
- Nearest city: Port Jervis, New York
- Coordinates: 41°17′N 74°41′W
- Area: 15,413 acres (62.37 km^{2})
- Established: 1923
- Administrator: New Jersey Division of Parks and Forestry
- Website: Official website

High Point State Park is a state park straddling the border of Wantage Township and Montague Township in Sussex County, within the Skylands Region of northwestern New Jersey, United States, near the border with New York State and Pennsylvania. The park covers 15,413 acres (62.37 km^{2}). Part of the Kittatinny Mountains, the highest point in the state of New Jersey, the aptly named High Point, sits in the northern reaches of the park, at elevation 1,803 feet (550 m). Route 23 skirts the park and provides access for visitors from the New Jersey suburbs and from points in New York. The park is administered by the New Jersey Division of Parks and Forestry.

As of the 2023 season, entrance to the park is free. Seasonal regulations for the park's northern trail system require visitors to obtain a specific trail pass from December 1 through April 1 when the Cross-Country Ski Center is operational, though the Appalachian Trail remains exempt for foot travel.

High Point Monument, built at the summit, offers views of farmland and forest, hills and valleys in three states, out to the Delaware Water Gap National Recreation Area, where the Delaware River separates the ridges of New Jersey from those of Pennsylvania. High Point offers trails for hiking and cross-country skiing and areas for camping and fishing.

The land for High Point State Park, donated by Colonel Anthony R. and Susie Dryden Kuser, was dedicated as a park in 1923. The pleasant landscaping was designed by the Olmsted Brothers of Boston, a prominent landscape architectural firm of that time. The brothers were the sons of Frederick Law Olmsted, who designed Central Park.

To the south, the Appalachian Trail follows a rocky ridge which has views of the valleys and mountains surrounding the area. To the north, the trail drops off the ridge through hemlock gorges into former agricultural fields with a view of the surrounding countryside and the High Point Monument in the distance.

== High Point Monument ==
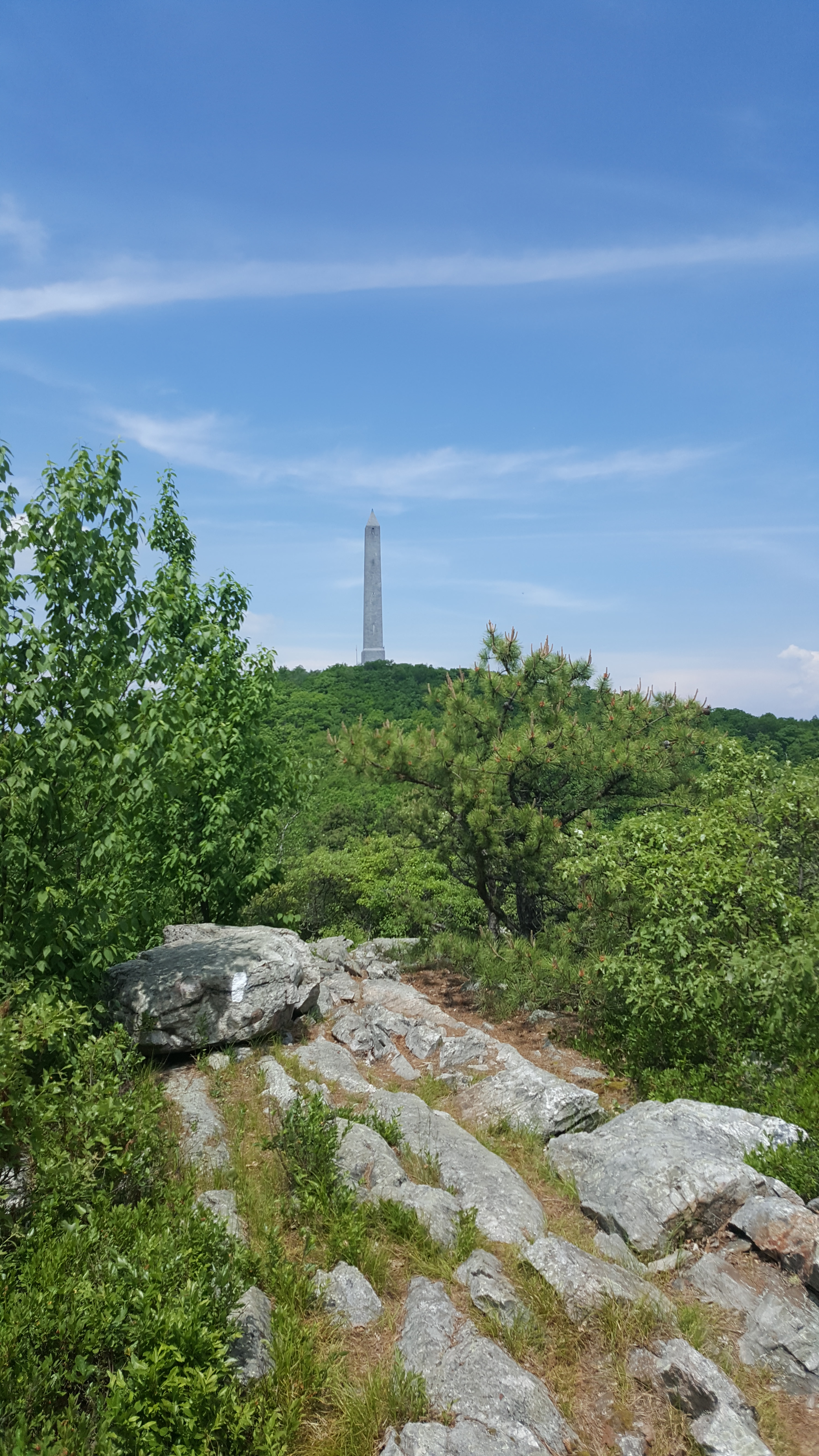
High Point Monument from the Appalachian Trail

Interactive map of High Point State Park, New Jersey

The monument was built to honor war veterans, through the generosity of the Kusers. Construction began in 1928 and completed in 1930. At the top of the 220 feet (67 m) structure (the base is 34 square feet (3.2 m^{2})), observers have views of the ridges of the Pocono Mountains toward the west, the Catskill Mountains to the north and the Wallkill River Valley in the southeast. At the top of New Jersey's tallest knob, the Monument is an obelisk monument similar to other war monuments, such as the one located on Breed's Hill in Massachusetts.
