= High Point (New Jersey) =

Mountain peak in New Jersey, U.S.

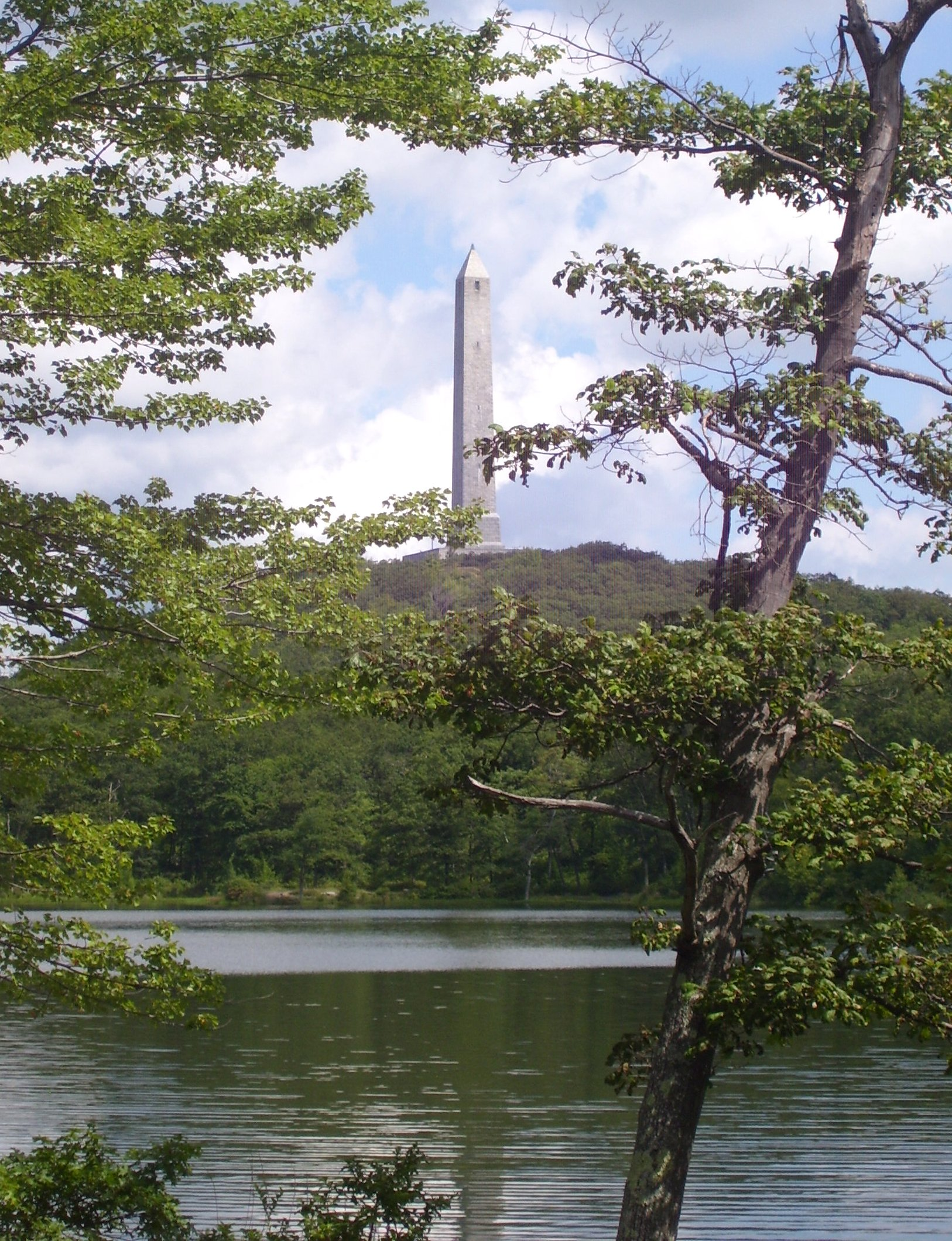
- High Point Monument and Lake Marcia

Highest point
- Elevation: 1,804 ft (550 m) NAVD 88
- Prominence: 883 ft (269 m)
- Listing: U.S. state high point 40th
- Coordinates: 41°19′15″N 74°39′42″W

Geography
- Location within Sussex County, New Jersey
- Location: Wantage Township and Montague Township, Sussex County, New Jersey
- Parent range: Kittatinny Mountains, Appalachians

Climbing
- Easiest route: A paved 2-lane roadway ascends directly to the summit

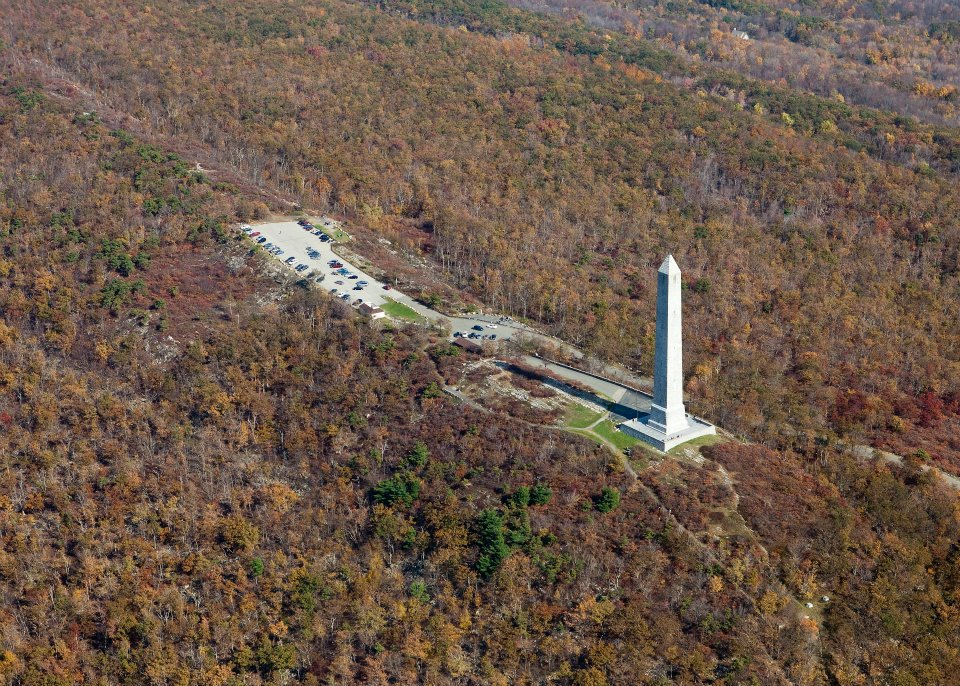
Aerial photo of High Point State Park

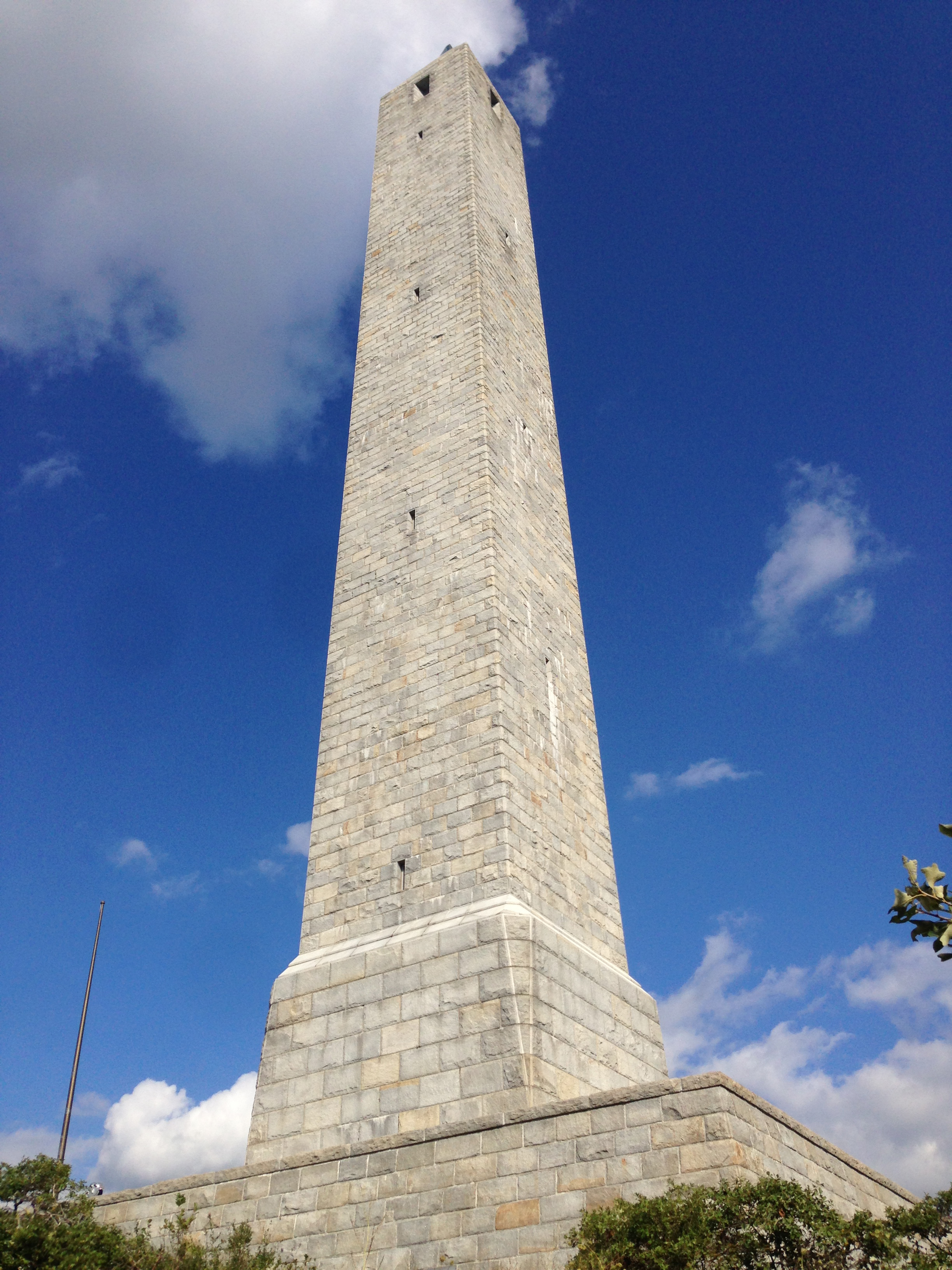
High Point Monument, designed by Marion Sims Wyeth

High Point is a mountain peak within High Point State Park on the border of Wantage Township and Montague Township, Sussex County in the U.S. state of New Jersey. Located in the portion of the state known as the Skylands, it is the highest elevation in the state, with a peak elevation of 1,803 feet (550 m). The closest city is Port Jervis, New York, which lies to the northwest. Besides being the highest peak in New Jersey, High Point is also the highest peak of the Kittatinny Mountains. Three states – New Jersey, New York, and Pennsylvania – can be seen from the summit.

At the peak is the High Point Monument, a 220-foot (67 m) obelisk, built in 1930 as a war memorial.

== High Point State Park ==
The mountain is in the 14,193 acres (57.44 km^{2}) High Point State Park. Route 23 skirts the park and carries visitors from the New Jersey suburbs and from points in New York State. The park is administered by the New Jersey Division of Parks and Forestry.

As of the 2026 season, park entry was free.

The land for High Point State Park, donated by Colonel Anthony R. and Susie Dryden Kuser of Bernardsville, New Jersey, was dedicated as a park in 1923. The pleasant landscaping was designed by the Olmsted Brothers of Boston, a prominent landscape architectural firm run by the sons of Central Park designer Frederick Law Olmsted.

To the south the Appalachian Trail follows a rocky ridge which offers many scenic views of the valleys and mountains surrounding the area. To the north, the trail drops off the ridge through hemlock gorges into former agricultural fields with a view of the surrounding countryside and the High Point Monument in the distance.

During the winter, portions of the parks trails are used for cross-country skiing.

== War veterans monument ==
The Monument on High Point was built by Kuser to honor war veterans. Master mason Michael Maddaluna began construction of the 220-foot (67 m) tower – which has a base which is 34 square feet (3.2 m^{2}) – in 1928 and completed it in 1930. The outside is made of New Hampshire granite and also Shawangunk quartz. There are four small windows through which observers have a view of the ridges of the Pocono Mountains toward the west, the Catskill Mountains to the north and the Wallkill River Valley in the southeast. The Monument is an obelisk monument similar to other war monuments, such as the one on Bunker Hill in Massachusetts. The Monument has 291 steps from the base to the highest viewing platform.

Plans were made to close the park as of July 1, 2008, under Gov. Jon Corzine's budget plan for 2009. Veterans groups, who have held an annual memorial at the site, expressed their opposition to the proposal, which was ultimately removed from the final budget.

== Summit panorama at ground level ==
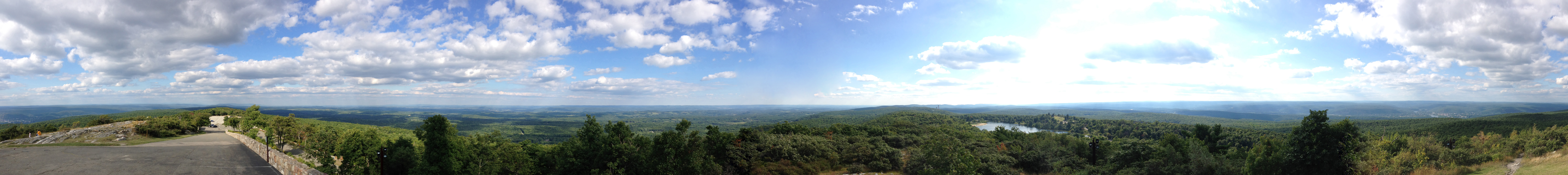
View from High Point

== See also ==
- National Register of Historic Places listings in Sussex County, New Jersey
- Outline of New Jersey
- Index of New Jersey-related articles
- List of U.S. states by elevation
