= Kittatinny Mountain =

Ridge in northwestern New Jersey

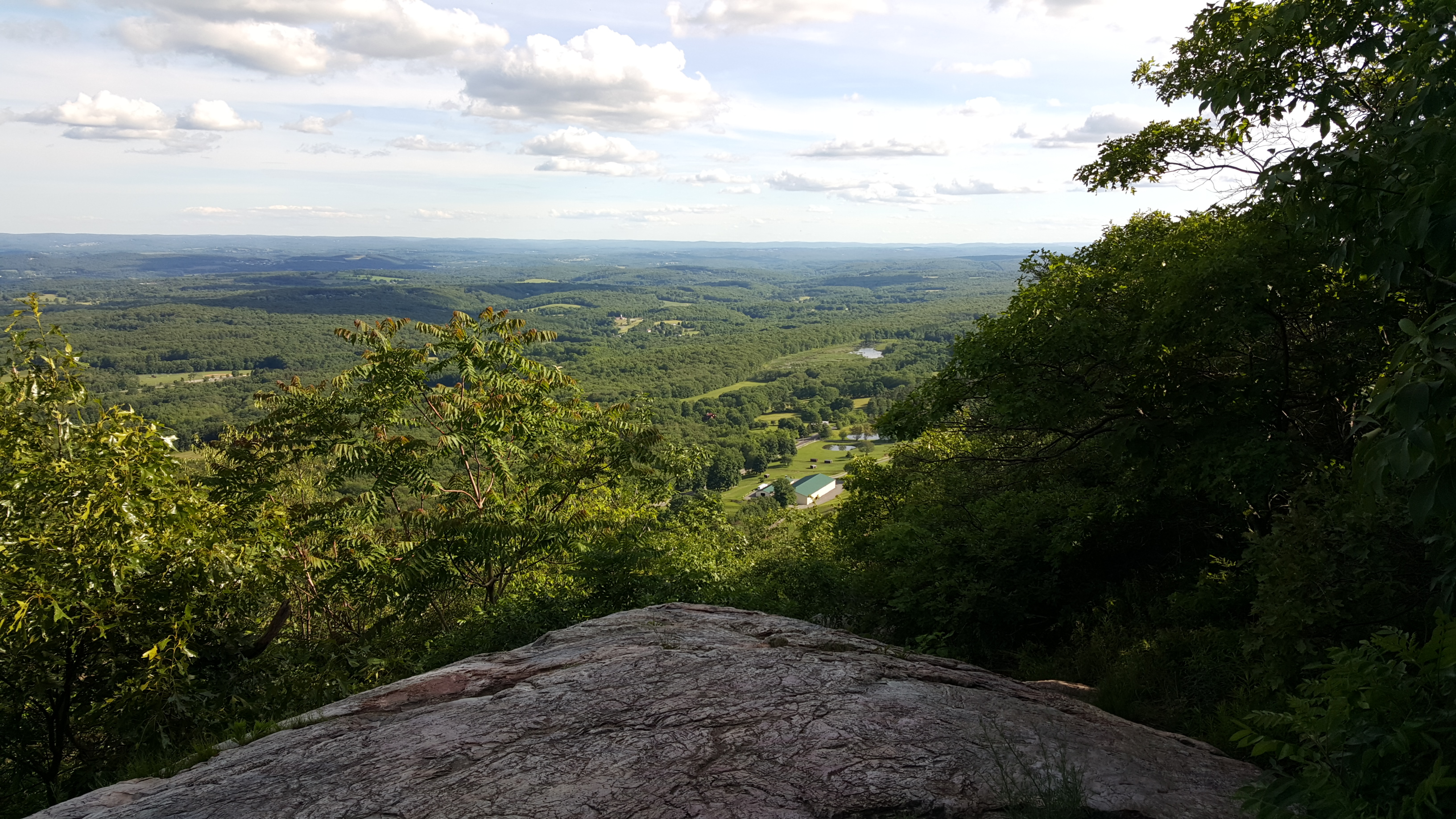
- The Kittatinny Valley seen from Sunrise Mountain lookout

Highest point
- Elevation: 1,803 ft (550 m)
- Coordinates: 41.136°N 74.797°W

Geography
- Location: New Jersey, United States
- Parent range: Ridge-and-valley Appalachians

Kittatinny Mountain (Lenape: Kitahtëne) is a long ridge traversing primarily Sussex County in northwestern New Jersey, running in a northeast–southwest axis, a continuation across the Delaware Water Gap of Pennsylvania's Blue Mountain (also known as Kittatinny Ridge). It is the first major ridge in the far northeastern extension of the Ridge and Valley province of the Appalachian Mountains, and reaches its highest elevation (the state's highest), 1,803 feet, at High Point in Montague Township. Kittatinny Mountain forms the eastern side of Wallpack Valley; the western side comprises the Wallpack Ridge (highest elevation: 928 feet (283 m) above sea level.

== Protected areas ==
Most of the range is publicly owned and protected. In the far northeast, High Point State Park protects the area around High Point itself. Further southwest, Stokes State Forest encompasses much of the range from the southern boundary of High Point State Park to the eastern boundary of the Delaware Water Gap National Recreation Area. The recreation area encompasses the entire southern half of the range, and also contains the smaller Worthington State Forest, which also protects the southwestern end of the range near the Delaware Water Gap itself.

== Geology ==
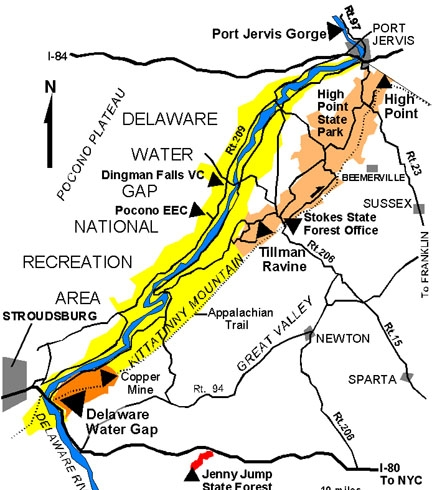

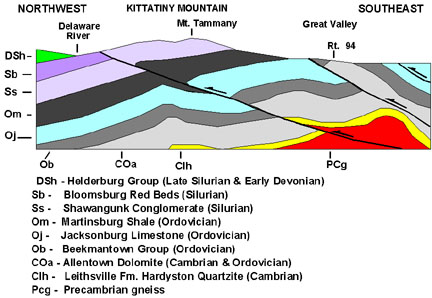
Kittatinny Mountain cross section

The name Kittatinny comes from a Lenape Native American word meaning "endless hill" or "great mountain". The highest peak in the range is High Point at 1,803 feet (550 m), which is also the highest point in the state of New Jersey. This peak is located in High Point state park and has a road leading to the top. The second highest mountain is Sunrise Mountain, located within Stokes State Forest. The elevation here is 1,653 feet (504 m) and has a road leading almost to the top. At the top there is a shelter with a roof but no sides.

The Kittatinny Mountain is of the Silurian Shawangunk Conglomerate which is mainly composed of quartz. Due to the hardness of the quartz, the mountain is extremely resistant to weathering.

Around four hundred fifty million years ago, a chain of volcanic islands shaped like an arch collided with proto North America. The North American Plate went under the chain of islands. The islands went on top of the edge of North America creating the Highlands and the Kittatinny Valley which is the Ordovician Martinsburg Shale. Quartz and other sedimentary conglomerate was transported to the inland sea, which was over part of the Martinsburg Shale. A small continent then collided with North America around four hundred million years ago. Geologic pressure resulted, which caused compression and then folding and faulting resulted. The folding ran perpendicular to the directional forces. During folding, intense heat melted silica which cemented the quartz and other stones together. Also the intense heat allowed the rock layers to bend, thus the Kittatinny Mountain was born.

Near the base of the west side of the mountain is the Silurian High Falls Formation, which is red and green shale and sandstone. The east side of the mountain near the base is of the Ordovician Martinsburg Formation which contains slate, shale and sandstone. The top of the mountain has a fairly even elevation ranging between 1,400 feet (430 m) and 1,600 feet (490 m). There are two exceptions. One is Culver's Gap, which was created by an ancient stream which was diverted and is now a wind gap. The base of Culver's Gap is at least 400 feet (120 m) below the top of the mountain. Culver's Gap is located near Culver's Lake, just west of Branchville. The second is a small gap in the mountain, south of Catfish Pond, which is north of the gap. This gap is about 350 feet (110 m) deep.

Culver's Gap was a route used by Paleo Indians and the Lenape Native Americans to go through the mountain to trade and hunt. The second is a groove or depression in the mountain ridge near Catfish Pond. This is about 373 feet (114 m) deep as the base of the depression is 1,100 feet (340 m) and the top of the mountain at that place is 1,473 feet (449 m). The top of the mountain ranges from 50 meters wide to nearly 4 miles (6.4 km) wide.

West of the Kittatinny Mountain, at the northwestern end is the Port Jervis trough, also called the Minisink Valley. Next to the mountain on the western side is the Flatbrook Valley or Walpack Valley which runs from Steam Mill to Flatbrookville. From the Delaware Water Gap to the New York line is 40 miles (64 km) but the ridges continues into New York State where it is known as the Shawangunk Mountains. The ridge continues to nearly Kingston, New York.

The Wisconsin glacier covered the entire mountain about 21,000 BC, and melted about 13,000 BC. The terminal moraine is located near Belvidere. The glacier has left end moraines, periglacial rock fields, and kettles, at the northern end of the mountain in Stokes State Forest.

The area was a Tundra biome after the glacier melted and then became a Taiga biome as the climate warmed. At that time coniferous trees such as spruce and pine inhabited the area. The area warmed more around 8000 BC so oak, maple, birch, willow, and other deciduous trees began to grow.

== Paleo Indians ==
Paleo Indians inhabited the Delaware River Valley around 10,500 BC. after the Wisconsin Glacier melted. They hunted, fished and gathered plants to eat in the Delaware Valley and on Kittatinny Mountain. They had no permanent camps and traveled often in search of food. As the glacier melted, grasslands developed which eventually turned into coniferous and later deciduous forests after thousands of years. Big game roamed the grassland which allowed Paleo Indians to survive. Around 8000 B.C. deciduous trees began to grow, in which nut trees began to grow to allow the collection of nuts. This allowed Paleo Indian populations to increase slowly. The Marshall Creek Mastodon found just north of the Gap was dated at 10,210BC ±180 years. Other big game existed at the time such as caribou and muskox.

== Native Americans ==
The Lenape Native Americans that came to the area two thousand years ago from the Mississippi River valley traveled on the mountain in search of plant foods and game. They collected acorns, walnuts, hickory nuts, beech nuts, chestnuts, and butternuts from the deciduous forest and collected water from fresh streams. The Lenapes also hunted deer, elk, and bear on the mountain.

== Waterfalls, cliffs and lakes ==
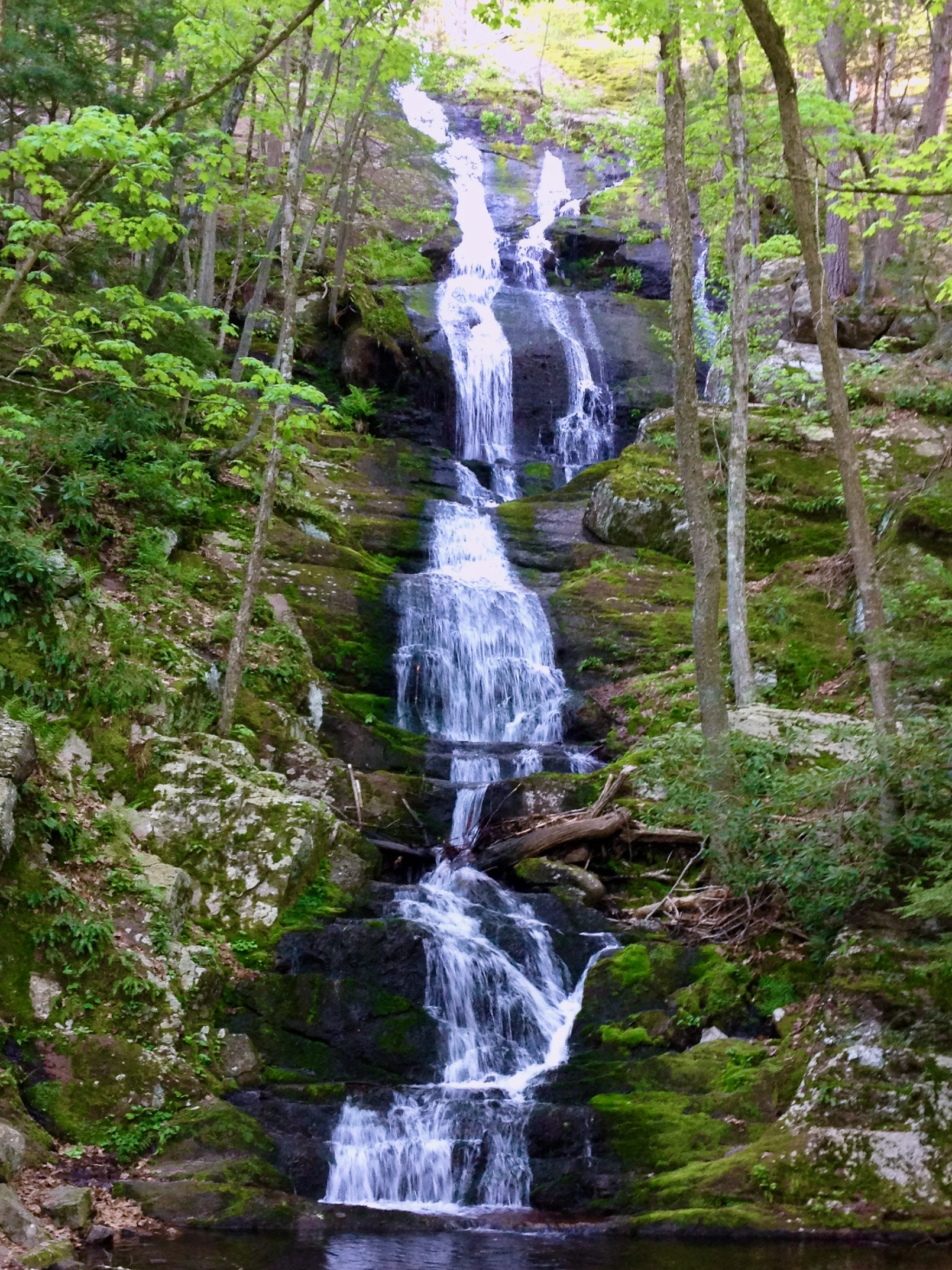
Buttermilk Falls

There is one waterfall on the western side of the mountain known as Buttermilk Falls. This is about 4 miles (6.4 km) south of US Route 206, in which a dirt road leads to the base of it. A wooden staircase has been built near it, so people can climb to the top. A second falls is seasonable during heavy rains next to Interstate 80 near the Big Cliffs. Water slides over the rocks and drops over a small ledge before going under Interstate 80.

There are several cliffs on the mountain. The largest is located at the Delaware Water Gap. The cliff is up to 300 feet (91 m) high and starts at Interstate 80 and extends about 400 meters along the mountain The second largest cliff is located 6 miles (9.7 km) north of the Gap, on the eastern side. Small rock faces exist on the western face and eastern face along the mountain. The southeastern face of the mountain has a steeper pitch than the northwestern face.

The top of the mountain has 14 lakes and ponds. Sunfish Pond, Catfish Pond, Mountain Ridge Lake, Blue Mountain Lake, Long Pine Pond, Lake Success, Crater Lake, Hemlock Lake, Kittatinny Lake, Steeny Kill Lake and Lake Marcia are some of them. Lake Marcia is the lake with the highest elevation on the mountain, 1,574 feet (480 m) above sea level. This lake is located in High Point State Park which is at the northern end of Kittatinny Mountain.

== Flora and fauna ==
The mountain is a northern deciduous forest of various oaks, hickories, maples, birches, walnut, elm, ash, birch, sycamore, cherry, beech, chestnut, and sweet gum. Wild blueberries and rhodendrum also grow on the mountain. Animals such as whitetailed deer, gray squirrels, red squirrels, chipmunks, gray fox, bobcats, beaver, black bears as well as a large variety of birds inhabit the mountain. Turkey Vultures and Red Tail Hawks are also common. Fish such as trout, pickerel, and bass are also in the lakes.

== Mining ==
Copper mining began in the 1750s at the Pahaquarry Copper Mine, which is 8 miles (13 km) north of the Gap, off Old Mine Road. This mine is located in the Silurian High Falls Formation on the west side of the mountain. This sandstone is very hard and made mining very difficult. The copper was between 2 and 3 percent in the ore which made mining unprofitable. Mining was done in the 1800s, by various companies which went bankrupt. The mine sold several times.

Silver mining began in the 1880s with John Snook digging a mine at the northern end and western face of the Kittatinny mountain in an area now known as Stokes State Forest. He extracted silver ore for a short time and the silver ore was depleted. The mine is now flooded with water.

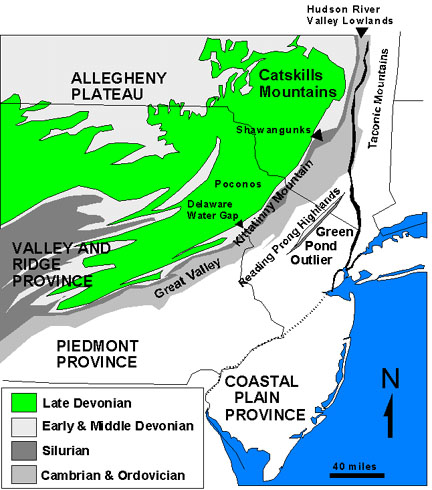
Map of the "Sedimentary Appalachians" Province in the New York Bight region including the Valley and Ridge Province and the Allegheny Plateau and the Catskill Mountains

== Kittatinny and Flatbrook Valleys ==
To the east of the Kittatinny Mountain, is the Kittatinny Valley. This is drained by the Paulinskill river in the south and the Wallkill River in the north. The Big Flatbrook drains the mountain on the northwestern end beginning at Steam mill swamp and flows in a southwesterly direction which drains into the Delaware River near Flatbrookville. This area is known as the Flatbrook Valley. The Port Jervis trough is at the northwestern end of the mountain. The Delaware River flows near the mountain at the south end, finally cutting across the ridge at the Delaware Water Gap just south of Mount Tammany.

The Kittatinnies are a far northeastern extension of the Ridge and Valley province of the Appalachian Mountains. In Pennsylvania, the ridge forming the Kittatinnies becomes known as Blue Mountain and runs southwest for 150 miles (240 km), nearly to Maryland. In Franklin County, Pennsylvania, however, a parallel ridge to Blue Mountain is named "Kittatinny Mountain"; the Pennsylvania Turnpike tunnels through both ridges (a very short distance apart) with the western tunnel named "Kittatinny Mountain" and the eastern one "Blue Mountain." To the north in New York, the ridge is known as the Shawangunk Mountains which goes to Kingston, New York.

== See also ==
- Kittatinny Formation
- Wallpack Ridge
- Mount Tammany Fire Road
