= Little Flat Brook =

Coordinates: 41.19238°N 74.844747°W

Little Flat Brook is a 12.7-mile-long (20.4 km) tributary of Flat Brook in Sussex County, New Jersey in the United States.

Upstream of the confluence with Little Flat Brook, Flat Brook is known as Big Flat Brook.

== See also ==
- List of rivers of New Jersey
