= Flat Brook =

Stream in Sussex County, New Jersey

Coordinates: 41.188731°N 74.847064°W

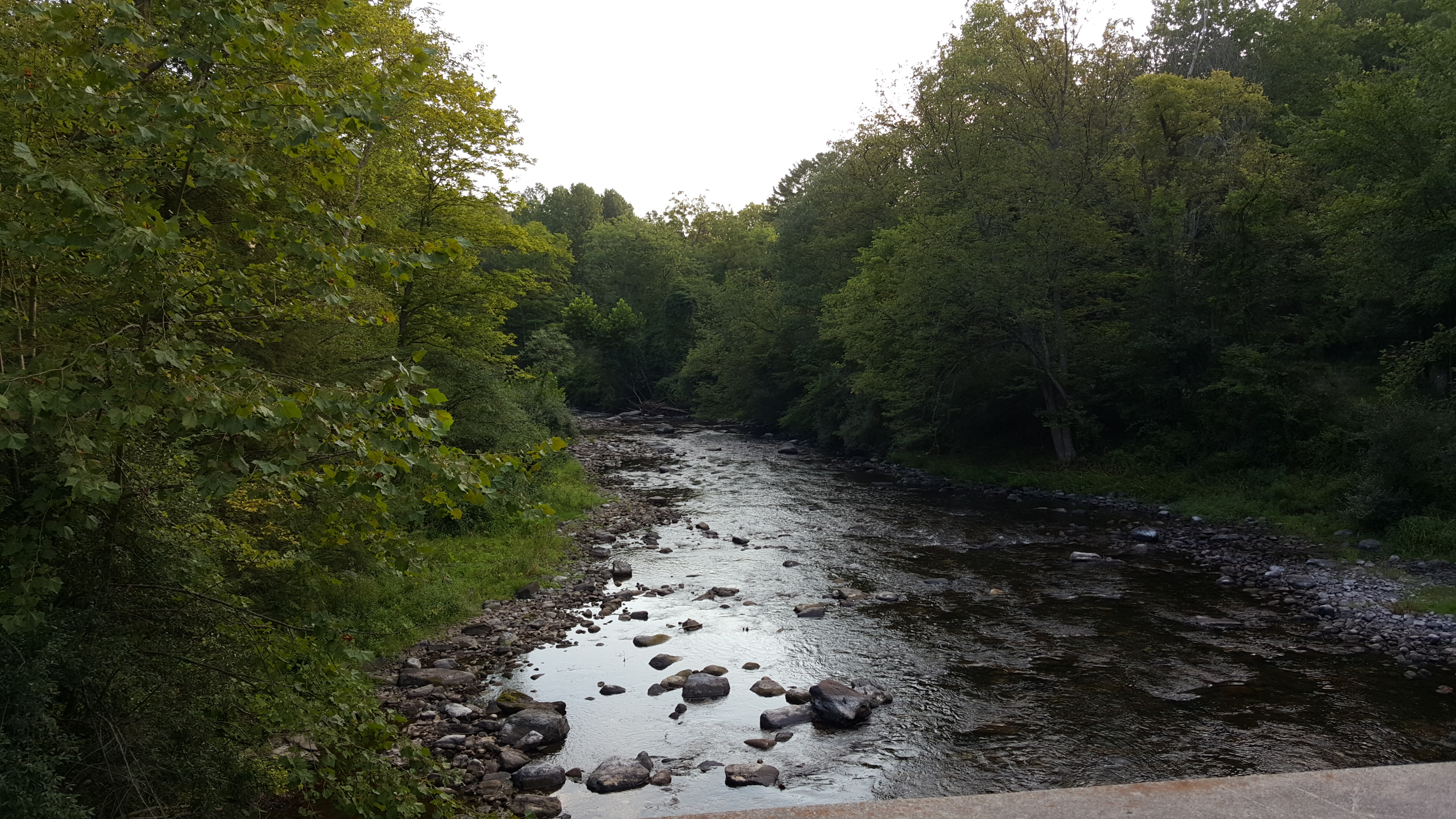
The Flatbrook in Walpack approximately 400 yards north of its mouth

Flat Brook, also spelled as Flatbrook, is an 11.6-mile-long (18.7 km) tributary of the Delaware River in Sussex County, New Jersey in the United States.

Upstream of the inflow of Little Flat Brook, the brook is known as Big Flat Brook.

Historically, the watershed of the Flat Brook, and its two main tributaries, the 12.7 miles (20.4 km) Little Flat Brook and 16.5 miles (26.6 km) Big Flat Brook, has been known as the Walpack Valley and is part of the historic Minisink region.

The Appalachian Trail passes through the watershed of the Flat Brook along Kittatinny Mountain.

The Flat Brook flows into the Delaware River near Walpack Bend in the Flatbrookville section of Walpack Township.

== Tributaries ==
- Flat Brook
  - Tillman Brook
  - Little Flat Brook
    - Beerskill
  - Big Flat Brook
    - Criss Brook
    - Forked Brook
    - Normanock Brook
    - Parker Brook
    - Stony Brook

== See also ==
- List of rivers of New Jersey
