= Big Flat Brook =

Tributary of the Delaware River, New Jersey, USA

Coordinates: 41.194899°N 74.834104°W

Big Flat Brook is the name of Flat Brook upstream of the inflow of Little Flat Brook, a tributary of the Delaware River, in Sussex County, New Jersey in the United States.

Big Flat Brook is 16.5 miles (26.6 km) long.

== See also ==
- List of rivers of New Jersey
