= New Jersey Route 60 =

Proposed state highway in New Jersey, US

Route 60
- Deepwater-Ocean City Expressway

Route information
- Maintained by NJDOT
- Length: 58.4 mi (94.0 km)
- Existed: 1953–1970s (never built)

Major junctions
- West end: US 40 in Deepwater
- Route 55 in Vineland
- East end: US 9 / G.S. Parkway in Ocean City

Location
- Country: United States
- State: New Jersey
- Counties: Salem, Cumberland, Atlantic

Highway system
- New Jersey State Highway Routes; Interstate; US; State; Scenic Byways
← Route 59	→ Route 62

Route 60 was a proposed limited access state highway in the U.S. state of New Jersey. It would have run from the Delaware Memorial Bridge in the Deepwater neighborhood of Pennsville Township to Ocean City. The freeway was to parallel U.S. Route 40 from its start, then run as a concurrency with Route 55 in Vineland. From there it would have continued east and ended at Ocean City. It was designed as a connection between South Jersey and points west via the Delaware Memorial Bridge. However, the nearby Atlantic City Expressway, combined with a fiscal crisis in the mid-1970s, prevented the freeway from being built.

Despite the plans for the freeway being shelved, the New Jersey Department of Transportation (NJDOT) hasn't officially taken it off their route log. Route 60 along with Route 74, and Route 85 are the only remaining unbuilt freeways not yet repealed the New Jersey State Legislature.

== History ==
Route 60 was designated in 1953 as a proposed freeway from the Verga section of West Deptford Township via Barrington to Bridgeboro. This was realigned and was later designated as part of I-295.

Facing a dilemma due to the increase in automobile traffic after World War II, the New Jersey State Highway Department brought together a proposed set of freeways across the state of New Jersey in 1960. One proposal set forth was of a freeway connecting Deepwater to Ocean City, paralleling the alignment of U.S. Route 40. From the community of Millville to Vineland, Route 60 was proposed to be concurrent with the also proposed Route 55. From there, the highway was supposed to head eastward to the U.S. Route 9 Expressway near Ocean City, New Jersey. The design of the freeway was to help improve urbanization through places such as Millville and Vineland, along with providing access for people from Delaware, Maryland, and southeastern Pennsylvania to the southern portions of the Jersey Shore. The New Jersey Department of Transportation did estimate construction of the 58.4-mile-long (94.0 km) freeway to cost $116 million (1967 USD), however, difficulties in the economy along with the close proximity of the nearby Atlantic City Expressway killed the project from moving forward.

Since the 1970s, proposals have arisen to revive the Route 60 freeway. In 2007, the Western/Southern Cumberland Regional Planning proposed a new freeway spur from the constructed Route 55 Freeway to the community of Bridgeton, New Jersey following the general alignment of current day County Route 552. This same study indicates a need for a limited access interstate freeway from the Delaware Memorial Bridge to Atlantic City, New Jersey. In February 2010, Assemblywoman Celeste Riley proposed the revival of the Route 60 freeway via a study of the lack of transportation in Bridgeton. The study would also look into the best transportation between the Delaware Memorial Bridge and Atlantic City. However, local officials believe these proposals may not form into reality due to local opposition.

== Proposed exit list ==
County	Location	mi	km	Exit	Destinations	Notes
Salem	Deepwater	0.0	0.0		US 40	Proposed western terminus
Salem	Woodstown				Route 45	
Salem	Upper Pittsgrove Township				Route 77	
Cumberland	Upper Deerfield Township				Route 56	
Cumberland	Vineland				Route 55	Western terminus of proposed concurrency with Route 55
Cumberland	Vineland				Route 55	Eastern terminus of proposed concurrency with Route 55
Atlantic	Hamilton Township				Route 50	
Atlantic	Somers Point				G.S. Parkway	
Atlantic	Somers Point	58.4	94.0		US 9	Proposed eastern terminus of Route 60; Planned to connect to the unbuilt US 9 Freeway
1.000 mi = 1.609 km; 1.000 km = 0.621 mi: Concurrency terminus
