= New Jersey Route 163 =

State highway in Warren County, New Jersey, US

Route 163

Route information
- Maintained by NJDOT
- Length: 0.30 mi (480 m)
- Existed: 1953–present

Major junctions
- South end: US 46 in Delaware
- North end: Dead end in Delaware

Location
- Country: United States
- State: New Jersey
- Counties: Warren

Highway system
- New Jersey State Highway Routes; Interstate; US; State; Scenic Byways
← Route 162	→ Route 164

Route 163 is a short 0.30-mile-long (0.48 km) state highway in Warren County in New Jersey. The route, which is currently a stub, used to be the approach to the destroyed Darlington's Bridge at Delaware Station, which was a road bridge over the Delaware River, connecting the settlement of Delaware, New Jersey, with Portland, Pennsylvania. Until 1953, the bridge carried U.S. Route 46 over the river. The bridge has been destroyed, but the approaches are still state-maintained. A still-existing bridge carries an abandoned ex-Delaware, Lackawanna and Western Railroad line across the river just north of the former road crossing. The unsigned Route 163 runs from US 46 north to a dead end on the east side of US 46, all in Knowlton Township, New Jersey. From the dead end, the bridge approach continued northwest and west over US 46 to the bridge.

== Route description ==
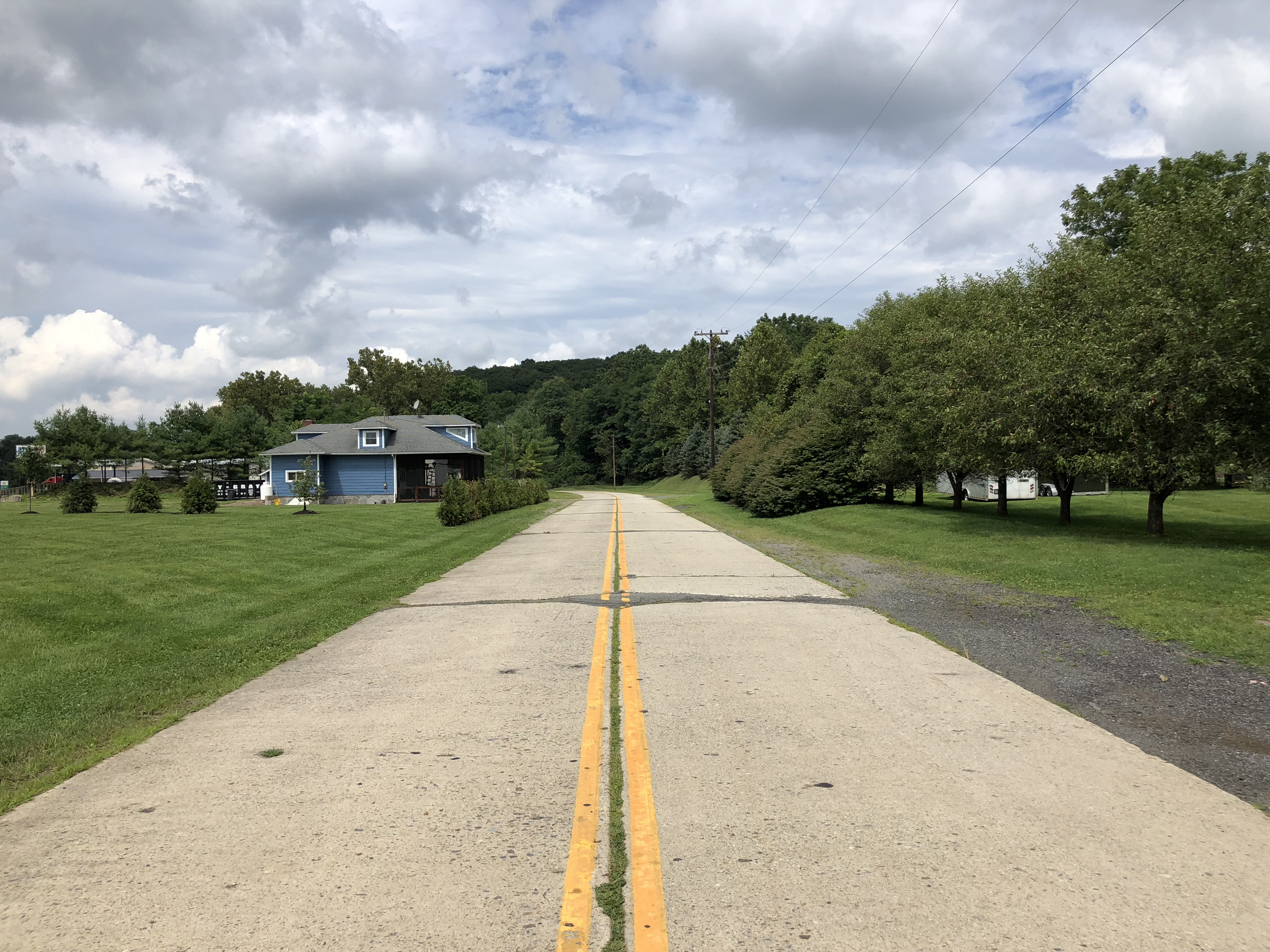
Route 163 in Knowlton Township with its original pavement

Route 163 begins north of an intersection with U.S. Route 46 and Roy Ace Street in the community of Delaware. The highway heads to the north along Lackawanna Road. Route 163 passes several residences to the north and a short stretch of homes to the south. There is a short intersection with an unnamed local road. After that intersection, Route 163 passes a truck stop that is visible on both Route 46, which parallels to the south, and the short state highway. There is another short truck stop before an intersection with a return ramp to Route 46. Route 163 officially terminates at a barricaded dead-end near Hemlock Hill Lane.

== History ==
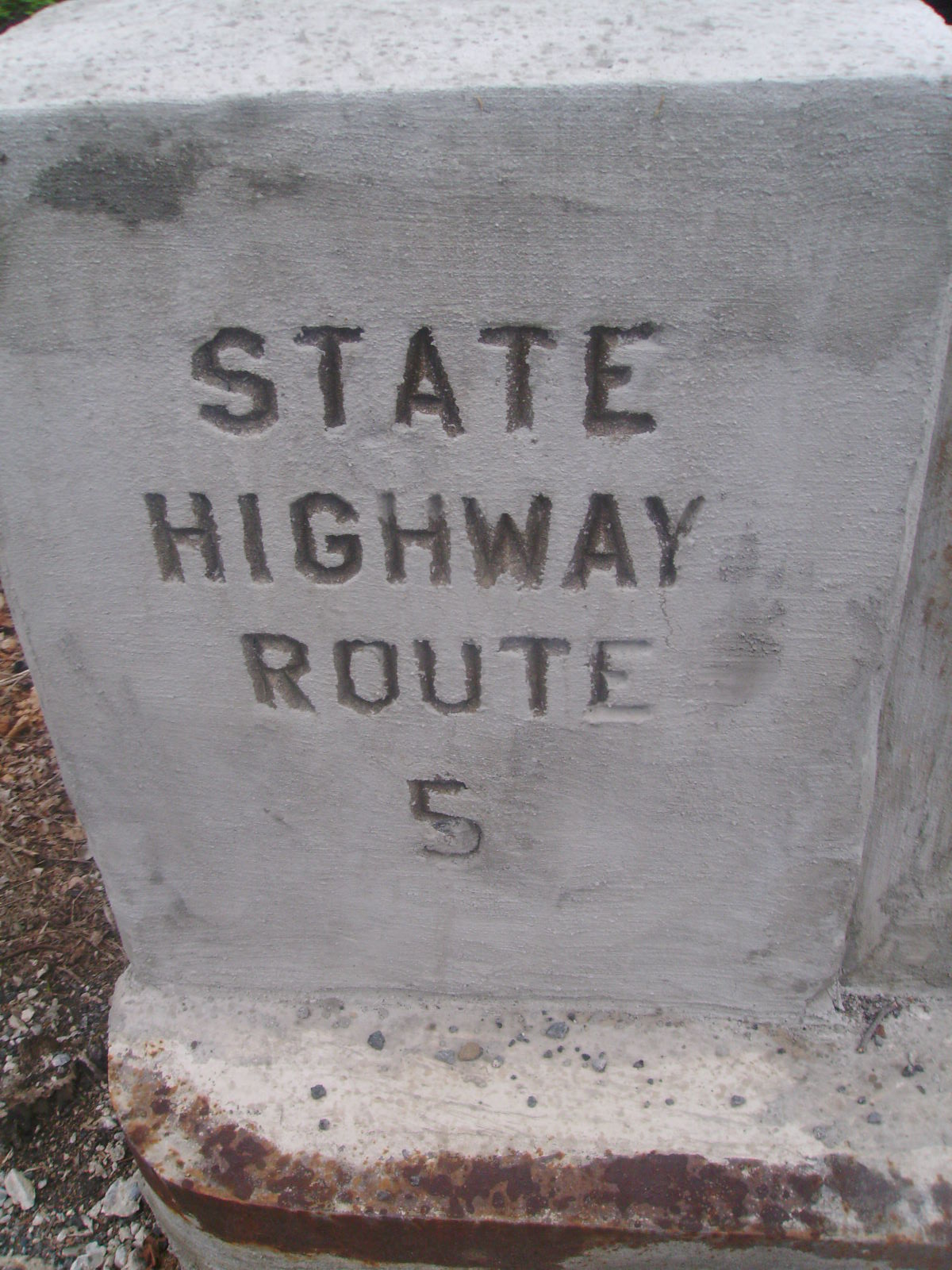
Bridge stamp for pre-1927 Route 5 along Route 163

New Jersey Route 163 originated as an alignment of U.S. Route 46 (co-signed with New Jersey State Highway Route 6). The alignment of 6 and 46 went along the alignment of the original State Highway Route 5 from the early 1920s, stretching from Newark to the bridge over the Delaware River at Delaware. The route was decommissioned when the 1927 renumbering occurred. After that renumbering, the route became State Highway Route 6, a co-designation to U.S. Route 46, which had been assigned the prior year. The two highway designations remained intact until the 1953 renumbering, when Route 6 was decommissioned in favor of using the U.S. 46 designation. U.S. Route 46 was realigned once again when the Portland-Columbia Toll Bridge opened in 1953, when the alignment of the highway was changed to head along former State Highway Route 8 (mostly New Jersey Route 94), where it ended at U.S. Route 611 and Route 94, where its current terminus is located. After the realigning of the Route 46 Delaware River crossing, the remaining route to Darlington's Bridge was renumbered to New Jersey Route 163, in the 1953 renumbering. The bridge was decommissioned on April 3, 1954 and demolished a few days later, but the state continued to maintain State Route 163 that previously led to the bridge.

Two years later, the covered bridge at Columbia was swept away in floods caused by Hurricane Connie and Diane in 1955, which took out several other bridges over the Delaware.

== Major intersections ==
The entire route is in Delaware, Warren County.

mi	km	Destinations	Notes
0.00	0.00	US 46	Southern terminus
0.30	0.48	Dead end	Northern terminus
1.000 mi = 1.609 km; 1.000 km = 0.621 mi
