= Delaware River Bridge =

Delaware River Bridge or Delaware River Bridges may refer to:

- Benjamin Franklin Bridge - originally named the Delaware River Bridge
- Delaware River – Turnpike Toll Bridge - sometimes referred to as the Delaware River Bridge
- Delaware Memorial Bridge - sometimes referred to as the Delaware River Bridges
- Darlington's Bridge at Delaware Station - was referred to as the Delaware River Bridge by locals before demolition
- List of crossings of the Delaware River - a list of all bridges across the Delaware River
