= Flummerfelt =

Flummerfelt is a surname. Notable people with the surname include:

- Charles H. Flummerfelt (1863–1931), American politician
- Joseph Flummerfelt (1937–2019), American conductor
