= Delaware, New Jersey =

Delaware, New Jersey could refer to:

- Delaware, Warren County, New Jersey
- Delaware Township, Camden County, New Jersey, renamed Cherry Hill in 1961
- Delaware Township, Hunterdon County, New Jersey
