= New Jersey Route 74 =

Proposed state highway in Middlesex County, New Jersey, US

Route 74
- Industrial Freeway
- The interchange between Route 18 and CR 535, the approximate area where Route 74 would have begun

Route information
- Maintained by NJDOT
- Length: 10.60 mi (17.06 km)
- Existed: 1956–Early 1980s (never built)

Major junctions
- West end: Route 18 in East Brunswick
- US 9 / Route 34 in Old Bridge Township
- East end: Route 35 in Laurence Harbor

Location
- Country: United States
- State: New Jersey
- Counties: Middlesex

Highway system
- New Jersey State Highway Routes; Interstate; US; State; Scenic Byways
← Route 73	→ Route 75

Route 74 was a proposed limited-access state highway in Middlesex County and Monmouth County of the U.S. state of New Jersey. The route was to be a four-lane divided highway from Route 18 in East Brunswick eastward to an interchange with Route 35 in the Laurence Harbor section of Old Bridge Township. The freeway would have provided a much needed east–west connection between U.S. Route 9 and Route 18. Tentatively named the "Industrial Freeway", Route 74 was to be a 10.60-mile (17.06 km) long four-lane freeway, with eight exits. Also included in the proposal was a U.S. Route 9 expressway to Route 35 in South Amboy and a connector spur from Route 74 back to Route 35 near Morgan.

Plans for the Route 74 "Industrial" Freeway date back to 1956, when local officials brought up the original plan to the state level. The state legislated the designation in January 1962, and studies for construction began four years later. Although the construction of the freeway seemed imminent, a transportation bond issue in 1972 killed the construction. Although a local agency gave Route 74 one last shot in 1975, the plans for a freeway were shelved. Despite that, the New Jersey Department of Transportation and New Jersey State Legislature haven't officially taken it off their "Route Log" in the statutes. Route 74, along with New Jersey Route 60 and New Jersey Route 85, are the only remaining unbuilt freeways left on the official NJDOT "Route Log".

== History ==
The original proposals for the Industrial Highway in Middlesex and Monmouth Counties date back to 1956, when officials from both counties brought forth a plan for a new industrial highway from Route 18 in East Brunswick eastward to Route 35 in Matawan. The proposal was then submitted by local authorities to then-state senator John Lynch. The proposal was turned into a bill and turned over the New Jersey State Legislature, who passed it in January 1962. From studies performed by Parsons Brinckerhoff in 1966 and 1967, the Route 74 Freeway was to serve the need for an east–west expressway on the area south of the Raritan River. The area covered in the studies showed that by 1985, the amount of parkland, industry and community size would grow by 150%. The existing east–west two-lane roadways would then be unable to carry the amount of projected traffic daily.

In order to protect Cheesequake State Park and lessen the interference of private industrial land, the state chose the preferred alignment. This alignment would end up seizing 19 residential homes and 19 commercial businesses to build the new freeway. Along with the right-of-way exception and construction costs, the estimated cost for building the Route 74 Freeway would be about $64.7 million (1970 USD). Although the freeway in plans were supposed to cross the Garden State Parkway around milepost 119, there were no set plans for an interchange between the two highways. However, the studies from Parsons Brinckerhoff did put forth that this could be possible in the future. Also, the new freeway did not serve access to the New Jersey Turnpike, the route was to begin just a mile south of Route 18's interchange. Bundled up with Route 74 were two other expressways, the construction of a new expressway on U.S. Route 9 itself, and a spur route off of Route 74 further east. The connecting freeway were later added to the state legislation in 1971.

However, when the state transportation bond proposed by the Legislature in 1972 failed, the construction of the Route 74 Freeway seemed inevitable. In 1975, the Tri-State Transportation Commission gave the pitch of attempting Route 74 one last time, citing that it would "help serve planned industrial and residential concentrations". The commission's report cited that the route is started soon, could be constructed by 2000. However, by the early 1980s, the commission had dropped the route from their focus, and despite no route ever being constructed, Route 74, along with Route 60 and Route 85, remain in the state's unofficial Route Log in the state statutes.

== Proposed route ==
Route 74 was to begin at an interchange with Route 18 in the community of East Brunswick (in Middlesex County). The route was to head eastward, crossing over CR 527 (the Old Bridge Turnpike) just after its impetus. From there, the four-lane freeway was to enter the community of South River, where it would have an interchange with CR 535 (Main Street). The route would dip to the south, cross over the South River and into Sayreville. There it would parallel CR 535 (now known as Washington Road), and interchange with CR 675 (Jernee's Mill Road) in the community. After an interchange with Minisink Avenue, Route 74 was to turn to the southeast and head out of Sayreville. Starting here, the area surrounding the freeway was to be improvised with major development.

The route was to continue to the southeast, approaching an interchange with CR 615 (Bordentown-South Amboy Turnpike). At that interchange, Route 74 was to turn eastward again, reaching an interchange with the proposed US 9 expressway. Also to be present at this interchange was the northern terminus of Route 34 in Browntown. After crossing US 9 and Route 34, Route 74 was to continue eastward into more rural portions of Middlesex County, interchanging with a spur which would head northward to Route 35 in South Amboy. Route 74 would parallel to the north of Route 34 past the community of Cheesequake, crossing the southern line of Cheesequake State Park. The route would then cross into a small portion of the state park when it turned to the northeast, interchanging with CR 689 (Morristown Road) in Cheesequake.

After leaving the park, Route 74 was to continue northeastward, running along the Middlesex-Monmouth county line. A short distance later, it would cross over Milepost 119 of the Garden State Parkway, with no interchange. Paralleling the Lawrence Parkway to the west, Route 74 turned northward, interchanging and coming to an end at Route 35 in Laurence Harbor, just north of the county line.

== Proposed exit list ==
The entire route was to be in Middlesex County.

Location	mi	km	Exit	Destinations	Notes
East Brunswick	0.0	0.0	1	Route 18 (Memorial Highway)	Proposed western terminus
South River			2	CR 535 (Main Street)	
Sayreville			3	CR 675 (Jernee's Mill Road)	
Sayreville			4	Minisink Avenue	
Old Bridge Township			5	CR 615 (Bordentown-South Amboy Turnpike)	
Old Bridge Township			6	US 9 / Route 34 south	Northern terminus of Route 34
Old Bridge Township			7	CR 689 (Morristown Road)	
Old Bridge Township	10.6	17.1	8	Route 35	Proposed eastern terminus
1.000 mi = 1.609 km; 1.000 km = 0.621 mi
