= New Jersey Route 62 =

State highway in Passaic County, New Jersey, US

Route 62
- Union Boulevard

Route information
- Maintained by NJDOT
- Length: 0.47 mi (760 m)
- Existed: January 1, 1953–present

Major junctions
- South end: US 46 / CR 646 in Totowa
- North end: I-80 / CR 646 in Totowa

Location
- Country: United States
- State: New Jersey
- Counties: Passaic

Highway system
- New Jersey State Highway Routes; Interstate; US; State; Scenic Byways
← Route 60	→ Route 63

Route 62 is a 0.47-mile-long (0.76 km) state highway in the U.S. state of New Jersey. It begins at the centerline of U.S. Route 46 (US 46) along Union Boulevard (Passaic County Route 646) in the community of Totowa and continues northward to the merge of the Interstate 80 (I-80) westbound off-ramp at Exit 55B, where Route 62 ends. The route continues as Passaic County Route 646 in both directions, heading northbound to Paterson and southbound to Little Falls.

Route 62 was originally an alignment of Route S6, which was designated in 1929. The route went from the Caldwells in Essex County to the West Paterson corporate line. Route S6 was decommissioned in the 1953 renumbering and replaced with Route 62, which went from Totowa to West Paterson until being truncated to its current length.

== Route description ==
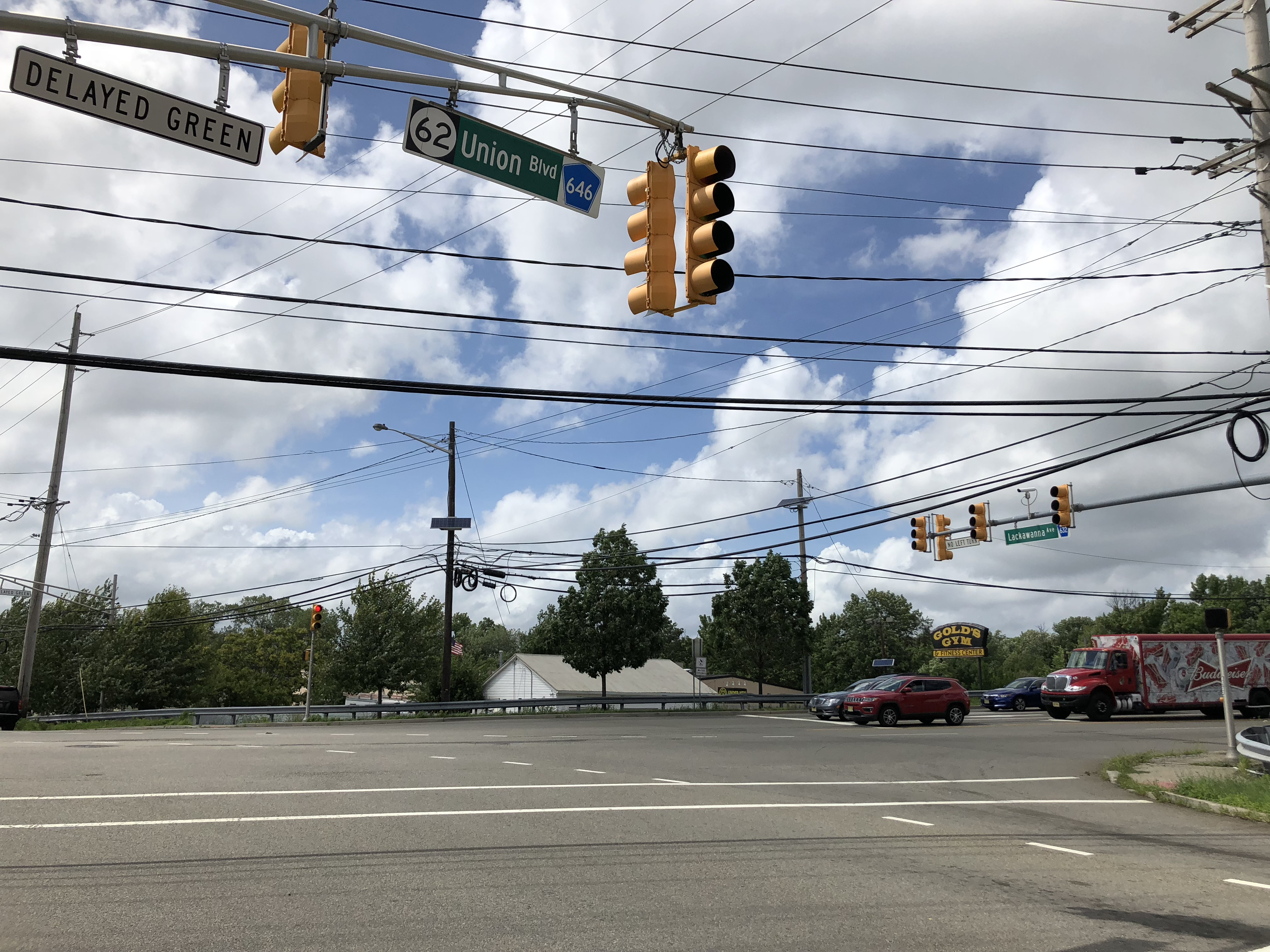
The intersection of Route 62/CR 646 and CR 632 (Lackawanna Avenue) in Totowa. The only signage for the route along the route itself is on traffic light overheads.

Route 62 begins at an intersection with the off-ramp from US 46 eastbound and Passaic County Route 646 in the community of Totowa. The highway heads northward along Union Boulevard, intersecting with the on-ramp from Route 62 to US 46 eastbound. The route heads across a long bridge over the eastbound and westbound divided lanes of US 46. After crossing the bridge, Route 62 heads into a small industrial part of Totowa, where it intersects with the off-ramp from the westbound lanes of US 46. The highway continues northward, intersecting with Furler Street and Lackawanna Avenue with jughandles in the northeastern quadrant. Route 62 continues along Union Boulevard, becoming a divided highway. The highway crosses over a Norfolk Southern railroad line before meeting I-80 at interchange 55A, where the route's designation terminates. The route continues into Paterson as County Route 646.

== History ==
Route S6
- Location: Little Falls–Paterson
- Existed: 1929–1953

Route 62 was the original route of pre-1927 Route 12, and later of Route 6 (the predecessor of Route 46), designated 1927. When in 1929 Route 6 was redefined to bypass Paterson to the south, State Highway Route S6 was also designated to take on its old route west of Paterson. This route headed northbound from Totowa to Paterson following Union Boulevard, Totowa Avenue and McBride Avenue, ending at the Paterson-West Paterson (now Woodland Park) town line for several years, constituting a length of 2.32 miles (3.73 km). Before the bypass of Paterson was completed in 1943, U.S. Route 46 followed Route S6 into the city, following the old Route 6 alignment of McBride Avenue, Spruce Street, and Market Street to its current alignment. In the 1953 New Jersey state highway renumbering on January 1, 1953, Route S6 was renumbered to Route 62. Route 62 remained along this alignment before being truncated by 1980. Route 62 was left out of the Straight Line Diagrams produced by the New Jersey Department of Transportation in 2000, but was returned the next year. Route 62 received improvements of the interchange with US 46 in 2006 at a cost of $22.748 million (2006 USD) to repair the bridge over US 46, ramp reconfigurations and new resurfaced roadway.

== Major intersections ==
The entire route is in Totowa, Passaic County.

mi	km	Destinations	Notes
0.00	0.00	CR 646 south (Union Boulevard) – Little Falls	Southern terminus; south end of CR 646 overlap
0.00	0.00	US 46 – Dover, Clifton	Interchange
0.47	0.76	I-80 east – New York City	Exit 55A (I-80)
0.47	0.76	CR 646 north (Union Boulevard) – Paterson	Northern terminus; north end of CR 646 overlap
1.000 mi = 1.609 km; 1.000 km = 0.621 mi: Concurrency terminus
