= U.S. Route 46 =

Highway in New Jersey

U.S. Route 46
- United Spanish–American War Veterans Memorial Highway
- US 46 highlighted in red

Route information
- Maintained by NJDOT and PANYNJ
- Length: 75.34 mi (121.25 km)
- Existed: 1936–present

Major junctions
- West end: I-80 / Route 94 in Columbia
- I-80 / US 206 in Netcong; Route 15 in Dover; I-287 / US 202 / CR 511 in Parsippany–Troy Hills; I-80 / I-287 in Parsippany–Troy Hills; I-80 / Route 23 in Wayne; Route 21 in Clifton; G.S. Parkway / Route 20 / CR 630 in Clifton; Route 17 in Hasbrouck Heights; US 1-9 in Palisades Park; I-95 / N.J. Turnpike / US 9W / Route 4 in Fort Lee
- East end: I-95 / US 1-9 at the New York state line in Fort Lee

Location
- Country: United States
- State: New Jersey
- Counties: Warren, Morris, Essex, Passaic, Bergen

Highway system
- United States Numbered Highway System; List; Special; Divided; New Jersey State Highway Routes; Interstate; US; State; Scenic Byways
← US 45	US	→ US 48
← PA 45	PA	→ PA 46
← Route 45	NJ	→ Route 46
← Route 5	Route 6	→ Route 7

U.S. Route 46 (US 46) is an east–west U.S. Highway completely within the state of New Jersey, and runs for 75.34 mi (121.25 km). The west end is at an interchange with Interstate 80 (I-80) and Route 94 in Columbia, Warren County, on the Delaware River. The east end is in the middle of the George Washington Bridge over the Hudson River in Fort Lee, Bergen County, while the route runs concurrently with I-95 and US 1/9. Throughout much of its length, US 46 is closely paralleled by I-80. US 46 is a major local and suburban route, with some sections built to or near freeway standards and many other sections arterials with jughandles. The route runs through several communities in the northern part of New Jersey, including Hackettstown, Netcong, Dover, Parsippany–Troy Hills, Wayne, Clifton, Ridgefield Park, Palisades Park, and Fort Lee. It crosses over the Upper Passaic River at several points. The road has been ceremonially named the United Spanish–American War Veterans Memorial Highway.

What is now US 46 was originally designated as three separate routes. Pre-1927 Route 5 was created in 1916 to follow the road from Delaware to Denville, pre-1927 Route 12 in 1917 to follow the route between Hackettstown and Paterson, and pre-1927 Route 10 in 1917 to run between Paterson and Edgewater. In 1927, Route 6 was legislated to run from Delaware east to the George Washington Bridge, replacing portions of Routes 5 and 12 and paralleling the former Route 10, which itself became Route 5 and Route 10N, the latter being shortly removed from the state highway system. In 1936, US 46 was designated to run from U.S. Route 611 in Portland, Pennsylvania, east to the George Washington Bridge. The route replaced Pennsylvania Route 987 (PA 987) to the Delaware Bridge over the Delaware River, and from there followed Route 6 across New Jersey. In 1953, the Route 6 designation was removed from US 46 in New Jersey, and later that year, the route was realigned to end at US 611 in Columbia, New Jersey, replacing a part of Route 94. US 611 had been brought into New Jersey by two new bridges over the Delaware River, following a freeway between them that became a part of I-80. In 1965, US 611 was aligned back into its original Pennsylvania route (which from 1953 until 1965 was US 611 Alternate), and US 46's western terminus remained as an interchange ramp with I-80 and Route 94. Its number is out of place since US 46 lies north of US 22, US 30 and US 40. US 46 is the shortest 2-digit US Highway.

== Route description ==
=== Warren County ===
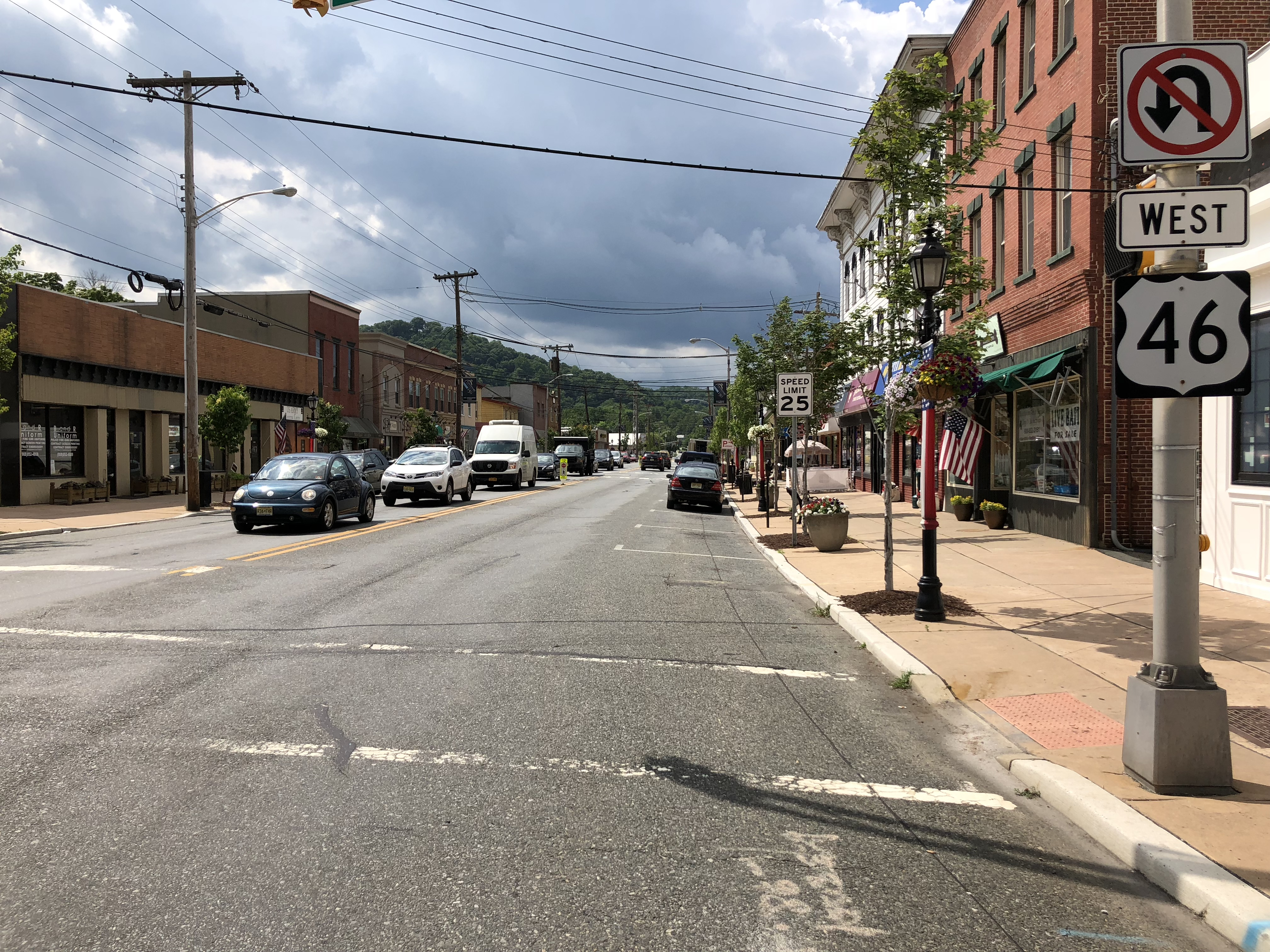
View west along US 46 at Grand Avenue in Hackettstown

US 46 begins at a complex interchange with I-80 and Route 94 near the Portland–Columbia Toll Bridge leading to PA 611 in the community of Columbia in Knowlton Township, Warren County. From this interchange, the route heads southeast along the east bank of the Delaware River as a four-lane divided highway briefly before narrowing into a two-lane undivided road. The road passes through wooded mountainous areas before reaching the community of Delaware. In Delaware, US 46 intersects Route 163, the approach to the former Delaware Bridge, before passing a few commercial establishments. From here, the route continues alongside the river, passing more rural areas of woods and farms with occasional development as it enters White Township. US 46 makes a sharp turn to the east away from the Delaware River, widening into a four-lane divided highway again as it bypasses the town of Belvidere and has a few businesses on it. The road turns back into a two-lane undivided road and comes to a crossroads with County Route 519 (CR 519). Past this intersection, US 46 continues through rural sectors with some business before coming to the northern terminus of Route 31.

From this point, the route continues east through dense woods prior to turning northeast into Liberty Township. The road passes through the community of Townsbury before crossing into Independence Township. Here, US 46 enters more agricultural areas and turns east again, with development increasing along the road as it passes through Great Meadows-Vienna. It continues southeast before entering Hackettstown, where the road becomes Main Street. In Hackettstown, the route crosses NJ Transit's Morristown Line and Montclair-Boonton Line before coming to an intersection with CR 517. Here, CR 517 forms a concurrency with US 46, and the two routes continue southeast through the downtown area. At the intersection with the northern terminus of Route 182, CR 517 splits from US 46 by heading south on that route while US 46 continues to the east.

=== Morris and Essex counties ===
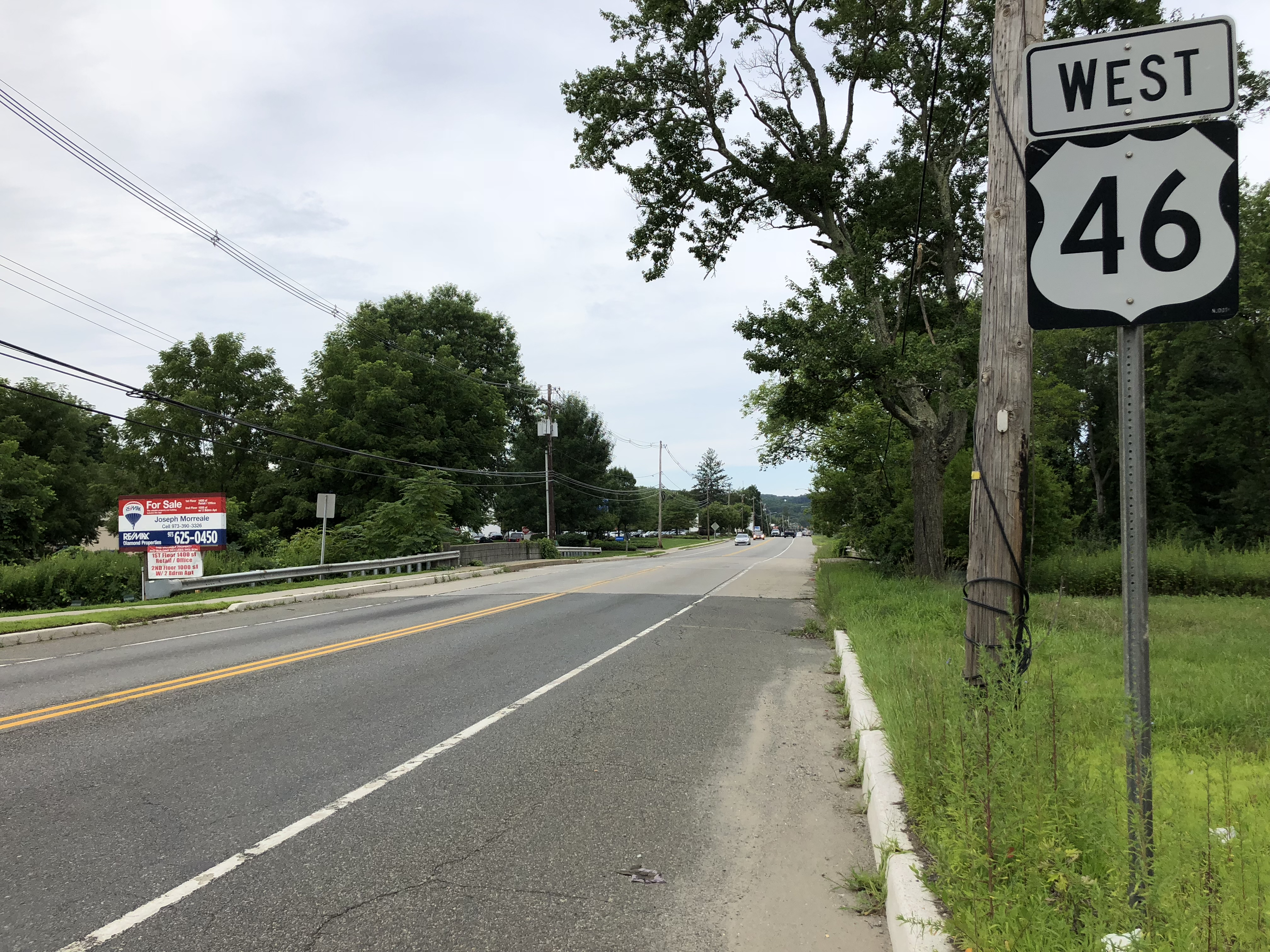
US 46 westbound in Roxbury Township

Shortly after the Route 182 intersection, the route crosses the Musconetcong River into Washington Township, Morris County, where it heads back into rural surroundings. About a mile into Morris County, US 46 divides and becomes a four-lane highway with a wide median. The road passes a median park and ride lot as it turns north and crosses over a mountain. It continues into Mount Olive Township, taking a sharp turn to the east before the road becomes undivided while remaining four lanes. The road passes rural areas and development as it goes through Budd Lake. In this community, the route passes to the south of the namesake lake as it begins to turn northeast and then north. The road heads northeast again before it enters Netcong and becomes a divided highway as it comes to an interchange with I-80/US 206. Within this interchange, the lanes of US 46 split. From this point, the route narrows back into a two-lane undivided road and runs through developed areas of Netcong a short distance to the south of NJ Transit's Morristown Line/Montclair-Boonton Line. US 46 meets Route 183 at an intersection (formerly Netcong Circle) before widening into a four-lane undivided road and leaving Netcong for Roxbury. Here, the road passes through wooded areas, meeting I-80 at another interchange and briefly becoming a divided highway at the crossing under I-80 and again at the actual interchange. US 46 remains a divided highway with jughandles past this point, continuing southeast into the Ledgewood area.

At a three-way intersection which was formerly Ledgewood Circle, Route 10 begins straight while US 46 turns left to continue east as a two-lane undivided road through more development, crossing the Dover and Rockaway River Railroad's High Bridge Branch. Upon crossing the Dover and Rockaway River Railroad's Chester Branch and passing through Kenvil, the road enters Mine Hill, where the road becomes three lanes with two westbound lanes and one eastbound lane. The route passes through Wharton at its southern tip before continuing into Dover. US 46 narrows back into two lanes, becoming Blackwell Street as it passes St. Clare's Dover General Hospital. The road widens to four lanes as Blackwell Street splits from it at an eastbound exit and westbound entrance prior to a bridge over the Rockaway River and NJ Transit's Morristown Line/Montclair-Boonton Line. A short distance later, US 46 intersects the southern terminus of Route 15 and passes over the Dover and Rockaway River Railroad's Dover and Rockaway Branch. From here, the route continues on McFarland Street. US 46 continues east, entering Rockaway Township, where there is an intersection with CR 513. Past CR 513, the road narrows to two lanes as it heads northeast through Rockaway Borough before turning east and crossing the Rockaway River and the Dover and Rockaway River Railroad's Dover and Rockaway Branch. The route continues northeast, entering wooded residential areas as it heads into Denville and has a limited interchange with I-80, where it can only be entered to and from the westbound lane and where US 46 east can only be entered from the eastbound lane and to the eastbound lane. As it crosses under I-80, US 46 becomes a six-lane divided highway.

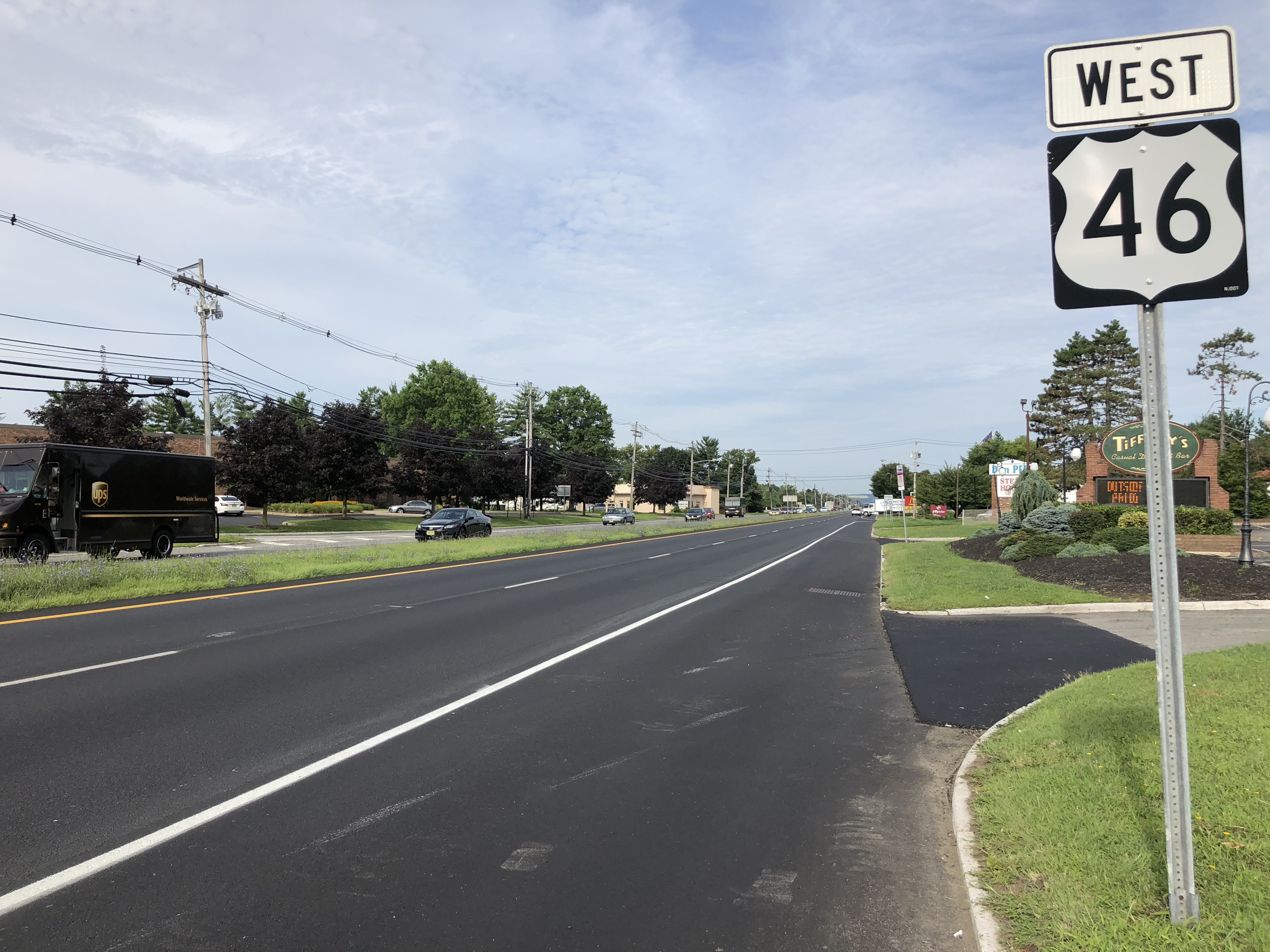
US 46 westbound past Route 159 in Montville Township

The road is lined with a moderate number of businesses, most with right-in/right-out (RIRO) access, as it continues southeast through Denville, narrowing to four lanes before coming to an interchange with Route 53. From this interchange, the route continues east before curving southeast and entering Mountain Lakes. In Mountain Lakes, US 46 crosses under the Montclair-Boonton Line before continuing into Parsippany–Troy Hills. Here, the road comes to US 202/CR 511 before passing under I-287. At this point, the westbound direction of US 46 has a ramp to northbound Interstate 287, with access to and from southbound I-287 provided by US 202. Past the I-287 crossing, the road comes to another partial interchange with I-80 near the western terminus of I-280. Past this interchange, US 46 widens to six lanes and enters Montville. In Montville, the route narrows back to four lanes, and has traffic light-controlled intersections with New Road and Hook Mountain Road/Chapin Road. It then has an interchange with Route 159 and makes a turn to the northeast. Upon crossing the Passaic River at Pine Brook, US 46 enters Essex County into Fairfield Township. A short distance into Essex County, US 46 has another interchange with Route 159 (Clinton Road), providing access to that route and to its continuation as CR 627 (Plymouth Street). Shortly farther along US 46, Route 159 and CR 627 meet it at a traffic light-controlled intersection, providing cross-traffic and turns onto US 46. Past this point, US 46 remains a surface road with RIRO-accessed driveways, but has several intersections controlled by interchanges. Within Fairfield, US 46 has interchanges with Hollywood Avenue and Passaic Avenue as well as two trumpet interchanges providing access to Fairfield Road, which runs a short distance to the south of US 46.

=== Passaic County ===
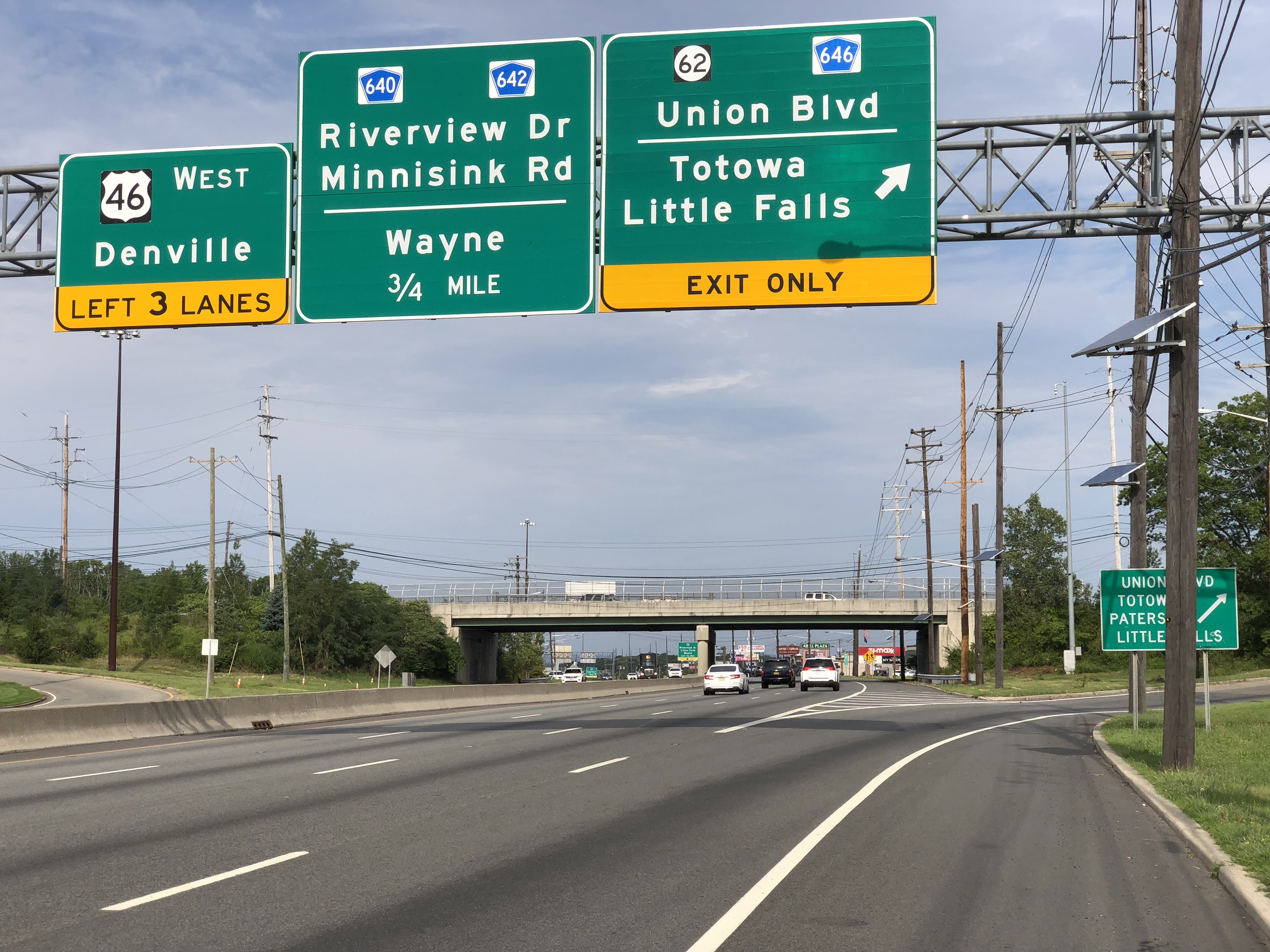
US 46 westbound at exit for Route 62 and CR 646 in Totowa

The route crosses the Passaic River again into Wayne, Passaic County. The median splits as the road passes to the north of the Willowbrook Mall, with an exit serving the shopping mall, before reaching the Spaghetti Bowl interchange with partial access to I-80 and full access to Route 23. Within this interchange, US 46 passes under the Montclair-Boonton Line again. From here, it passes businesses and many shopping centers with RIRO access as a six-lane highway, heading into Totowa. In this area, the route has interchanges with CR 640 and Route 62/CR 646. The road turns southeast, crossing the Passaic River a third time into Little Falls. At this point, US 46 runs along the Little Falls/Woodland Park border, interchanging with CR 639 and Browertown Road. After the exit for Lower Notch Road, the route enters more wooded surroundings, interchanging with Notch Road/Rifle Camp Road before entering Clifton. Upon reaching Clifton, US 46 has an interchange with the western terminus of Route 3 and Valley Road (CR 621), with the Valley Road exit stitched into the Route 3 side of the highway fork. Prior to reconstruction of the interchanges, the Valley Road ramp exited before Route 3 began, and Route 3 branched off immediately after Valley Road.

Past Route 3, the highway narrows to four lanes, continuing east-northeast as a limited-access divided highway with some RIRO-accessed businesses still on it, though many roads are accessed through over and underpasses. US 46 has an exit for Van Houten Avenue/Grove Street before coming to a large interchange with the southern terminus of the Route 19 freeway, CR 509, and the Garden State Parkway. After this, the road passes over Norfolk Southern's Newark Industrial Track line and NJ Transit's Main Line and has an exit for Hazel Street/Paulison Avenue. US 46 then begins a brief concurrency with Piaget Avenue in Clifton with a series of connector streets and three intersections controlled by stoplights. After the third, at Day Street near Christopher Columbus Middle School, the two roads split at a fork, marked as an exit, with US 46 continuing eastbound to the left and Piaget Avenue continuing to the right. Vehicles traveling west on Piaget Avenue have access to US 46 westbound through use of a one way underpass that carries US 46 eastbound over it, and also have access to US 46 eastbound by a right-turn only lane near the intersection of Piaget Avenue and Fourth Street.

After the split, US 46 turns into a limited-access road again and passes under Main Avenue/CR 601 and Norfolk Southern's Passaic Spur line before coming to an interchange with the northern terminus of the Route 21 freeway. From this interchange, the route turns north along the west bank of the Passaic River, crossing the Garden State Parkway again before widening to six lanes and meeting the southern terminus of Route 20 at an interchange near the border of Paterson.

=== Bergen County ===
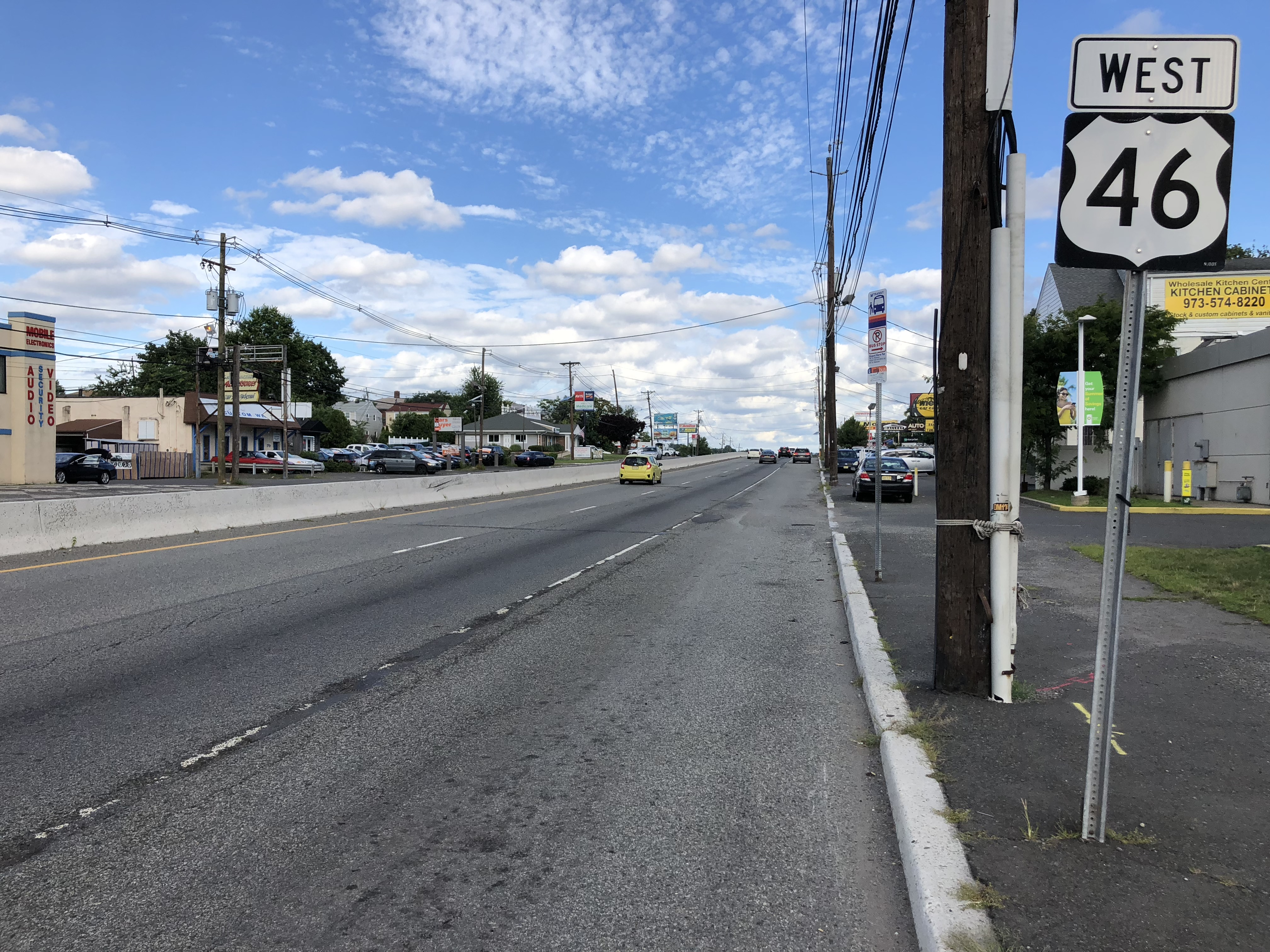
US 46 westbound in Lodi

US 46 turns east and crosses the Passaic River a fourth and final time, entering Bergen County in Elmwood Park. Immediately after the river, the route has an interchange for CR 507. Passing through more RIRO-accessed business areas, the road narrows to four lanes and has a partial interchange with the Garden State Parkway. Past the parkway, US 46 continues as a road with some jughandles and other traffic light-controlled intersections (but still largely maintaining RIRO access to driveways and side streets), crossing New York, Susquehanna and Western Railway's Dundee Branch line and passing through a small corner of Garfield before crossing into Saddle Brook. Within Saddle Brook, the road turns more to the southeast and crosses over NJ Transit's Bergen County Line. Continuing east, US 46 has an exit for with Outwater Lane and crosses into Lodi. Through this area, there is no access across the median of US 46, as it interchanges with Main Street. The route continues into Hasbrouck Heights, where it turns more south-southeast, interchanging with Boulevard. A short distance later, US 46 reaches an interchange with Route 17 and crosses NJ Transit's Pascack Valley Line near the Teterboro station.

From here, US 46 enters Teterboro and interchanges with Green Street before continuing southeast as a six-lane highway through industrial areas, passing to the north of Teterboro Airport. The road continues into Little Ferry, where it passes suburban residential and commercial areas and narrows into a four-lane undivided road called Sylvan Avenue, turning to the east and crossing CR 503. After intersecting the Bergen Turnpike at the modified Little Ferry Circle, which US 46 runs through, the route crosses the Hackensack River into Ridgefield Park on the Route 46 Hackensack River Bridge, passing over New York, Susquehanna and Western Railway's New Jersey Subdivision line and CSX's River Subdivision railroad line before the bridge ends. In Ridgefield Park, the route is called Winant Avenue and becomes a four-lane divided highway before briefly becoming undivided again. Upon turning back into a divided highway, US 46 comes to a large interchange with I-95/New Jersey Turnpike. Past this interchange, the route widens to six lanes and crosses the Overpeck Creek into Ridgefield, where it passes over CSX's Northern Running Track railroad line into the Morsemere neighborhood. Upon entering Palisades Park, the road has an interchange with Route 93 before reaching a diamond interchange with US 1/9.

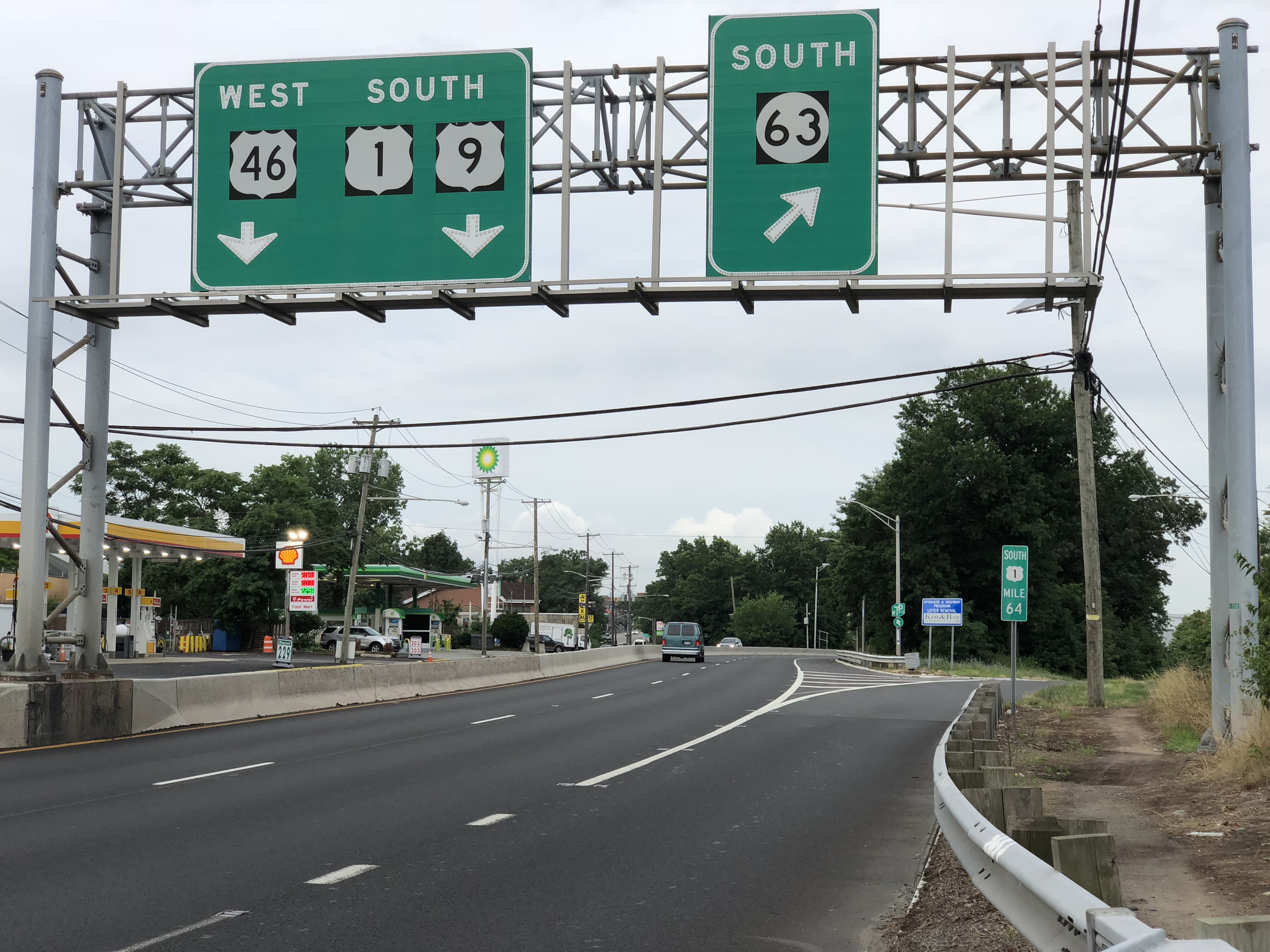
US 1/9 southbound and US 46 westbound at Route 63 interchange in Fort Lee

US 46 continues southeast as a four-lane divided highway, with the US 1/9 ramps following the route a short distance before merging into the route. At this point, US 1/9 runs concurrently with US 46 and the highway makes a sharp turn to the north-northeast. The road has an interchange to the 5th Street and 6th Street frontage roads, which parallel the highway through residential areas and provide access to CR 501. US 1-9/US 46 continues into Fort Lee, where it has access to a couple commercial areas via RIRO before encountering the northern terminus of Route 63 at a westbound exit and eastbound entrance. From here, the highway continues past more businesses and homes with RIRO access, angling northeast as it comes to an exit for Main Street. Immediately past this point, the road turns east and encounters a complex interchange with I-95, the eastern terminus of Route 4, and the southern terminus of US 9W. Here, US 1-9/US 46 all join I-95 (although US 46 is unsigned east of this interchange) and continue to the southeast along a multilane freeway with local-express lane configuration consisting of four local lanes and four express lanes in each direction, passing numerous high-rise buildings. The road has an interchange with Route 67 at GWB Plaza before coming to an interchange for the Palisades Interstate Parkway. After the Palisades Interstate Parkway, the road crosses the Hudson River on the George Washington Bridge, which has eight lanes total on the upper deck (formed from the express lanes) and six lanes total on the lower deck (formed from the local lanes). At the New Jersey–New York state line on the bridge, US 46 ends while I-95 and US 1-9 continue into the borough of Manhattan in New York City.

== History ==
=== Before 1916 ===
What is now US 46 west of Netcong was part of the Manunkachunk Trail, an old Lenape trail running from the Great Minisink Trail in Netcong west to Manunkachunk Village, now Belvidere. Another Lenape trail extended from Netcong to what is now Parsippany and Springfield Township. In 1809, the Parsippany and Rockaway Turnpike was chartered to extend from the Newark-Pompton Turnpike to the Union Turnpike; the section east from Denville was later named Bloomfield Avenue. A branch of the Union Turnpike was chartered in 1813 to run west from Dover to the Morris Turnpike; it was locally known as the Dover Turnpike. By 1920, the portion of the modern route west of Hackettstown was signed as an easterly extension of the Lackawanna Trail, running through Pennsylvania to Binghamton, New York. This designation was removed by 1924, when the state of Pennsylvania rerouted the highway south to Philadelphia.

=== Routes 5, 10 and 12: 1916–1927 ===
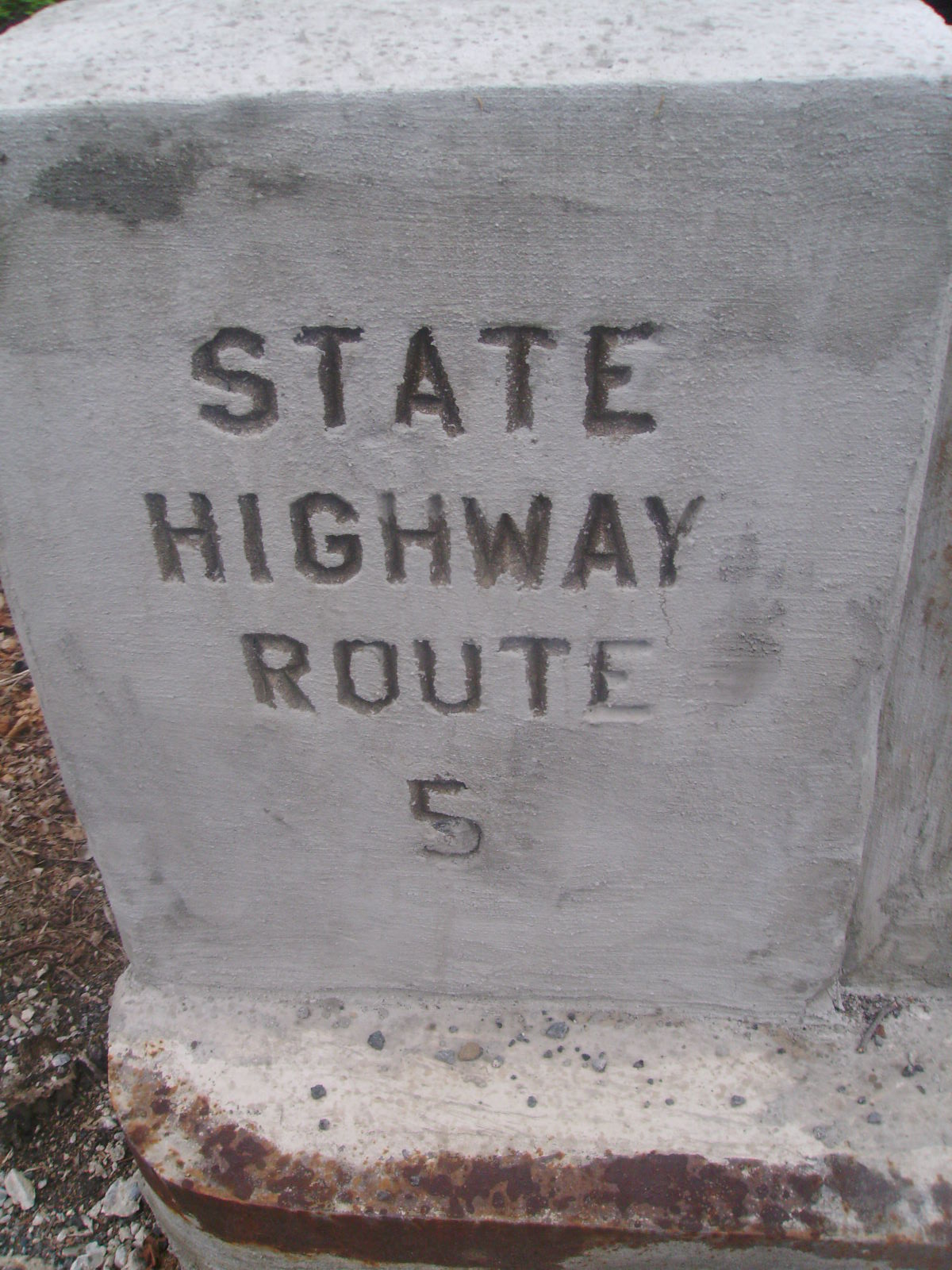
Bridge stamp for pre-1927 Route 5 along Route 163 (former US 46)

Prior to 1927, what is today US 46 was followed by three different routes. The first route was pre-1927 Route 5, which was first legislated in 1916. It began by crossing the Delaware River from Pennsylvania at the community of Delaware. Several undercrossings of the Delaware, Lackawanna and Western Railroad near Delaware were bypassed with a short new road on the southwest side of the railroad. From there, Route 5 used the existing Delaware Road to north of Belvidere, then the Buttzville-Belvidere Road to Buttzville, the Buttzville Road to Great Meadows, and the Danville Mountain Road to Hackettstown.

From Hackettstown to Denville, Route 5 ran concurrently with pre-1927 Route 12, which was first legislated in 1917. A mostly-new road (now eastbound US 46) was built from Hackettstown east to Netcong to avoid steep grades on the existing roads. Portions of the existing Budd's Lake Road were used between Budd Lake and Netcong. From Netcong the route used the old Morris Turnpike to Ledgewood and the Dover Turnpike to Dover, running into Dover on Blackwell Street. Blackwell Street led to Rockaway Road, becoming Main Street in Rockaway, from which it used the old Parsippany and Rockaway Turnpike to Denville.

At Denville, Route 5 turned south, while Route 12 continued east along the Parsippany and Rockaway Turnpike to Pine Brook. The route left the old turnpike there to head northeast towards Paterson, starting with the Pine Brook Road (now Fairfield Road and Little Falls Road) to Little Falls. A bypass was planned around the south side of Little Falls, taking it under the Erie Railroad at Union Boulevard. From there Route 12 would use Union Boulevard, Totowa Road and McBride Avenue into Paterson. Pre-1927 Route 10, which was legislated in 1917, continued east on Market Street on the other side of Paterson to Edgewater, where it connected to the Fort Lee Ferry across the Hudson River. The new alignments were generally built as planned, except at Little Falls, where a bypass was to be built for Route 12.

=== Route 6: 1927–1953 ===
Route 6
- Location: Delaware–Fort Lee
- Existed: 1927–1953

The expansion of the highway system followed the opening of the George Washington Bridge.

In the 1927 renumbering, Route 6 was assigned to the route across northern New Jersey, using the old Route 5 from Delaware to Netcong, Route 12 from Hackettstown to Paterson, and a generally new alignment parallel to Route 10 from Paterson to the proposed George Washington Bridge; the old Route 10 alignment between Paterson and Edgewater was to become Route 5. In Paterson, Route 6 was marked along McBride Avenue, Spruce Street and Market Street.

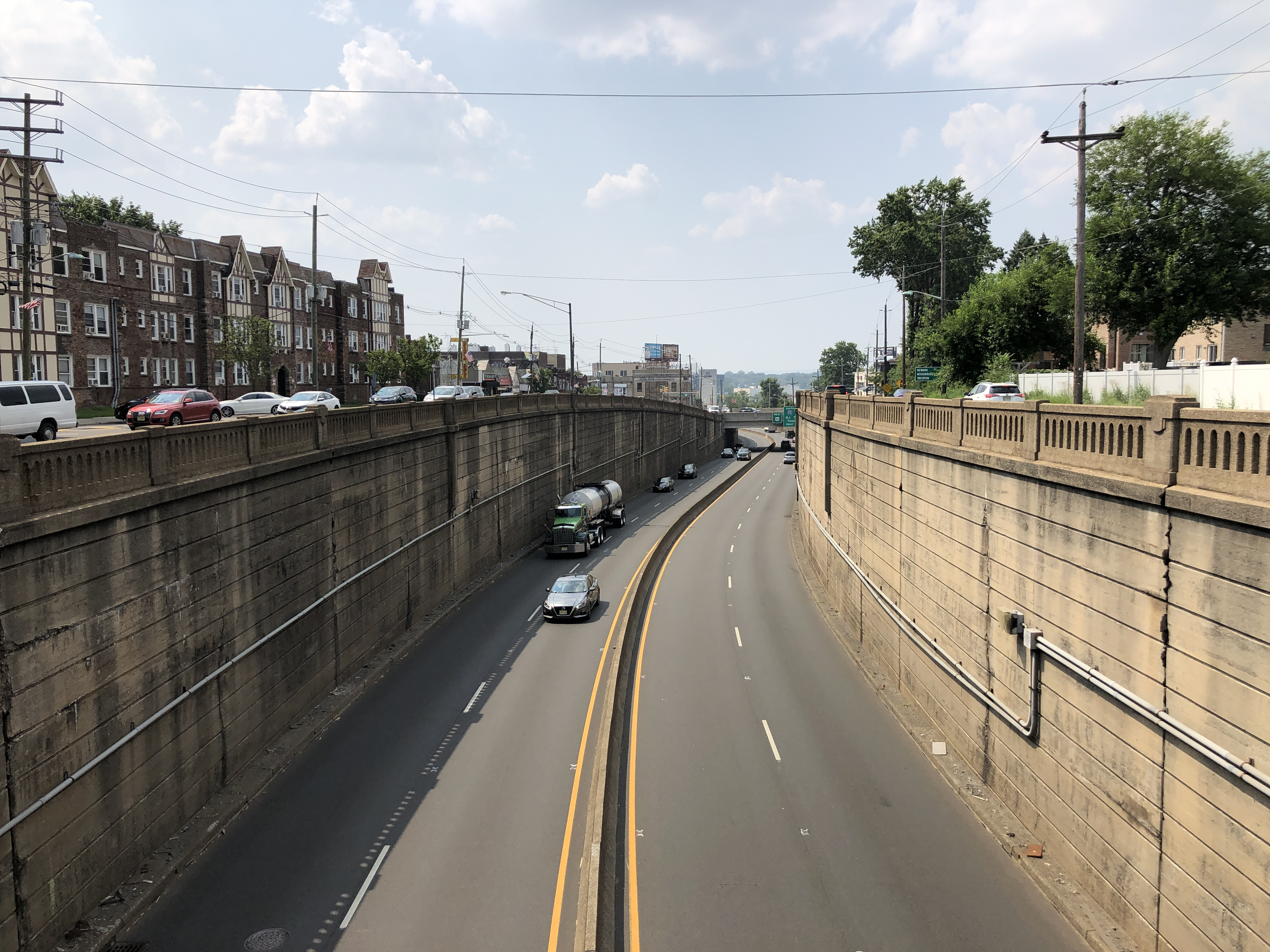
US 46 westbound in Palisades Park

Route 6 was redefined in 1929 to use none of the old road east of Paterson (it had formerly been planned to use Market Street west of roughly where Route 17 now crosses it), and Route 5 was cut back to run only east from Ridgefield. The portion of pre-1927 Route 10 that was bypassed by Route 6 was designated Route 10N, but was eventually removed from the state highway system. In addition, Route 6 was redefined to bypass Paterson to the south. The new route would enter Paterson just south of Market Street, but then turn south and southwest before heading back west to rejoin the old route at the east end of the Little Falls bypass at the Union Boulevard crossing. The old road along Union Boulevard towards Paterson was assigned Route S6, as a spur of Route 6. Route S6 became Route 62 in the 1953 renumbering, and has since been truncated to a short piece between US 46 and I-80 in Totowa.

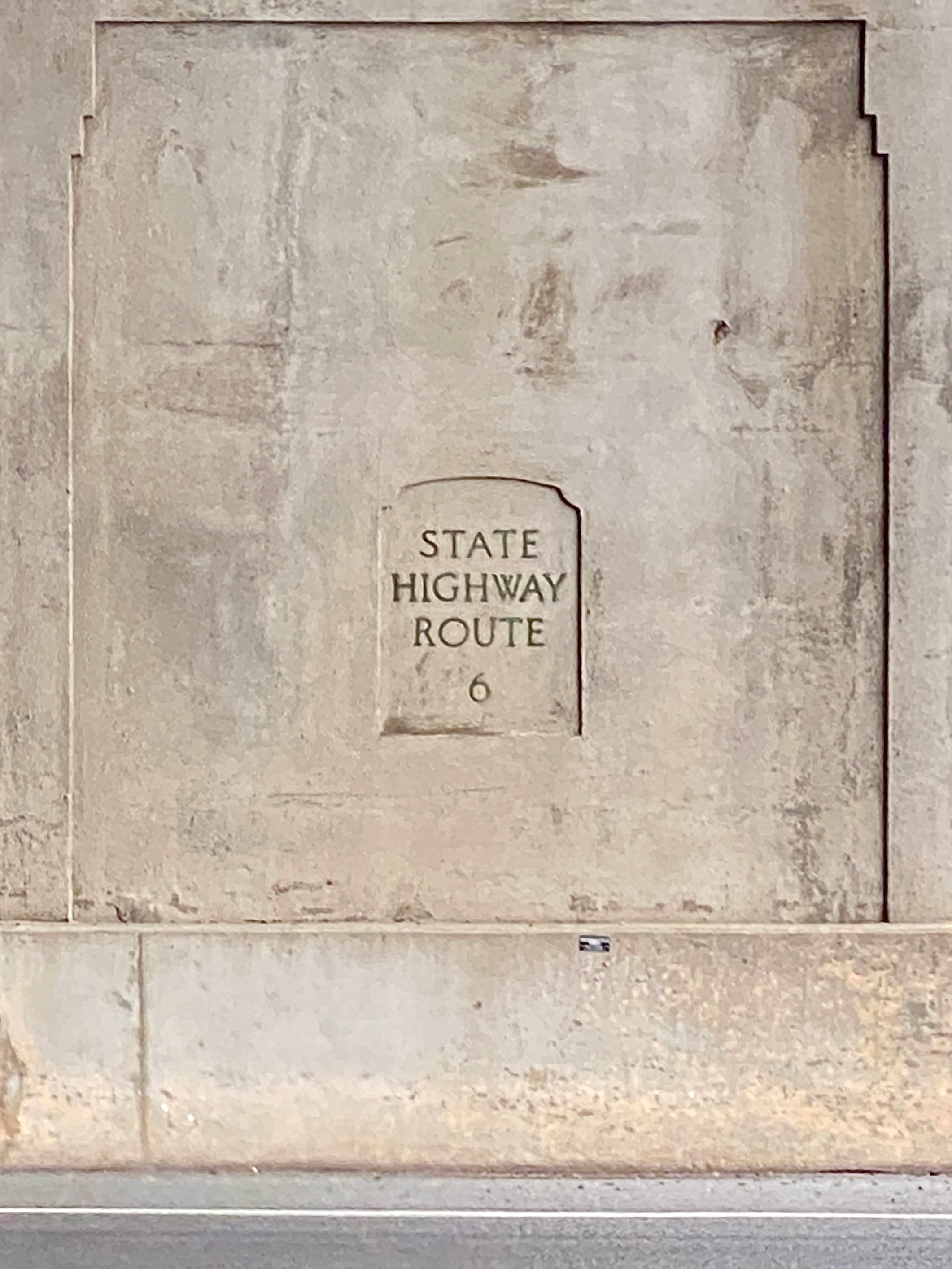
Original Route 6 highway stamp in Totowa

In December 1937, a section of highway was opened from the Passaic River at Clifton to Hasbrouck Heights, marking the completion of Route 6 with the exception of the Paterson bypass. In 1938, a spur of Route 6 called Route 6A was legislated to run from Route 6 in Dover north to US 206/Route S31 in Lafayette Township; this became Route 15 in 1953. A realignment at the Passaic River crossing near Pine Brook was built in the 1940s, along with a new road for a short distance west from Pine Brook. Also in the 1940s, the road was widened west into Denville, and a bypass of downtown Denville, including an interchange at Route 5N (now Route 53) was built. The Route 6 designation was dropped in favor of US 46 in the 1953 renumbering.

By Joint Resolution No. 1, approved April 14, 1941, the New Jersey Legislature designated the highway as the United Spanish War Veterans Memorial Highway in honor of the United Spanish War Veterans.

=== U.S. Route 46: 1936–present ===
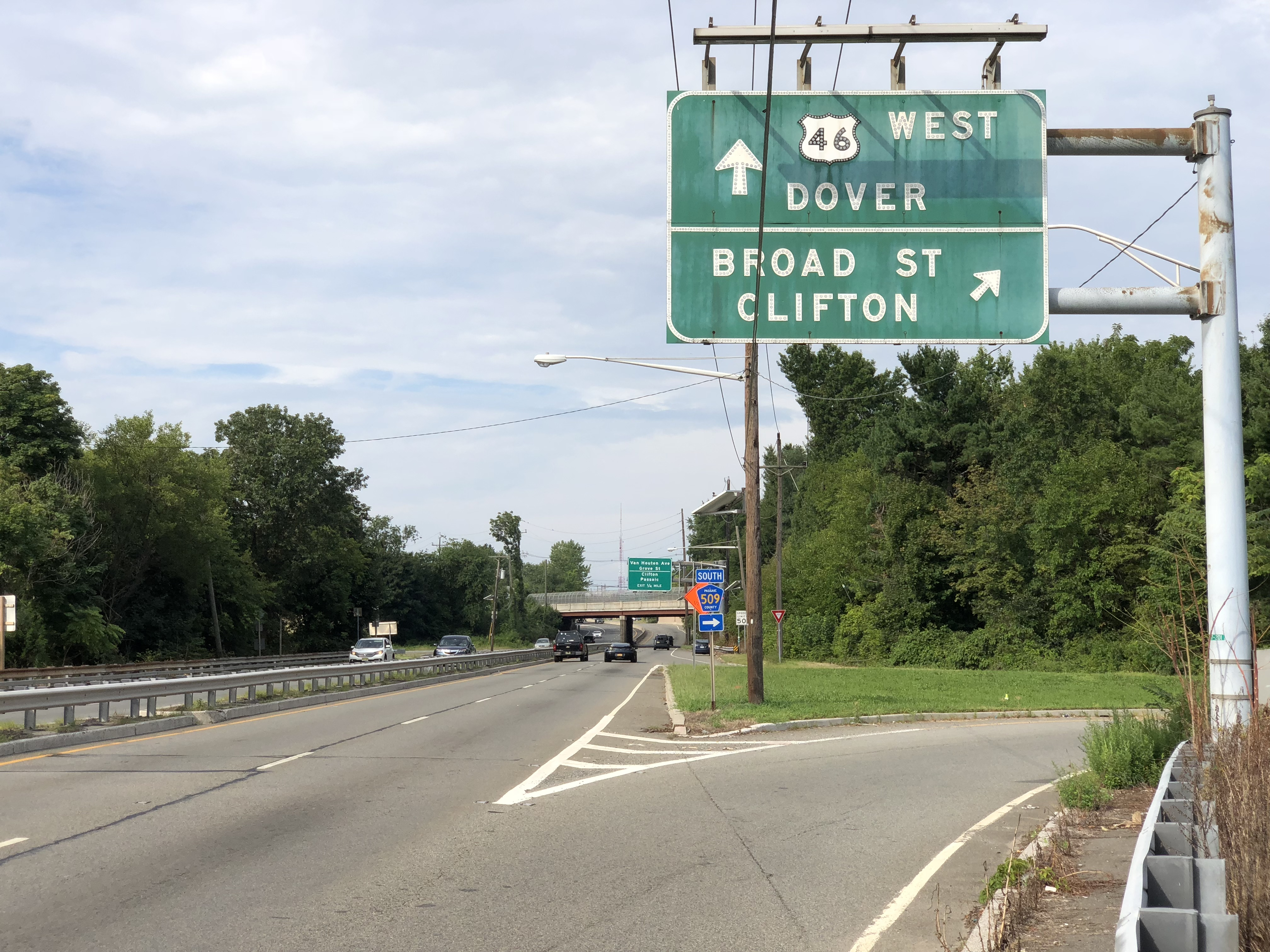
US 46 westbound at exit for CR 509 southbound in Clifton

In 1925, the US 46 designation was first proposed for a route in Colorado connecting Grand Junction to Limon, but it instead became US 40S. The current US 46 was marked in 1936 between Portland, Pennsylvania, and the George Washington Bridge. At the time, the new Route 6 had not been completed from Route 2 (now Route 17) west to Route S6 (now Route 62), and so US 46 was marked through Paterson until this portion was completed by the 1940s. At the west end of Route 6, US 46 continued over the Delaware River on the Delaware Bridge into Pennsylvania, replacing PA 987 north to Portland, where it ended at U.S. Route 611. The Delaware Water Gap Toll Bridge and its associated freeway to Columbia (now I-80) opened in December 1953, as did the new Portland-Columbia Toll Bridge.

Following this, US 611 was rerouted to cross the river twice in order to use the freeway through the Delaware Water Gap, and US 46 was moved to former Route 94 (pre-1953 Route 8) to end at the Columbia, New Jersey side of the Portland-Columbia Toll Bridge. The former approaches to the Darlington's Bridge, which itself was dismantled by the Delaware River Joint Toll Bridge Commission in 1954, became Route 163 in New Jersey and State Route 1039 in Pennsylvania. The US 611 freeway was designated I-80 by 1960, and US 611 was moved back to its old all-Pennsylvania alignment in 1965, leaving US 46 to end at I-80 and Route 94.

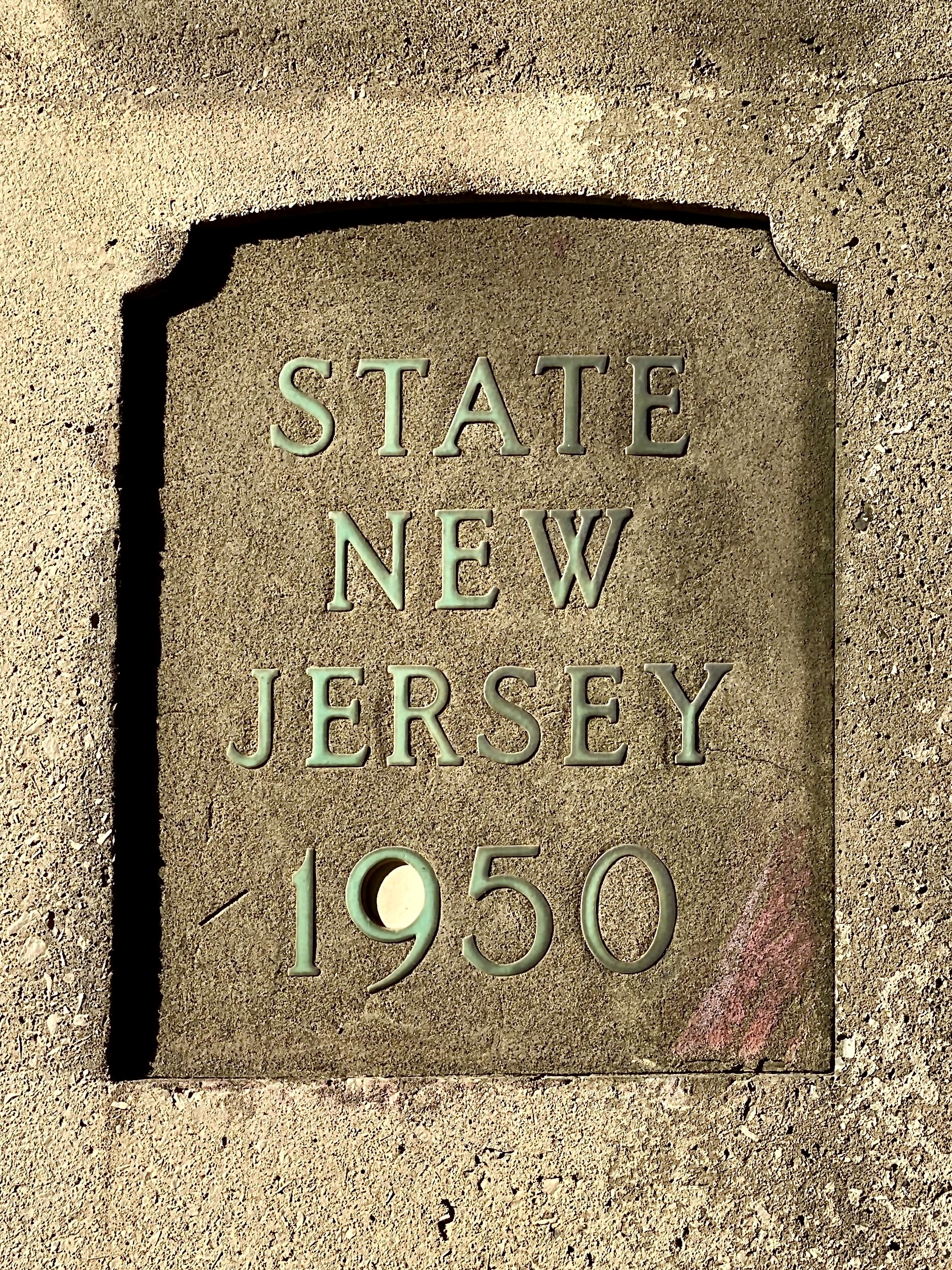
Highway stamp from 1950 in Totowa

In 1964, the approach to the George Washington Bridge, shared with US 1-9, was rebuilt into a freeway that became a part of I-95. Since then, many changes have occurred to US 46. A traffic circle served the intersection with Route 23 until the construction of I-80, and a spaghetti interchange was constructed to replace it. The Little Ferry Circle, initially constructed in 1933, was modified in 1985 to allow US 46 to run straight through the circle. In 1998, the Ledgewood Circle at the western terminus of Route 10 was replaced with a signalized T-intersection. In 2007, the NJDOT announced that they would eliminate the Little Ferry Circle by turning it into a straight intersection; work ran through 2014. The Netcong Circle at Route 183 was replaced with a signalized intersection a cost of $13.3 million in 2013. A temporary junction opened in January of that year with the permanent configuration completed the following August. In addition, the interchange between US 46 and the western terminus of Route 3 is planned to be reconstructed. This project will reconfigure ramps, bring bridges up to standard, and will provide for three-lane connections between Route 3 and US 46. It was announced in 2003 and is projected to cost over $250 million. Construction on the first contract began in December 2015 with completion by October 2019. Construction on the second contract began in February 2020.

The Little Ferry Circle was reconstructed in 1985, creating a through road to let Route 46 traffic pass through the circle without causing congestion.

In 1988 the Legislature resolved that "The Commissioner of Transportation shall designate that portion of United States Highway Route 46 located between Hope Road and Barkers Mill Road in the township of Independence, Warren County as 'Clifford Jones Avenue'," honoring United States Army Specialist Clifford Jones, Jr., a resident of Independence Township who had been killed in action in 1968 during the Vietnam War.

The Little Ferry Circle was widened in 1998; this involved condemnation of adjacent properties and led to a 73-page court decision.

In March 2007, the New Jersey Department of Transportation proposed its latest plan to address issues at the circle. The plan would realign the circle into a straight intersection, complete with turning lanes; prohibit left turns onto many residential streets; and would include construction of a pump station to move water off the oft-flooded highway and into the Hackensack River.

The circle's redesign was completed in 2016. However, according to the Little Ferry police and business owners at the new intersection, car accidents still occur, though they are less deadly than before. The proprietors at the site also claim to have lost a significant amount of business due to reduced accessibility to their establishments, caused by the redesign and loss of the former circle.

== Major intersections ==
County	Location	mi	km	Exit	Destinations	Notes
Warren	Knowlton Township	0.00	0.00		I-80 / Route 94 to PA 611 – Columbia, Blairstown, New York City, Delaware Water Gap, Portland, PA	Western terminus; access to Columbia via Decatur Street; Route 94 south not signed; exit 4B on I-80
Warren	Knowlton Township	2.86	4.60		Lackawanna Road (Route 163 north)	
Warren	White Township	8.86	14.26		CR 519 (Bridgeville Road) – Blairstown, Hope, Alpha	
Warren	White Township	10.03	16.14		Route 31 south – Trenton, Washington	Northern terminus of Route 31
Warren	Hackettstown	21.26	34.21		CR 517 north (High Street) to I-80	Western end of CR 517 concurrency
Warren	Hackettstown	21.70	34.92		Route 182 south / CR 517 south (Mountain Avenue) to Route 57 – Phillipsburg	Eastern end of CR 517 concurrency
Morris	Netcong	29.45– 29.47	47.40– 47.43		I-80 east (U.S. Route 206 south) – Denville, New York City	Eastbound exit and westbound entrance; exit 26 on I-80
Morris	Netcong	30.21– 30.29	48.62– 48.75		Route 183 to US 206 – Netcong, Newton, Somerville, Princeton	Former Netcong Circle
Morris	Roxbury Township	31.48	50.66		I-80 – Lake Hopatcong, Landing	Westbound exit and eastbound entrance; exit 28 on I-80
Morris	Roxbury Township	33.33	53.64		Route 10 east – Whippany	Western terminus of Route 10
Morris	Dover	37.91	61.01		Blackwell Street (CR 659 east) – Dover Business Area	Interchange; eastbound exit and westbound entrance
Morris	Dover	38.17	61.43		Route 15 north (West Clinton Street) – Sparta	Southern terminus of Route 15
Morris	Rockaway Township	39.85	64.13		CR 513 (West Main Street / Dover Rockaway Road) – Rockaway, Chester	
Morris	Denville	42.36	68.17		I-80 west – Netcong, Delaware Water Gap	Westbound exit and eastbound entrance; exit 38 on I-80
Morris	Denville	43.03	69.25		I-80 east / Route 53 south	Interchange; I-80 not signed; northern terminus of Route 53; access to Denville via East Main Street
Morris	Parsippany–Troy Hills				CR 654 south (Cherry Hill Road) to I-80 – Delaware Water Gap, Paterson, New York City	
Morris	Parsippany–Troy Hills	46.33	74.56		I-287 / US 202 (Parsippany Boulevard) – Butler, Whippany, Mahwah	No eastbound access to I-287 north; exit 42 on I-287
Morris	Parsippany–Troy Hills				I-80 east / I-287 north	Access via Smith Road; exit 43B on I-80; exit 41A on I-287
Morris	Parsippany–Troy Hills	49.21– 49.39	79.20– 79.49		I-80 to I-287 – Delaware Water Gap, Paterson, New York City	Same-directional access only; exit 47 on I-80
Morris	Montville	51.54– 51.57	82.95– 82.99		Route 159 east (Bloomfield Avenue) – The Caldwells, Newark	Interchange; no westbound exit; western terminus of Route 159
Essex	Fairfield Township	52.54	84.55		Route 159 west (Clinton Road)	Eastern terminus of Route 159
Essex	Fairfield Township	53.10	85.46		Fairfield Road (CR 615)	Interchange; westbound exit and entrance
Essex	Fairfield Township	53.92	86.78		CR 625 (Hollywood Avenue)	Interchange
Essex	Fairfield Township	54.48– 54.69	87.68– 88.02		Fairfield Road (CR 615) / Two Bridges Road / Passaic Avenue (CR 613) – Lincoln Park, The Caldwells	Interchange
Passaic	Wayne	55.61	89.50		Willowbrook Boulevard	Interchange
Passaic	Wayne	55.98– 56.37	90.09– 90.72		I-80 / Route 23 – Verona, Delaware Water Gap, Butler	Interchange; no westbound access to I-80 east; exit 53 on I-80
Passaic	Totowa	57.02	91.76		CR 640 (Riverview Drive) – Little Falls, Wayne	Interchange
Passaic	Totowa	57.58	92.67		Route 62 north / CR 646 (Union Boulevard) – Totowa, Little Falls	Interchange; southern terminus of Route 62
Passaic	Little Falls	58.04	93.41		CR 639 (Paterson Avenue / McBride Avenue) – Little Falls, Woodland Park	Interchange
Passaic	Little Falls	58.73	94.52		Browertown Road (CR 635) – Woodland Park, Little Falls	Interchange
Passaic	Little Falls	59.06	95.05		Lower Notch Road	Interchange
Passaic	Little Falls	59.34	95.50		Great Notch, Cedar Grove, Little Falls	Interchange; access via CR 633
Passaic	Little Falls	59.63	95.97		Clove Road (CR 620) – Little Falls, Montclair, Montclair State University	Interchange; eastbound exit and entrance
Passaic	Clifton	60.06– 60.24	96.66– 96.95		Route 3 east to G.S. Parkway south – Secaucus	Interchange; eastbound exit and westbound entrance; western terminus of Route 3
Passaic	Clifton	60.06– 60.24	96.66– 96.95		Valley Road (CR 621)	Interchange
Passaic	Clifton	60.91	98.03		Van Houten Avenue (CR 614) / Grove Street (CR 623) – Clifton, Passaic	Interchange
Passaic	Clifton	61.30– 61.39	98.65– 98.80		G.S. Parkway north	Eastbound exit and westbound entrance; exit 154 on G.S. Parkway
Passaic	Clifton	61.30– 61.39	98.65– 98.80		G.S. Parkway south / Route 19 north / CR 509 (Broad Street) – Clifton, Paterson	Interchange; no eastbound access to G.S. Parkway; exit 154 on G.S. Parkway
Passaic	Clifton	61.75	99.38		Paulison Avenue (CR 618) / Hazel Street (CR 702)	Interchange
Passaic	Clifton	62.36	100.36	Western end of freeway section		
Passaic	Clifton	62.36	100.36		Piaget Avenue (CR 628 east) to Main Avenue (CR 601) – Botany Village	No westbound exit
Passaic	Clifton	63.27	101.82		Route 21 south / Lexington Avenue – Newark	Southbound exit and northbound entrance; northern terminus of Route 21
Passaic	Clifton	63.58– 63.85	102.32– 102.76		G.S. Parkway south / Route 20 north / Crooks Avenue (CR 630 west) to I-80 – Paterson	Southern terminus of Route 20; no eastbound access to GSP/CR 630; exit 156 on G.S. Parkway
Bergen	Elmwood Park	64.07	103.11		CR 507 (River Drive) – Garfield, Ridgewood	
Bergen	Elmwood Park	64.07	103.11	Eastern end of freeway section		
Bergen	Elmwood Park	64.41	103.66		G.S. Parkway south	Westbound exit and eastbound entrance; exit 157 on G.S. Parkway
Bergen	Elmwood Park	64.41	103.66		G.S. Parkway north	Eastbound exit and westbound entrance; exit 157 on G.S. Parkway
Bergen	Saddle Brook	66.03	106.26		Outwater Lane (CR 42) – Garfield, Passaic	Interchange
Bergen	Lodi	66.56	107.12		Main Street (CR 61) – Lodi, Rochelle Park	Interchange
Bergen	Hasbrouck Heights	67.62	108.82		Boulevard (CR 57 north) to Route 17	Interchange; eastbound exit and entrance
Bergen	Hasbrouck Heights				Terrace Avenue – Hackensack, Mahwah	Interchange; eastbound exit and entrance
Bergen	Hasbrouck Heights	68.01– 68.11	109.45– 109.61		Route 17 – Newark, Paramus	Interchange; no eastbound exit
Bergen	Teterboro	68.27	109.87		Green Street – Hackensack	Interchange
Bergen	Little Ferry	69.52	111.88		CR 503 (Liberty Street) – Hackensack, Moonachie	
Bergen	Ridgefield Park	70.68– 70.97	113.75– 114.22		I-95 Toll south / N.J. Turnpike south / Teaneck Road (CR 39) to I-80 west	Interchange; no eastbound access to I-80; exit 68 on I-95 / Turnpike
Bergen	Palisades Park	71.65	115.31		Route 93 (Grand Avenue)	Interchange
Bergen	Palisades Park	71.94– 72.09	115.78– 116.02		US 1-9 south (Broad Avenue)	Interchange; western end of US 1-9 concurrency
Bergen	Palisades Park	72.61	116.85		CR 501 (East Central Boulevard) – Palisades Park	Interchange; access via 5th/6th Streets
Bergen	Fort Lee	73.17	117.76		Route 63 south (Bergen Boulevard)	Interchange; eastbound exit and westbound entrance; northern terminus of Route 63
Bergen	Fort Lee	73.71	118.62		Main Street (CR 56) – Fort Lee, Leonia	Interchange
Bergen	Fort Lee	74.18	119.38	Western end of freeway section		
Bergen	Fort Lee	74.18	119.38		US 9W north / Route 4 west to Palisades Parkway north – Fort Lee	Eastbound exit and westbound entrance; Route 4 not signed
Bergen	Fort Lee	74.33	119.62	72B	I-95 south / N.J. Turnpike south / Route 4 west to I-80 west / G.S. Parkway – Hackensack, Paterson	Westbound exit and eastbound entrance; southern end of I-95 concurrency; northern terminus of N.J. Turnpike; eastern terminus of Route 4
Bergen	Fort Lee	74.49	119.88	73	Route 67 / Hudson Terrace (CR 505) to US 9W / Palisades Parkway north – Fort Lee	Signed for US 9W/Hudson Terrace southbound, Palisades northbound; last northbound exit before toll
Bergen	Fort Lee	74.84	120.44	74	Palisades Parkway north	Westbound exit and eastbound entrance from express lanes; southern terminus of Palisades Parkway
Hudson River		75.34	121.25	George Washington Bridge (eastbound toll; Pay-by-Plate or E-ZPass)		
Hudson River		75.34	121.25		I-95 north / US 1-9 north – New York City	Continuation into New York at the river’s center; eastern end of I-95/US 1-9 concurrency
1.000 mi = 1.609 km; 1.000 km = 0.621 mi: Concurrency terminus; Incomplete access; Tolled

== See also ==
- New Jersey Route 6M
