= Charles H. Flummerfelt =

American politician

Member of the Washington House of Representatives
- In office 1889–1893

Member of the Washington State Senate for the 13th district
- In office 1913–1917

Personal details
- Born: July 31, 1863 Delaware, New Jersey, United States
- Died: September 10, 1931 (aged 68) Seattle, Washington, United States
- Party: Democratic

Charles H. Flummerfelt (July 31, 1863 – September 10, 1931) was an American politician in the state of Washington. He served in the Washington House of Representatives and Washington State Senate.

Flummerfelt was born in the Delaware section of Knowlton Township, New Jersey.
