= New Jersey Route 85 =

Proposed state highway in New Jersey, US

Route 85
- Hoboken Freeway
- The interchange of Interstate 95, U.S. Route 9W, U.S. Route 1, U.S. Route 9, New Jersey Route 4 and New Jersey Route 67 in Fort Lee, and the interchange between Interstate 78 and New Jersey Route 139, the approximate termini of Route 85

Route information
- Maintained by NJDOT
- Length: 7.6 mi (12.2 km)
- Existed: September 1956–1970s (never built)

Major junctions
- South end: I-78 / N.J. Turnpike in Jersey City
- US 1-9 in Jersey City; I-495 in North Bergen
- North end: I-80 / N.J. Turnpike in Fort Lee

Location
- Country: United States
- State: New Jersey
- Counties: Hudson, Bergen

Highway system
- New Jersey State Highway Routes; Interstate; US; State; Scenic Byways
← Route 84	→ Route 87

Route 85, also known as the Hoboken Freeway, was a proposed 7.60-mile-long (12.23 km) limited-access highway in Hudson County and Bergen County, New Jersey. The freeway was planned to begin at an interchange with Interstate 78 near the Holland Tunnel approach in Jersey City, northward through North Bergen on its way to Fort Lee, where the highway would interchange with then-Interstate 80 near the George Washington Bridge.

The original plans for the Hoboken Freeway date to September 1956, when the New Jersey State Highway Department, the New Jersey Turnpike Authority and the Port Authority of New York and New Jersey came to an agreement of a 2.20-mile-long (3.54 km) freeway from Interstate 78 to the Lincoln Tunnel approach. The route's northern terminus would be near the Port Authority's piers in North Bergen. The proposal was given an attempt for interstate highway designation in 1957, which was denied by the Federal Highway Administration. The $9 million freeway proposal was advocated for several years by several agencies, and in 1966, two of these, the Regional Plan Association and the Tri-State Transportation Commission put forward an extension northward to the George Washington Bridge approach in Fort Lee.

== Route description ==
According to the New Jersey Department of Transportation in 1972, the Route 85 Freeway would have begun at an interchange with Interstate 78 (the Newark Bay Extension and the Holland Tunnel Approach) in the community of Jersey City. The route would head northward as an eight-lane freeway, changing to 10 lanes at Sip Avenue. The 10 lanes would be in an express-local format, with two local lanes serving interchanges and three express lanes for faster approaches. The route have its second interchange at the Pulaski Skyway with U.S. Routes 1 and 9 in Jersey City, where it would parallel the congested two-lane Tonnelle Avenue. The route would continue northward, paralleling the New Jersey Turnpike's eastern spur, interchanging with New Jersey Route 3 in North Bergen. Route 85 would continue northward as a 10-lane freeway to an interchange with Interstate 495 (now NJ 495), which would serve access to the Lincoln Tunnel.

At the interchange with New Jersey 495 in North Bergen, the freeway would shrink to two lanes in each direction, using variable medians and wide shoulders. Route 85 would continue northward through North Bergen, interchanging with 69th Street before crossing the county line into Bergen County. There, the four-lane freeway would interchange with U.S. Route 46 in the community of Ridgefield. From there, Route 85 would continue through Bergen County until interchanging with Interstate 80 at the George Washington Bridge approach in Fort Lee. There, the freeway and the Route 85 designation would terminate.

== History ==
On January 20, 1956, the three major agencies in New Jersey regarding transportation, the New Jersey State Highway Department, the New Jersey Turnpike Authority, and the Port Authority of New York and New Jersey reached an agreement to construct a freeway from the Holland Tunnel to the Lincoln Tunnel, which serves both states. The route, known as the Hoboken Freeway, was to start at Interstate 78 and the Newark Bay Extension of the New Jersey Turnpike northward towards the Lincoln Tunnel, where it would also serve the Port Authority's piers in the city of Hoboken. The State Highway Department also put forth a possible extension from the Port Authority docks northward to the Lincoln Tunnel. At the time, the Port Authority and the Turnpike Authority would both pay a percentage to build the highway. This was divided 60–40 with the Turnpike Authority paying the 60% and the Port Authority paying the other 40. The project according to the state agencies would relieve congestion on the New Jersey Turnpike and throughout Hoboken. The original cost to construct the 2.2-mile-long (3.5 km) freeway was situated at about $9 million (1956 USD), but would be up for future changes. Eight months later, on September 20, 1956, it was announced that the Newark Bay Extension of the Turnpike was going to open a week from that day, and that the extension to Hoboken had ballooned to a cost of $18 million (1956 USD) for the first 0.80 miles (1.29 km). This project would also tie in with the construction of a new interchange between the Turnpike and U.S. Route 1 in the general area of current-day New Jersey Route 81 in Elizabeth. A year after the project was announced, the State Highway Department decided that the route should become part of the Interstate highway system along with New Jersey Route 58 (the Essex Freeway) would receive funding to help the commercial areas of northeastern New Jersey. Using Federal Aid Improvement Route 105, which had been originally conceived for New Jersey Route 3, the Federal Highway Administration supported funding for Route 58 (which eventually became Interstate 280 upon completion), but did not support funding the Hoboken Freeway.

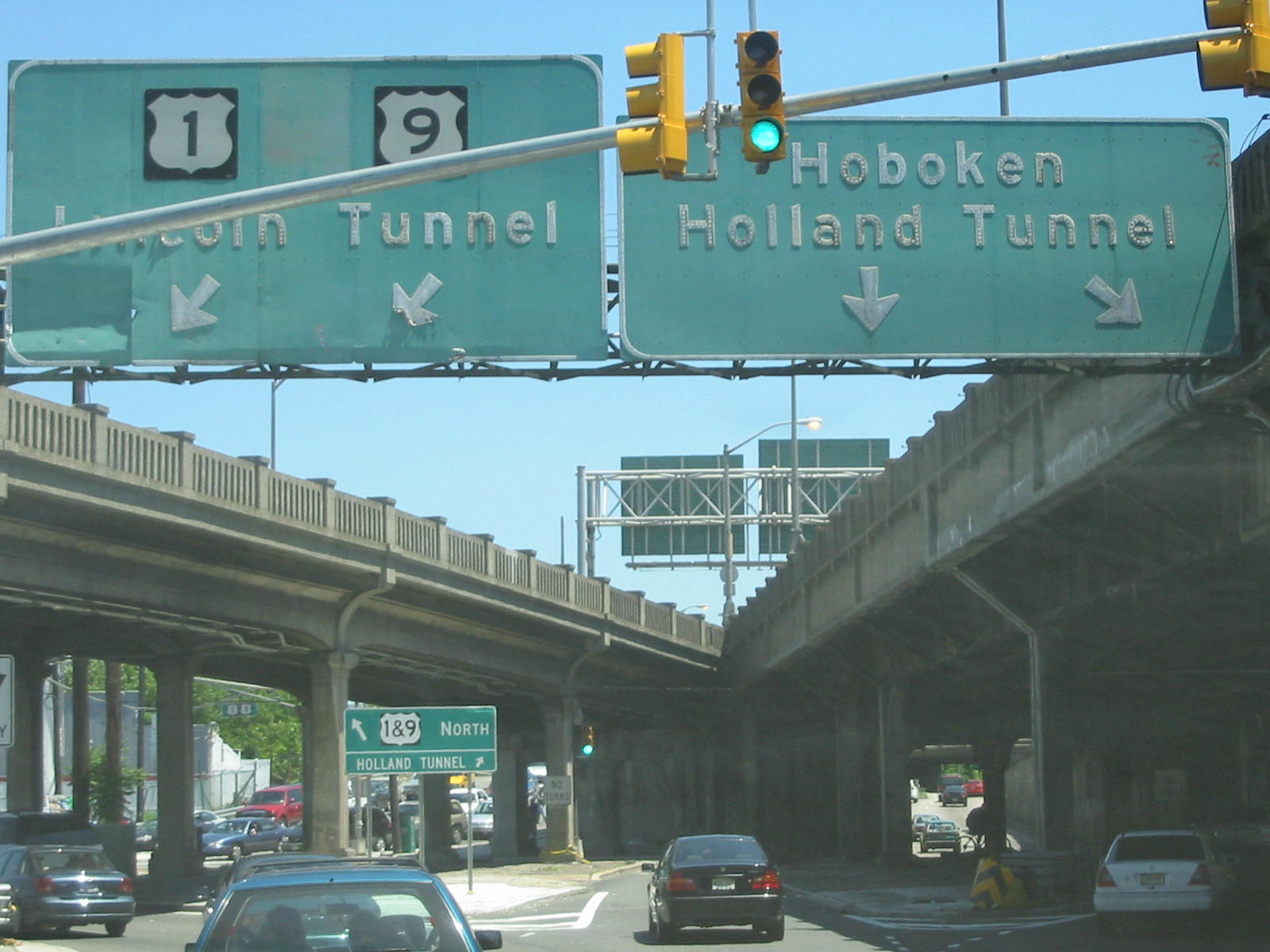
U.S. Route 1 and 9 about to turn on to Tonnelle Avenue at the Tonnelle Circle. Route 85 was supposed to relieve congestion on Tonnelle Avenue

Although the request for Interstate funding did not succeed, the authorities continued to push forward for the Hoboken Freeway throughout the next several years. During that time, the freeway received the Route 85 designation, and the Tri-State Transportation Commission (along with the New Jersey Department of Transportation) released information on the effects of building the new highway. According to the statement, the new freeway would head from the Holland Tunnel Approach in Jersey City northward to Weehawken, where it would meet Interstate 495 at the Lincoln Tunnel. The waterfront highway, as referred to, would serve the heavy industry, high-density population, and the redevelopment for the waterfront. Route 85 would also serve as a backup to Manhattan's West Side Highway (New York State Route 9A) as a controlled access distributor. This would relieve congestion on the West Side Highway and create a backup route between both tunnels. The state of New Jersey passed a bill in 1965 adding the new Route 85 Freeway to the state law.

In 1966, the Tri-State Transportation Commission along with the Regional Plan Association proposed an extension further northward to the George Washington Bridge in Fort Lee. The two agencies saw the proposed freeway as an integral part of starting Hudson River development of the communities in its path. The agencies also noted it would also be an important part of preserving the New Jersey Palisades, a mountain range in northern New Jersey. However, constructing this freeway was halted when problems relating to engineering such a highway, the economic cost, and environmental concerns arose. The political community also had an issue in constructing the highway, as creating a six-lane freeway through the established communities would be daunting. $3 billion (1966 USD) was allocated for the construction of the Route 85 Freeway from the Holland Tunnel to the George Washington Bridge. Local residents demanded an agency be included in the plan to preserve the Palisades and that it be done quick. The proposed price to construct the Route 85 Freeway in 1969 had ballooned from the original $18 million to $110 million (1969 USD).

== Exit list ==
County	Location	mi	km	Exit	Destinations	Notes
Hudson	Jersey City	0.0	0.0	1	I-78 / N.J. Turnpike (Newark Bay Extension)	Proposed southern terminus
Hudson	Jersey City			2	US 1-9 (Pulaski Skyway)	
Hudson	North Bergen			3	Route 3 (Paterson Plank Road)	
Hudson	North Bergen			4	I-495 (Lincoln Tunnel Approach)	Present-day New Jersey Route 495; Originally proposed northern terminus
Hudson	North Bergen			5	69th Street	
Bergen	Ridgefield			6	US 46	
Bergen	Fort Lee	7.6	12.2	7	I-80 / N.J. Turnpike (GW Bridge Approach)	Proposed northern terminus; Now part of Interstate 95
1.000 mi = 1.609 km; 1.000 km = 0.621 mi

== See also ==
- New Jersey Route 185, an unfinished freeway serving the same area as Route 85 would
