= Deepwater, New Jersey =

Populated place in Salem County, New Jersey, US

- Unincorporated community
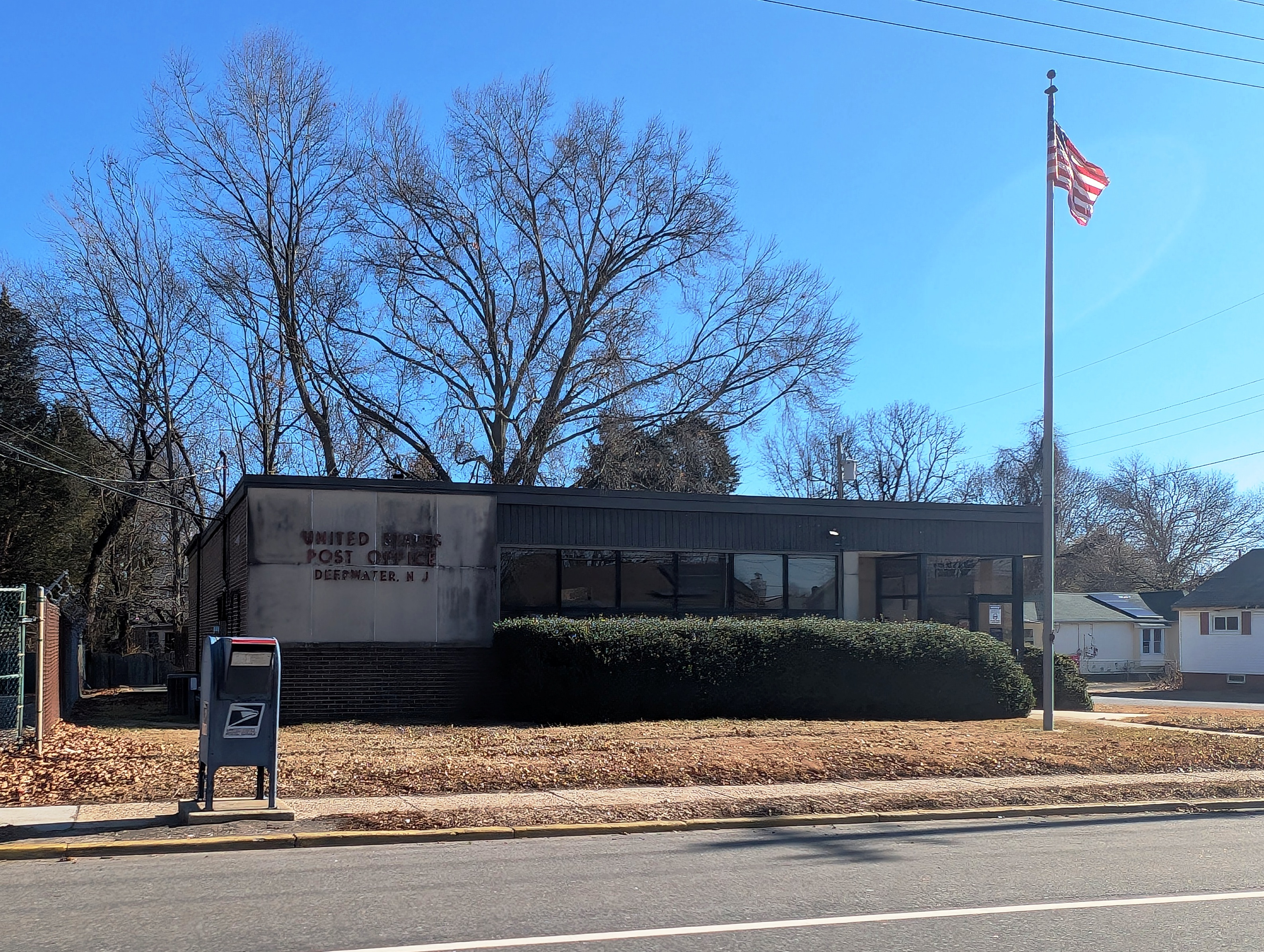
- Deepwater Post Office

- Deepwater's location in Salem County (Inset: Salem County in New Jersey) Deepwater, New Jersey (New Jersey) Deepwater, New Jersey (the United States)
- Coordinates: 39°41′00″N 75°29′26″W
- Country: United States
- State: New Jersey
- County: Salem
- Township: Pennsville
- Elevation: 9.8 ft (3 m)
- ZIP code: 08023
- GNIS feature ID: 0875855

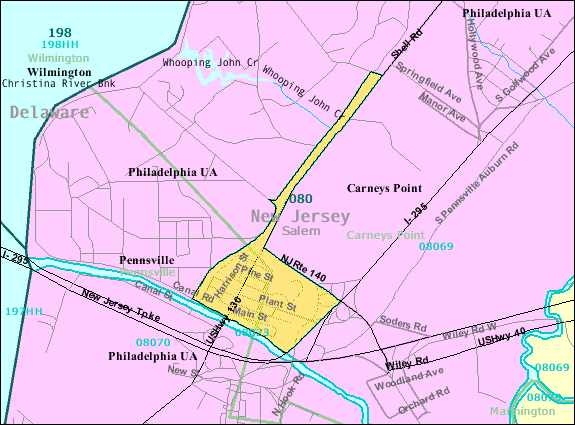
United States Census Bureau map of the 08023 ZIP Code Tabulation Area for Deepwater, New Jersey.

Deepwater is an unincorporated community located within Pennsville Township, in Salem County, in the U.S. state of New Jersey. The community is located at the east end of the Delaware Memorial Bridge. Deepwater is the location of the United States Postal Service area covering ZIP code 08023. According to the 2020–2024 American Community Survey 5-year estimates, ZIP Code Tabulation Area (ZCTA) 08023 had a population of 375.

While the Census Bureau does not track data for ZIP codes, it does gather information for the ZIP Code Tabulation Area (ZCTA), which is designed to approximate the ZIP code. All geographic and Demographic data shown below is for the Deepwater ZCTA.

The community lends its name to the Deepwater Point Running Track, a Conrail line that runs for 3.7 miles (6.0 km) as a continuation of the Penns Grove Secondary.

== Geography ==
According to the United States Census Bureau, the community has a total area of 1 square mile (2.5 km^{2}), all of it land.

== Demographics ==
At the 2000 census there were 345 people, 141 households, and 83 families residing in the ZCTA. The population density was 2,801 people per square mile (1,084.3 per km^{2}). There were 159 housing units at an average density of 1,080.5 per sq mi (418.3 per km^{2}). The racial makeup of the ZCTA was 98.80% White, 1.20% Asian, and 1% from two or more races. Hispanic or Latino of any race were 1.19% of the population.

Of the 1,013 households, 40.8% had children under the age of 18 living with them, 66.2% were married couples living together, 7.1% had a female householder with no husband present, and 24.8% were non-families. 22% of households were one person, and 12.4% were one person aged 65 or older. The average household size was 2.66 and the average family size was 3.14.

In the ZCTA the population was spread out, with 28.4% under the age of 18, 8.7% from 18 to 24, 29.9% from 25 to 44, 20% from 45 to 64, and 13.0% 65 or older. The median age was 35.2 years. For every 100 females, there were 94.9 males. For every 100 females age 18 and over, there were 87.1 males.

The median household income was $40,357 and the median family income was $61,875. Males had a median income of $84,912 versus $43,068 for females. The per capita income for the borough was $45,843. About 0.7% of families and 2.4% of the population were below the poverty line, including 1.4% of those under age 18 and 4.1% of those age 65 or over.
