= Darlington's Bridge at Delaware Station =

Bridge in New Jersey, US

- The area of the Darlington's Bridge. The bridge was south of the current one (marked as "Conrail Railroad") and near where Hemlock Hill Road, Route 163 and Route 46 would get closest to the river in Delaware Station.
- Coordinates: 40°53′58″N 75°04′29″W
- Crosses: Delaware River
- Locale: Delaware, New Jersey and Delaware Water Gap, Pennsylvania
- Official name: Darlington's Bridge at Delaware Station
- Maintained by: Delaware, Lackawanna and Western Railroad (1855–1914); Henry V. Darlington (1914–1932); Delaware River Joint Toll Bridge Commission (1932–1954)

Characteristics
- Design: Truss bridge
- Total length: 740 feet (230 m)
- Load limit: 15 tons (30,000 pounds (14,000 kg))

History
- Opened: 1855 (railroad bridge); December 19, 1914 (highway bridge)
- Closed: April 3, 1954

Statistics
- Toll: $0.25 (until 1932), equal to $5.76 today)

The Darlington's Bridge at Delaware Station was a highway bridge that spanned the Delaware River in the community of Delaware, New Jersey (known locally as Delaware Station).

A railroad bridge built by the Delaware, Lackawanna and Western Railroad in 1871 to replace an earlier 1855 timber span, this bridge was sold off when a new bridge was erected upstream. Henry V. Darlington, an Episcopal minister in Delaware and nearby Belvidere offered to buy the second-hand bridge for $5,000 (1914 USD, equal to $156,960 today). Darlington converted it into a highway bridge, using two fired members of the nearby Meyer's Ferry to be toll collectors.

The use of this bridge subsequently increased; as a result, it became part of State Highway Route 6 in 1927 and U.S. Route 46 in 1936. In 1932, during the massive state takeover of bridges by the Delaware River Joint Toll Bridge Commission, Darlington refused buyout offers, bargaining his way up to $275,000 (1932 USD, equal to $6,337,744 today) before accepting the sale. This amount was far greater than the sale prices of the nearby Belvidere-Riverton and Portland-Columbia Covered Bridge, which were accepted for $60,000 (equal to $1,382,780 today) and $50,000 (equal to $1,152,317 today) respectively.

Around that same time, tolls on this bridge and Route 6 were eliminated, and the bridge continued to operate toll-free for twenty-one years, until the Portland-Columbia Toll Bridge was erected upstream at Columbia. The Commission finally ceased operations on the Darlington Bridge on April 3, 1954, and the bridge was immediately demolished.

== History ==
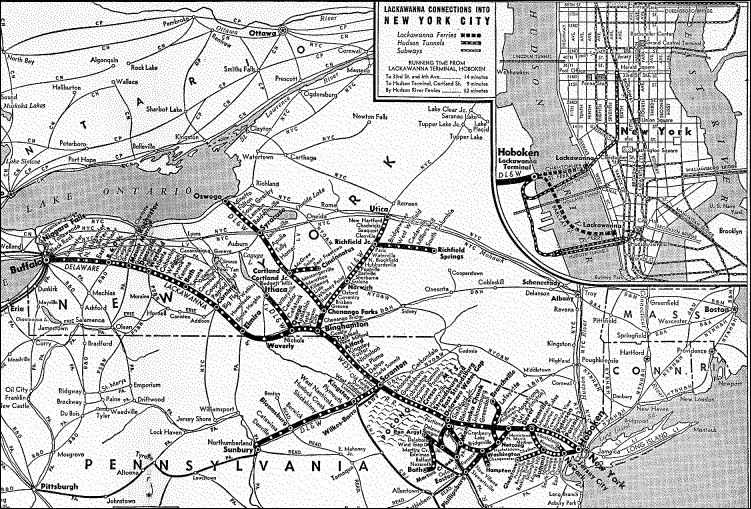
A map of the Delaware, Lackawanna and Western Railroad

=== Railroad bridge ===
As expansion of the Delaware, Lackawanna and Western Railroad (DL&W) continued westward from Hoboken, the railroad company saw the need to build a new bridge over the Delaware River. Reaching the community of Delaware (named after the river nearby), DL&W built a train station previously in the community, denoted as Delaware Station. The new wood bridge was constructed on the railroad mainline during 1855. The structure lasted a short time, until DL&W replaced the wooden crossing for a new 740 feet (230 m) long iron bridge. The new bridge had two tracks to cross the river, serving the local area with coal cars and boxcars crossing. The new bridge survived the floods in 1903 that destroyed many bridges (including the nearby Riverton-Belvidere Bridge) along the Delaware and continued to prosper.

However, as trains, cars and locomotives began to get heavier and larger, the DL&W needed to build a new bridge across the river to support the heavier weights. In 1902, they built the new bridge just upstream for the reason that it would not have to move much track for better service. As soon as the new bridge was finished, DL&W put the former one up for sale. Demand for second-hand bridges were not high at the time, and when Henry V.B. Darlington, a local Episcopal minister, put up an offer of $5,000 (1902 USD) for the bridge, DL&W immediately took the money. The railroad did not check on the background of Reverend Darlington or asked what he wanted to do with the iron structure. His money was "as good as anybody's", according to DL&W.

=== Henry Darlington's ownership ===
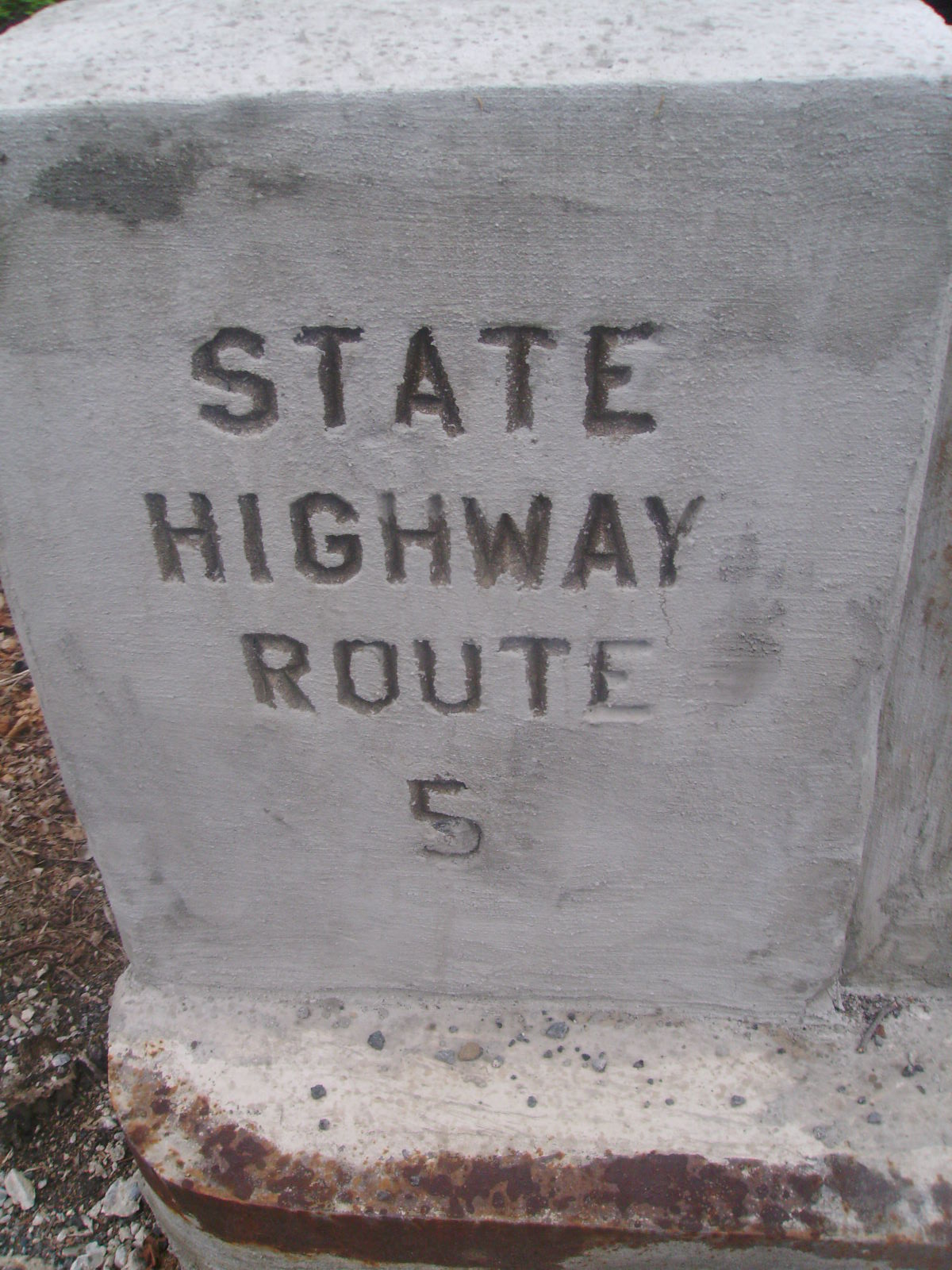
Bridge stamp for pre-1927 Route 5 along Route 163 (former US 46), the approach to the Darlington's Bridge

After Darlington bought the railroad bridge from the Delaware, Lackawanna and Western Railroad he took out the tracks, replacing them with a paved roadway. Darlington knew the automobile was becoming a big entity in the 1910s and 1920s, turning the bridge into a vehicular bridge was an important decision to make the most out of the crossing. He also figured that the bridge would make a good approach for drivers coming to visit the local natural attractions, such as the Delaware Water Gap and the Pocono Mountains. Darlington created new roadway approaches (Lackawanna Road and Ferry Lane) to the bridge and even two buildings on the New Jersey side of the span. One building was for toll collecting while the other was for living quarters. These quarters were soon occupied by Edward McCracken and his wife. McCracken and his wife had come from the Meyer's Ferry, a local ferry service running at that point on the Delaware since the early 18th century. McCracken had been the local ferry operator, but when a large accident occurred during a dinner break killed four passengers, the owner put the ferry under his control and later fired McCracken. Klein later sold the ferry, which Darlington bought and shut down. He immediately hired the McCrackens to work as the toll collectors.

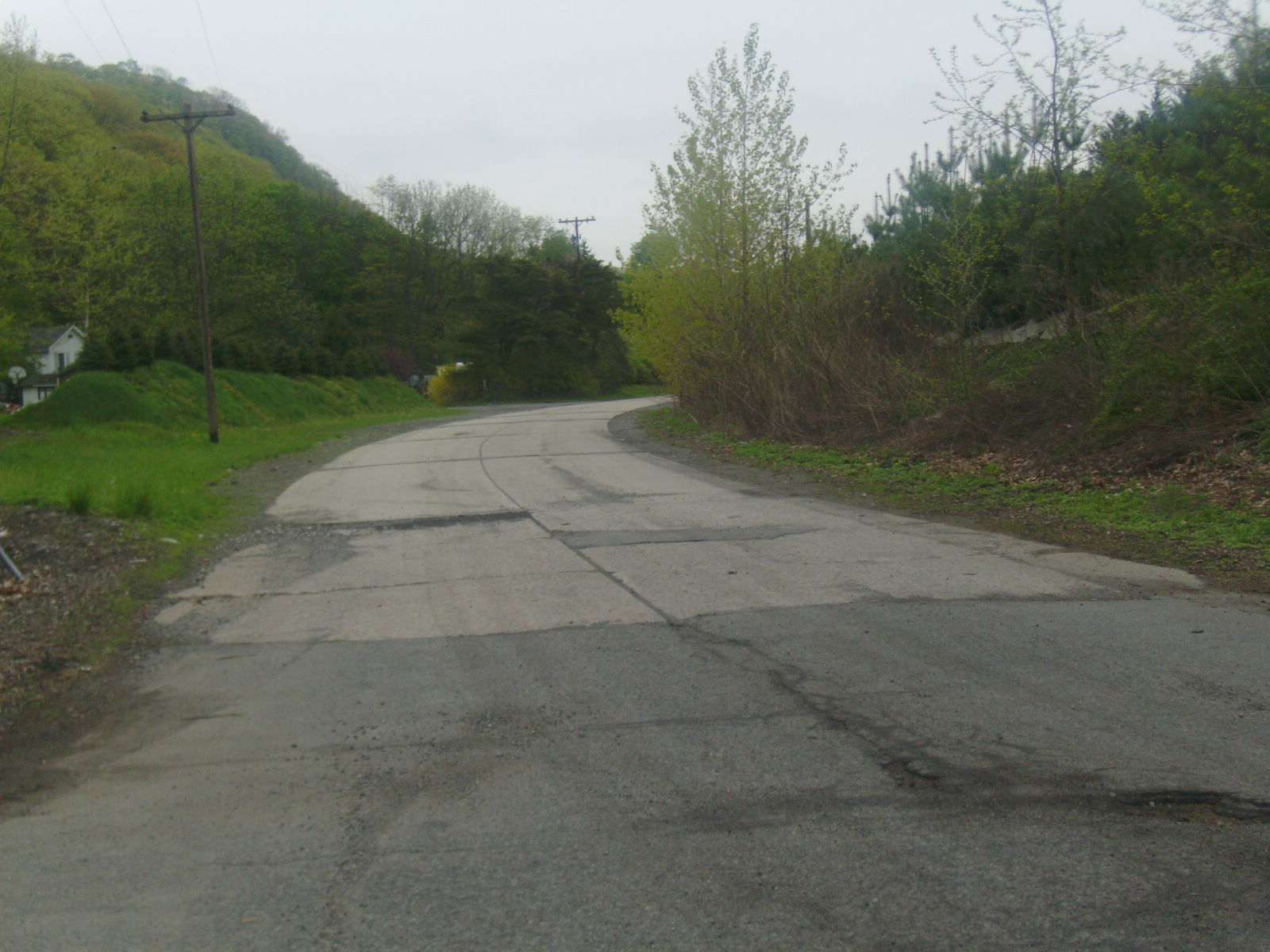
The alignment of Route 163, which was the approach from New Jersey to the Darlington's Bridge

In the meantime, the only other bridge across the Delaware River easily accessible for vehicular use was the covered bridge in Columbia, New Jersey and Portland, Pennsylvania. Drivers heading along the local roads (later designated as State Highway Route 5), often came to Darlington's Bridge first. The McCrackens collected tolls in large bushel baskets, which were often filled to the brim of quarters and half-dollars. Locals said that the McCrackens were sometimes spotted dropping these coins off the bridge and into the river below, although swimmers were never able to find anything of value to support the myth. Even though the bridge made a large sum of a money and the tollhouse was often filled with money, the place was never robbed. Two Airedales the McCrackens kept in the tollhouse, named Duke and Totsey, helped keep the place clear from thieves.

In the time of the bridge prospering, Reverend Darlington was wed to Dorothy Stone Smith at the Trinity Chapel in Newark. The wedding, which occurred in November 1920, made the local news and the ceremony was performed by Darlington's father. Two years later, the Darlingtons made the news again, this time with the birth of their first child (a son) in Orange, New Jersey at Orange Memorial Hospital.

=== Buyout and dismantling ===
The bridge continued to prosper through the 1920s and 1930s with a toll of one quarter to cross the bridge, with drivers of State Highway Route 6 coming along the bridge from the junction with State Highway Route 8 coming across the bridge since 1927. During the 1920s and 1930s, the states of New Jersey and Pennsylvania began to buy out bridges along the Delaware River under the Joint Commission for the Elimination of Toll Bridges. The reconstructed bridge at Belvidere was bought by the commission for $60,000 (1920s USD) and the covered bridge at Columbia for only $50,000. Although the commission tried to buy the second-hand railroad bridge for a lower, unspecified amount, Darlington refused, raising the amount to $275,000. Once the bridge was brought, tolls were eliminated.

Although the bridge remained in service for another 21 years as a free crossing, the Delaware River Joint Toll Bridge Commission constructed a brand new bridge at the Portland-Columbia. The new toll bridge was constructed in 1953 for $4 million (1953 USD, equal to $47,009,950 today), but the toll was only one quarter (equal to $2.94 today), like the former price of the Darlington's Bridge. Darlington, who had retired from his job in Orange in 1950, was alive and was in disbelief. The next April, the Toll Bridge Commission went ahead and dismantled the Darlington's bridge, which was fought by several legal actions. The bridge ceased operations on April 3, 1954, being demolished soon after. The covered bridge at Columbia was destroyed during Hurricane Diane the next August. Just before the demolishing of Darlington's Bridge, the approach on the New Jersey side had been renumbered to State Highway Route 163, which remains in condition from when the bridge was in use.

== See also ==
- List of crossings of the Delaware River
