= Delaware, Warren County, New Jersey =

Census-designated place in Middlesex County, New Jersey, US

Delaware, New Jersey
- Census-designated place
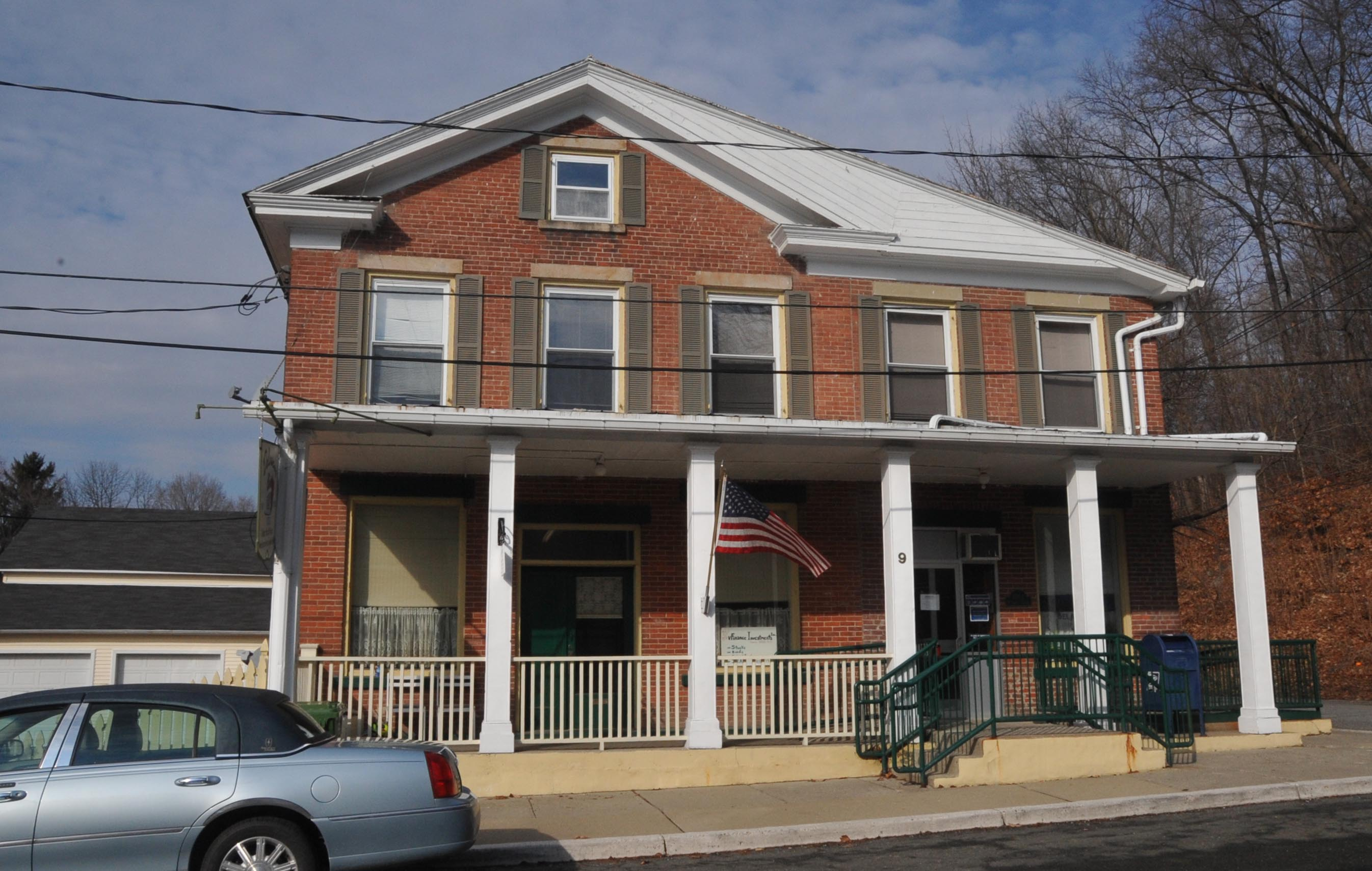
- Delaware Post Office, house built in 1860 by John I. Blair

- Location in Warren County Location in New Jersey Location in the United States
- Coordinates: 40°53′26″N 075°04′00″W
- Country: United States
- State: New Jersey
- County: Warren
- Township: Knowlton

Area
  - Total: 0.410 sq mi (1.063 km^{2})
  - Land: 0.380 sq mi (0.985 km^{2})
  - Water: 0.030 sq mi (0.078 km^{2}) 7.38%
- Elevation: 292 ft (89 m)

Population (2020 census)
  - Total: 173
  - Density: 394.6/sq mi (152.4/km^{2})
- Time zone: UTC−05:00 (Eastern (EST))
  - Summer (DST): UTC−04:00 (EDT)
- ZIP Code: 07833
- Area code: 908
- FIPS code: 34-17200
- GNIS feature ID: 2583982

Delaware (also known as Delaware Station) is an unincorporated community and census-designated place (CDP) located along the Delaware River within Knowlton Township in Warren County, New Jersey. It was created as part of the 2010 United States census. As of the 2010 Census, the CDP's population was 150. The area is served as United States Postal Service ZIP Code 07833.

== History ==
Railroad magnate John I. Blair purchased land in the area and had it surveyed into lots in 1856. The Delaware, Lackawanna and Western Railroad began passenger service in July 1856. A storehouse built by Blair in 1860 was also used as the post office.

== Geography ==
According to the United States Census Bureau, the CDP had a total area of 0.410 square miles (1.063 km^{2}), including 0.380 square miles (0.985 km^{2}) of land and 0.030 square miles (0.078 km^{2}) of water (7.38%).

== Demographics ==
Historical population
Census	Pop.	Note	%±
2010	150		—
2020	173		15.3%
Population sources: 2010 2020

Delaware first appeared as a census designated place in the 2010 U.S. census.

=== 2020 census ===
Delaware CDP, New Jersey – Racial and ethnic composition Note: the US Census treats Hispanic/Latino as an ethnic category. This table excludes Latinos from the racial categories and assigns them to a separate category. Hispanics/Latinos may be of any race.
Race / Ethnicity (NH = Non-Hispanic)	Pop 2010	Pop 2020	% 2010	% 2020
White alone (NH)	121	145	80.67%	83.82%
Black or African American alone (NH)	0	2	0.00%	1.16%
Native American or Alaska Native alone (NH)	0	0	0.00%	0.00%
Asian alone (NH)	7	7	4.67%	4.05%
Native Hawaiian or Pacific Islander alone (NH)	0	0	0.00%	0.00%
Other race alone (NH)	5	1	3.33%	0.58%
Mixed race or Multiracial (NH)	1	4	0.67%	2.31%
Hispanic or Latino (any race)	16	14	10.67%	8.09%
Total	150	173	100.00%	100.00%

=== 2010 census ===
The 2010 United States census counted 150 people, 60 households, and 46 families in the CDP. The population density was 394.6 per square mile (152.4/km^{2}). There were 70 housing units at an average density of 184.1 per square mile (71.1/km^{2}). The racial makeup was 88.67% (133) White, 0.00% (0) Black or African American, 0.00% (0) Native American, 4.67% (7) Asian, 0.00% (0) Pacific Islander, 5.33% (8) from other races, and 1.33% (2) from two or more races. Hispanic or Latino of any race were 10.67% (16) of the population.

Of the 60 households, 30.0% had children under the age of 18; 66.7% were married couples living together; 8.3% had a female householder with no husband present and 23.3% were non-families. Of all households, 18.3% were made up of individuals and 8.3% had someone living alone who was 65 years of age or older. The average household size was 2.50 and the average family size was 2.83.

18.7% of the population were under the age of 18, 6.0% from 18 to 24, 22.7% from 25 to 44, 38.7% from 45 to 64, and 14.0% who were 65 years of age or older. The median age was 45.8 years. For every 100 females, the population had 117.4 males. For every 100 females ages 18 and older there were 110.3 males.

=== 2000 census ===
As of the 2000 United States census, the population for ZIP Code Tabulation Area 07833 was 159.

== Historic district ==
- Delaware Historic District
- U.S. National Register of Historic Places
- U.S. Historic district
- New Jersey Register of Historic Places
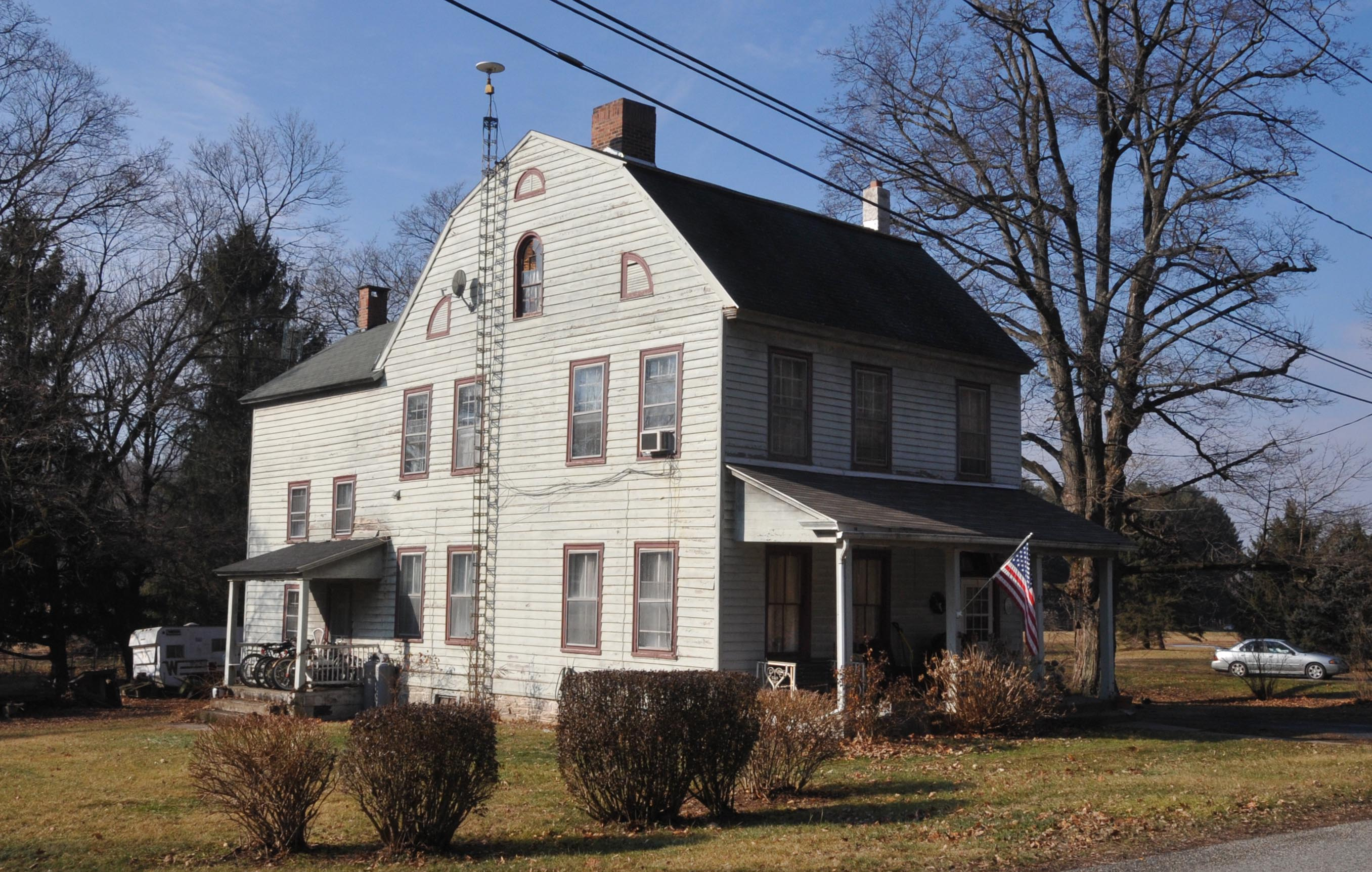
- Dr. Jabez Gwinnup House
- Location: Ann, Clinton, Charles, and Valley Streets, Delaware Road, NJ 46 and Ferry Lane
- Area: 90 acres (36 ha)
- Architectural style: Italianate, Queen Anne
- NRHP reference No.: 03000128
- NJRHP No.: 2766

Significant dates
- Added to NRHP: March 20, 2003
- Designated NJRHP: December 19, 2002

The Delaware Historic District is a 90-acre (36 ha) historic district encompassing the community. It was added to the National Register of Historic Places on March 20, 2003, for its significance in architecture, community development, commerce, transportation, recreation and industry. The district includes 60 contributing buildings, 3 contributing structures, and 3 contributing sites. The Federal-style Dr. Jabez Gwinnup House is one of the oldest houses in the district, built c. 1815.

== Notable people ==
People who were born in, residents of, or otherwise closely associated with Delaware include:

- Charles H. Flummerfelt (1863–1931), politician who served in the Washington House of Representatives and Washington State Senate.

== See also ==
- National Register of Historic Places listings in Warren County, New Jersey
- Darlington's Bridge at Delaware Station
