= Easton-Phillipsburg Bridge =

Easton-Phillipsburg Bridge may refer to:

- Easton–Phillipsburg Toll Bridge
- Northampton Street Bridge
