= Lumberville Historic District =

Historic district in Pennsylvania, United States

- U.S. National Register of Historic Places
- U.S. Historic district
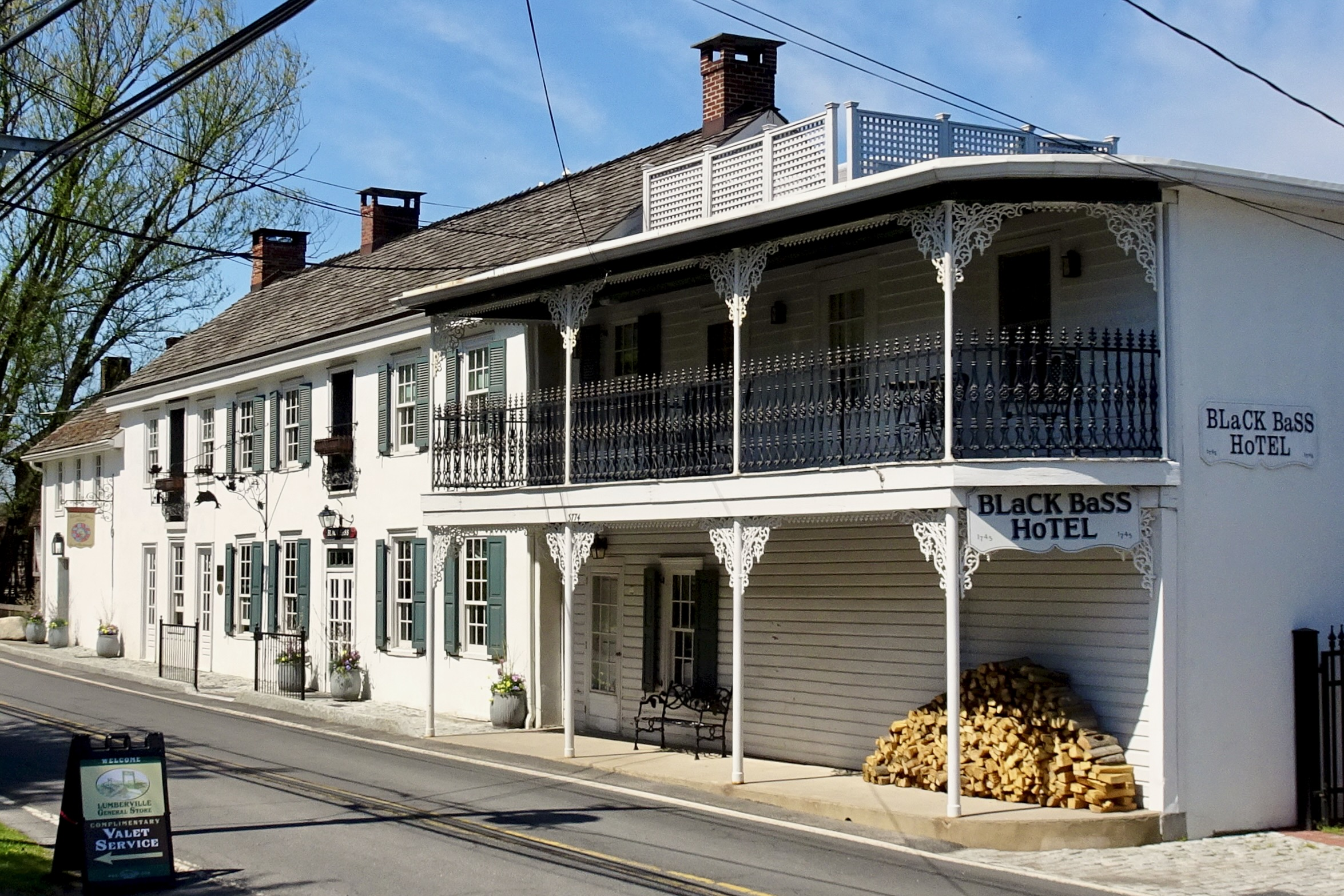
- Black Bass Hotel in April 2016

- Location within Pennsylvania Location within the United States
- Location: Fleecy Dale, Carversville, River, and Green Hill Rds., Lumberville, Solebury Township, Pennsylvania
- Coordinates: 40°24′15″N 75°02′14″W
- Area: 54 acres (22 ha)
- NRHP reference No.: 84003165
- Added to NRHP: August 9, 1984

Lumberville Historic District is a national historic district located in Lumberville, Solebury Township, Bucks County, Pennsylvania. The district includes 85 contributing buildings in the riverfront and canal village of Lumberville. They include a variety of residential, commercial, and institutional buildings.

It was added to the National Register of Historic Places in 1984.

== Gallery ==
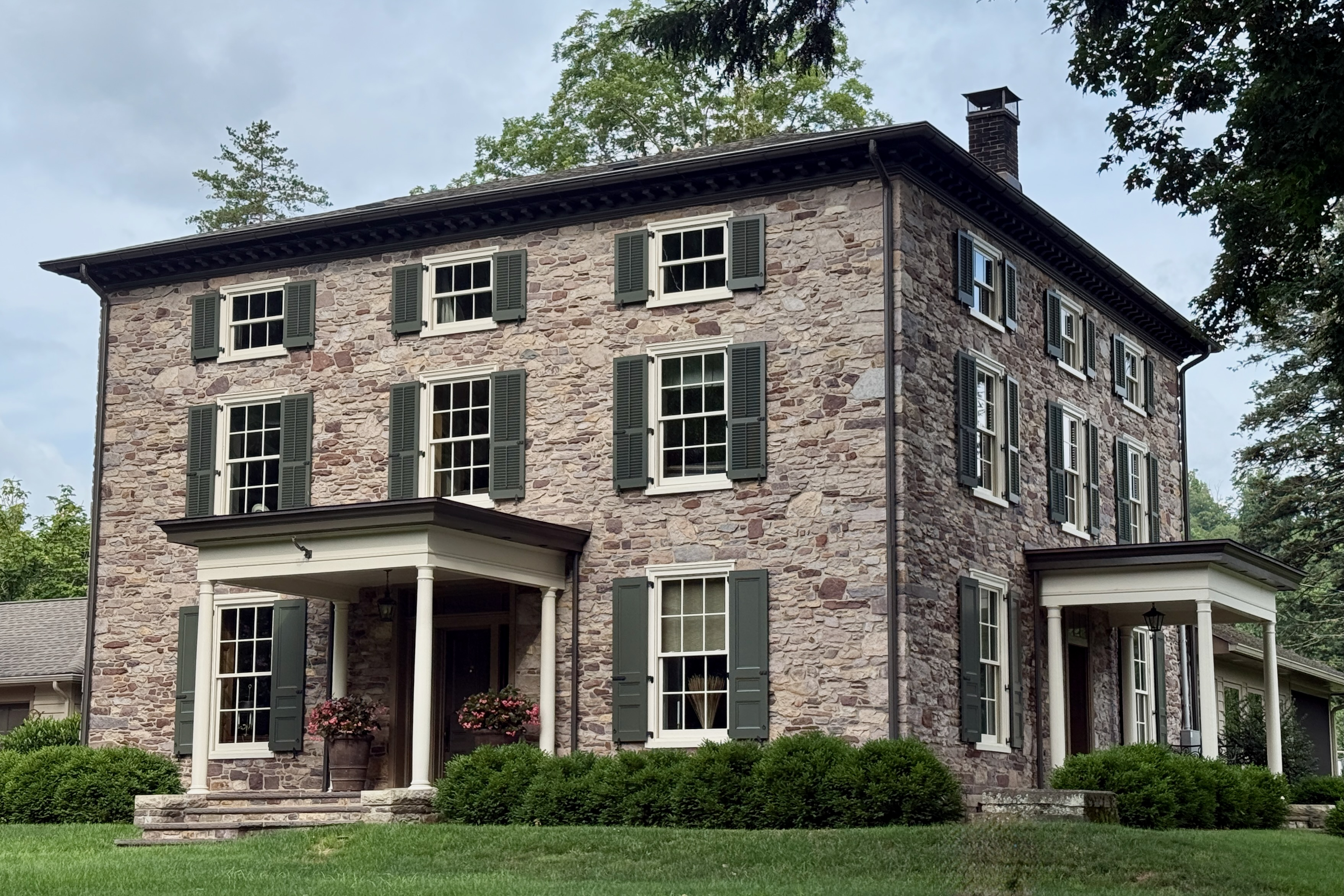
Historic stone house overlooking the river

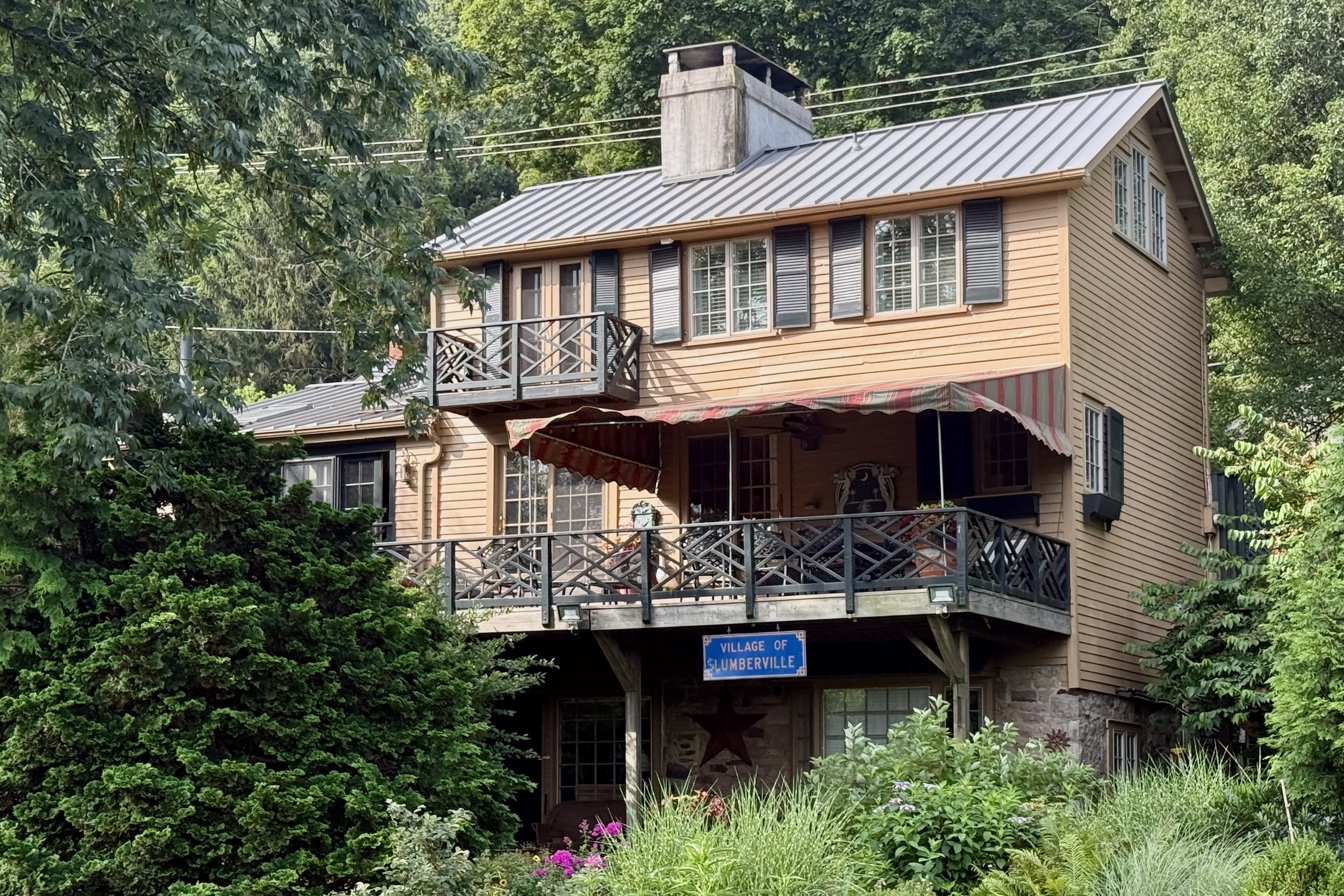
House along the Delaware Canal

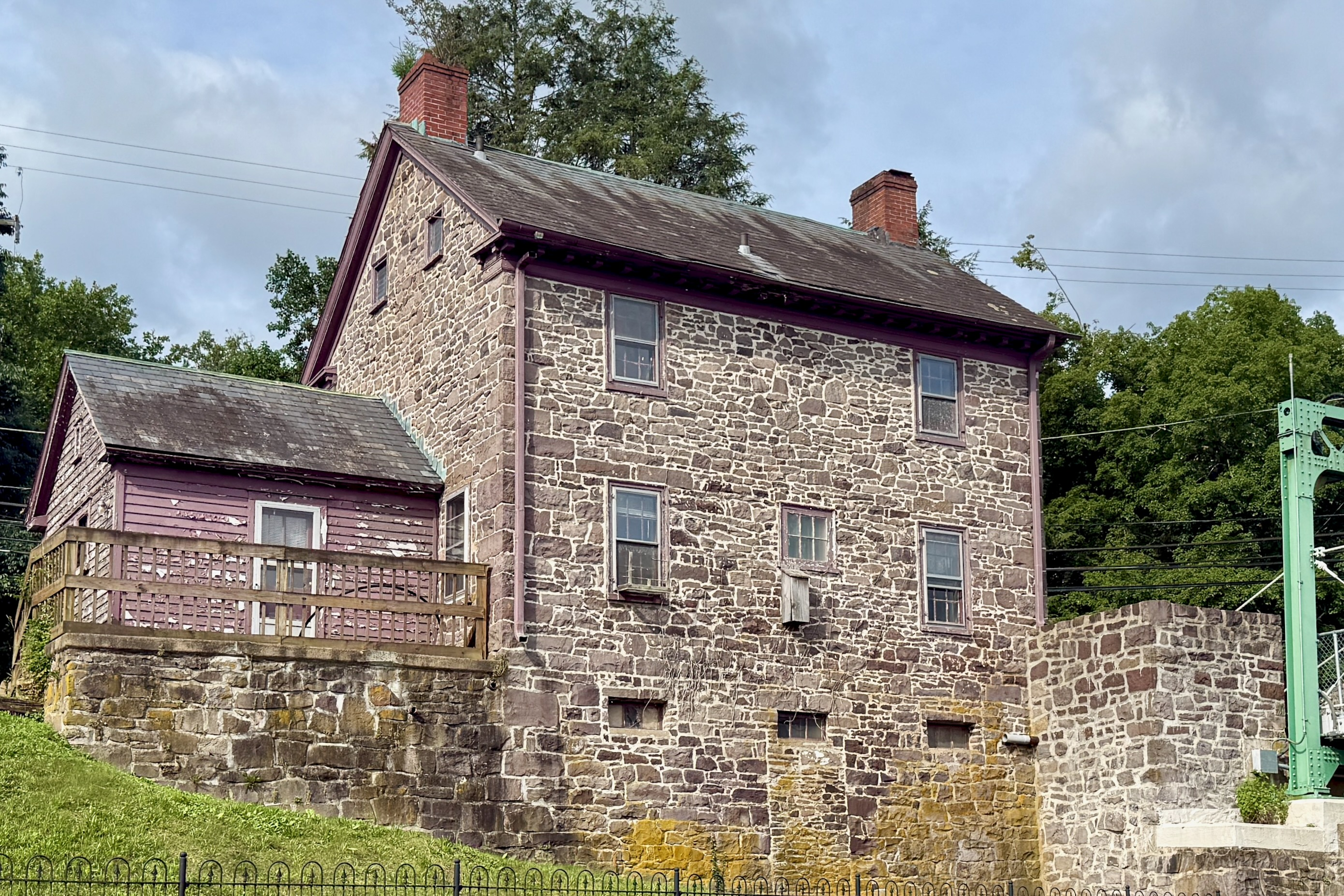
Lumberville–Raven Rock Bridge House

== See also ==
- National Register of Historic Places listings in Bucks County, Pennsylvania
