= George Wall (disambiguation) =

George Wall may refer to:

- George Wall (military officer) (1743-1804)
- George Wall (botanist) (1821-1894)
- George Wall (1885-1962), English footballer
- George Wall (speedway rider) (1922-1992)
