= James Madison Porter III =

American engineer

- Born: 1864
- Died: 1928 (aged 63–64)
- Alma mater: Lafayette College
- Occupation: Civil engineer
- Employer: Lafayette College
- Works: Northampton Street Bridge, Riegelsville Bridge

James Madison Porter III (1864–1928) was an American civil engineer notable for his role in designing two unique bridges across the Delaware River and for his development of the civil engineering program at Lafayette College. His grandfather, James Madison Porter, was one of the college's founders. Porter III served on the civil engineering faculty at Lafayette from 1890 to 1917 and was an early advocate for materials testing.

In addition to his academic achievements, Porter designed the Northampton Street Bridge between Easton, Pennsylvania, and Phillipsburg, New Jersey, which is now one of few eyebar cantilever bridges remaining in the U.S. and notable for its high level of ornamentation. Porter also served as consulting engineer to John A. Roebling and Sons on the Riegelsville Bridge further downstream, a wire-rope suspension bridge. Both bridges have national significance for their unique designs and have been documented by the Historic American Engineering Record. Drawings and calculations for these bridges are among Porter's papers collected at the Northampton County Historical and Genealogical Society, the Delaware River Joint Toll Bridge Commission archives, and in Special Collections at Lafayette College's Skillman Library.
