= Interstate 78 =

Interstate Highway in Pennsylvania, New Jersey, and New York

Interstate 78
- I-78 highlighted in red

Route information
- Maintained by PennDOT, DRJTBC, NJDOT, NJTA, and PANYNJ
- Length: 146.28 mi (235.41 km)
- Existed: 1957–present
- NHS: Entire route
- Restrictions: No hazardous goods in the Holland Tunnel

Major junctions
- West end: I-81 in Union Township, PA
- US 22 in Fredericksburg, PA; US 222 near Allentown, PA; US 22 near Alpha, NJ; I-287 in Bedminster, NJ; US 1 / US 9 in Newark, NJ; I-95 in Newark, NJ
- East end: Canal Street in New York, NY

Location
- Country: United States
- States: Pennsylvania, New Jersey, New York

Highway system
- Interstate Highway System; Main; Auxiliary; Suffixed; Business; Future

Interstate 78 (I-78) is an east–west Interstate Highway in the Northeastern United States that runs 144 miles (232 km) from I-81 northeast of Harrisburg, Pennsylvania, through Allentown to western and North Jersey, terminating at the Holland Tunnel entrance to Lower Manhattan in New York City. Major metropolitan areas along I-78 include the Lehigh Valley in Pennsylvania, the Gateway Region in New Jersey, and the New York metropolitan area.

I-78 links ports in New York City and North Jersey to points west, including the Lehigh Valley, the third-largest metropolitan region of Pennsylvania. I-78 accommodates over four million trucks annually, representing 24 percent of all truck traffic in the nation. It also is a major connection point to the New York metropolitan area's three major international airports, Newark Liberty International Airport, John F. Kennedy International Airport, and LaGuardia Airport.

== Route description ==
Lengths
	mi	km
PA	77.95	125.45
NJ	67.83	109.16
NY	0.50	0.80
Total	146.28	235.41

=== Pennsylvania ===
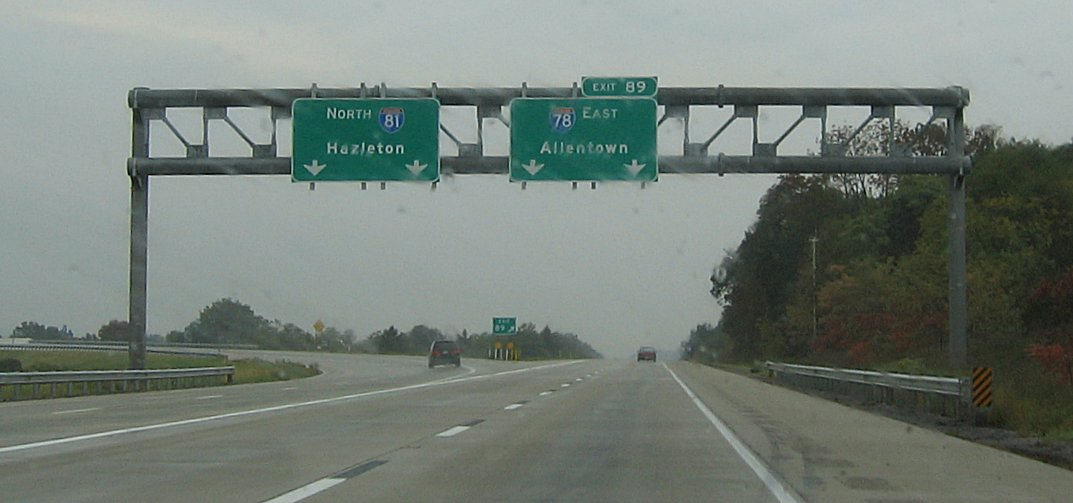
The I-78 interchange approaching I-81 north in Union Township, Pennsylvania

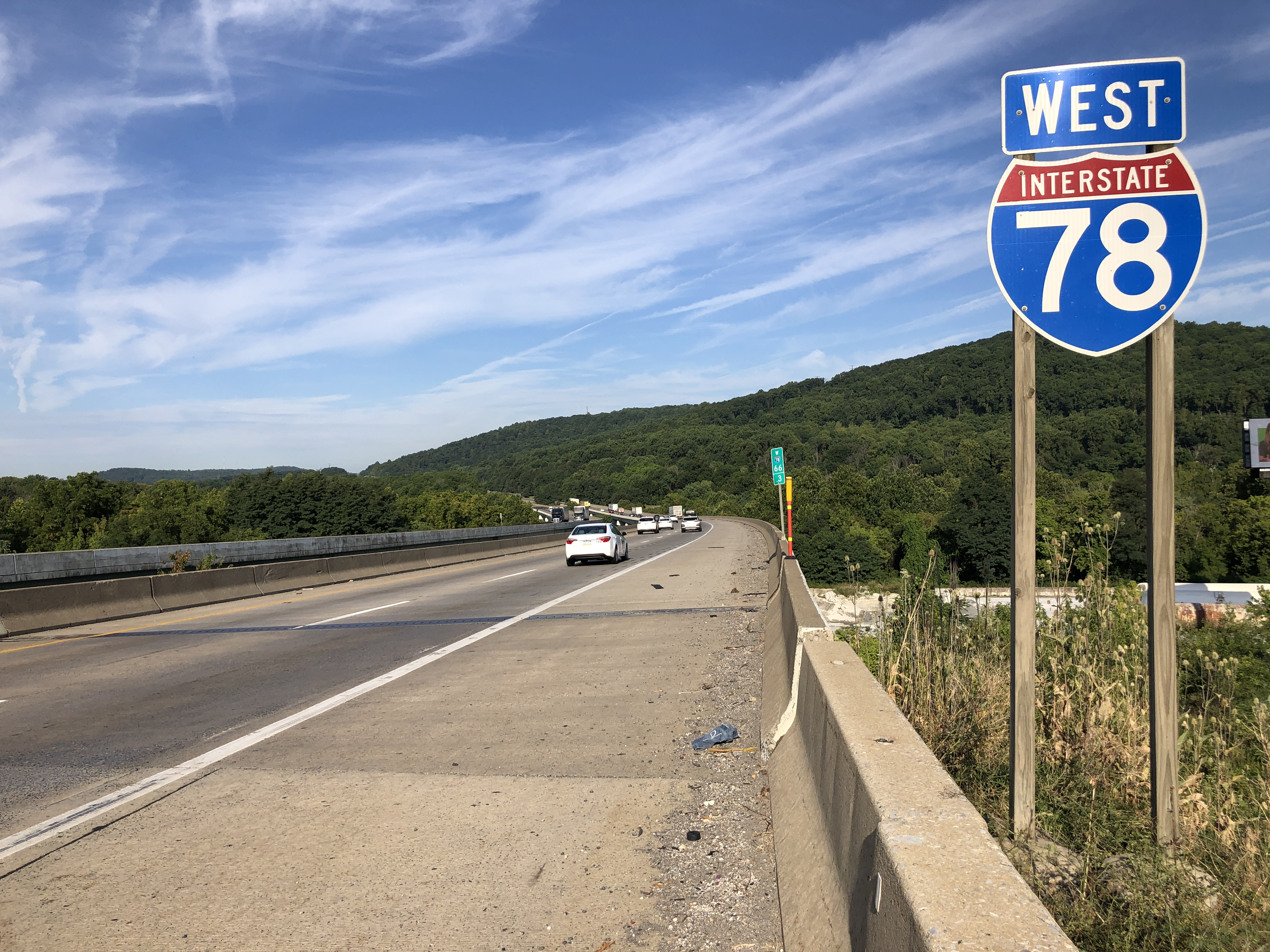
I-78 westbound past the PA 412 interchange in Bethlehem in the Lehigh Valley

I-78 begins at a directional T interchange with I-81 in Union Township, about 25 miles (40 km) northeast of Harrisburg. Near the east end of the county, at exit 8, U.S. Route 22 (US 22) merges with I-78, and runs concurrently for the next 43 miles (69 km) through Berks and Lehigh counties.

At exit 51, in Upper Macungie Township, US 22 leaves the highway. Drivers on I-78 eastbound must use this exit to access I-476, also known as the Northeast Extension of the Pennsylvania Turnpike, and westbound travelers must use exit 53 (northbound Pennsylvania Route 309, PA 309) and then westbound US 22. From exits 53 to 60, I-78 runs concurrently with PA 309. The six-lane overlap bypasses the city of Allentown to the south and crosses South Mountain.

At exit 60 (A–B going westbound), PA 309 yields south to Quakertown. Approximately six miles (9.7 km) east, there is an interchange between PA 412 and I-78 in Hellertown, serving Bethlehem and Lehigh University. At exit 71, PA 33 reaches its southern terminus at a trumpet interchange. PA 33 traverses the Pocono Mountains as it enters Bangor and crosses I-80. The final exit on I-78 in Pennsylvania is Morgan Hill Road, which accesses PA 611 and Easton. I-78 then crosses the I-78 Toll Bridge and enters New Jersey.

=== New Jersey ===
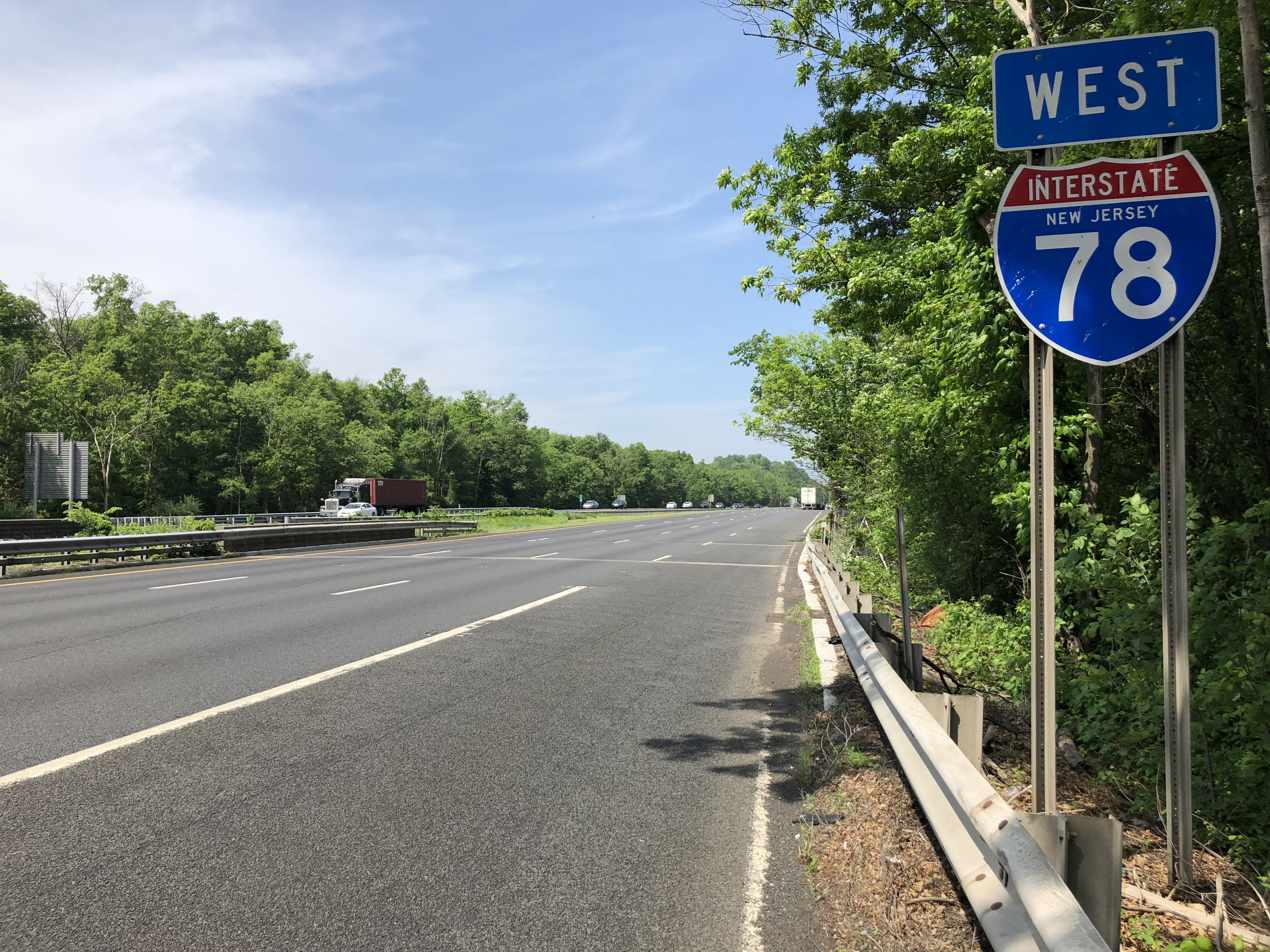
I-78 westbound in Warren Township, New Jersey

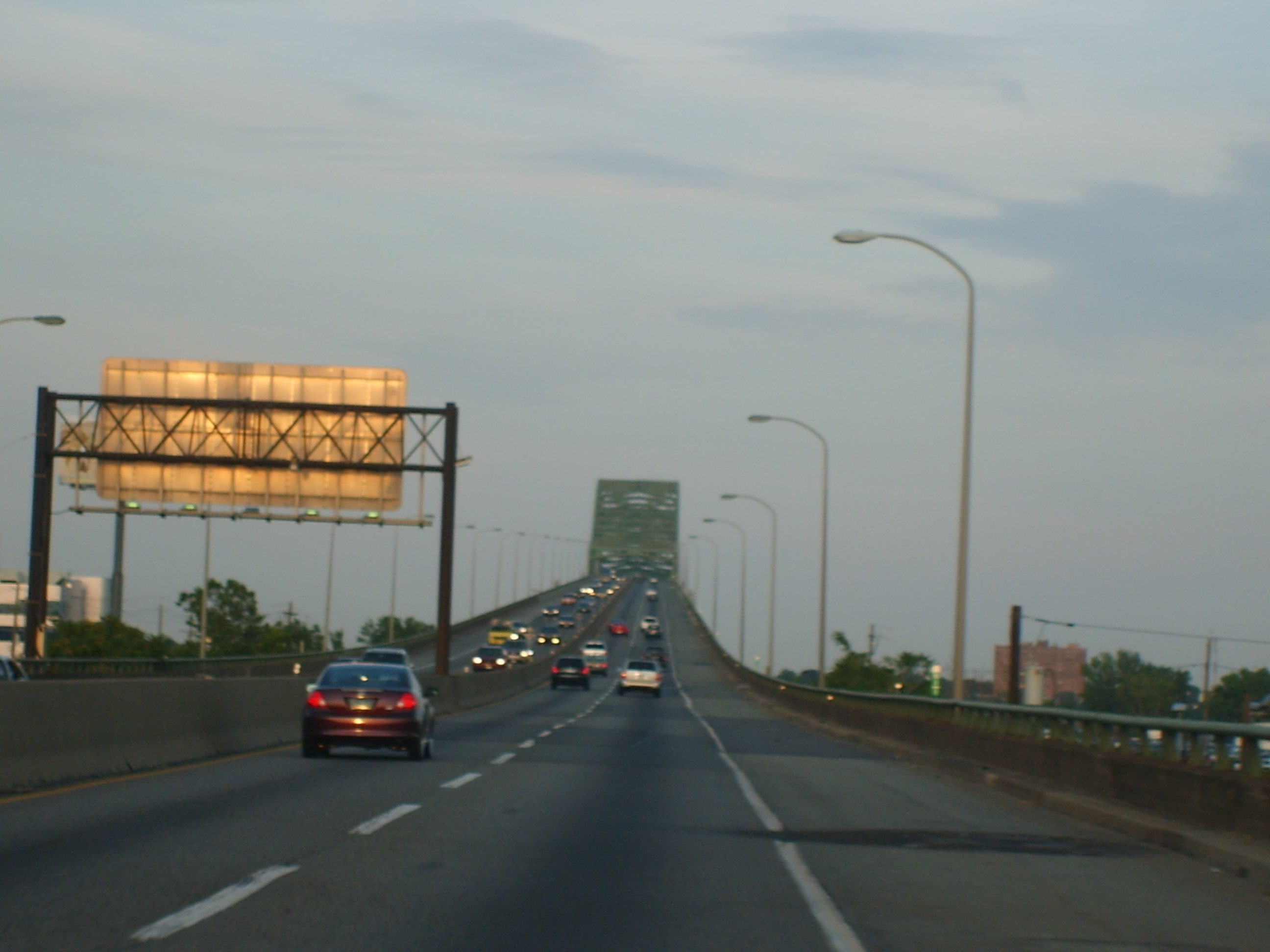
I-78 eastbound crossing Newark Bay at Newark Bay Bridge

After the I-78 Toll Bridge, I-78 enters New Jersey as the Phillipsburg–Newark Expressway. The road begins by running parallel with County Route 642 (CR 642) in the town of Alpha. At 3.94 miles (6.34 km), a partial cloverleaf interchange brings together US 22, Route 122, and Route 173 with I-78 in Phillipsburg. US 22 now runs concurrently with I-78 for the next 15 miles (24 km). Going westbound, exit 4 leaves to the right for CR 637 and Warren Glen. The next exit, exit 6, is for CR 632 in Bloomsbury. The route number is not signed on I-78. Exit 7 in Bloomsbury is the first of several eastbound exits for Route 173, which runs parallel the Interstate. Four miles (6.4 km) later, exit 11 leaves to the right as another exit for Route 173. CR 614 is located off the exit. Exit 12 westbound is for Route 173 again. Exit 12 eastbound is for a frontage road paralleling I-78.

Exit 13 is only westbound and is another exit for Route 173. Nearby the exit, going eastbound, the frontage road merges in. Exit 15 is for Route 173 and CR 513 in Franklin Township. Exit 17 is for Route 31 in Clinton Township. In Annandale, US 22 leaves I-78 at exit 18. US 22 continues to Bound Brook and Union County. At exit 20, CR 639 intersects. CR 639 heads to the Round Valley Reservoir. Exit 24 is for CR 523 to Oldwick. At exit 29, I-287, US 202, and US 206 interchange with I-78 in Bedminster. At this point, in Somerset County, exits 33, 36, and 40 are for county routes in Warren Township. At exit 41, I-78 enters Union County and then passes through the Watchung Reservation, where land bridges cross over the highway to allow for the safe passage of wildlife. At exit 45, CR 527 intersects after paralleling for some time. West of exit 48, I-78 splits into express and local highways. Exit 48 is for Route 24 in Springfield Township. Exit 49A is for one of Route 24's spur routes, Route 124. Exit 52 is for the Garden State Parkway in Union Township. At exits 57 and 58, Route 21, US 1, US 9, and US 22 intersect I-78. The exit provides access to Newark Liberty International Airport.

East of exit 58 at the eastern tip of Newark, I-78 becomes the Newark Bay Extension of the New Jersey Turnpike. Past the first toll plaza, I-78 has an interchange with I-95 (New Jersey Turnpike) and crosses Newark Bay via the Newark Bay Bridge. The first exit, 14A, is for Route 440 in Bayonne. Liberty State Park can be reached by taking exit 14B. Exit 14C is the final numbered exit, providing access to the Liberty Science Center. Route 139 runs concurrently with I-78 along a one-way pair of surface streets as it approaches the Holland Tunnel and enters New York state.

=== New York ===
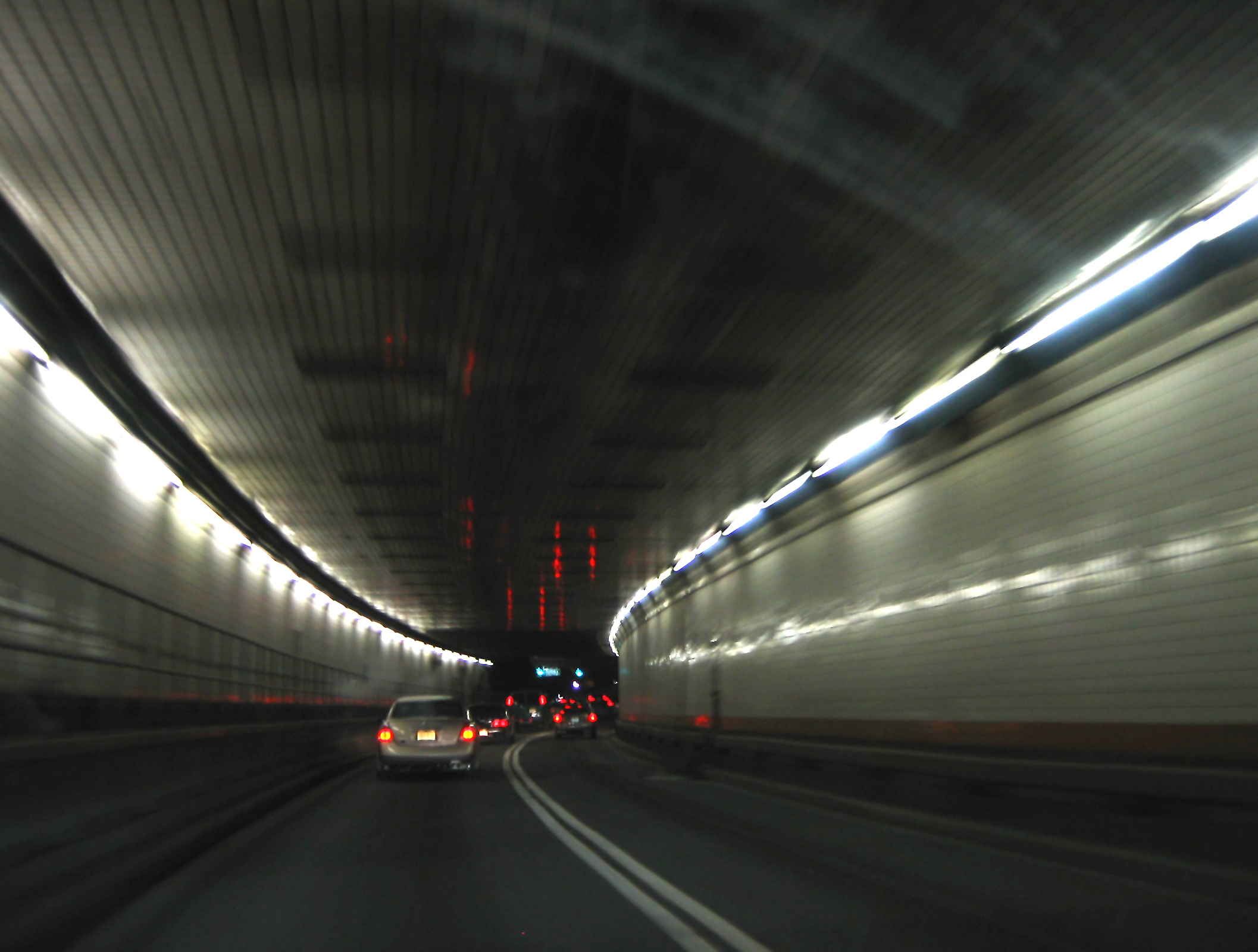
I-78 leaving Jersey City and entering the Holland Tunnel to SoHo and New York City

I-78's length in New York is 0.5 miles (0.80 km)—half of the Holland Tunnel and the egress-only roundabout immediately beyond the end of the tunnel. The route was planned to run east and north through New York City to end at I-95 in the Bronx, but sections of the planned route, including the Lower Manhattan Expressway, were canceled.

In New York City, I-78 continues through the egress-only roundabout known as the Saint John's Rotary. The five separate exits from the Rotary are assigned numbers, exits 1 to 5, in counterclockwise order. Exit 5, the last eastbound exit, leads onto Canal Street. Under original plans, I-78 was to cross Manhattan as the Lower Manhattan Expressway onto the Williamsburg Bridge and then beyond I-278 on Bushwick Expressway through Brooklyn into Queens near the John F. Kennedy International Airport. A section of I-78 at the airport was built as the Nassau Expressway, later I-878 and now New York State Route 878 (NY 878), though most of the westbound side was never built. Under the plans, east of the airport, I-78 would have turned north on the Clearview Expressway, built north of Hillside Avenue in Queens and now I-295, run across the Throgs Neck Bridge, and forked into two spurs, ending at I-95 via the Throgs Neck Expressway, which is now I-695 and the Bruckner Interchange via the Cross Bronx Expressway, which is now part of I-295.

== Junction list ==
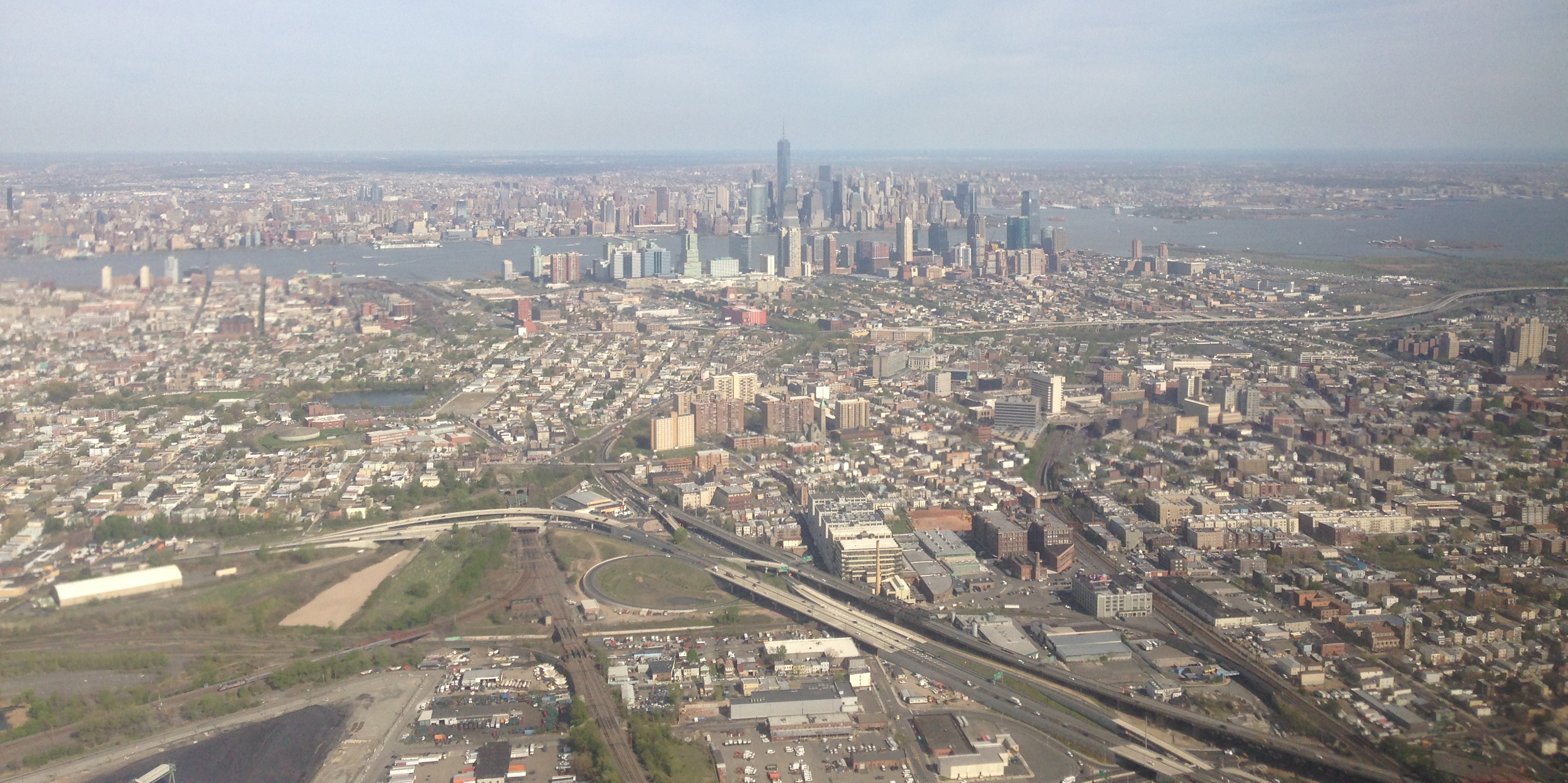
Aerial photo of I-78 in New Jersey and New York City

Pennsylvania
I-81 west-northwest of Jonestown
US 22 east-northeast of Fredericksburg. The highways travel concurrently to east-northeast of Fogelsville.
US 222 west of Allentown
PA 33 southwest of Easton
New Jersey
US 22 east-northeast of Alpha. The highways travel concurrently to Annandale.
I-287 in Bedminster
US 1 / US 9 / US 22 in Newark
I-95 in Newark
New York
Canal Street in Lower Manhattan

== Auxiliary routes ==
All of I-78's auxiliary routes serve New York City; however, none of these routes actually intersect I-78, following the route's truncation at the eastern end of the Holland Tunnel.

- I-278 runs from US 1/9 in Linden, New Jersey, over the Goethals Bridge, through Staten Island, over the Verrazzano–Narrows Bridge and through Brooklyn and Queens, and across the Triborough Bridge into the Bronx to end at I-95 at the Bruckner Interchange. I-278 was planned to extend west from Elizabeth, New Jersey, to I-78 in Springfield Township, Union County, New Jersey, and was to intersect I-78 at the east end of the Williamsburg Bridge in Brooklyn. Until 1972, I-278 ran along present-NY 895 and a proposed extension to I-95, while I-278 east of NY 895 was I-878.
- I-478 is an unsigned designation for the Brooklyn–Battery Tunnel, a spur from I-278 into Lower Manhattan. Plans were made to continue it north along the West Side Highway (NY 9A) to I-78 at the Holland Tunnel, though the project was later canceled.
- I-678 runs from I-278 at the Bruckner Interchange south over the Bronx–Whitestone Bridge to John F. Kennedy International Airport. It was to intersect I-78 at its south end. Original plans took I-678 west on the Grand Central Parkway to I-278.
- I-878 is an unsigned designation for part of NY 878, a short west–east freeway on the north edge of John F. Kennedy International Airport. It was once planned as part of I-78 and now intersects I-678. The number was assigned in 1970.
- A former I-878 existed from 1959 to 1972 along present I-278 east of NY 895. (NY 895 was part of I-278.)

In the Lehigh Valley region of eastern Pennsylvania, PA 378, which exits in downtown Bethlehem, was once I-378 but was predesignated as a state route after I-78 was rerouted to a new southerly alignment. I-178 was initially planned to extend in Center City Allentown, but local opposition to the plan led to it being cancelled.
