= Interstate 78 Toll Bridge =

Bridge in Pennsylvania and New Jersey

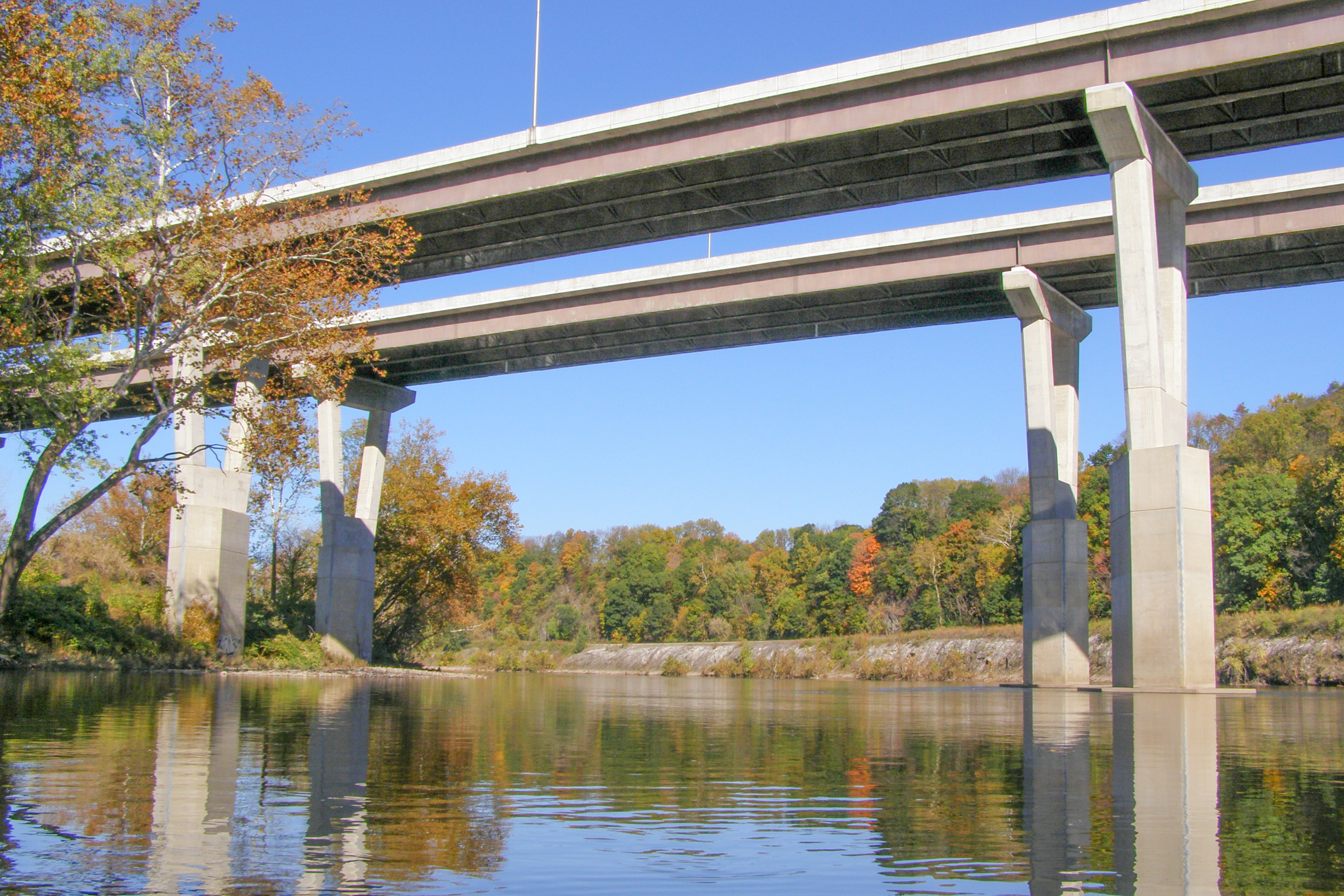
- Crossing the Delaware River
- Coordinates: 40.6721°N 75.1778°W
- Carries: 6 lanes of I-78
- Crosses: Delaware River, Delaware Canal
- Locale: Williams Township, Pennsylvania and Phillipsburg, New Jersey
- Official name: Interstate 78 Toll Bridge
- Owner: Delaware River Joint Toll Bridge Commission
- Maintained by: Delaware River Joint Toll Bridge Commission
- Preceded by: Lehigh Valley Railroad Bridge
- Followed by: Riegelsville Bridge

Characteristics
- Design: Twin girder bridge
- Material: Concrete
- Total length: 372 meters (1,220 feet)
- No. of spans: 7

History
- Opened: November 21, 1989

Statistics
- Daily traffic: 56,100
- Toll: Westbound: $5.00 for cars without E-ZPass $2.00 for cars with E-ZPass

Location
- Interactive map of Interstate 78 Toll Bridge

The Interstate 78 Toll Bridge (I-78 Toll Bridge) carries Interstate 78 across the Delaware River between Williams Township, Pennsylvania, and Phillipsburg, New Jersey, in the Lehigh Valley region of eastern Pennsylvania and western New Jersey in the United States. The bridge opened on November 21, 1989, and is operated by the Delaware River Joint Toll Bridge Commission (DRJTBC). As of 2008, the bridge carried an average of 56,100 vehicles daily.

The span has an overall length of 1,222 feet (372 m) and is a twin four girder span. A toll is charged only for traffic heading west into Pennsylvania. The toll plaza has four conventional lanes and two Express E-ZPass lanes. Just after the toll plaza is the Pennsylvania Welcome Center.

The jurisdiction of the DRJTBC for the bridge extends between the first interchange on either side of the bridge, which includes 2.2 miles (3.5 km) west along I-78 to just west of exit 75 in Pennsylvania and 4.2 miles (6.8 km) east in New Jersey to exit 3.

== Tolls ==
Tolls on the Interstate 78 Toll Bridge are incurred only by motorists leaving New Jersey and entering Pennsylvania. There is no toll for those leaving Pennsylvania and entering New Jersey. On January 7, 2024, tolls on the I-78 Toll Bridge increased to $1.50 for motorists entering Pennsylvania with E-ZPass and $3.00 for motorists entering Pennsylvania without E-ZPass.

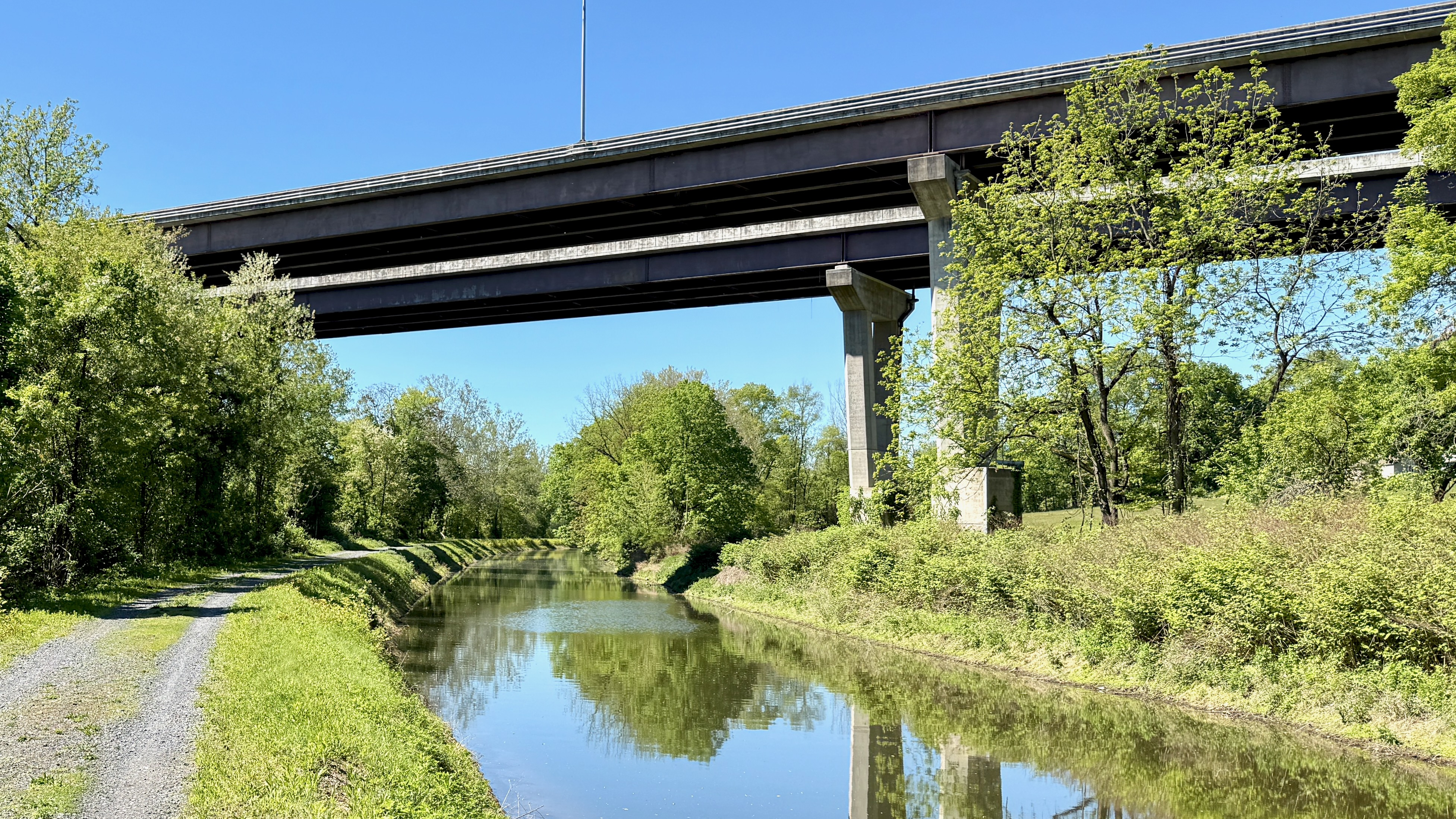
Crossing the Delaware Canal

== See also ==
- List of crossings of the Delaware River
