= Northampton Street Bridge =

Bridge in Phillipsburg, New Jersey

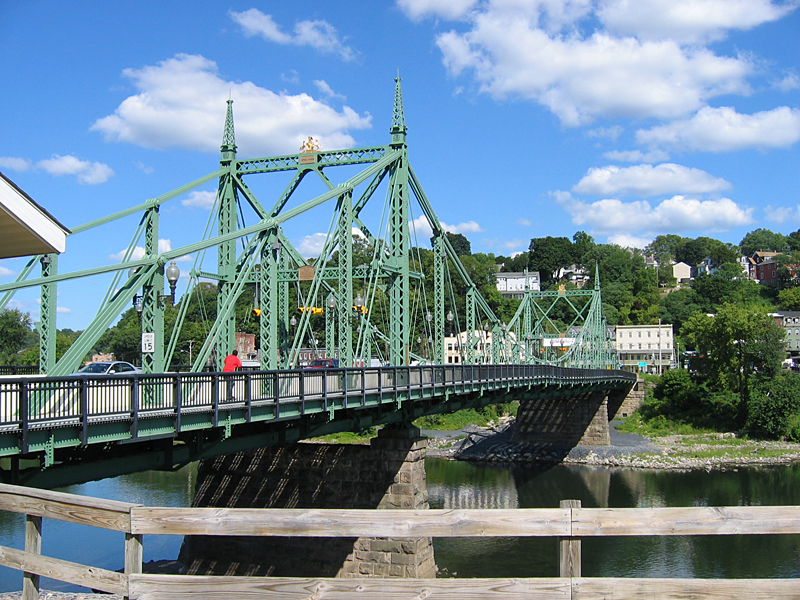
- Northampton Street Bridge between Easton, Pennsylvania and Phillipsburg, New Jersey
- Coordinates: 40.691545°N 75.204004°W
- Carries: 3 lanes of Northampton Street and 2 sidewalks
- Crosses: Delaware River
- Locale: Easton, Pennsylvania, and Phillipsburg, New Jersey
- Official name: Northampton Street Toll Supported Bridge
- Other name(s): The Free Bridge; Easton-Phillipsburg Bridge
- Maintained by: Delaware River Joint Toll Bridge Commission

Characteristics
- Total length: 560 feet (170 m)
- Load limit: 3 short tons (2.7 t)

History
- Designer: James Madison Porter III
- Opened: 1896
- Replaces: Ferry (1739–1806); Covered bridge (1806–1896)

Location
- Interactive map of Northampton Street Bridge

The Northampton Street Bridge is a bridge that crosses the Delaware River, connecting Easton, Pennsylvania, and Phillipsburg, New Jersey, United States. It is maintained by the Delaware River Joint Toll Bridge Commission despite not being a toll bridge. It is known locally as the "Free Bridge" thus distinguishing it from the Easton–Phillipsburg Toll Bridge just upstream to the north.

== History ==
The crossing was first a ferry crossing run by David Martin, beginning in 1739.

The original wooden bridge opened on October 14, 1806. The original bridge was designed and built by Timothy Palmer, one of the most famous bridge builders of his time. Palmer's covered bridge at Easton endured many floods and storms while other bridges fell. However, by the late nineteenth century, when horse-drawn streetcars were replaced by trolley cars, the old wooden bridge could no longer handle the demands of traffic and a new structure was erected in 1895. The new bridge was designed by James Madison Porter III, an alumnus of nearby Lafayette College and later a professor of civil engineering there. Porter hailed from a family long prominent in Easton and Pennsylvania history.

Tolls were charged until 1921, when the DRJTBC bought it from the Delaware Bridge Company.

The bridge is currently posted for a 3-short-ton (2.7 t) weight limit and a 15-mile-per-hour (24 km/h) speed limit. Noted as "combining aesthetics with economical design", the bridge was designated a National Historic Civil Engineering Landmark by the American Society of Civil Engineers and commemorated in 1995.

=== 1955 damage ===
Flooding from Hurricanes Connie and Diane in August 1955 ravaged the Delaware River valley. During the flooding, four bridges sustained serious damage or were washed away. The Portland–Columbia Covered Bridge, the Point Pleasant–Byram Bridge, and the Yardley–Wilburtha Bridge had all or most of their spans washed away. At 5 am on August 20, 1955, remains of the covered bridge further north washed their way downstream and jammed at the Northampton Street Bridge. The jam, combined with the rushing water, cut through the structure, causing a 50-foot (15 m) gap in the center span. The remaining parts of the bridge were littered in debris from the rushing waters. The span washing away also destroyed telephone cables, which had to be restored by 300 men stringing temporary wire together.

Tolls on the Easton–Phillipsburg Toll Bridge were ten cents at the time, but they were lowered to five cents on September 1, 1955 until the Northampton Street Bridge was repaired. The United States Army Corps of Engineers installed two parallel Bailey bridges between the damaged free bridge and the toll bridge. Those bridges opened on March 15, 1956, built with a speed limit of 10 miles per hour (16 km/h) and a weight limit of 14,000 pounds (6,400,000 g).

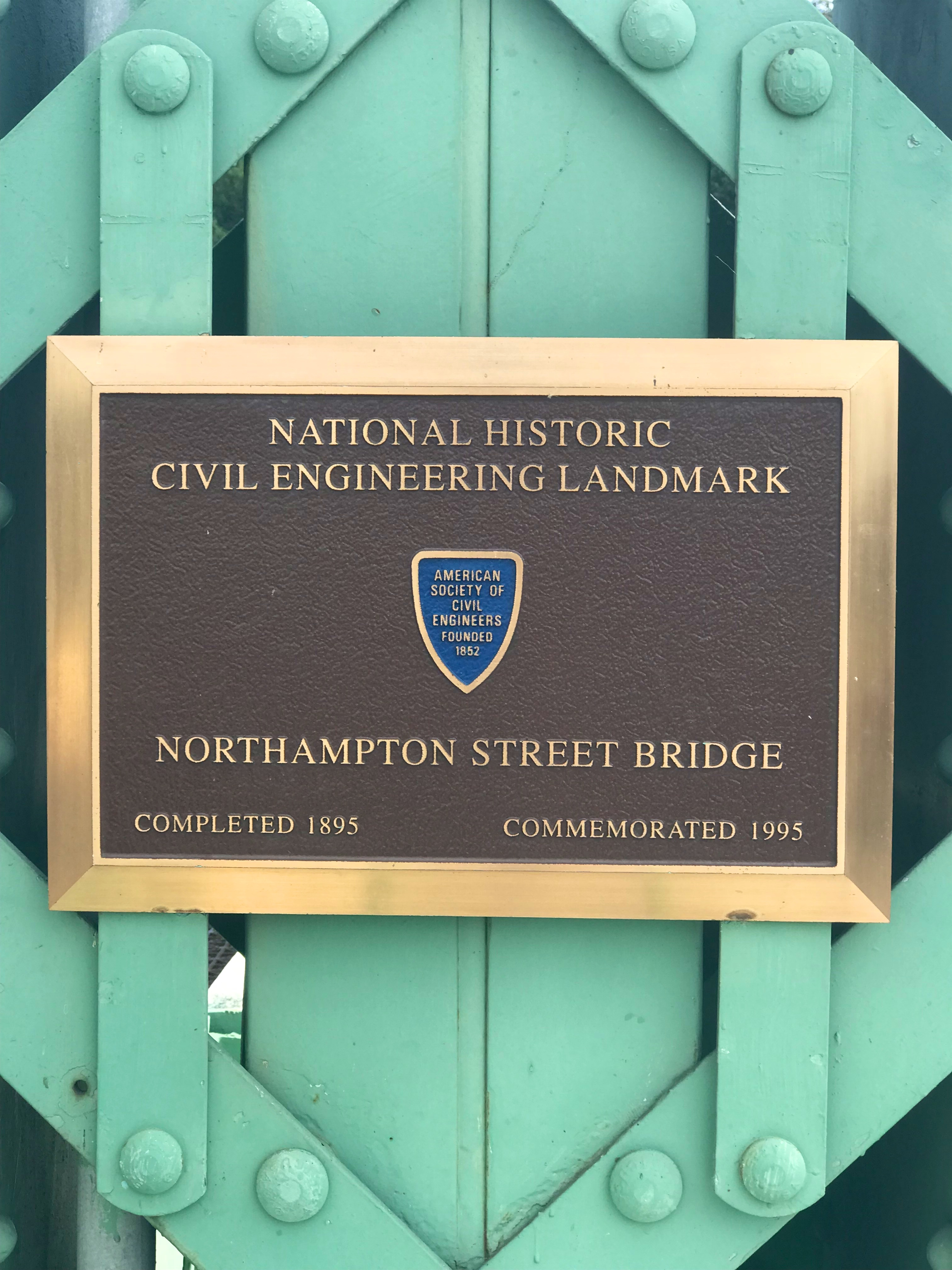
National Historic Civil Engineering Landmark plaque, commemorated in 1995

View of both bridges crossing the Delaware River

== See also ==
- List of Historic Civil Engineering Landmarks
- List of bridges documented by the Historic American Engineering Record in New Jersey
- List of bridges documented by the Historic American Engineering Record in Pennsylvania
- List of crossings of the Delaware River
