= Raven Rock Historic District =

Historic district in New Jersey, United States

- U.S. National Register of Historic Places
- U.S. Historic district
- New Jersey Register of Historic Places
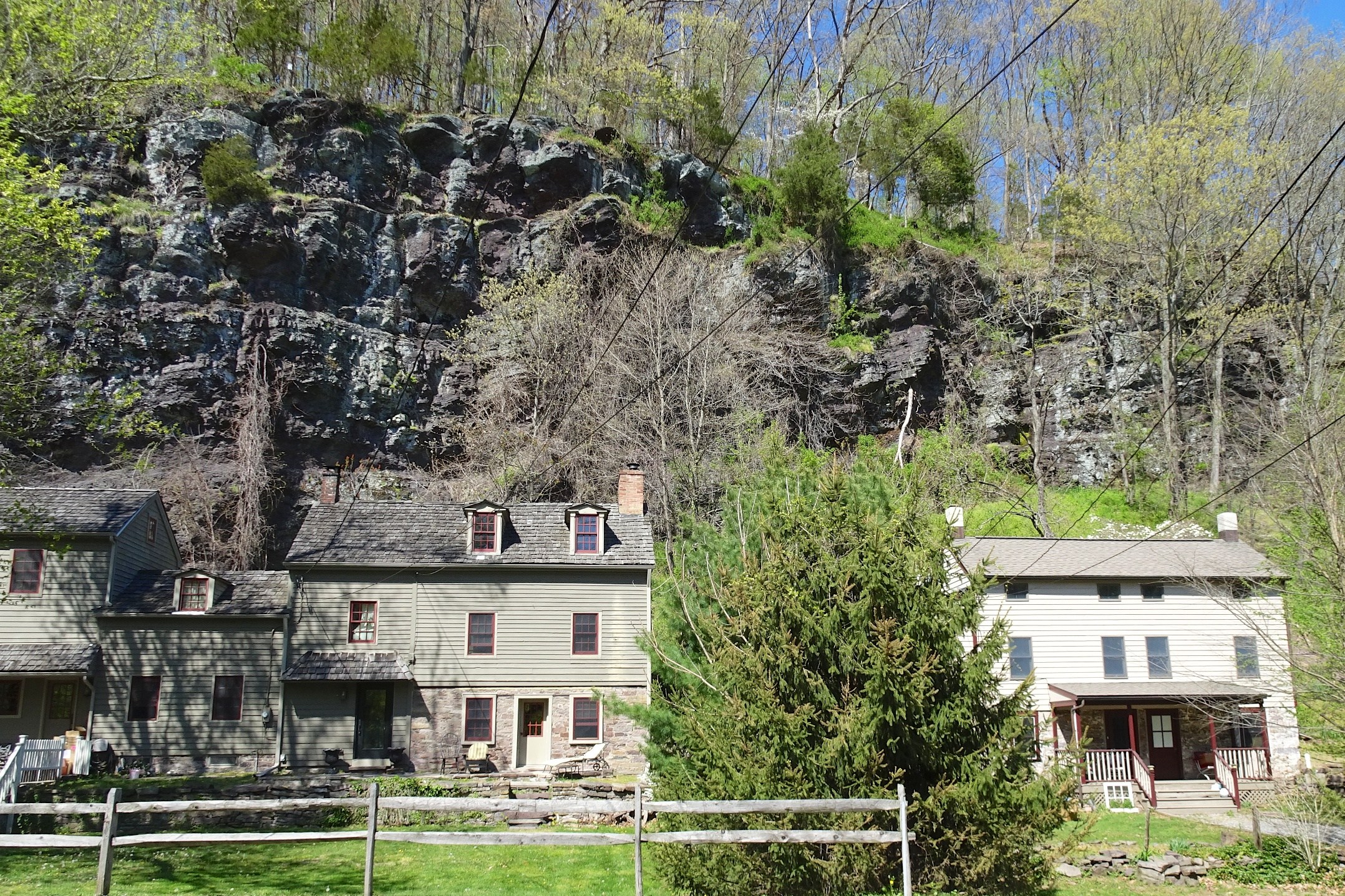
- Contributing houses along Daniel Bray Highway in front of Raven Rock cliffs

- Location within Hunterdon County, New Jersey Location within New Jersey Location within the United States
- Location: NJ 29 and Quarry Road; Delaware Township, New Jersey
- Coordinates: 40°24′40″N 75°02′02″W
- Area: 53 acres (21 ha)
- Architectural style: Greek Revival, Gothic Revival
- NRHP reference No.: 15000774
- NJRHP No.: 5462

Significant dates
- Added to NRHP: November 10, 2015
- Designated NJRHP: September 22, 2015

The Raven Rock Historic District is a 53-acre (21 ha) historic district located along Daniel Bray Highway (NJ 29) and Quarry Road in the hamlet of Raven Rock in Delaware Township in Hunterdon County, New Jersey, United States. It was added to the National Register of Historic Places on November 10, 2015, for its significance in architecture and community development. The district includes 15 contributing buildings, 2 contributing sites and 13 contributing structures.

== History and description ==
The two-story stone Saxtonville Tavern was built around 1782 and features Federal and Greek Revival influences. It was bought by Nathanial Saxton in 1810. During construction of the Delaware and Raritan Canal in the 1830s, it was a tavern with innkeeper Richard Bennett. It was documented by the Historic American Buildings Survey (HABS) in 1939. The Raven Rock Quarry was opened by the Nolan Brothers in 1873–1874. In the 1890s, John Ledger operated the quarry, then known as the Stockton Stone Company, and produced a light gray, fine grain sandstone used in construction projects. Operations stopped in the 1930s.

== Gallery of contributing properties ==
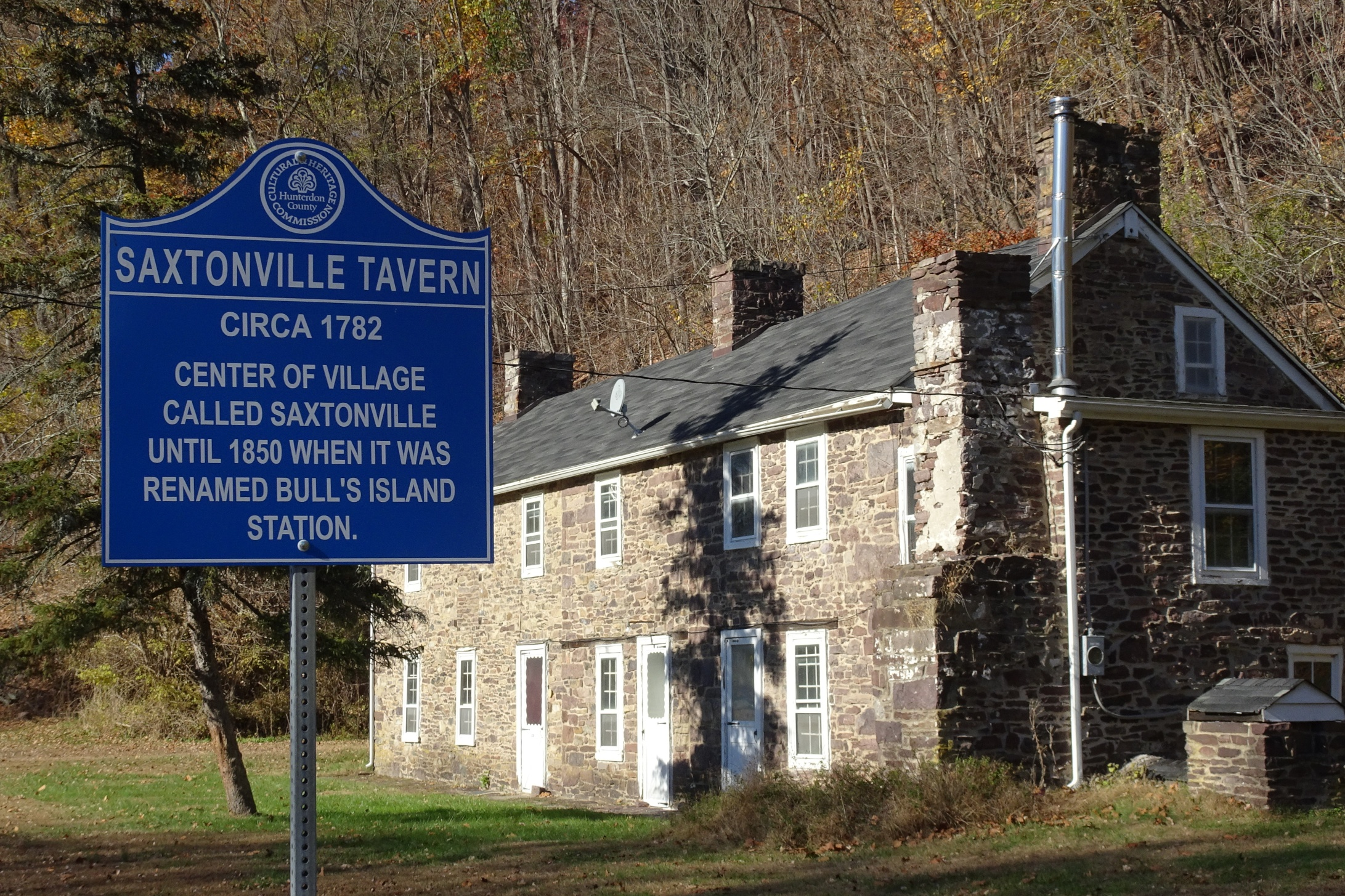
Saxtonville Tavern

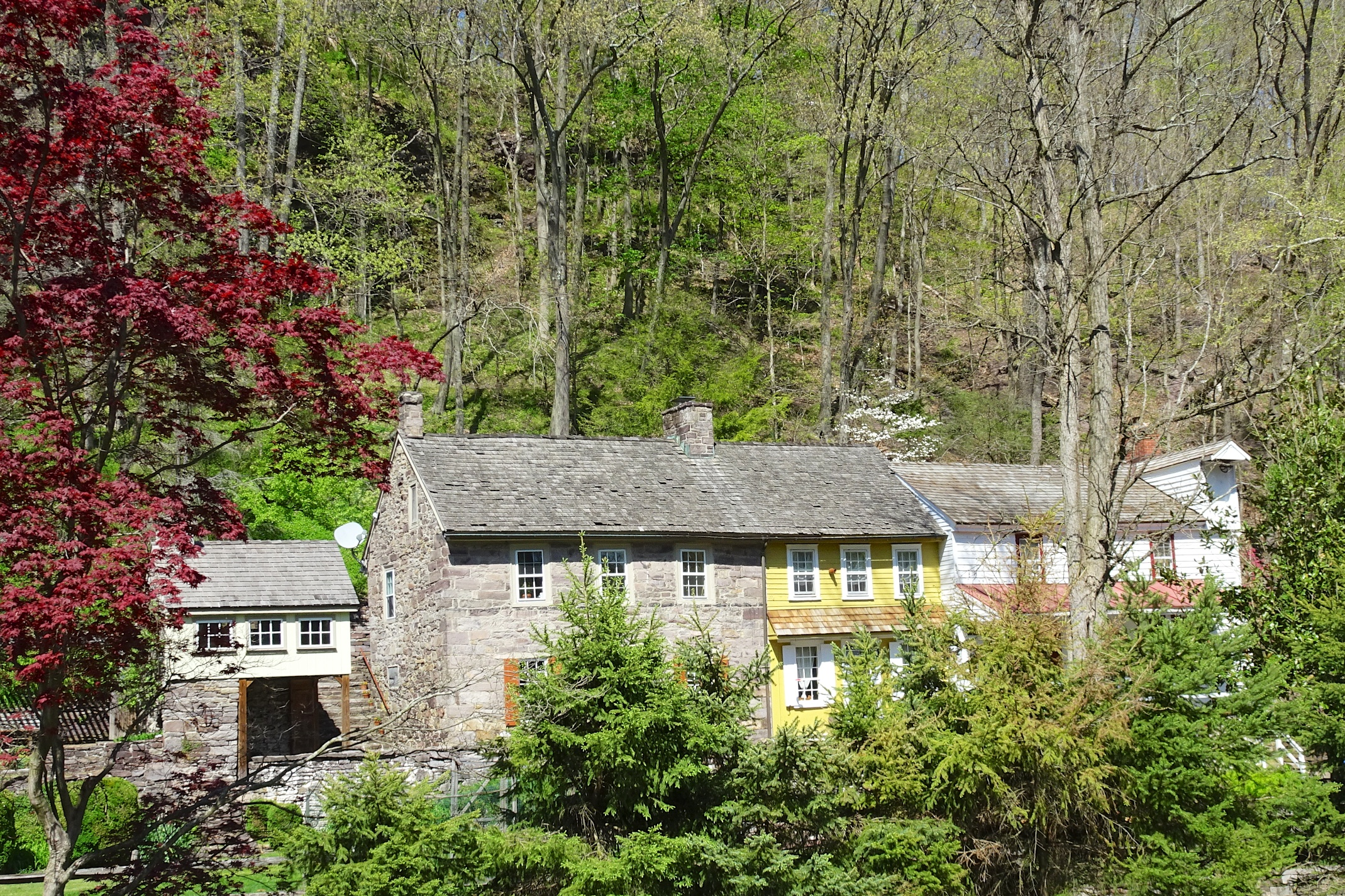
Three unit property in Colonial Revival embellishment style

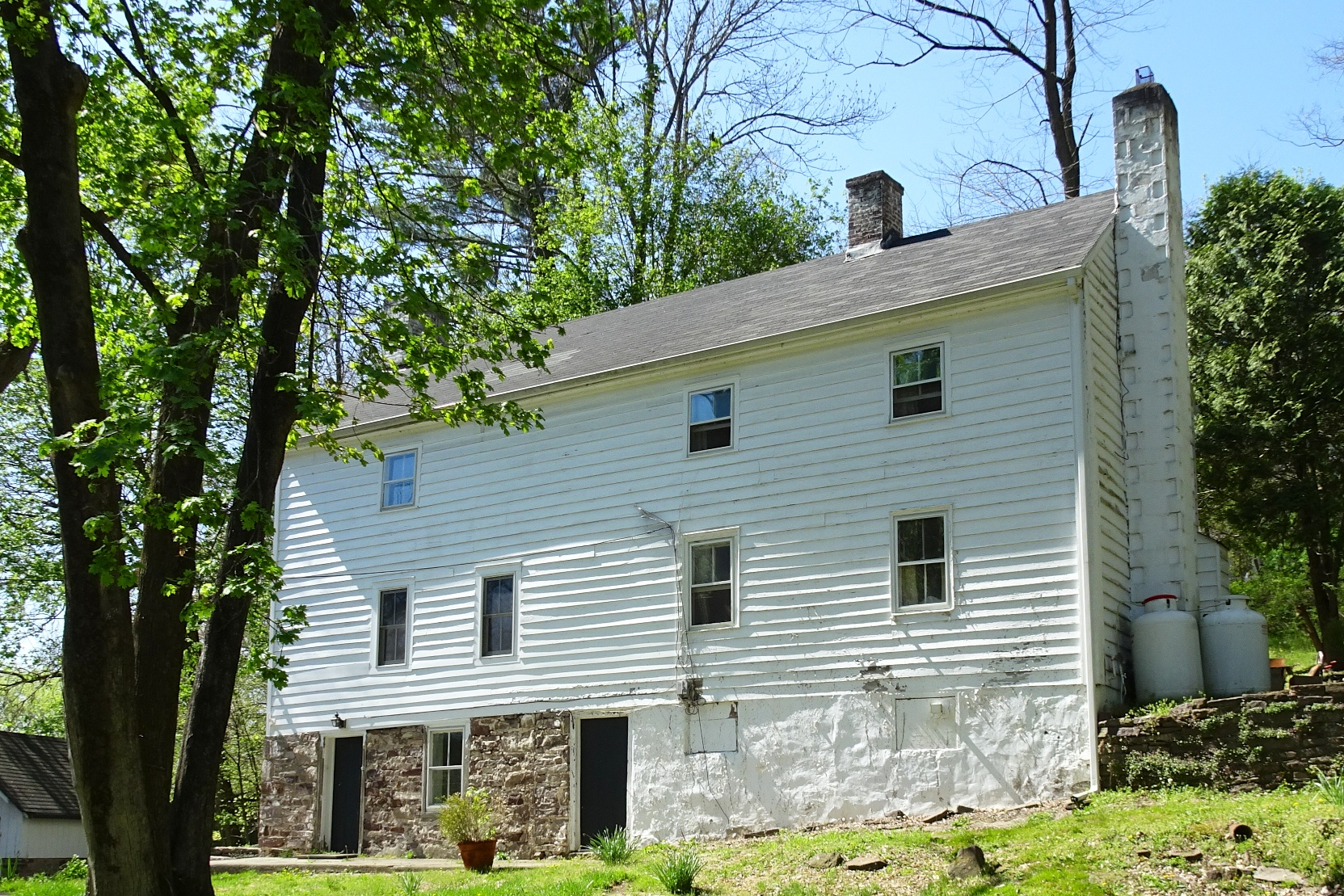
House on Quarry Road with stone bank cellar

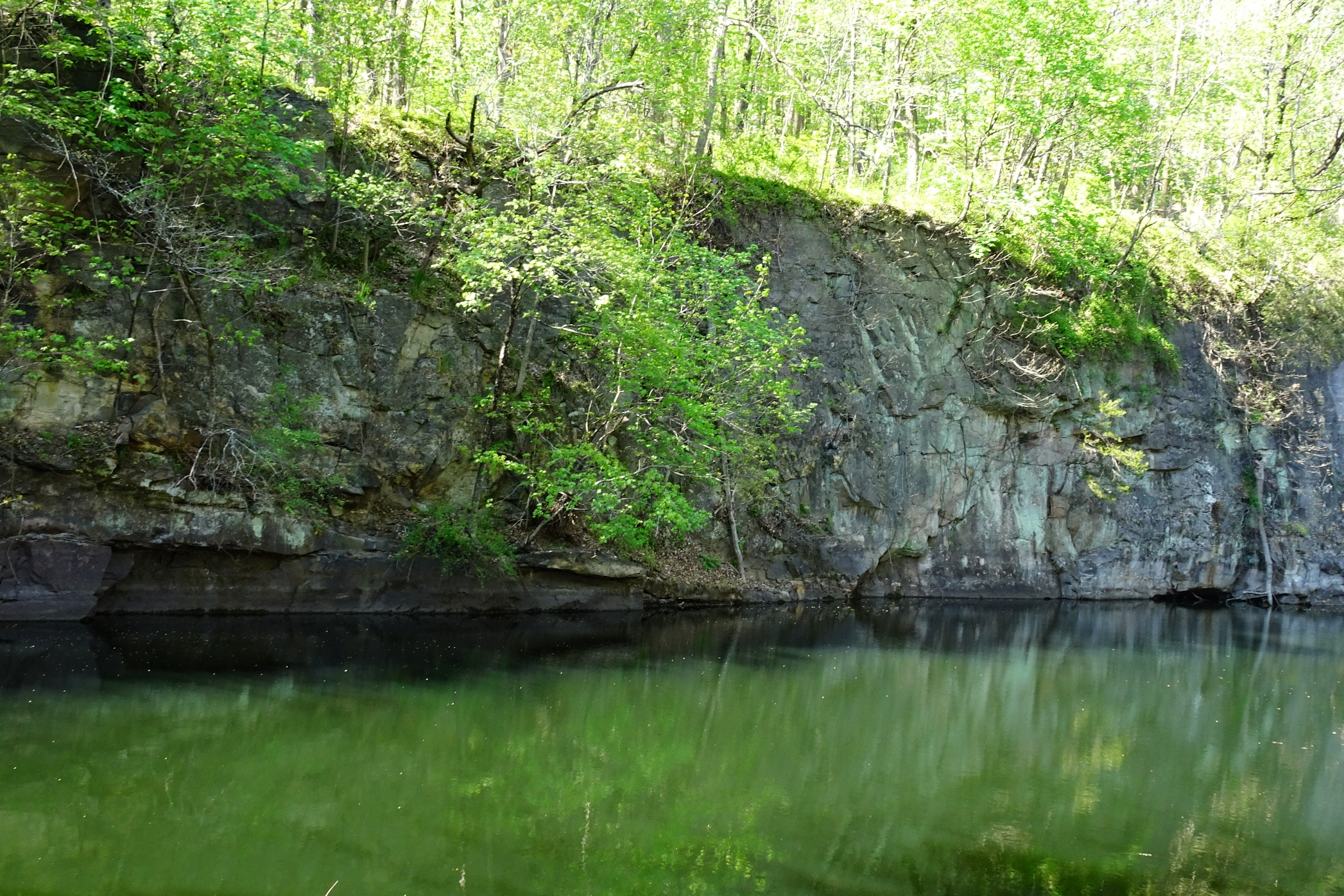
Abandoned Raven Rock Quarry

== See also ==
- National Register of Historic Places listings in Hunterdon County, New Jersey
