= Raven Rock, New Jersey =

Populated place in Hunterdon County, New Jersey, US

- Unincorporated community
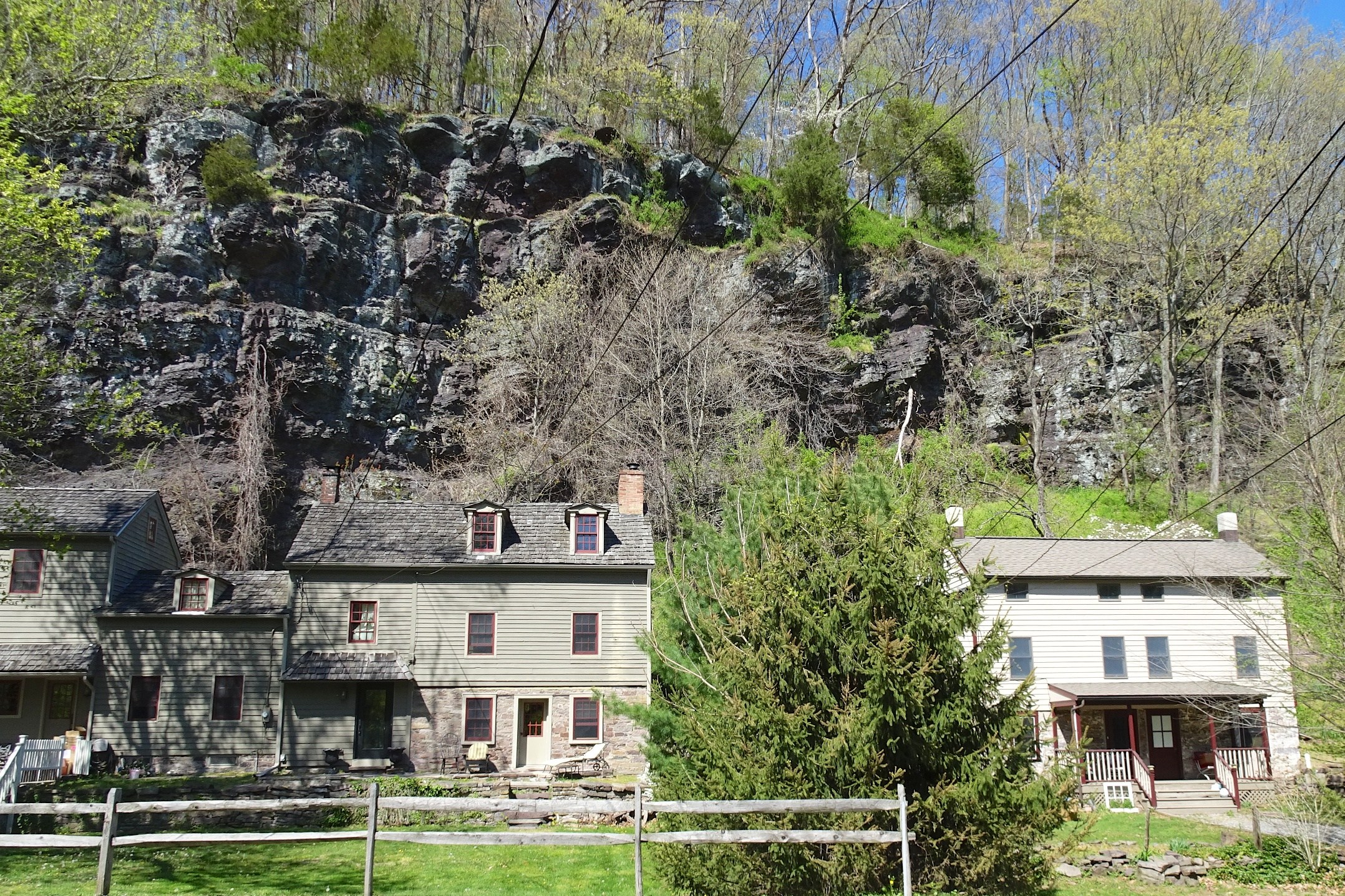
- Historic houses in front of Raven Rock cliffs

- Location within Hunterdon County, New Jersey Location within New Jersey Location within the United States
- Coordinates: 40°24′39″N 75°02′00″W
- Country: United States
- State: New Jersey
- County: Hunterdon
- Township: Delaware
- Elevation: 92 ft (28 m)
- GNIS feature ID: 879623

Raven Rock is an unincorporated community and hamlet along the Delaware River approximately three miles (4.8 km) north of Stockton along New Jersey Route 29. The hamlet was known earlier as Saxtonville. It is located within Delaware Township in Hunterdon County, in the U.S. state of New Jersey. It is the site of Bulls Island Recreation Area. The rock outcrop for which it is named is the southwest corner of the Hunterdon Plateau.

The Lumberville–Raven Rock Bridge is a free pedestrian bridge over the Delaware River, owned and operated by the Delaware River Joint Toll Bridge Commission. The bridge, formerly a road bridge from 1856 to 1944, connects Bulls Island Recreation Area to Lumberville, Pennsylvania.

From 1852 to 1952 the Pennsylvania Railroad operated a passenger stop in Raven Rock via their Belvidere Division. This segment of the railroad continued to be used for freight until 1978 when the line closed and the right of way was repurposed for a recreational rail trail in the early 1980s. Bulls Island is the trail head of the D&R Canal Trail.

The Raven Rock Historic District was added to the National Register of Historic Places on November 10, 2015 for its significance in community development and architecture.

== Gallery ==
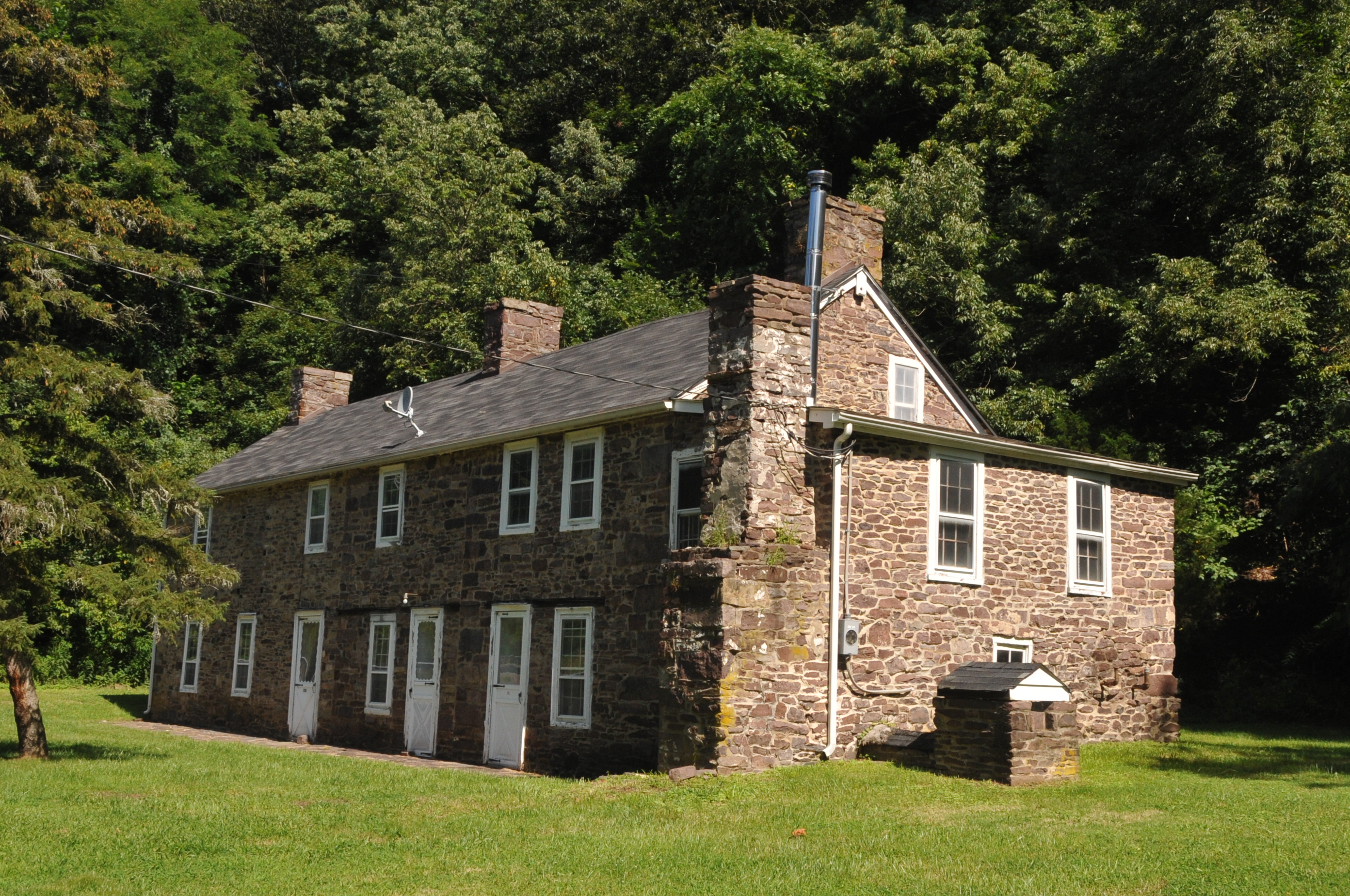
Saxtonville Tavern

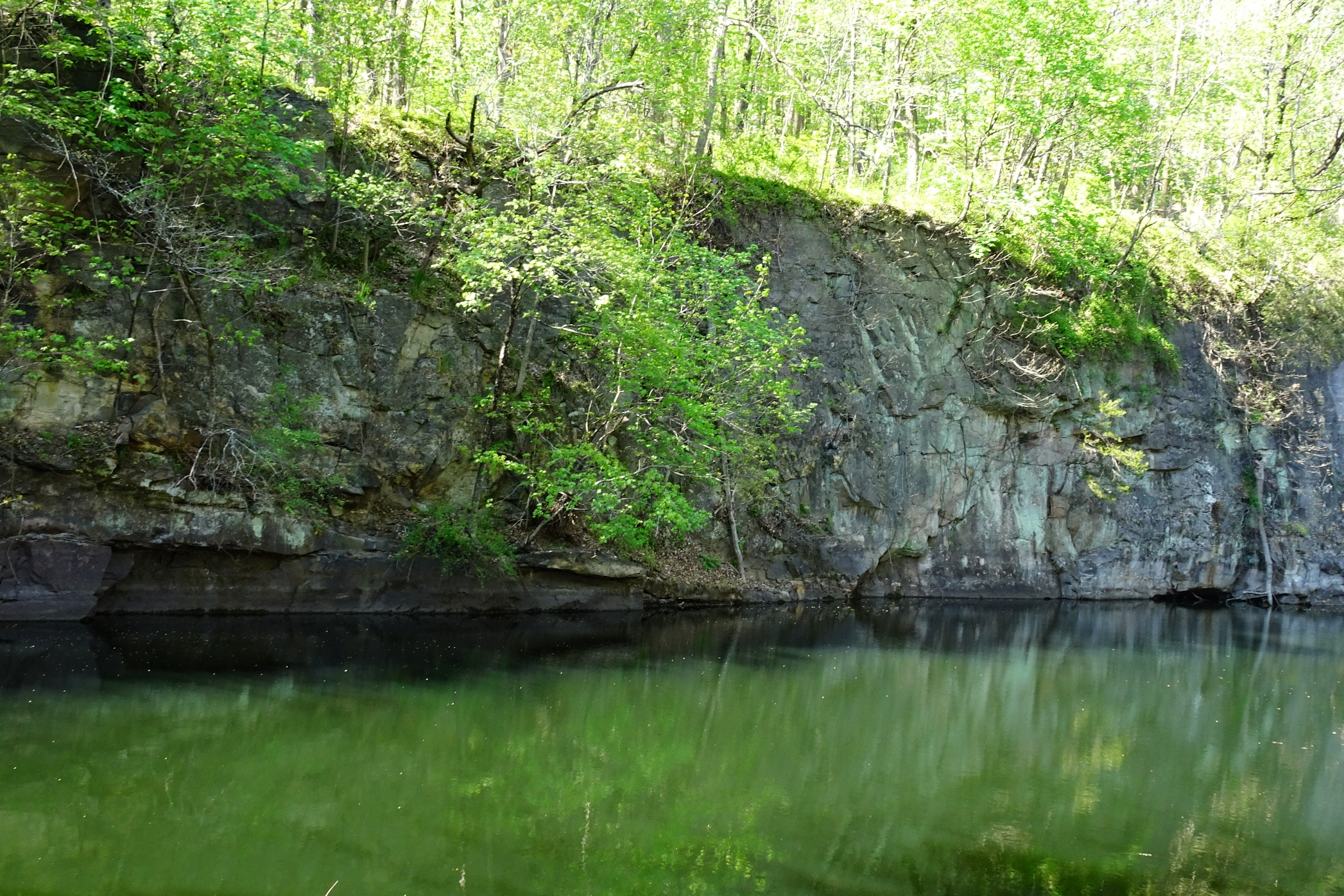
Abandoned Raven Rock Quarry
