= George Wall (military officer) =

George Wall (1743–1804) was an American military officer, entrepreneur, and inventor.

Born in Bucks County, Pennsylvania to a schoolmaster and his wife, George Wall Jr. and his father, George Wall Sr. were both members of the Bucks County Second Battalion. During the Revolutionary War, George Wall Jr. followed General George Washington in various campaigns, and in 1778 became Colonel and lieutenant of Bucks.

Wall also founded the town of Wall’s Landing (now known as Lumberville), where the Paunacussing Creek meets the Delaware River. In Wall’s Landing he built two saw mills, a grist mill, a general store, a school for surveyors, and he served as Justice of the Peace. Wall’s Landing became an important hub of lumber manufacturing and trade in the Philadelphia area. He was elected as a member to the American Philosophical Society in 1785.

George Wall died in 1804.
