= Lumberville, Pennsylvania =

Unincorporated community in Pennsylvania, US

- Unincorporated community
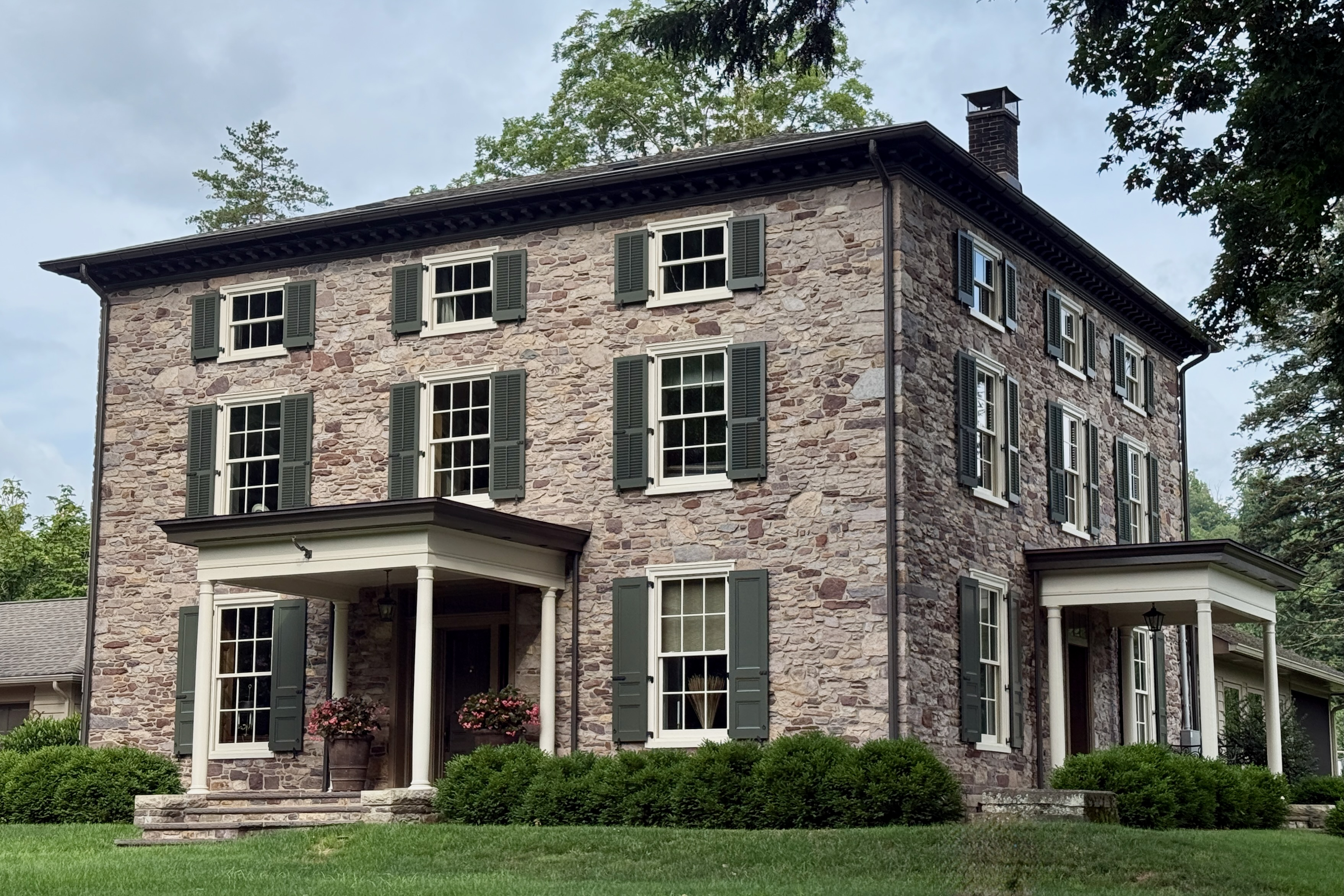
- Historic stone house overlooking the river

- Location within Pennsylvania
- Coordinates: 40°24′24″N 75°02′17″W
- Country: United States
- State: Pennsylvania
- County: Bucks
- Township: Solebury
- Elevation: 102 ft (31 m)
- Time zone: UTC-5 (Eastern (EST))
  - Summer (DST): UTC-4 (EDT)
- ZIP Code: 18933
- Area codes: 215, 267 and 445
- GNIS feature ID: 1180077

Lumberville is a village on the Delaware River in Solebury Township, Pennsylvania, United States. It is located seven miles north of New Hope and is situated along River Road. Its ZIP Code is 18933.

The village was settled by Colonel George Wall, a Revolutionary War officer and Bucks County sheriff. He acquired 15 acres of land in 1775 and established two saw mills, a general store, and a school for surveyors. As such, it was originally named Wall's Saw Mills and Walls Landing. The mills changed hands frequently over the next century and were ultimately abandoned in the late 1800s.

The Black Bass Hotel was built in the early 1740s. It had many names over the years including Wall's Tavern, The Lumberville Hotel, Temple Bar, and The Rising Sun. It fell into decline in the late 19th century, until it was purchased in 1949 by Herbert (Herbie) Ward. He revived the business and ran it until his death 54 years later. The property was purchased by Jack Thompson, owner of the Thompson auto dealerships in Doylestown, in 2008 and underwent a major refurbishment in 2009. Thompson died in December 2020. His family continues to operate the inn and restaurant.

In 1835, a covered bridge was built across the Delaware River to Raven Rock, New Jersey. The river is approximately 800 feet wide at this point. One span of it was carried away in the flood of 1903. That section of the bridge was rebuilt as a steel span. The bridge was used until 1946. In 1949, a new bridge was built on the piers of the original, but it was built only for foot traffic so that the people of Lumberville could have access to the Pennsylvania Railroad commuter passenger service in Raven Rock. The rail service was discontinued in 1952.

The Delaware Canal runs along the river. Lumberville was the location of Lock #12, a set of locks to raise and lower the barges that travelled between Easton and Bristol, Pennsylvania. The lock house was washed away in the flood of 1955.

== Notable people ==
- Paul and Julia Child were married in Lumberville on September 1, 1946
- Eden Gray, actress and writer on tarot cards who lived in Lumberville during the 1930s and 1940s
- Martin Johnson Heade, 19th century artist
- From 1839 to 1840, Lumberville was the home of John Greenleaf Whittier.

== Historic district ==
The Lumberville Historic District was listed on the National Register of Historic Places in 1984.

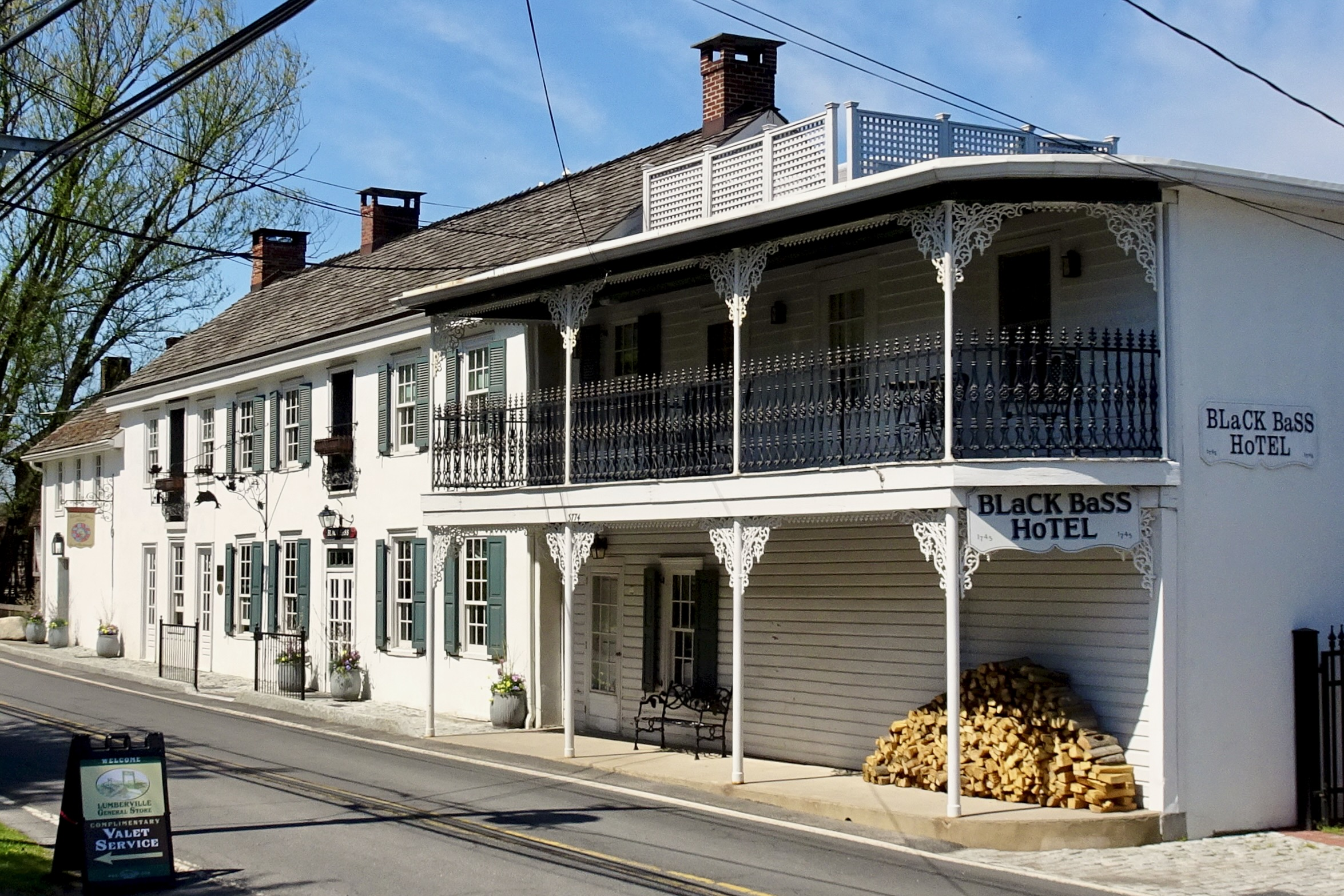
Black Bass Hotel

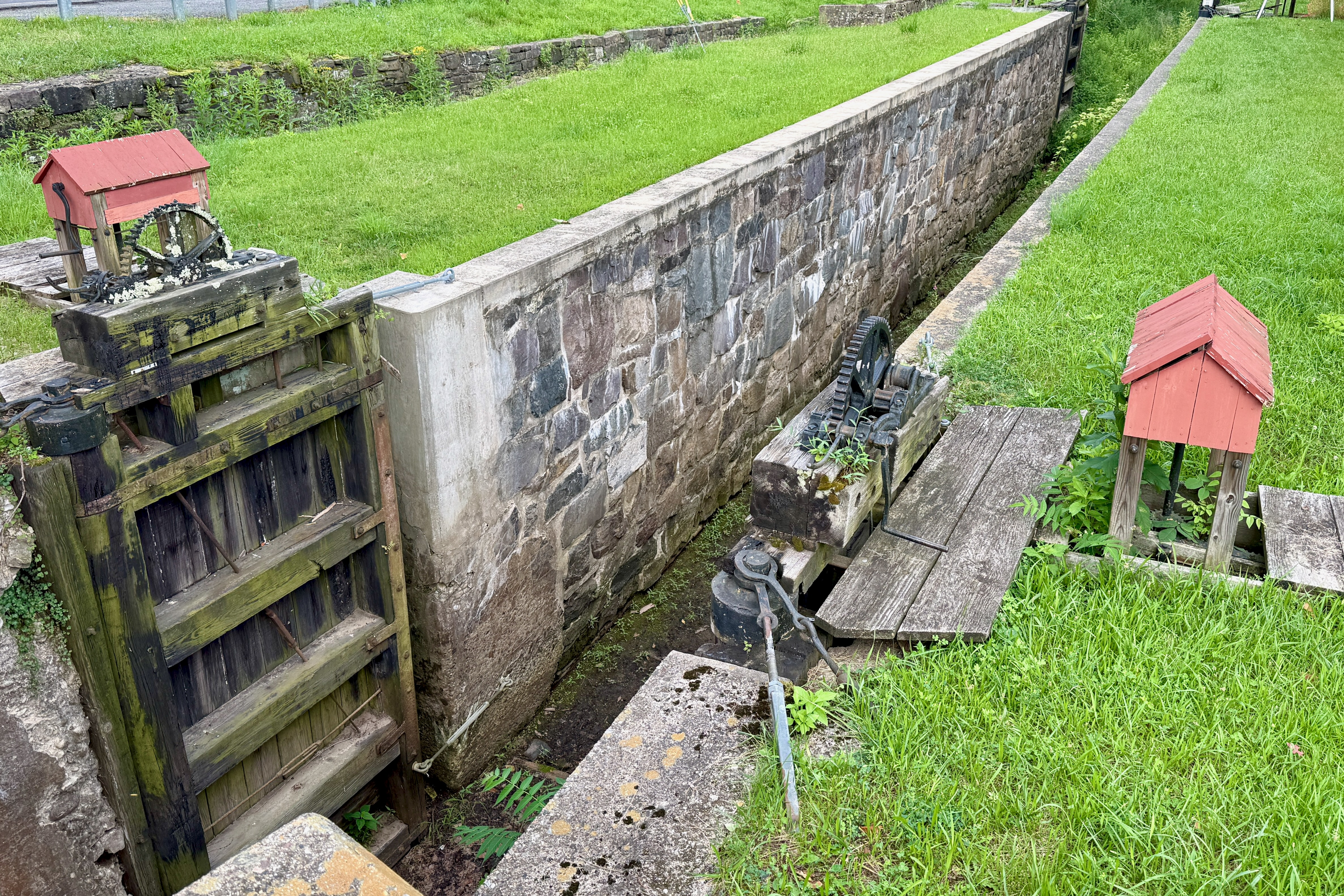
Lock #12 of the Delaware Canal
