= Lumberville–Raven Rock Bridge =

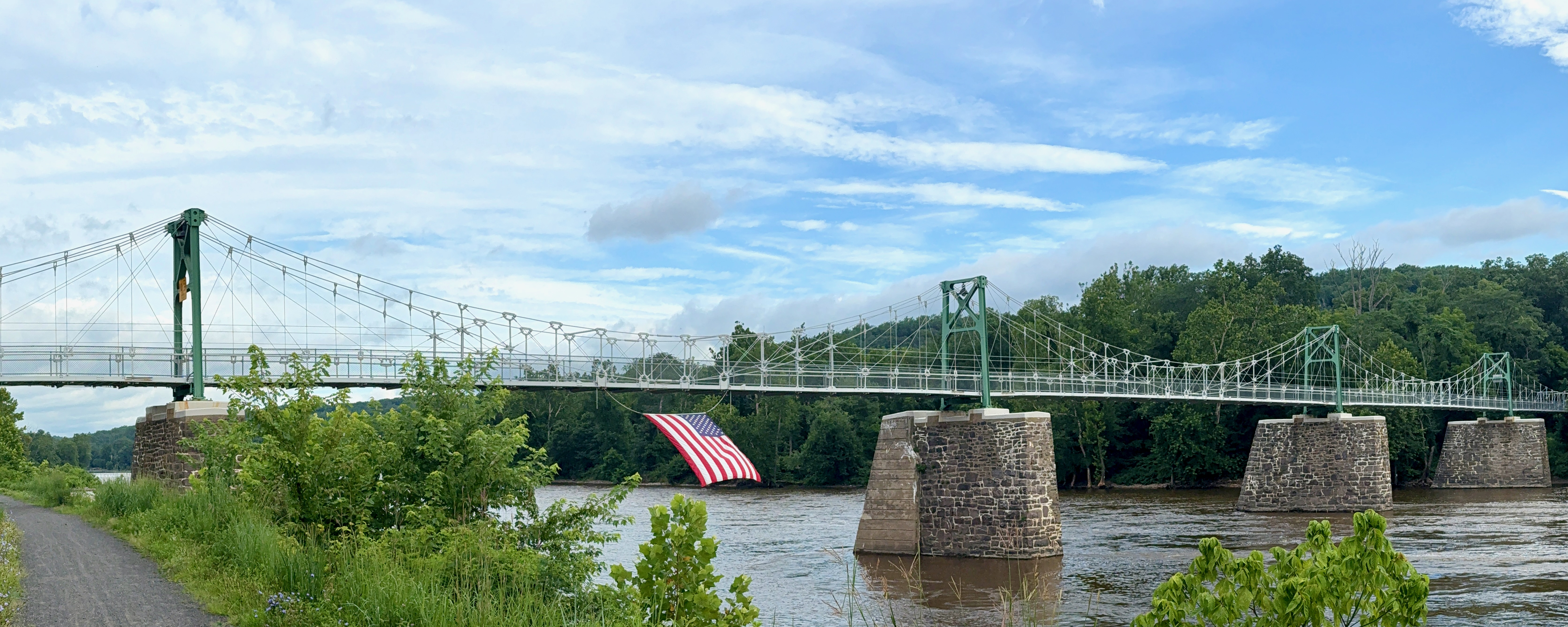
- The Roebling-built pedestrian bridge in 2025
- Coordinates: 40°24′28″N 75°02′14″W
- Carries: Pedestrians
- Crosses: Delaware River
- Locale: Raven Rock, New Jersey and Lumberville, Pennsylvania
- Maintained by: Delaware River Joint Toll Bridge Commission

Characteristics
- Design: Suspension bridge
- Total length: 688 feet (210 m)

History
- Opened: November 1947

Location
- Interactive map of Lumberville–Raven Rock Bridge

The Lumberville–Raven Rock Bridge, also known as the Lumberville Foot Bridge, is a free pedestrian bridge over the Delaware River. The bridge connects Bull's Island Recreation Area near Raven Rock, Delaware Township in Hunterdon County, New Jersey to Lumberville, Solebury Township in Bucks County, Pennsylvania, United States. The bridge, which is one of the two exclusively pedestrian bridges over the Delaware River, is owned and operated by the Delaware River Joint Toll Bridge Commission.

== History ==
The Pennsylvania and New Jersey legislatures approved the construction of a bridge at Lumberville in 1835-1836, however construction was not begun until 1853. This delay spared the bridge the possible ravages of a major flood in 1841. The bridge, with four spans crossing the river and another crossing the Delaware Canal, was a wooden covered type, engineered by Solon Chapin of Easton, Pennsylvania, and a partner, Anthony Fry. The bridge was built by the Lumberville Delaware River Bridge Company and was completed in 1856.

The original covered bridge incurred major damage in the flood of 1903 and one of the three river spans was washed away. Repairs were made and the single missing span was replaced in 1904 by a steel truss section. The toll bridge was sold to the DRJTBC in 1932. The replacement span served until February 1944 when the remaining timber spans were declared unsafe and condemned. The Joint Toll Bridge Commission determined at that time that there was no longer a need for a vehicular bridge at the site. In 1947, the Trenton firm of John A Roebling's Sons, Co. was hired to replace the structure with a pedestrian bridge. The original 1855 piers and abutments were deemed sound. At a total cost of $75,000, the bridge was rebuilt as a five-span suspension bridge. A major flood in 1955 destroyed several Delaware River bridges but the Lumberville–Raven Rock bridge survived and remains in use today.

A major rehabilitation contract was completed in 1993. The project included a new deck, new lighting and repainting. The bridge is adjacent to the Delaware Canal State Park on Quarry Road at Daniel Bray Highway (New Jersey Route 29) in Stockton, New Jersey. The park has a visitors center, rest rooms and a parking lot.

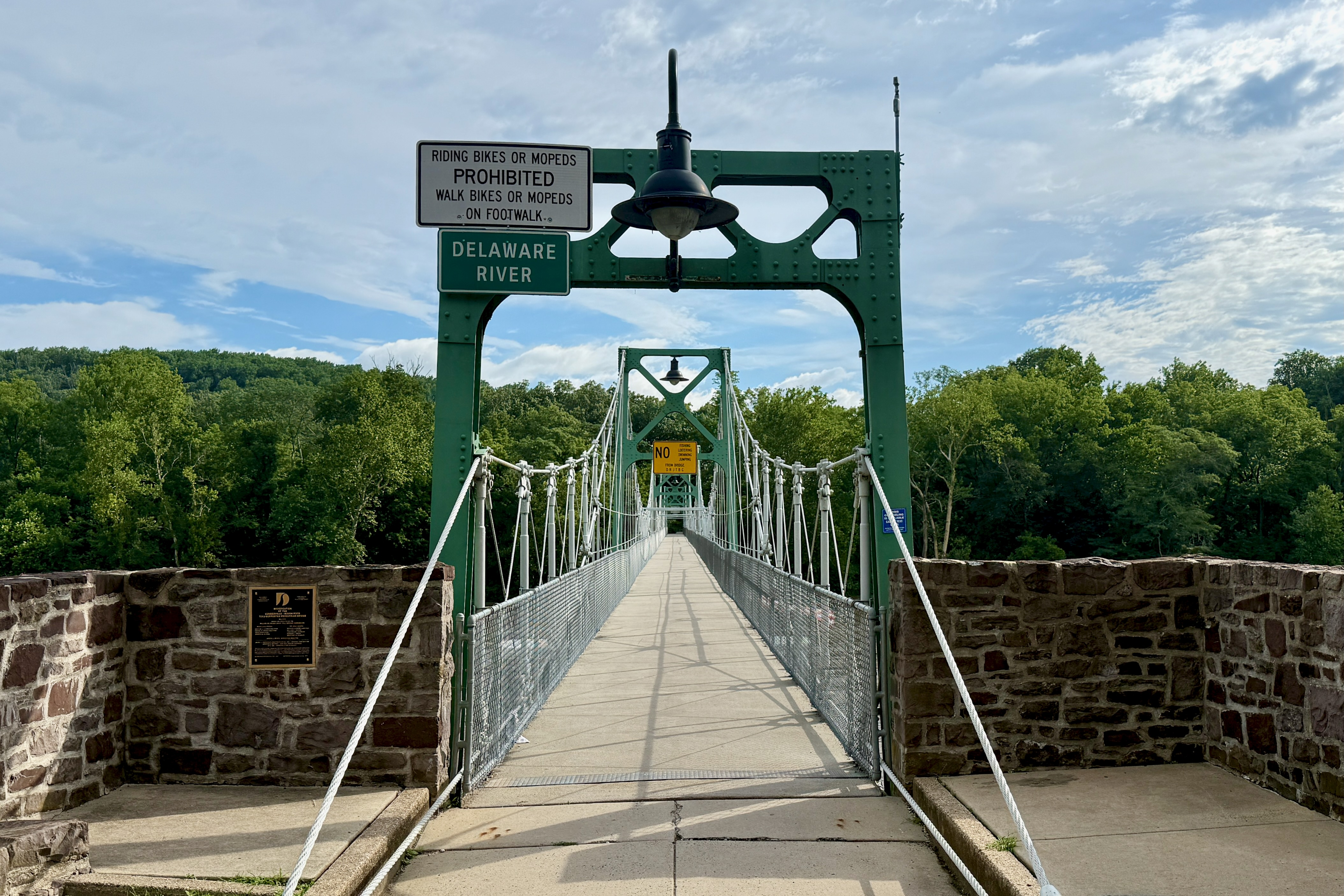
Approach to the bridge from Lumberville with Bull's Island in the background

== See also ==
- List of crossings of the Delaware River
- Delaware and Raritan Canal State Park (New Jersey)
- Delaware Canal State Park (Pennsylvania)
