= Easton–Phillipsburg Toll Bridge =

Easton-Phillipsburg Toll Bridge
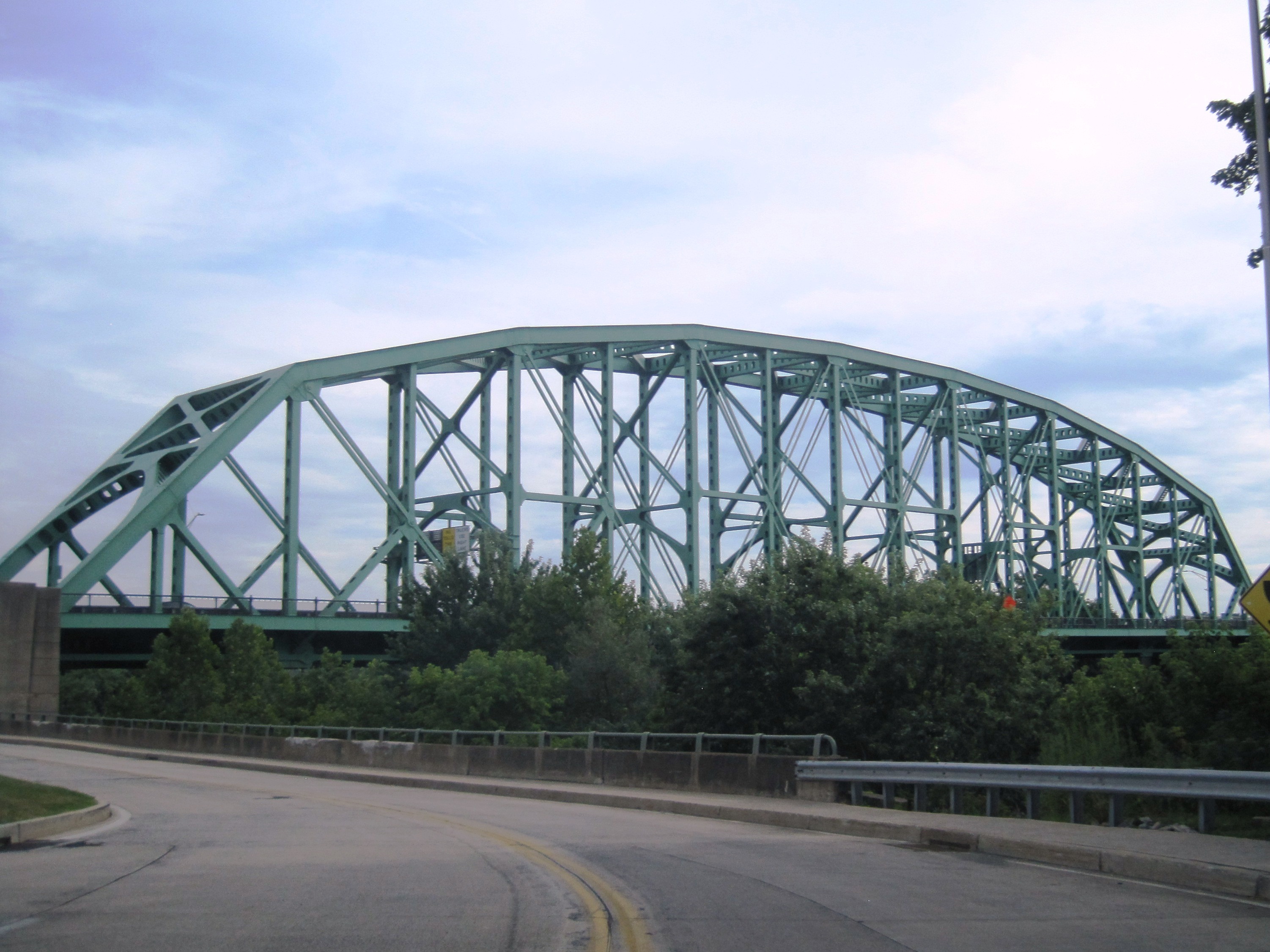
- Easton–Phillipsburg Toll Bridge connecting Pennsylvania in Easton with New Jersey in Phillipsburg
- Coordinates: 40°41′40″N 75°12′13″W
- Carries: 4 lanes of US 22
- Crosses: Delaware River
- Locale: Easton, Pennsylvania and Phillipsburg, New Jersey
- Official name: Easton–Phillipsburg Toll Bridge
- Maintained by: Delaware River Joint Toll Bridge Commission

Characteristics
- Design: modified steel Pennsylvania (Petit) truss bridge
- Total length: 1,020 feet (310.9 m)
- Width: 40 feet (12.2 m)
- Longest span: 540 feet (164.6 m)

History
- Opened: January 14, 1938

Statistics
- Toll: Westbound: $5.00 for cars without E-ZPass $2.00 for cars with E-ZPass

Location
- Interactive map of Easton-Phillipsburg Toll Bridge

The Easton–Phillipsburg Toll Bridge is a modified Pennsylvania (Petit) through truss bridge that carries U.S. Route 22 over the Delaware River. The bridge is located between Easton, Pennsylvania and Phillipsburg, New Jersey in the Lehigh Valley.

The Easton–Phillipsburg Toll Bridge opened on January 14, 1938, and is operated by the Delaware River Joint Toll Bridge Commission.

== Features ==
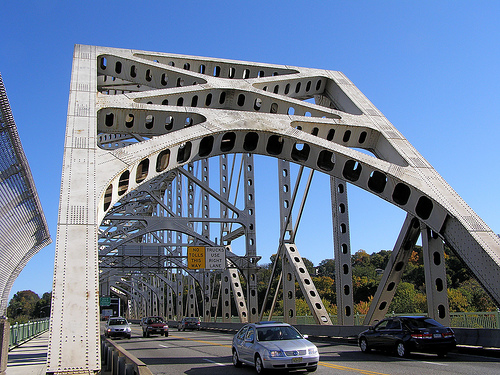
The western side of the bridge in Easton, Pennsylvania.

The main river bridge consists of a 540-foot (160 m) Petit through-truss span over the river; a 430-foot (130 m), five-span plate-girder viaduct at the New Jersey approach, and a 40-foot (12 m) pre-stressed concrete box beam span over Pennsylvania Route 611 on the Pennsylvania approach.

The overall length is 1,020 feet (310 m). The four-lane facility has a roadway width of 40 feet (12 m). There are 8-foot (2.4 m) concrete pedestrian sidewalks outside the trusses on each side. The bridge is the 9th-longest (main span) simple truss and 9th-longest (main span) steel truss in the United States. When it was constructed in 1938, the bridge was the longest steel truss in the United States, a distinction it held for 19 years.

== Tolls ==
The toll plaza collects only westbound lanes going into Pennsylvania, and includes the E-ZPass system. As of January 1, 2026, the toll rate per car is $5.00, or $2.00 if E-ZPass is used. Higher tolls are charged for vehicles larger than passenger cars.

== See also ==
- List of crossings of the Delaware River
