= List of U.S. Routes in New Jersey =

- Standard route signs in New Jersey

Highway names
- Interstates: Interstate X (I-X)
- US Highways: U.S. Route X (US X)
- State: Route X

System links
- New Jersey State Highway Routes; Interstate; US; State; Scenic Byways

The following is a complete list of all US Routes that run through the state of New Jersey.

== Mainline routes ==
Number	Length (mi)	Length (km)	Southern or western terminus	Northern or eastern terminus	Formed	Removed	Notes
US 1	66.06	106.31	Trenton–Morrisville Toll Bridge at the Pennsylvania state line in Trenton	George Washington Bridge at the New York state line in Fort Lee	1926	current	Joins a concurrency signed as US 1-9
US 9	166.34	267.70	Cape May-Lewes Ferry in North Cape May	George Washington Bridge at the New York state line in Fort Lee	1926	current	Joins a concurrency signed as US 1-9
US 9W	11.17	17.98	I-95 / N.J. Turnpike / US 1-9 / US 46 / Route 4 in Fort Lee	US 9W at the New York state line in Alpine	1926	current	
US 22	60.53	97.41	Easton–Phillipsburg Toll Bridge at the Pennsylvania state line in Phillipsburg	I-78 / US 1-9 / Route 21 in Newark	1926	current	
US 30	58.26	93.76	Ben Franklin Bridge at the Pennsylvania state line in Camden	Virginia Avenue in Atlantic City	1926	current	
US 40	64.32	103.51	Delaware Memorial Bridge at the Delaware state line in Pennsville Township	Atlantic Avenue and Pacific Avenue in Atlantic City	1926	current	
US 46	75.34	121.25	I-80 / Route 94 in Columbia (Knowlton Township)	George Washington Bridge at the New York state line in Fort Lee	1935	current	
US 122	80.31	129.25	New Hope-Lambertville Bridge at the Pennsylvania state line in Lambertville	US 122 at the New York state line near Mahwah	1926	1934	Now US 202
US 130	83.46	134.32	I-295 / US 40 in Pennsville Township	US 1 in North Brunswick	1927	current	
US 202	80.31	129.25	New Hope-Lambertville Toll Bridge at the Pennsylvania state line Lambertville	US 202 at the New York in Mahwah	1934	current	
US 206	129.77	208.84	White Horse Pike (US 30) and Bellevue Avenue (Route 54) in Hammonton	Milford-Montague Toll Bridge at the Pennsylvania state line in Montague Township	1934	current	
US 322	62.81	101.08	Commodore Barry Bridge at the Pennsylvania state line in Bridgeport (Logan Township)	Atlantic Avenue and Pacific Avenue in Atlantic City	1936	current	
US 611	—	—	Portland-Columbia Toll Bridge at the Pennsylvania state line in Columbia (Knowlton Township)	Interstate 80 Toll Bridge at the Pennsylvania state line in Worthington State Forest	1953	1973	
Former

== Special routes ==
Number	Length (mi)	Length (km)	Southern or western terminus	Northern or eastern terminus	Formed	Removed	Notes
US 1 Bus.	2.73	4.39	US 1 in Trenton	US 1 in Lawrence Township	1988	current	
US 1-9 Truck	4.35	7.00	US 1-9 in Newark	US 1-9 / Route 139 in Jersey City	1953	current	
US 206 Byp.	2.77	4.46	US 206 in Hillsborough Township	US 206 in Hillsborough Township	2013	current	
US 322 Bus.	1.53	2.46	US 322 / Route 45 in Harrison Township	US 322 in Harrison Township	2012	current	Unsigned highway

== See also ==
- State highways in New Jersey
- List of Interstate Highways in New Jersey
- List of state highways in New Jersey
- County routes in New Jersey
