= Portland-Columbia Bridge =

Portland-Columbia Bridge may refer to:

- Portland-Columbia Toll Bridge
- Portland-Columbia Pedestrian Bridge
