= Brook Hollow Winery =

American winery located in New Jersey

Coordinates: 40.933538°N 75.084643°W

- Location: 594 Route 94, Columbia, New Jersey, U.S.
- Coordinates: 40.933538 N, 75.084643 W
- Appellation: Warren Hills AVA
- First vines planted: 2002
- Opened to the public: 2007
- Key people: Paul Ritter (owner)
- Area cultivated: 8
- Cases/yr: 1,050 (2011)
- Distribution: On-site, home shipment
- Tasting: Tastings on weekends
- Website: http://www.brookhollowwinery.com/

Brook Hollow Winery is a winery in the Columbia section of Knowlton Township in Warren County, New Jersey. Brook Hollow's original vineyard was first planted in 2002, and opened to the public in 2007. In 2013, the winery moved to a new location in Columbia. Brook Hollow has 8 acres of grapes under cultivation, and produces 1,050 cases of wine per year. The winery is named for a hollow created by Yards Creek, a stream that runs through the farm's original location.

== Wines ==
Brook Hollow Winery is in the Warren Hills AVA, and produces wine from Cabernet Sauvignon, Cayuga White, Chambourcin, Chancellor, Chardonnay, Concord, Frontenac, Merlot, Riesling, Vidal blanc, Zinfandel, and other grapes. Brook Hollow also makes fruit wines from cranberries. It is the only winery in New Jersey that produces wine from Geneva Red, which is a red hybrid grape developed in New York in 1947.

== Licensing and associations ==
Brook Hollow has a farm winery license from the New Jersey Division of Alcoholic Beverage Control, which allows it to produce up to 50,000 gallons of wine per year, operate up to 15 off-premises sales rooms, and ship up to 12 cases per year to consumers in-state or out-of-state. The winery is a member of the Garden State Wine Growers Association and its subsidiary, Vintage North Jersey.

== See also ==
- Alcohol laws of New Jersey
- American wine
- Judgment of Princeton
- List of wineries, breweries, and distilleries in New Jersey
- New Jersey Farm Winery Act
- New Jersey Wine Industry Advisory Council
- New Jersey wine
