= Fairview Schoolhouse =

- U.S. National Register of Historic Places
- New Jersey Register of Historic Places
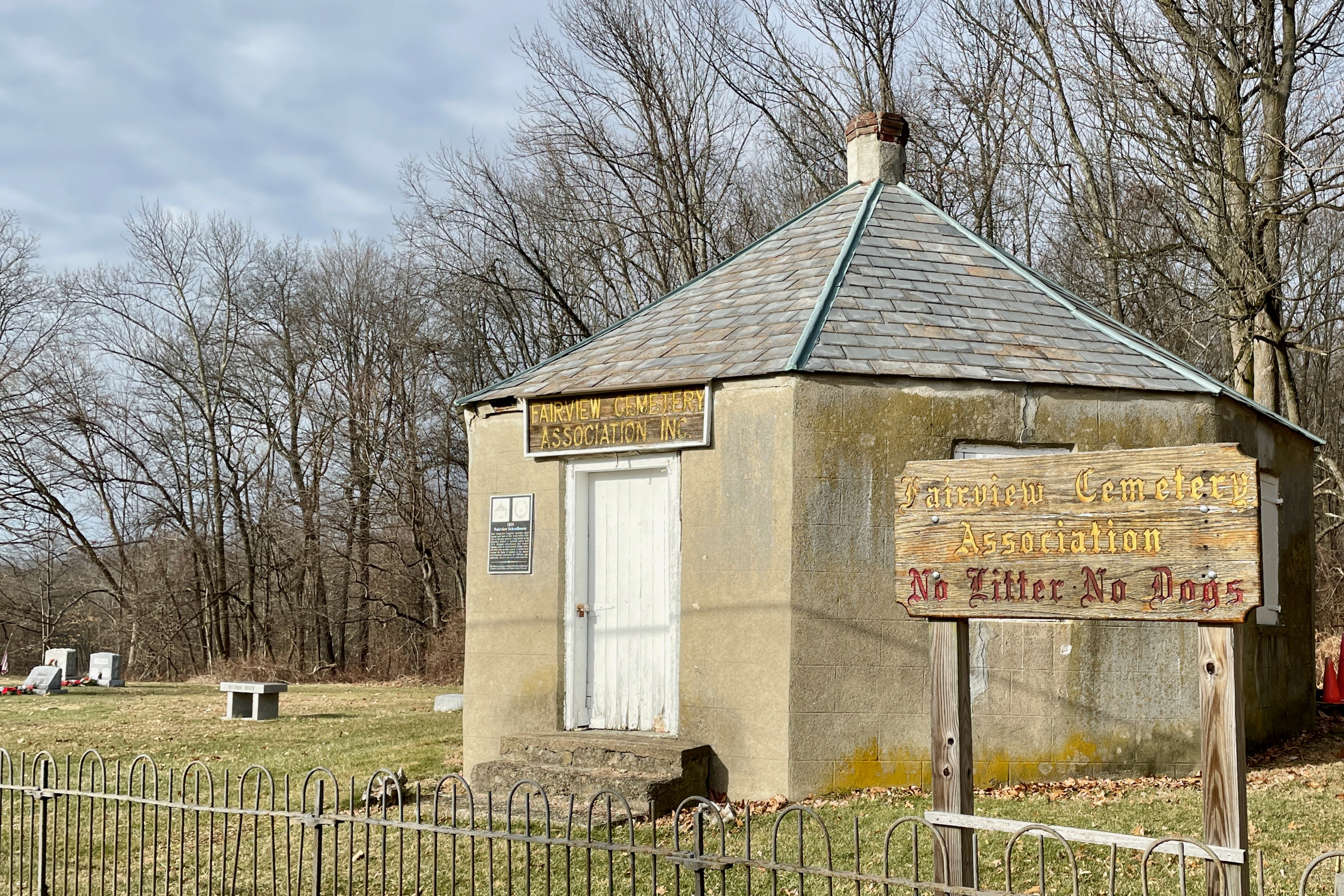
- Now owned by the Fairview Cemetery Association

- Location within Warren County, New Jersey Location within New Jersey Location within the United States
- Location: Fairview Cemetery, Dean Road, Knowlton Township, New Jersey
- Nearest city: Columbia, New Jersey
- Coordinates: 40°55′17″N 75°0′52″W
- Built: 1835
- Built by: George Flummerfelt
- Architectural style: Octagon
- NRHP reference No.: 77000916
- NJRHP No.: 2767

Significant dates
- Added to NRHP: August 12, 1977
- Designated NJRHP: December 20, 1976

The Fairview Schoolhouse is located east of Columbia in the Fairview Cemetery along Dean Road in Knowlton Township in Warren County, New Jersey, United States. It was built in 1835 and documented by the Historic American Buildings Survey (HABS) in 1937. The schoolhouse was added to the National Register of Historic Places on August 12, 1977, for its significance in architecture and education. It is now used by the Fairview Cemetery Association.

== History and description ==
The one-story stone schoolhouse was built in 1835 by George Flummerfelt. The octagon shape of the building may have influenced Orson Squire Fowler and his work on octagon houses in 1848. It use as a school ended in 1874 and it then served as a tool shed for the cemetery.

== See also ==
- National Register of Historic Places listings in Warren County, New Jersey
- List of octagonal buildings and structures in the United States
