= Ramsaysburg Homestead =

- U.S. National Register of Historic Places
- New Jersey Register of Historic Places
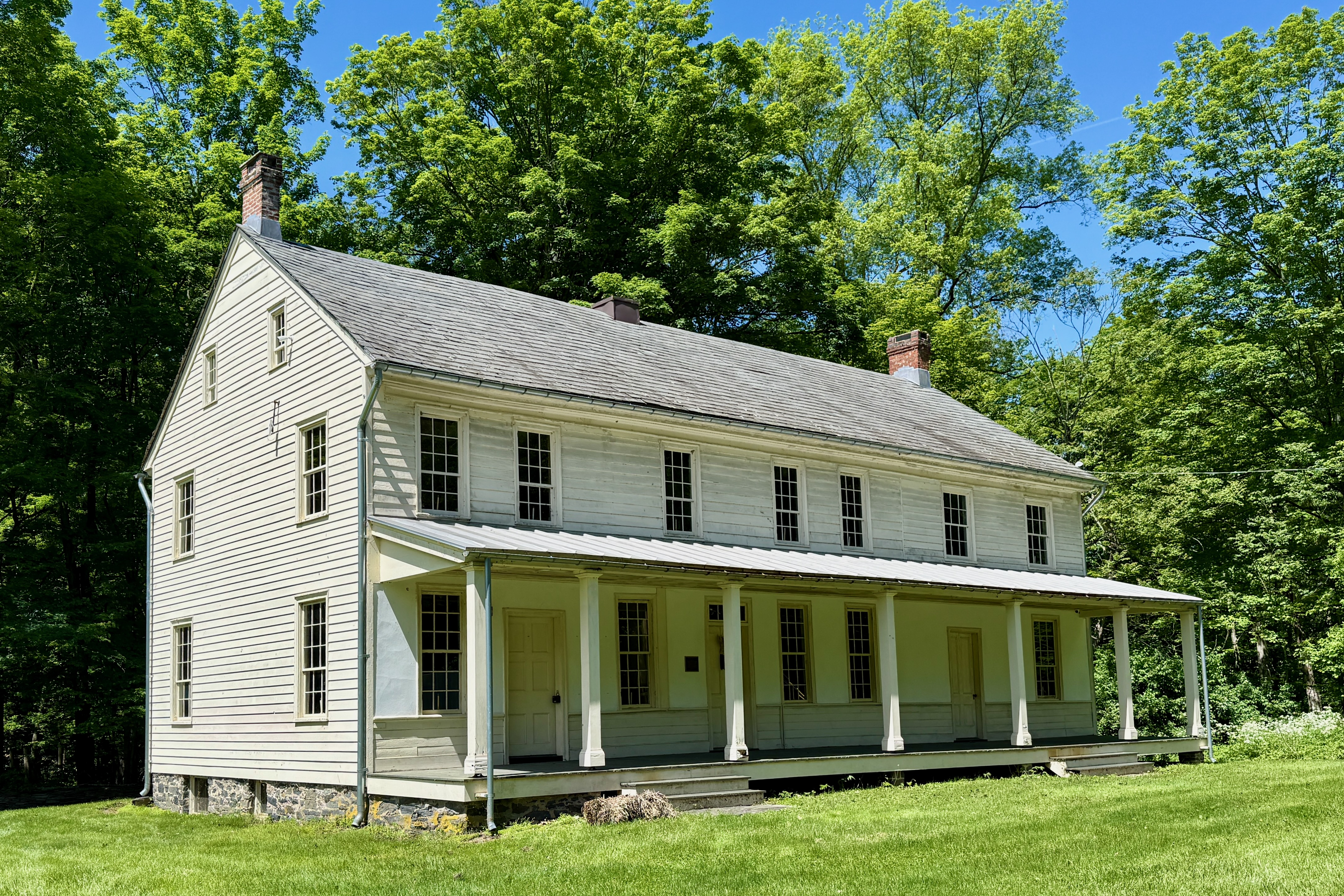

- Location within Warren County, New Jersey Location within New Jersey Location within the United States
- Location: U.S. Route 46, Knowlton Township, New Jersey
- Coordinates: 40°52′40″N 75°03′21″W
- Area: 11.7 acres (4.7 ha)
- Architectural style: Greek Revival, Georgian
- NRHP reference No.: 04001194
- NJRHP No.: 3744

Significant dates
- Added to NRHP: October 27, 2004
- Designated NJRHP: August 13, 2003

The Ramsaysburg Homestead, also known as the Ramsaysburg Tavern, is located along the Delaware River, at the intersection of U.S. Route 46 and Ramseysburg Road, in Knowlton Township of Warren County, New Jersey, United States. It is 1 mile (1.6 km) south of the community of Delaware. The historic house was added to the National Register of Historic Places on October 27, 2004, for its significance in architecture and commerce.

== History and description ==
In 1795, the brothers James and Adam Ramsay, Irish immigrants, purchased 50 acres (20 ha) along the Delaware River. The southern part of this two-story frame house was probably built at this time. The northern part was likely built from 1830 to 1850. It features Georgian and Greek Revival architecture. In 1827, James Ramsay was the postmaster of a new post office named Ramsaysburg.

== See also ==
- National Register of Historic Places listings in Warren County, New Jersey
