= New Jersey Route 94 =

State highway in northwestern New Jersey, US

Route 94

Route information
- Maintained by NJDOT and DRJTBC
- Length: 45.9 mi (73.9 km)
- Existed: January 1, 1953–present
- Tourist routes: Western Highlands Scenic Byway

Major junctions
- South end: Portland-Columbia Toll Bridge at the Pennsylvania state line in Columbia
- I-80 / US 46 in Knowlton Township; US 206 in Newton; Route 15 in Lafayette Township; Route 23 in Hamburg
- North end: NY 94 at the New York state line near Vernon Township

Location
- Country: United States
- State: New Jersey
- Counties: Warren, Sussex

Highway system
- New Jersey State Highway Routes; Interstate; US; State; Scenic Byways
← Route 93	→ I-95
← Route 7	Route 8	→ US 9

Route 94 is a state highway in the northwestern part of New Jersey, United States. It runs 45.9 mi (73.87 km) from the Portland–Columbia Toll Bridge over the Delaware River in Knowlton Township, Warren County, where it connects to PA 611, northeast to the New York state line in Vernon, Sussex County. At the New York border, New York State Route 94 (NY 94) continues to Newburgh, New York. Route 94 is mostly a two-lane undivided road that runs through mountain and valley areas of Warren and Sussex counties, serving Columbia, Blairstown, Newton, and Hamburg. The route intersects several roads, including U.S. Route 46 (US 46) and Interstate 80 (I-80) in Knowlton Township, US 206 in Newton, Route 15 in Lafayette Township, and Route 23 in Hamburg.

What is now Route 94 was legislated as part of two separate routes in 1927. The portion of road between Route 6/US 46 near the Delaware Bridge to Newton became Route 8, while the route north of Newton to the New York border became a part of Route 31. Prior to 1953, the only portion of Route 31 north of Newton that was a state highway was between North Church and Hamburg. In 1953, Route 94 was designated to replace all of Route 8 as well as Route 31 north of Newton; the number was chosen to match NY 94, and in turn named after the 94th Infantry Division. After the Portland–Columbia Toll Bridge and the Delaware Water Gap Toll Bridge were both completed in December 1953, the southern terminus of Route 94 was cut back to an intersection with US 611 in Columbia, which had been rerouted into New Jersey across both bridges, following a freeway between Columbia and the Delaware Water Gap Toll Bridge that would later become a part of I-80. The former alignment of Route 94 between the Delaware Bridge and the Portland–Columbia Toll Bridge became a part of US 46. In 1965, US 611 was routed out of New Jersey (though US 611 shields would remain on that freeway along with I-80 shields until 1972), and Route 94 still ended at that three-way intersection. Once new ramps were completed in that area in 1972 along with US 611 being decommissioned (being replaced with PA 611), Route 94 was extended to the state line on the Portland–Columbia Toll Bridge. Through the 1960s and 1970s, a freeway was proposed for the Route 94 corridor. This freeway, proposed to be a part of the Interstate Highway System, was never built.

== Route description ==
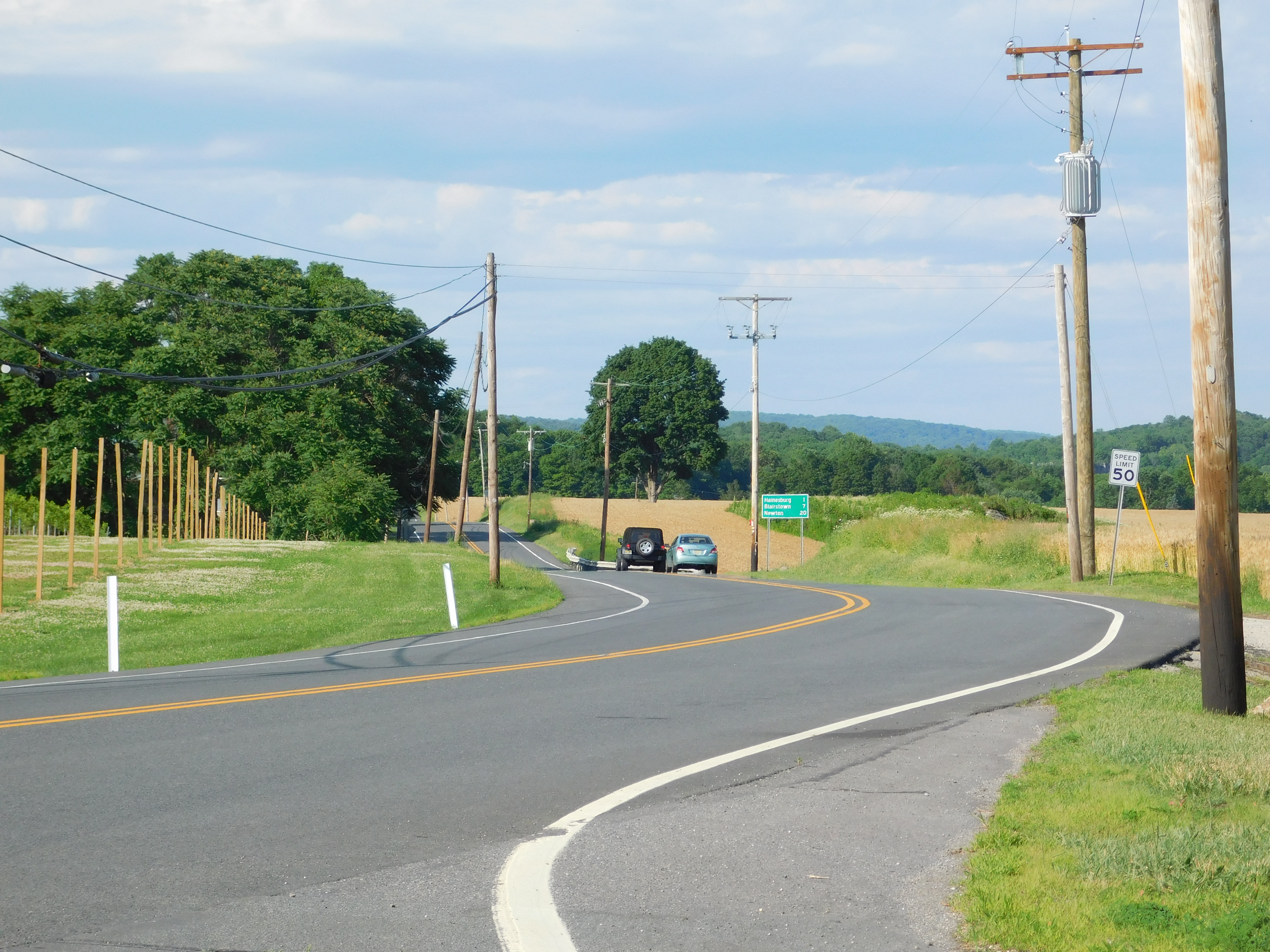
Route 94 in Warrington

=== Warren County ===
Route 94 begins at the two-lane undivided Portland–Columbia Toll Bridge over the Delaware River in Knowlton Township, Warren County, where it connects to PA 611 on the Pennsylvania side of the river. This bridge is maintained by the Delaware River Joint Toll Bridge Commission; the rest of Route 94 is maintained by the New Jersey Department of Transportation (NJDOT). Immediately after the bridge, the route comes to a complex interchange with the western terminus of US 46 as well as with I-80 a short distance later, near the community of Columbia. In the area of the US 46/I-80 interchange, the directions of Route 94 split, carrying two lanes in each direction. Signage for Route 94 begins at the interchange with I-80.

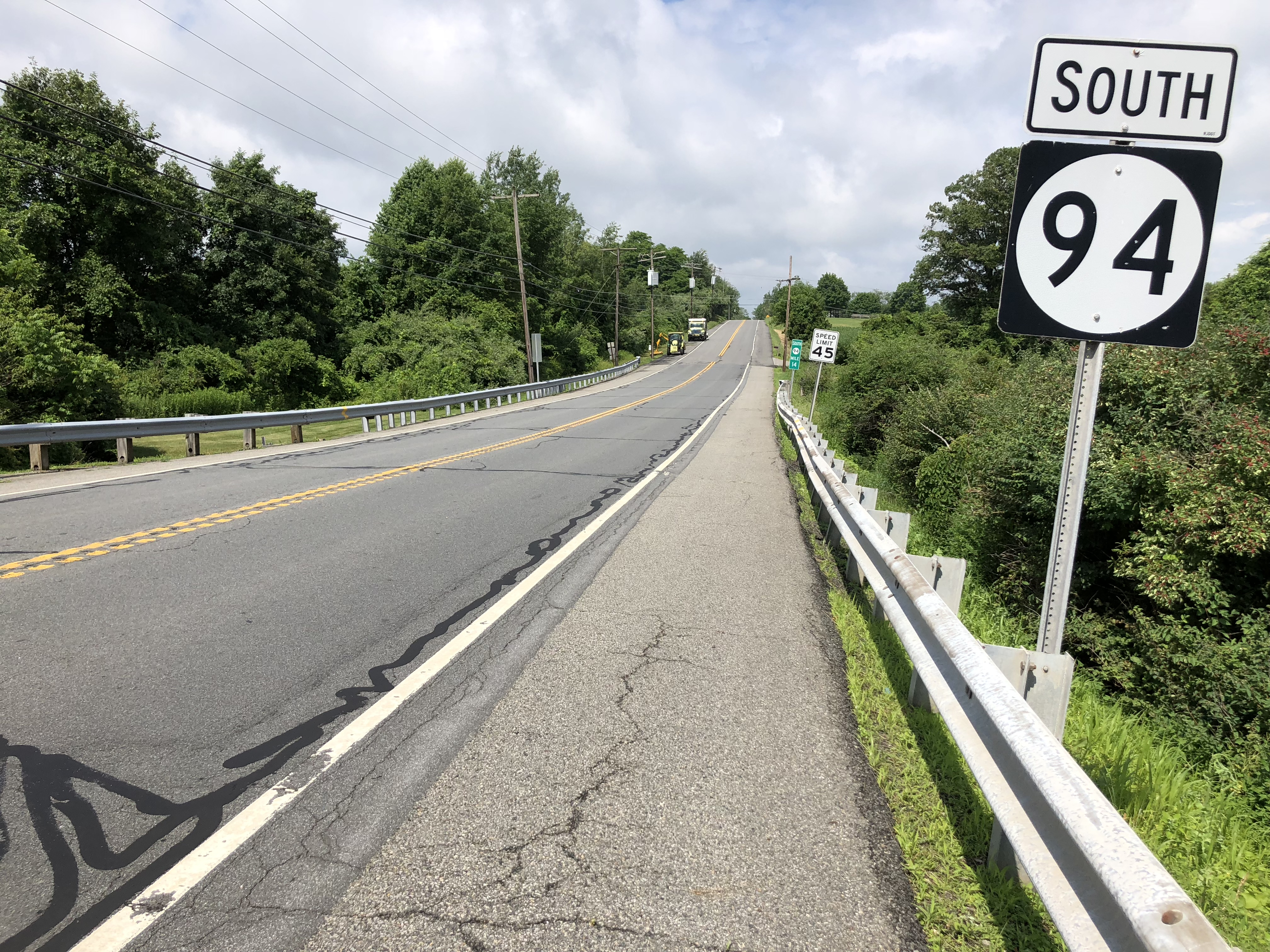
View south along Route 94 at Ramsey Road (CR 661) in Frelinghuysen Township

From here, the route becomes a two-lane undivided road that continues northeast through a mix of woods and farms with some development, passing under the abandoned Lackawanna Cut-Off. After passing through the community of Hainesburg, the road turns more to the east and enters Blairstown. Route 94 turns northeast before reaching the community of Blairstown, where the road continues east past some development before intersecting with Stillwater Road (County Route 521 [CR 521]). It forms a short wrong-way concurrency with that route, along which it crosses the Paulins Kill and CR 521 splits from Route 94 by heading south on Hope Road. A short distance later, Route 94 enters Frelinghuysen Township, passing through more rural surroundings. The road turns northeast through the community of Marksboro before heading east again. After the intersection with Ramsey Road (CR 661), Route 94 makes a sharp turn to the north-northeast.

=== Sussex County ===
The route continues into Sussex County at Fredon Township, heading through rural areas. The road turns more to the northeast as a two-lane road before heading east again and entering Newton. Here, Route 94 becomes High Street and passes several homes, intersecting with West End Avenue (CR 519). CR 519 runs concurrently with Route 94, and the two routes continue into Downtown Newton. In the downtown area, the road comes to the Park Place Square, where it meets the intersection with US 206. At this point, all three routes turn southeast on Park Place, northeast on Main Street, northwest on Spring Street, and run concurrently north on four-lane undivided Water Street for a short distance. CR 519 splits from the road by turning north on Mill Street, while US 206/Route 94 continues north as a three-lane road with a center left-turn lane, where a shopping district lines the road as it leaves Newton for Hampton Township. The road narrows back to two lanes as it heads into areas of farmland. Route 94 splits from US 206 by making a right turn to continue east.

The road passes a mobile home park before making a turn northeast and heading into Lafayette Township. In Lafayette Township, the route resumes to the east through a mix of rural and industrial areas. The road continues to an intersection with Route 15, where Route 94 makes a right turn to head southeast along Route 15 in a wrong-way concurrency. Upon splitting, Route 15 stays straight and heads southeast as Route 94 turns at a right hand reverse jughandle to head northeast. Route 94 continues through more rural areas with occasional development and enters Sparta, where it is known as North Church Road. Here, the road passes near some residential developments before continuing into Hardyston Township. In Hardyston Township, the route runs through the community of North Church. After making a sharp turn to the east, Route 94 enters Hamburg and becomes Vernon Avenue. The route passes a few homes before intersecting with Route 23 in the center of town. From this intersection, the route makes a turn to the northeast before leaving the town and heading back into Hardyston Township. The road passes rural developed areas before entering Vernon.

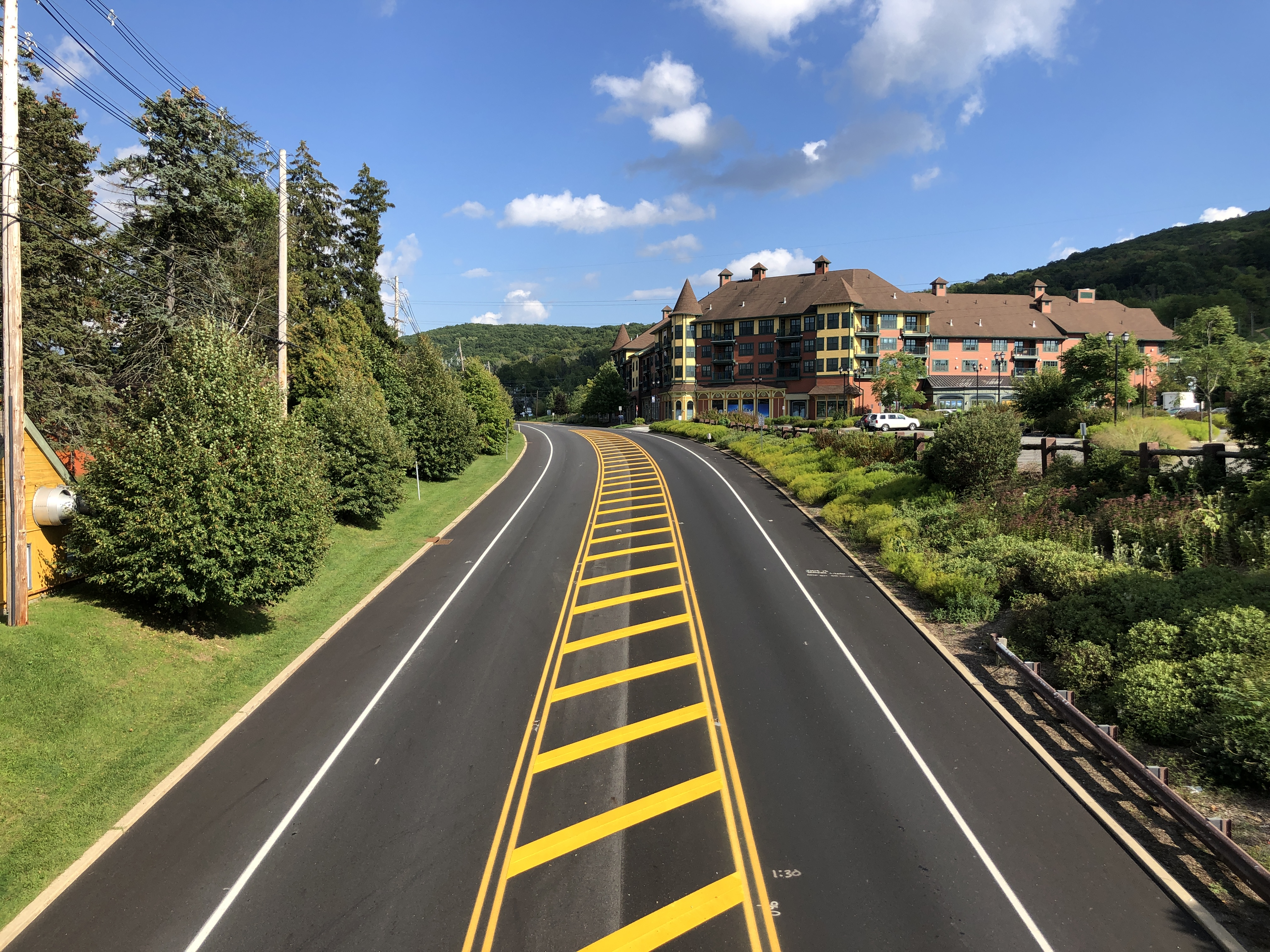
Route 94 facing north at the Mountain Creek ski resort in Vernon

At this point, the surroundings become more wooded and mountainous as the road passes near residential areas and reaches the community of McAfee. In McAfee, McAfee-Glenwood Road (CR 517) intersects with Route 94 and the two routes head east for a short wrong-way concurrency, crossing the New York, Susquehanna and Western Railway's New Jersey Subdivision line before CR 517 turns to the south. Route 94 continues northeast unnamed, briefly becoming a divided highway as it passes the Mountain Creek ski resort and the Mountain Creek Waterpark, passing under a pedestrian bridge between the resort and parking lot. Continuing northeast, the route comes to an intersection with Vernon Road (CR 515), which it runs concurrently with on Vernon-Warwick Road. The two routes continue north; CR 515 splits from Route 94 by turning north on Prices Switch Road a short distance after crossing the Appalachian Trail. From here, Route 94 continues through more countryside before reaching the New York state line, where the road continues into that state as NY 94.

== History ==
Route 8
- Location: Delaware–Newton
- Existed: 1927–1953

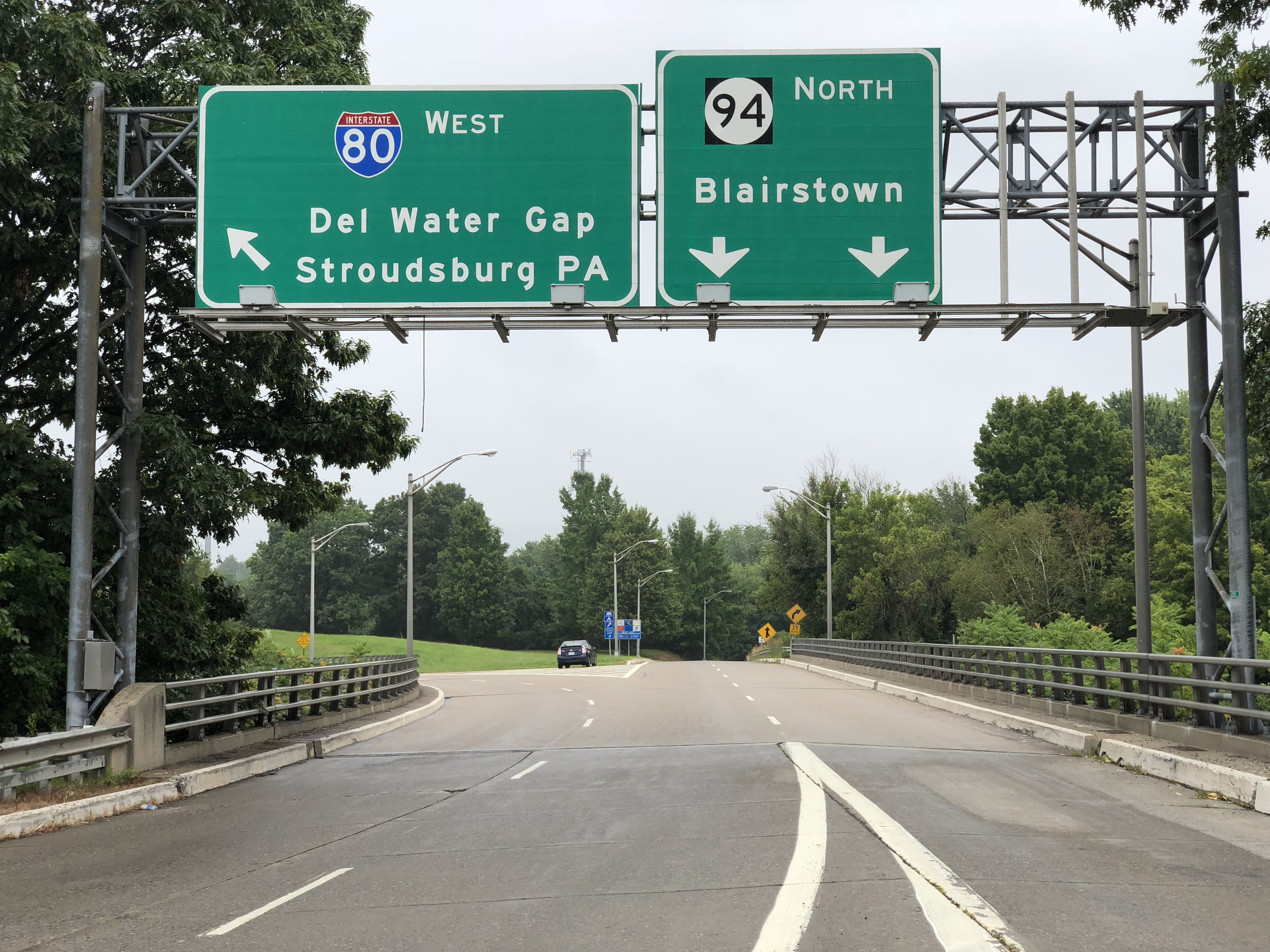
Route 94 northbound at I-80/US 46 in Knowlton Township

Through Vernon, what is now Route 94 was designated as the Vernon Turnpike, which was legislated to run from the Paterson-Hamburg Turnpike to the New York state line. It was abandoned by 1828.

In the 1927 renumbering of state highways, Route 8 was defined to run along present-day Route 94 from Route 6 (current US 46) at the Delaware Bridge north to Columbia before turning northeast to Route 31 (now US 206) in Newton. Past Newton, Route 31 continued northeast to the New York state line (current US 206 north of here was Route S31). In the original version of the renumbering bill, Route 31 was to reach the state line via Sussex, incorporating pre-1927 Route 8 (now Route 284) from Sussex to the New York state line. However, in the final version, Route 31 ran via Hamburg, using the same alignment as a planned spur of pre-1927 Route 8 from Lafayette Township to North Church. Route 8 was eventually taken over by the state. On the other hand, by 1949, only one section of Route 31 north of the Route S31 split had been taken between North Church to Hamburg.

In the 1953 renumbering, Route 8 was renumbered to Route 94, which was extended northeast past Newton along former Route 31 to the New York state line, matching NY 94 across the border. It was initially only marked south of Hamburg, as none of the route north of Hamburg was state-maintained. Originally, Route 94 began at the now razed Delaware Bridge, where US 46 would cross into Pennsylvania. Route 94 would wind right and north-east a few to Columbia, where it joined its current route. In December 1953, both the Portland–Columbia Toll Bridge and Delaware Water Gap Toll Bridge opened. That year a section of Old Mine Road was rebuilt and aligned as a four lane freeway between Columbia and the Delaware Water Gap Toll Bridge.

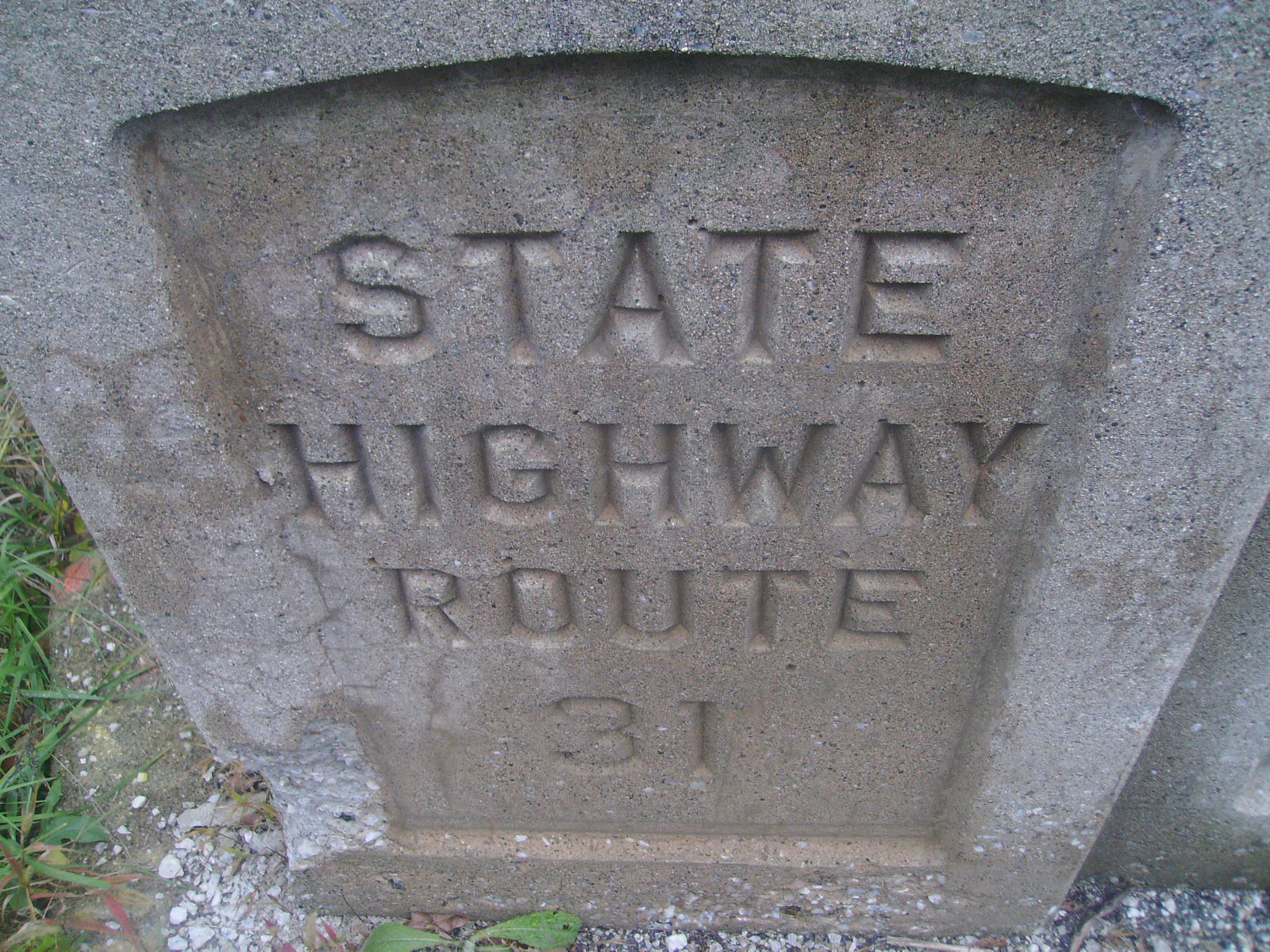
Old SHR 31 indentation on a bridge in Hamburg

Following this, US 46 was rerouted over the first several miles of Route 94 between the Delaware Bridge and Columbia, and Route 94 was cut back to Columbia, near the Portland-Columbia Toll Bridge. Here, US 46 would end and US 611, would cross the Portland-Columbia Toll Bridge from Pennsylvania and follow the freeway north to the Delaware Water Gap Toll Bridge. The freeway portion that US 611 followed became a part of I-80 in 1959. When US 611 was removed from New Jersey in 1965, Route 94 was extended to the state line on the Portland-Columbia Toll Bridge. By 1969, the unsigned portions of Route 94 north of Newton were signed. In 1973, this whole area was realigned into a complex interchange as the New Jersey portion of I-80 was completed.

In 1964, a Route 94 freeway was proposed to run from I-80 in Netcong north to the planned Route 23 freeway in Hamburg, following US 206 north to Newton and current Route 94 to Hamburg. In the late 1960s, NJD0T planned for the Route 94 freeway to run from I-80/US 46 in Columbia northeast to the New York state line near Wawayanda State Park. NJD0T hoped to get funding for the freeway in 1970 for it to become an Interstate Highway as it was planned to serve a proposed national recreation area along the Delaware River that would have been built in conjunction with the controversial Tocks Island Dam project. This proposed Interstate, which was to run from I-80 in Hope Township to I-84 in Port Jervis and continue northeast along US 209, was denied funding. After reviewing the proposal again in 1972, NJDOT determined that the freeway would cost $96 million. It was eventually canceled due to environmental concerns and financial constraints.

== Major intersections ==
County	Location	mi	km	Destinations	Notes
Delaware River		0.0	0.0	To PA 611 – Portland	Southern terminus; Pennsylvania state line
Delaware River		0.0	0.0	Portland–Columbia Toll Bridge (southbound toll in Pennsylvania)	
Warren	Knowlton Township	0.1	0.16	US 46 east – Buttzville, Columbia	Interchange; access to Columbia via Decatur Street; western terminus of US 46; last southbound exit before toll
Warren	Knowlton Township	0.4	0.64	I-80 – Delaware Water Gap, Stroudsburg, Netcong, New York City	Exits 4B-C on I-80
Warren	Blairstown	9.1	14.6	CR 521 north (Stillwater Road) – Stillwater	Southern end of CR 521 concurrency
Warren	Blairstown	9.4	15.1	CR 521 south (Hope Road) to I-80 east – Hope, Bridgeville, Hackettstown	Northern end of CR 521 concurrency
Sussex	Newton	22.1	35.6	CR 519 south (West End Avenue)	Southern end of CR 519 concurrency
Sussex	Newton	22.4	36.0	US 206 south (Main Street) – Netcong, Chester, Somerville	Southern end of US 206 concurrency
Sussex	Newton	22.5	36.2	CR 519 north (Mill Street)	Northern end of CR 519 concurrency
Sussex	Hampton Township	24.9	40.1	US 206 north – Milford	Northern end of US 206 concurrency
Sussex	Lafayette Township	27.7	44.6	Route 15 north – Lafayette	Southern end of Route 15 concurrency
Sussex	Lafayette Township	28.0	45.1	Route 15 south – Dover	Northern end of Route 15 concurrency
Sussex	Hamburg	35.6	57.3	Route 23 – Sussex, Newark	
Sussex	Vernon Township	38.2	61.5	CR 517 north (McAfee-Glenwood Road) – Glenwood	Southern end of CR 517 concurrency
Sussex	Vernon Township	38.6	62.1	CR 517 south (Rudetown Road) – Hardistonville	Northern end of CR 517 concurrency
Sussex	Vernon Township	41.7	67.1	CR 515 south (Vernon Road) – Highland Lakes, Stockholm	Southern end of CR 515 concurrency
Sussex	Vernon Township	43.97	70.76	CR 515 north (Prices Switch Road) – Amity, Pine Island	Northern end of CR 515 concurrency
Sussex	Vernon Township	45.9	73.9	NY 94 east – Warwick	Continuation into New York
1.000 mi = 1.609 km; 1.000 km = 0.621 mi: Concurrency terminus; Tolled
