= Portland–Columbia Toll Bridge =

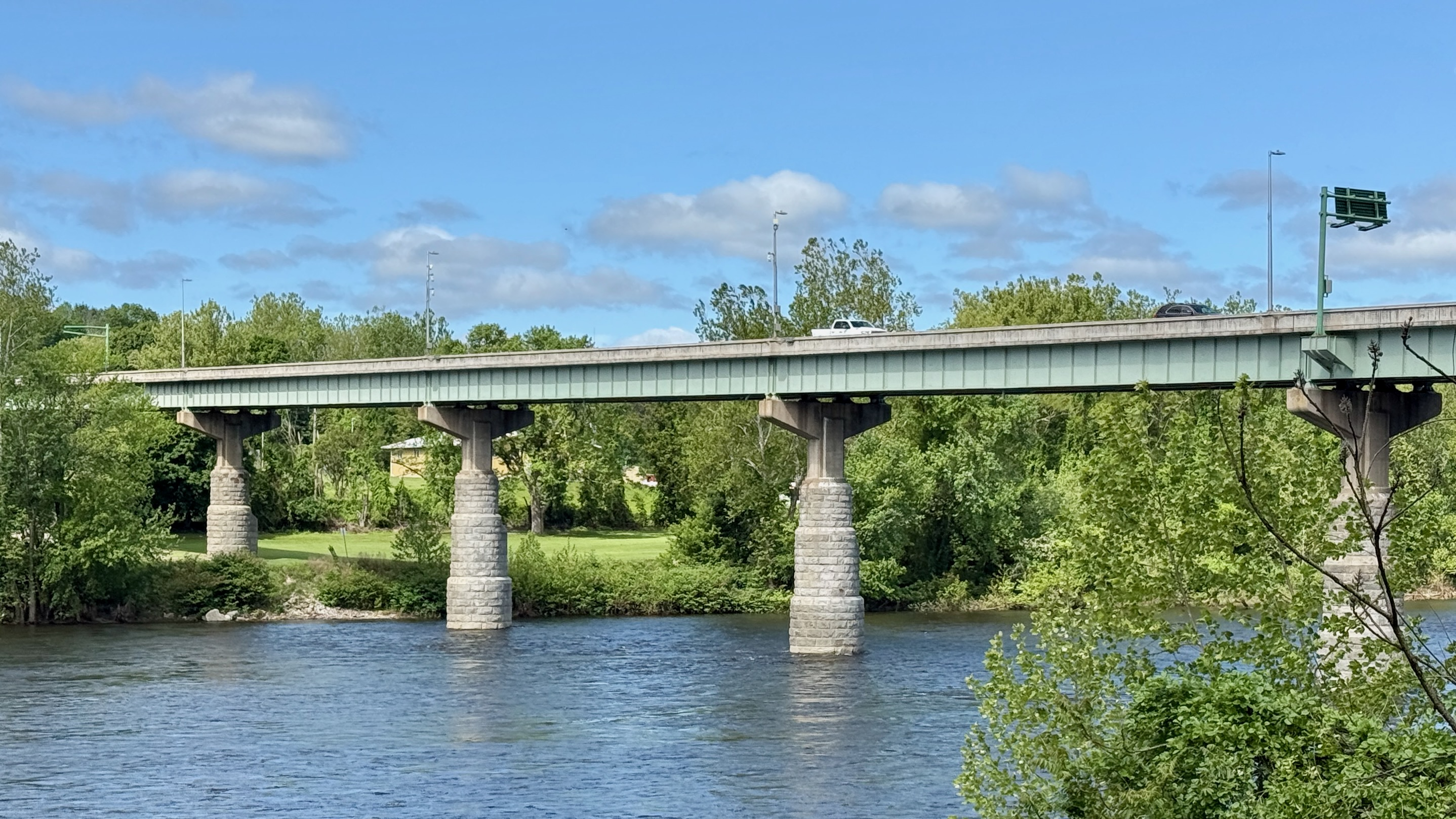
- Portland–Columbia Toll Bridge in May 2025
- Coordinates: 40.9216°N 75.0917°W
- Carries: 2 lanes of Route 94
- Crosses: Delaware River
- Locale: Portland, Pennsylvania and Columbia, New Jersey
- Official name: Portland–Columbia Toll Bridge
- Other name(s): Portland–Columbia Bridge; Portland Toll Bridge; Portland Bridge
- Maintained by: Delaware River Joint Toll Bridge Commission

Characteristics
- Design: Ten-span steel girder
- Total length: 1,309 ft (399 m)
- Width: 32 ft (9.8 m)

History
- Opened: December 1, 1953

Statistics
- Toll: Westbound: $5.00 for cars without E-ZPass $2.00 for cars with E-ZPass

Location
- Interactive map of Portland–Columbia Toll Bridge

The Portland–Columbia Toll Bridge is a toll bridge over the Delaware River between Pennsylvania Route 611 at Portland, Pennsylvania, and U.S. Route 46 in the Columbia section of Knowlton Township, New Jersey, United States. It is owned and operated by the Delaware River Joint Toll Bridge Commission.

New Jersey Route 94 begins on the Pennsylvania-New Jersey State Line over the river, and continues into New Jersey, though it is not signed as that route until after leaving the bridge.

== History and architectural features ==
The bridge opened for public use on December 1, 1953. The main span is a 1,309-foot (399 m) long, ten-span steel girder system, supported by reinforced concrete piers and concrete bin abutments.

The bridge is 32 feet (9.8 m) wide from curb to curb. There is no sidewalk on the bridge. The Portland–Columbia Pedestrian Bridge is located 1,000 feet (300 m) upstream of the Portland–Columbia Toll Bridge.

A three-lane toll plaza is located on the Pennsylvania side of the bridge, serving westbound traffic only. The pay-by-plate toll for automobiles is $5.00, while E-ZPass users pay $2.00.

The Delaware Water Gap Toll Bridge, Portland–Columbia Toll Bridge and the Milford–Montague Toll Bridge were all constructed simultaneously by the Delaware River Joint Toll Bridge Commission, with work on all three started on October 15, 1951 and all three bridge openings spaced approximately every two weeks in December 1953.

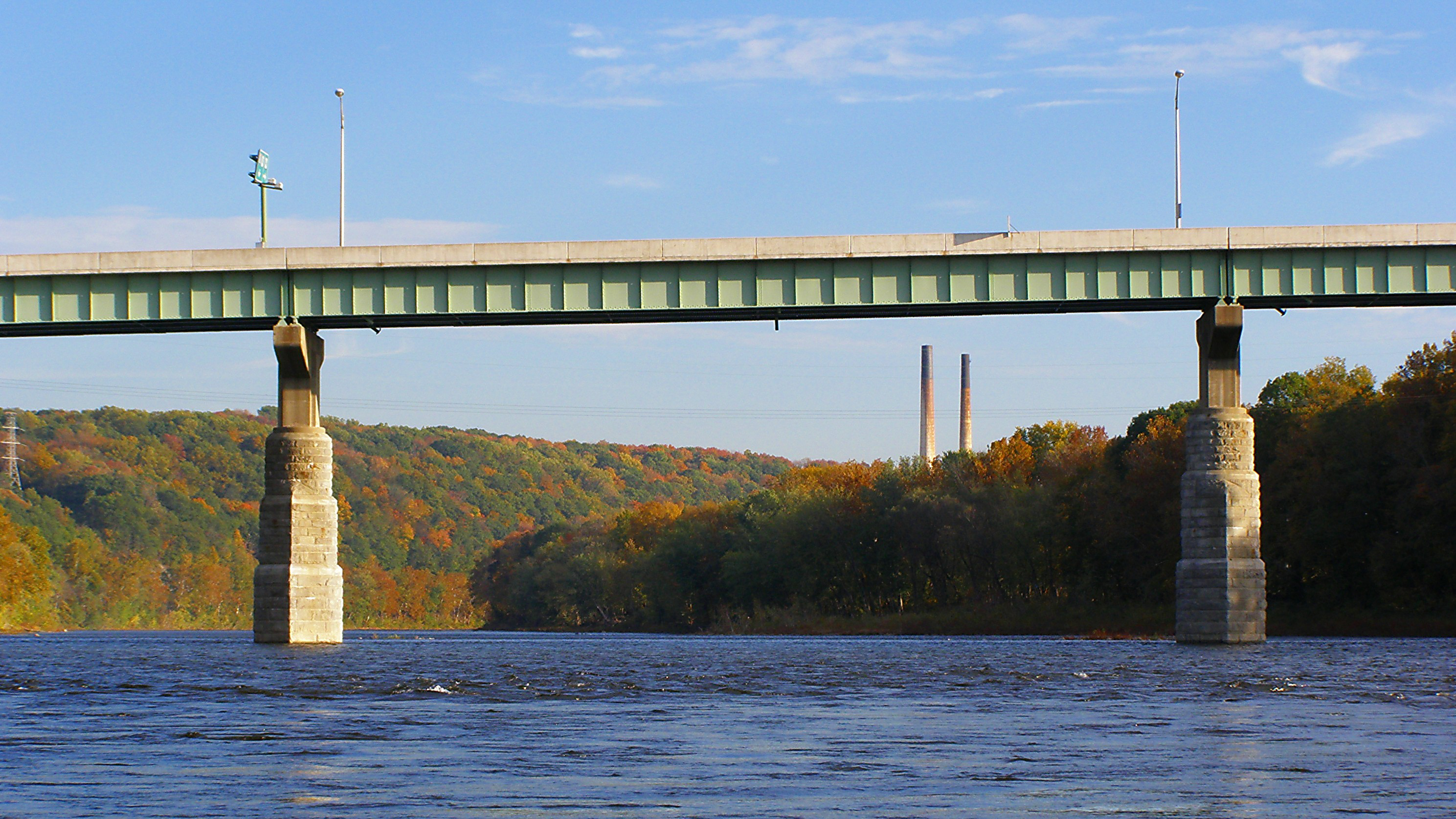
View looking south from the river
