= A. Elizabeth Adams =

American zoologist

Amy Elizabeth Adams
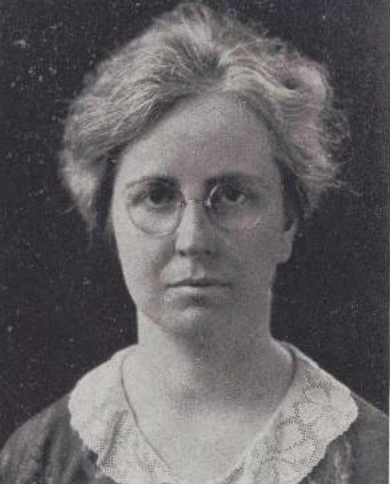
- Amy Elizabeth Adams, from the 1925 yearbook of Mount Holyoke College
- Born: 28 March 1892
- Died: 15 February 1962 (aged 69)
- Education: Blair Academy; Mount Holyoke College (B.A.); Columbia University (M.A.); Yale University (Ph.D.)
- Scientific career
- Fields: Zoology
- Workplaces: Mount Holyoke College
- Thesis: An experimental study of the development of the mouth in the amphibian embryo

Amy Elizabeth Adams (March 28, 1892 – February 15, 1962) was an American zoologist and professor at Mount Holyoke College. She also was among the first to teach college courses in experimental zoology and embryology, which were introduced in 1923.

== Early life and education ==
Born in the Delaware section of Knowlton Township, New Jersey, Adams studied biology at Mount Holyoke, where she earned her bachelor's degree in zoology in 1914. She worked and lived with Ann Haven Morgan where they held Zoology meeting at their house. She worked as a laboratory aide after graduation, and continued her studies in zoology. She later earned a master's degree from Columbia University in 1918 and a Ph.D. from Yale University in 1923. The title of her thesis, first printed in 1924 in the Journal of Experimental Zoology, was 'An experimental study of the development of the mouth in the amphibian embryo.' Additionally Adams conducted research experiments on mice to find the reactions of endocrine glands in frogs. Adams also studied for a year from 1930 to 1931 at the University of Edinburgh.

== Career ==
In 1914, Adams began her career at Mount Holyoke College, where she worked as a Laboratory Assistant in the Zoology Department until 1915. She left to earn her MA from Columbia in 1918 and her PhD from Yale in 1923. In 1919 she returned to the college where she taught zoology until her retirement in 1957. Adams was the acting head of the Zoology Department at Mount Holyoke College in 1920-21, 1929, and 1937. She also served as acting dean of the college during the first semester of 1926-27.

Adams taught and researched embryology, endocrinology, and experimental zoology, especially focusing on endocrinology of the reproductive system. This was extremely important and impressive considering both of these were new fields at this point in her career. While at Mount Holyoke, she was teaching embryology and experimental zoology. Both of which she was the first to introduce at any college in 1923. Her studies of the reproductive system were among the first. She also experimented with various hormones and glands and their effects on the human body. Throughout her life, she authored about 50 articles in notebooks dedicated to research. Adams was funded by a variety of organizations, a rarity for women and women's colleges, throughout her career. She maintained her funding during the Great Depression, another rare accomplishment. Adams died in 1962 in South Hadley, Massachusetts.

== Works ==
- 'An experimental study of the development of the mouth in the amphibian embryo', Journal of Experimental Zoology, 40, 1924 doi:10.1002/jez.1400400302
- 'Studies on life in Triturus viridescens : the effects of ovarian grafts in castrated males', Journal of Experimental Zoology, 55 (January 1930) doi:10.1002/jez.1400550107
- 'The endocrine glands and molting in Triturus viridescens', Journal of Experimental Zoology, 63:1 (August 1932) doi:10.1002/jez.1400630102
- 'The gonad- and thyroid- stimulating potencies of phyone and hebin', Anatomical Record 59:3 (June 1934) doi:10.1002/ar.1090590308
- Studies in experimental zoology (regeneration, experimental embryology, endocrinology), 1936 OCLC 223213365
- (with Beatrice Gray) 'A comparative study of the thyroid glands of hypophysectomized newts after treatment with anterior pituitary, thyroid and iodine', Anatomical Record 65:1 (June 1936)April 1936) doi:10.1002/ar.1090650108
- (with Florence Martindale) 'The response of thyroid glands of hypophysectomized newts to injections of phyone and their reaction after cessation of treatment', Anatomical Record 65:3 (June 1936) doi:10.1002/ar.1090650306
- (with Barbara Granger and Ruth Rhoades) 'Stimulation of the thyroid gland of the guinea pig by anuran anterior pituitary', Anatomical Record 72:4 & supplement (December 1938) doi:10.1002/ar.1090720410
- (with Elizabeth M. DeForest and Barbara Granger) 'Effects of administering mouse anterior pituitary to the newt and the frog', Proceedings of the Society for Experimental Biology and Medicine 42 (1939) doi:10.3181/00379727-42-10904
- 'Sexual conditions in triturus viridescens. III, The reproductive cycle of the adult aquatic form of both sexes', American Journal of Anatomy, 66:2 (March 1940) doi:10.1002/aja.1000660205

== Professional memberships ==
- Elected Fellow, New York Academy of Sciences
- Member, Endocrine Society
- Member, Society for Experimental Biology and Medicine
