= Milford–Montague Toll Bridge =

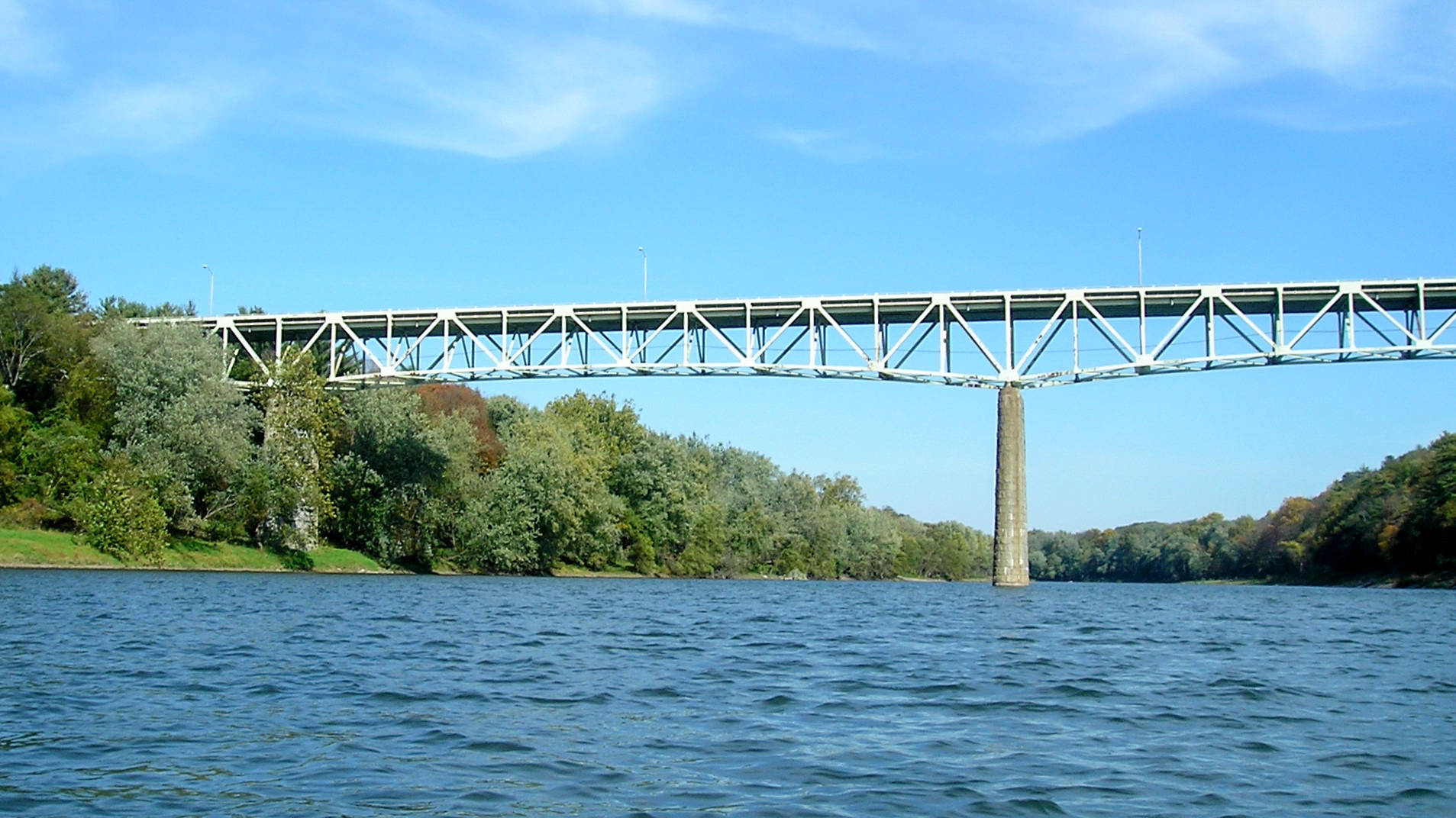
- Coordinates: 41°18′26″N 74°48′01″W
- Carries: 2 lanes of US 206
- Crosses: Delaware River
- Locale: Dingman Township, Pennsylvania and Montague Township, New Jersey
- Official name: Milford–Montague Toll Bridge
- Other name(s): Milford-Montague Bridge; US 206 Toll Bridge

Characteristics
- Design: Steel deck truss bridge
- Total length: 1,150 ft

History
- Opened: December 30, 1953

Statistics
- Toll: Northbound: $5.00 for cars without E-ZPass $2.00 for cars with E-ZPass

Location
- Interactive map of Milford–Montague Toll Bridge

The Milford–Montague Toll Bridge (also known as the US 206 Toll Bridge) is a truss bridge that crosses the Delaware River, connecting Montague Township, New Jersey to Dingman Township, Pennsylvania on U.S. Route 206, near the town of Milford. The two-lane bridge, which opened on December 30, 1953, has a total length of 1,150 feet (350 m), and is operated by the Delaware River Joint Toll Bridge Commission.

Tolls are collected only from motorists traveling northbound, into Pennsylvania.

== Bridge history ==
The bridge was approved in 1951, to replace an existing crossing at the site that dated from 1889. The Delaware Water Gap Toll Bridge, the Portland–Columbia Toll Bridge and the Milford–Montague Toll Bridge were all constructed simultaneously by the Delaware River Joint Toll Bridge Commission, with work on all three started on October 15, 1951, and all three bridge openings spaced approximately every two weeks in December 1953.

== Toll information ==
Vehicle

- Automobile
- 2-Axle Truck
- 3-Axle Truck
- 4-Axle Truck
- 5-Axle Truck
- 6-Axle Truck
- 7-Axle Truck

Pay-by-Plate toll

- $3.00
- $10.00
- $15.00
- $20.00
- $25.00
- $30.00
- $35.00

E-ZPass toll

- $1.50
- $9.00
- $13.50
- $18.00
- $22.50
- $27.00
- $31.50

== See also ==
- List of crossings of the Delaware River
