= Portland–Columbia Pedestrian Bridge =

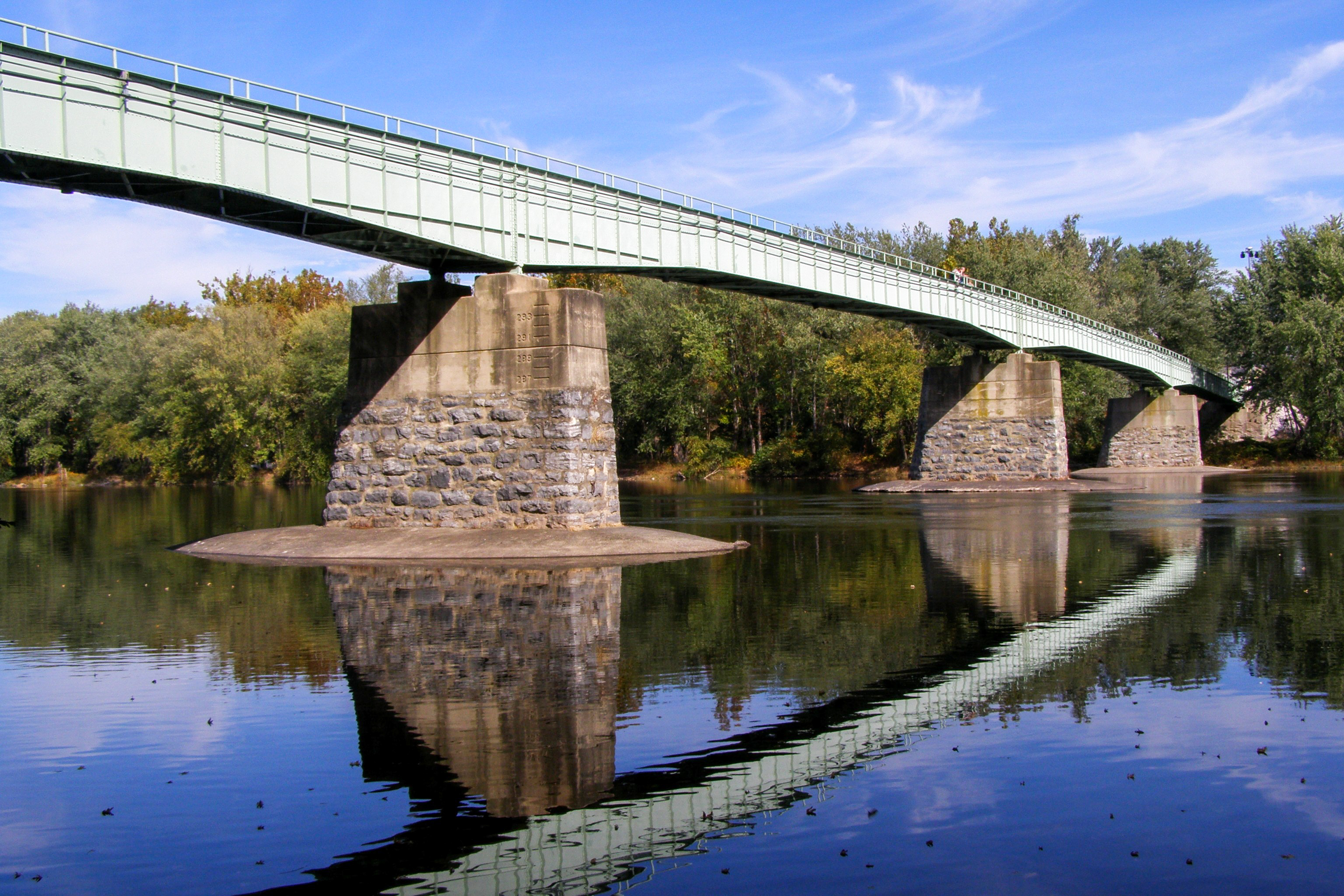
- Coordinates: 40°55′27″N 75°05′44″W
- Crosses: Delaware River
- Locale: Portland, Pennsylvania, Columbia, New Jersey

Characteristics
- Design: Truss bridge

History
- Opened: October 22, 1958

The Portland–Columbia Pedestrian Bridge (formally known as the Portland-Columbia Toll Supported Pedestrian Bridge) is a footbridge that crosses the Delaware River, at Portland, Pennsylvania, connecting to Columbia, in Knowlton Township, New Jersey, United States. The bridge is owned and operated by the Delaware River Joint Toll Bridge Commission.

== History ==
A vehicular bridge had been located at the site of the present bridge since 1869. The original structure was a four-span timber bridge with wooden arches which was covered by a wooden shed with a slate roof. It was a private toll bridge until 1927.

As of December 1, 1953, the bridge on the site was closed to vehicular traffic, which was shifted to the new Portland-Columbia Toll Bridge, built one-quarter mile downstream of the old bridge.

In August 1955, during the remnants of Hurricane Diane, three of the four spans of the timber bridge washed away. Hurricane Diane was the wettest hurricane to ever hit the North American continent and caused record flooding throughout the northeastern US, but particularly the Delaware River watershed.

This plaque was placed on the Portland side of the bridge to commemorate the covered bridge destroyed by the remnants of Hurricane Diane in August 1955.

Starting in 1957, the bridge was reconstructed as a four-span steel girder bridge system with concrete piers. In 1996, new guide rails were added and an ADA-compliant access ramp was built on the New Jersey side.
