= Knowlton Township, New Jersey =

Township in Warren County, New Jersey, US

- Township
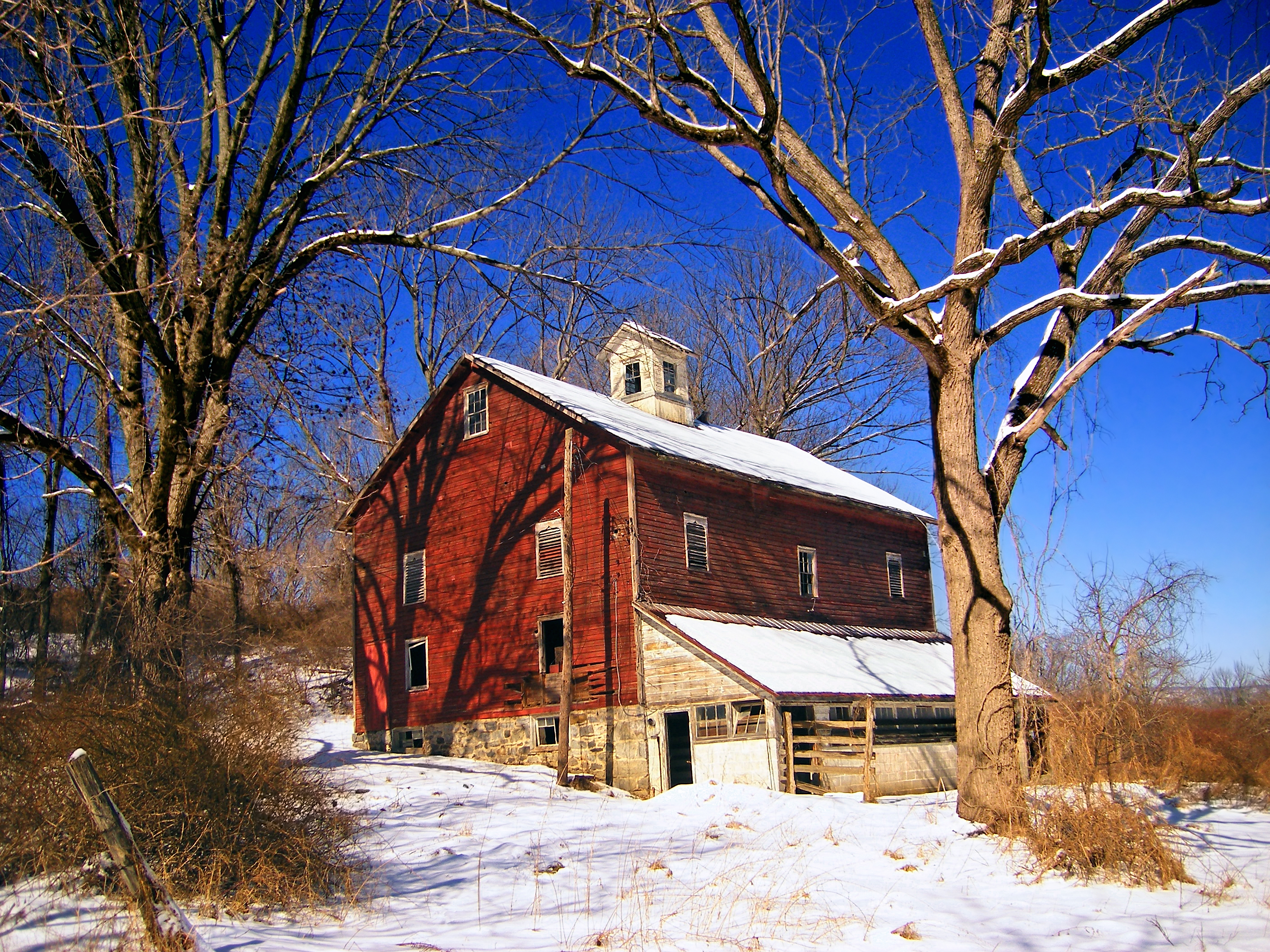
- An old barn in Knowlton Township, February 2008

- Seal

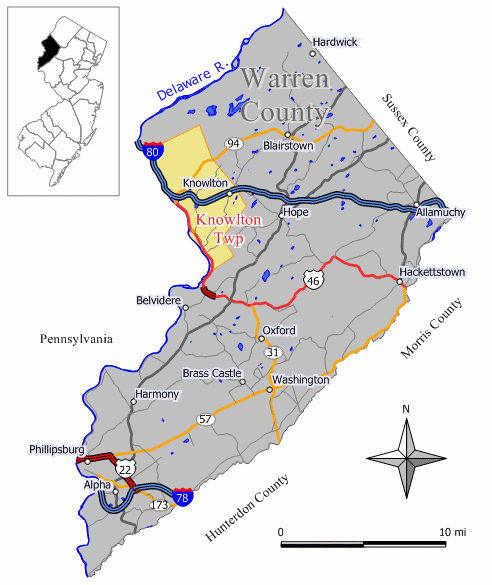
- Location of Knowlton Township in Warren County highlighted in yellow (right). Inset map: Location of Warren County in New Jersey highlighted in black (left).

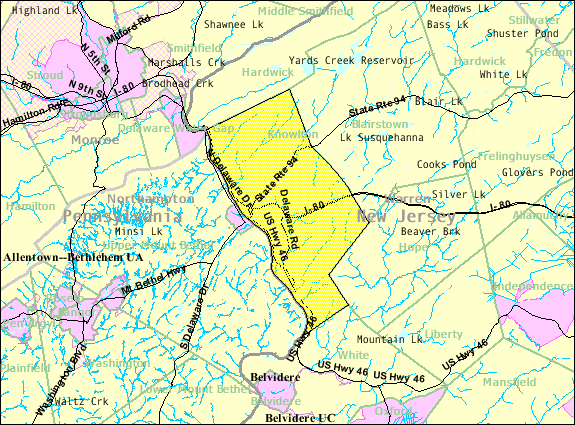
- Census Bureau map of Knowlton Township, New Jersey

- Location in Warren County Location in New Jersey Location in the United States
- Coordinates: 40.929261°N 75.061796°W
- Country: United States
- State: New Jersey
- County: Warren
- Royal charter: February 23, 1763
- Incorporated: February 21, 1798
- Named for: Thomas Knowlton or "knoll town"

Government
  - Type: Township
  - Body: Township Committee
  - Mayor: Frank VanHorn (R, term ends December 31, 2023)
  - Municipal clerk: Kailene Molion (acting)

Area
  - Total: 25.33 sq mi (65.60 km^{2})
  - Land: 24.72 sq mi (64.03 km^{2})
  - Water: 0.60 sq mi (1.56 km^{2}) 2.38%
  - Rank: 106th of 565 in state 5th of 22 in county
- Elevation: 528 ft (161 m)

Population (2020)
  - Total: 2,894
  - Estimate (2023): 2,926
  - Rank: 453rd of 565 in state 14th of 22 in county
  - Density: 117.1/sq mi (45.2/km^{2})
  - Rank: 533rd of 565 in state 18th of 22 in county
- Time zone: UTC−05:00 (Eastern (EST))
  - Summer (DST): UTC−04:00 (Eastern (EDT))
- ZIP Codes: 07825 – Blairstown; 07832 – Columbia; 07833 – Delaware
- Area code: 908
- FIPS code: 3404137320
- GNIS feature ID: 0882241
- Website: knowlton-nj.com

Knowlton Township is a township in Warren County, in the U.S. state of New Jersey. As of the 2020 United States census, the township's population was 2,894, a decrease of 161 (−5.3%) from the 2010 census count of 3,055, which in turn reflected an increase of 78 (+2.6%) from the 2,977 counted in the 2000 census.

== History ==
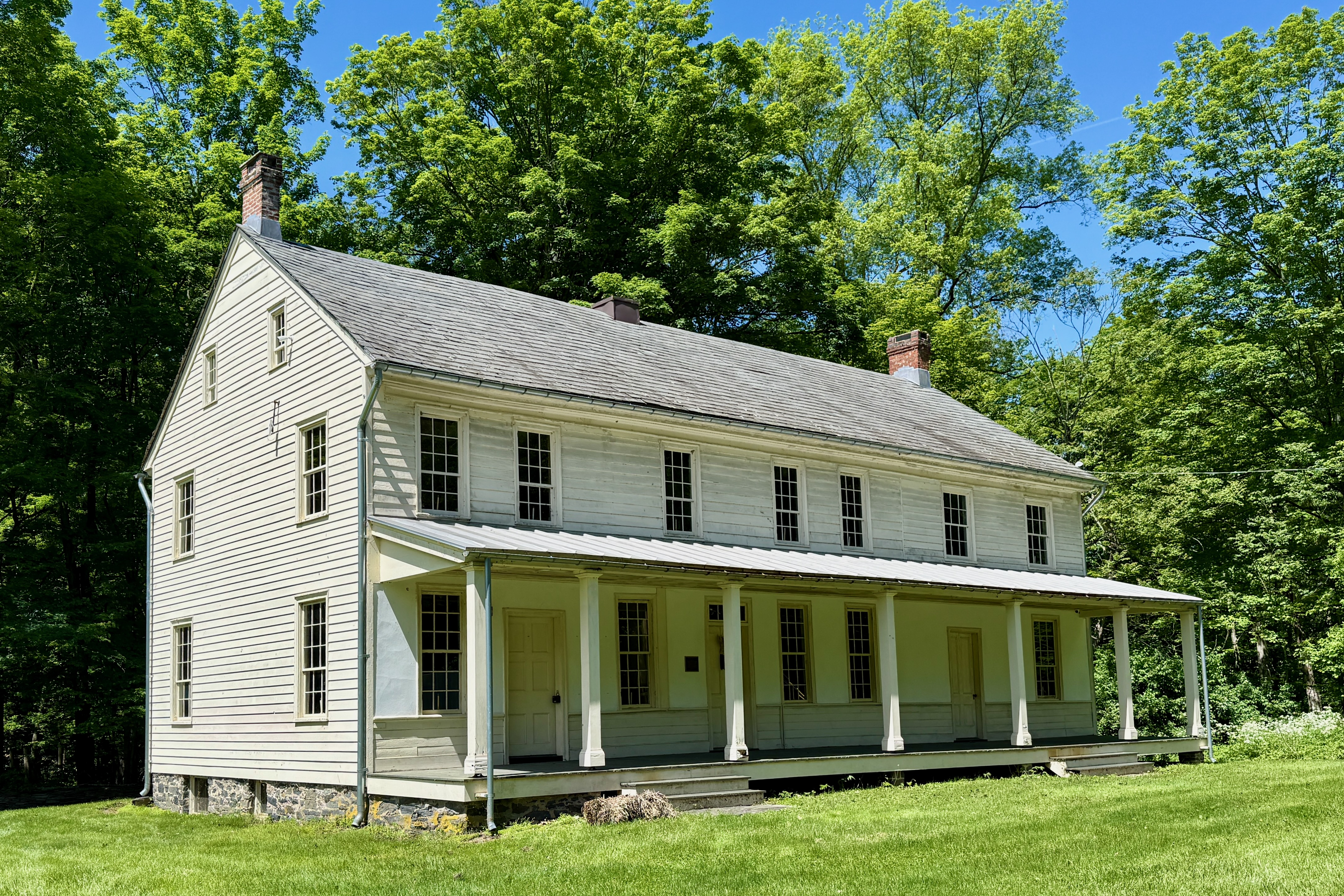
Ramsaysburg Homestead, listed on the National Register of Historic Places

Knowlton Township was created as a precinct by Royal charter from portions of Oxford Township on February 23, 1763, while the area was still part of Sussex County, and was incorporated as a township by an act of the New Jersey Legislature on February 21, 1798, and then became part of the newly created Warren County on November 20, 1824. Portions of the township were taken to form Hope Township (April 8, 1839) and Blairstown Township (April 14, 1845).

Knowlton's name is variously attributed to Thomas Knowlton, a Colonel in the Continental Army during the American Revolutionary War who was killed in action at the Battle of Harlem Heights, or to the knolls that characterize the area. In some older sources, the name is spelled "Knawltown".

The township is served by postal ZIP Codes in Columbia (07832) and Delaware (07833), although a small number of Knowlton residents receive postal deliveries via the Blairstown (07825) post office. Within the township are several small hamlets, including Browning, Deckers Ferry, Mount Pleasant, Polkville, Ramseyburg, Warrington and Knowlton itself.

== Geography ==
According to the United States Census Bureau, the township had a total area of 25.33 square miles (65.60 km^{2}), including 24.72 square miles (64.03 km^{2}) of land and 0.60 square miles (1.56 km^{2}) of water (2.38%). The township is located in the Kittatinny Valley which is a section of the Great Appalachian Valley that stretches 700 miles (1,100 km) from Canada to Alabama.

Columbia (with a 2020 Census population of 215), Delaware (173) and Hainesburg (422) are unincorporated communities and census-designated places (CDPs) located within the township.

Other unincorporated communities, localities and place names located partially or completely within the township include Browning, Deckers Ferry, Mount Pleasant, Polkville, Ramseyburg and Warrington.

The township borders the Warren County municipalities of Blairstown Township, Hardwick Township, Hope Township and White Township.

== Demographics ==
Historical population
Census	Pop.	Note	%±
1810	2,064		—
1820	2,701		30.9%
1830	2,827		4.7%
1840	2,310	*	−18.3%
1850	1,356	*	−41.3%
1860	1,557		14.8%
1870	1,691		8.6%
1880	1,476		−12.7%
1890	1,411		−4.4%
1900	1,210		−14.2%
1910	1,556		28.6%
1920	1,073		−31.0%
1930	1,049		−2.2%
1940	1,084		3.3%
1950	1,260		16.2%
1960	1,442		14.4%
1970	1,738		20.5%
1980	2,074		19.3%
1990	2,543		22.6%
2000	2,977		17.1%
2010	3,055		2.6%
2020	2,894		−5.3%
2023 (est.)	2,926		1.1%
Population sources: 1810–1920 1840 1850–1870; 1850 1870 1880–1890; 1890–1910 1910–1930; 1940–2000 2000; 2010 2020 * = Lost territory in previous decade

The Township's economic data (as is all of Warren County) is calculated by the US Census Bureau as part of the Allentown-Bethlehem-Easton, PA-NJ Metropolitan Statistical Area.

=== 2010 census ===
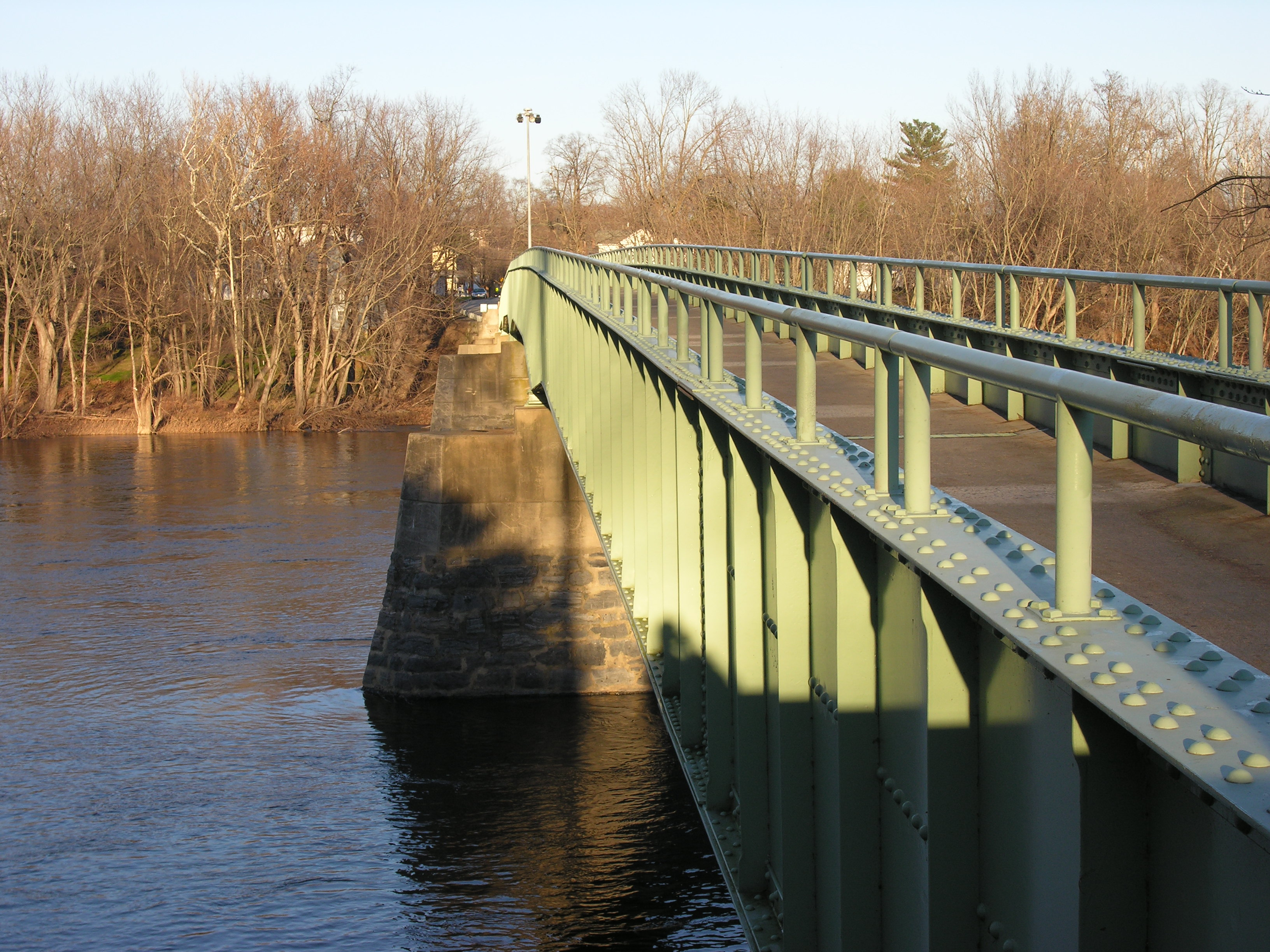
The Portland-Columbia Pedestrian Bridge replaced the last of the covered bridges spanning the Delaware River in this photo facing towards New Jersey. The original covered bridge was destroyed by the remnants of Hurricane Diane on August 19, 1955, a storm that caused record flooding throughout the region, but particularly within the watershed of the Delaware.

The 2010 United States census counted 3,055 people, 1,097 households, and 864 families in the township. The population density was 123.4 inhabitants per square mile (47.6/km^{2}). There were 1,212 housing units at an average density of 49.0 per square mile (18.9/km^{2}). The racial makeup was 96.07% (2,935) White, 0.92% (28) Black or African American, 0.29% (9) Native American, 0.92% (28) Asian, 0.00% (0) Pacific Islander, 0.75% (23) from other races, and 1.05% (32) from two or more races. Hispanic or Latino of any race were 3.63% (111) of the population.

Of the 1,097 households, 33.5% had children under the age of 18; 66.5% were married couples living together; 8.3% had a female householder with no husband present and 21.2% were non-families. Of all households, 16.3% were made up of individuals and 6.7% had someone living alone who was 65 years of age or older. The average household size was 2.75 and the average family size was 3.10.

23.3% of the population were under the age of 18, 7.0% from 18 to 24, 20.2% from 25 to 44, 36.8% from 45 to 64, and 12.7% who were 65 years of age or older. The median age was 44.8 years. For every 100 females, the population had 101.7 males. For every 100 females ages 18 and older there were 98.1 males.

The Census Bureau's 2006–2010 American Community Survey showed that (in 2010 inflation-adjusted dollars) median household income was $81,346 (with a margin of error of +/− $11,792) and the median family income was $86,708 (+/− $13,339). Males had a median income of $76,733 (+/− $8,158) versus $51,757 (+/− $3,961) for females. The per capita income for the Township was $35,440 (+/− $4,605). About 1.4% of families and 3.3% of the population were below the poverty line, including 3.1% of those under age 18 and 7.7% of those age 65 or over.

=== 2000 census ===
As of the 2000 U.S. census, there were 2,977 people, 1,028 households, and 816 families residing in the township. The population density was 120.1 inhabitants per square mile (46.4/km^{2}). There were 1,135 housing units at an average density of 45.8 per square mile (17.7/km^{2}). The racial makeup of the township was 97.45% White, 0.40% African American, 0.07% Native American, 0.64% Asian, 0.47% from other races, and 0.97% from two or more races. Hispanic or Latino of any race were 1.85% of the population.

There were 1,028 households, out of which 40.0% had children under the age of 18 living with them, 69.1% were married couples living together, 6.6% had a female householder with no husband present, and 20.6% were non-families. 15.0% of all households were made up of individuals, and 7.1% had someone living alone who was 65 years of age or older. The average household size was 2.87 and the average family size was 3.21.

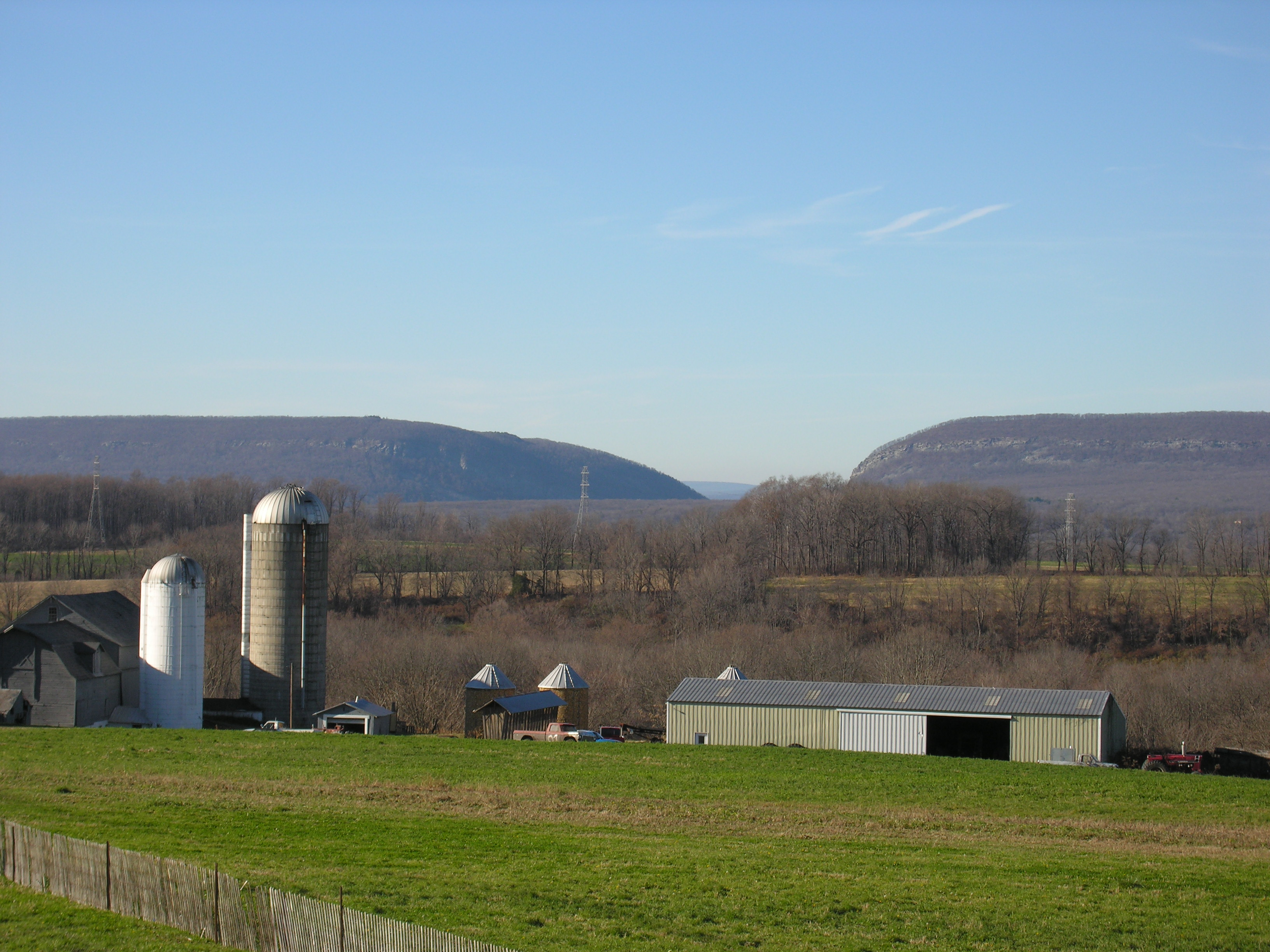
Knowlton Township's rural character is evident in this view of the Delaware Water Gap from Linaberry Road.

In the township the population was spread out, with 27.6% under the age of 18, 5.7% from 18 to 24, 31.3% from 25 to 44, 24.1% from 45 to 64, and 11.2% who were 65 years of age or older. The median age was 38 years. For every 100 females, there were 101.8 males. For every 100 females age 18 and over, there were 98.0 males.

The median income for a household in the township was $63,409, and the median income for a family was $72,130. Males had a median income of $46,250 versus $35,326 for females. The per capita income for the township was $24,631. About 1.5% of families and 3.5% of the population were below the poverty line, including 4.2% of those under age 18 and 1.3% of those age 65 or over.

== Government ==
=== Local government ===
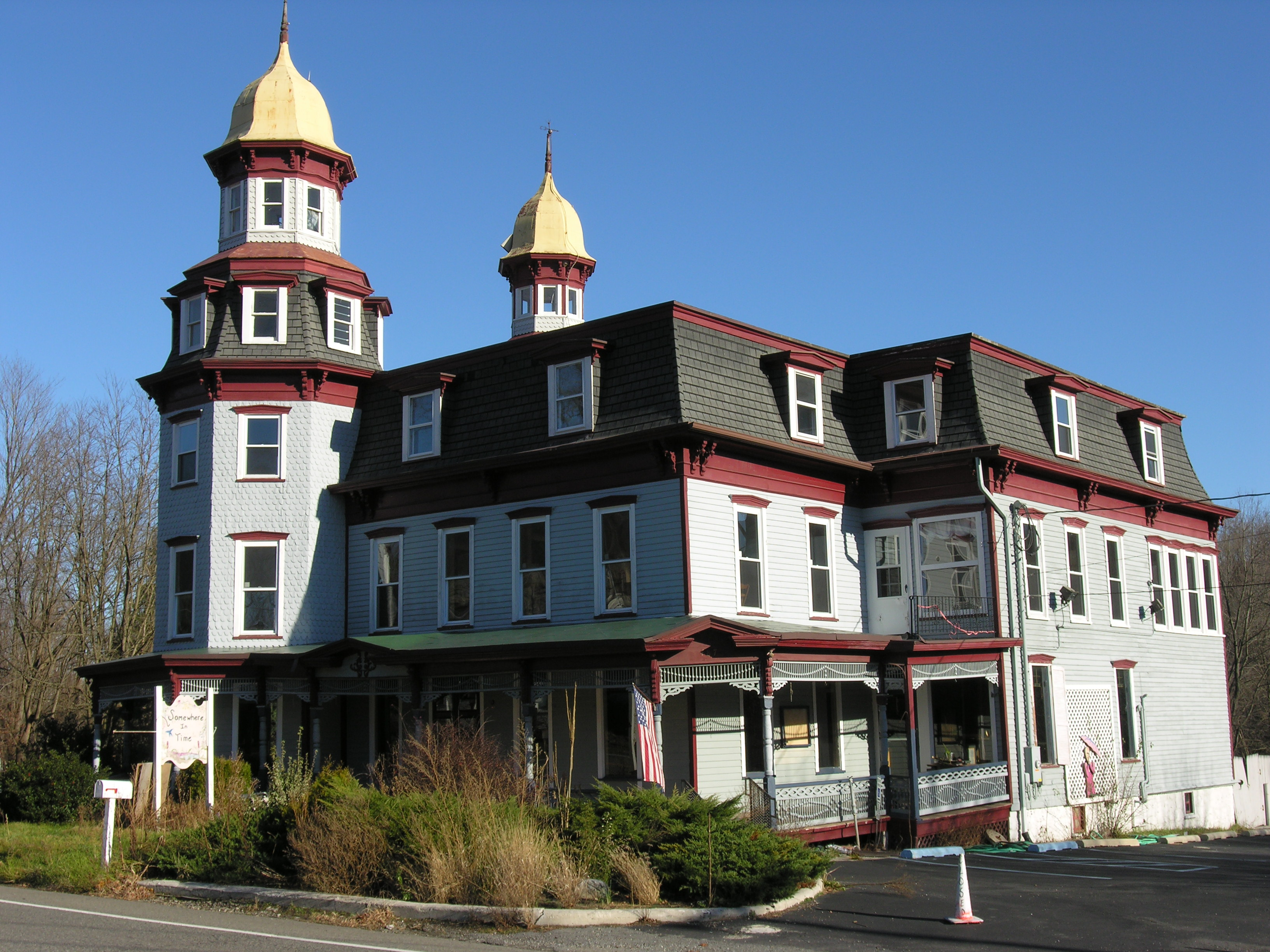
The former Hainesburg Inn (now Animal Mansion, a veterinary hospital) on Route 94 is considered by many to be the signature piece of architecture in Knowlton

Knowlton Township is governed under the Township form of New Jersey municipal government, one of 141 municipalities (of the 564) statewide that use this form, the second-most commonly used form of government in the state. The Township Committee is comprised of five members, who are elected directly by the voters at-large in partisan elections to serve three-year terms of office on a staggered basis, with either one or two seats coming up for election each year as part of the November general election in a three-year cycle. At an annual reorganization meeting, the Township Committee selects one of its members to serve as Mayor and another as Deputy Mayor.

As of 2022, the Knowlton Township Committee is comprised of Mayor M. Adele Starrs (R, term on committee and as mayor ends December 31, 2022), Deputy Mayor Debra L. Shipps (R, term on committee ends 2023; term as deputy mayor ends 2022), Kathy Cuntala (R, 2024), James Mazza (R, 2023), and Frank Van Horn (R, 2022).

=== Federal, state, and county representation ===
Knowlton Township is located in the 7th Congressional District and is part of New Jersey's 23rd state legislative district.

For the 119th United States Congress, New Jersey's 7th congressional district is represented by Thomas Kean Jr. (R, Westfield). New Jersey is represented in the United States Senate by Democrats Cory Booker (Newark, term ends 2027) and Andy Kim (Moorestown, term ends 2031).

For the 2026–2027 session, the 23rd legislative district of the New Jersey Legislature is represented in the State Senate by Doug Steinhardt (R, Lopatcong Township) and in the General Assembly by John DiMaio (R, Hackettstown) and Erik Peterson (R, Franklin Township).

Warren County is governed by a three-member Board of County Commissioners, who are chosen at-large on a staggered basis in partisan elections with one seat coming up for election each year as part of the November general election. At an annual reorganization meeting held in the beginning of January, the board selects one of its members to serve as Commissioner Director and other as Deputy Director. As of 2025, Warren County's Commissioners are:

Deputy Director Jason J. Sarnoski (R, Lopatcong Township; 2025), Lori Ciesla (R, Lopatcong Township; 2026), and Director James R. Kern III (R, Pohatcong Township; 2027).

Constitutional officers of Warren County are: Clerk Holly Mackey (R, Alpha; 2027), Sheriff James McDonald Sr. (R, Phillipsburg; 2025) and Surrogate Michael J. Doherty (R, Washington; 2025).

=== Politics ===
As of March 2011, there were a total of 2,008 registered voters in Knowlton Township, of which 418 (20.8% vs. 21.5% countywide) were registered as Democrats, 694 (34.6% vs. 35.3%) were registered as Republicans and 895 (44.6% vs. 43.1%) were registered as Unaffiliated. There as one voter registered to another party. Among the township's 2010 Census population, 65.7% (vs. 62.3% in Warren County) were registered to vote, including 85.7% of those ages 18 and over (vs. 81.5% countywide).

Gubernatorial election results for Knowlton Township
Year	Republican		Democratic		Third party(ies)	
Year	No.	%	No.	%	No.	%
2025	859	63.96%	473	35.22%	11	0.82%
2021	465	69.30%	202	30.10%	4	0.60%
2017	525	64.89%	261	32.26%	23	2.84%
2013	671	74.64%	205	22.80%	23	2.56%
2009	595	65.17%	203	22.23%	115	12.60%
2005	534	63.20%	268	31.72%	43	5.09%

In the 2012 presidential election, Republican Mitt Romney received 833 votes (63.1% vs. 56.0% countywide), ahead of Democrat Barack Obama with 441 votes (33.4% vs. 40.8%) and other candidates with 19 votes (1.4% vs. 1.7%), among the 1,320 ballots cast by the township's 2,027 registered voters, for a turnout of 65.1% (vs. 66.7% in Warren County). In the 2008 presidential election, Republican John McCain received 918 votes (63.0% vs. 55.2% countywide), ahead of Democrat Barack Obama with 491 votes (33.7% vs. 41.4%) and other candidates with 25 votes (1.7% vs. 1.6%), among the 1,457 ballots cast by the township's 2,045 registered voters, for a turnout of 71.2% (vs. 73.4% in Warren County). In the 2004 presidential election, Republican George W. Bush received 948 votes (65.8% vs. 61.0% countywide), ahead of Democrat John Kerry with 469 votes (32.5% vs. 37.2%) and other candidates with 17 votes (1.2% vs. 1.3%), among the 1,441 ballots cast by the township's 1,899 registered voters, for a turnout of 75.9% (vs. 76.3% in the whole county).

United States presidential election results for Knowlton Township
Year	Republican		Democratic		Third party(ies)	
Year	No.	%	No.	%	No.	%
2024	1,171	67.26%	545	31.30%	25	1.44%
2020	1,190	66.04%	574	31.85%	38	2.11%
2016	944	68.01%	389	28.03%	55	3.96%
2012	833	64.42%	441	34.11%	19	1.47%
2008	918	64.02%	491	34.24%	25	1.74%
2004	948	66.11%	469	32.71%	17	1.19%

In the 2013 gubernatorial election, Republican Chris Christie received 74.6% of the vote (671 cast), ahead of Democrat Barbara Buono with 22.8% (205 votes), and other candidates with 2.6% (23 votes), among the 915 ballots cast by the township's 2,040 registered voters (16 ballots were spoiled), for a turnout of 44.9%. In the 2009 gubernatorial election, Republican Chris Christie received 595 votes (63.8% vs. 61.3% countywide), ahead of Democrat Jon Corzine with 203 votes (21.8% vs. 25.7%), Independent Chris Daggett with 102 votes (10.9% vs. 9.8%) and other candidates with 13 votes (1.4% vs. 1.5%), among the 932 ballots cast by the township's 1,987 registered voters, yielding a 46.9% turnout (vs. 49.6% in the county).

United States Senate election results for Knowlton Township1
Year	Republican		Democratic		Third party(ies)	
Year	No.	%	No.	%	No.	%
2024	1,120	65.88%	536	31.53%	44	2.59%
2018	785	67.09%	340	29.06%	45	3.85%
2012	799	64.33%	426	34.30%	17	1.37%
2006	529	62.53%	273	32.27%	44	5.20%

United States Senate election results for Knowlton Township2
Year	Republican		Democratic		Third party(ies)	
Year	No.	%	No.	%	No.	%
2020	1,161	65.52%	562	31.72%	49	2.77%
2014	449	64.88%	221	31.94%	22	3.18%
2013	392	71.01%	157	28.44%	3	0.54%
2008	897	66.05%	439	32.33%	22	1.62%

== Education ==
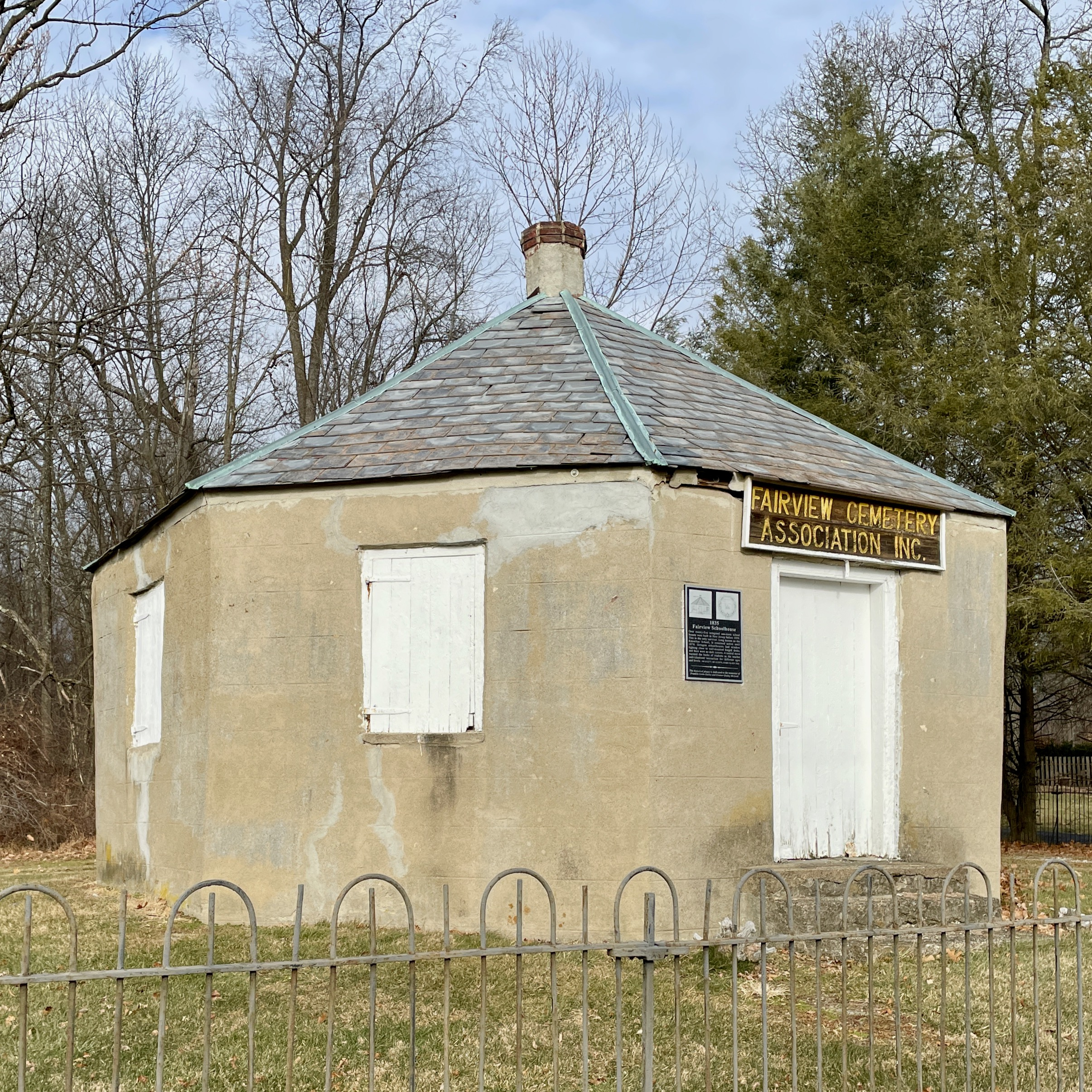
Fairview Schoolhouse, built in 1835 with an octagon shape

Children in pre-kindergarten through sixth grade for public school attend Knowlton Township Elementary School as part of the Knowlton Township School District. As of the 2019–20 school year, the district, comprised of one school, had an enrollment of 155 students and 23.0 classroom teachers (on an FTE basis), for a student–teacher ratio of 6.7:1. In the 2016–17 school year, Knowlton had the 41st smallest enrollment of any school district in the state, with 192 students.

Students in public school for seventh through twelfth grades attend the North Warren Regional High School in Blairstown, a public secondary high school, serving students from the townships of Blairstown, Frelinghuysen, Hardwick and Knowlton. As of the 2019–20 school year, the high school had an enrollment of 752 students and 69.0 classroom teachers (on an FTE basis), for a student–teacher ratio of 10.9:1. The seats on the district's nine-member board of education are allocated based on the population of the constituent municipalities, with two seats assigned to Knowlton Township.

Students from the township and from all of Warren County are eligible to attend Ridge and Valley Charter School in Frelinghuysen Township (for grades K–8, with Knowlton students among those given admission preference) or Warren County Technical School in Washington borough (for 9–12), with special education services provided by local districts supplemented throughout the county by the Warren County Special Services School District in Oxford Township (for PreK–12).

== Recreation ==
Tunnel Field is the primary recreational site in the township with several baseball and softball diamonds and soccer fields. Tunnel also has a play area (including swings and play area), a basketball court, tennis court, paved walking track, and concession stand. The field is located by Route 94 and is divided by the Lackawanna Cut-Off and is connected through an old tunnel (hence the name).

== Transportation ==
=== Roads and highways ===
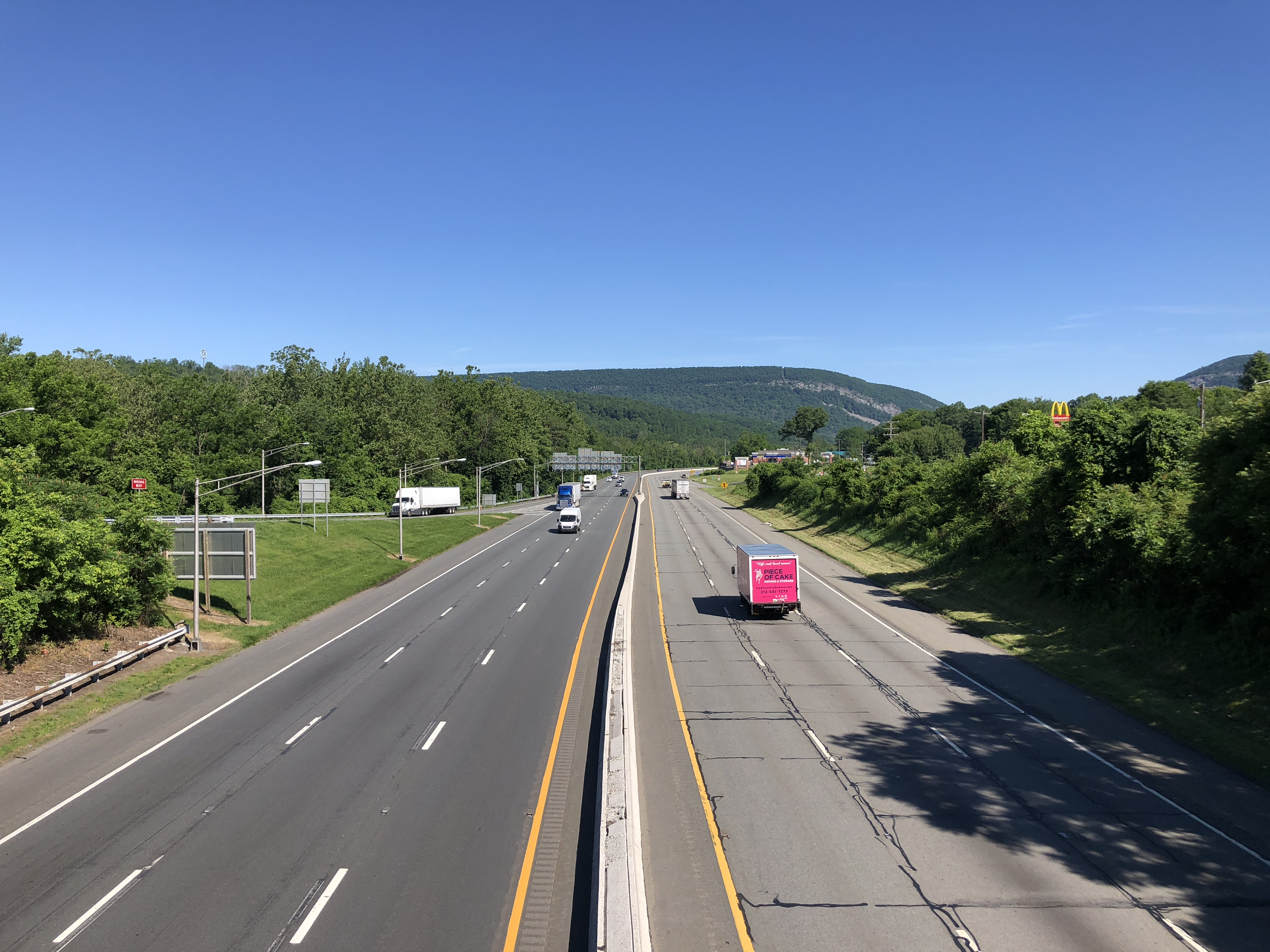
View west along Interstate 80 in Knowlton Township

As of May 2010, the township had a total of 67.96 miles (109.37 km) of roadways, of which 37.33 miles (60.08 km) were maintained by the municipality, 13.67 miles (22.00 km) by Warren County and 16.83 miles (27.09 km) by the New Jersey Department of Transportation and 0.13 miles (0.21 km) by the Delaware River Joint Toll Bridge Commission.

Interstate 80 (Bergen-Passaic Expressway) is the main east–west limited access road, passing through the township for 7.24 miles (11.65 km) with a junction at Routes 94 and 46. Route 94 passes through the northern portion of the township for 3.92 miles (6.31 km). U.S. Route 46 runs for 5.50 miles (8.85 km) through the township's southern portion. The Portland–Columbia Toll Bridge (part of Route 94), which is owned and operated by the Delaware River Joint Toll Bridge Commission, crosses the Delaware River and connects with Pennsylvania Route 611 in Portland, Pennsylvania.

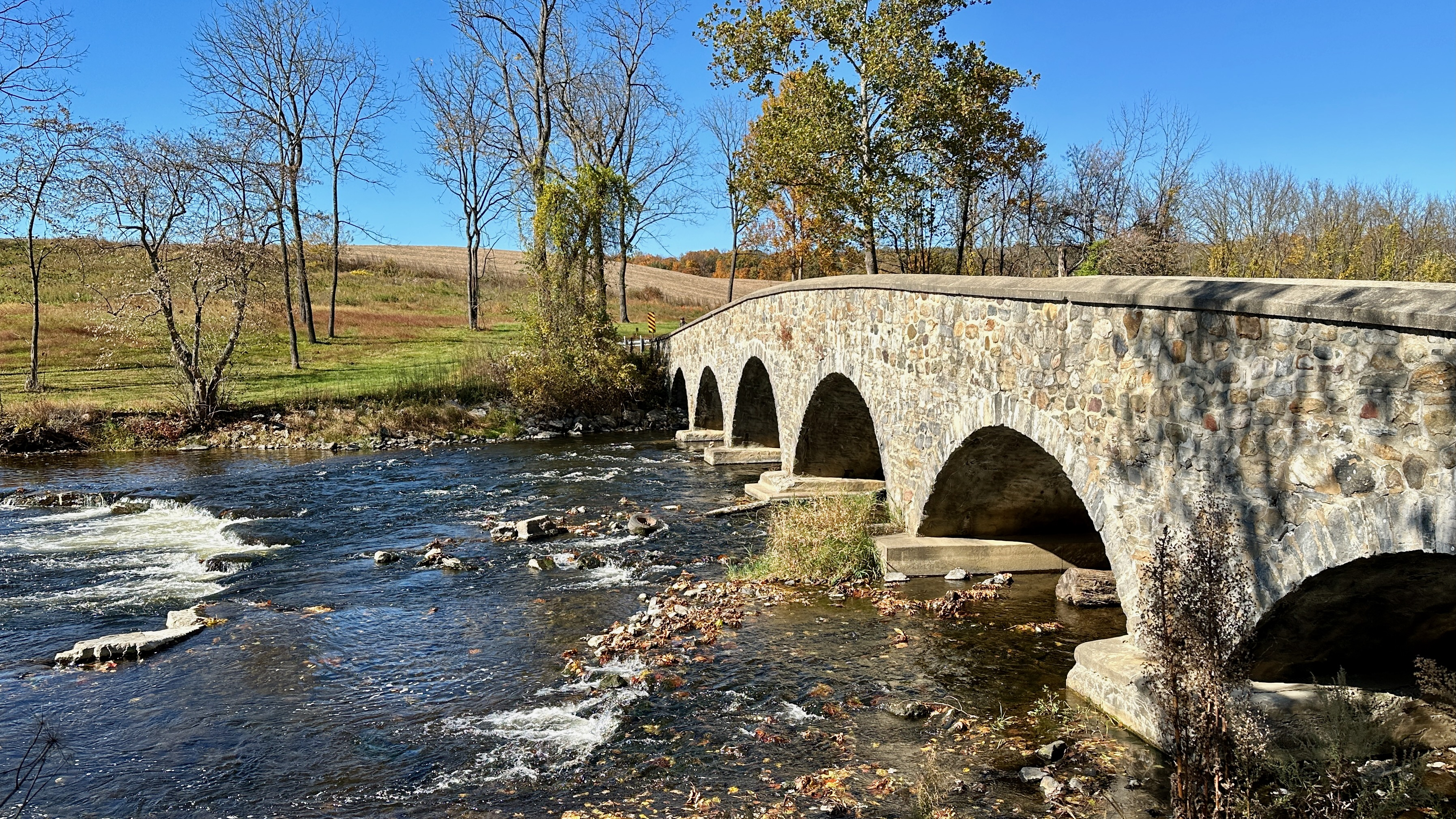
The Warrington Stone Bridge crosses the bucolic Paulins Kill.

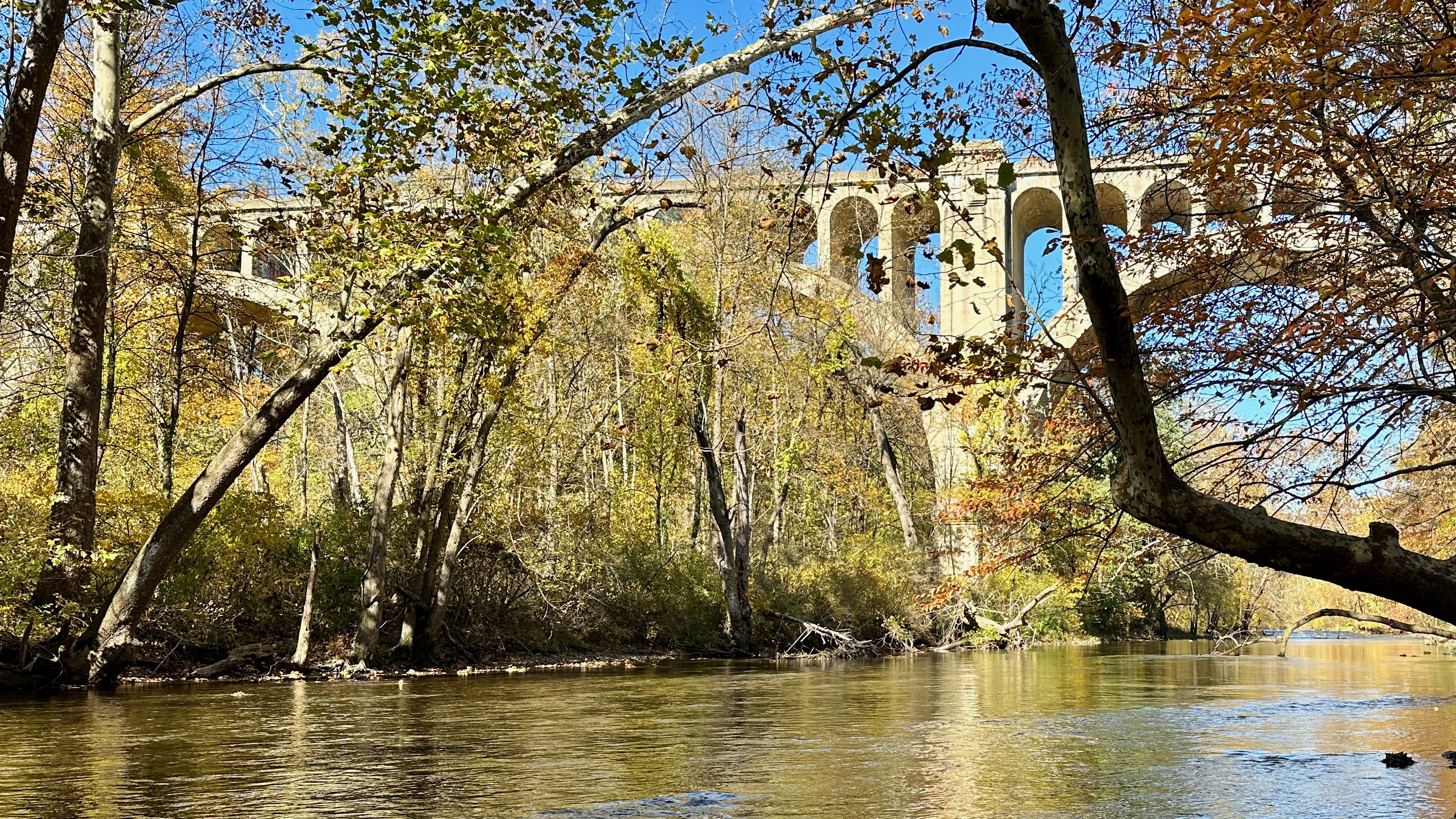
In the woods near Hainesburg is the Paulinskill Viaduct along the Lackawanna Cut-Off, the former main line of the Delaware, Lackawanna and Western Railroad. The viaduct, 115 feet (35 m) tall and 1,100 feet (335 m) long, was the largest reinforced concrete structure in the world when it was completed in 1910.

=== Rail history ===
Much of Knowlton's development after 1850 can be traced to the presence of the five railroad lines that criss-crossed the township: the Delaware, Lackawanna & Western Railroad's Old Road and, later, the Lackawanna Cut-Off, the New York, Susquehanna and Western Railway, the Lehigh and New England Railroad, and the Blairstown Railway. All of these rail lines were later abandoned. In their heyday, however, two rail lines and three railroads served the town of Delaware: the New York, Susquehanna and Western (formerly Blairstown) Railway; and the Old Road of the Delaware, Lackawanna and Western Railroad (which also had granted trackage rights to the Pennsylvania Railroad, technically a sixth railroad). The community of Columbia was also served by the NYS&W (Hainesburg also had a station), with the Lehigh and New England Railroad also passing through town.

In more recent years, development within Knowlton has been tied to the presence of U.S. Route 46 and, since the early 1970s, Interstate 80. Many Knowlton residents use Route 80 to commute to their jobs either further east in New Jersey or further west in Pennsylvania. Route 94 crosses through the township. Two bridges cross the Delaware River, connecting the township to Pennsylvania; the Portland–Columbia Toll Bridge, opened in 1953, connects Route 94 to Pennsylvania Route 611 in Portland, Pennsylvania. The two places are also connected by the Portland–Columbia Pedestrian Bridge, which dates back to a structure constructed in 1869 and was dedicated for pedestrian use when the vehicular toll bridge was completed in 1953.

== Points of interest ==
- Brook Hollow Winery
- DeVille's Historic Texaco

== Notable people ==
People who were born in, residents of, or otherwise closely associated with Knowlton Township include:

- A. Elizabeth Adams (1892–1962), zoologist and professor at Mount Holyoke College
- Charles H. Flummerfelt (1863–1931), politician who served in the Washington House of Representatives and Washington State Senate
- Cornelius Edward Gallagher (1921–2018), politician who represented New Jersey's 13th congressional district in the United States House of Representatives from 1959 to 1973
- Philip Johnson (1818–1867), represented Pennsylvania in the United States House of Representatives from 1861 to 1867
- Jonathan Sonne, competitive Magic: The Gathering player
- William Henry Witte (1817–1876), member of the U.S. House of Representatives from Pennsylvania, serving from 1853 to 1855
