= Delaware Water Gap Toll Bridge =

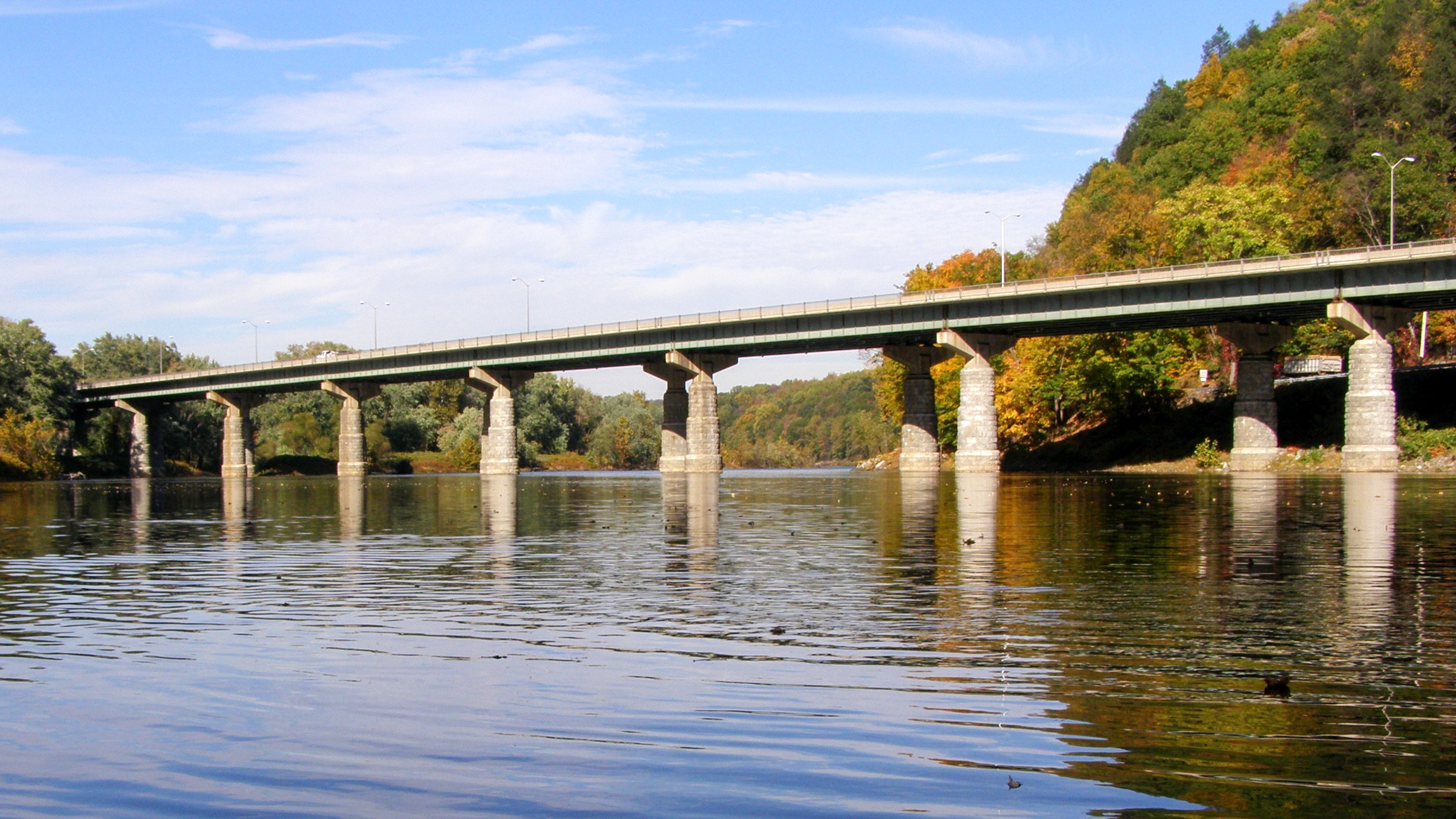
- Coordinates: 40°58′37″N 75°08′06″W
- Carries: 4 lanes of I-80 and the Appalachian Trail
- Crosses: Delaware River
- Locale: Delaware Water Gap, Pennsylvania and Hardwick Township, New Jersey
- Official name: Delaware Water Gap Toll Bridge
- Other name(s): Delaware Water Gap Bridge; Interstate 80 Toll Bridge
- Maintained by: Delaware River Joint Toll Bridge Commission

Characteristics
- Design: Steel plate beam bridge
- Total length: 2,465 ft (751 m)
- Width: 28 ft (8.5 m)

History
- Opened: December 16, 1953; 72 years ago

Statistics
- Toll: Westbound: $5.00 for cars without E-ZPass $2.00 for cars with E-ZPass

Location
- Interactive map of Delaware Water Gap Toll Bridge

The Delaware Water Gap Toll Bridge (also known as the Interstate 80 Toll Bridge) is a toll bridge that carries Interstate 80 across the Delaware River at the Delaware Water Gap, connecting Hardwick Township, Warren County, New Jersey, and Delaware Water Gap, Monroe County, Pennsylvania, in the United States. The bridge was built by the Delaware River Joint Toll Bridge Commission. The 2,465-foot-long (751 m) bridge is a multiple span dual roadway with a steel plate structure. The roadways are 28 feet (8.5 m) wide each and separated from each other by a concrete Jersey barrier.

The facility opened to the public on December 16, 1953, at ceremonies attended by Governor of Pennsylvania John S. Fine and Governor of New Jersey Alfred E. Driscoll. However, local reports indicate that limited vehicle access began on December 13 due to a snowstorm-related detour. The bridge carried US 611 (now Pennsylvania Route 611) for four miles (6.4 km) in New Jersey to a connection with Route 94. I-80 was routed onto the bridge in 1959.

There is a pedestrian sidewalk on the south side of the New Jersey-bound section of the bridge, separated from motor vehicles with a concrete divider. The pedestrian walkway connects Pennsylvania's northern terminus of the Appalachian Trail with New Jersey's southern end. The Delaware Water Gap National Recreation Area straddles both sides of the river near the bridge; Worthington State Forest is located along the bridge's New Jersey side.

A six-lane toll plaza is located on the Pennsylvania side of the bridge, serving westbound traffic only. The toll for 2-axle vehicles is $5.00 with toll-by-plate and $2.00 with E-ZPass.

== See also ==
- List of crossings of the Delaware River
