= Columbia, New Jersey =

Census-designated place in Warren County, New Jersey, US

- Census-designated place
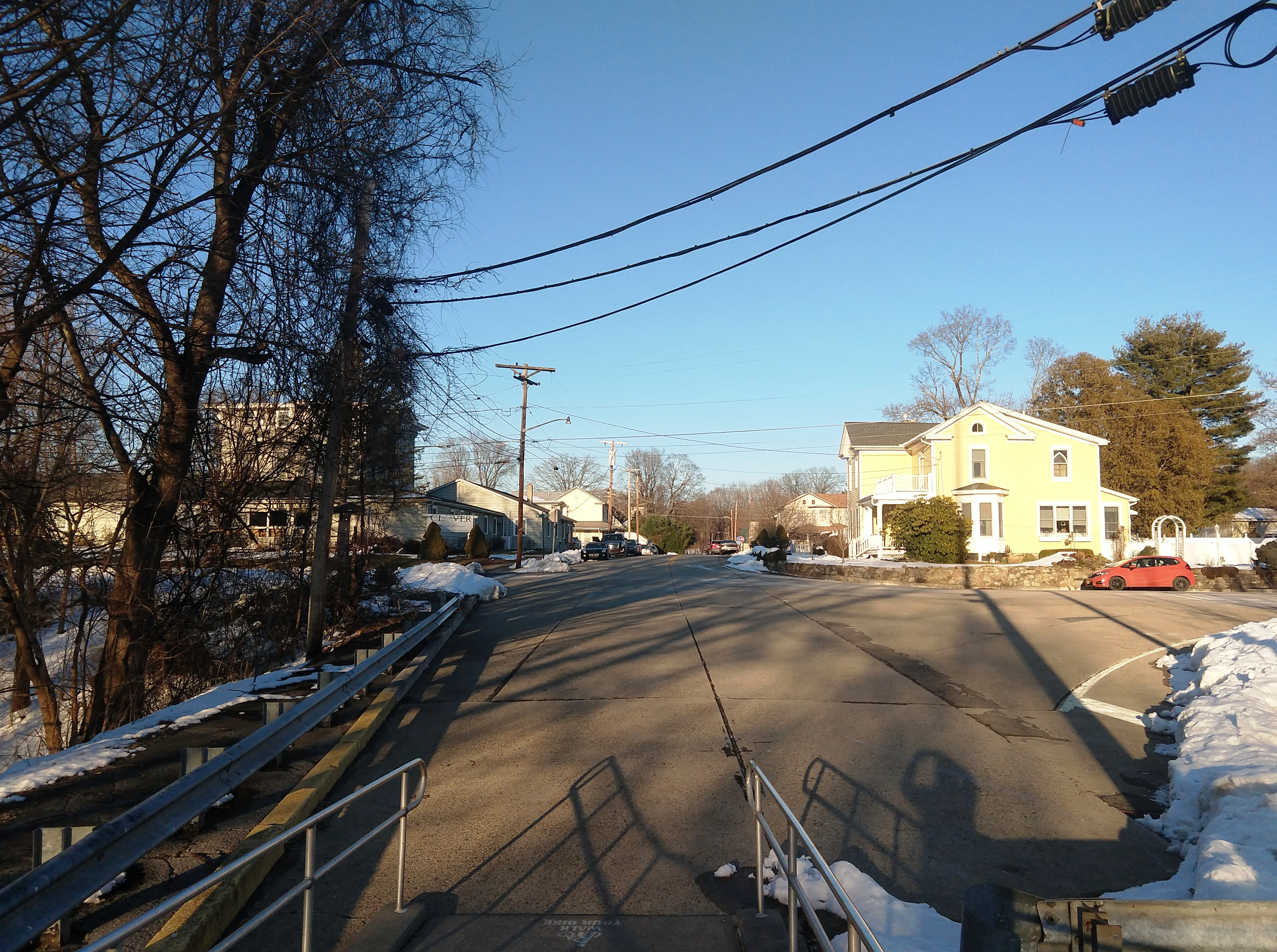
- Columbia as seen from the end of the Portland–Columbia Pedestrian Bridge

- Location in Warren County Location in New Jersey Location in the United States
- Coordinates: 40.925868°N 75.094062°W
- Country: United States
- State: New Jersey
- County: Warren
- Township: Knowlton

Area
  - Total: 0.13 sq mi (0.33 km^{2})
  - Land: 0.10 sq mi (0.26 km^{2})
  - Water: 0.027 sq mi (0.07 km^{2}) 20.94%
- Elevation: 305 ft (93 m)

Population (2020)
  - Total: 215
  - Density: 2,147.8/sq mi (829.28/km^{2})
- Time zone: UTC−05:00 (Eastern (EST))
  - Summer (DST): UTC−04:00 (EDT)
- ZIP Code: 07832
- Area code: 908
- FIPS code: 34-14590
- GNIS feature ID: 02583981

Columbia is an unincorporated community and census-designated place (CDP) located within Knowlton Township in Warren County, in the U.S. state of New Jersey. While the community has existed for over a century, the CDP was created as part of the 2010 United States census. As of the 2020 census, Columbia had a population of 215. The area is served as United States Postal Service ZIP Code 07832.

== History ==
In 1909, Jersey Central Power and Light built the hydroelectric Columbia Lake Dam on the Paulins Kill, forming Columbia Lake. It was removed in 2018 to provide safe fish passage and improve the river and stream habitat.

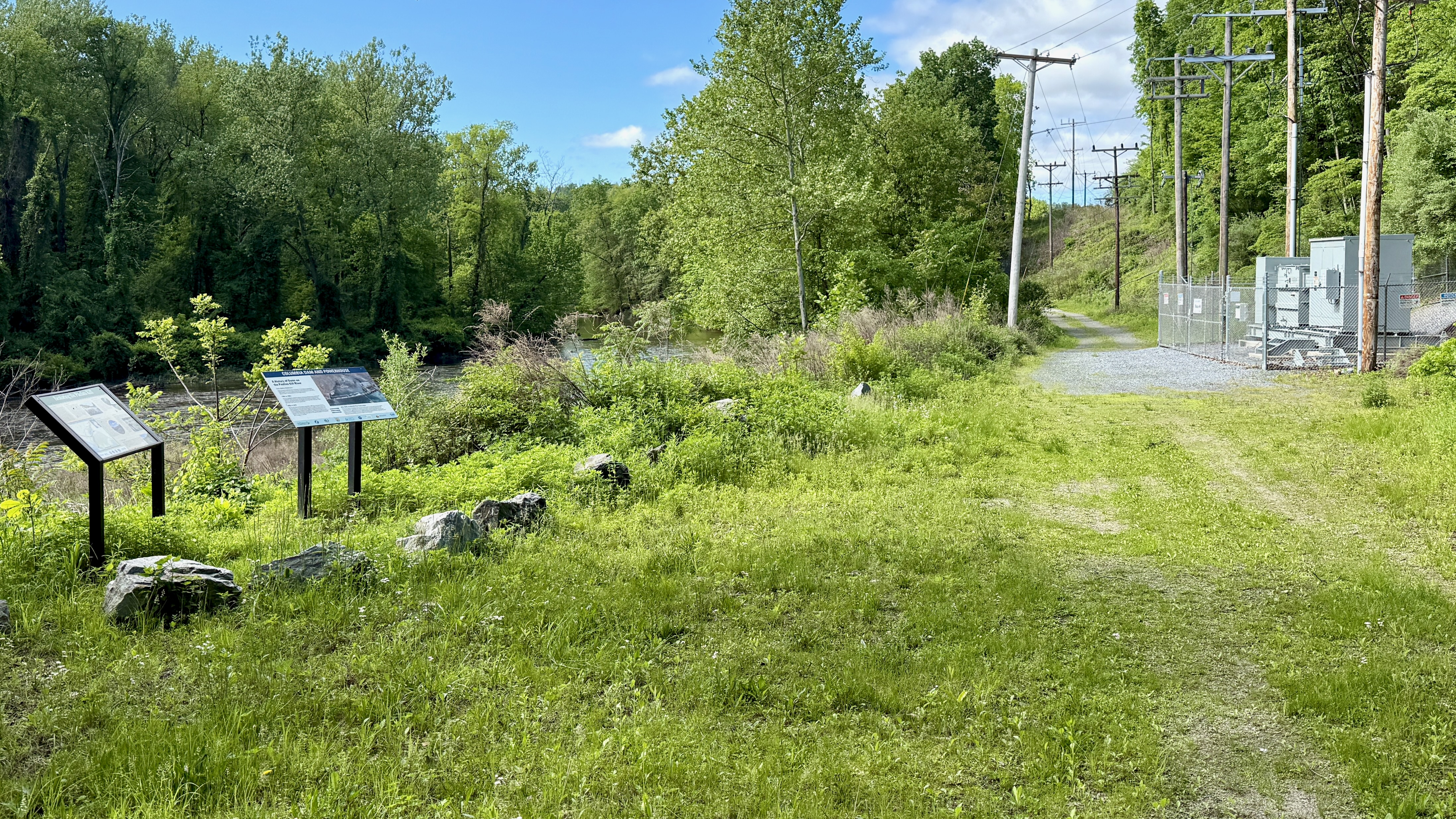
Information signs at the site of the former Columbia Lake Dam

== Geography ==
According to the United States Census Bureau, the CDP had a total area of 0.126 square miles (0.327 km^{2}), including 0.100 square miles (0.258 km^{2}) of land and 0.026 square miles (0.068 km^{2}) of water (20.94%).

== Demographics ==
Historical population
Census	Pop.	Note	%±
2010	229		—
2020	215		−6.1%
U.S. Decennial Census; 2020

Columbia first appeared as a census designated place in the 2010 U.S. census.

=== 2020 census ===
Columbia CDP, New Jersey – Racial and ethnic composition Note: the US Census treats Hispanic/Latino as an ethnic category. This table excludes Latinos from the racial categories and assigns them to a separate category. Hispanics/Latinos may be of any race.
Race / Ethnicity (NH = Non-Hispanic)	Pop 2010	Pop 2020	% 2010	% 2020
White alone (NH)	217	164	94.76%	76.28%
Black or African American alone (NH)	7	0	3.06%	0.00%
Native American or Alaska Native alone (NH)	0	2	0.00%	0.93%
Asian alone (NH)	0	3	0.00%	1.40%
Native Hawaiian or Pacific Islander alone (NH)	0	0	0.00%	0.00%
Other race alone (NH)	0	0	0.00%	0.00%
Mixed race or Multiracial (NH)	0	18	0.00%	8.37%
Hispanic or Latino (any race)	5	28	2.18%	13.02%
Total	229	215	100.00%	100.00%

=== 2010 census ===
The 2010 United States census counted 229 people, 77 households, and 55 families in the CDP. The population density was 2,297.4 per square mile (887.0/km^{2}). There were 85 housing units at an average density of 852.8 per square mile (329.3/km^{2}). The racial makeup was 96.94% (222) White, 3.06% (7) Black or African American, 0.00% (0) Native American, 0.00% (0) Asian, 0.00% (0) Pacific Islander, 0.00% (0) from other races, and 0.00% (0) from two or more races. Hispanic or Latino of any race were 2.18% (5) of the population.

Of the 77 households, 29.9% had children under the age of 18; 50.6% were married couples living together; 18.2% had a female householder with no husband present and 28.6% were non-families. Of all households, 22.1% were made up of individuals and 6.5% had someone living alone who was 65 years of age or older. The average household size was 2.60 and the average family size was 3.00.

19.2% of the population were under the age of 18, 12.2% from 18 to 24, 17.5% from 25 to 44, 32.3% from 45 to 64, and 18.8% who were 65 years of age or older. The median age was 45.4 years. For every 100 females, the population had 90.8 males. For every 100 females ages 18 and older there were 74.5 males.

== Wineries ==
- Brook Hollow Winery
