= Tammany (disambiguation) =

Tammany or Tamanend was a Native American leader.

Tammany or Tamanend may also refer to:

- Mount Tammany, a mountain on the New Jersey/Pennsylvania border
- Tammany Hall, political organization in New York
- Tammany (Williamsport, Maryland), a house on the National Register of Historic Places
- Tammany (horse), a racehorse owned by Marcus Daly
- Tammany Young (1886–1936), American actor
- Tamanend, Pennsylvania, an unincorporated community
- Tamanend Middle School, Warrington, Pennsylvania
- Tamanend (sculpture), a sculpture by William Luke

== See also ==
- Tammanies or Tammany Societies, American fraternal organizations
- St. Tammany Parish, Louisiana
- Tammany Trace, trail in St. Tammany parish
