= Hardwick Township, New Jersey =

Township in Warren County, New Jersey, US

- Township
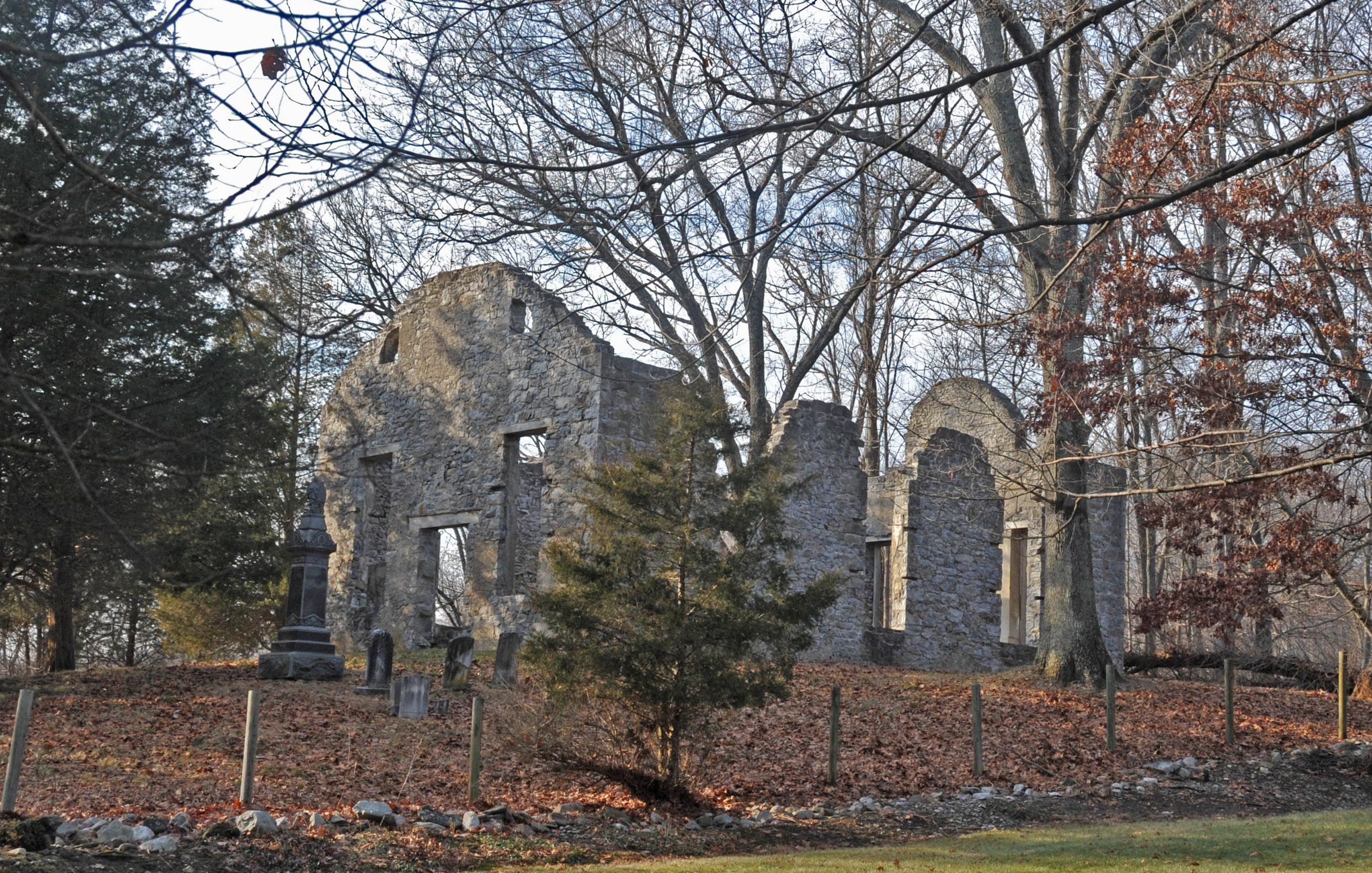
- Spring Valley Christian Church Site in Hardwick Township, July 2007

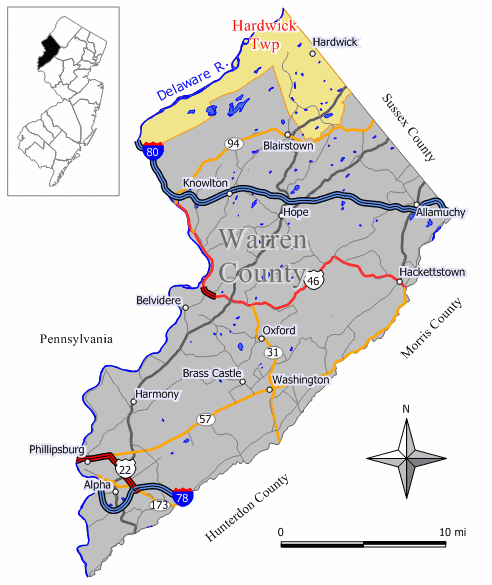
- Location of Hardwick Township in Warren County highlighted in yellow (right). Inset map: Location of Warren County in New Jersey highlighted in black (left).

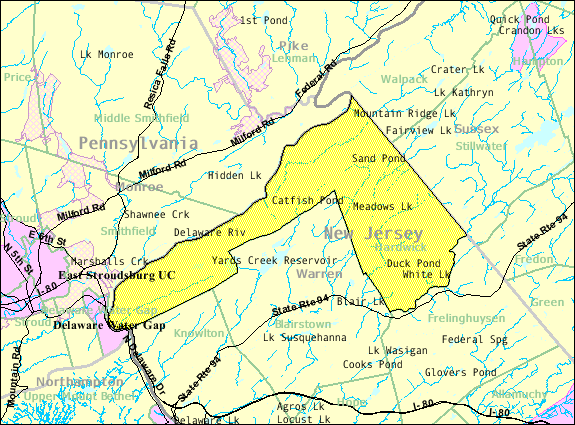
- Census Bureau map of Hardwick Township, New Jersey

- Location in Warren County Location in New Jersey Location in the United States
- Coordinates: 41.039708°N 75.006656°W
- Country: United States
- State: New Jersey
- County: Warren
- Royal charter: January 22, 1750
- Incorporated: February 21, 1798
- Named for: Philip Yorke, 1st Earl of Hardwicke

Government
  - Type: Township
  - Body: Township Committee
  - Mayor: Chris Jacksic (R, term ends December 31, 2025)
  - Municipal clerk: Kristin Shipps

Area
  - Total: 38.94 sq mi (100.85 km^{2})
  - Land: 37.53 sq mi (97.19 km^{2})
  - Water: 1.41 sq mi (3.66 km^{2}) 3.63%
  - Rank: 58th of 565 in state 1st of 22 in county
- Elevation: 827 ft (252 m)

Population (2020)
  - Total: 1,598
  - Estimate (2023): 1,610
  - Rank: 507th of 565 in state 22nd of 22 in county
  - Density: 42.6/sq mi (16.4/km^{2})
  - Rank: 556th of 565 in state 22nd of 22 in county
- Time zone: UTC−05:00 (Eastern (EST))
  - Summer (DST): UTC−04:00 (Eastern (EDT))
- ZIP Code: 07825 – Blairstown, New Jersey
- Area code: 908 exchange: 841
- FIPS code: 3404129820
- GNIS feature ID: 0882239
- Website: www.hardwicktwp.com

Hardwick Township is a township in Warren County, in the U.S. state of New Jersey. As of the 2020 United States census, the township's population was 1,598, a decrease of 98 (−5.8%) from the 2010 census count of 1,696, which in turn reflected an increase of 232 (+15.8%) from the 1,464 counted in the 2000 census.

== History ==
Hardwick Township was created around 1713 through a royal patent. The township was created by Royal charter on January 22, 1750, from Greenwich Township when the area was part of Morris County. It became part of the newly created Sussex County on June 8, 1753. Parts of Hardwick Township were taken on November 11, 1782, to form Independence Township. Hardwick Township was incorporated as a township by an act of the New Jersey Legislature on February 21, 1798. On November 20, 1824, most of Hardwick Township was transferred to form part of Warren County, with the remainder staying in Sussex County as parts of Green Township and Stillwater Township, which were both created as of December 27, 1824. Frelinghuysen Township was created March 7, 1848, from portions of the township. The township was named for Philip Yorke, 1st Earl of Hardwicke.

Hardwick Township's unusual geographic footprint is due to its absorption of Pahaquarry Township, which was dissolved on July 2, 1997. Pahaquarry Township had been created on March 14, 1825, and received its name from the word "Pahaquarra", which was a derivation of the Native American word Pahaqualong used by the Lenape meaning "termination of two mountains" (describing the mountain or mountainous area that was the area's southern border) or "the place between the mountains beside the waters".

== Geography ==
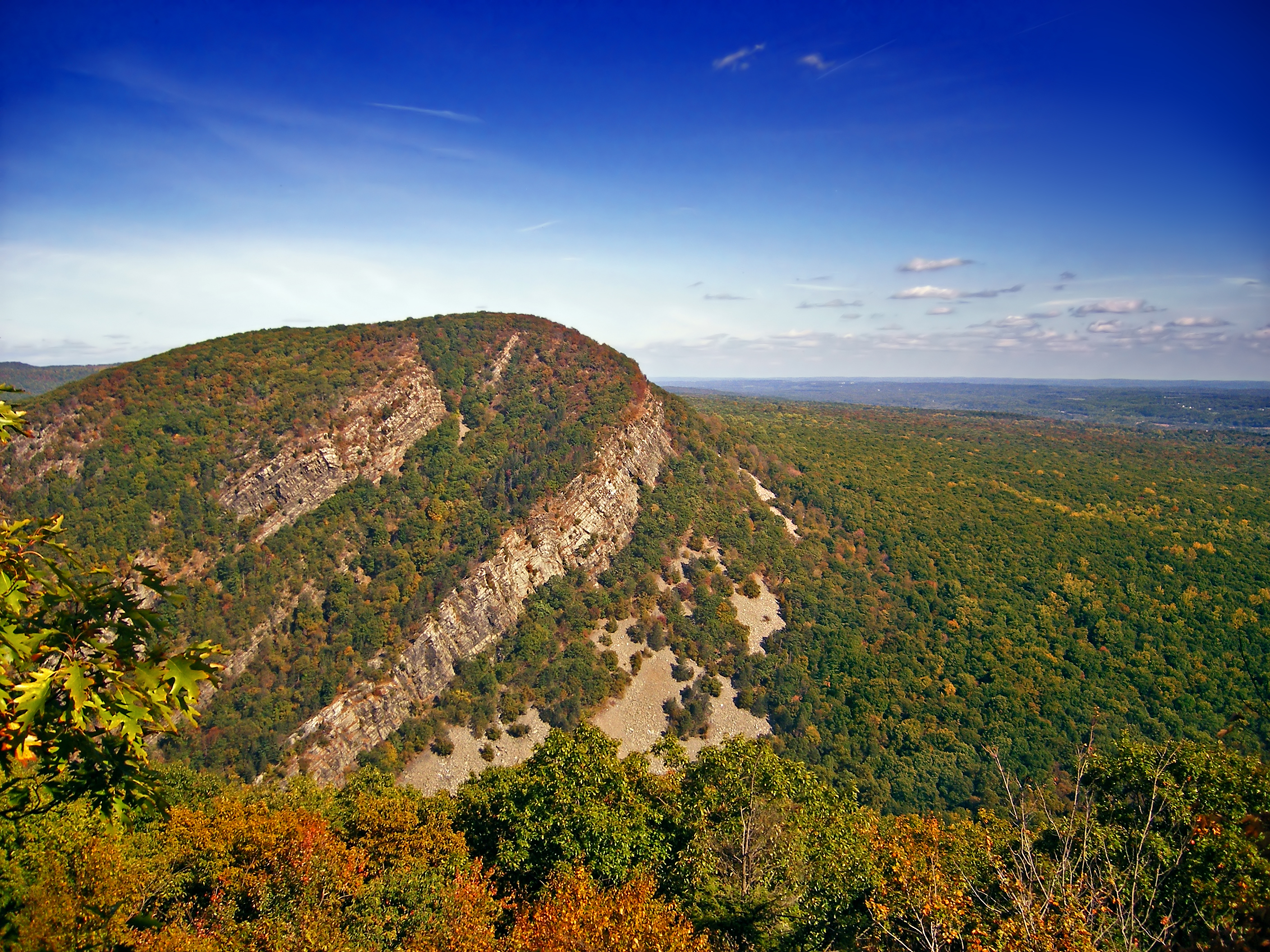
Mount Tammany in Hardwick and Knowlton townships

According to the U.S. Census Bureau, the township had a total area of 38.94 square miles (100.85 km^{2}), including 37.53 square miles (97.19 km^{2}) of land and 1.42 square miles (3.66 km^{2}) of water (3.63%). The part of the township east of the Kittatinny Ridge (the part excluding the now defunct Pahaquarry Township) is located in the Kittatinny Valley which is a section of the Great Appalachian Valley that stretches for 700 miles (1,100 km) from Canada to Alabama. The defunct Pahaquarry section of the Township which borders the Delaware River is located in the Minisink Valley that extends from the Delaware Water Gap north to Port Jervis, New York.

Unincorporated communities, localities and place names located partially or completely within the township include Bass Lake, Franklin Grove, Hardwick, Hardwick Center, Millbrook, Newbakers Corner, Sand Pond, Squares Corner and White Pond.

Sunfish Pond is a 44-acre (18 ha) glacial lake surrounded by a 258-acre (104 ha) hardwood forest located on the Kittatinny Ridge within Worthington State Forest, adjacent to the Delaware Water Gap National Recreation Area. The Appalachian Trail runs alongside the western and northern edges of the lake, which was created by the Wisconsin Glacier during the last ice age. The lake was declared a National Natural Landmark in January 1970.

Camp Ralph S. Mason is a YMCA, established in 1900, that covers 460 acres (190 ha) adjacent to the Delaware Water Gap National Recreation Area that serves approximately 800 campers in its summer camp programs and 7,000 participants at its outdoor center.

The Pahaquarry Copper Mine is an abandoned copper mine. Active mining was attempted for brief periods during the mid-eighteenth, mid-nineteenth, and early twentieth centuries but was never successful. The site is administered by the National Park Service.

Hardwick Township borders the municipalities of Blairstown, Frelinghuysen Township, and Knowlton Township in Warren County; and Stillwater Township and Walpack Township in Sussex County.

== Demographics ==
Historical population
Census	Pop.	Note	%±
1810	2,528		—
1820	2,335		−7.6%
1830	1,962	*	−16.0%
1840	1,957		−0.3%
1850	727	*	−62.9%
1860	792		8.9%
1870	638		−19.4%
1880	583		−8.6%
1890	503		−13.7%
1900	400		−20.5%
1910	405		1.3%
1920	352		−13.1%
1930	331		−6.0%
1940	367		10.9%
1950	370		0.8%
1960	370		0.0%
1970	548		48.1%
1980	947		72.8%
1990	1,235		30.4%
2000	1,464	*	18.5%
2010	1,696		15.8%
2020	1,598		−5.8%
2023 (est.)	1,610		0.8%
Population sources: 1810–1920 1840 1850–1870; 1850 1870 1880–1890; 1890–1910 1910–1930; 1940–2000 2000; 2010 2020 * = Territory chg. in previous decade.

The township's economic data, like all of Warren County, is included by the U.S. Census Bureau as part of the Allentown-Bethlehem-Easton, PA-NJ Metropolitan Statistical Area.

=== 2010 census ===
The 2010 United States census counted 1,696 people, 573 households, and 453 families in the township. The population density was 46.3 inhabitants per square mile (17.9/km^{2}). There were 619 housing units at an average density of 16.9 per square mile (6.5/km^{2}). The racial makeup was 96.99% (1,645) White, 0.94% (16) Black or African American, 0.00% (0) Native American, 0.65% (11) Asian, 0.00% (0) Pacific Islander, 0.71% (12) from other races, and 0.71% (12) from two or more races. Hispanic or Latino of any race were 3.95% (67) of the population.

Of the 573 households, 33.9% had children under the age of 18; 67.9% were married couples living together; 6.5% had a female householder with no husband present and 20.9% were non-families. Of all households, 16.2% were made up of individuals and 7.3% had someone living alone who was 65 years of age or older. The average household size was 2.86 and the average family size was 3.19.

24.8% of the population were under the age of 18, 8.1% from 18 to 24, 19.3% from 25 to 44, 35.3% from 45 to 64, and 12.6% who were 65 years of age or older. The median age was 43.8 years. For every 100 females, the population had 95.6 males. For every 100 females ages 18 and older there were 92.3 males.

The Census Bureau's 2006–2010 American Community Survey showed that (in 2010 inflation-adjusted dollars) median household income was $96,094 (with a margin of error of +/− $6,827) and the median family income was $105,469 (+/− $14,654). Males had a median income of $77,045 (+/− $8,432) versus $46,667 (+/− $3,953) for females. The per capita income for the borough was $38,377 (+/− $5,353). About 3.0% of families and 3.5% of the population were below the poverty line, including 6.3% of those under age 18 and none of those age 65 or over.

=== 2000 census ===
As of the 2000 United States census there were 1,464 people, 502 households, and 410 families residing in the township. The population density was 40.1 inhabitants per square mile (15.5/km^{2}). There were 530 housing units at an average density of 14.5 per square mile (5.6/km^{2}). The racial makeup of the township was 97.06% White, 0.61% African American, 0.07% Native American, 0.41% Asian, 0.89% from other races, and 0.96% from two or more races. Hispanic or Latino of any race were 2.32% of the population.

There were 502 households, out of which 38.6% had children under the age of 18 living with them, 74.3% were married couples living together, 5.6% had a female householder with no husband present, and 18.3% were non-families. 13.9% of all households were made up of individuals, and 5.2% had someone living alone who was 65 years of age or older. The average household size was 2.85 and the average family size was 3.15.

In the township the population was spread out, with 26.6% under the age of 18, 5.2% from 18 to 24, 29.1% from 25 to 44, 29.5% from 45 to 64, and 9.6% who were 65 years of age or older. The median age was 39 years. For every 100 females, there were 99.7 males. For every 100 females age 18 and over, there were 95.1 males.

The median income for a household in the township was $72,167, and the median income for a family was $76,111. Males had a median income of $56,000 versus $31,875 for females. The per capita income for the township was $30,038. About 0.5% of families and 2.6% of the population were below the poverty line, including 0.5% of those under age 18 and 2.2% of those age 65 or over.

== Government ==
=== Local government ===
Hardwick Township is governed under the Township form of New Jersey municipal government, one of 141 municipalities (of the 564) statewide that use this form, the second-most commonly used form of government in the state. The governing body is comprised of a three-member Township Committee, whose members are elected directly by the voters at-large in partisan elections to serve three-year terms of office on a staggered basis, with one seat coming up for election each year as part of the November general election in a three-year cycle. At an annual reorganization meeting, the Township Committee selects one of its members to serve as Mayor and another as Deputy Mayor.

As of 2025 members of the Hardwick Township Committee are Mayor Chris Jacksic (R, term on committee ends December 31, 2027; term as mayor ends 2025), Deputy Mayor Nichole L. Meuse (R, term on committee and as deputy mayor ends 2025) and John C. Lovell Jr. (R, 2026).

=== Federal, state, and county representation ===
Hardwick Township is located in the 7th Congressional District and is part of New Jersey's 23rd state legislative district.

For the 119th United States Congress, New Jersey's 7th congressional district is represented by Thomas Kean Jr. (R, Westfield). New Jersey is represented in the United States Senate by Democrats Cory Booker (Newark, term ends 2027) and Andy Kim (Moorestown, term ends 2031).

For the 2026–2027 session, the 23rd legislative district of the New Jersey Legislature is represented in the State Senate by Doug Steinhardt (R, Lopatcong Township) and in the General Assembly by John DiMaio (R, Hackettstown) and Erik Peterson (R, Franklin Township).

Warren County is governed by a three-member Board of County Commissioners, who are chosen at-large on a staggered basis in partisan elections with one seat coming up for election each year as part of the November general election. At an annual reorganization meeting held in the beginning of January, the board selects one of its members to serve as Commissioner Director and other as Deputy Director. As of 2025, Warren County's Commissioners are:

Deputy Director Jason J. Sarnoski (R, Lopatcong Township; 2025), Lori Ciesla (R, Lopatcong Township; 2026), and Director James R. Kern III (R, Pohatcong Township; 2027).

Constitutional officers of Warren County are: Clerk Holly Mackey (R, Alpha; 2027), Sheriff James McDonald Sr. (R, Phillipsburg; 2025) and Surrogate Michael J. Doherty (R, Washington; 2025).

=== Politics ===
As of March 2011, there were a total of 1,097 registered voters in Hardwick Township, of which 195 (17.8% vs. 21.5% countywide) were registered as Democrats, 480 (43.8% vs. 35.3%) were registered as Republicans and 422 (38.5% vs. 43.1%) were registered as Unaffiliated. There were no voters registered to other parties. Among the township's 2010 Census population, 64.7% (vs. 62.3% in Warren County) were registered to vote, including 86.0% of those ages 18 and over (vs. 81.5% countywide).

Gubernatorial election results for Hardwick Township
Year	Republican		Democratic		Third party(ies)	
Year	No.	%	No.	%	No.	%
2025	517	63.83%	288	35.56%	5	0.62%
2021	465	69.30%	202	30.10%	4	0.60%
2017	314	63.56%	162	32.79%	18	3.64%
2013	299	72.93%	102	24.88%	9	2.20%
2009	343	61.69%	151	27.16%	62	11.15%
2005	327	62.17%	166	31.56%	33	6.27%

In the 2012 presidential election, Republican Mitt Romney received 446 votes (59.9% vs. 56.0% countywide), ahead of Democrat Barack Obama with 267 votes (35.8% vs. 40.8%) and other candidates with 18 votes (2.4% vs. 1.7%), among the 745 ballots cast by the township's 1,123 registered voters, for a turnout of 66.3% (vs. 66.7% in Warren County). In the 2008 presidential election, Republican John McCain received 473 votes (57.9% vs. 55.2% countywide), ahead of Democrat Barack Obama with 310 votes (37.9% vs. 41.4%) and other candidates with 17 votes (2.1% vs. 1.6%), among the 817 ballots cast by the township's 1,075 registered voters, for a turnout of 76.0% (vs. 73.4% in Warren County). In the 2004 presidential election, Republican George W. Bush received 536 votes (65.7% vs. 61.0% countywide), ahead of Democrat John Kerry with 272 votes (33.3% vs. 37.2%) and other candidates with 5 votes (0.6% vs. 1.3%), among the 816 ballots cast by the township's 1,019 registered voters, for a turnout of 80.1% (vs. 76.3% in the whole county).

United States presidential election results for Hardwick Township
Year	Republican		Democratic		Third party(ies)	
Year	No.	%	No.	%	No.	%
2024	667	65.33%	342	33.50%	12	1.18%
2020	638	61.82%	383	37.11%	11	1.07%
2016	533	61.69%	286	33.10%	45	5.21%
2012	446	61.01%	267	36.53%	18	2.46%
2008	473	59.13%	310	38.75%	17	2.13%
2004	536	65.93%	272	33.46%	5	0.62%

In the 2013 gubernatorial election, Republican Chris Christie received 72.9% of the vote (299 cast), ahead of Democrat Barbara Buono with 24.9% (102 votes), and other candidates with 2.2% (9 votes), among the 427 ballots cast by the township's 1,141 registered voters (17 ballots were spoiled), for a turnout of 37.4%. In the 2009 gubernatorial election, Republican Chris Christie received 343 votes (61.4% vs. 61.3% countywide), ahead of Democrat Jon Corzine with 151 votes (27.0% vs. 25.7%), Independent Chris Daggett with 46 votes (8.2% vs. 9.8%) and other candidates with 16 votes (2.9% vs. 1.5%), among the 559 ballots cast by the township's 1,065 registered voters, yielding a 52.5% turnout (vs. 49.6% in the county).

United States Senate election results for Hardwick Township1
Year	Republican		Democratic		Third party(ies)	
Year	No.	%	No.	%	No.	%
2024	650	65.66%	327	33.03%	13	1.31%
2018	445	61.21%	248	34.11%	34	4.68%
2012	418	59.97%	261	37.45%	18	2.58%
2006	296	59.68%	176	35.48%	24	4.84%

United States Senate election results for Hardwick Township2
Year	Republican		Democratic		Third party(ies)	
Year	No.	%	No.	%	No.	%
2020	619	62.15%	357	35.84%	20	2.01%
2014	254	63.50%	131	32.75%	15	3.75%
2013	219	66.57%	108	32.83%	2	0.61%
2008	466	61.15%	277	36.35%	19	2.49%

== Education ==
For kindergarten through sixth grade, public school students attend Blairstown Elementary School in Blairstown as part of the Blairstown Township School District. The Hardwick Township Board of Education was dissolved and merged into the Blairstown district as of the 2009–10 school year. The school property tax levies for the 2009–10 year were left unchanged, with the tax levy for subsequent years apportioned based 78.8% on enrollment and 21.2% on the equalized value of property on the two municipalities. As of the 2023–24 school year, the district, comprised of one school, had an enrollment of 428 students and 43.8 classroom teachers (on an FTE basis), for a student–teacher ratio of 9.8:1.

Students in seventh through twelfth grades for public school attend the North Warren Regional High School in Blairstown, a public secondary high school, serving students from Blairstown, Frelinghuysen, Hardwick and Knowlton townships. As of the 2023–24 school year, the high school had an enrollment of 619 students and 54.8 classroom teachers (on an FTE basis), for a student–teacher ratio of 11.3:1. Seats on the high school district's nine-member board of education are allocated based on the population of the constituent municipalities, with one seat allocated to Hardwick Township.

Students from the township and from all of Warren County are eligible to attend Ridge and Valley Charter School in Frelinghuysen Township (for grades K–8, with Hardwick residents granted admissions priority) or Warren County Technical School in Washington borough (for 9–12), with special education services provided by local districts supplemented throughout the county by the Warren County Special Services School District in Oxford Township (for Pre-K–12).

== Transportation ==
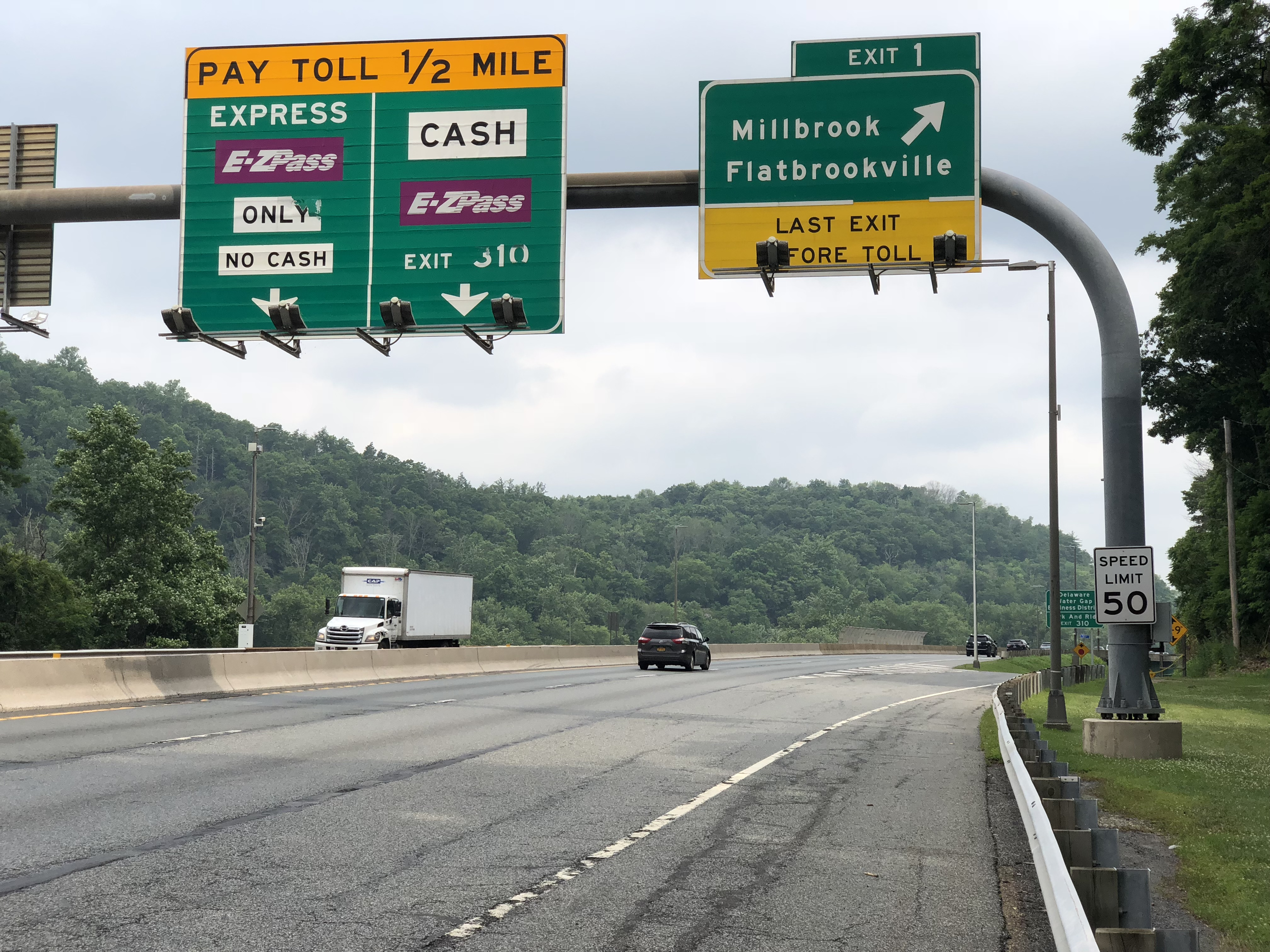
Interstate 80 westbound in Hardwick Township

As of May 2010, the township had a total of 41.74 miles (67.17 km) of roadways, of which 28.55 miles (45.95 km) were maintained by the municipality, 11.68 miles (18.80 km) by Warren County, 1.01 miles (1.63 km) by the New Jersey Department of Transportation and 0.50 miles (0.80 km) by the Delaware River Joint Toll Bridge Commission.

The only major roads that pass through are County Route 521 in the eastern part and Interstate 80 in the very west. The portion of Interstate 80 also includes part of the Delaware Water Gap Toll Bridge which connects to Pennsylvania.

Old Mine Road, a scenic road that runs along the Delaware River, is said to be among the oldest roads in the Northeast used for the business purposes. It originates in Hardwick at Interstate 80 and continues to the northeast into Walpack Township.

== Popular culture ==
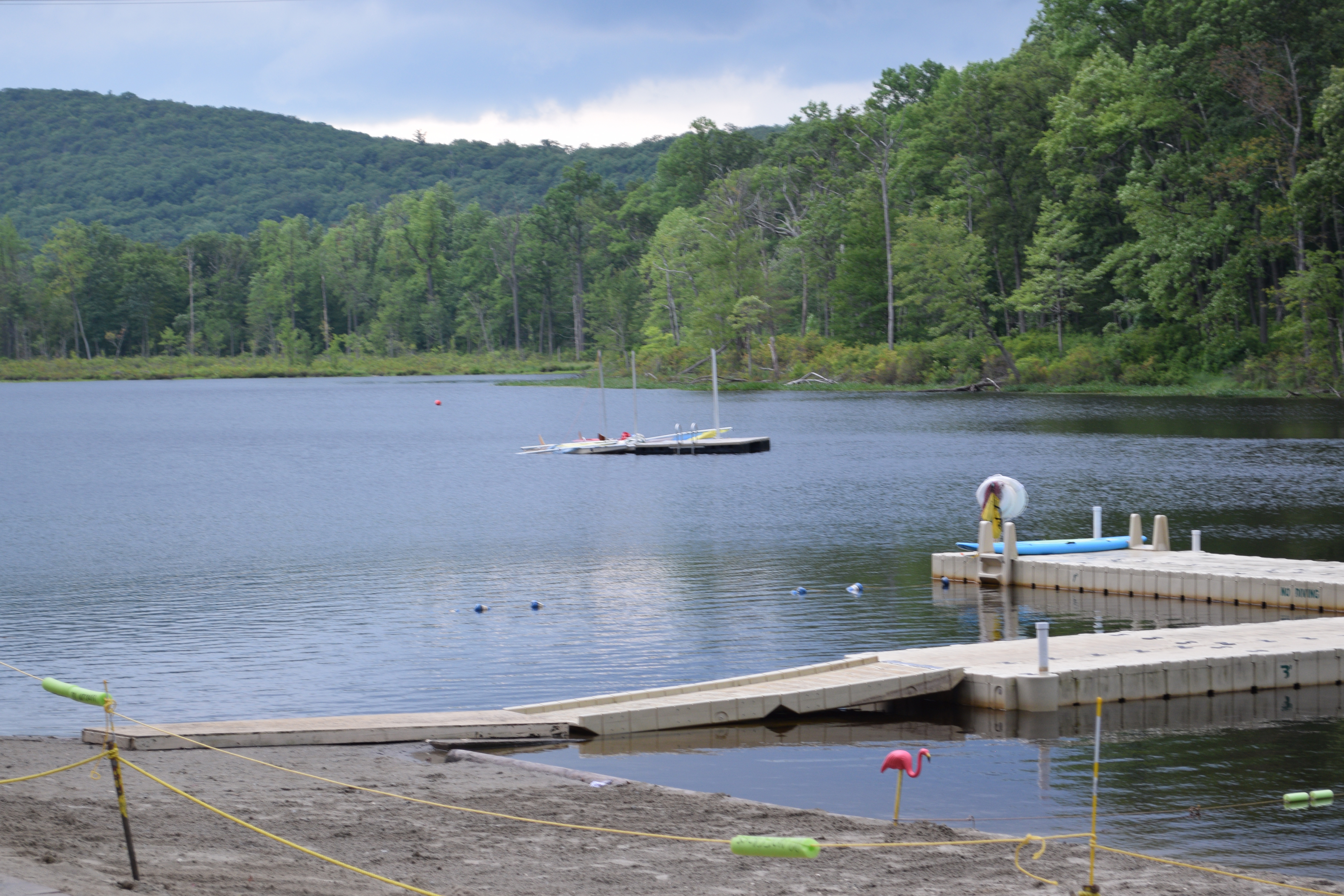
Camp No-Be-Bo-Sco

The original Friday the 13th movie was filmed at Hardwick's local Boy Scout Camp, No-Be-Bo-Sco.

== Notable people ==
People who were born in, residents of, or otherwise closely associated with Hardwick Township include:

- John Linn (1763–1821), member of the United States House of Representatives from New Jersey from 1817 to 1821
- Benjamin Lundy (1789–1839), Quaker abolitionist
- Lou Reed (1942–2013), rock performer
