= Mount Mohican =

Mountain in New Jersey, United States

- Raccoon Ridge

Highest point
- Elevation: 1,580 ft (480 m) NGVD 29
- Prominence: 40 ft (12 m)
- Coordinates: 41°0′54″N 75°2′32″W

Geography
- Location: Warren County, New Jersey, U.S.
- Parent range: Kittatinny Mountains

Climbing
- Easiest route: Hiking

Mount Mohican, or Raccoon Ridge, is a peak of the Kittatinny Mountains in Warren County, New Jersey, United States. The mountain stands 1,580 feet (482 m) in height. It lies along the Appalachian Trail in Worthington State Forest.

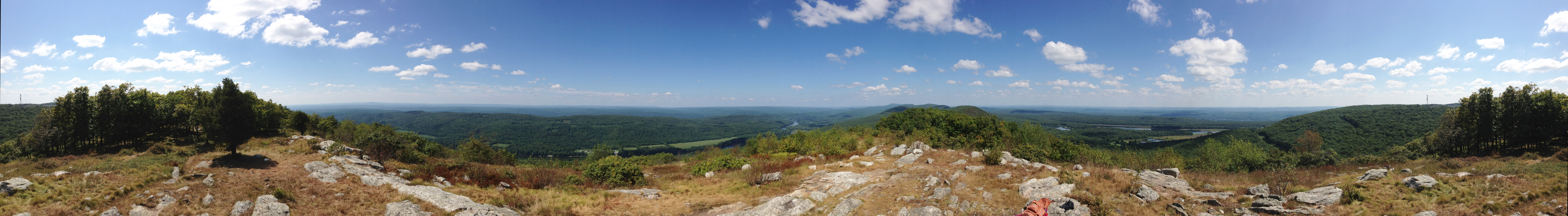
View from Mount Mohican
