= Mount Tammany Fire Road =

Road on Kittatinny Mountain, New Jersey, U.S.

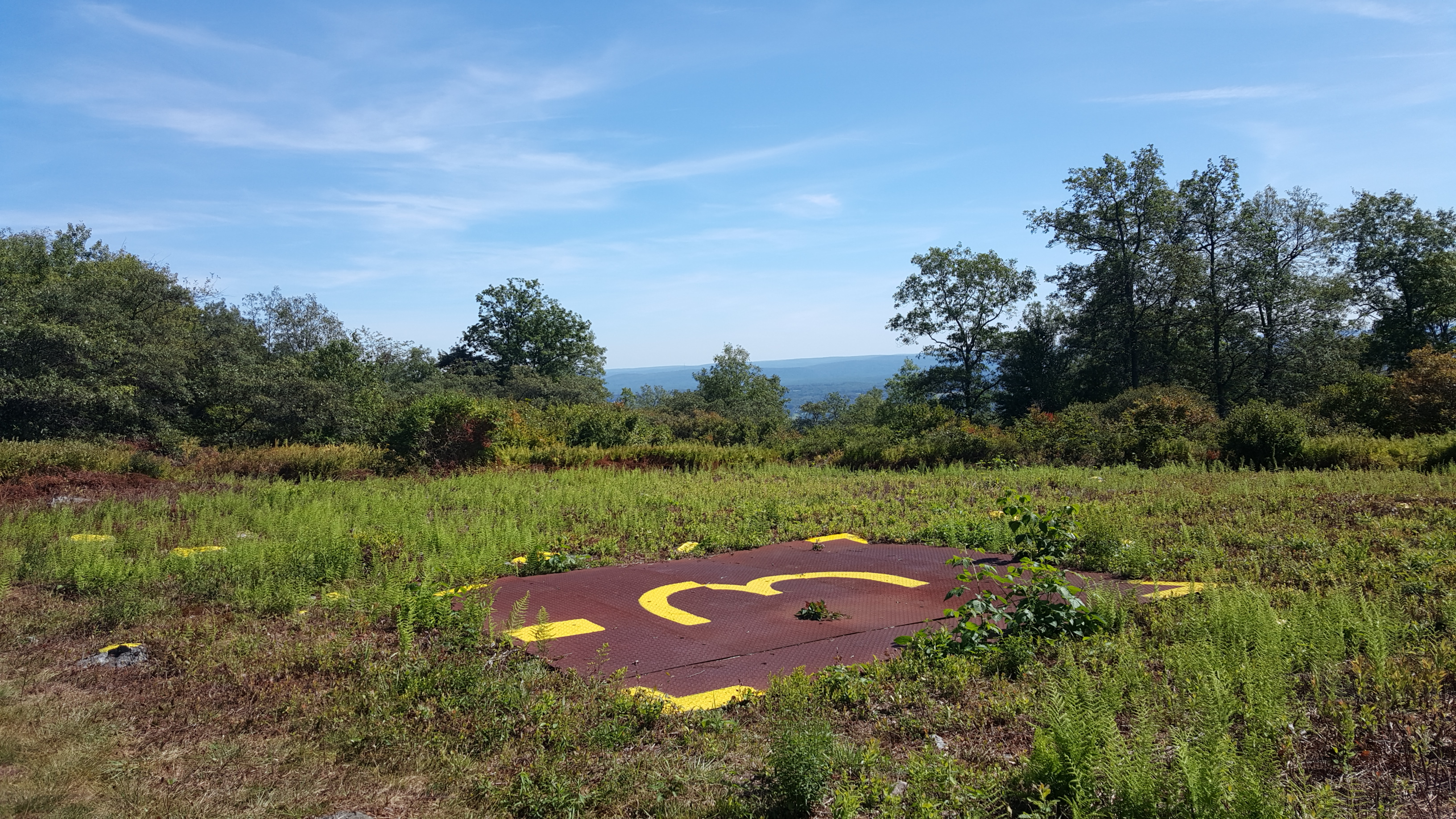
View looking east at the New Jersey Forest Fire Service's Helispot 3 along the Mount Tammany Fire Road on Kittatinny Mountain

The Mount Tammany Fire Road is an unpaved 4.5-mile (7.2 km) road on the eastern ridgeline of Kittatinny Mountain from Upper Yards Creek Reservoir to Mount Tammany, the 1,527-foot (465 m) prominence on the New Jersey side of the Delaware Water Gap. The fire road, located within Worthington State Forest, is maintained as a firebreak and access road for wildfire suppression efforts by the New Jersey Forest Fire Service. There are three helispots along the fire road used by the Forest Fire Service.

The Mount Tammany Fire Road was constructed as a dozer line created after the 1976 Dunnfield Creek fire on Kittatinny Mountain which consumed over 2,000 acres (8.1 km^{2}) of forests from April 18 to April 22, 1976. Today, the road is often used as part of a loop with the Appalachian Trail, Sunfish Pond Fire Road, Dunnfield Creek trail and other trails by hikers visiting the Delaware Water Gap. The Mount Tammany Fire Road connects with the Blue Dot Trail, Red Dot Trail, Turquoise and Taylor Trails on Mount Tammany.

== Locations ==
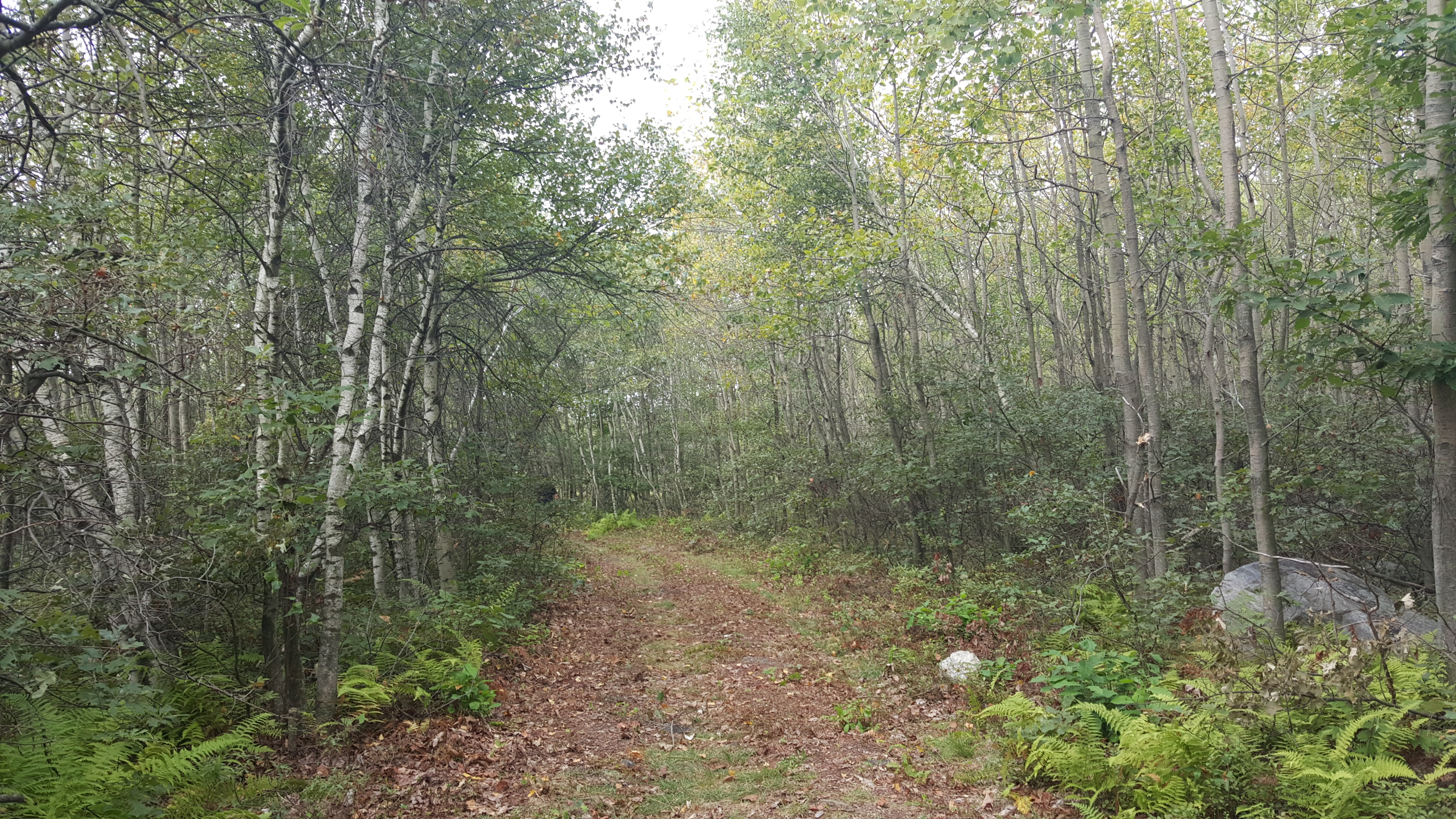
Grove of aspen and birch trees along the Mount Tammany Fire Road

- Southern terminus: 40°58′09″N 75°06′41″W (Mount Tammany)
- Helispot 1: 40°58′12″N 75°06′44″W
- Helispot 2: 40°58′55″N 75°05′01″W
- Helispot 3: 40°59′37″N 75°03′22″W
- Northern terminus: 40°59′58″N 75°02′53″W (Upper Yards Creek Reservoir)
