= Spring Valley Christian Church Site =

Historic church in New Jersey, United States

- U.S. National Register of Historic Places
- New Jersey Register of Historic Places
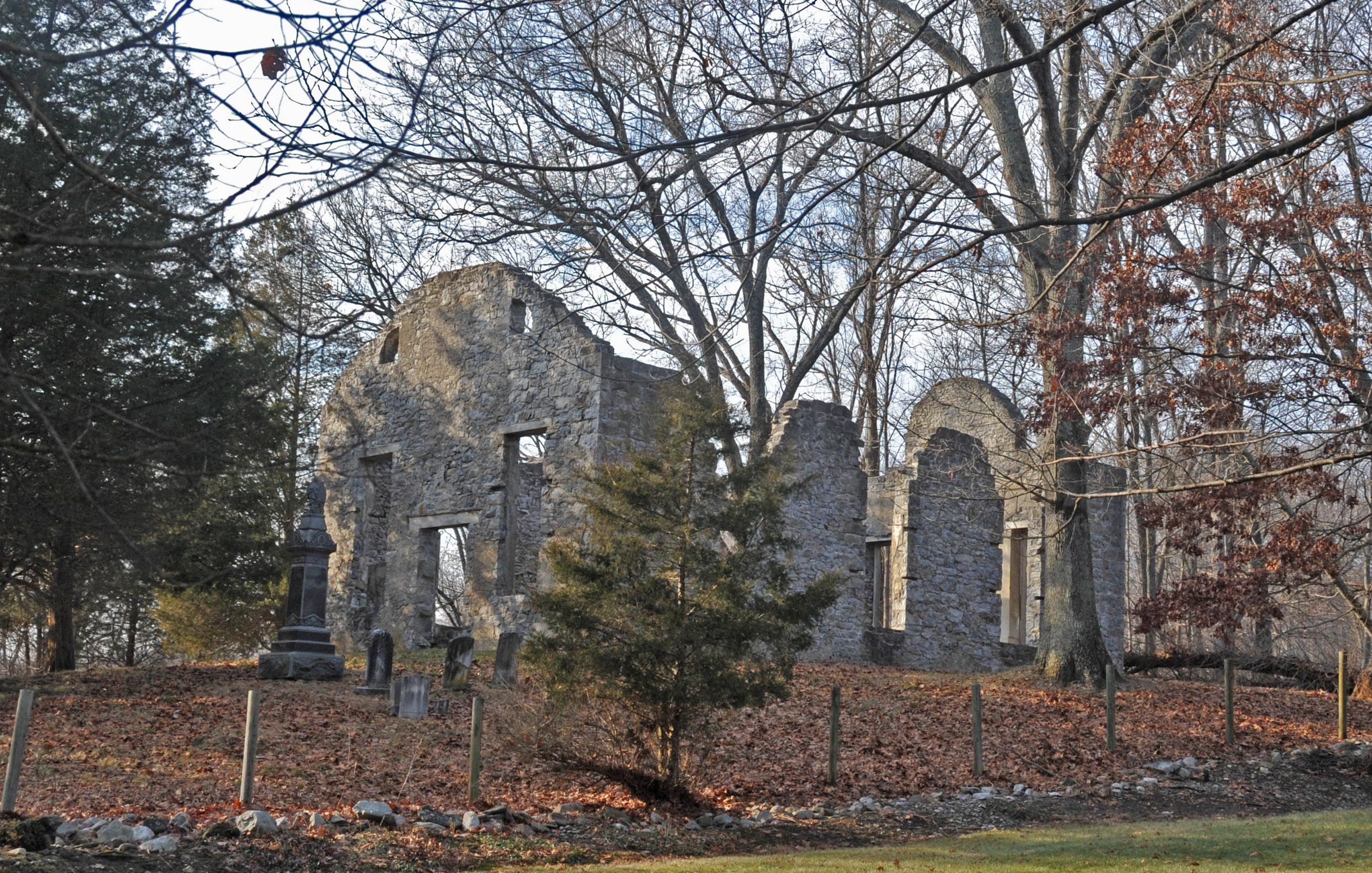
- Spring Valley Christian Church in Hardwick Township, New Jersey

- Location within Warren County, New Jersey Location within New Jersey Location within the United States
- Location: Spring Valley Rd., 0.5 mi. E of Hardwick Center, Hardwick Township, New Jersey, U.S.
- Coordinates: 41°0′20″N 74°56′23″W
- Area: less than one acre
- Built: 1840
- Architectural style: Greek Revival
- NRHP reference No.: 97001147
- NJRHP No.
- Added to NRHP: September 18, 1997

Spring Valley Christian Church Site is a historic site on Spring Valley Road, 0.5 miles east of Hardwick Center in Hardwick Township in Warren County, New Jersey.

The Greek Revival-style building was constructed in 1840. It was added to the National Register of Historic Places in 1997.

== See also ==
- National Register of Historic Places listings in Warren County, New Jersey
