= Camp Ralph S. Mason =

Summer camp in New Jersey, US

YMCA Camp Mason
- YMCA Camp Mason
- Formation: 1900
- Type: Summer Camp and Outdoor Center
- Location: Hardwick, New Jersey, USA
- Coordinates: 41.035761°N 74.953301°W
- Executive Director: Keith VanDerzee
- Chief Volunteer Officer: Thomas Mason
- Affiliations: YMCA; American Camp Association,
- Staff: 85
- Website: campmason.org
- Formerly called: YMCA Camp Washington; YMCA Camp Wilson; Central New Jersey Y Camps

YMCA Camp Mason is a YMCA summer camp located in Hardwick Township, New Jersey. The 460-acre site is located next to the Delaware Water Gap National Recreation Area. Camp Mason annually serves approximately 1000 campers in its summer camp programs, and over 8,000 participants at its outdoor center.

== History ==
Established in 1900 as YMCA Camp Washington, YMCA Camp Mason was founded by the Trenton/Mercer YMCA. A small group of boys and YMCA leaders camped on property near Washington Crossing, PA, owned by the family of Edward Marshall. In 1903 the family sold an island property on the PA side of the Delaware River (Marshall's Island, also known as Eagle Island) to the Trenton/Mercer YMCA, who moved the camp there and renamed it YMCA Camp Wilson. In 1955 a flood inundated the site, and the camp relocated to Hardwick, NJ, changing its name a third time to Central New Jersey YMCA Camps. In the late 1970s the camp changed names again to YMCA Camp Ralph S. Mason to honor the man who was instrumental in rebuilding after the flood. Ralph Mason served as the volunteer chairman of the board of trustees for 35 years. His son Tom Mason is the chief volunteer officer and the current board president.

== Facilities ==
Camp Mason's facilities include a boat house on the lake, a swimming pool, an area known as 'The Courts', which includes basketball and street hockey courts, a skate park and a gaga pit, an athletic field, two ropes courses, a dining hall and six cabins for each of the four villages. Each village also contains a singular cabin for the village director, and an additional set of two cabins is located in the Hilltop village to house the CITs. The Spruce Lodge, which previously housed girls in the Ranch Camp program has been converted into a staff-lounge area and the medical staff and additional bunks are housed in Hillside Lodge.

== Programs ==
Camp Mason's summer programs include a traditional co-ed overnight camp, day camp, and adventure trips camp. Teens who have finished the 10th grade can participate in the Counselor-in-Training program. Camp Mason's Outdoor Center offers programs for families, school groups, and business retreats.

=== Overnight Camp ===
Mason offers a traditional overnight camp for boys and girls who have finished grades two through nine. Overnight campers are split into senior villages (grades seven through nine) and junior villages (grades two through six). Each age group is then split into boys' and girls' villages: Lakeside (junior boys), Hilltop (junior girls), Skyview (senior boys), and Ridgeline (senior girls). Each village has 6 cabins, usually with two counselors in each cabin. The counselor to camper ratio is about one to five. Overnight camp is offered in two or four week sessions, with one week sessions available for young first-time campers.

A typical day at camp includes flag raising, breakfast, cabin cleanup, cabin activity, camper's choice, lunch, siesta, activity periods 1–2, free time, flag lowering, dinner, village activity, cabin chat, and taps. The three activity periods are electives, allowing campers to customize their experience. Activity choices are made at the beginning of each week and range from basketball, and swimming to arts and crafts, and stop motion. Campers can also sign-up for hiking, climbing, and rafting day trips in the Delaware Water Gap. Weekends at camp follow themes, such as Harry Potter, Olympics, or Superheroes, with special activities for the given theme.

=== Day Camp ===
Since 1972 Camp Mason has offered YMCA Day Camp Shannon to children in Kindergarten through sixth grade for residents of the Blairstown – Hardwick – Knowlton area of North Warren County, NJ. Day camp starts at 9:00 am and ends at 4:00 pm, and before and after camp care is available. Camp Shannon offers financial aid for those in need. The day camp shares the facilities of the overnight camp including the pool, playing fields, and rock wall.

=== Teen Programs (Counselor-in-Training Program) ===
Camp Mason's CIT program is a four-week co-ed residential experience. The teens learn many skills and work in all aspects of a counselors job at camp. The first two weeks consist of leadership training and activities run by the CIT counselors, the second two weeks place the CITs in cabins with junior campers with another actual counselor. The CITs train using the staff handbook and work on topics such as behavior management and leadership. Participants in the program also complete one or more service projects to help improve camp. CIT applicants must be sixteen years old and have finished tenth grade. Entry into the program is very competitive.

== Financial aid ==
Camp Mason prides itself on its financial aid program. The camp is dedicated to bringing every child they can to camp, regardless of financial need. Annually, Camp Mason provides more than $100,000 in financial assistance to campers.
