= Mount Minsi =

Mountain in Pennsylvania, United States

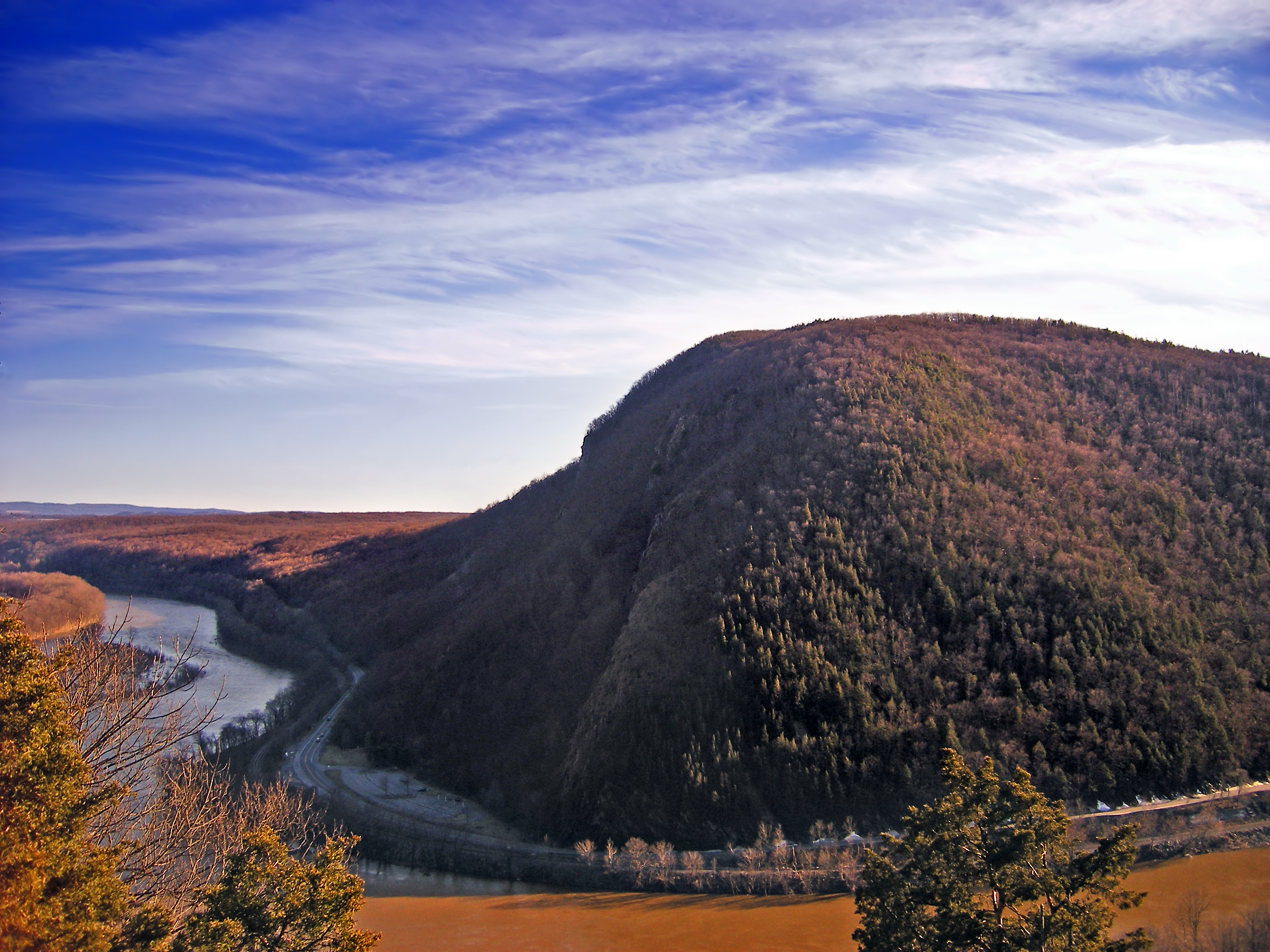
- Mount Minsi seen from the northeast in March 2007

Highest point
- Elevation: 1,461 ft (445 m)
- Prominence: 181 ft (55 m)
- Parent peak: Kittatinny Mountain in Warren County, New Jersey, U.S.
- Coordinates: 40°57′33″N 75°07′48″W

Geography
- Location within Pennsylvania
- Location: Delaware Water Gap in Monroe County, Pennsylvania, U.S.
- Parent range: Blue Mountain
- Topo map: USGS 7½' Stroudsburg

Geology
- Rock age: Silurian
- Mountain type: Sedimentary

Climbing
- Easiest route: Appalachian Trail (hike)

Mount Minsi forms the Pennsylvania side of the Delaware Water Gap, and is the eastern extent of the Blue Mountain. It is composed of sandstone and conglomerates of the Shawangunk Formation.

== Hiking ==
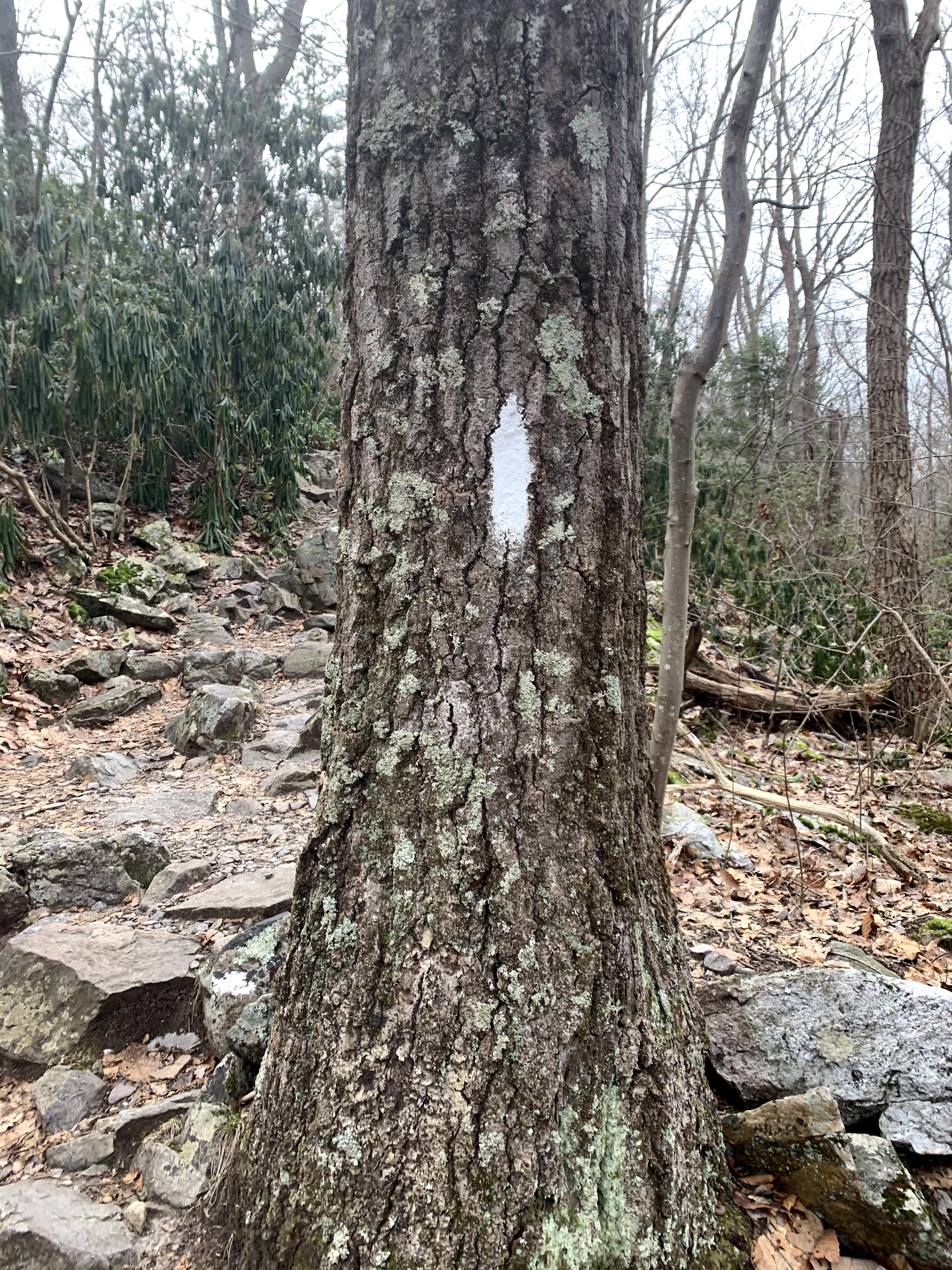
Appalachian Trail blaze on the hike to Mt. Minsi's summit

The easiest route to the summit of Minsi is by way of the Appalachian Trail, from the Lake Lenape trailhead near the town of Delaware Water Gap. The Mount Minsi fire road shares and parallels parts of the same route on the same northwest slopes. Both travel about 5 miles (8 km) round trip, and gain 1,020 feet (310 m) of elevation.

== Climbing ==
The band of exposed metaquartzite cliffs on east face of Minsi hold a number of traditional climbing routes. The earliest of these were put up in 1975, and established routes range from 5.0 to 5.12+. Winter can offer some mixed and ice climbing as well.
