= Tamanend =

Chief of the Lenni-Lenape nation

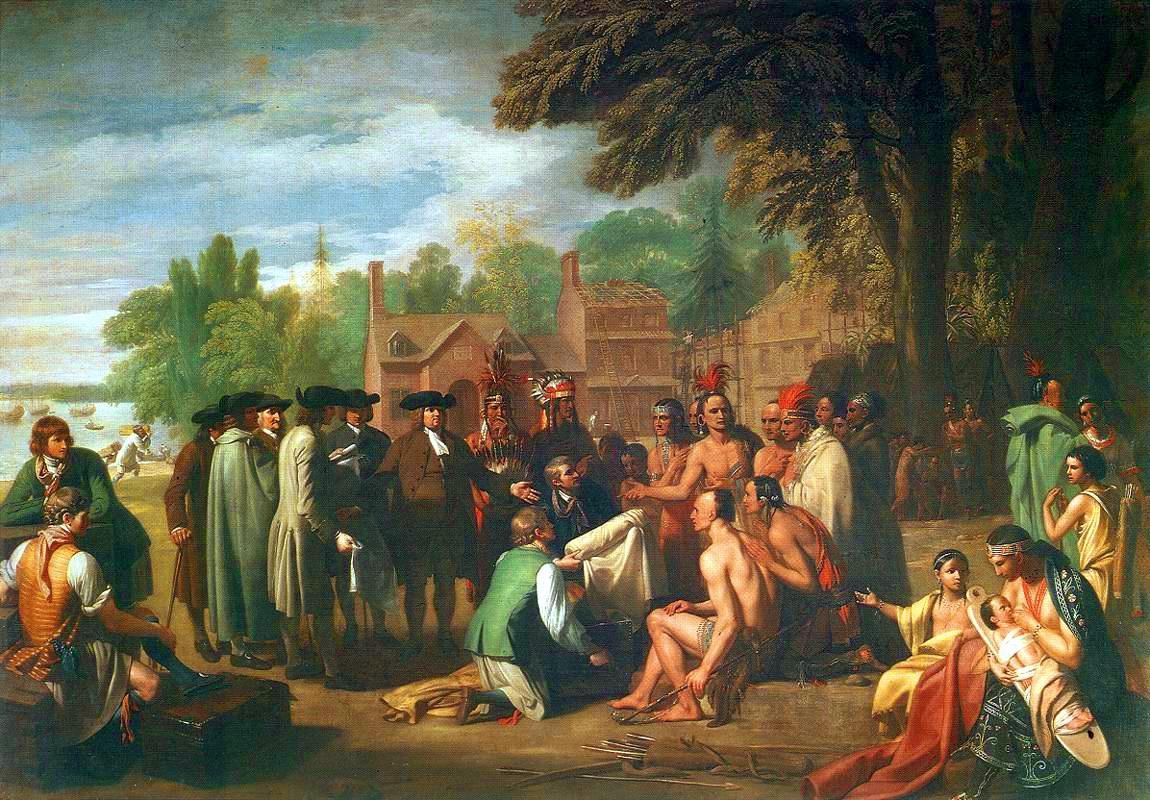
- The Treaty of Penn with the Indians by Benjamin West, depicting William Penn negotiating with Tamanend

Lenni-Lenape leader

Personal details
- Born: c. 1625 North America
- Died: c. 1701 (aged 75–76) North America

Tamanend ("the Affable"; c. 1625 – c. 1701), historically also known as Taminent, Tammany, Saint Tammany or King Tammany, was the Chief of Chiefs and Chief of the Turtle (Pùkuwànku) clan of the Lenni-Lenape nation in the Delaware Valley. He signed the founding peace treaty with William Penn.

Also called a "Patron Saint of America", Tamanend represented peace and amity, and became a popular figure in 18th-century America, especially in Philadelphia. A Tammany society founded in Philadelphia holds an annual Tammany festival. Tammany societies (Tammany Hall being the most well-known and influential) were established across the United States after the American Revolutionary War, and Tammany assumed mythic status as an icon for the peaceful politics of negotiation.

== Life and legend ==
Tamanend reputedly took part in a meeting between the leaders of the Lenni-Lenape nation and the leaders of the Pennsylvania colony held under a large elm tree at Shakamaxon in the early 1680s. William Penn and Tamanend continued to sign seven more documents assuring each other, and their peoples, of peaceable understanding after the initial one in 1683. Tamanend is recorded as having said that the Lenni-Lenape and the English colonists would "live in peace as long as the waters run in the rivers and creeks and as long as the stars and moon endure." These words have been memorialized on the statue of Tamanend that still stands in Philadelphia. It is believed that Tamanend died in 1701. Over the next century, many folk legends surrounded Tamanend, and his fame assumed mythical proportions among the people of Philadelphia, who began to call him "King Tammany", "Saint Tammany", and the "Patron Saint of America". The people of Philadelphia organized a Tammany society and an annual Tammany festival. These traditions soon spread across America. Tammany's popular status was partly due to the desire by colonists to express a distinct "American" identity, in place of their former European nationalities. Tammany provided an apt symbol for this kind of patriotism.

Because of Philadelphia's prominence during the American Revolution and subsequent decades, Tammany soon became a national symbol throughout much of the newly formed country.

Several of Tamanend's grandchildren became important Lenape chiefs and warriors, including Pisquetomen, Nenatcheehunt, Shingas and Tamaqua.

== Legacy ==
=== Tammany Societies ===
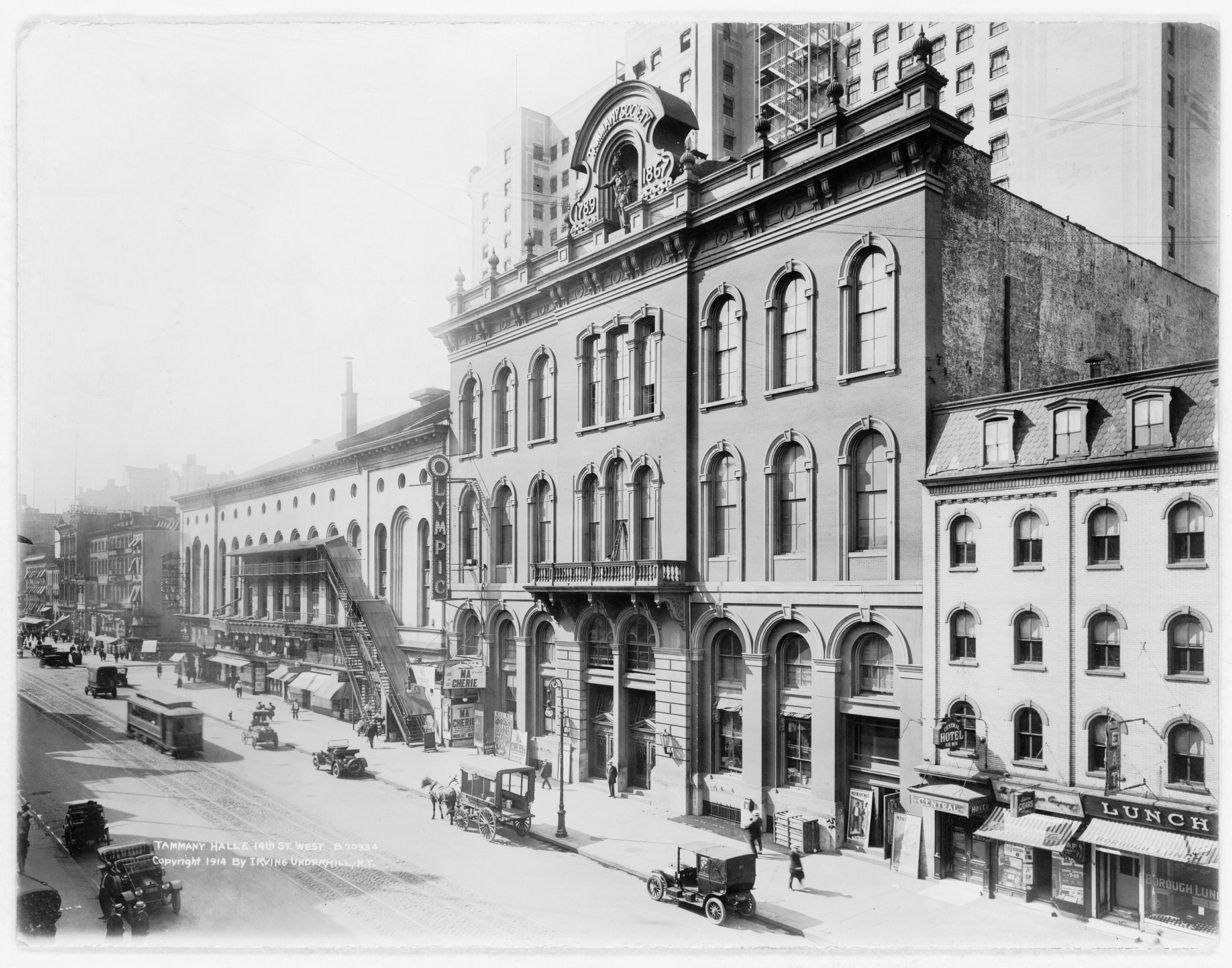
Tammany Hall on East 14th Street in Manhattan featured a white marble statue of Tamanend (located in the arch on top of the building).

In 1772, the original Tammany Society was formed in Philadelphia. It was called the "Sons of King Tammany" but was later renamed the "Sons of St. Tammany". Soon, Tammany societies were organized in communities from Georgia to Rhode Island, and west to the Ohio River. The most famous of these was New York City's Society of St. Tammany, whose members developed an influential political machine known as "Tammany Hall". A white marble statue of Tamanend adorned the façade of the building on East 14th Street that housed Tammany Hall.

=== Tammany Festivals ===
By the early 1770s, annual Tammany Festivals were being held in Philadelphia and Annapolis. The festivals were held on May 1, replacing the May Day traditions of Europe but continuing popular folk traditions. For example, the Saint Tammany Day celebrated on May 1, 1771, in Annapolis had a may pole decorated with ribbons. People danced in American Indian style to music while holding a ribbon and moving in a circle around the pole.

On May 1, 1777, John Adams wrote of the Tammany festival in Philadelphia during the American Revolutionary War. Adams, who was in Philadelphia attending the Second Continental Congress as a delegate from Massachusetts, wrote a letter home to his wife Abigail Adams, which said:

This is King Tammany's Day. Tammany was an Indian King, of this part of the Continent, when Mr. Penn first came here. His court was in this town. He was friendly to Mr. Penn and very serviceable to him. He lived here among the first settlers for some time and until old age. ... The people here have sainted him and keep his day.

On May 1, 1778, General George Washington and the Continental Army held a Tammany festival while camped at Valley Forge. The "men spent the day in mirth and jollity...in honor of King Tammany" (Military Journal of George Ewing, 1928).

After the end of the Revolutionary War, Tammany celebrations spread throughout the United States, including to Savannah, Georgia. Local societies promoted annual festivals, usually held on May 1. Tammany celebrations were such important events that, in 1785, George Washington appeared at the Tammany festival in Richmond, Virginia with Virginia governor Patrick Henry. The Tammany Society in New York City held its first festival in 1787.

Developments in 2003
In 2003, two identical concurrent resolutions were introduced in the United States Congress (Senate Concurrent Resolution 39 and House Concurrent Resolution 123) that sought to establish "St. Tammany Day" on May 1 as a national day of recognition. The Senate version was passed by unanimous consent. It was then referred for review in May 2003 to the Subcommittee on Civil Service and Agency Organization, which is a subcommittee of the House Committee on Government Reform. The Subcommittee took no action on the resolution, and it has not been reintroduced.

=== Dramatic and literary representations, and musical references ===
- In 1794, Ann Julia Hatton's opera, Tammany: The Indian Chief premiered on Broadway and became highly popular. It featured the first major opera libretto written in the United States that had an American theme, and it was the earliest drama about ethnic Americans. The opera premiered at the John Street Theatre, New York, on March 3, 1794, featuring English actress and 'grande dame' of American theatre, Charlotte Melmoth. Melmoth refused to speak the opera's epilogue, as she disapproved of its patriotic sentiments. The New York Journal called on the public to boycott the opera as long as Melmoth was still in the cast.
- In 1826, Tammany was featured (as "Tamenund") in the conclusion of The Last of the Mohicans (1826), a novel by James Fenimore Cooper which became extremely popular in the antebellum United States. The novel was part of his Leatherstocking Tales, a series of works that explored the colonial past, with strong influence on American literary culture and the emerging nation's identity. (Tamenund is depicted as elderly, and a relic of the past, but in 1757 — the year in which the novel is set — he was in fact more than half a century dead.)
- In 1912, James E. Gaffney, a member of New York's Tammany Hall, purchased the Boston Rustlers baseball team and renamed them the Boston Braves, using Tamanend's image as their primary logo.
- In 1932, Boston was granted an NFL franchise which took the Boston Braves name and image from its landlord at Braves Field. When the team moved to Fenway Park in 1936, it renamed itself the Redskins in homage to their new landlord, the Boston Red Sox. The Redskins name and Tamanend image travelled with them when they moved to Washington, D.C. in 1937. The team has since changed their name.
- A statue of an American Indian identified as Tamanend is shown outside Tammany Hall in the film Gangs of New York (2002).
- The musician Joanna Newsom, in the song "Sapokanikan" from her 2015 album Divers refers to both King Tamanend and Tammany Hall.
- Though not named in dialogue, Tamanend appears at the end of the 1992 film adaptation of The Last of The Mohicans, played by Mohawk actor Mike Phillips (though by the year that the film is set-1757-Tamanend had already been dead for over 50 years).

=== Statues, monuments, and memorials ===
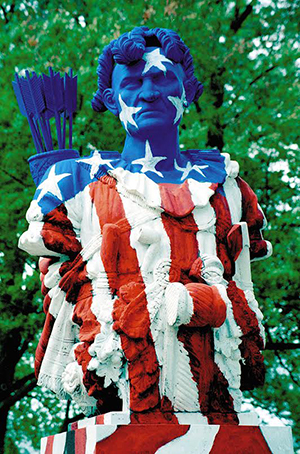
Statue of Tamanend at the U.S. Naval Academy

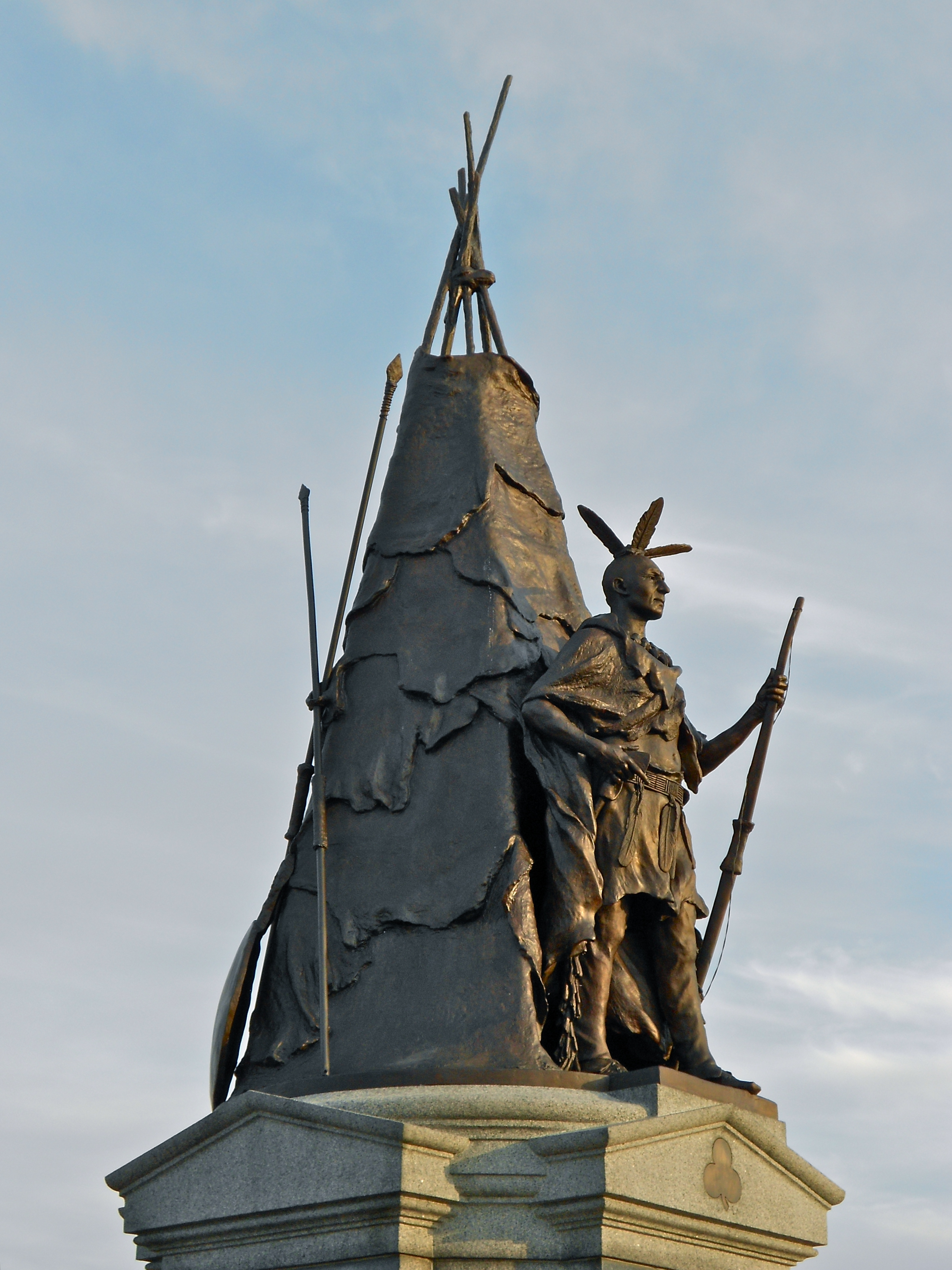
42nd New York Infantry Monument, Gettysburg Battlefield

- Tamanend, an 1817 wooden sculpture by William Luke, was the figurehead of the warship USS Delaware. The ship burned during the American Civil War, but the figurehead was rescued and put on display at the United States Naval Academy in Annapolis, Maryland. In the 1930s, a bronze replica was installed on campus in front of Bancroft Hall, where each day the Brigade of Midshipmen forms for Noon Meal Formation. One of the most cherished traditions at the academy is the painting of the statue in the days before football games or other prominent events. The original figurehead is in the U.S. Naval Academy Museum.
- Tamanend, a 1995 bronze statue by Raymond Sandoval, is located at the intersection of Front and Market Streets, in Philadelphia, Pennsylvania. The plaque notes that "Tamanend was considered the patron saint of America by the colonists prior to American Independence."

=== Namesakes ===
- St. Tammany Parish (established c. 1810) is one of nine Louisiana parishes (counties) named for "saints;" it is the only one whose namesake is not a Christian "saint" as recognized by the Roman Catholic Church.
- Mount Tammany is the name of the prominence on Kittatinny Mountain on the northeast (New Jersey) side of the Delaware Water Gap.
- "Tammany Regiment" was the nickname of the New York 42nd Infantry during the American Civil War. Its monument on the Gettysburg Battlefield includes an 1891 statue of Tamenend by John J. Boyle.
- Tamanend Middle School, Central Bucks School District, Pennsylvania, was named for him.
- Bracey, Virginia, was originally named St. Tammany.
- St. Tammany Masonic Lodge #5, was chartered in Hampton, Virginia in 1759.
- Todd Tamanend Clark, poet and composer, was born in 1952 in Greensboro, Pennsylvania.
- Tamanend's bottlenose dolphin, a species of dolphin inhabiting coastal waters along the eastern United States.

== See also ==
- List of peace activists
