= Delaware Water Gap =

Geological feature along the Delaware River

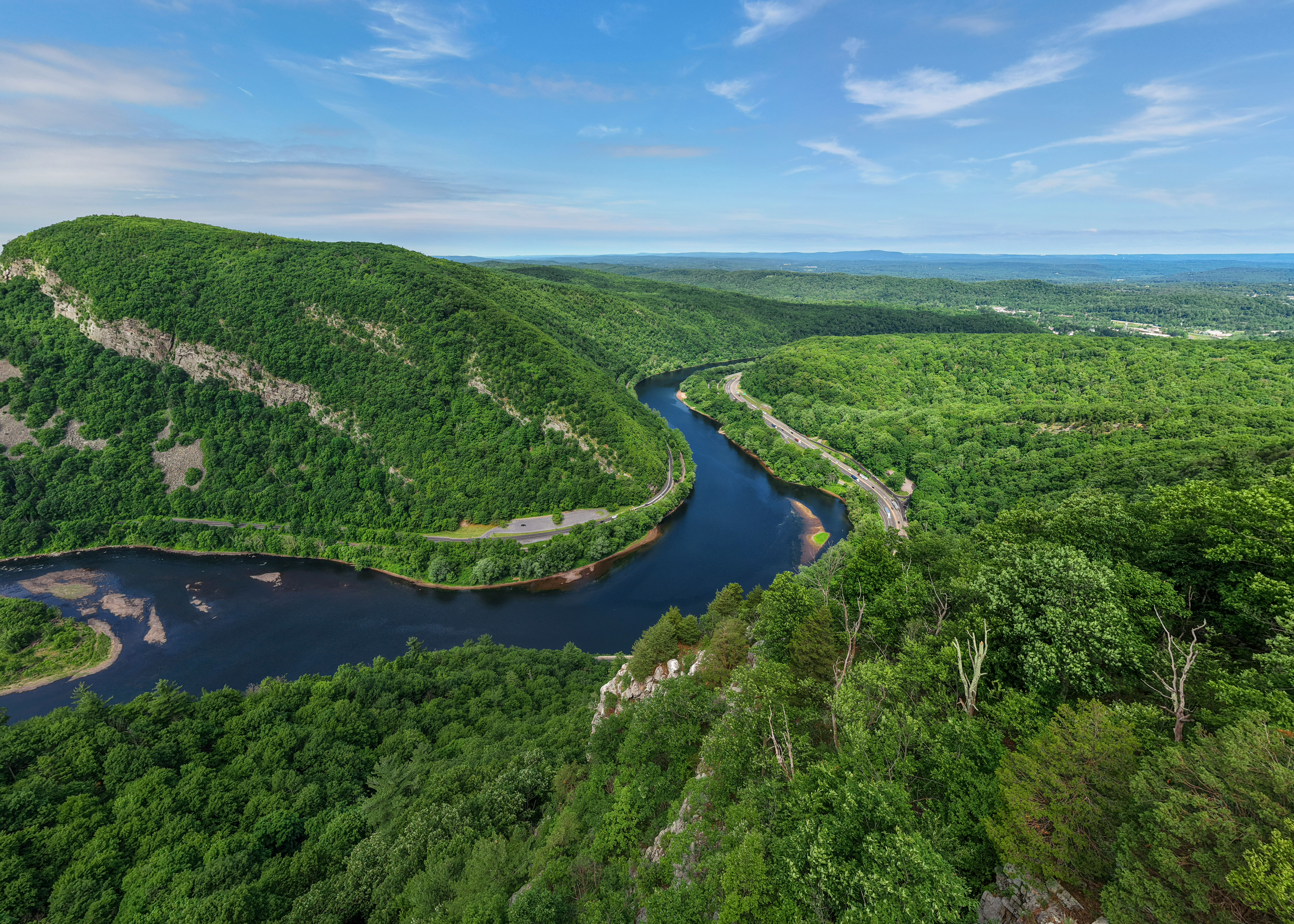
- Delaware Water Gap viewed from Mount Tammany in New Jersey, with the Delaware River below and Interstate 80 visible at right.
- Interactive map of Delaware Water Gap
- Elevation: 335 ft (102 m)
- Traversed by: I-80, PA 611, Delaware-Lackawanna Railroad

Location
- Location: New Jersey and Pennsylvania, U.S.
- Range: Blue Mountains/Kittatinny Ridge
- Coordinates: 40°58′3.7″N 75°7′11.6″W
- Topo map: Portland, Stroudsburg

The Delaware Water Gap is a water gap on the border between the U.S. states of New Jersey and Pennsylvania, southeast of Stroudsburg, where the Delaware River cuts through a large ridge of the Appalachian Mountains.

The gap is at the southern end of the Delaware Water Gap National Recreation Area, which offers canoeing, fishing, hiking, and rock climbing. Though the US National Park Service manages the National Recreation Area, portions of the water gap are also patrolled by the New Jersey Division of Parks and Forestry.

The park does not charge an entrance fee but does have fees for additional amenities, including vehicle season and daily passes, boat rentals, and beach use. Most of the park is open 24 hours a day, with most day-use areas within the park (such as trailhead parking lots, Millbrook Village, and all picnic areas) open sunrise to sunset.

The borough of Delaware Water Gap, Pennsylvania, is located just north of the pass itself.

== Geology ==
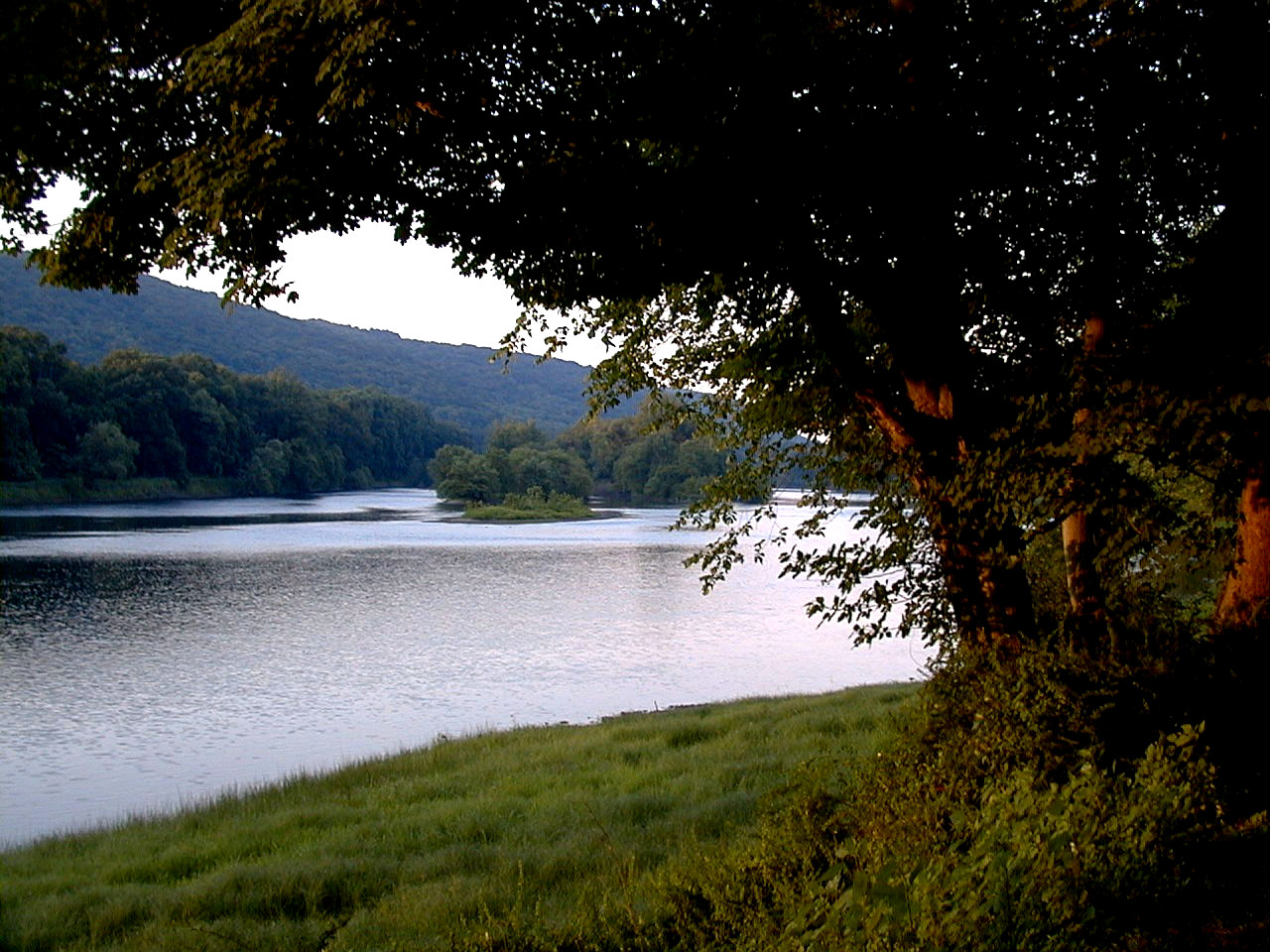
Worthington State Forest seen from a campsite

Delaware Water Gap viewed from Mount Minsi

A water gap is a geological feature where a river cuts through a mountain ridge. The Delaware Water Gap formed 500 million years ago when quartz pebbles from mountains in the area were deposited in a shallow sea. The Martinsburg Shale on the eastern side of what was to be Kittatinny Mountain was uplifted 450 million years ago when a chain of volcanic islands collided with proto-North America. These islands slid over the North American plate, and deposited rock on top of the plate, forming the Highlands and Kittatinny Valley.

About 400 million years ago, a small continent collided with proto-North America. The heat from the pressure melted the quartzite, which allowed it to bend the quartz pebbles. This layer was then uplifted and cracked over thousands of years. During this period, the Delaware River slowly cut its path down through the shattered and cracked quartzite. If the quartzite had not been cracked, the river would not have been able to cut its path through the mountain to form the gap.

Millions of years of rain, ice, snow, and wind erosion shaped the area. The Wisconsin glaciation, which occurred between 21,000 BCE and 13,000 BCE, covered the entire Kittatinny Ridge, with its edge near present-day Belvidere, New Jersey. When the glaciers retreated, the existing gap assumed its present form.

The mountain is composed of Silurian shawangunk conglomerate. This is gray quartzite, which makes the mountain highly resistant to weathering. The Silurian High Fall formation of sandstone is on the western side of the gap near the base. The eastern side of the gap has Ordovician Martinsburg shale. Sedimentary rock is along the river. The Bloomsburg Red Beds, a red shale, are at the gap under Dunnfield Creek.

The Delaware Water Gap is nearly 1,300 feet (400 m) wide at river level and about 1 mile (1.6 km) wide from the top of Mt. Tammany to the top of Mt. Minsi. It is more than 1,200 feet (370 m) from mountaintop to the river surface. The river through the gap is 290 feet (88 m) above sea level.

The ridge of the Appalachians that the Delaware River crosses is called the Blue Mountains in Pennsylvania and Kittatinny in New Jersey. It is the first major ridge of the Appalachian mountains. New Jersey's mountain is Mount Tammany, named after the Lenni-Lenape Chief Tamanend. The summit of Tammany is 1,540 ft (470 m) above sea level. The Pennsylvania mountain is Mount Minsi, named after a Native American tribe in the area.

== Flora and fauna ==
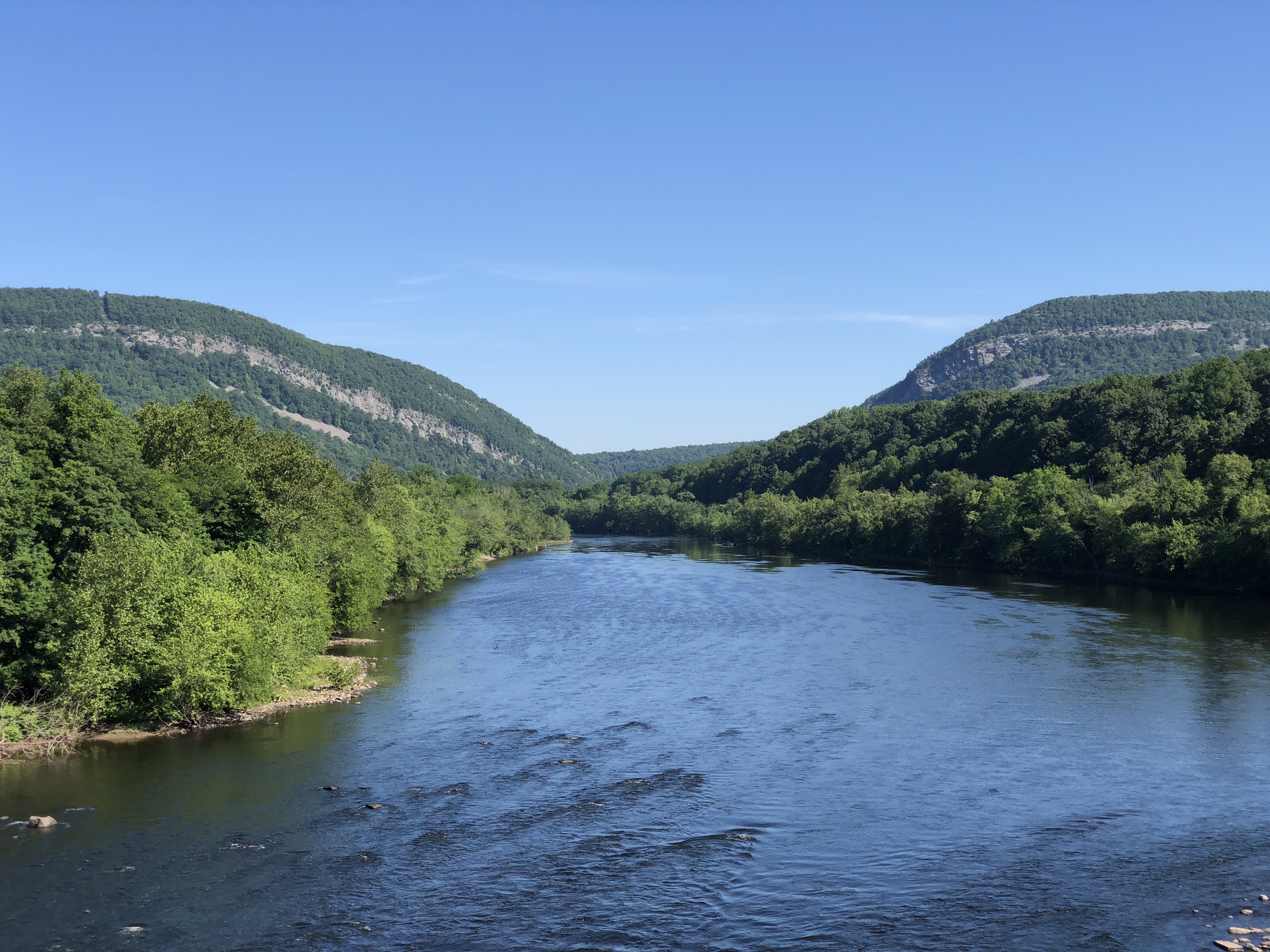
Delaware Water Gap seen from the Delaware River Viaduct in Knowlton Township, New Jersey in June 2021

In 1739, America's first botanist, John Bartram of Philadelphia, followed the course of the Delaware River in his search for American trees, evergreens and shrubs to supply new species that were formerly unknown to British naturalists. These gardeners waited months for shipments of saplings, seeds, and pinecones to be sent by sea, which were then introduced into English gardens. Using Native American trails, Bartram rode on horseback through the Water Gap, which allowed entry to the lands beyond.

A northern deciduous forest cloaks the slopes of the Delaware Water Gap. Hardwood species composing the forest include various oaks, hickories, maples, ash, elm, cherry, walnut, birch, sycamore, and beech. Coniferous species include Eastern White Pine, Pitch Pine, Eastern Red Cedar, and Eastern Hemlock.

Black bear, white-tailed deer, gray squirrels, red squirrels, raccoons, gray fox, fisher, and chipmunks are some of the forest species of the area. Hunting of deer, turkey, and small game is permitted, following NJ Fish & Wildlife regulations, but is not permitted at any of the campsites. A 2018 survey documented eastern small-footed bats within the Delaware Water Gap National Recreation Area.

More than 260 species of birds have been observed in the area. Peregrine Falcons historically nested in the Milford Cliffs, first being reported in the 1940s and 1950s. In 2018, the first time in about 70 years, two peregrine falcon chicks hatched from a nesting pair, and were banded.

Shad migrate up the river through the gap in the spring. Other fish include bass, trout, carp, and walleye. Dunnfield Creek has been designated a "Wild Trout Stream" because of its natural brook trout fishery.

Timber rattlesnakes and copperheads also inhabit the rocky areas of the mountain. Salamanders are found in the moist areas of the forest. Eastern prickly pear cactus also grows on the mountain near the red dot trail on the south eastern facing slope halfway up the mountain.

== Transportation ==
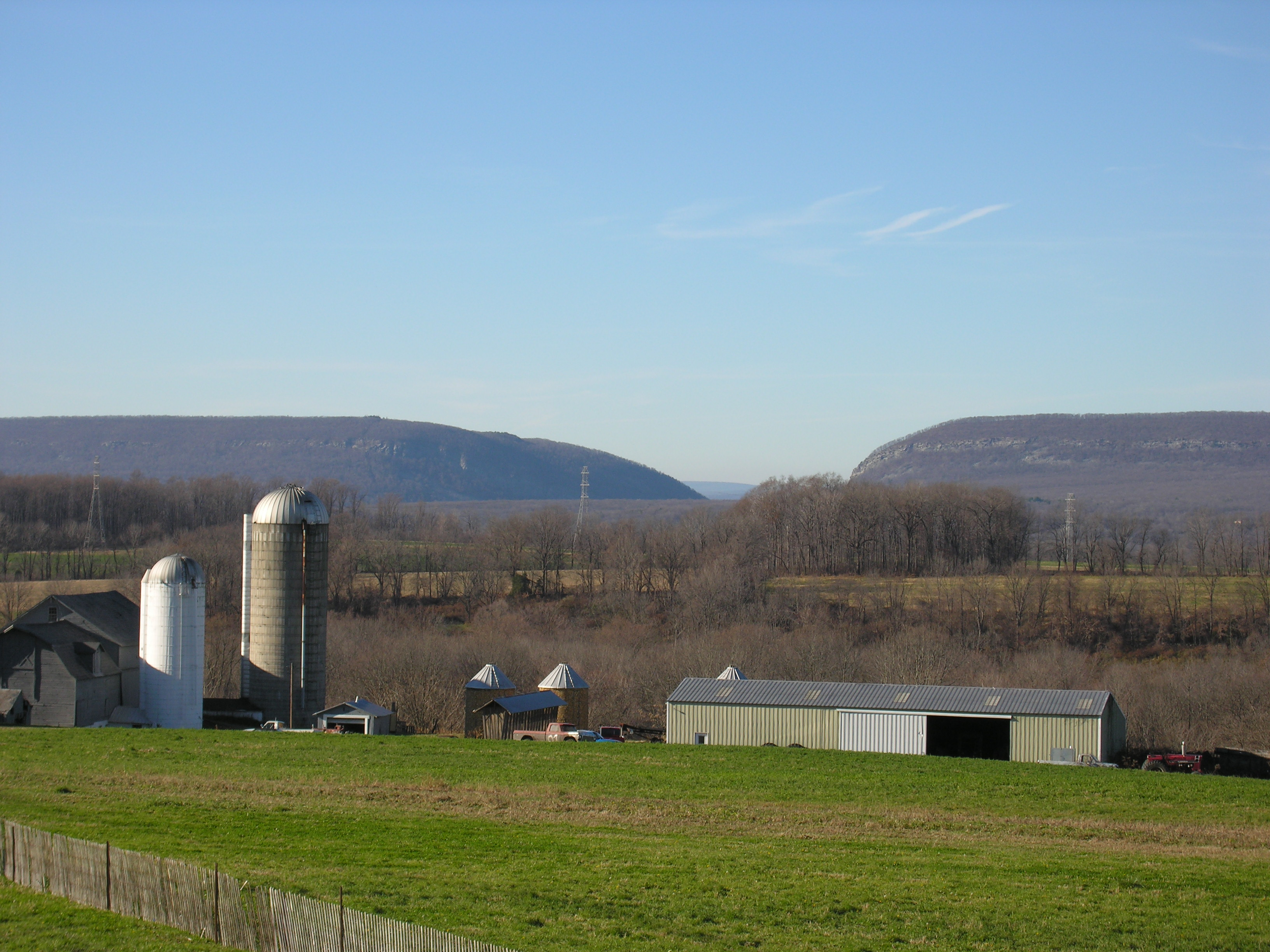
Delaware Water Gap as seen from Knowlton Township, New Jersey in Warren County

Steep rock walls prevented foot travel through the gap until a road was built on the Pennsylvania side of the river in 1793. In 1830, a road was built on the New Jersey side through the gap and north toward Pahaquarry. Interstate 80 passes through the gap on the New Jersey side as of the early 1970s via the Delaware Water Gap Toll Bridge, occupying the former right-of-way of the New York, Susquehanna and Western Railway.

The Pennsylvania portion of the New Jersey Cut-Off mainline of the Delaware, Lackawanna and Western Railroad comes into Slateford, Pennsylvania. The Pennsylvania Northeast Regional Railroad Authority owns the trackage in the Water Gap area. The Delaware-Lackawanna Railroad operates the lines that run through the gap. Pennsylvania Route 611 occupies the right-of-way of a former trolley line.

Martz Trailways has a bus station in the town of Delaware Water Gap. There are also numerous jitneys that stop there on their routes between New York City and towns further away such as Hazleton, Wilkes-Barre, and Scranton.

== Tocks Island and the National Park Service ==
In 1962, the Congress authorized the building of a dam across the Delaware River at Tocks Island, upstream of the water gap. Meant to control hurricane-related flooding, it was never built. The land for the proposed reservoir, which had already been purchased, was used to create the Delaware Water Gap National Recreation Area in 1965.

There are two visitor centers, one in New Jersey near the Delaware River bridge and the other in Dingmans Ferry, Pennsylvania. Headquarters is located on River Road in Pennsylvania. The New Jersey side of the gap is also protected within Worthington State Forest, a forest wholly contained within the recreation area.

== Hiking trails ==
Trail	Length (one-way)	Elevation Change	Difficulty	Blaze
Mt. Tammany	1.2 miles (1.9 km)	1,201 feet (366 m)	Difficult	Red
Pahaquarry	1.7 miles (2.7 km)	1,201 feet (366 m)	Difficult	Blue
Dunnfield Creek	3.5 miles (5.6 km)	966 feet (294 m)	Moderate	Green

=== Mount Tammany Trail ===
One of two trails that climb 1,200 vertical feet to the summit of Mt. Tammany, where one can see Mt. Minsi in Pennsylvania on the other side of the gap.

=== Pahaquarry Trail ===
The other trail to the top of Mt. Tammany. The most challenging hike in the park is to combine the Red Dot and Blue Blaze trails into a 3-mile (5 km) loop. Park Services suggest ascending the Red Dot and descending the Blue Blaze, which is less steep.

=== Dunnfield Creek Trail ===
Dunnfield Creek Trail leaves the Appalachian Trail above the Delaware River, follows the creek for two-thirds of its length with numerous stream crossings, then climbs a ravine to rejoin the Appalachian Trail at Sunfish Pond.

=== Appalachian Trail ===
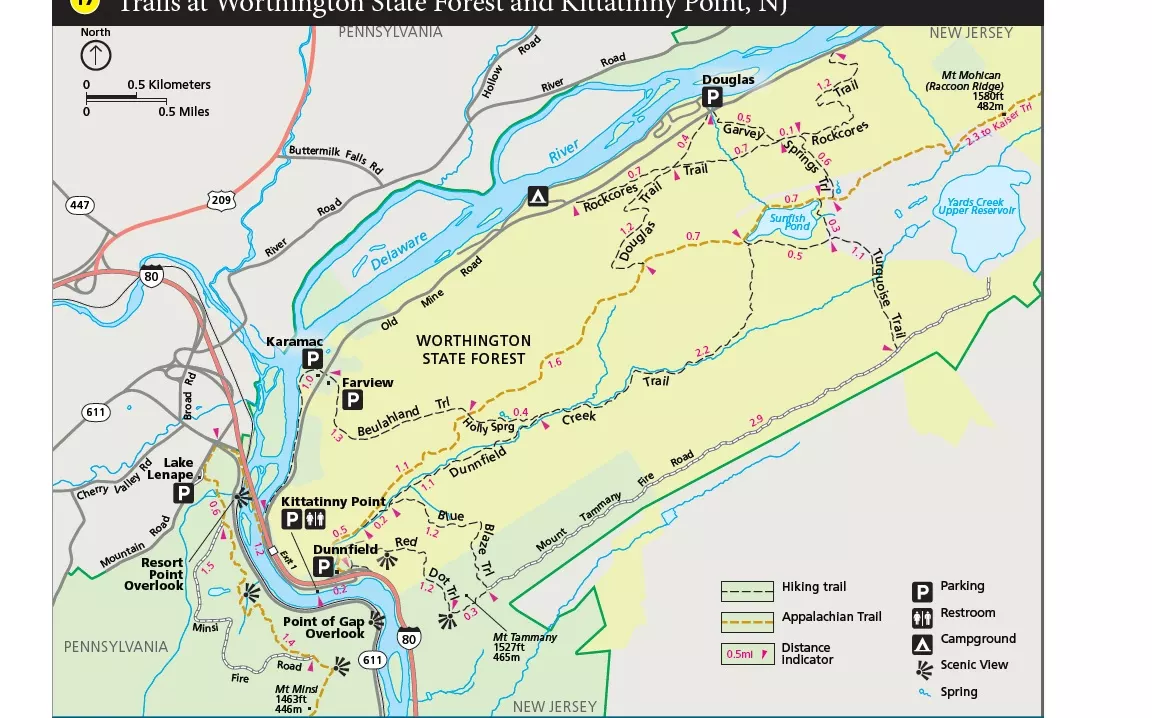
The trails at Mt. Tammany near Kittatinny Point, NJ

Running from Springer Mountain, Georgia, to Mt. Katahdin in Baxter State Park, Maine, the Appalachian Trail enters the Delaware Water Gap at the Delaware River on the Route 80 Bridge. It goes to Sunfish Pond, and continues northeast to Stokes State Forest. The trail crosses Route 206 and continues along the ridgeline of the Kittatinny Mountains to High Point State Park, eventually entering New York. Of the 2,174 miles (3,499 km) of trail, 28 miles (45 km) are within the Delaware Water Gap National Recreation Area.

Additional trails also traverse through the area.

== Rock climbing ==
The gap is a popular place to rock-climb in New Jersey. The climbs are 150 to 300 ft (46 to 91 m). Most climbing is done on the New Jersey side due to easier access. There are about 100 climbs on the New Jersey side, which range in difficulty from 5.1 to 5.14 on the Yosemite Decimal System scale. Climbers follow the gray dot trail along Route 80, pass the large rock face, then go up the path to the route they choose.

Since 2010, the Pennsylvania side has been closed to climbing during the nesting season of the endangered peregrine falcons.

== Boy Scout camps ==
The Easton Area Council of the Boy Scouts of America operated Weygadt Scout Reservation at the base of Mount Tammany from 1931 until 1968. The Reservation was originally home to two Scout camps—the Easton Council's Camp Weygadt on the southern part of the reservation and the Minsi Trails Council's Camp Minsi on the northern section of the reservation. In the later part of the 1930s, the Bethlehem Council moved their camp to the Poconos, and the entire reservation in the Water Gap became Camp Weygadt. Camp Minsi is now located in Pocono Summit, Pennsylvania, on the shores of Stillwater Lake.

Pahaquarra Boy Scout Camp was located on the New Jersey side of the Delaware Water Gap on Old Mine Road at the abandoned Pahaquarry Copper Mine. The camp served Scouts from the George Washington Council. Just north of this camp was Camp Cowaw Boy Scout Camp, which served Raritan Council Boy Scouts.

== See also ==
- Mount Tammany Fire Road
- Delaware Water Gap National Recreation Area
