= Tamanend (sculpture) =

Statue at the United States Naval Academy in Annapolis, Maryland

Tamanend, Chief of Delaware Indians
- Tamanend
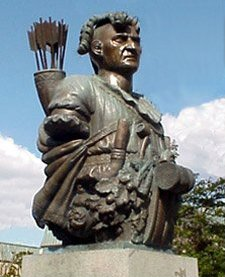
- Artist: William Luke (1790-1839)
- Year: 1817
- Type: sculpture
- Medium: wood, then bronze
- Subject: Figurehead of the USS Delaware
- Dimensions: 2.4 m × 1.5 m × 1.2 m (96 in × 59 in × 46 in)
- Location: United States Naval Academy; Annapolis, MD; 38°58′56″N 76°29′02″W
- Owner: United States Naval Academy
- Accession: June 1930

Tamanend was honored as the figurehead of USS Delaware in a carving by William Luke. Tamanend the “affable” (c. 1628–1698) was a chief of one of the clans that made up the Lenni-Lenape nation in the Delaware Valley. He is best known as a lover of peace and friendship who played a prominent role in the establishment of peaceful relations among the Native American tribes and the English settlers who established Pennsylvania, led by William Penn.

The USS Delaware was burned in 1861 at the Gosport Navy Yard to prevent Confederate capture at the start of the Civil War. In 1866, the salvaged figurehead was transferred to the United States Naval Academy and placed on a pedestal facing Bancroft Hall, the Naval Academy's dormitory that is said to be the largest dormitory in the United States, and is flanked by Stribling Walk on both sides.

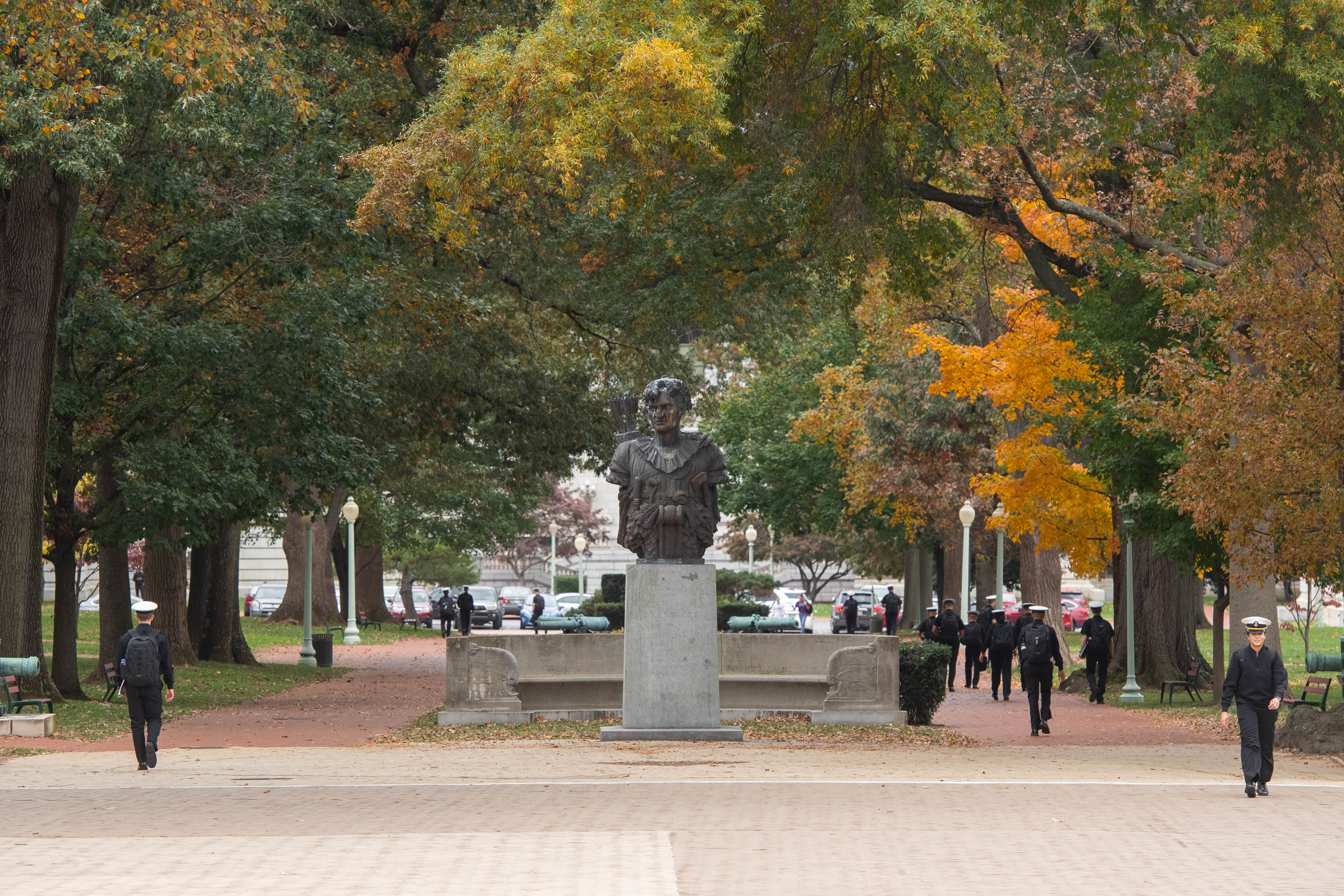
Tamanend Figurehead Statue at USNA

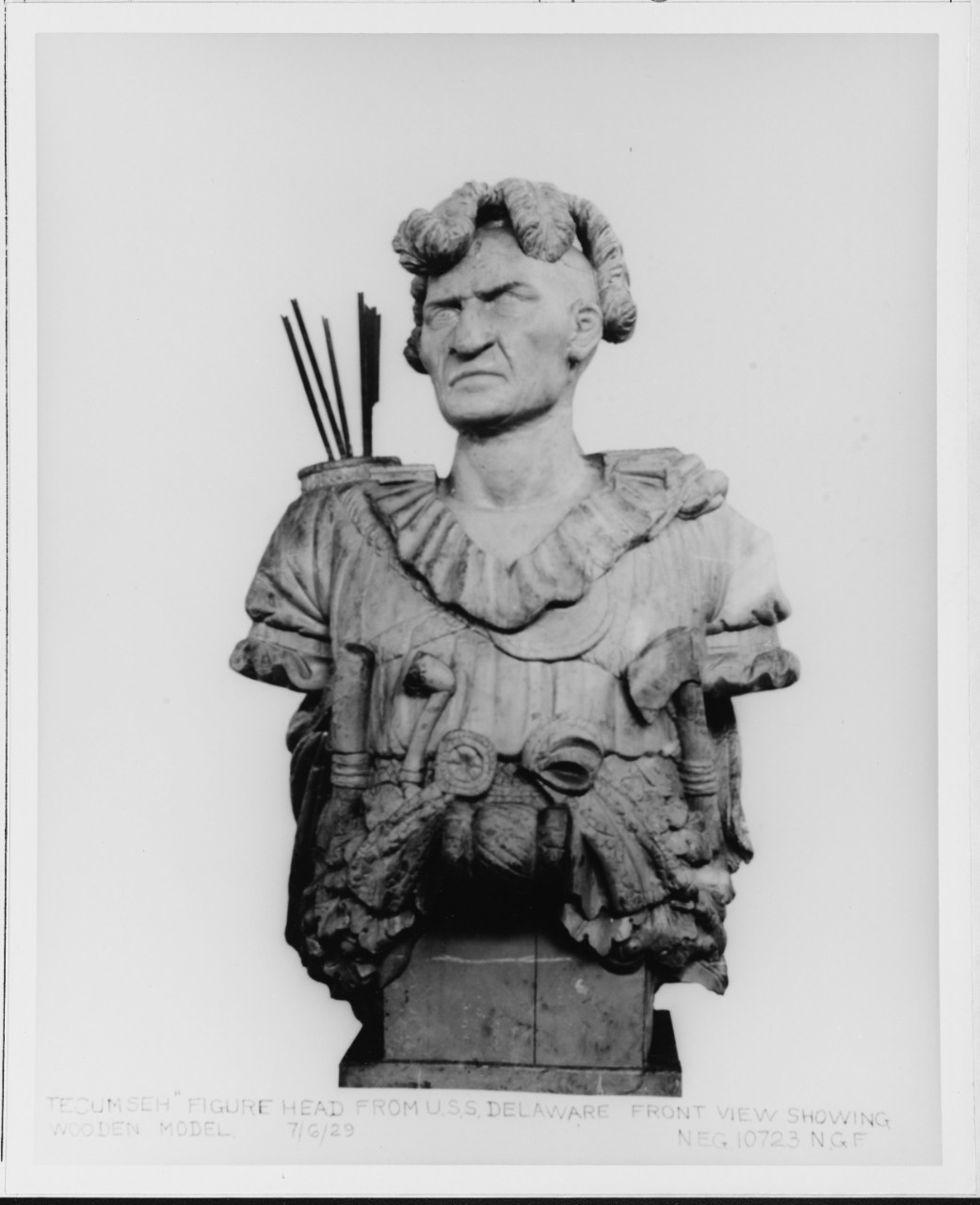
Front view of the original wooden figurehead of Tamanend, 1929

For 40 years, the wooden figurehead kept its vigil in the Yard until the weather began to take its toll. In 1906 repairs using cement, putty, and paint temporarily removed the signs of age. When the ravages of the elements again threatened, the Class of 1891 had the statue cast in bronze and presented it to the Brigade of Midshipmen and Naval Academy. The task of restoration was accomplished at the U.S. Naval Gun Factory.

== Description ==
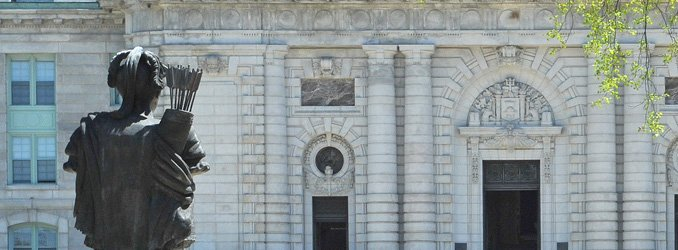
The statue of Tamanend at the US Naval Academy facing Bancroft Hall

The statue is positioned on a base of Vermont marble and measures 96 by 59 by 46 inches (2.4 m × 1.5 m × 1.2 m). The area between the figurehead and Bancroft Hall is called T-Court. In 1930, the wooden "heart" and "brains" of the original statue were transferred to the bronze statue.

== Inscriptions ==
On the front base of the statue:

FIGUREHEAD

OF THE
USS
DELAWARE
1817
BRONZE REPLICA
GIFT OF THE
CLASS OF 1891

On the statue's bronze base, to the rear:

U.S. Naval Gun Factory

Navy Yard Washington, D.C.
1929
