= Worthington State Forest =

State forest in New Jersey

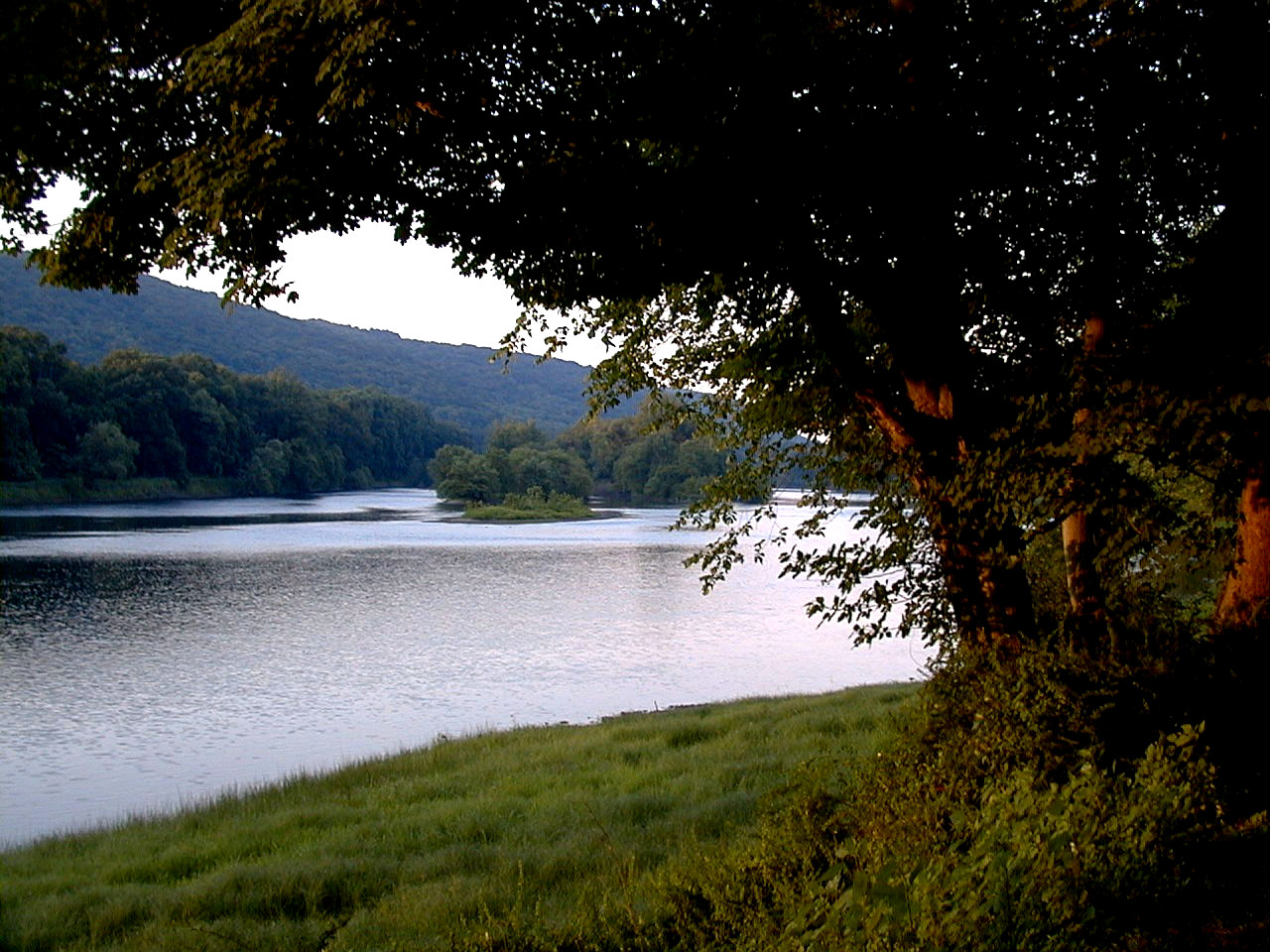
- View of Worthington State Forest from a campsite in June 2004

- Location within New Jersey Location within the United States
- Location: Warren County
- Coordinates: 40°59′36″N 75°05′08″W
- Area: 6,660-acre (27.0 km^{2})
- Opened: 1954
- Operator: New Jersey Division of Parks and Forestry
- Website: Official website

Worthington State Forest is a state forest located in Warren County, New Jersey within the Delaware Water Gap National Recreation Area, just north of the water gap in the Skylands Region of the state. It covers an area of 6,660 acres (27.0 km^{2}) and stretches for more than 7 miles (11 km) along the Kittatinny Ridge near Columbia.

The park offers hiking, camping (including a hike-in, primitive area) and canoeing and kayaking on the Delaware River. There are nearly 20 miles (32 km) of hiking trails within the park, including 7 miles (11 km) of the Appalachian Trail, which passes through the park. The park is operated and maintained by the New Jersey Division of Parks and Forestry.

== History ==
The forest is named after Charles Campbell Worthington, who, throughout the late 1800s, purchased 6,000 acres (24 km^{2}) of land of both sides of the river, including parts of Mount Tammany. His intent was to create one of the premier deer hunting preserves in the county. He would name this estate Buckwood Park.

He built Buckwood Lodge, a small mansion on the side of Kittatinny Ridge, between the river and Sunfish Pond, a small lake higher up the ridge covering 258 acres (1.04 km^{2}). Worthington gave Sunfish Pond the name of Buckwood Lake, and used it as a water supply for his lodge.

The Old Mine Road, one of the earliest roads in the area, runs along the Delaware; it was used for transporting copper and slate from nearby mines and quarries, and is believed to have originally been a Native American trail that saw use by fur traders and Dutch settlers.

== Area ==
The forest includes the 1,085 acres (4.39 km^{2}) Dunnfield Creek Natural Area; the creek is designated a wild trout stream. The 258 acres (1.04 km^{2}) Sunfish Pond Natural Area consists of a glacial lake and the surrounding chestnut oak forest, and can be reached by a steep and rocky climb along the Appalachian Trail. At 1,527 feet (465 m), Mount Tammany offers a view of the Delaware Water Gap.

== See also ==
- Appalachian Trail by state
- Mount Tammany Fire Road
- Pahaquarry Copper Mine
