= Mount Tammany =

Mountain in New Jersey, United States

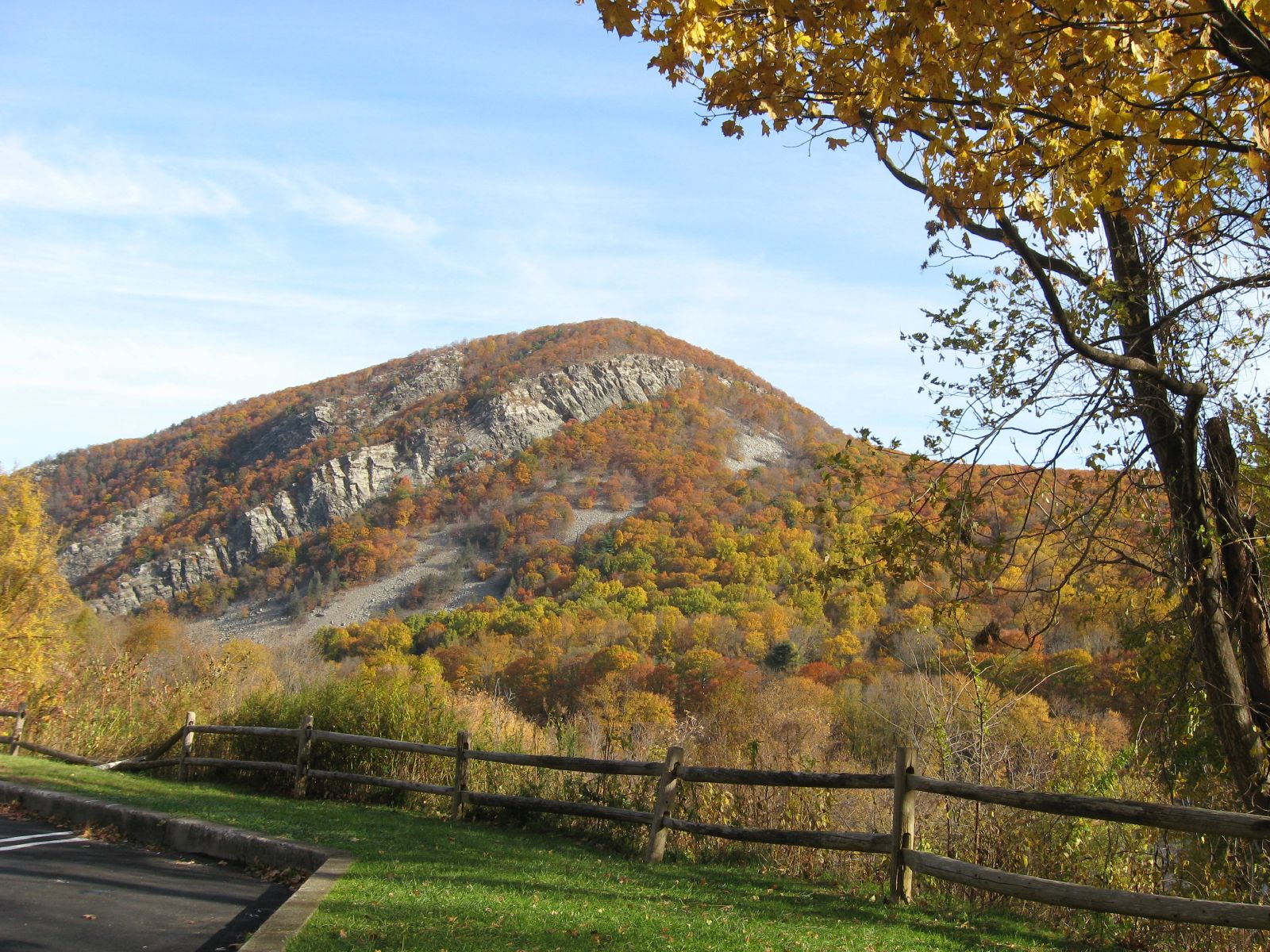
- Mount Tammany 's south face, November 2008

Highest point
- Elevation: 1,527 ft (465 m)
- Coordinates: 40°58′09″N 75°06′41″W

Geography
- Location within Warren County, New Jersey
- Location: Delaware Water Gap, Warren County, New Jersey, U.S.
- Parent range: Kittatinny Mountains
- Topo map: USGS Portland

Climbing
- Easiest route: Mount Tammany Trail ascending the western slopes from the Dunnfield Creek trailhead (hike)

Mount Tammany is the southernmost peak of the Kittatinny Mountains, in Knowlton Township, Warren County, New Jersey, United States. It is 1,526 feet (465 m) tall, and forms the east side of the Delaware Water Gap. Across the Gap is Mount Minsi, on the Pennsylvania side of the river. The mountain is named after the Lenni Lenape chief Tamanend. It lies along the Appalachian Trail in Worthington State Forest. The summit can be hiked by the Mount Tammany Trail ascending the western slopes. The trailhead is accessible from Interstate 80, with two parking lots (an Appalachian Trailhead lot and auxiliary lot).

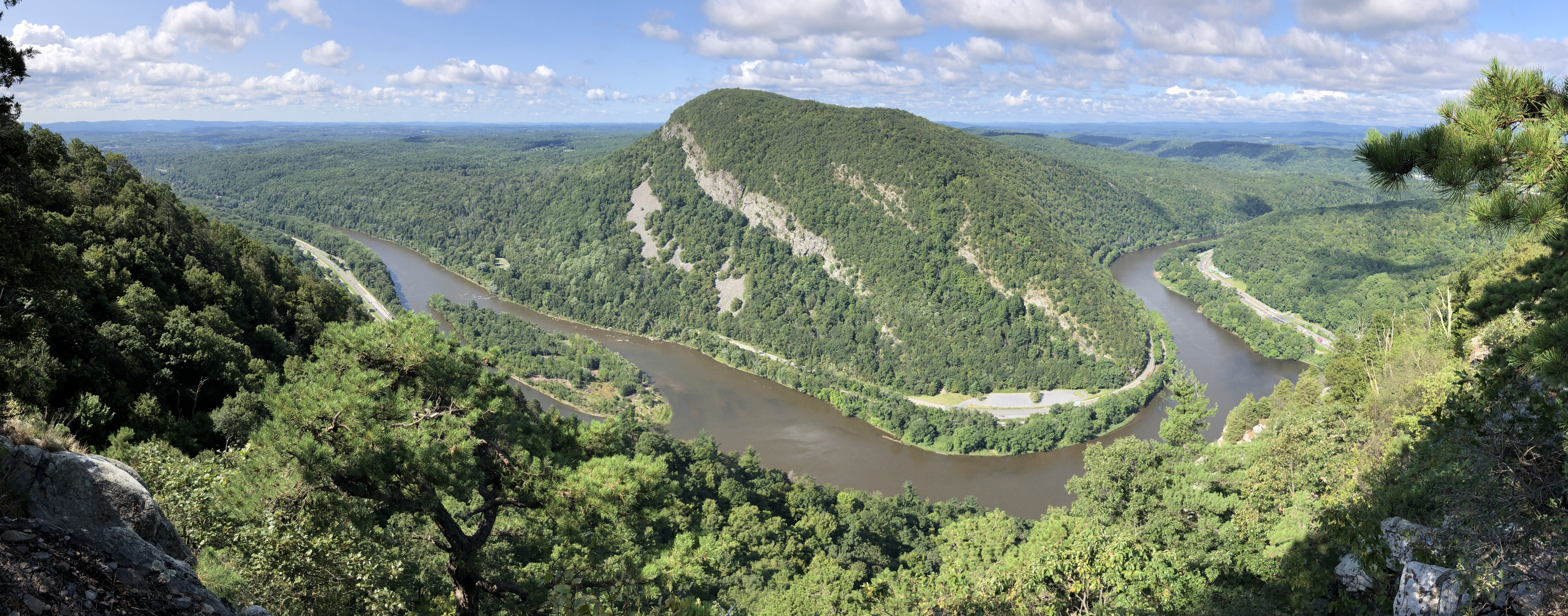
View from the overlook near the summit of Mount Tammany

== Trails and hiking ==
Hiking on Mount Tammany consists of two trails: the Red Dot Trail and the Blue Dot Trail. The Red Dot Trail is 1.2 miles (one-way) and the Blue Dot Trail is 1.8 miles (one-way). Both trails can be combined into a 3 mile loop with the ascent on the Red Dot Trail and the descent on the Blue Dot Trail. There is a 1201 feet elevation change going up and down the mountain. Generally, this is considered a challenging trail with an average completion time of 2 hours 20 minutes. Climbing up the trail also requires scrambling and physical climbing at some points along the trail.
