= Pleasant Valley Historic District =

Pleasant Valley Historic District may refer to:

- Pleasant Valley Historic District (Crandall, Georgia), listed on the National Register of Historic Places in Murray County, Georgia
- Pleasant Valley Historic District (Mercer County, New Jersey), listed on the National Register of Historic Places in Hunterdon County and in Mercer County, New Jersey
- Pleasant Valley Historic District (Warren County, New Jersey), listed on the National Register of Historic Places in Warren County, New Jersey
