= Washington Township, Warren County, New Jersey =

Township in Warren County, New Jersey, US

Washington Township, New Jersey
- Township
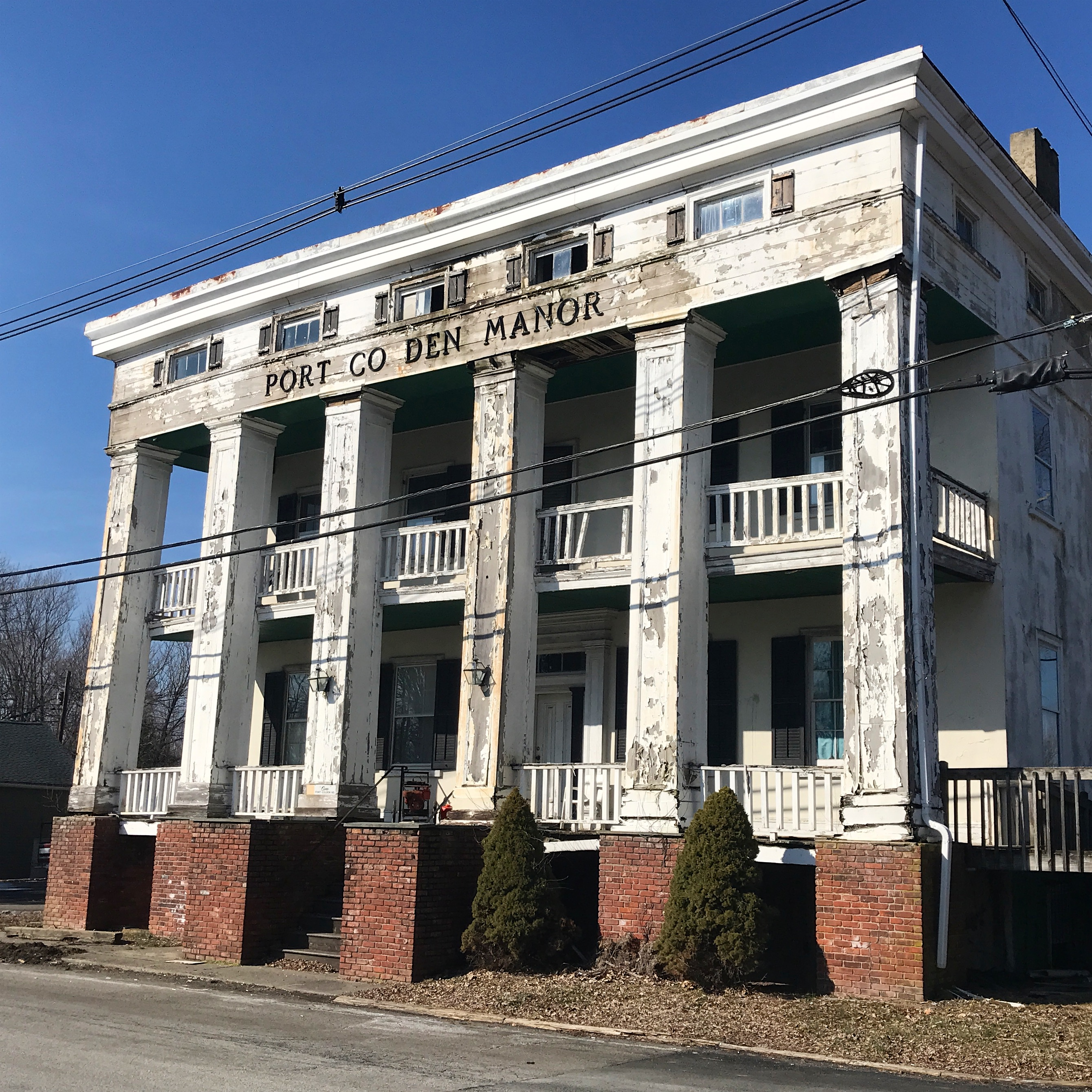
- Port Colden Manor in Port Colden Historic District

- Seal

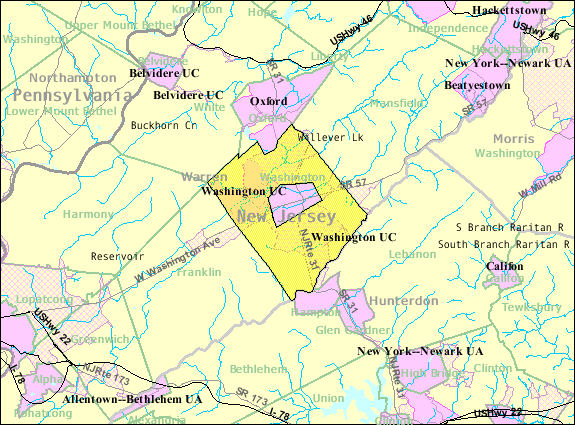
- Census Bureau map of Washington Township, Warren County, New Jersey

- Location in Warren County Location in New Jersey Location in the United States
- Coordinates: 40.729957°N 74.958975°W
- Country: United States
- State: New Jersey
- County: Warren
- Incorporated: April 9, 1849
- Named for: George Washington

Government
  - Type: Township
  - Body: Township Committee
  - Mayor: Robert J. Klingel (R, term ends December 31, 2023)
  - Administrator: Peter H. deBoer Jr.
  - Municipal clerk: Ann Kilduff

Area
  - Total: 18.05 sq mi (46.75 km^{2})
  - Land: 17.96 sq mi (46.52 km^{2})
  - Water: 0.089 sq mi (0.23 km^{2}) 0.49%
  - Rank: 156th of 565 in state 12th of 22 in county
- Elevation: 456 ft (139 m)

Population (2020)
  - Total: 6,492
  - Estimate (2024): 6,927
  - Rank: 328th of 565 in state 6th of 22 in county
  - Density: 361.5/sq mi (139.6/km^{2})
  - Rank: 463rd of 565 in state 9th of 22 in county
- Time zone: UTC−05:00 (Eastern (EST))
  - Summer (DST): UTC−04:00 (Eastern (EDT))
- ZIP Code: 07882
- Area code: 908 exchanges: 689, 835
- FIPS code: 3404177300
- GNIS feature ID: 0882250
- Website: www.washington-twp-warren.org

Washington Township is a township in Warren County, in the U.S. state of New Jersey. As of the 2020 United States census, the township's population was 6,492, a decrease of 159 (−2.4%) from the 2010 census count of 6,651, which in turn reflected an increase of 403 (+6.5%) from the 6,248 counted in the 2000 census.

The township is one of six municipalities in New Jersey under the name Washington (one of which is a borough, five of which are townships). Washington Township, Warren County completely surrounds the borough of Washington. Mansfield Township, also in Warren County, borders both this municipality and another Washington Township in Morris County.

Washington Township was incorporated as a township by an act of the New Jersey Legislature on April 9, 1849, from portions of Mansfield Township. Portions of the township were taken on February 20, 1868, to create Washington Borough. The township was named for George Washington, one of more than ten communities statewide named for the first president. It is one of five municipalities in the state of New Jersey with the name "Washington Township". Another municipality, Washington Borough, is completely surrounded by Washington Township.

== Geography ==
According to the United States Census Bureau, the township had a total area of 18.05 square miles (46.75 km^{2}), including 17.96 square miles (46.52 km^{2}) of land and 0.09 square miles (0.23 km^{2}) of water (0.49%).

Brass Castle (with a 2020 Census population of 1,536) and Port Colden (260) are unincorporated communities and census-designated places (CDPs) located within the township.

Other unincorporated communities, localities and place names located partially or completely within the township include Bowerstown, Butlers Park, Changewater, Fort Golden, Imlaydale, and Pleasant Valley.

Washington Township borders the municipalities of Franklin Township, Mansfield Township, Oxford Township and White Township in Warren County; and Bethlehem Township, Hampton and Lebanon Township in Hunterdon County. The borough of Washington is completely surrounded by Washington Township, making it part of 21 pairs of "doughnut towns" in the state, where one municipality entirely surrounds another.

== Demographics ==
Historical population
Census	Pop.	Note	%±
1850	1,567		—
1860	2,634		68.1%
1870	2,160	*	−18.0%
1880	1,452		−32.8%
1890	1,304		−10.2%
1900	1,249		−4.2%
1910	1,023		−18.1%
1920	1,004		−1.9%
1930	1,007		0.3%
1940	1,320		31.1%
1950	1,765		33.7%
1960	3,055		73.1%
1970	3,585		17.3%
1980	4,243		18.4%
1990	5,367		26.5%
2000	6,248		16.4%
2010	6,651		6.5%
2020	6,492		−2.4%
2024 (est.)	6,927		6.7%
Population sources: 1850–1920; 1850–1870 1850 1870; 1880–1890 1890–1910; 1910–1930 1940–2000; 2000 2010 2020 * = Lost territory in previous decade

The township's economic data (as is all of Warren County) is calculated by the US Census Bureau as part of the Lehigh Valley / Allentown-Bethlehem-Easton, PA-NJ Metropolitan Statistical Area.

=== 2010 census ===
The 2010 United States census counted 6,651 people, 2,380 households, and 1,899 families in the township. The population density was 376.6 per square mile (145.4/km^{2}). There were 2,493 housing units at an average density of 141.1 per square mile (54.5/km^{2}). The racial makeup was 93.46% (6,216) White, 2.50% (166) Black or African American, 0.24% (16) Native American, 1.91% (127) Asian, 0.00% (0) Pacific Islander, 0.65% (43) from other races, and 1.25% (83) from two or more races. Hispanic or Latino of any race were 4.39% (292) of the population.

Of the 2,380 households, 35.0% had children under the age of 18; 69.0% were married couples living together; 7.6% had a female householder with no husband present and 20.2% were non-families. Of all households, 16.5% were made up of individuals and 7.1% had someone living alone who was 65 years of age or older. The average household size was 2.79 and the average family size was 3.14.

24.8% of the population were under the age of 18, 7.1% from 18 to 24, 22.5% from 25 to 44, 32.6% from 45 to 64, and 13.0% who were 65 years of age or older. The median age was 42.2 years. For every 100 females, the population had 94.4 males. For every 100 females ages 18 and older there were 93.2 males. The Census Bureau's 2006–2010 American Community Survey showed that (in 2010 inflation-adjusted dollars) median household income was $91,893 (with a margin of error of +/− $5,743) and the median family income was $99,332 (+/− $12,641). Males had a median income of $78,417 (+/− $14,664) versus $51,186 (+/− $17,904) for females. The per capita income for the borough was $39,873 (+/− $3,286). About 2.9% of families and 5.5% of the population were below the poverty line, including 6.8% of those under age 18 and 6.9% of those age 65 or over.

=== 2020 census ===
As of the 2000 United States census there were 6,248 people, 2,099 households, and 1,740 families residing in the township. The population density was 355.5 inhabitants per square mile (137.3/km^{2}). There were 2,174 housing units at an average density of 123.7 per square mile (47.8/km^{2}). The racial makeup of the township was 95.98% White, 1.71% African American, 0.06% Native American, 0.94% Asian, 0.50% from other races, and 0.80% from two or more races. Hispanic or Latino people of any race were 2.16% of the population.

There were 2,099 households, out of which 43.3% had children under the age of 18 living with them, 72.7% were married couples living together, 7.0% had a female householder with no husband present, and 17.1% were non-families. 14.1% of all households were made up of individuals, and 6.1% had someone living alone who was 65 years of age or older. The average household size was 2.95 and the average family size was 3.26.

In the township the population was spread out, with 30.0% under the age of 18, 5.7% from 18 to 24, 30.2% from 25 to 44, 24.4% from 45 to 64, and 9.7% who were 65 years of age or older. The median age was 38 years. For every 100 females, there were 95.6 males. For every 100 females age 18 and over, there were 93.6 males.

The median income for a household in the township was $77,458, and the median income for a family was $84,348. Males had a median income of $54,321 versus $35,056 for females. The per capita income for the township was $29,141. About 3.0% of families and 3.1% of the population were below the poverty line, including 3.2% of those under age 18 and 3.2% of those age 65 or over.

== Government ==
=== Local government ===
Washington Township is governed under the township form of New Jersey municipal government, one of 141 municipalities (of the 564) statewide that use this form, the second-most commonly used form of government in the state. The Township Committee is comprised of five members, who are elected directly by the voters at-large in partisan elections to serve three-year terms of office on a staggered basis, with either one or two seats coming up for election each year as part of the November general election in a three-year cycle. At an annual reorganization meeting, the Township Committee selects one of its members to serve as Mayor and another to serve as Deputy Mayor.

As of 2022, members of the Washington Township Committee are Mayor Robert J. Klingel (R, term on committee and as mayor ends December 31, 2022), Deputy mayor Mark Rossi (R, term on committee and as deputy mayor ends 2022), Ralph P. Fiore Jr. (R, 2024), Michael A. Kovacs (R, 2023) and George J. Willan (R, 2024).

In February 2016, the Township Committee unanimously selected George Willian from a list of three candidates nominated by the Republican municipal committee to fill the seat expiring in December 2018 that had been vacated by Nancy Andreson when she resigned for personal reasons shortly after taking office; Willan served on an interim basis until the November 2016 general election, when he was elected to serve the two years remaining on the term of office.

In December 2013, the Township Council chose Theresa Iacobucci from among three candidates offered by the Republican municipal committee to fill the vacant seat of John A. Horensky following his resignation. Iacobucci served on an interim basis until the November 2014 general election, when she was elected to serve the balance of the term through December 2015

=== Federal, state, and county representation ===
Washington Township is located in the 7th Congressional District and is part of New Jersey's 23rd state legislative district.

For the 119th United States Congress, New Jersey's 7th congressional district is represented by Thomas Kean Jr. (R, Westfield). New Jersey is represented in the United States Senate by Democrats Cory Booker (Newark, term ends 2027) and Andy Kim (Moorestown, term ends 2031).

For the 2026–2027 session, the 23rd legislative district of the New Jersey Legislature is represented in the State Senate by Doug Steinhardt (R, Lopatcong Township) and in the General Assembly by John DiMaio (R, Hackettstown) and Erik Peterson (R, Franklin Township).

Warren County is governed by a three-member Board of County Commissioners, who are chosen at-large on a staggered basis in partisan elections with one seat coming up for election each year as part of the November general election. At an annual reorganization meeting held in the beginning of January, the board selects one of its members to serve as Commissioner Director and other as Deputy Director. As of 2025, Warren County's Commissioners are:

Deputy Director Jason J. Sarnoski (R, Lopatcong Township; 2025), Lori Ciesla (R, Lopatcong Township; 2026), and Director James R. Kern III (R, Pohatcong Township; 2027).

Constitutional officers of Warren County are: Clerk Holly Mackey (R, Alpha; 2027), Sheriff James McDonald Sr. (R, Phillipsburg; 2025) and Surrogate Michael J. Doherty (R, Washington; 2025).

=== Politics ===
As of March 2011, there were a total of 3,790 registered voters in Washington, of which 736 (19.4% vs. 21.5% countywide) were registered as Democrats, 1,136 (30.0% vs. 35.3%) were registered as Republicans and 1,917 (50.6% vs. 43.1%) were registered as Unaffiliated. There was one voter registered to another party. Among the borough's 2010 Census population, 58.7% (vs. 62.3% in Warren County) were registered to vote, including 77.1% of those ages 18 and over (vs. 81.5% countywide).

United States presidential election results for Washington Township
Year	Republican		Democratic		Third party(ies)	
Year	No.	%	No.	%	No.	%
2024	2,640	61.88%	1,565	36.69%	61	1.43%
2020	2,462	60.23%	1,561	38.18%	65	1.59%
2016	2,182	64.92%	1,057	31.45%	122	3.63%
2012	2,001	63.12%	1,118	35.27%	51	1.61%
2008	2,127	61.16%	1,302	37.44%	49	1.41%
2004	1,690	64.88%	871	33.44%	44	1.69%

Gubernatorial election results for Washington Township
Year	Republican		Democratic		Third party(ies)	
Year	No.	%	No.	%	No.	%
2025	1,954	59.56%	1,307	39.84%	20	0.61%
2021	1,766	68.61%	777	30.19%	31	1.20%
2017	1,372	67.06%	605	29.57%	69	3.37%
2013	1,432	76.17%	398	21.17%	50	2.66%
2009	960	58.86%	482	29.55%	189	11.59%
2005	1,440	65.34%	641	29.08%	123	5.58%

In the 2013 gubernatorial election, Republican Chris Christie received 76.2% of the vote (1,432 cast), ahead of Democrat Barbara Buono with 21.2% (398 votes), and other candidates with 2.7% (50 votes), among the 1,924 ballots cast by the township's 4,652 registered voters (44 ballots were spoiled), for a turnout of 41.4%. In the 2009 gubernatorial election, Republican Chris Christie received 960 votes here (57.6% vs. 61.3% countywide), ahead of Democrat Jon Corzine with 482 votes (28.9% vs. 25.7%), Independent Chris Daggett with 167 votes (10.0% vs. 9.8%) and other candidates with 22 votes (1.3% vs. 1.5%), among the 1,666 ballots cast by the borough's 3,646 registered voters, yielding a 45.7% turnout (vs. 49.6% in the county).

United States Senate election results for Washington Township1
Year	Republican		Democratic		Third party(ies)	
Year	No.	%	No.	%	No.	%
2024	2,528	61.28%	1,496	36.27%	101	2.45%
2018	1,786	64.43%	878	31.67%	108	3.90%
2012	1,931	63.71%	1,047	34.54%	53	1.75%
2006	1,074	62.15%	558	32.29%	96	5.56%

United States Senate election results for Washington Township2
Year	Republican		Democratic		Third party(ies)	
Year	No.	%	No.	%	No.	%
2020	2,415	60.31%	1,484	37.06%	105	2.62%
2014	1,031	65.54%	488	31.02%	54	3.43%
2013	856	69.54%	358	29.08%	17	1.38%
2008	2,113	64.26%	1,086	33.03%	89	2.71%

== Education ==
Students in pre-kindergarten through sixth grade attend public school in the Washington Township School District. As of the 2023–24 school year, the district, comprised of two schools, had an enrollment of 407 students and 41.5 classroom teachers (on an FTE basis), for a student–teacher ratio of 9.8:1. Schools in the district (with 2023–24 enrollment data from the National Center for Education Statistics) are Port Colden School with 158 students in grades 1–3 and Brass Castle School with 247 students in pre-kindergarten, kindergarten and grades 4–6.

Public school students in seventh through twelfth grades attend the schools of the Warren Hills Regional School District, which also serves students from the municipalities of Franklin Township, Mansfield Township and Washington Borough, along with those from Oxford Township who attend for grades 9–12 only. Schools in the district (with 2023–24 enrollment data from the National Center for Education Statistics) are Warren Hills Regional Middle School located in Washington Borough with 480 students in grades 7–8 and Warren Hills Regional High School located in Washington Township with 1,066 students in grades 9–12. Seats on the high school district's nine-member board of education are allocated to the constituent municipalities based on population, with three seats allocated to Washington Township.

Students from the township and from all of Warren County are eligible to attend Ridge and Valley Charter School in Frelinghuysen Township (for grades K–8) or Warren County Technical School in Washington borough (for 9–12), with special education services provided by local districts supplemented throughout the county by the Warren County Special Services School District in Oxford Township (for PreK–12).

== Transportation ==
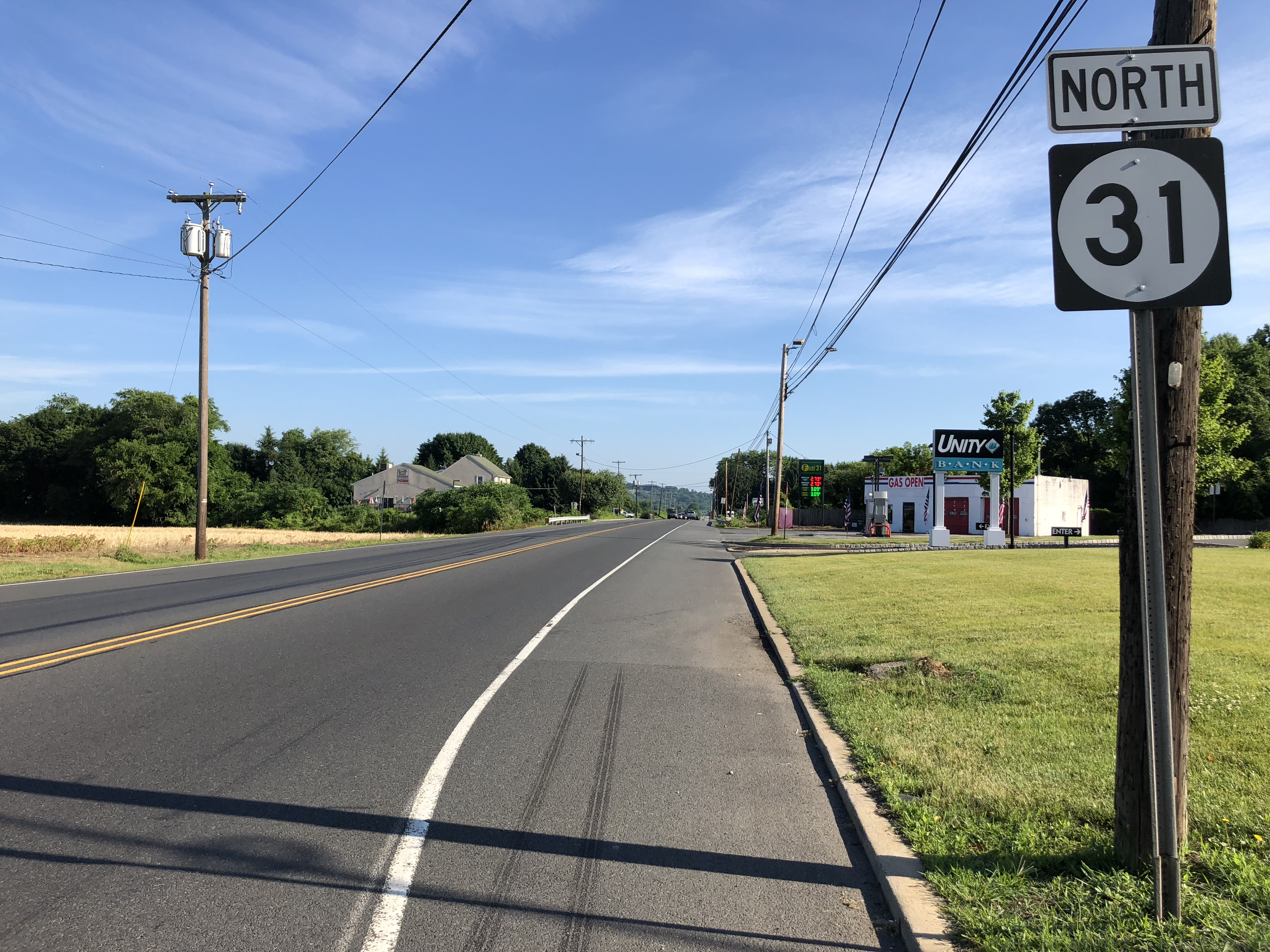
Route 31 northbound in Washington Township

As of May 2010, the township had a total of 65.77 miles (105.85 km) of roadways, of which 35.61 miles (57.31 km) were maintained by the municipality, 22.92 miles (36.89 km) by Warren County and 7.24 miles (11.65 km) by the New Jersey Department of Transportation.

Public transportation is available along Route 31 and Route 57, which are the main highways serving the township. The Route 57 shuttle runs between Washington and Philipsburg Monday-Saturday, and between Washington and Hackettstown Monday-Friday. The Route 31 shuttle operates between the Clinton Park & Ride on the southern end and Oxford Township on the northern end Monday-Friday.

== Notable people ==
People who were born in, residents of, or otherwise closely associated with Washington Township include:

- Michael J. Doherty (born 1963), Surrogate of Warren County, New Jersey who served in the New Jersey Senate from 2009 to 2022
- Jared Isaacman (born 1983), businessman, Commercial astronaut, and 15th Administrator of NASA.
- Jean Shepherd (1921–1999), radio personality, humorist, narrator of the popular holiday film A Christmas Story
- Mark Thomson (1739 –1803), United States representative from New Jersey, who served from 1795 to 1799
- Sung J. Woo (born 1971), Korean American writer who wrote the novel Everything Asian

== Wineries ==
- Vacchiano Farm

== Surrounding communities ==
Also, the township completely surrounds the borough of Washington.
