= Port Murray, New Jersey =

Census-designated place in Warren County, New Jersey, United States

- Census-designated place
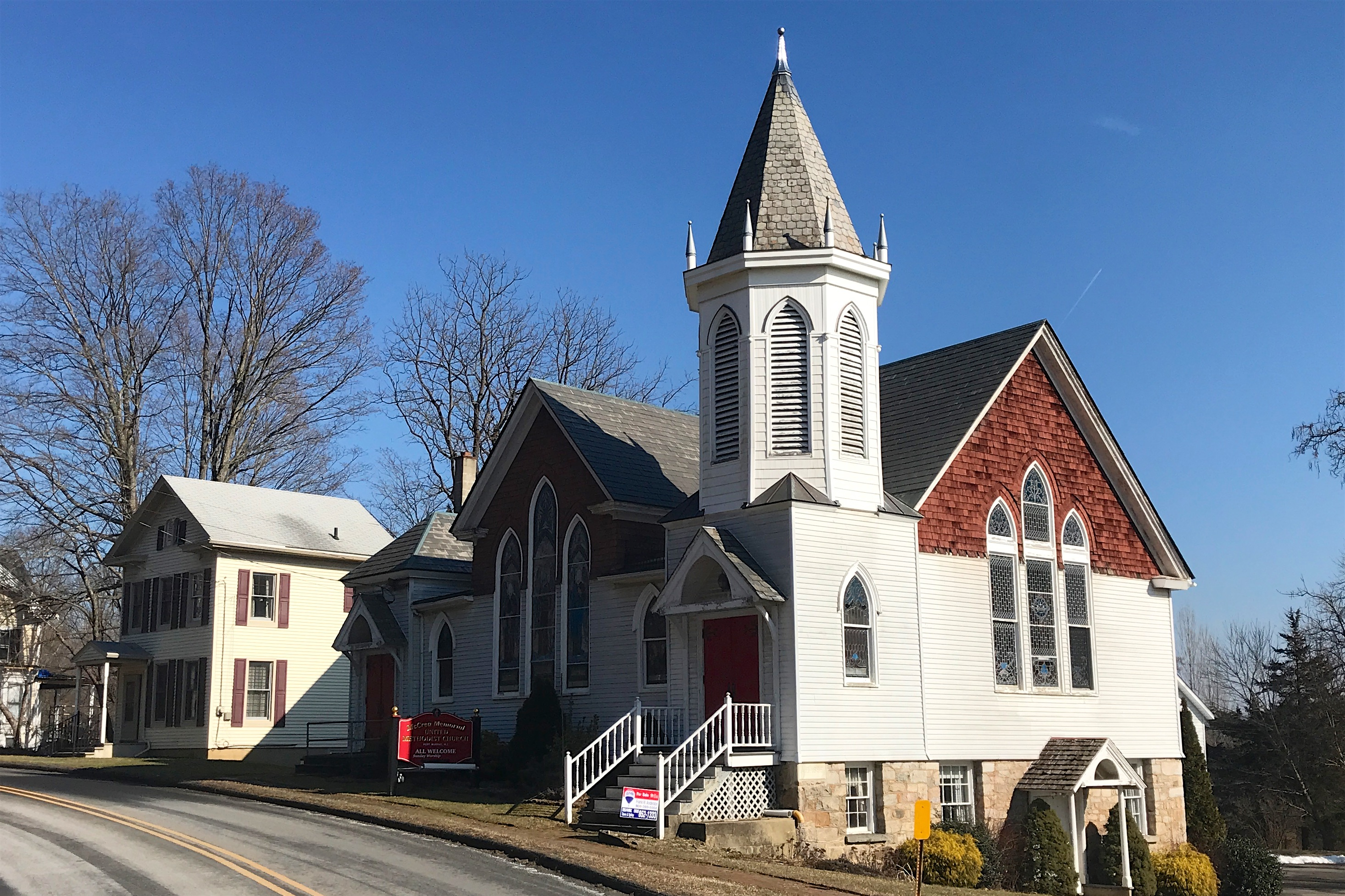
- Historic buildings on Main Street

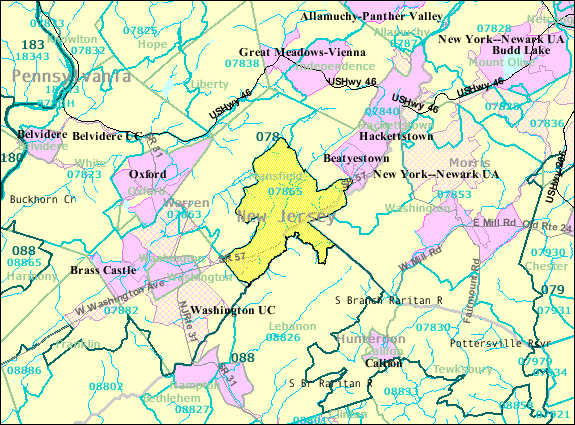
- United States Census Bureau map of ZCTA 07865 Port Murray, New Jersey

- Location in Warren County Location in New Jersey Location in the United States
- Coordinates: 40.793505°N 74.913547°W
- Country: United States
- State: New Jersey
- County: Warren
- Township: Mansfield
- Named after: James Boyles Murray

Area
  - Total: 0.99 sq mi (2.56 km^{2})
  - Land: 0.99 sq mi (2.56 km^{2})
  - Water: 0 sq mi (0.00 km^{2}) 0.57%
- Elevation: 633 ft (193 m)

Population (2020)
  - Total: 227
  - Density: 229.6/sq mi (88.65/km^{2})
- Time zone: UTC−05:00 (Eastern (EST))
  - Summer (DST): UTC−04:00 (EDT)
- ZIP Code: 07865
- Area code: 908
- FIPS code: 34-60450
- GNIS feature ID: 02584020

Port Murray is an unincorporated community and census-designated place (CDP) located within Mansfield Township in Warren County, in the U.S. state of New Jersey, that was created as part of the 2010 United States census. As of the 2020 census, Port Murray had a population of 227.

The community was long known by this name for its location on the Morris Canal and after Colonel James Boyles Murray, the third president of the Morris Canal and Banking Company.

The area is served as United States Postal Service ZIP Code 07865.

== Geography ==
According to the United States Census Bureau, the CDP had a total area of 0.168 square miles (0.435 km^{2}), including 0.167 square miles (0.433 km^{2}) of land and 0.001 square miles (0.002 km^{2}) of water (0.57%).

== Demographics ==
Historical population
Census	Pop.	Note	%±
2010	129		—
2020	227		76.0%
U.S. Decennial Census; 2010 2020

Port Murray first appeared as a census designated place in the 2010 U.S. census.

=== 2020 census ===
Port Murray CDP, New Jersey – Racial and ethnic composition Note: the US Census treats Hispanic/Latino as an ethnic category. This table excludes Latinos from the racial categories and assigns them to a separate category. Hispanics/Latinos may be of any race.
Race / Ethnicity (NH = Non-Hispanic)	Pop 2010	Pop 2020	% 2010	% 2020
White alone (NH)	124	196	96.12%	86.34%
Black or African American alone (NH)	2	1	1.55%	0.44%
Native American or Alaska Native alone (NH)	0	0	0.00%	0.00%
Asian alone (NH)	0	10	0.00%	4.41%
Native Hawaiian or Pacific Islander alone (NH)	0	0	0.00%	0.00%
Other race alone (NH)	0	2	0.00%	0.88%
Mixed race or Multiracial (NH)	1	9	0.78%	3.96%
Hispanic or Latino (any race)	2	9	1.55%	3.96%
Total	129	227	100.00%	100.00%

=== 2010 census ===
The 2010 United States census counted 129 people, 57 households, and 39 families in the CDP. The population density was 772.2 per square mile (298.1/km^{2}). There were 63 housing units at an average density of 377.1 per square mile (145.6/km^{2}). The racial makeup was 97.67% (126) White, 1.55% (2) Black or African American, 0.00% (0) Native American, 0.00% (0) Asian, 0.00% (0) Pacific Islander, 0.00% (0) from other races, and 0.78% (1) from two or more races. Hispanic or Latino of any race were 1.55% (2) of the population.

Of the 57 households, 21.1% had children under the age of 18; 56.1% were married couples living together; 5.3% had a female householder with no husband present and 31.6% were non-families. Of all households, 22.8% were made up of individuals and 5.3% had someone living alone who was 65 years of age or older. The average household size was 2.26 and the average family size was 2.64.

14.7% of the population were under the age of 18, 7.0% from 18 to 24, 23.3% from 25 to 44, 35.7% from 45 to 64, and 19.4% who were 65 years of age or older. The median age was 48.1 years. For every 100 females, the population had 126.3 males. For every 100 females ages 18 and older there were 120.0 males.

=== 2000 census ===
As of the 2000 United States census, the population for ZIP Code Tabulation Area 07865 was 2,010.

== Transportation ==
Port Murray had a station on the Morris and Essex Railroad, located 67 miles (108 km) west of New York City.

== Historic district ==
The Port Murray Historic District was added to the National Register of Historic Places on June 7, 1996.

== Notable people ==
People who were born in, residents of, or otherwise closely associated with Port Murray include:

- John Eugene Kunzler (1923– 2006), scientist and physicist who conducted pioneering research into the field of superconducting magnets.

== Gallery ==
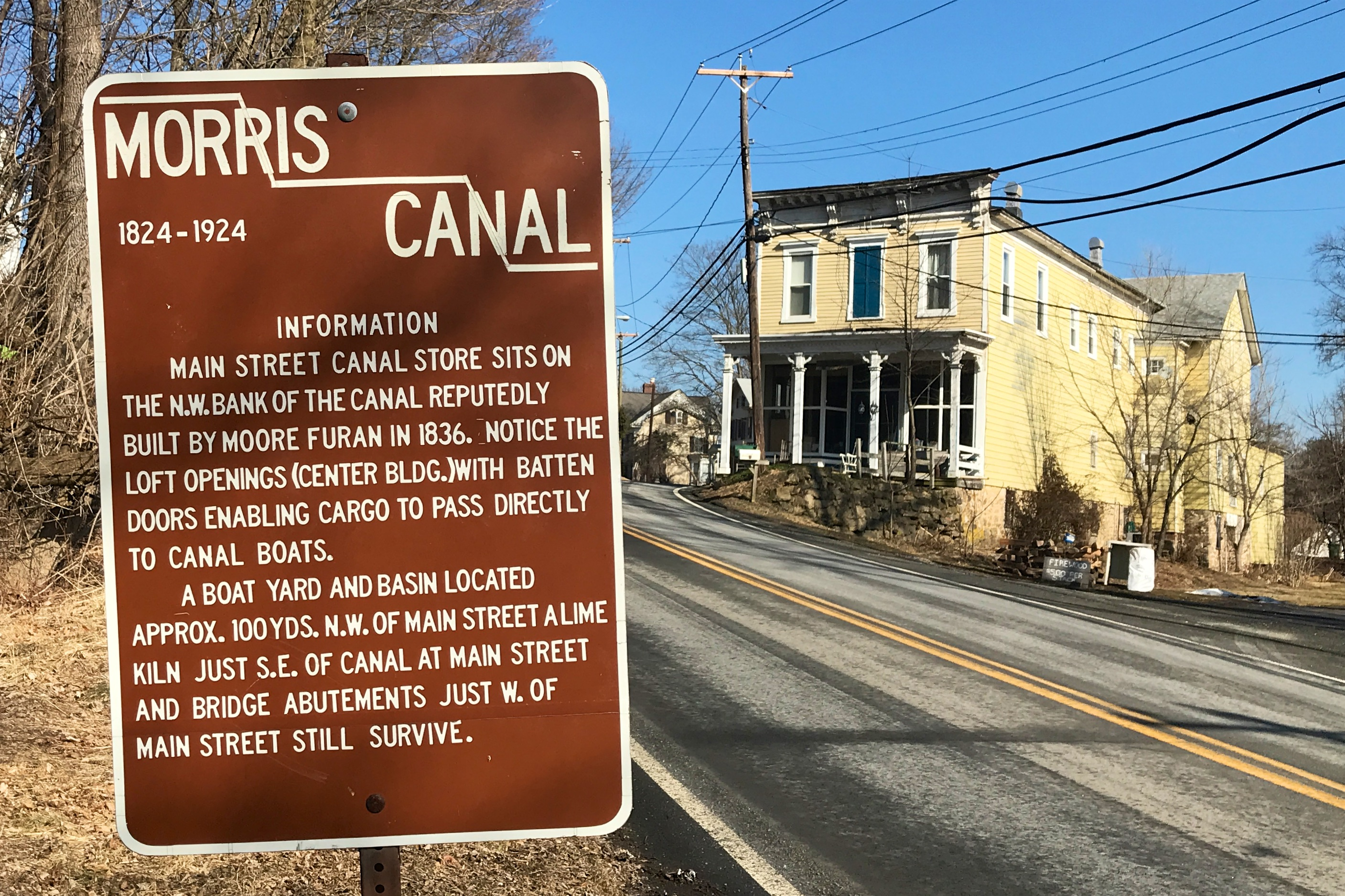
Canal Store on the Morris Canal

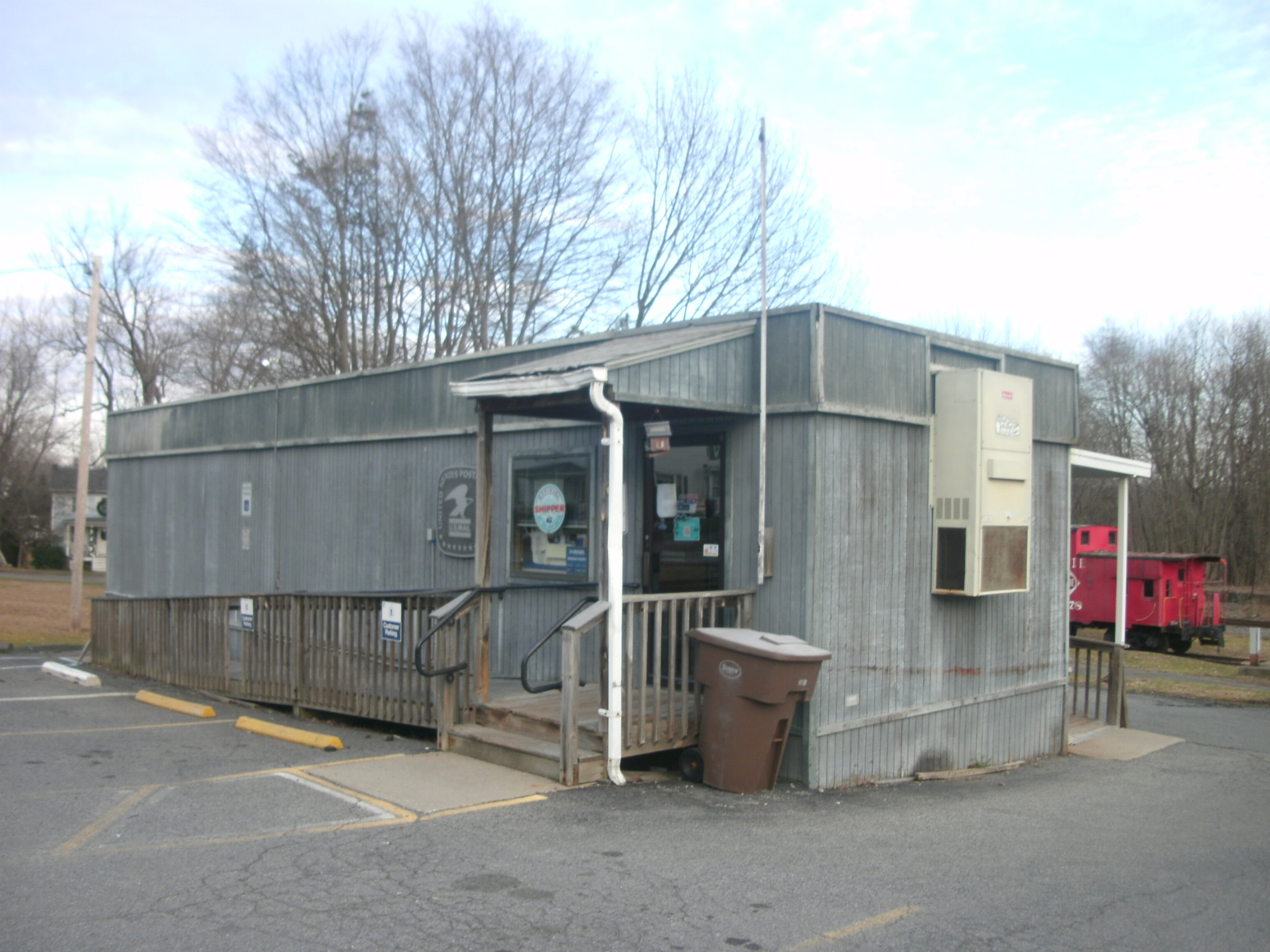
Post office consisting of a one-story trailer

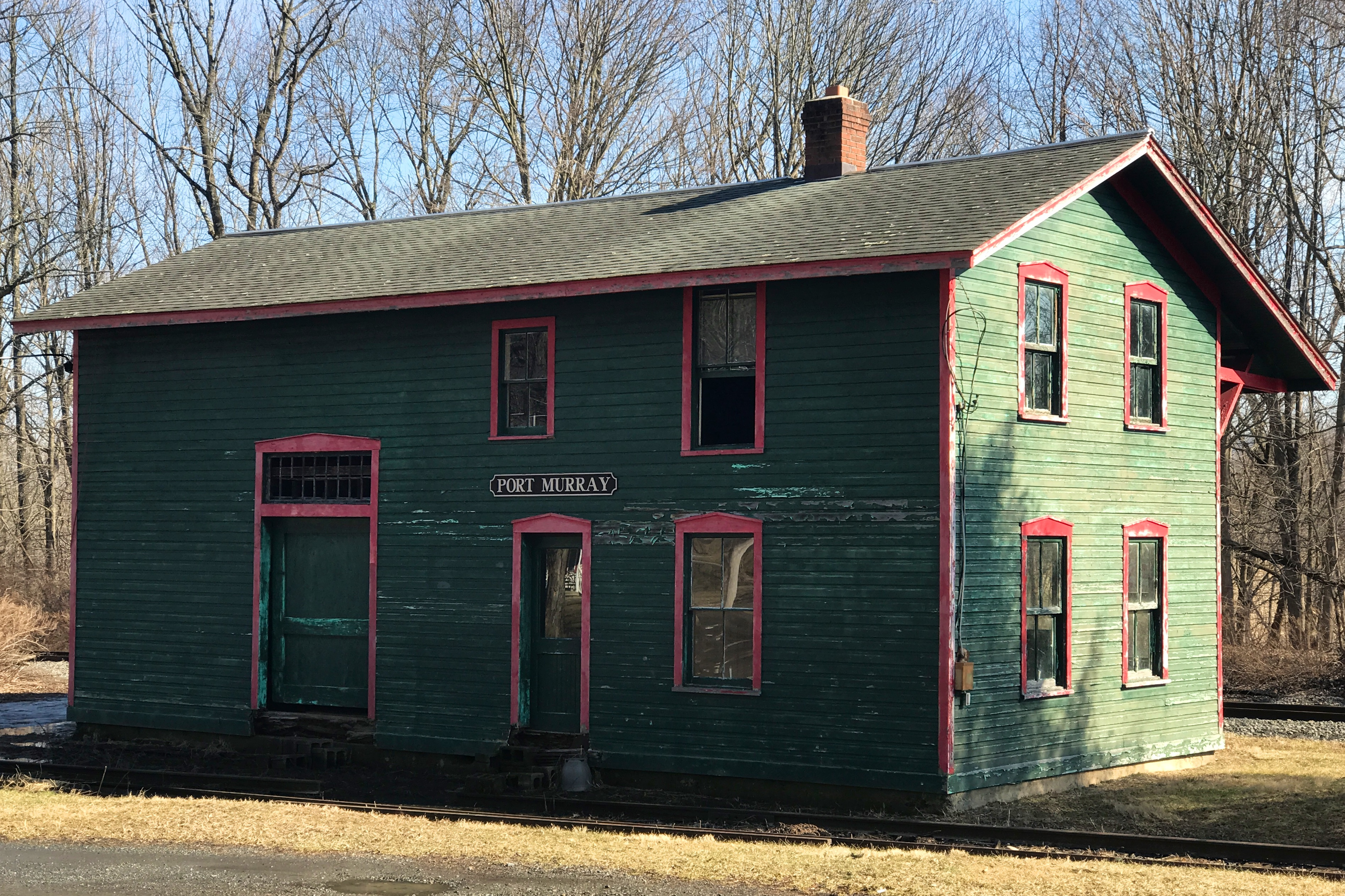
Former station on the Morris and Essex Railroad

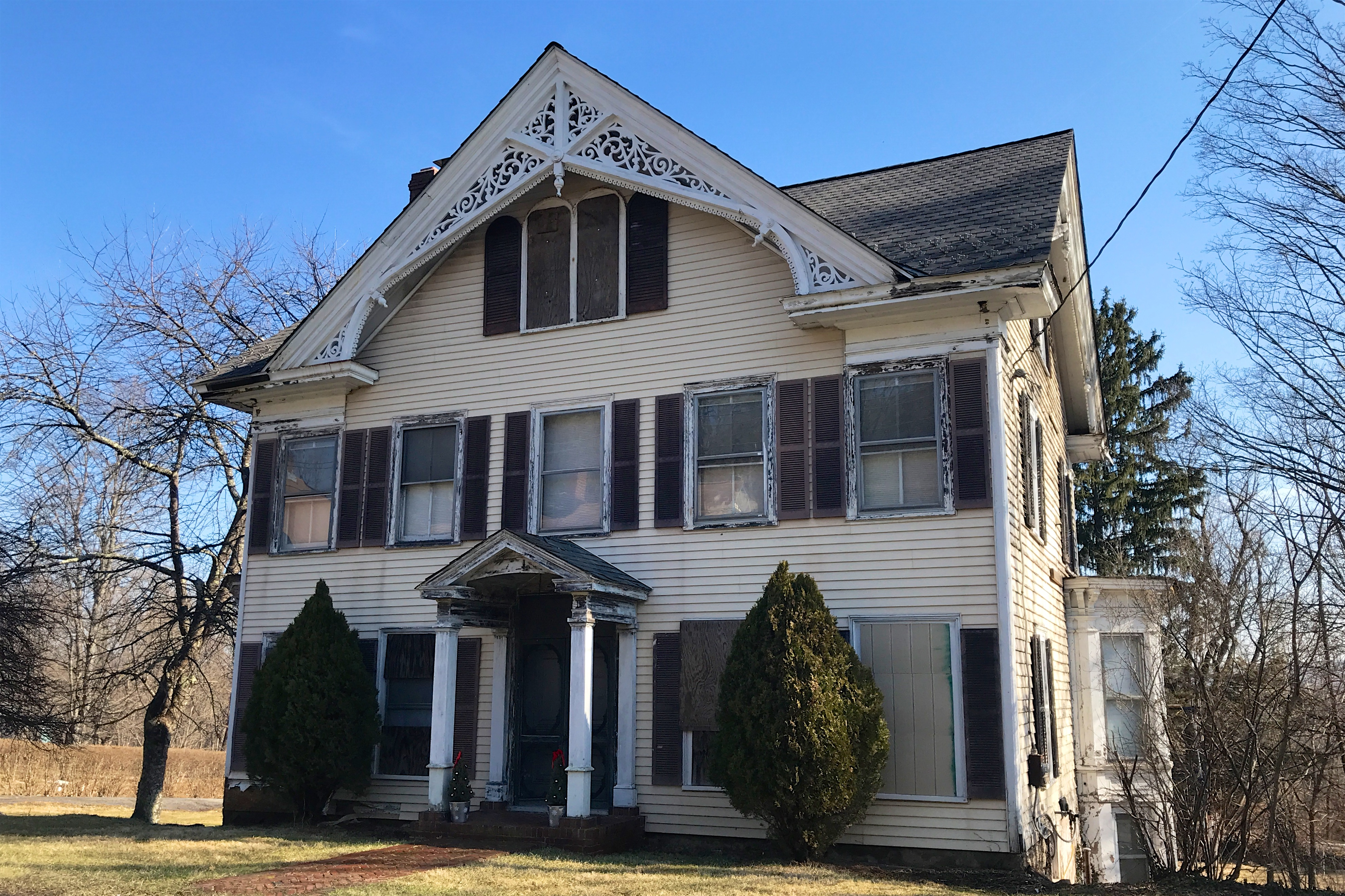
Port Murray Historic District
Carpenter Gothic architecture
