= Port Colden Historic District =

Historic district in New Jersey, United States

- U.S. National Register of Historic Places
- U.S. Historic district
- New Jersey Register of Historic Places
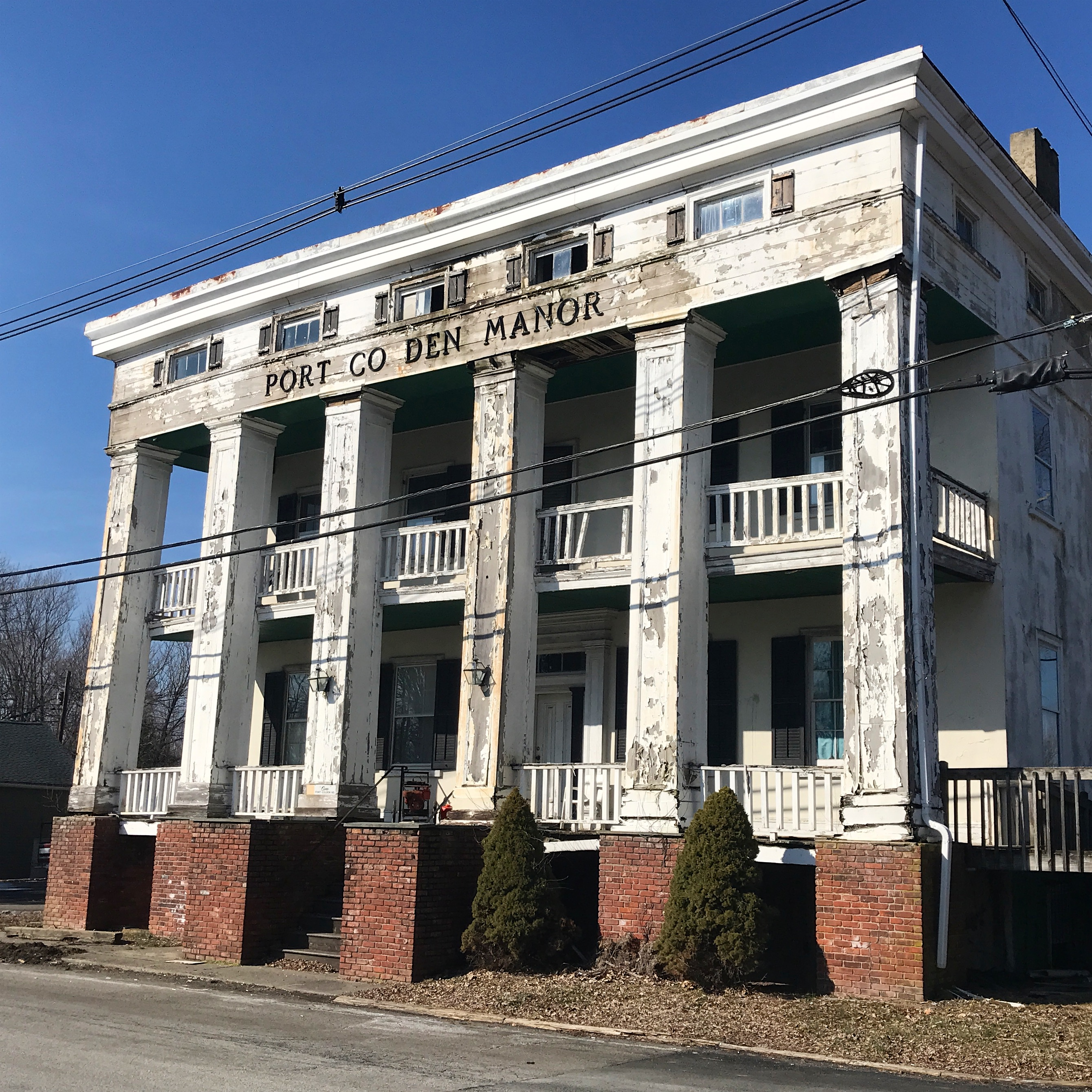
- Port Colden Manor, built 1835

- Location within Warren County, New Jersey Location within New Jersey Location within the United States
- Location: Roughly along Port Colden Road, Lock Street, NJ 57, and Morris Canal Terrace; Port Colden, New Jersey
- Coordinates: 40°45′55″N 74°57′19″W
- Area: 91 acres (37 ha)
- Built: 1835
- Architect: A.H. Price
- Architectural style: Greek Revival, Gothic Revival
- NRHP reference No.: 98001639
- NJRHP No.: 107

Significant dates
- Added to NRHP: January 21, 1999
- Designated NJRHP: November 23, 1998

The Port Colden Historic District is a 91-acre (37 ha) historic district in the Port Colden section of Washington Township in Warren County, New Jersey, United States. It was an important transportation location, being on the Morris Canal. The district was added to the National Register of Historic Places on January 21, 1999 for its significance in transportation, development pattern, commerce, education, and architecture from 1824 to 1924. It includes 59 contributing buildings, 3 contributing sites, and 3 contributing objects.

== History and description ==
The community grew after the Morris Canal opened in 1831. It had a boat basin, Lock 6 West, and Inclined Plane 6 West, one of three double-track inclined planes on the canal. The three-story brick Port Colden Manor was built in 1835 and features Greek Revival architecture as seen in the full-height portico with six massive square pillars. The Port Colden United Methodist Church, designed by architect A.H. Price with Carpenter Gothic architecture and Stick style, was built around 1892–1893. The former Port Colden Schoolhouse was built in 1869 and features Italianate and Gothic Revival styles.

== Gallery ==
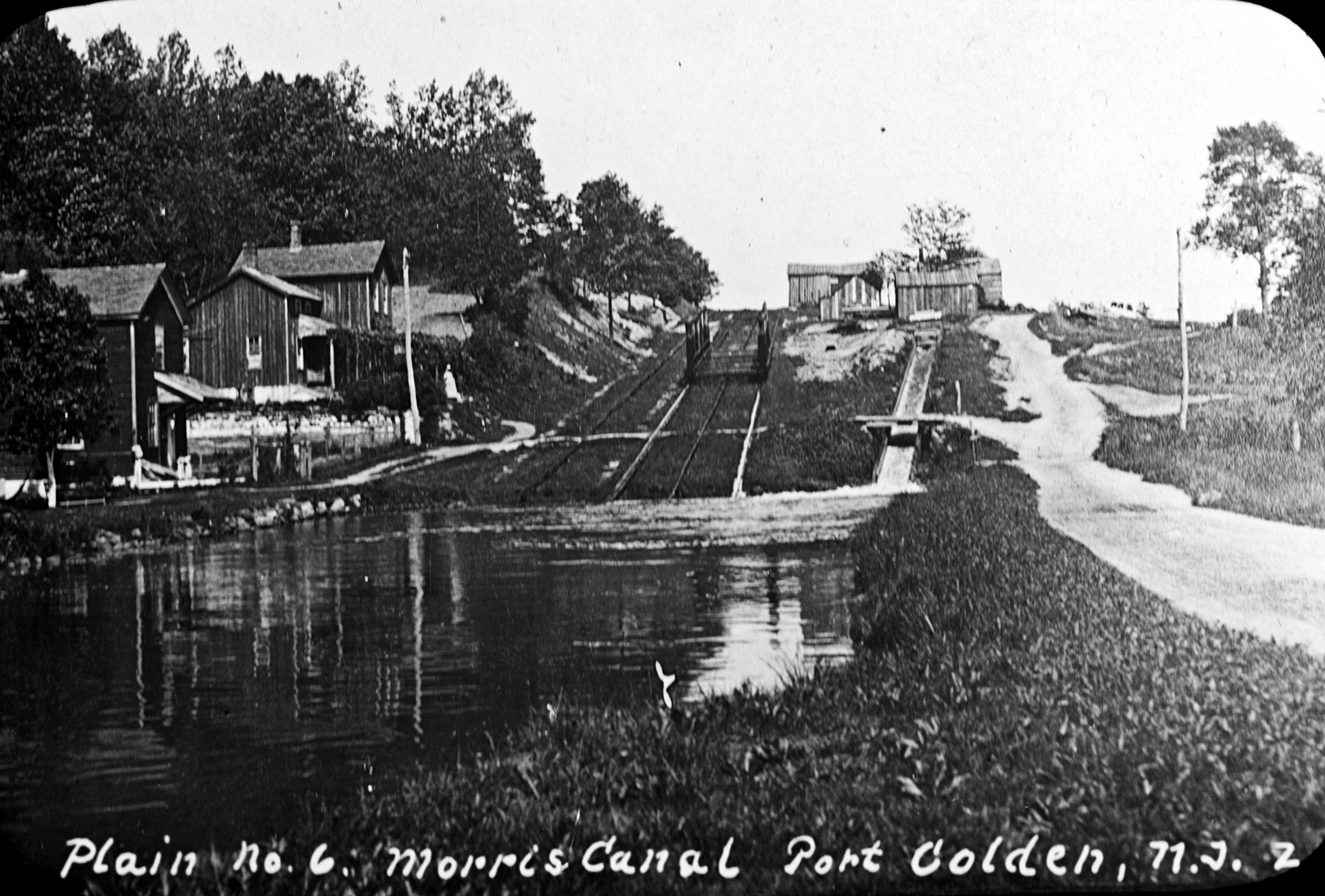
Morris Canal, Inclined Plane 6 West

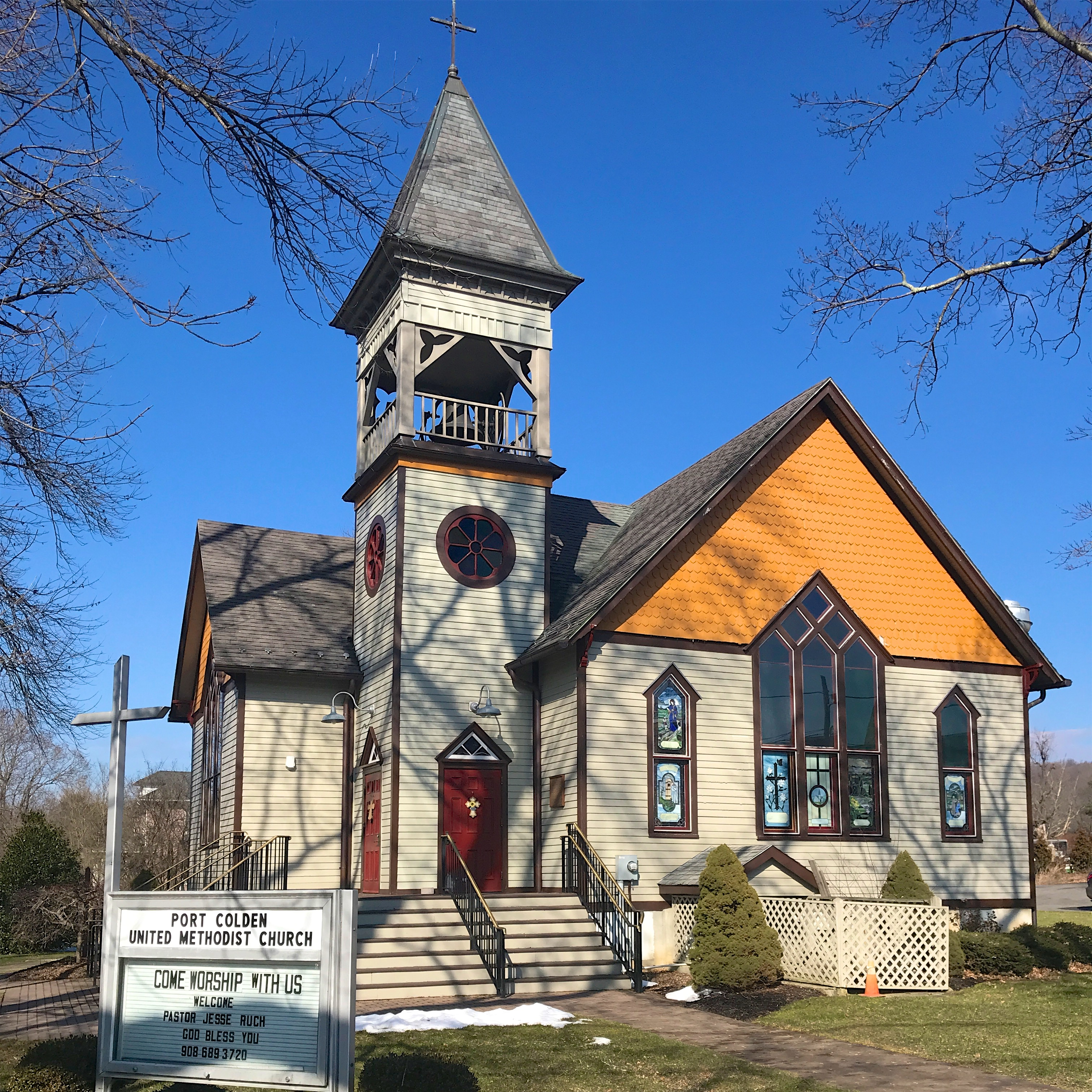
Port Colden United Methodist Church

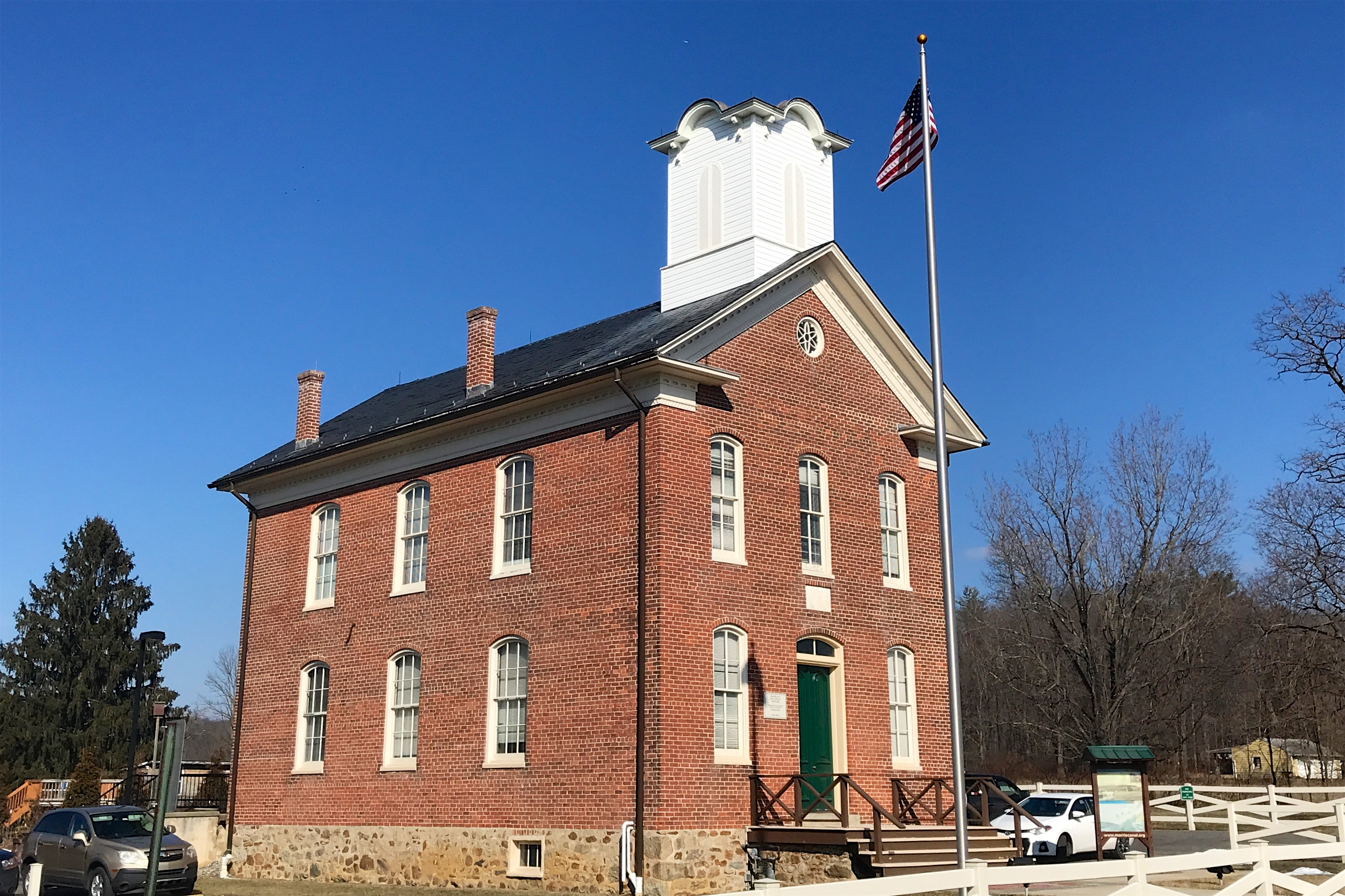
Former Port Colden Schoolhouse

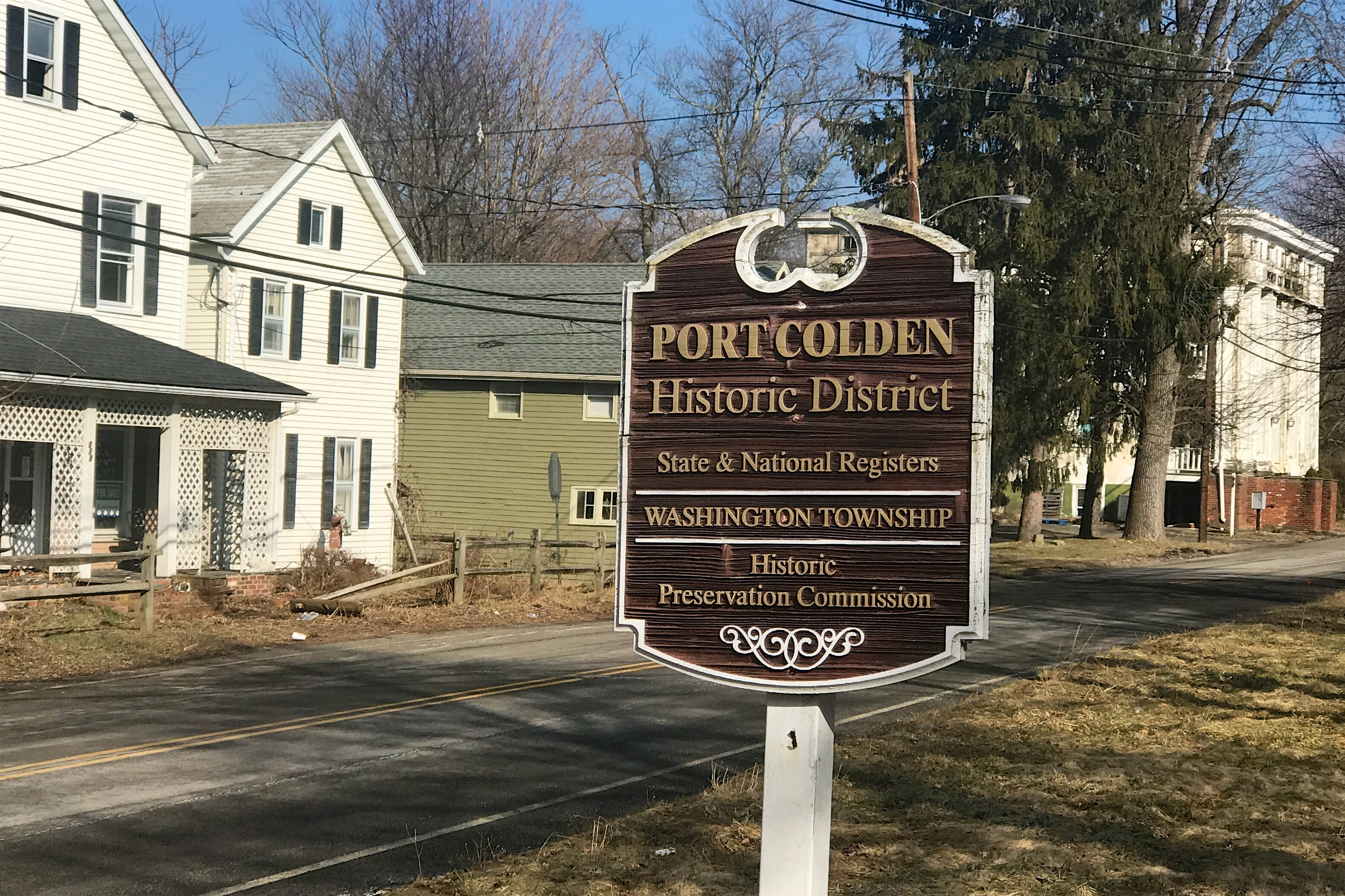
View of contributing properties at the intersection of Lock Street and Port Colden Road

== See also ==
- National Register of Historic Places listings in Warren County, New Jersey
- Port Murray Historic District
