= Port Murray Historic District =

Historic district in New Jersey, United States

- U.S. National Register of Historic Places
- U.S. Historic district
- New Jersey Register of Historic Places
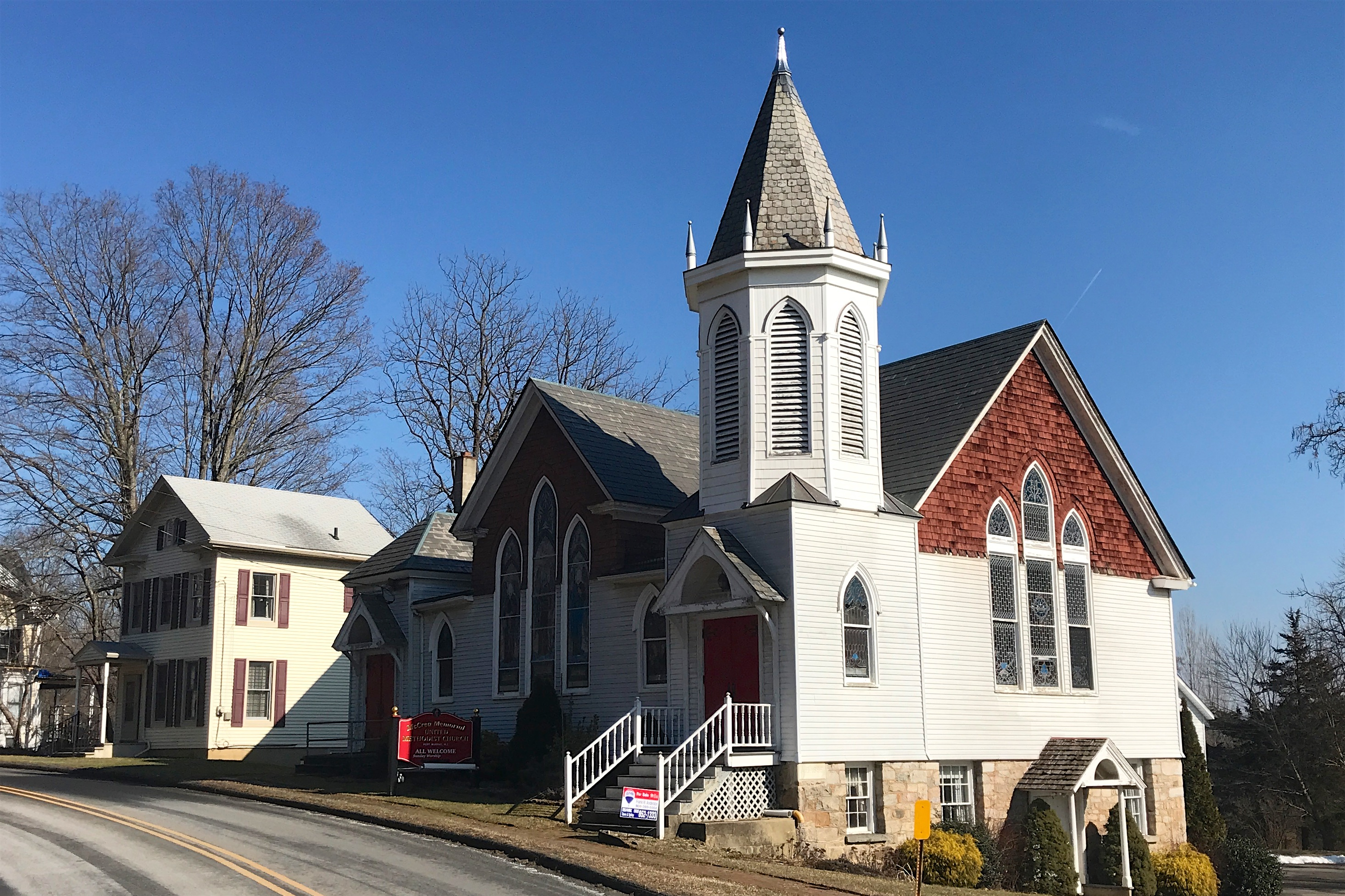
- McCrea Memorial Methodist Church on Main Street

- Location within Warren County, New Jersey Location within New Jersey Location within the United States
- Location: Roughly, Port Murray Road from Cherry Tree Bend Road to Hoffman Road; Port Murray, New Jersey
- Coordinates: 40°47′31″N 74°54′51″W
- Area: 88 acres (36 ha)
- Built: 1828
- Architectural style: Italianate, Second Empire, Carpenter Gothic
- NRHP reference No.: 96000658
- NJRHP No.: 3499

Significant dates
- Added to NRHP: June 7, 1996
- Designated NJRHP: April 26, 1996

The Port Murray Historic District is a 88-acre (36 ha) historic district in the Port Murray section of Mansfield Township in Warren County, New Jersey, United States. It was an important transportation location, being on the Morris Canal and the Morris and Essex Railroad. The district was added to the National Register of Historic Places on June 7, 1996 for its significance in community development, architecture, and transportation from 1828 to 1915. It includes 82 contributing buildings, 7 contributing sites, and 12 contributing structures.

== History and description ==
The community grew after the completion of the Morris Canal in 1831. It had a boat basin and was located near Inclined Plane 5 West. The canal store was built in 1836. The Morris and Essex Railroad was constructed in 1850. The train station was built around 1909–1914 and handled both passenger and freight trains. The McCrea Memorial Methodist Church was built in 1895 and features Shingle style architecture. The Italianate house built by Samuel McCrea around 1860–1873 became the Methodist Church Parsonage in 1898. The former Mansfield Baptist Church was built in 1842, with the belfry added in 1894.

== Gallery ==
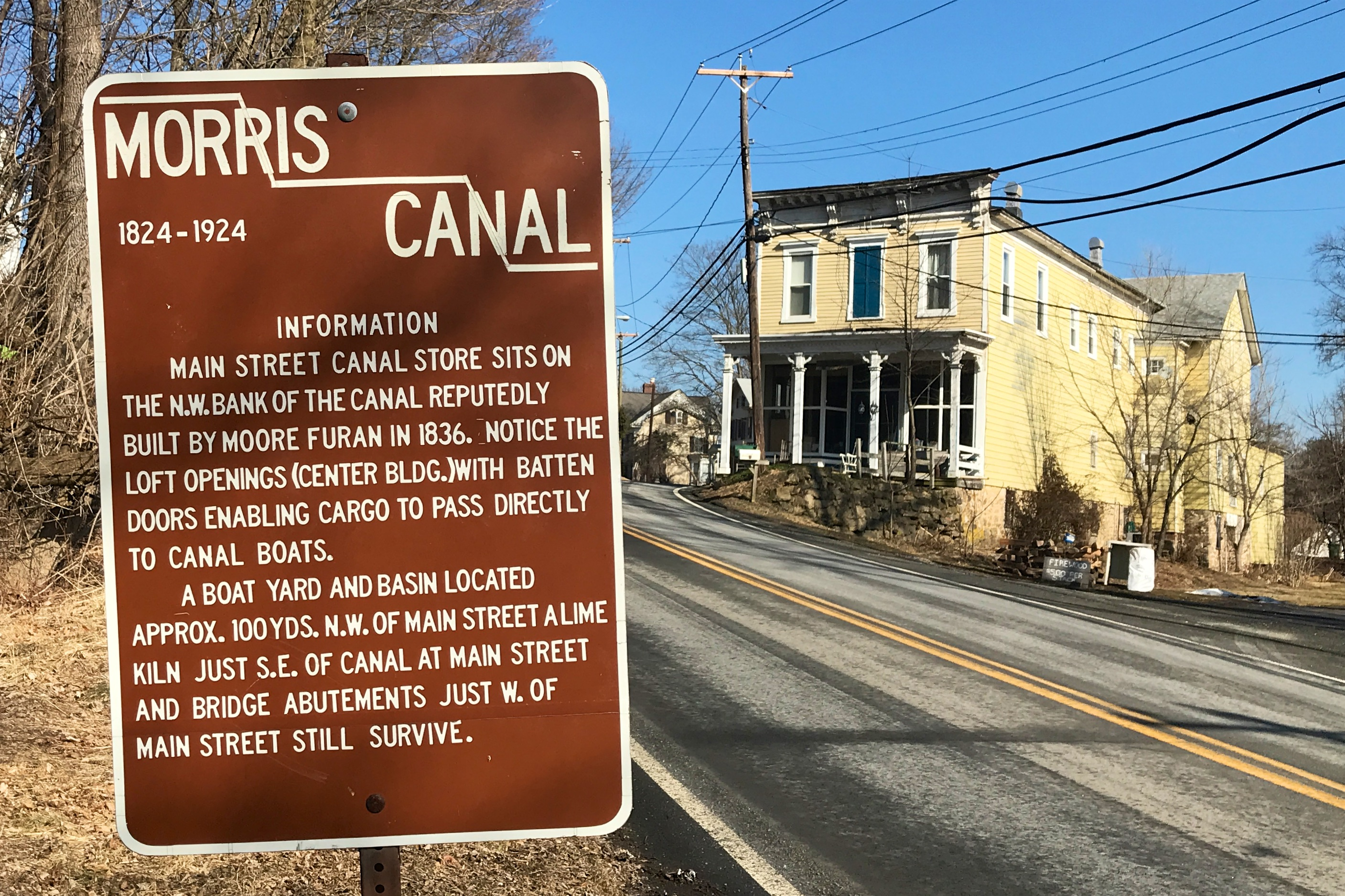
Canal Store on the Morris Canal

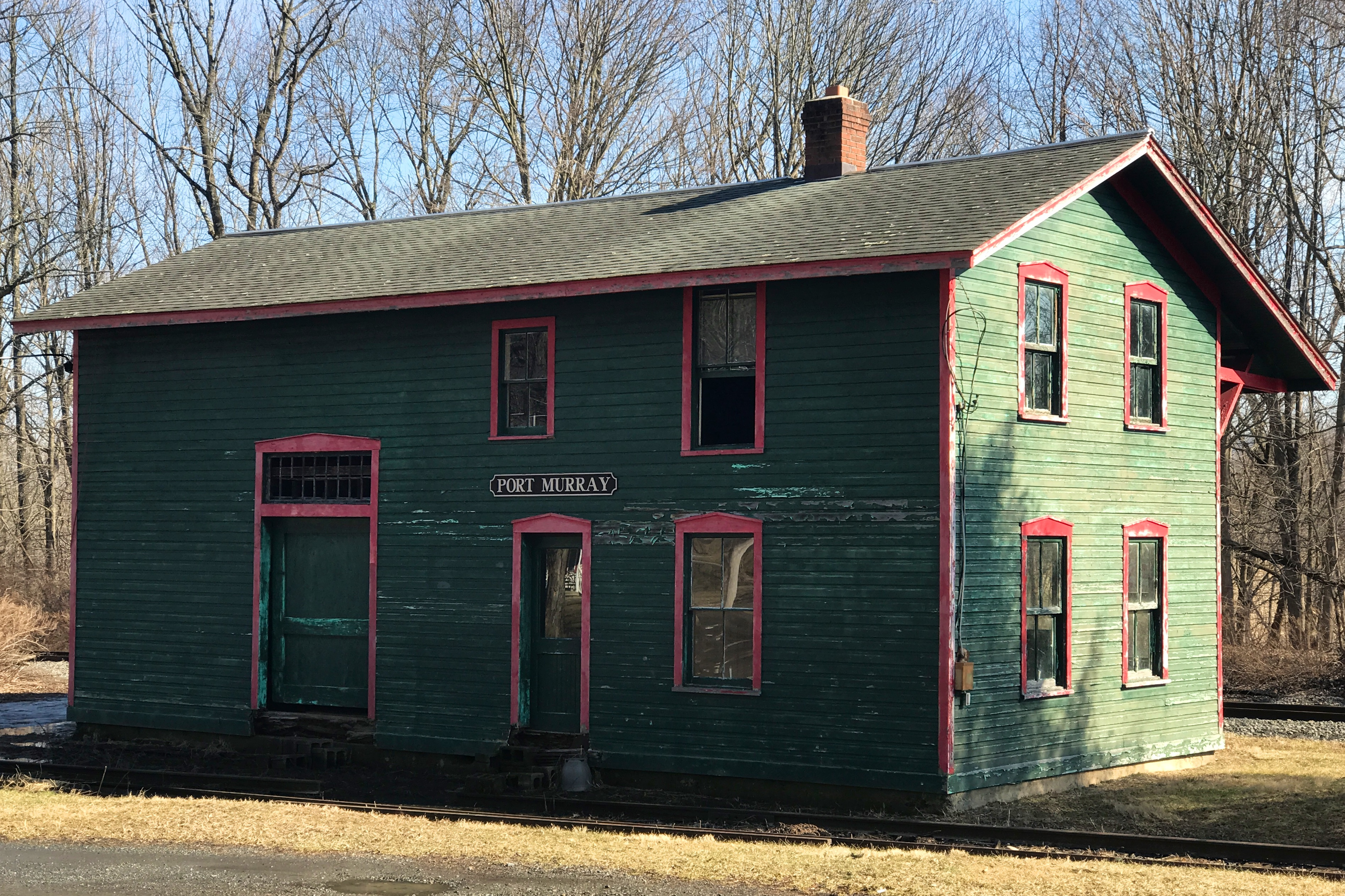
Former train station on the Morris and Essex Railroad

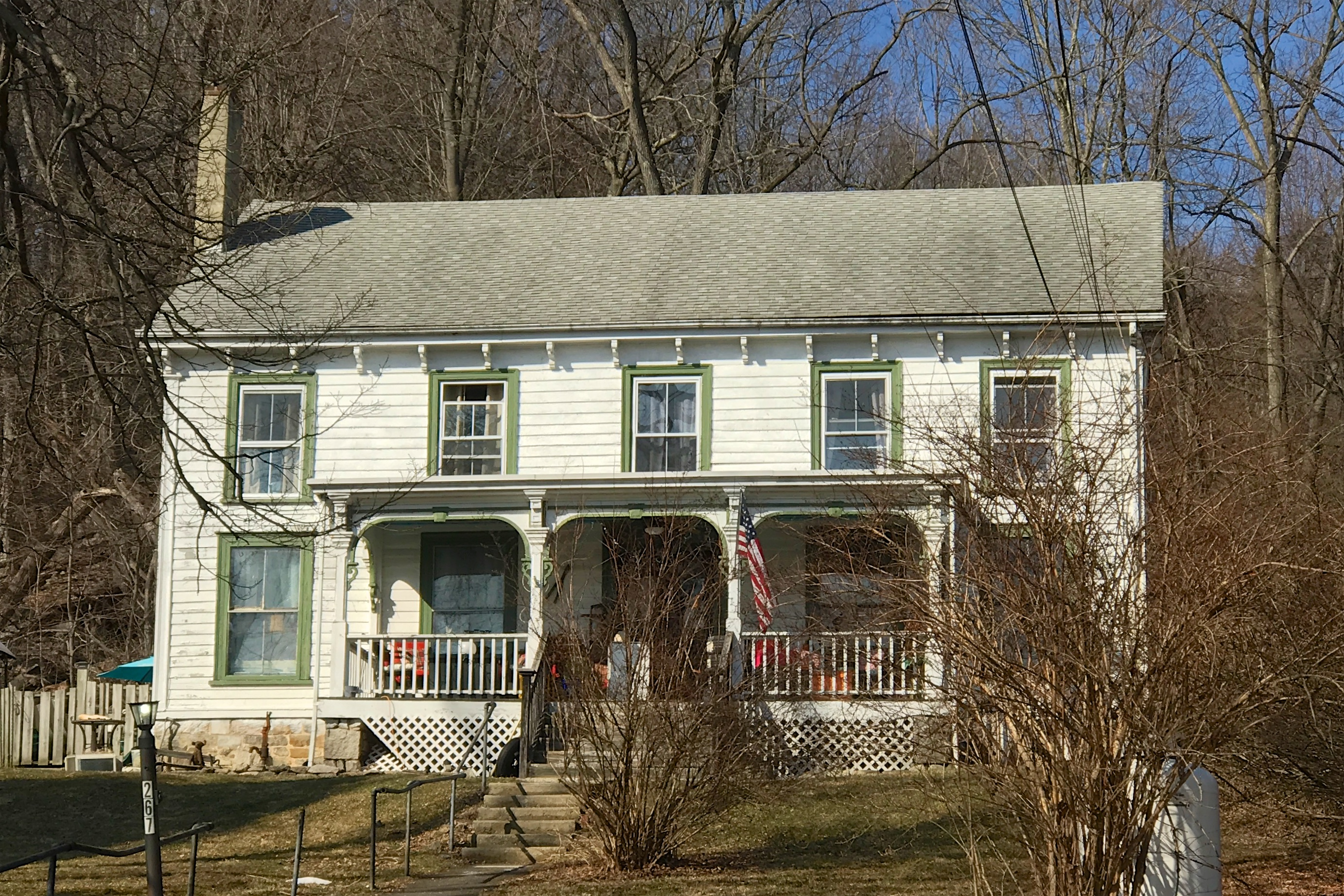
Built by Samuel McCrea, used as Methodist Church Parsonage

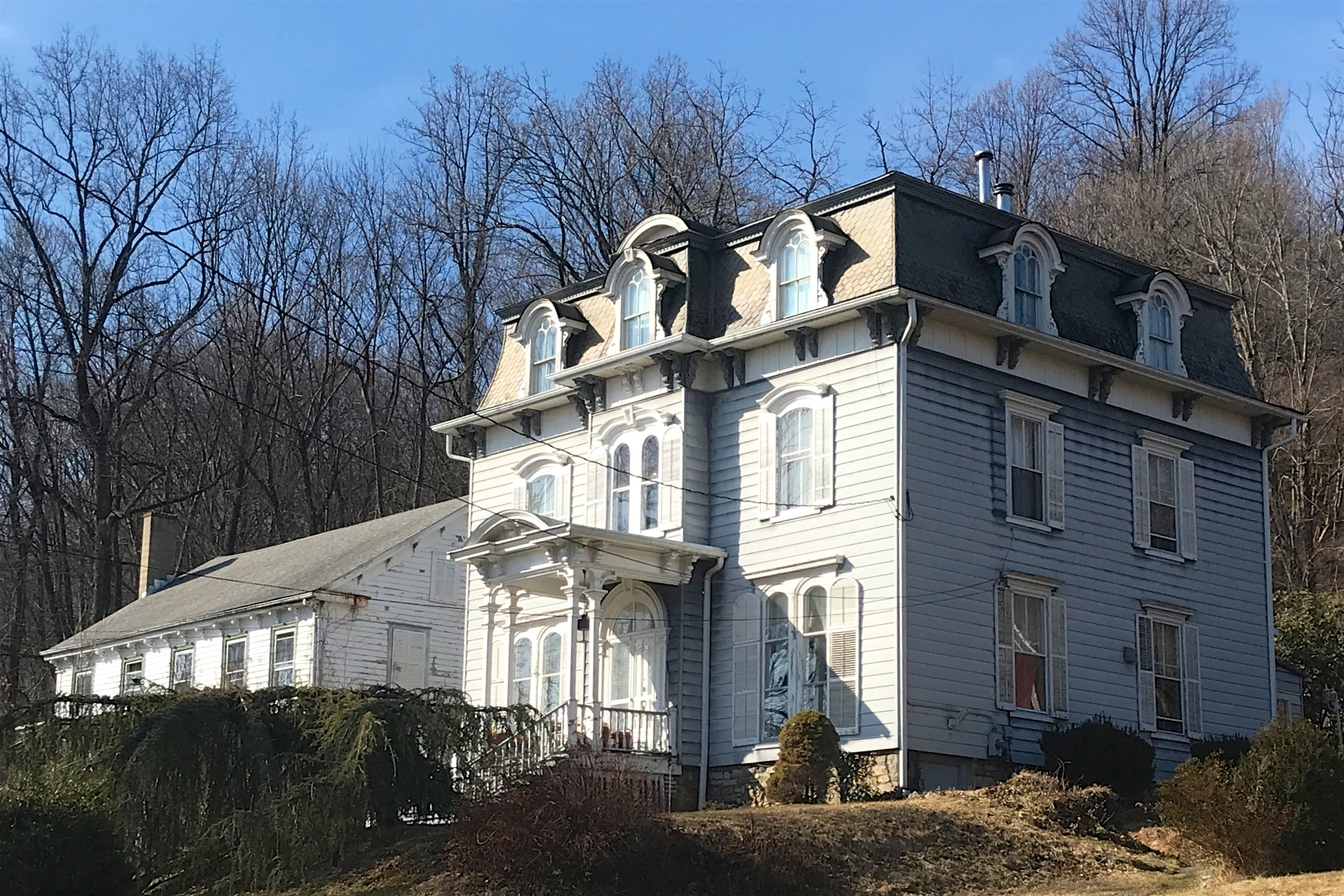
Franco-Italianate Second Empire style house

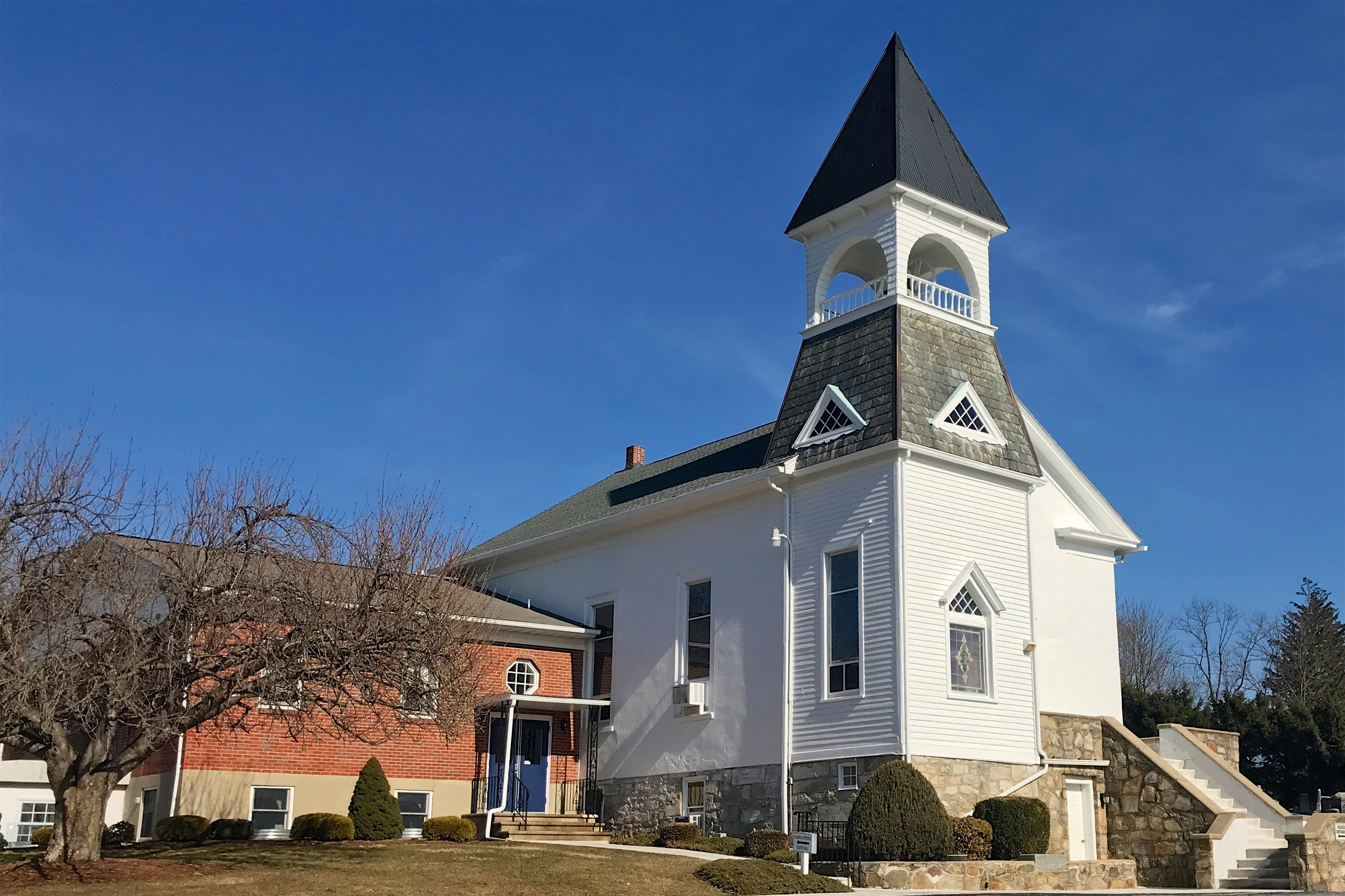
Former Mansfield Baptist Church, currently the Abundant Life Community Church

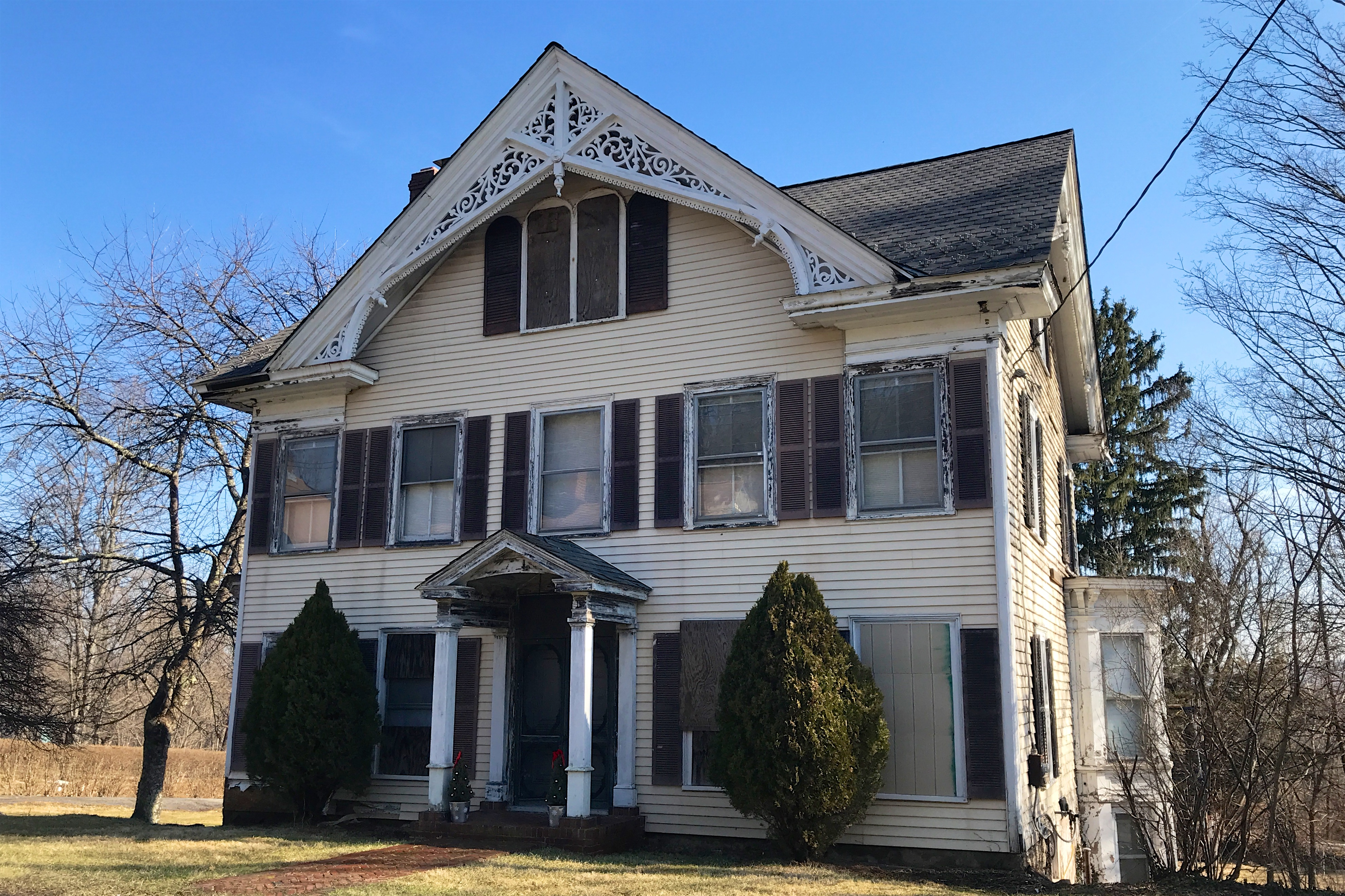
Carpenter Gothic style house

== See also ==
- National Register of Historic Places listings in Warren County, New Jersey
- List of bridges on the National Register of Historic Places in New Jersey
- Port Colden Historic District
