= Imlaydale Historic District =

Historic district in New Jersey, United States

- U.S. National Register of Historic Places
- U.S. Historic district
- New Jersey Register of Historic Places
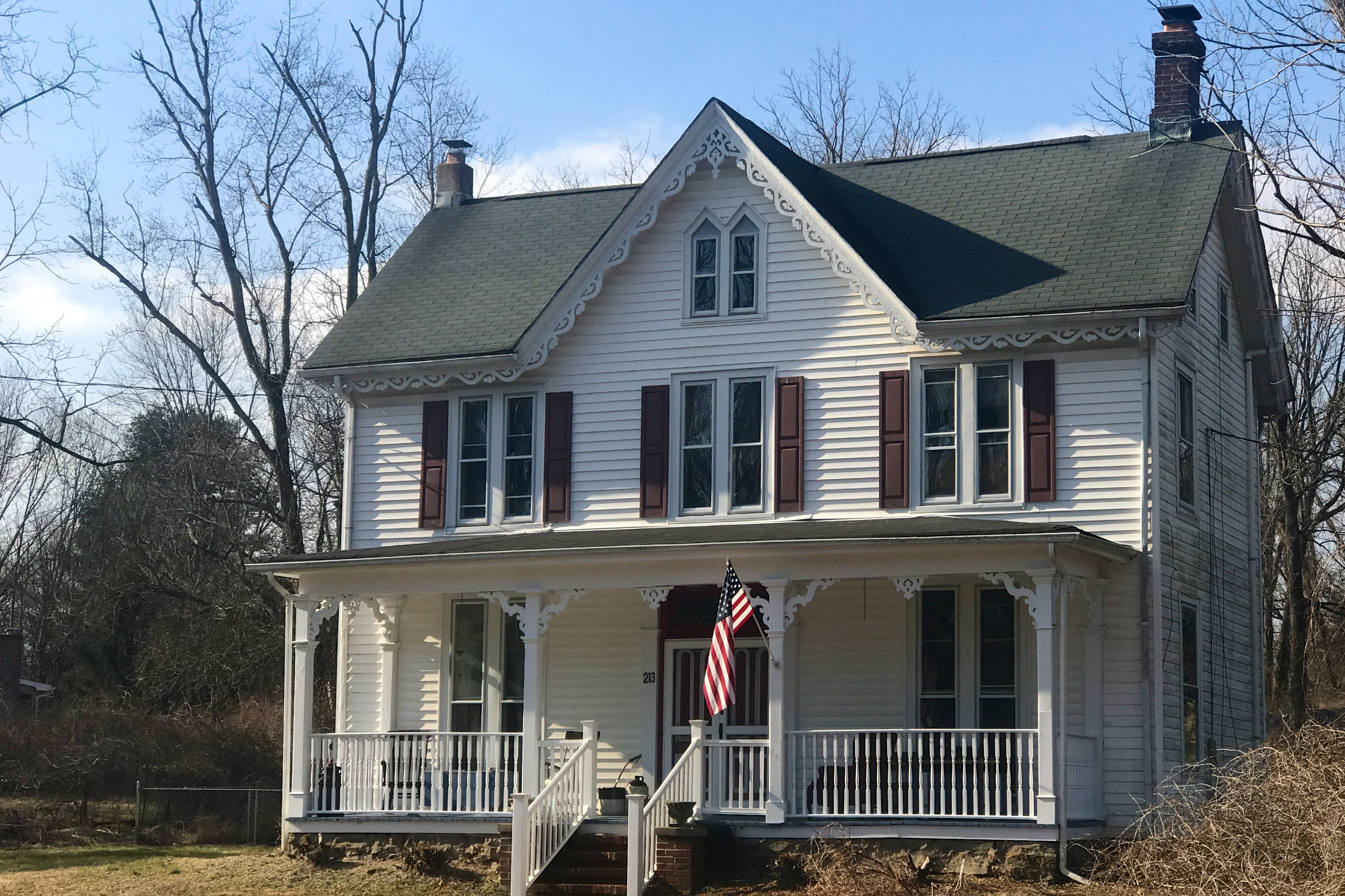
- Valley Presbyterian Church Parsonage

- Location within Warren County, New Jersey Location within Hunterdon County, New Jersey Location within New Jersey Location within the United States
- Nearest city: Hampton, New Jersey
- Coordinates: 40°42′47″N 74°58′07″W
- Area: 32 acres (13 ha)
- Architectural style: Gothic, Italianate, Federal
- NRHP reference No.: 91000306
- NJRHP No.: 2795

Significant dates
- Added to NRHP: March 27, 1991
- Designated NJRHP: February 6, 1991

The Imlaydale Historic District is a 32-acre (13 ha) historic district primarily in Washington Township of Warren County, New Jersey. It was added to the National Register of Historic Places on March 27, 1991 for its significance in architecture, community development, industry, politics/government, and transportation. The listing includes 12 contributing buildings, four contributing structures, and two contributing sites.

== History and description ==
The district includes essentially all of the village of Imlaydale in the Musconetcong River valley of southern Warren County. It includes Imlaydale Road and surrounding land between NJ 31 and the Musconetcong River, in Hampton borough and the townships of Washington and Lebanon.

The Valley Presbyterian Church Parsonage was built c. 1860–65 on land then owned by Noah Cramer. It features Gothic Revival architecture with Italianate influences.

== Gallery ==
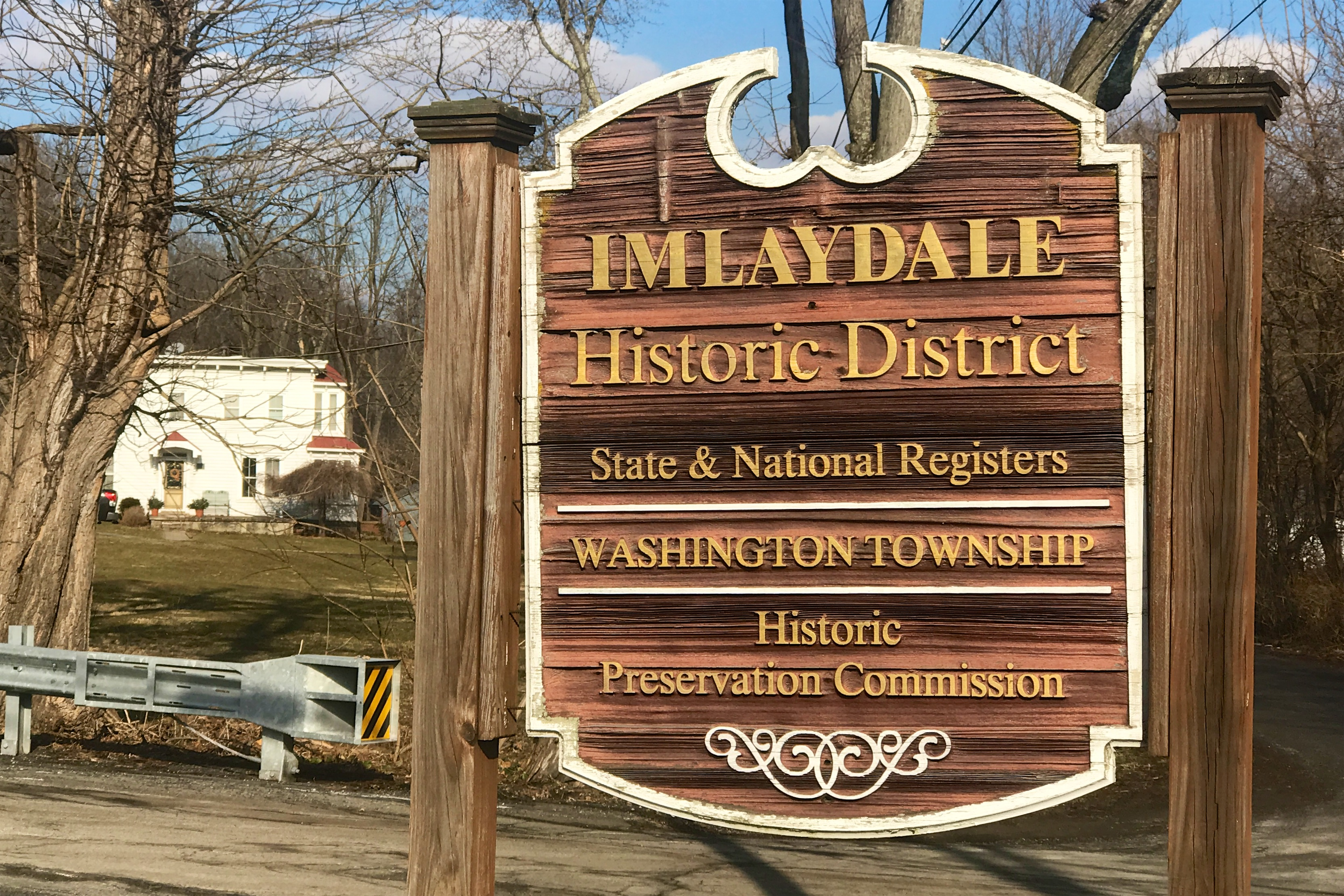
Area view

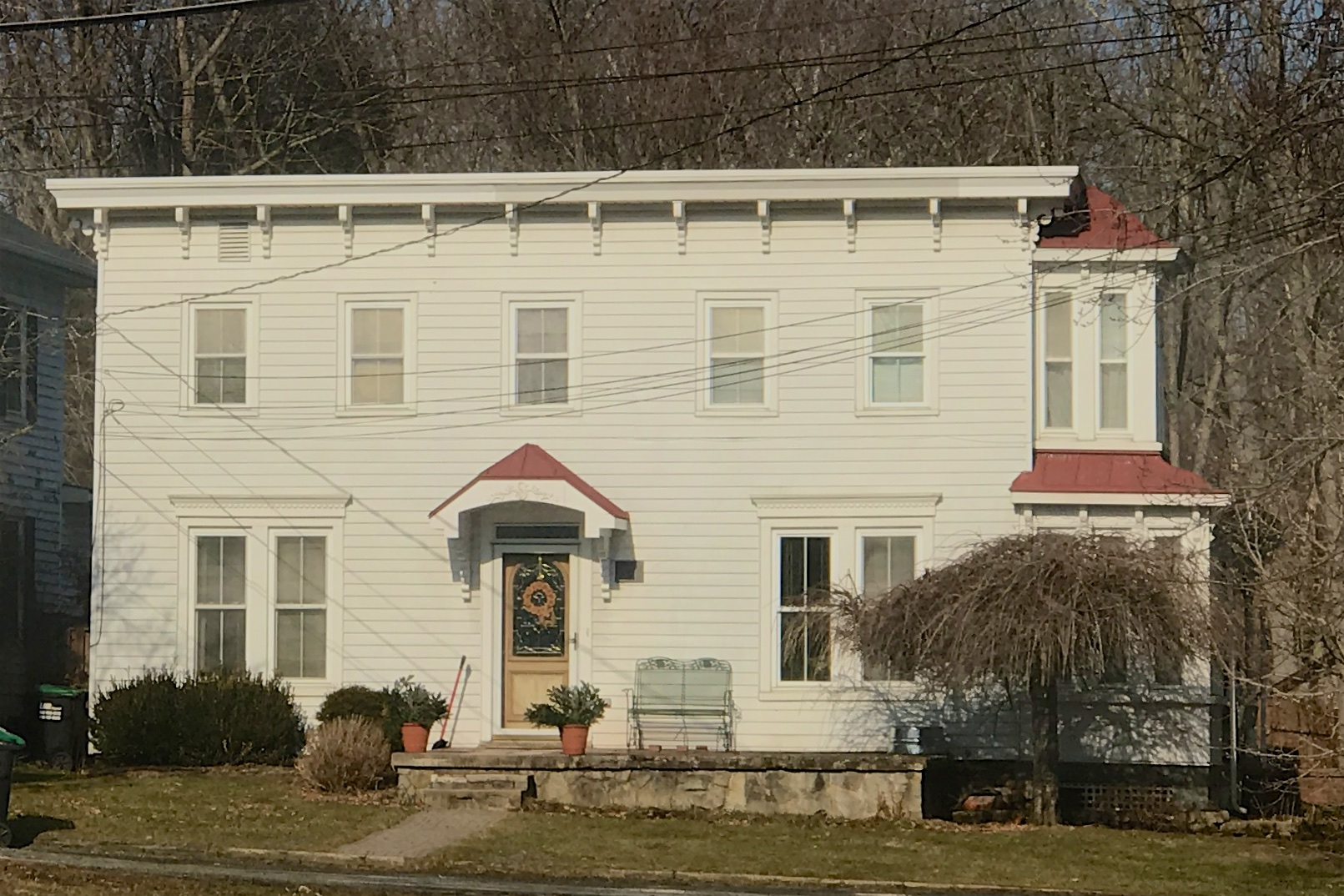
Italianate influenced house

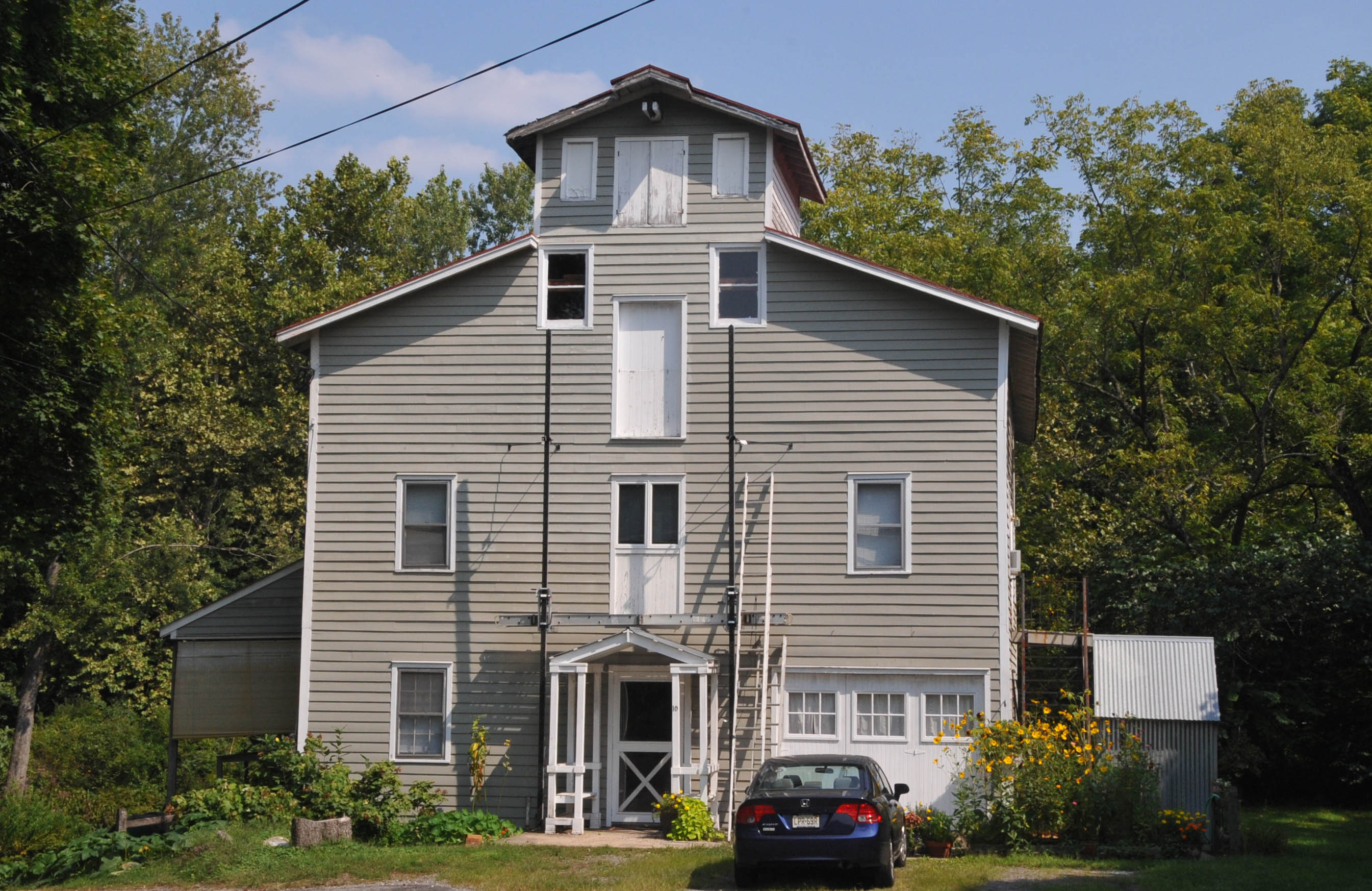
Former grist mill

== See also ==
- National Register of Historic Places listings in Hunterdon County, New Jersey
- National Register of Historic Places listings in Warren County, New Jersey
