= Port Colden, New Jersey =

Populated place in Warren County, New Jersey, US

- Census-designated place
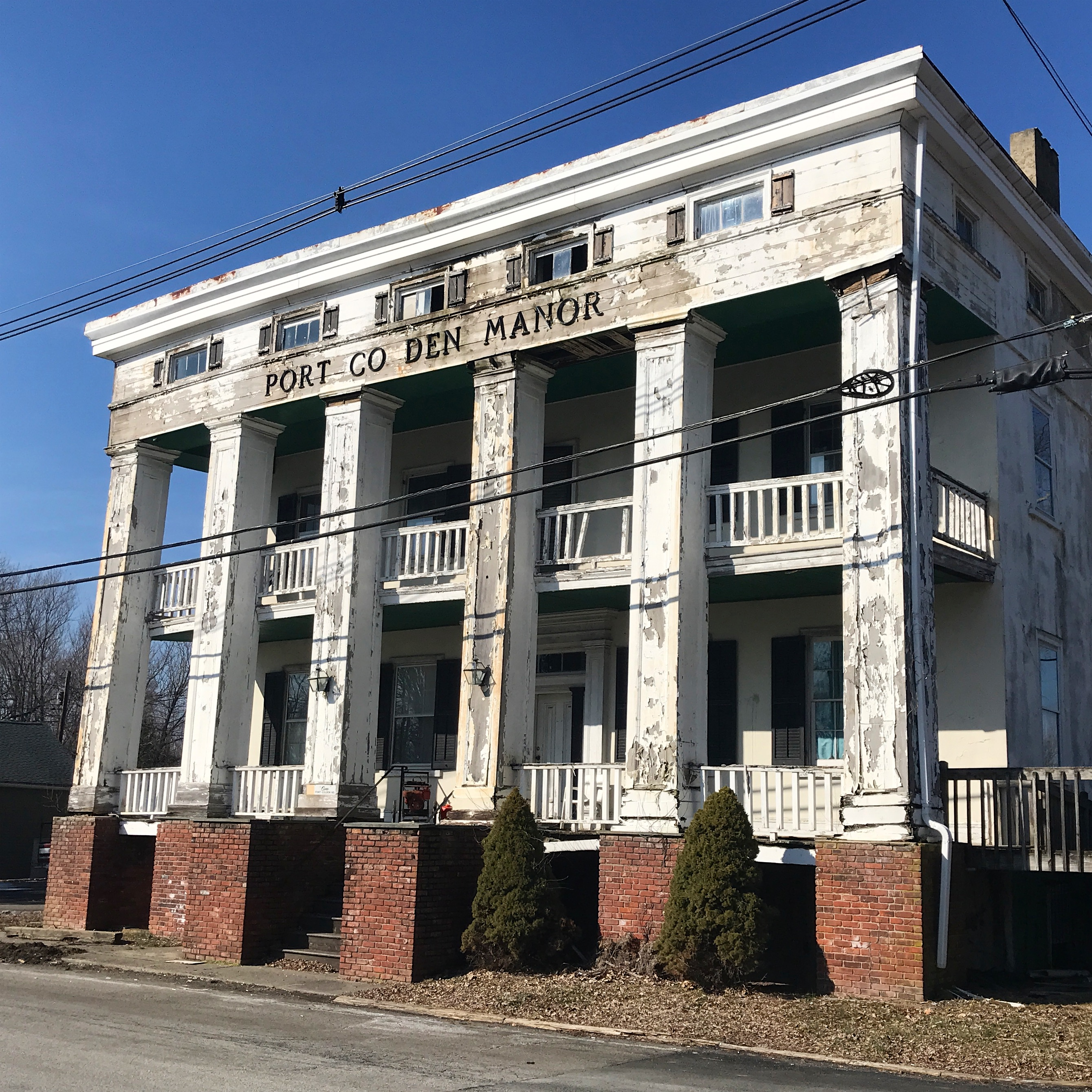
- Port Colden Manor in 2019

- Location in Warren County Location in New Jersey Location in the United States
- Coordinates: 40.768259°N 74.954121°W
- Country: United States
- State: New Jersey
- County: Warren
- Township: Washington
- Named for: Cadwallader D. Colden

Area
  - Total: 0.51 sq mi (1.32 km^{2})
  - Land: 0.51 sq mi (1.31 km^{2})
  - Water: 0.0039 sq mi (0.01 km^{2}) 0.00%
- Elevation: 531 ft (162 m)

Population (2020)
  - Total: 260
  - Density: 512.7/sq mi (197.95/km^{2})
- Time zone: UTC−05:00 (Eastern (EST))
  - Summer (DST): UTC−04:00 (EDT)
- Area code: 908
- FIPS code: 34-60210
- GNIS feature ID: 02584019

Port Colden is an unincorporated community and census-designated place (CDP) located within Washington Township, in Warren County, in the U.S. state of New Jersey, that was created as part of the 2010 United States census. As of the 2020 census, Port Colden had a population of 260.

The community was named for its location on the Morris Canal and after Cadwallader D. Colden, president of the Morris Canal Company.

== Geography ==
According to the United States Census Bureau, the CDP had a total area of 0.197 square miles (0.509 km^{2}), all of which was land.

== Demographics ==
Historical population
Census	Pop.	Note	%±
2010	122		—
2020	260		113.1%
U.S. Decennial Census; 2010 2020

Port Colden first appeared as a census designated place in the 2010 U.S. census.

=== 2020 census ===
Port Colden CDP, New Jersey – Racial and ethnic composition Note: the US Census treats Hispanic/Latino as an ethnic category. This table excludes Latinos from the racial categories and assigns them to a separate category. Hispanics/Latinos may be of any race.
Race / Ethnicity (NH = Non-Hispanic)	Pop 2010	Pop 2020	% 2010	% 2020
White alone (NH)	115	185	94.26%	71.15%
Black or African American alone (NH)	0	9	0.00%	3.46%
Native American or Alaska Native alone (NH)	2	1	1.64%	0.38%
Asian alone (NH)	1	7	0.82%	2.69%
Native Hawaiian or Pacific Islander alone (NH)	0	0	0.00%	0.00%
Other race alone (NH)	0	0	0.00%	0.00%
Mixed race or Multiracial (NH)	3	22	2.46%	8.46%
Hispanic or Latino (any race)	1	36	0.82%	13.85%
Total	122	260	100.00%	100.00%

=== 2010 census ===
The 2010 United States census counted 122 people, 55 households, and 34 families in the CDP. The population density was 620.4 per square mile (239.5/km^{2}). There were 59 housing units at an average density of 300.0 per square mile (115.8/km^{2}). The racial makeup was 95.08% (116) White, 0.00% (0) Black or African American, 1.64% (2) Native American, 0.82% (1) Asian, 0.00% (0) Pacific Islander, 0.00% (0) from other races, and 2.46% (3) from two or more races. Hispanic or Latino of any race were 0.82% (1) of the population.

Of the 55 households, 20.0% had children under the age of 18; 47.3% were married couples living together; 10.9% had a female householder with no husband present and 38.2% were non-families. Of all households, 29.1% were made up of individuals and 10.9% had someone living alone who was 65 years of age or older. The average household size was 2.22 and the average family size was 2.76.

16.4% of the population were under the age of 18, 8.2% from 18 to 24, 30.3% from 25 to 44, 32.8% from 45 to 64, and 12.3% who were 65 years of age or older. The median age was 43.5 years. For every 100 females, the population had 76.8 males. For every 100 females ages 18 and older there were 82.1 males.

== Historic district ==
The Port Colden Historic District was added to the National Register of Historic Places on January 21, 1999.

== Wineries ==
- Vacchiano Farm
