= Brass Castle, New Jersey =

Populated place in Warren County, New Jersey, US

- Census-designated place
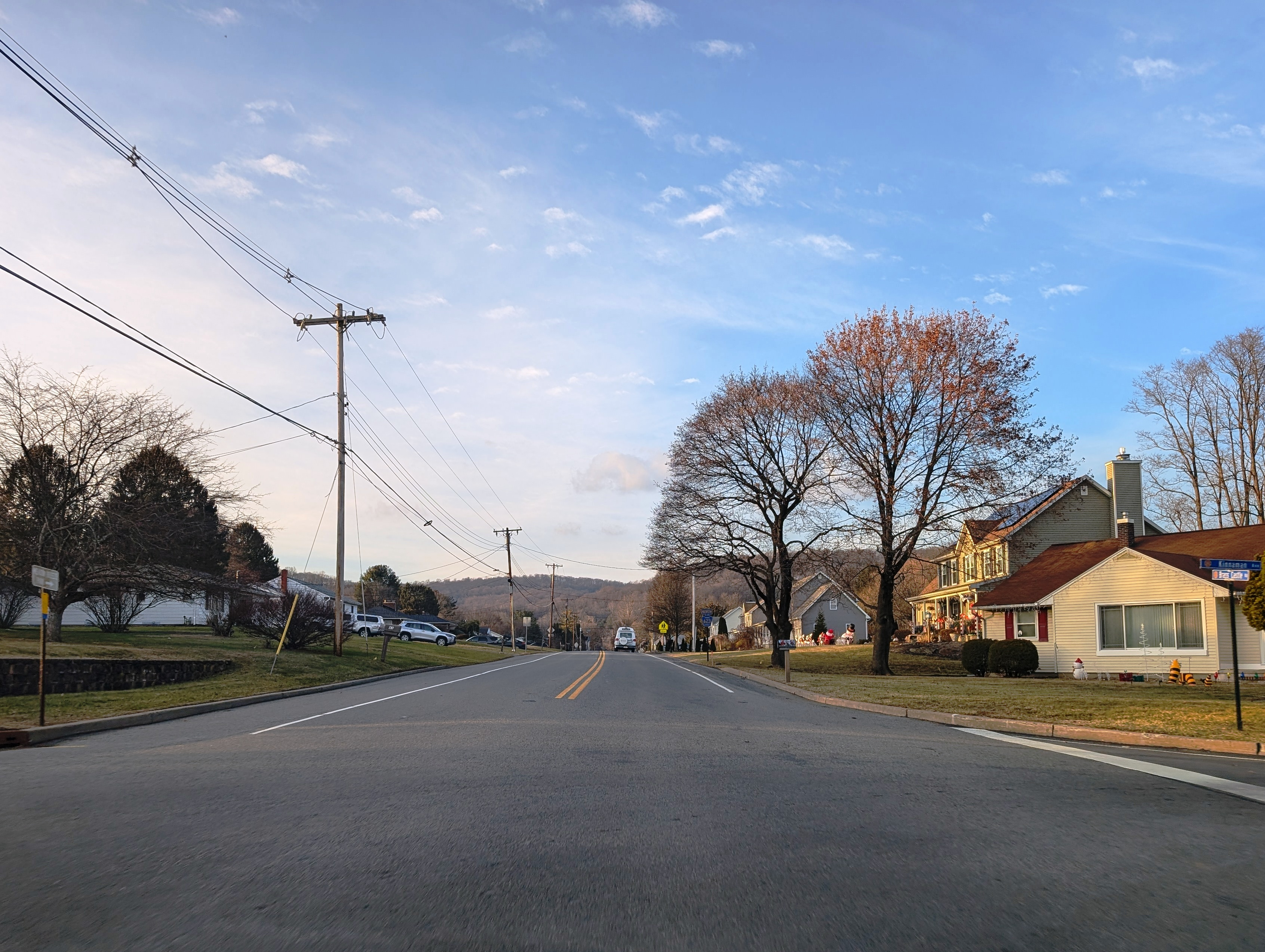
- CR 623 in Brass Castle Flag
- Map of Brass Castle CDP in Warren County

- Location in Warren County Location in New Jersey Location in the United States
- Coordinates: 40.763125°N 75.026248°W
- Country: United States
- State: New Jersey
- County: Warren
- Township: Washington
- Named after: Jacob Brass

Area
  - Total: 2.95 sq mi (7.65 km^{2})
  - Land: 2.94 sq mi (7.61 km^{2})
  - Water: 0.015 sq mi (0.04 km^{2}) 0.54%
- Elevation: 490 ft (150 m)

Population (2020)
  - Total: 1,536
  - Density: 522.7/sq mi (201.82/km^{2})
- Time zone: UTC−05:00 (Eastern (EST))
  - Summer (DST): UTC−04:00 (Eastern (EDT))
- Area code: 908
- FIPS code: 34-07360
- GNIS feature ID: 02389234

Brass Castle is an unincorporated community and census-designated place (CDP) located within Washington Township, in Warren County, in the U.S. state of New Jersey. As of the 2020 census, Brass Castle had a population of 1,536.

Brass Castle is named for Jacob Brass, an early settler of the area.

== Geography ==
According to the United States Census Bureau, Brass Castle had a total area of 2.934 square miles (7.60 km^{2}), including 2.918 square miles (7.56 km^{2}) of land and 0.016 square miles (0.041 km^{2}) of water (0.54%).

== Demographics ==
Historical population
Census	Pop.	Note	%±
1990	1,419		—
2000	1,507		6.2%
2010	1,555		3.2%
2020	1,536		−1.2%
Population sources: 1950 1960 1970; 1980 1990 2000; 2010 2020

Brass Castle first appeared as a census designated place in the 1990 U.S. census.

=== 2020 census ===
Brass Castle CDP, New Jersey – Racial and ethnic composition Note: the US Census treats Hispanic/Latino as an ethnic category. This table excludes Latinos from the racial categories and assigns them to a separate category. Hispanics/Latinos may be of any race.
Race / Ethnicity (NH = Non-Hispanic)	Pop 2000	Pop 2010	Pop 2020	% 2000	% 2010	% 2020
White alone (NH)	1,463	1,447	1,339	97.08%	93.05%	87.17%
Black or African American alone (NH)	13	25	42	0.86%	1.61%	2.73%
Native American or Alaska Native alone (NH)	0	1	0	0.00%	0.06%	0.00%
Asian alone (NH)	4	22	19	0.27%	1.41%	1.24%
Native Hawaiian or Pacific Islander alone (NH)	0	0	1	0.00%	0.00%	0.07%
Other race alone (NH)	0	0	5	0.00%	0.00%	0.33%
Mixed race or Multiracial (NH)	2	10	36	0.13%	0.64%	2.34%
Hispanic or Latino (any race)	25	50	94	1.66%	3.22%	6.12%
Total	1,507	1,555	1,536	100.00%	100.00%	100.00%

=== 2010 census ===
The 2010 United States census counted 1,555 people, 552 households, and 452 families in the CDP. The population density was 532.9 people per square mile (205.8 people/km^{2}). There were 575 housing units at an average density of 197.1 units per square mile (76.1 units/km^{2}). The racial makeup was 95.95% (1,492) White, 1.61% (25) Black or African American, 0.06% (1) Native American, 1.48% (23) Asian, 0.00% (0) Pacific Islander, 0.26% (4) from other races, and 0.64% (10) from two or more races. Hispanic or Latino of any race were 3.22% (50) of the population.

Of the 552 households, 33.5% had children under the age of 18; 73.9% were married couples living together; 6.0% had a female householder with no husband present and 18.1% were non-families. Of all households, 15.8% were made up of individuals and 8.2% had someone living alone who was 65 years of age or older. The average household size was 2.82 and the average family size was 3.15.

25.1% of the population were under the age of 18, 6.2% from 18 to 24, 22.9% from 25 to 44, 32.5% from 45 to 64, and 13.2% who were 65 years of age or older. The median age was 41.9 years. For every 100 females, the population had 95.1 males. For every 100 females ages 18 and older there were 97.8 males.

=== 2000 census ===
As of the 2000 United States census there were 1,507 people, 517 households, and 436 families living in the CDP. The population density was 199.3 people/km^{2} (516 people/mi^{2}). There were 535 housing units at an average density of 70.7 units/km^{2} (183 units/mi^{2}). The racial makeup of the CDP was 98.21% White, 0.93% African American, 0.27% Asian, 0.46% from other races, and 0.13% from two or more races. Hispanic or Latino of any race were 1.66% of the population.

There were 517 households, out of which 42.4% had children under the age of 18 living with them, 75.2% were married couples living together, 6.6% had a female householder with no husband present, and 15.5% were non-families. 13.5% of all households were made up of individuals, and 7.9% had someone living alone who was 65 years of age or older. The average household size was 2.91 and the average family size was 3.18.

In the CDP the population was spread out, with 28.4% under the age of 18, 5.6% from 18 to 24, 28.4% from 25 to 44, 25.3% from 45 to 64, and 12.3% who were 65 years of age or older. The median age was 39 years. For every 100 females, there were 94.5 males. For every 100 females age 18 and over, there were 95.1 males.

The median income for a household in the CDP was $79,227, and the median income for a family was $84,783. Males had a median income of $51,689 versus $35,690 for females. The per capita income for the CDP was $32,393. About 5.1% of families and 4.3% of the population were below the poverty line, including 7.5% of those under age 18 and none of those age 65 or over.
