= Pleasant Valley, Warren County, New Jersey =

Populated place in Warren County, New Jersey, US

Pleasant Valley, New Jersey
- Unincorporated community
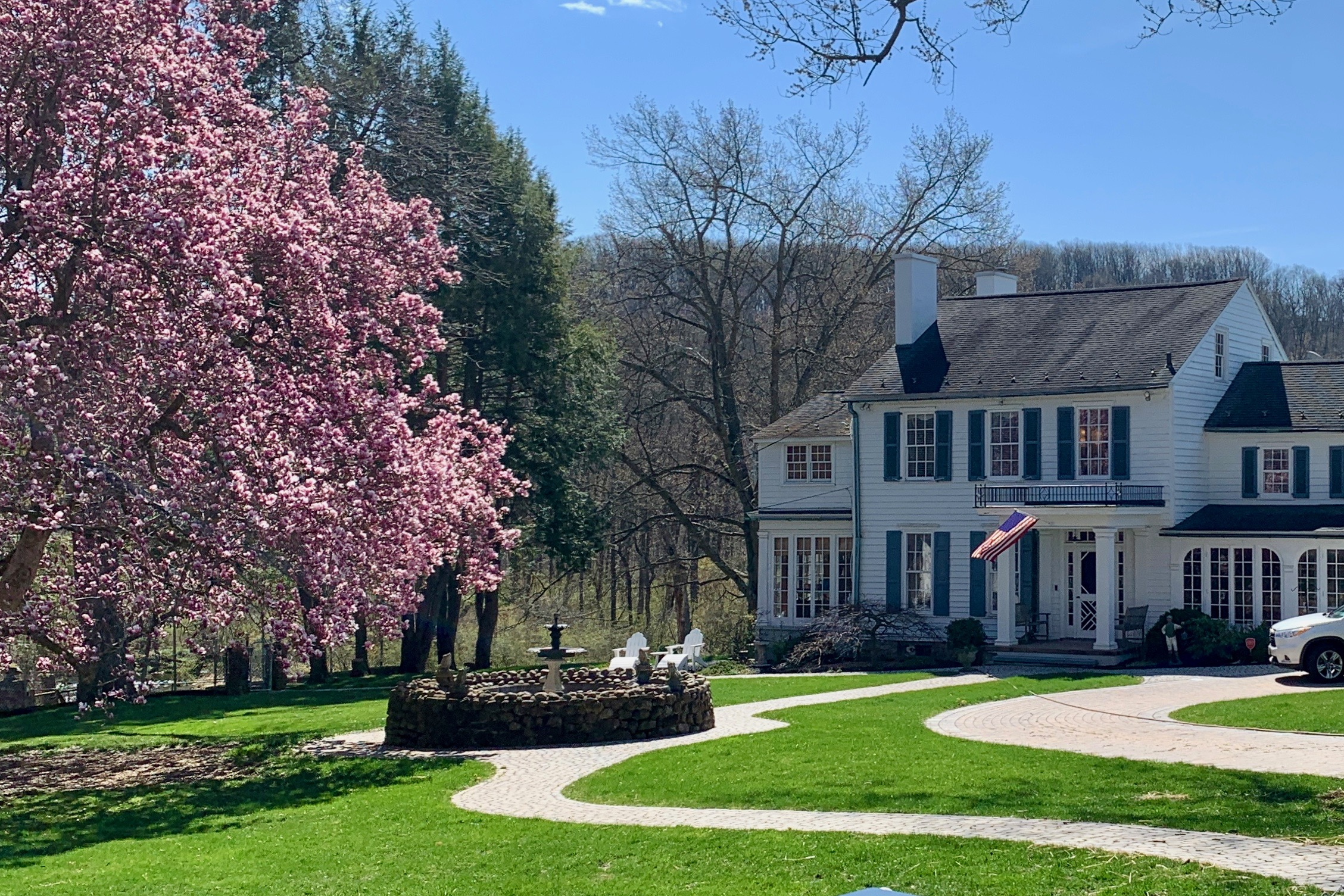
- Historic house, Mill Pond Road

- Location within Warren County, New Jersey Location within New Jersey Location within the United States
- Coordinates: 40°45′05″N 75°00′30″W
- Country: United States
- State: New Jersey
- County: Warren
- Township: Washington
- GNIS feature ID: 879366

Pleasant Valley is an unincorporated community located in Washington Township, Warren County, New Jersey, west of Washington, along the Pohatcong Creek. The hamlet was built around a mill on the creek during the mid-18th century. The Pleasant Valley Historic District, encompassing the village, is listed on the state and national registers of historic places.

== History ==
In 1754, Thomas Van Horn acquired a large tract of land in the Pohatcong valley from John Moore and later built a mill on the creek. After his death, the mill was eventually bought by John Sherrerd in 1791. John's son, Samuel Sherrerd, inherited the property in 1810. Samuel's wife, Ann Maxwell, was the daughter of Captain John Maxwell and the niece of General William Maxwell, both officers in the Continental Army. Their son, John Maxwell Sherrerd, was appointed the first Surrogate of Warren County. William M. Warne, husband of daughter, Susan Sherrerd, bought the property in 1833 after Samuel's death. He is listed as building the main block of the house at 14 Mill Pond Road in 1834.

With the completion of the Morris Canal, which bypassed Pleasant Valley and favored Washington, the area had little growth. In 1865, Dr. J. V. Mattison purchased the property from the Warne family and rebuilt the mill. In 1893, William Larison bought the property. After several exchanges, the property was bought by Earle S. Eckel in 1926.

Eckel made several changes to the property. He dredged and enlarged the mill pond, and upgraded the dam and causeway with the goal of generating hydroelectric power. After the mill burned down in 1929, he built a brick and steel power house on the old mill foundation for the turbine and generator. Eckel was also interested in aviation, in particular the autogiro by Harold Pitcairn. In 1931, he purchased one and built a runway and hangar for it, probably the first exclusive autogiro airport in America. During National Air Mail Week, he carried mail postmarked: "Via Air Mail. First Flight. From Washington, N.J. May 19, 1938" to Newark, New Jersey using his own Pitcairn PAA-1. Eckel was one of the founding members and the first vice president of the Antique Automobile Club of America in 1935.

== Historic district ==
- Pleasant Valley Historic District
- U.S. National Register of Historic Places
- U.S. Historic district
- New Jersey Register of Historic Places
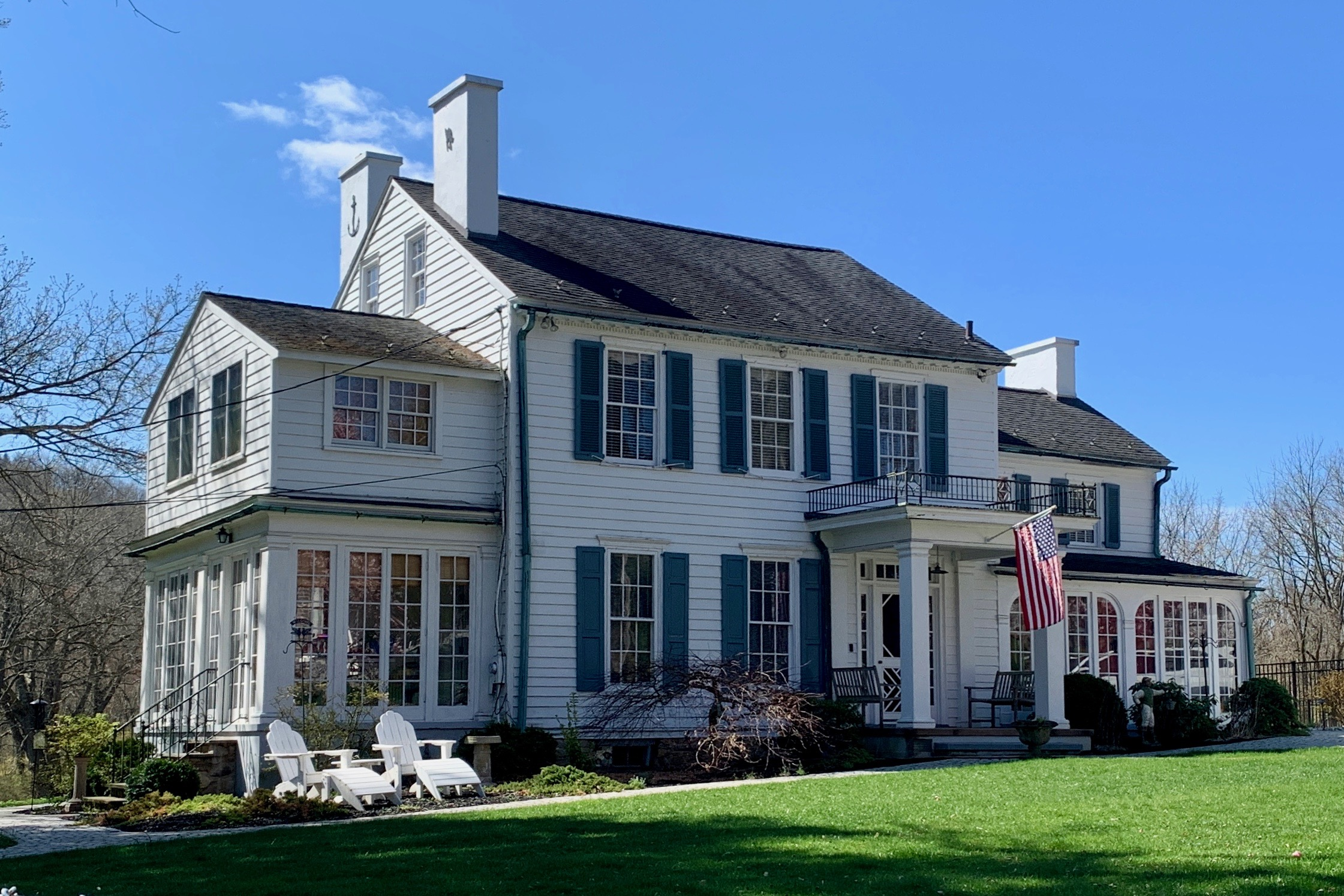
- Sherrerd/Warne/Eckel House, built 1834
- Location: Area surrounding Mill Pond Road; Pleasant Valley, Warren County, New Jersey
- Coordinates: 40°44′57″N 75°00′21″W
- Area: 40 acres (16 ha)
- Architectural style: Colonial Revival, Greek Revival, Federal
- NRHP reference No.: 94000013
- NJRHP No.: 2797

Significant dates
- Added to NRHP: February 17, 1994
- Designated NJRHP: December 20, 1993

The Pleasant Valley Historic District is a historic district along Mill Pond Road in Pleasant Valley, Warren County, New Jersey. The district was added to the National Register of Historic Places on February 17, 1994 for its significance in engineering, transportation, and architecture from 1830 to 1942. It includes 20 contributing resources.

The Sherrerd/Warne/Eckel House shows Federal/Greek Revival styles with Colonial Revival remodeling. It features a round cobblestone fountain basin, built c. 1930. The Power House has a round cobblestone planter with flagpole.

== Gallery ==
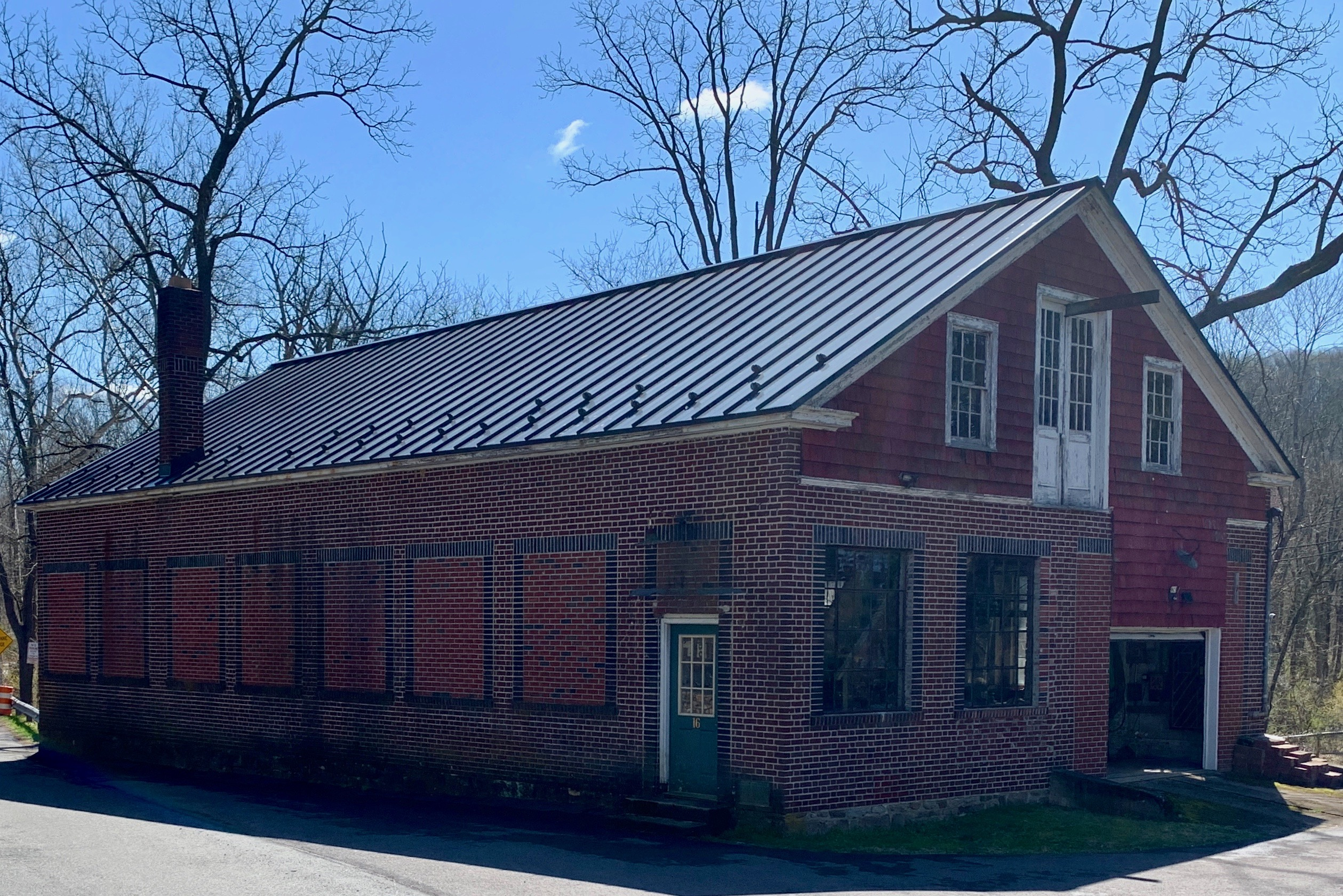
Power House, built 1930

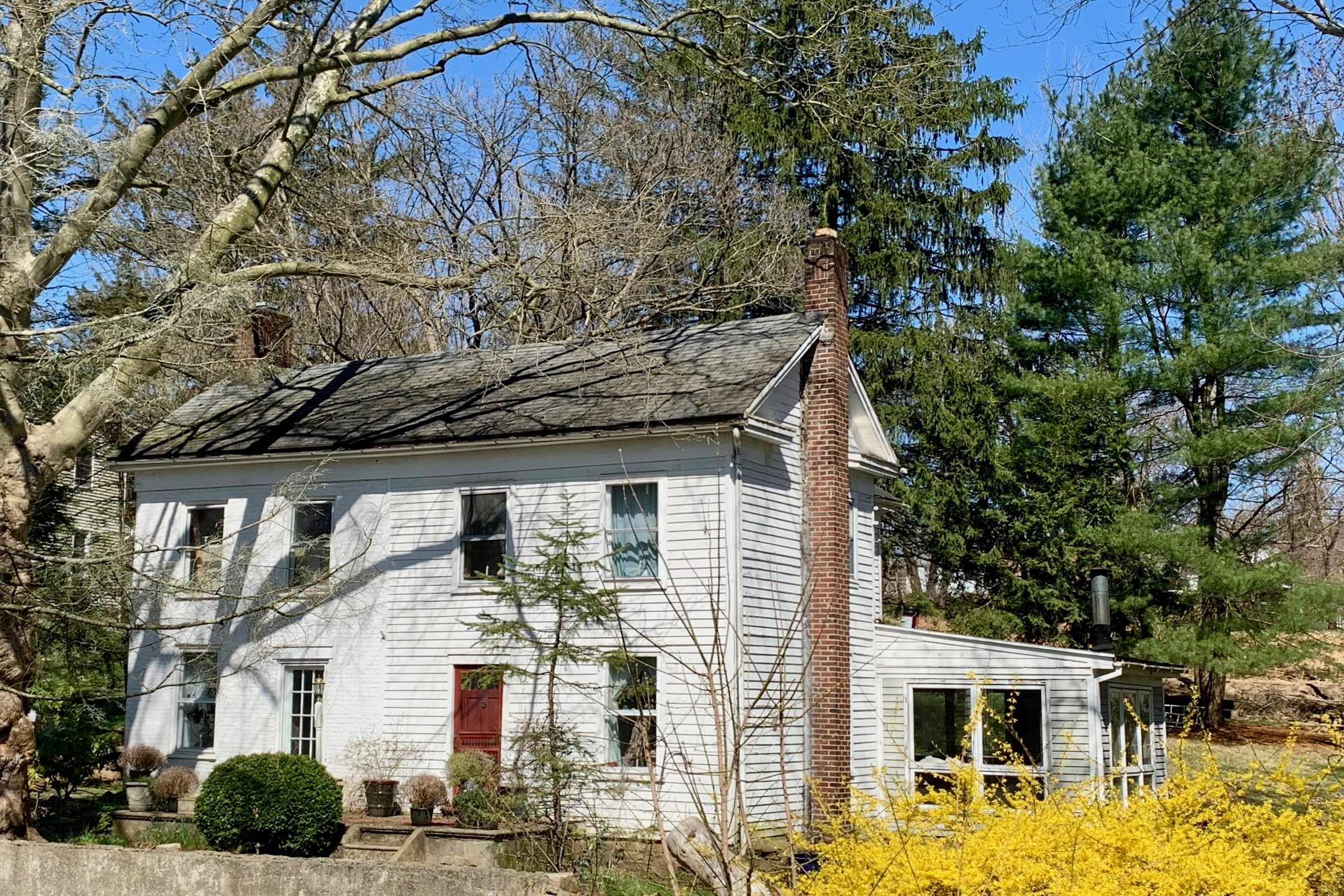
House by Mill Pond dam, built 1865

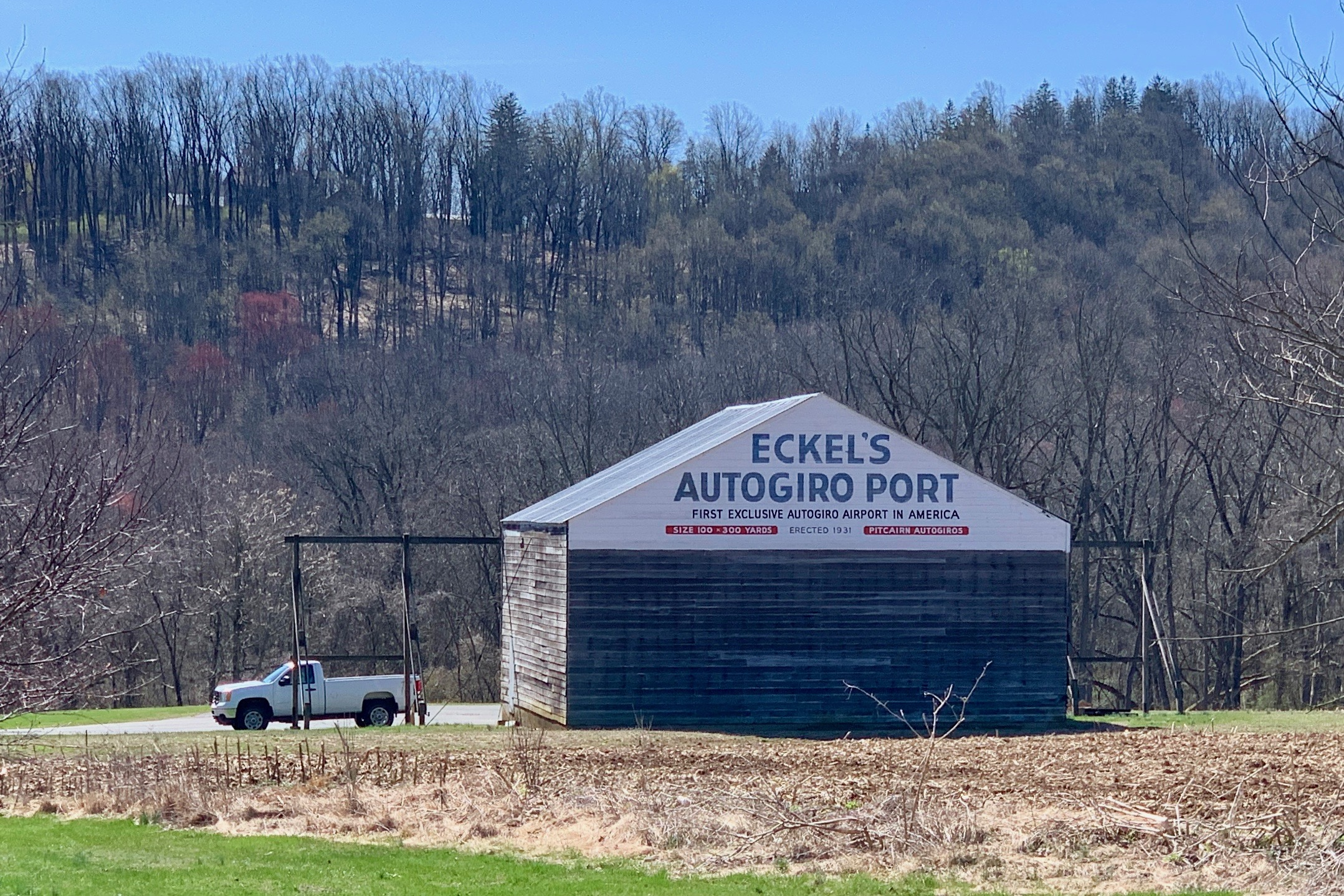
Eckel's Autogiro Port, built 1931

== See also ==
- National Register of Historic Places listings in Warren County, New Jersey
