= John Brodhead =

John Brodhead may refer to:

- John Curtis Brodhead (1780–1859), U.S. Representative from New York
- John Romeyn Brodhead (1814–1873), American historical scholar
- John Brodhead (New Hampshire politician) (1770–1838), U.S. Representative from New Hampshire
- John Henry Brodhead (1898–1951), African American pioneer in the field of psychology
