= Warren County Technical School District =

School district in Warren County, New Jersey, US

Address
- 1500 Route 57 Washington, Warren County, New Jersey, 07882
- Coordinates: 40.745226°N 75.022712°W

District information
- Grades: Vocational
- Superintendent: Derrick Forsythe (acting)
- Business administrator: Amy Barkman
- Schools: 1

Students and staff
- Enrollment: 405 (as of 2022–23)
- Faculty: 38.5 FTEs
- Student–teacher ratio: 10.5:1

Other information
- Website: Official website
Ind.	Per pupil	District spending	Rank (*)	Vocational average	%± vs. average
1A	Total Spending	$24,071	16	$18,891	27.4%
1	Budgetary Cost	14,078	6	17,296	−18.6%
2	Classroom Instruction	8,112	9	9,045	−10.3%
6	Support Services	1,122	2	2,269	−50.6%
8	Administrative Cost	2,375	10	2,353	0.9%
10	Operations & Maintenance	2,075	3	3,014	−31.2%
13	Extracurricular Activities	382	11	464	−17.7%
16	Median Teacher Salary	56,046	3	65,035
Data from NJDoE 2014 Taxpayers' Guide to Education Spending. *Of Vocational districts with any number of students. Lowest spending=1; Highest=21

The Warren County Technical School District is a technical and vocational public school district serving students in ninth through twelfth grades, along with programs for adult learners, located in Washington borough, and serving the entire community of Warren County, in the U.S. state of New Jersey.

As of the 2022–23 school year, the district, comprised of one school, had an enrollment of 405 students and 38.5 classroom teachers (on an FTE basis), for a student–teacher ratio of 10.5:1.

The district offers "a comprehensive high school education, athletics, and student life found at a traditional high school setting with the added focus of vocational and career training based on current industry standards"

== School ==
Warren County Technical School had an enrollment of 413 students as of the 2022-23 school year. The student's local school district is responsible for tuition and to provide transportation to the school.

- Derrick Forsythe, principal

== Administration ==
Core members of the district's administration are:

- Derrick Forsythe, acting superintendent
- Amy Barkman, business administrator
