= Frelinghuysen Township, New Jersey =

Township in Warren County, New Jersey, US

- Township
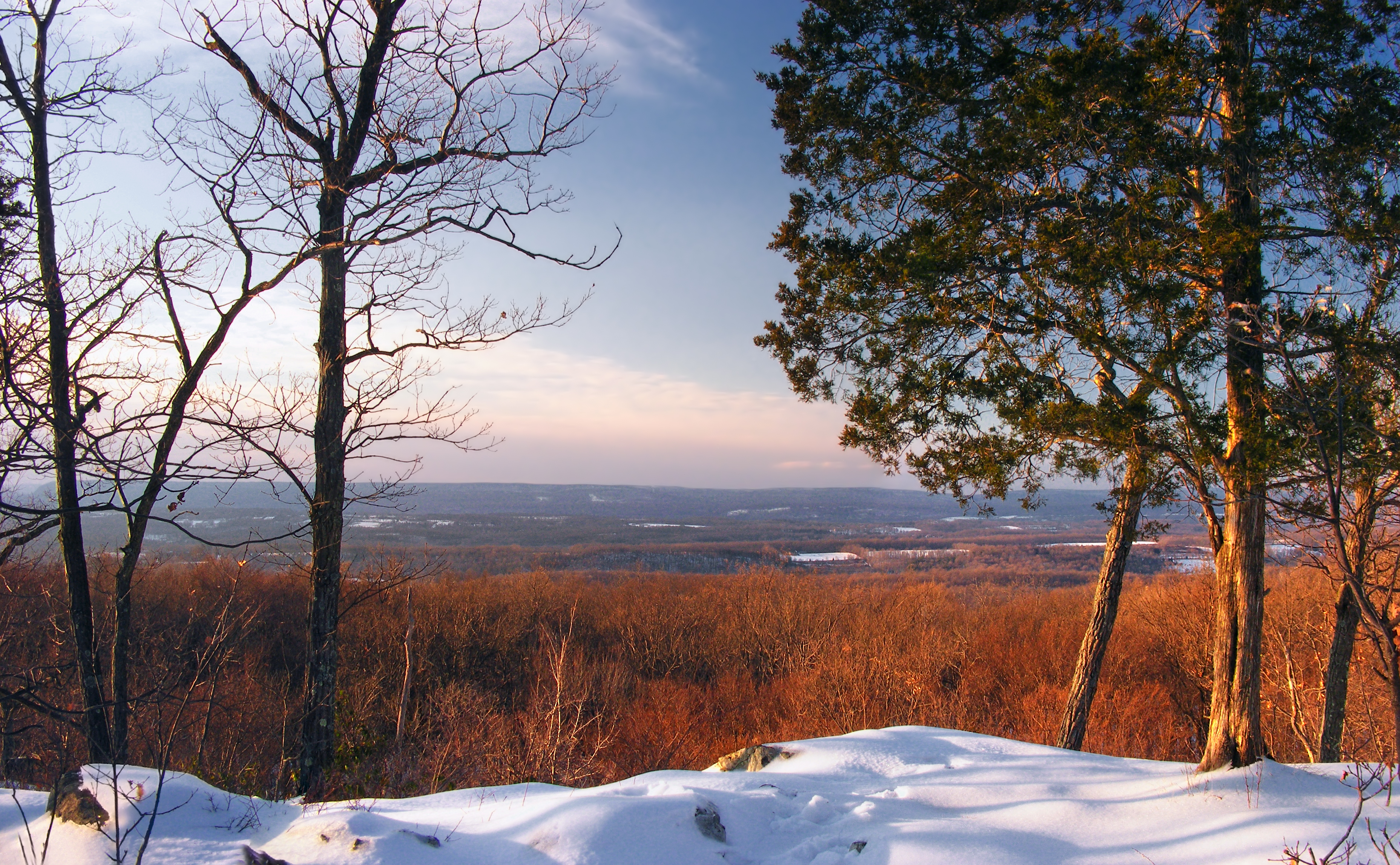
- Vista from Jenny Jump Mountain

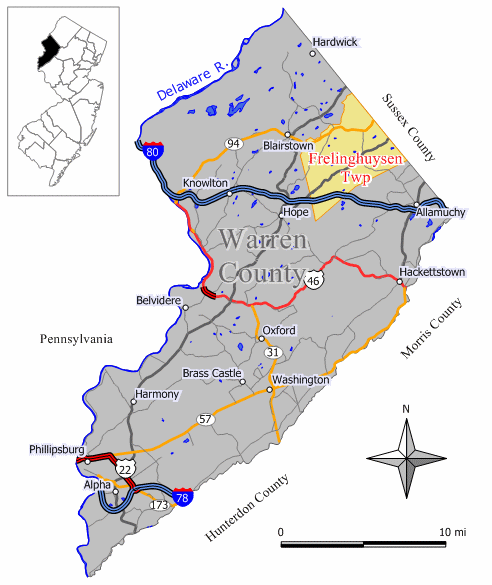
- Location of Frelinghuysen Township in Warren County highlighted in yellow (right). Inset map: Location of Warren County in New Jersey highlighted in black (left).

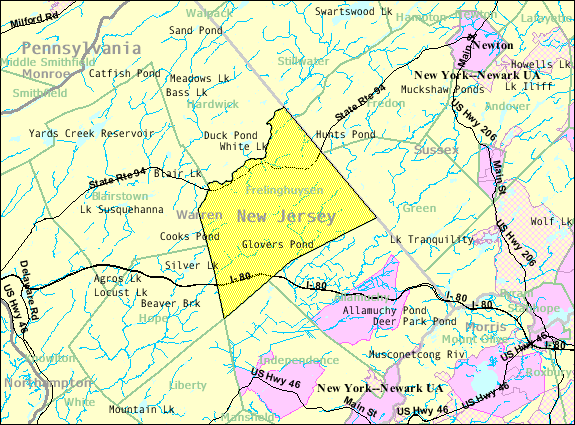
- Census Bureau map of Frelinghuysen Township, New Jersey

- Location in Warren County Location in New Jersey Location in the United States
- Coordinates: 40.959486°N 74.895154°W
- Country: United States
- state: New Jersey
- County: Warren
- Incorporated: March 7, 1848
- Named for: Theodorus Jacobus Frelinghuysen

Government
  - Type: Township
  - Body: Township Committee
  - Mayor: Keith Ramos (R, term ends December 31, 2023)
  - Municipal clerk: Donna Zilberfarb

Area
  - Total: 23.87 sq mi (61.83 km^{2})
  - Land: 23.62 sq mi (61.18 km^{2})
  - Water: 0.25 sq mi (0.65 km^{2}) 1.04%
  - Rank: 117th of 565 in state 7th of 22 in county
- Elevation: 689 ft (210 m)

Population (2020)
  - Total: 2,199
  - Estimate (2023): 2,224
  - Rank: 479th of 565 in state 20th of 22 in county
  - Density: 93.1/sq mi (35.9/km^{2})
  - Rank: 544th of 565 in state 21st of 22 in county
- Time zone: UTC−05:00 (Eastern (EST))
  - Summer (DST): UTC−04:00 (Eastern (EDT))
- ZIP Code: 07846 – Johnsonburg
- Area code: 908 exchanges: 850, 852
- FIPS code: 3404125320
- GNIS feature ID: 0882240
- Website: www.frelinghuysen-nj.us

Frelinghuysen Township (/ˈfriːlɪŋhaɪzən/ FREE-ling-hy-zən) is a township in Warren County, in the U.S. state of New Jersey. As of the 2020 United States census, the township's population was 2,199, a decrease of 31 (−1.4%) from the 2010 census count of 2,230, which in turn reflected an increase of 147 (+7.1%) from the 2,083 counted in the 2000 census.

== History ==
Frelinghuysen Township was incorporated from portions of Hardwick Township on March 7, 1848. According to the book Historical Sites of Warren County, the township was named for Theodorus Jacobus Frelinghuysen, a minister and theologian of the Dutch Reformed Church who came to New Jersey in 1720. Theodorus was the grandfather of Theodore Frelinghuysen, the noted statesman, educator and running mate of presidential candidate Henry Clay on the Whig Party ticket in the 1844 election, who is also credited as the inspiration for the township's name.

== Geography ==
According to the United States Census Bureau, the township had a total area of 23.87 square miles (61.83 km^{2}), including 23.62 square miles (61.18 km^{2}) of land and 0.25 square miles (0.65 km^{2}) of water (1.04%).

Johnsonburg (with a 2020 Census population of 381) and Marksboro (population of 186 in 2020) are unincorporated communities and census-designated places (CDPs) located within the township. Other unincorporated communities, localities and place names located partially or completely within the township include Ebenezer, Glovers Pond, Kerrs Corners, Shiloh, Southtown and Yellow Frame.

The township is located in the Kittatinny Valley which is a section of the Great Appalachian Valley that stretches for 700 miles (1,100 km) from Canada to Alabama.

Frelinghuysen Township borders the municipalities of Allamuchy Township, Blairstown, Hardwick Township, Hope Township and Independence Township in Warren County; and Fredon Township, Green Township and Stillwater Township in Sussex County.

== Demographics ==
Historical population
| Census | Pop. | Note | %± |
|---|---|---|---|
| 1850 | 1,277 | | — |
| 1860 | 1,297 | | 1.6% |
| 1870 | 1,113 | | −14.2% |
| 1880 | 1,042 | | −6.4% |
| 1890 | 879 | | −15.6% |
| 1900 | 797 | | −9.3% |
| 1910 | 1,074 | | 34.8% |
| 1920 | 682 | | −36.5% |
| 1930 | 696 | | 2.1% |
| 1940 | 715 | | 2.7% |
| 1950 | 779 | | 9.0% |
| 1960 | 845 | | 8.5% |
| 1970 | 1,118 | | 32.3% |
| 1980 | 1,435 | | 28.4% |
| 1990 | 1,779 | | 24.0% |
| 2000 | 2,083 | | 17.1% |
| 2010 | 2,230 | | 7.1% |
| 2020 | 2,199 | | −1.4% |
| 2023 (est.) | 2,224 | | 1.1% |
Population sources: 1850–1920 1850–1870; 1850 1870 1880–1890; 1890–1910 1910–1930; 1940–2000 2000; 2010 2020

The township's economic data (as is all of Warren County) is calculated by the US Census Bureau as part of the Allentown-Bethlehem-Easton, PA-NJ Metropolitan Statistical Area.

=== 2010 census ===
The 2010 United States census counted 2,230 people, 760 households, and 615 families in the township. The population density was 95.6 per square mile (36.9/km^{2}). There were 826 housing units at an average density of 35.4 per square mile (13.7/km^{2}). The racial makeup was 97.22% (2,168) White, 0.63% (14) Black or African American, 0.00% (0) Native American, 0.54% (12) Asian, 0.00% (0) Pacific Islander, 0.58% (13) from other races, and 1.03% (23) from two or more races. Hispanic or Latino of any race were 2.56% (57) of the population.

Of the 760 households, 32.6% had children under the age of 18; 69.1% were married couples living together; 8.3% had a female householder with no husband present and 19.1% were non-families. Of all households, 13.6% were made up of individuals and 5.1% had someone living alone who was 65 years of age or older. The average household size was 2.76 and the average family size was 3.07.

21.6% of the population were under the age of 18, 5.8% from 18 to 24, 19.6% from 25 to 44, 35.2% from 45 to 64, and 17.8% who were 65 years of age or older. The median age was 46.3 years. For every 100 females, the population had 92.2 males. For every 100 females ages 18 and older there were 90.4 males.

The Census Bureau's 2006–2010 American Community Survey showed that (in 2010 inflation-adjusted dollars) median household income was $94,688 (with a margin of error of +/− $10,942) and the median family income was $104,712 (+/− $8,336). Males had a median income of $81,667 (+/− $4,051) versus $53,857 (+/− $2,542) for females. The per capita income for the borough was $39,316 (+/− $3,207). About 2.2% of families and 5.1% of the population were below the poverty line, including 6.7% of those under age 18 and 3.8% of those age 65 or over.

=== 2000 census ===
As of the 2000 United States census, there were 2,083 people, 722 households, and 578 families residing in the township. The population density was 88.9 inhabitants per square mile (34.3/km^{2}). There were 755 housing units at an average density of 32.2 per square mile (12.4/km^{2}). The racial makeup of the township was 97.79% White, 0.34% African American, 0.05% Native American, 0.38% Asian, 0.19% Pacific Islander, 0.48% from other races, and 0.77% from two or more races. Hispanic or Latino of any race were 2.64% of the population.

There were 722 households, out of which 37.5% had children under the age of 18 living with them, 71.5% were married couples living together, 5.7% had a female householder with no husband present, and 19.9% were non-families. 14.5% of all households were made up of individuals, and 4.7% had someone living alone who was 65 years of age or older. The average household size was 2.81 and the average family size was 3.13.

In the township the population was spread out, with 26.1% under the age of 18, 4.8% from 18 to 24, 28.4% from 25 to 44, 29.7% from 45 to 64, and 11.0% who were 65 years of age or older. The median age was 40 years. For every 100 females, there were 97.4 males. For every 100 females age 18 and over, there were 94.0 males.

The median income for a household in the township was $72,434, and the median income for a family was $78,464. Males had a median income of $56,818 versus $36,827 for females. The per capita income for the township was $28,792. About 1.1% of families and 2.3% of the population were below the poverty line, including 0.6% of those under age 18 and 1.5% of those age 65 or over.

== Government ==
=== Local government ===
Frelinghuysen Township is governed under the Township form of New Jersey municipal government, one of 141 municipalities (of the 564) statewide that use this form, the second-most commonly used form of government in the state. The Township Committee is comprised of five members, who are elected directly by the voters at-large in partisan elections to serve three-year terms of office on a staggered basis, with either one or two seats coming up for election each year as part of the November general election in a three-year cycle. The committee has an organizational meeting each January to appoint a Mayor and Deputy Mayor from among its members. These officers serve for one year, until the next organizational meeting.

As of 2022, members of the Frelinghuysen Township Committee are Mayor Keith C. Ramos (R, term on committee and as mayor ends December 31, 2022), Deputy Mayor Christopher Stracco (R, term on committee ends 2024; term as deputy mayor ends 2022), David C. Boynton (R, 2023), Todd McPeek (R, 2024) and Robert Stock (R, 2022; appointed to serve an unexpired term).

In January 2022, Robert Stack was sworn in to fill the seat expiring in December 2022 that had been held by Frank D. Desiderio Jr. until his resignation the previous month.

=== Federal, state, and county representation ===
Frelinghuysen Township is located in the 7th Congressional District and is part of New Jersey's 23rd state legislative district. For the 119th United States Congress, New Jersey's 7th congressional district is represented by Thomas Kean Jr. (R, Westfield). New Jersey is represented in the United States Senate by Democrats Cory Booker (Newark, term ends 2027) and Andy Kim (Moorestown, term ends 2031).

For the 2026–2027 session, the 23rd legislative district of the New Jersey Legislature is represented in the State Senate by Doug Steinhardt (R, Lopatcong Township) and in the General Assembly by John DiMaio (R, Hackettstown) and Erik Peterson (R, Franklin Township).

Warren County is governed by a three-member Board of County Commissioners, who are chosen at-large on a staggered basis in partisan elections with one seat coming up for election each year as part of the November general election. At an annual reorganization meeting held in the beginning of January, the board selects one of its members to serve as Commissioner Director and other as Deputy Director. As of 2025, Warren County's Commissioners are:

Deputy Director Jason J. Sarnoski (R, Lopatcong Township; 2025), Lori Ciesla (R, Lopatcong Township; 2026), and Director James R. Kern III (R, Pohatcong Township; 2027).

Constitutional officers of Warren County are: Clerk Holly Mackey (R, Alpha; 2027), Sheriff James McDonald Sr. (R, Phillipsburg; 2025) and Surrogate Michael J. Doherty (R, Washington; 2025).

=== Politics ===
As of March 2011, there were a total of 1,583 registered voters in Frelinghuysen Township, of which 248 (15.7% vs. 21.5% countywide) were registered as Democrats, 700 (44.2% vs. 35.3%) were registered as Republicans and 634 (40.1% vs. 43.1%) were registered as Unaffiliated. There was one voter registered to another party. Among the township's 2010 Census population, 71.0% (vs. 62.3% in Warren County) were registered to vote, including 90.6% of those ages 18 and over (vs. 81.5% countywide).

Gubernatorial election results for Frelinghuysen Township
| Year | Republican | | Democratic | | Third party(ies) | |
| Year | No. | % | No. | % | No. | % |
|---|---|---|---|---|---|---|
| 2025 | 722 | 65.28% | 377 | 34.09% | 7 | 0.63% |
| 2021 | 670 | 71.20% | 260 | 27.63% | 11 | 1.17% |
| 2017 | 468 | 68.32% | 185 | 27.01% | 32 | 4.67% |
| 2013 | 535 | 75.67% | 149 | 21.07% | 23 | 3.25% |
| 2009 | 623 | 65.44% | 219 | 23.00% | 110 | 11.55% |
| 2005 | 516 | 64.91% | 248 | 31.19% | 31 | 3.90% |

In the 2012 presidential election, Republican Mitt Romney received 756 votes (65.3% vs. 56.0% countywide), ahead of Democrat Barack Obama with 368 votes (31.8% vs. 40.8%) and other candidates with 22 votes (1.9% vs. 1.7%), among the 1,157 ballots cast by the township's 1,582 registered voters, for a turnout of 73.1% (vs. 66.7% in Warren County). In the 2008 presidential election, Republican John McCain received 802 votes (64.4% vs. 55.2% countywide), ahead of Democrat Barack Obama with 405 votes (32.5% vs. 41.4%) and other candidates with 19 votes (1.5% vs. 1.6%), among the 1,246 ballots cast by the township's 1,577 registered voters, for a turnout of 79.0% (vs. 73.4% in Warren County). In the 2004 presidential election, Republican George W. Bush received 801 votes (66.3% vs. 61.0% countywide), ahead of Democrat John Kerry with 384 votes (31.8% vs. 37.2%) and other candidates with 20 votes (1.7% vs. 1.3%), among the 1,209 ballots cast by the township's 1,491 registered voters, for a turnout of 81.1% (vs. 76.3% in the whole county).

United States presidential election results for Frelinghuysen Township
| Year | Republican | | Democratic | | Third party(ies) | |
| Year | No. | % | No. | % | No. | % |
|---|---|---|---|---|---|---|
| 2024 | 865 | 64.41% | 456 | 33.95% | 22 | 1.64% |
| 2020 | 881 | 63.43% | 482 | 34.70% | 26 | 1.87% |
| 2016 | 827 | 68.57% | 332 | 27.53% | 47 | 3.90% |
| 2012 | 756 | 65.97% | 368 | 32.11% | 22 | 1.92% |
| 2008 | 802 | 65.42% | 405 | 33.03% | 19 | 1.55% |
| 2004 | 801 | 66.47% | 384 | 31.87% | 20 | 1.66% |

In the 2013 gubernatorial election, Republican Chris Christie received 75.7% of the vote (535 cast), ahead of Democrat Barbara Buono with 21.1% (149 votes), and other candidates with 3.3% (23 votes), among the 720 ballots cast by the township's 1,591 registered voters (13 ballots were spoiled), for a turnout of 45.3%. In the 2009 gubernatorial election, Republican Chris Christie received 623 votes (64.5% vs. 61.3% countywide), ahead of Democrat Jon Corzine with 219 votes (22.7% vs. 25.7%), Independent Chris Daggett with 95 votes (9.8% vs. 9.8%) and other candidates with 15 votes (1.6% vs. 1.5%), among the 966 ballots cast by the township's 1,560 registered voters, yielding a 61.9% turnout (vs. 49.6% in the county).

United States Senate election results for Frelinghuysen Township1
| Year | Republican | | Democratic | | Third party(ies) | |
| Year | No. | % | No. | % | No. | % |
|---|---|---|---|---|---|---|
| 2024 | 841 | 64.40% | 429 | 32.85% | 36 | 2.76% |
| 2018 | 631 | 68.66% | 251 | 27.31% | 37 | 4.03% |
| 2012 | 727 | 67.57% | 333 | 30.95% | 16 | 1.49% |
| 2006 | 585 | 64.50% | 293 | 32.30% | 29 | 3.20% |

United States Senate election results for Frelinghuysen Township2
| Year | Republican | | Democratic | | Third party(ies) | |
| Year | No. | % | No. | % | No. | % |
|---|---|---|---|---|---|---|
| 2020 | 871 | 63.95% | 453 | 33.26% | 38 | 2.79% |
| 2014 | 451 | 70.03% | 175 | 27.17% | 18 | 2.80% |
| 2013 | 337 | 72.63% | 122 | 26.29% | 5 | 1.08% |
| 2008 | 785 | 66.30% | 367 | 31.00% | 32 | 2.70% |

== Education ==
The Frelinghuysen Township School District serves children in public school in pre-kindergarten through sixth grade at Frelinghuysen Elementary School. As of the 2022–23 school year, the district, comprised of one school, had an enrollment of 131 students and 13.2 classroom teachers (on an FTE basis), for a student–teacher ratio of 10.0:1. In the 2016–2017 school year, Frelinghuysen had the 28th smallest enrollment of any school district in the state, with 150 students.

Students in seventh through twelfth grades for public school attend the North Warren Regional High School, a public secondary high school that also serves students from the townships of Blairstown (site of the school), Hardwick and Knowlton. As of the 2022–23 school year, the high school had an enrollment of 620 students and 57.6 classroom teachers (on an FTE basis), for a student–teacher ratio of 10.8:1.

Students from the township and from all of Warren County are eligible to attend Ridge and Valley Charter School in the township (for grades K–8, with Frelinghuysen residents among those receiving admissions preference) or Warren County Technical School in Washington borough (for 9–12), with special education services provided by local districts supplemented throughout the county by the Warren County Special Services School District in Oxford Township (for PreK–12).

== Transportation ==
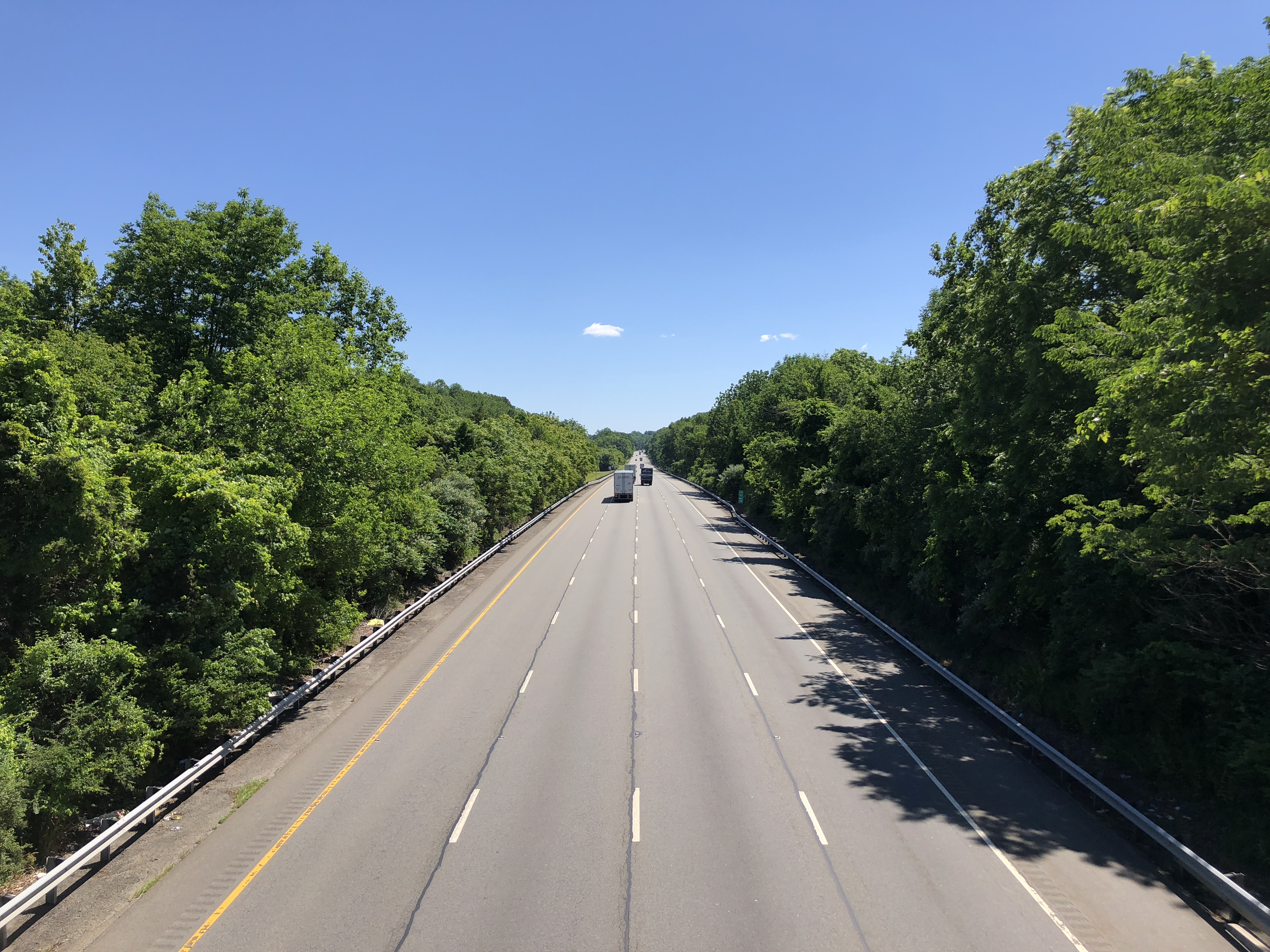
View east along Interstate 80 in Frelinghuysen Township

As of May 2010, the township had a total of 51.83 miles (83.41 km) of roadways, of which 30.05 miles (48.36 km) were maintained by the municipality, 14.88 miles (23.95 km) by Warren County and 6.90 miles (11.10 km) by the New Jersey Department of Transportation.

Interstate 80 (the Bergen-Passaic Expressway) traverses though the southern part of Frelinghuysen, but does not have any interchanges within the township; the closest exits are in both neighboring Allamuchy and Hope Townships. Route 94 runs through in the northern part of the township. CR 519 is the main county road that passes through roughly from the southwest to the northeast.

== Notable people ==
People who were born in, residents of, or otherwise closely associated with Frelinghuysen Township include:

- Bennett Bean (born 1941), ceramic artist
- Cathy Bao Bean (born 1942), writer, educator and author of The Chopsticks-Fork Principle: A Memoir and Manual
- Mark Thomson (1739–1803), politician who served as a United States representative from New Jersey
- Isaac Wildrick (1803–1892), former U.S. Member of Congress
