= Mary Marsh (disambiguation) =

Mary Marsh (born 1946) is a British former charity worker.

Mary Marsh may also refer to:

- Mae Marsh (Mary Wayne Marsh, 1894–1968), American film actress
- Mary A. Marsh (born 1930), United States Air Force general
- Mary Buff (1890–1970), née Marsh, children's illustrator
- Mary Butcher (1927–2018), later Marsh, All-American Girls Professional Baseball League player

== Fictional characters ==
- Mary Marsh, in the 1930 American pre-Code slapstick comedy film Hook, Line and Sinker
- Mary Marsh, in the American serial political drama TV series The West Wing episode "Pilot"

== See also ==
- St Mary in the Marsh, village in Kent, England
