= Isaac Wildrick =

American politician

Member of the U.S. House of Representatives from New Jersey's 3rd district
- In office March 4, 1849 – March 3, 1853
- Preceded by: Joseph E. Edsall
- Succeeded by: Samuel Lilly

Member of the New Jersey General Assembly
- In office 1882-1885

Personal details
- Born: March 3, 1803 Frelinghuysen Township, New Jersey
- Died: March 22, 1892 (aged 89) Blairstown, New Jersey
- Party: Democratic
- Profession: Politician

Isaac Wildrick (March 3, 1803 in Frelinghuysen Township, New Jersey – March 22, 1892 in Blairstown, New Jersey) was an American Democratic Party politician, who represented New Jersey's 3rd congressional district in the United States House of Representatives from 1849 to 1853.

Wildrick was born in Marksboro (in Frelinghuysen Township, New Jersey) on March 3, 1803. He attended the common schools, and engaged in agricultural pursuits near Blairstown. He was constable from 1827 to 1832, coroner from 1829 to 1831, Justice of the Peace from 1834 to 1839, judge in 1839, sheriff from 1839 to 1841 and director of the county poorhouse from 1842 to 1848. He was a member of the Board of Chosen Freeholders from 1845 to 1848.

Wildrick was elected as a Democrat to the Thirty-first and Thirty-second Congresses, serving in office from March 4, 1849, to March 3, 1853, but was not a candidate for renomination in 1852.

After leaving Congress, he resumed agricultural pursuits. He was again a freeholder from 1856 to 1859, and was a member of the New Jersey General Assembly from 1882 to 1885. He died in Blairstown on March 22, 1892, and was interred in the Presbyterian Cemetery in the Marksboro section of Frelinghuysen Township.

U.S. House of Representatives
Preceded by Joseph E. Edsall	Member of the U.S. House of Representatives from New Jersey's 3rd congressional district March 4, 1849-March 3, 1853	Succeeded by Samuel Lilly
