= Robert B. Groat =

American politician

Robert Barrows Groat (February 24, 1888 – February 12, 1959) was an American printer, publisher, and politician from New Jersey. He served in the New Jersey Senate.

== Early life ==
Groat was born on February 24, 1888, in North Brookfield, Massachusetts, the son of William Sylvester Groat and Julia Isabelle Barrows. Groat attended grammar and high school in Salem.

== Career ==
Groat learned the printing trade while working for the Salem Daily Gazette. He then began working in that field in New York City and Chicago. In 1916, he became manager of the Stryker Press and mechanical superintendent of The Washington Star in Washington, New Jersey. He was a member of the International Typographical Union. From 1936 to 1942, he owned and published the Clinton Democrat in Clinton, which his daughter Ethel was editor of.

In 1917, Groat became secretary of the Washington Board of Health and Registrar of Vital Statistics. During World War I, he was connected with the United States Food Administration of Warren County, serving as Food Administrator at one point. He was also chairman of the Finance Committee of the Red Cross in Washington during that time.

In 1924, he was elected to the New Jersey Senate for a two-year term as a Republican to fill a vacancy caused by the resignation of Dr. Thomas Barber. He was the first Republican elected state senator from Warren County since 1879. He served in the Senate in 1925 and 1926. He served as Mayor of Washington from 1938 to 1939. He also served two terms as county treasurer in the 1940s as well as several terms as borough assessor.

== Personal life ==
In 1910, Groat married Jennie Doniger. Their children were Ethel Majorie and Richard Arnold.

Groat was president of the Guarantors of the Chautauqua for Washington from 1922 to 1923. He was a member of the Knights of Pythias, the Improved Order of Red Men, Junior Order of United American Mechanics, the Tall Cedars of Lebanon, the Washington Volunteer Fire Department, the Kiwanis Club of Washington, and the Washington Rotary Club. He was also Grand Master of the Independent Order of Odd Fellows of New Jersey and Treasurer of the Order's Sovereign Grand Lodge, Master of his local Freemason lodge, and Exalted Ruler of his local Elks lodge and district deputy of the Elks Central District of New Jersey. He attended the First Methodist Church.

Groat died from a heart ailment in Warren Hospital in Phillipsburg on February 12, 1959.
