= Cathy Bao Bean =

Chinese-American writer and educator

- Born: Kwei-yee Bao; August 27, 1942 (age 82); Guilin, China
- Occupation: Writer
- Spouse: Bennett Bean

Cathy Bao Bean (Chinese: 包圭漪; pinyin: Bāo Guīyī; Wade–Giles: Pao Kuei-i) is a Chinese-American writer and educator, and is the author of The Chopsticks-Fork Principle: A Memoir and Manual (We Press, 2002). She lives in Frelinghuysen Township, New Jersey, with her husband, artist Bennett Bean.

The Chopsticks-Fork Principle, a humorous but poignant memoir, recounts Bao Bean's experiences as a Chinese immigrant growing up in the United States. Bao Bean uses the story of her own immigrant experience to explain how to reconcile the expectations of families and society at large. She also explains how to raise a child in a respectful context while also choosing the “path less traveled.”

== Early life and education ==
Bean was born Kwei-yee Bao in Guilin, China, on August 27, 1942, to parents Sandys and Dora Bao. Her father, Sandys Bao, represented the Republic of China at the International Sugar Council of the United Nations; and he also served as Vice President of the Taiwan Sugar Corporation. Cathy Bao Bean has two sisters, Bette Bao Lord and Jean Bao (also known as Bao Sansan). Bette is the author of the autobiographical book Eighth Moon: The True Story of a Young Girl's Life in Communist China which recounts part of their childhood.

When Bao Bean's father was sent to New York for a temporary assignment in 1946, he insisted on his family accompanying him. Her mother, however, thought that only the eldest, eight-year-old Bette, would benefit from the trip. When four-year-old Cathy heard of the plans, she packed her doll suitcase and parked in front of the door until her mother relented. The baby of the family, Jean, was left behind in the care of relatives to spare her the ordeal of travel. When Mao's “bamboo curtain” fell in 1949, the four Baos remained in the United States and the youngest finally joined them in 1962.

Bao Bean's first taste of the American educational system was at Public School #8 in Brooklyn, New York. When Bao Bean started school she could speak no English. By 1949, when the Bao family moved to Elmwood Park, New Jersey, Bao Bean started "to think in English and forget in Chinese", as she notes in the memoir book The Chopsticks-Fork Principle: A Memoir and Manual. The family finally settled in Teaneck, New Jersey, where she graduated in 1960 from Teaneck High School. Bean received her B.A. in 1964 from Jackson College of Tufts University and her M.A. in philosophy from Claremont Graduate College, Claremont, California in 1969. Bean was also awarded a Kent Fellowship, from the Danforth Foundation, 1965–67 and 1971–72.

== Career ==
Bean taught philosophy at Montclair State College, Upper Montclair, New Jersey and at East Stroudsburg University, Pennsylvania in the 1980s and early 1990s. From 1968 to 1971, she taught at Jersey City State College. More recently, she has led diversity workshops and spoken on a wide range of issues at colleges and universities throughout the United States.

Following the publication of The Chopsticks-Fork Principle, Bao Bean was featured on The Point with Mindy Todd, NPR Cape Cod; The Smoki Bacon Show, Boston; Under the Radar with Ron Saxon NPR NJ & PA; Many Voices, Many Visions, 13WHAM-TV Rochester. She was also interviewed on CNN, WYPL radio, as well as on NBC, ABC and Fox television affiliates.

Bao Bean is a member of the Board of Advisors of the Claremont Graduate University School of the Arts and Humanities; the Board of the New Jersey Council for the Humanities; and a member of The Star-Ledger Scholarship Committee. She is currently Chair of the Society for Values in Higher Education, where she served as president of the organization from 2009 to 2013. Bao Bean has been founding director of The Summer Workshop for Teachers in China since 2011. She is also a founding member of the Ridge and Valley Conservancy.

Bao Bean is the business manager and accountant for her spouse, artist Bennett Bean. In addition, she teaches aerobics as a service to the Frelinghuysen Township Recreation Committee, New Jersey. Bao Bean and her husband Bennett Bean have a son, William Bao Bean.

== Selected works ==
- The Chopsticks-Fork Principle: A Memoir and Manual, We Press, 2002.
- "Do Parts Equal More Than the Whole?" Journal of College and Character, Volume VI, Number 8, November 2005.
- The Chopsticks-Fork Principle x 2, A Bilingual Reader, Cathy Bao Bean and Dongdong Chen, NJ: Homa & Sekey, 2008.
- "Figuring the Cultural Shapes We Are In," Undoing Whiteness in the Classroom: Critical Educultural Teaching Approaches for Social Justice Activism, Virginia Lea and Erma Jean Sims, editors, NY: Peter Lang Publishing, 2008.
- "Thea, Tea or Me," The Willa Cather Society Newsletter and Review, Spring 2008.
- The Course in Cross-Cultural Communication, Cathy Bao Bean and Dongdong Chen, Sun Yat-Sen University Press, 2014.
