= Johnsonburg, New Jersey =

Populated place in Warren County, New Jersey, US

- Census-designated place
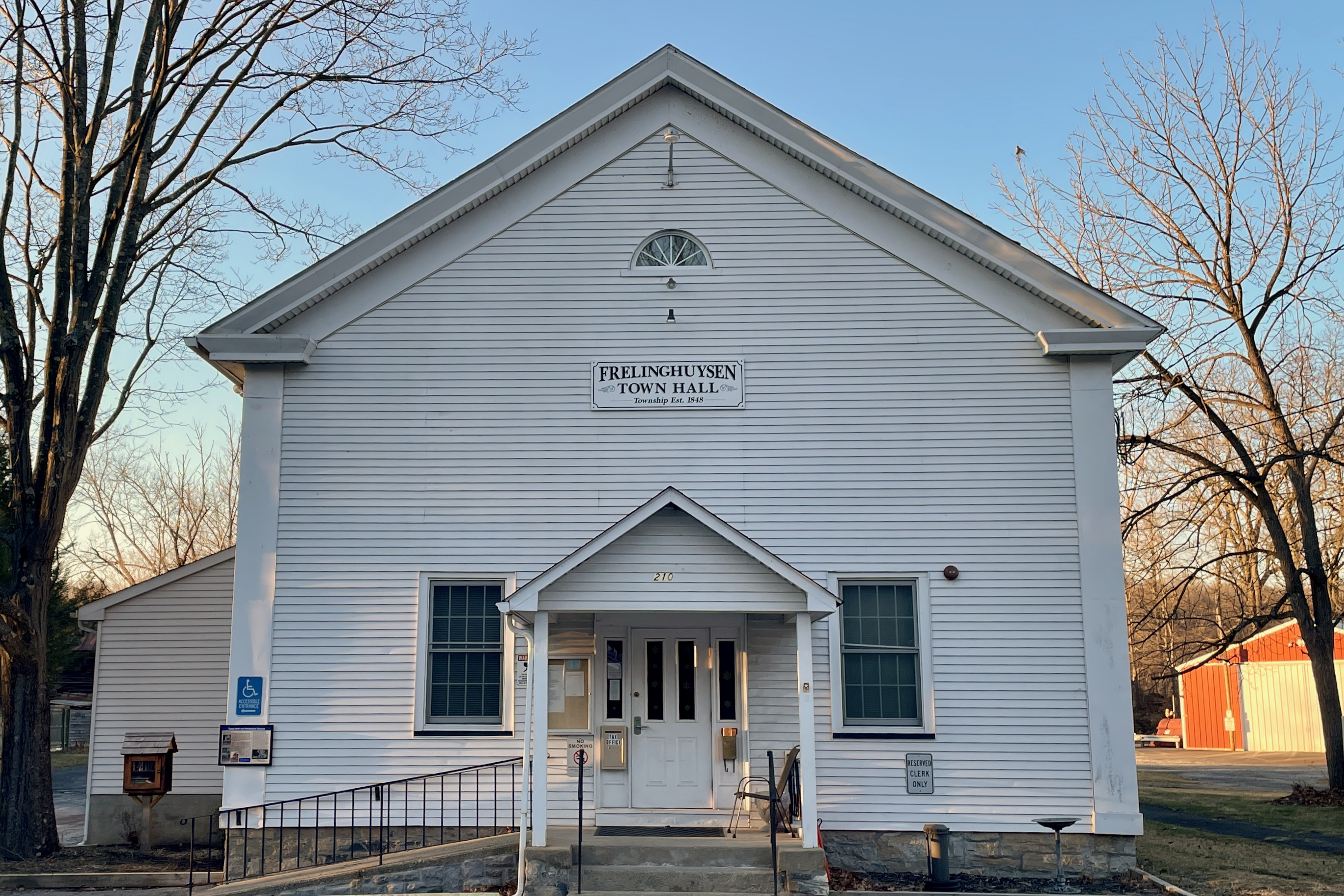
- Frelinghuysen Township Hall

- Location in Warren County Location in New Jersey Location in the United States
- Coordinates: 40.965072°N 74.878177°W
- Country: United States
- State: New Jersey
- County: Warren
- Township: Frelinghuysen

Area
  - Total: 1.07 sq mi (2.76 km^{2})
  - Land: 1.07 sq mi (2.76 km^{2})
  - Water: 0 sq mi (0.00 km^{2}) 0.00%
- Elevation: 574 ft (175 m)

Population (2020)
  - Total: 381
  - Density: 357.7/sq mi (138.12/km^{2})
- Time zone: UTC−05:00 (Eastern (EST))
  - Summer (DST): UTC−04:00 (EDT)
- ZIP Code: 07846 - Johnsonburg
- Area code: 908
- FIPS code: 34-36150
- GNIS feature ID: 02584004

Johnsonburg is an unincorporated community and census-designated place (CDP) located within Frelinghuysen Township in Warren County, in the U.S. state of New Jersey, that was created as part of the 2010 United States census. As of the 2020 Census, the CDP's population was 381, up from 101 in the 2010 Census.

== History ==
Johnsonburg originated as an important stagecoach stop. An east-west route carried mail from Dover, New Jersey to Stroudsburg, Pennsylvania, and a north-south route carried mail from Albany, New York to Philadelphia, Pennsylvania. Both routes crossed at right angles at this location, and a post office and tavern were built. The tavern became an important meeting place, and elections and caucuses were held there.

A jail was erected in 1753, and the community became known as "Log Gaol" (log jail). Located at the time in Sussex County, Log Gaol was the county seat from 1753 to 1765. The county court was also located at Log Gaol.

By 1882, the population had grown to 300. Johnsonburg had a post office, a large glove factory, and a "good local trade".

The Delaware, Lackawanna and Western Railroad ('DLW') opened Johnsonburg station in Johnsonburg in 1911, along a mainline running between Hoboken, New Jersey and Buffalo, New York. The railway was important to local dairy farmers, who shipped their products east to Newark and New York City. The historic Lackawanna passenger station has been demolished.

== Geography ==
According to the United States Census Bureau, the CDP had a total land area of 0.196 square miles (0.509 km^{2}), and no water area.

== Demographics ==
Historical population
Census	Pop.	Note	%±
2010	101		—
2020	381		277.2%
U.S. Decennial Census; 2010 2020

Johnsonburg first appeared as a census designated place in the 2010 U.S. census.

=== 2020 census ===
Johnsonburg CDP, New Jersey – Racial and ethnic composition Note: the US Census treats Hispanic/Latino as an ethnic category. This table excludes Latinos from the racial categories and assigns them to a separate category. Hispanics/Latinos may be of any race.
Race / Ethnicity (NH = Non-Hispanic)	Pop 2010	Pop 2020	% 2010	% 2020
White alone (NH)	101	336	100.00%	88.19%
Black or African American alone (NH)	0	5	0.00%	1.31%
Native American or Alaska Native alone (NH)	0	0	0.00%	0.00%
Asian alone (NH)	0	2	0.00%	0.52%
Native Hawaiian or Pacific Islander alone (NH)	0	0	0.00%	0.00%
Other race alone (NH)	0	3	0.00%	0.79%
Mixed race or Multiracial (NH)	0	15	0.00%	3.94%
Hispanic or Latino (any race)	0	20	0.00%	5.25%
Total	101	381	100.00%	100.00%

=== 2010 census ===
The 2010 United States census counted 101 people, 42 households, and 32 families in the CDP. The population density was 514.3 per square mile (198.6/km^{2}). There were 45 housing units at an average density of 229.2 per square mile (88.5/km^{2}). The racial makeup was 100.00% (101) White, 0.00% (0) Black or African American, 0.00% (0) Native American, 0.00% (0) Asian, 0.00% (0) Pacific Islander, 0.00% (0) from other races, and 0.00% (0) from two or more races. Hispanic or Latino of any race were 0.00% (0) of the population.

Of the 42 households, 23.8% had children under the age of 18; 54.8% were married couples living together; 11.9% had a female householder with no husband present and 23.8% were non-families. Of all households, 16.7% were made up of individuals and 4.8% had someone living alone who was 65 years of age or older. The average household size was 2.40 and the average family size was 2.75.

16.8% of the population were under the age of 18, 5.9% from 18 to 24, 23.8% from 25 to 44, 37.6% from 45 to 64, and 15.8% who were 65 years of age or older. The median age was 46.4 years. For every 100 females, the population had 98.0 males. For every 100 females ages 18 and older there were 95.3 males.

== Historic district ==
- Johnsonburg Historic District
- U.S. National Register of Historic Places
- U.S. Historic district
- New Jersey Register of Historic Places
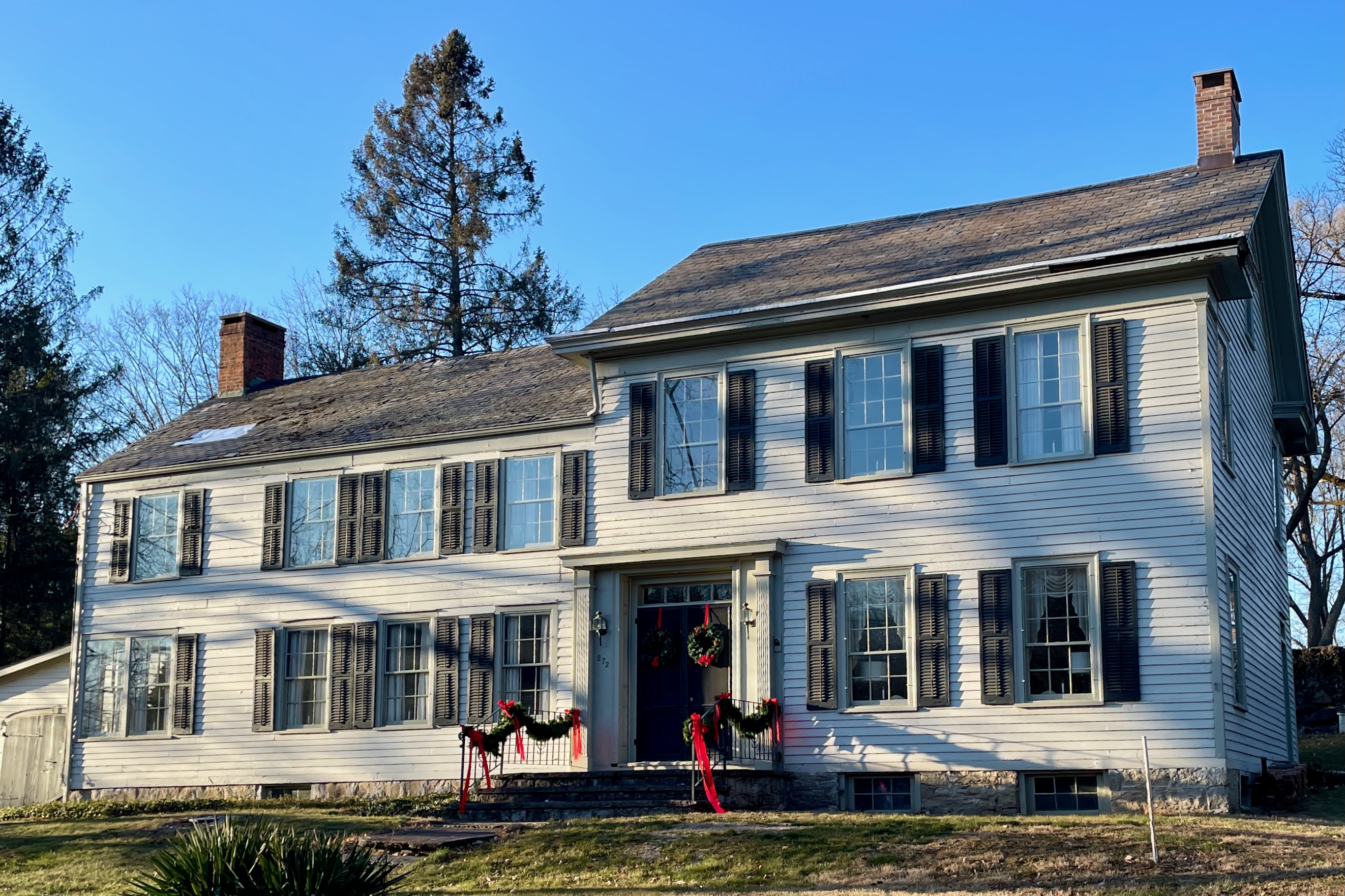
- Armstrong/Blair House
- Location: NJ 519 and 661 and adjacent parts of Mott and Allamuchy Roads
- Area: 163 acres (66 ha)
- Architectural style: Mid-19th Century, Early Republic
- NRHP reference No.: 92001386
- NJRHP No.: 2750

Significant dates
- Added to NRHP: October 15, 1992
- Designated NJRHP: September 2, 1992

The Johnsonburg Historic District is a 163-acre (66 ha) historic district encompassing the community along County Route 519 (Johnsonburg Road, Dark Moon Road), County Route 661 (Main Street) and adjacent parts of Mott and Allamuchy Roads. It was added to the National Register of Historic Places on October 15, 1992, for its significance in architecture, community development, commerce, industry, and religion. The district includes 74 contributing buildings, 4 contributing sites, 3 contributing structures and 1 contributing object.

The Armstrong/Blair House features Colonial Revival and Greek Revival architecture. The Frelinghuysen Township Hall was formerly the Presbyterian Chapel. It was built in 1851 and features Greek Revival and Federal architecture. The Christian Church is a one-story stone church built c. 1838–1848. The Methodist Episcopal Church was built in 1850 with Gothic Revival architecture. The John Gibbs House is an example of an octagon house. It was built in 1853 and was documented by the Historic American Buildings Survey (HABS) in 1941.

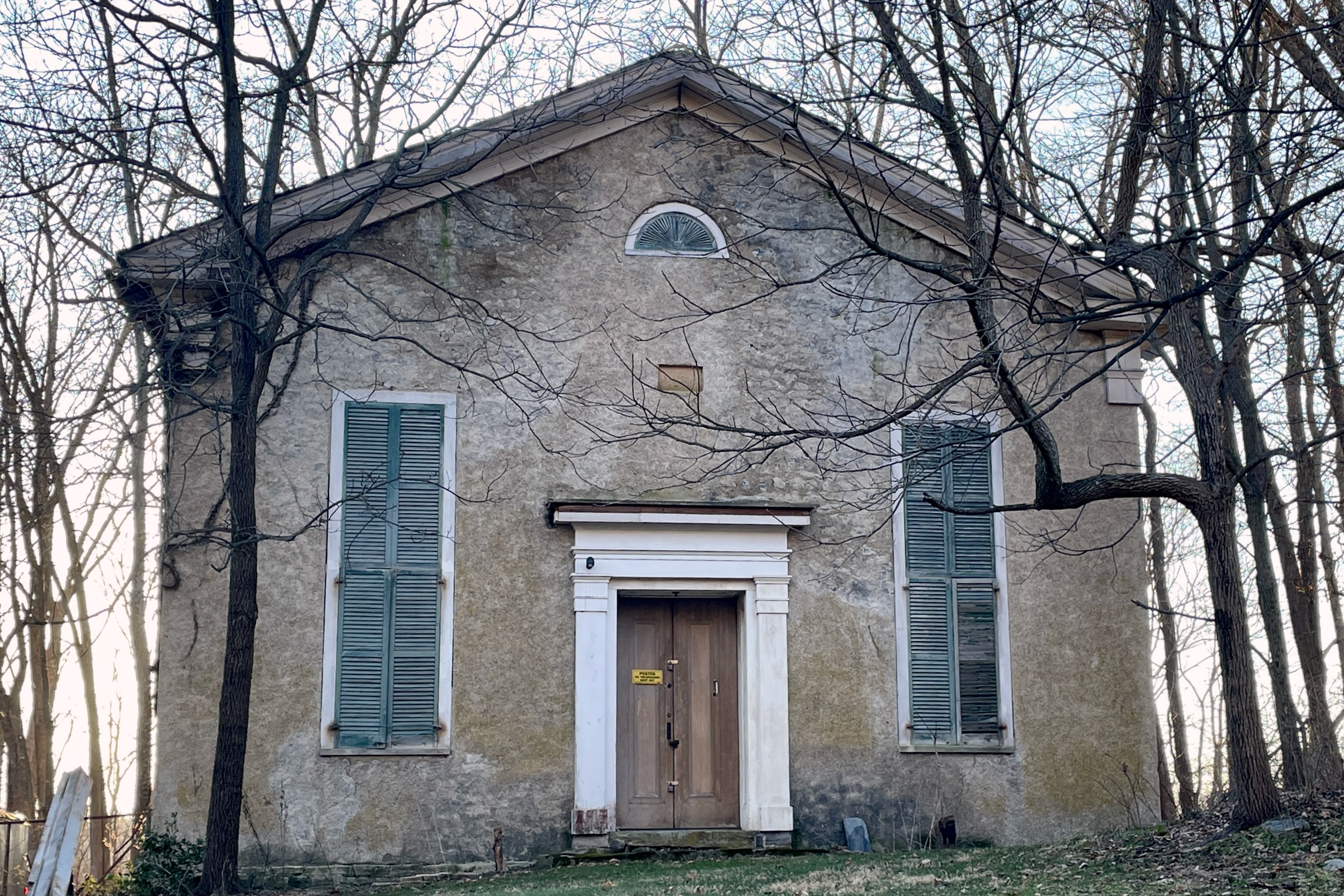
Christian Church

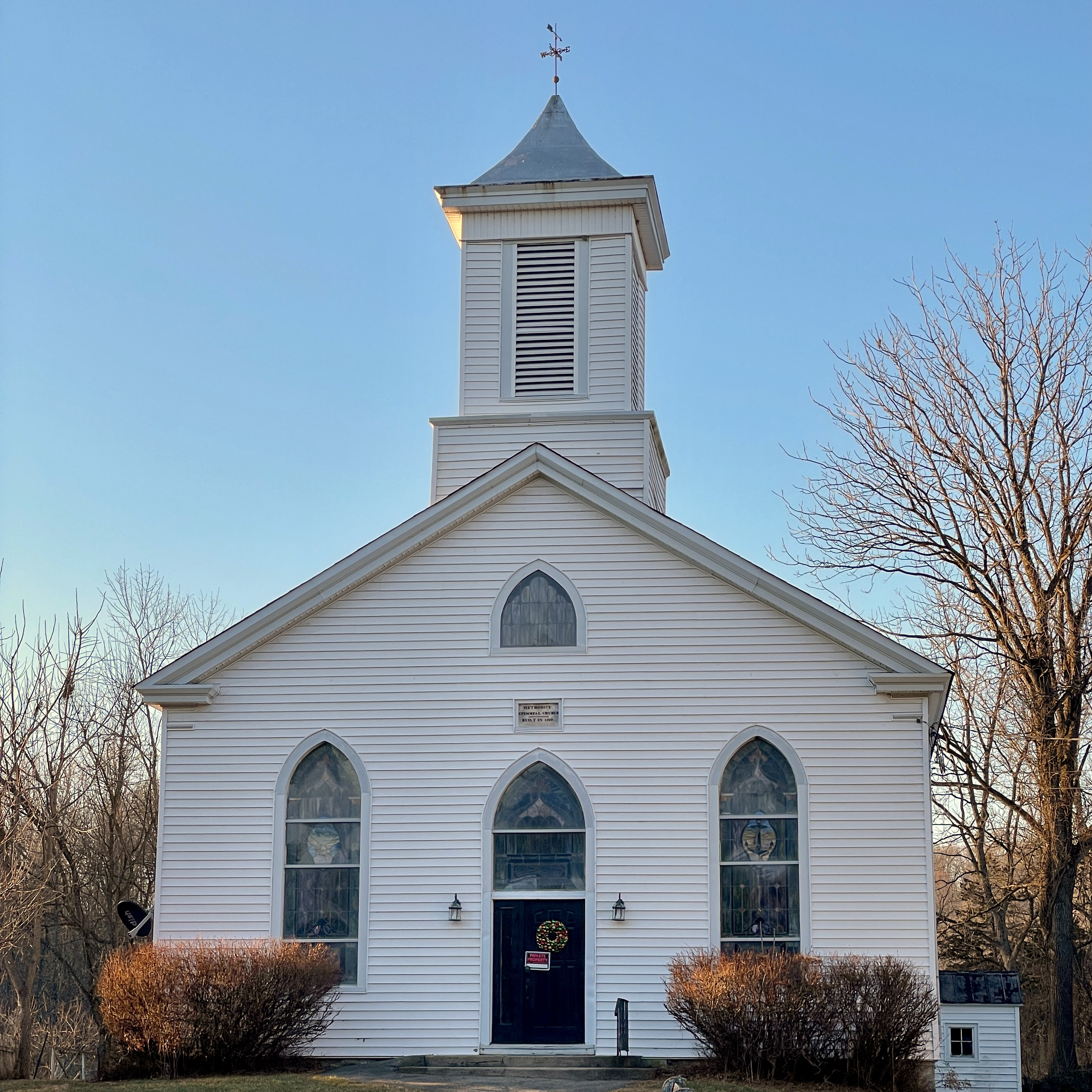
Methodist Episcopal Church

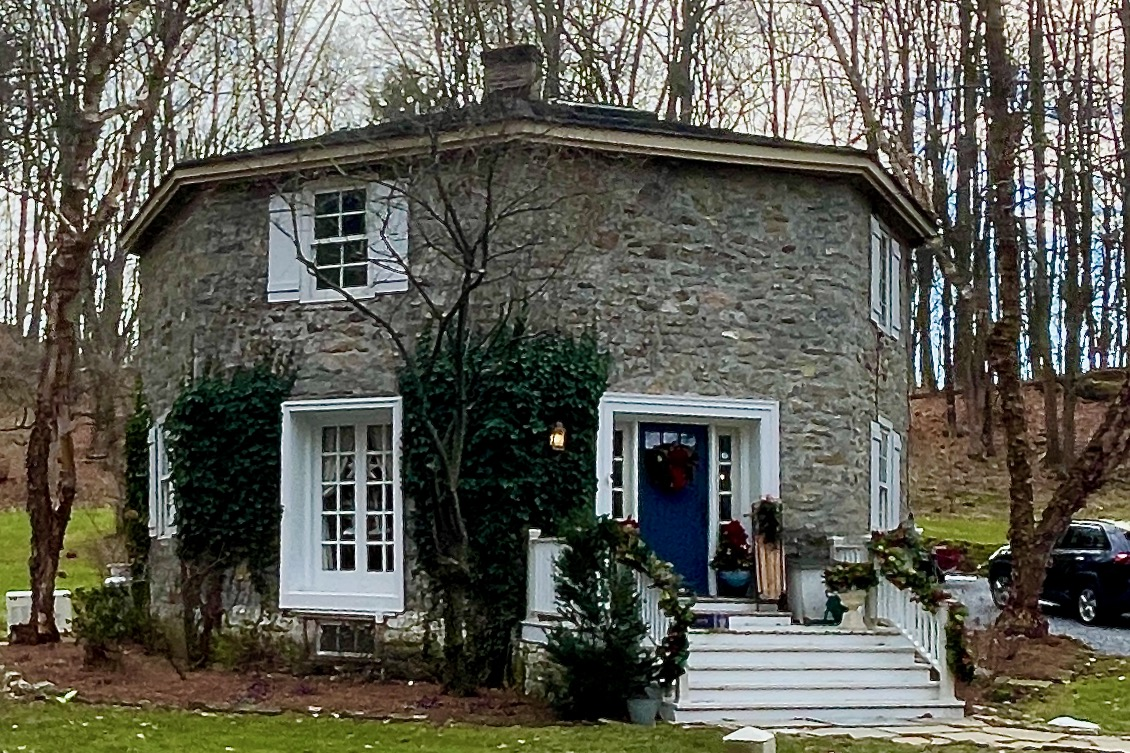
John Gibbs House

== See also ==
- National Register of Historic Places listings in Warren County, New Jersey
