= Joseph E. Edsall =

American politician

Member of the U.S. House of Representatives from New Jersey
- In office March 4, 1845 – March 3, 1849
- Preceded by: Littleton Kirkpatrick
- Succeeded by: Isaac Wildrick
- Constituency: 4th district (1845–47); 3rd district (1847–49)

Judge of the New Jersey Court of Common Pleas
- In office 1830

Member of the New Jersey General Assembly from Sussex County
- In office 1824

Personal details
- Born: March 29, 1789 Hamburg, New Jersey, U.S.
- Died: February 17, 1865 (aged 75) Hamburg, New Jersey, U.S.
- Resting place: Baptist Burying Ground
- Party: Democratic
- Profession: Politician

Joseph E. Edsall (March 29, 1789 – February 17, 1865) was an American Democratic Party politician, who represented New Jersey's 4th congressional district in the United States House of Representatives from 1845 to 1847, and the New Jersey's 3rd congressional district from 1847 to 1849.

== Biography ==
Edsall was born in Rudeville, near Hamburg, New Jersey, in 1789, and attended the common schools. He engaged in mercantile pursuits, and operated a distillery and a tannery. He served as county clerk, was a member of the New Jersey General Assembly, and served as judge of the Court of Common Pleas.

Edsall was elected as a Democrat to the Twenty-ninth and Thirtieth Congresses, serving in office from March 4, 1845, to March 3, 1849. He died in Hamburg in 1865, and was interred there in the Baptist Burying Ground.

U.S. House of Representatives
Preceded by Littleton Kirkpatrick	Member of the U.S. House of Representatives from New Jersey's 4th congressional district March 4, 1845 – March 3, 1847	Succeeded by John Van Dyke
Preceded by John Runk	Member of the U.S. House of Representatives from New Jersey's 3rd congressional district March 4, 1847 – March 3, 1849	Succeeded by Isaac Wildrick
