= Mark Thomson (politician) =

American politician (1739–1803)

Mark Thomson (1739 – December 14, 1803) was a United States representative from New Jersey, serving from 1795 to 1799. Born in Norriton Township (near Norristown, Pennsylvania), he engaged in milling, was justice of the peace of Sussex County, New Jersey in 1773, and was a member of the provincial convention in 1774 and of the Provincial Congress in 1775. He was commissioned lieutenant colonel of the First Regiment, Sussex County Militia on July 22, 1775, and was lieutenant colonel in Col. Charles Stewart's Battalion of Minutemen, February 15, 1776; colonel of the First Regiment, Sussex County Militia, July 10, 1776; and colonel of the Battalion of Detached New Jersey Militia, July 18, 1776.

Thomson was a member of the New Jersey General Assembly in 1779 and served in the New Jersey Legislative Council (now the New Jersey Senate) from 1786 to 1788. He was appointed lieutenant colonel and aide-de-camp on the staff of Gov. Richard Howell on June 10, 1793, and was elected as a Federalist to the Fourth and Fifth Congresses, serving from March 4, 1795, to March 3, 1799. He lived in the Changewater section of Washington Township, Warren County, New Jersey and then was a longtime resident of the Marksboro section of Frelinghuysen Township, which was named for him. He died in Marksboro on December 14, 1803 and was buried in the Hughesville Cemetery, Warren County, New Jersey.

== Sources ==
- United States Congress. "Mark Thomson (id: T000232)". Biographical Directory of the United States Congress.

U.S. House of Representatives
Preceded by John Beatty	Member of the U.S. House of Representatives from New Jersey's at-large congressional district 1795–1799	Succeeded by Henry Southard
