= Bobby Levine =

American jazz musician

Bobby "Lips" Levine (1923 in Washington, New Jersey – September 7, 1997) was an American Jazz saxophonist.

After studying reeds in New York City, he attended Moravian College in Bethlehem, Pennsylvania. Soon, however, he joined the army in 1942, where he served in the US Army Air Corps band during World War II. After leaving the Army in 1946, Levine toured and recorded with Billy Butterfield's first big band. He appears on all of that band's Capitol recordings from 1946 to 1948. He also toured and recorded with Fred Waring's Pennsylvanians (for four seasons) and with Hugo Winterhalter. He married his wife Miriam in 1951.

After this, Levine entered the retail clothing business and was active for 18 years in Washington, New Jersey. During this period, he had his own musical group and began an association with Parke Frankenfield which continued many years. Levine recorded four albums with Parke. In the 70's, Levine toured with the Tommy Dorsey band under Sam Donahue and later Warren Covington, for whom he was the featured soloist. Other credits include Jimmy Dorsey, Sammy Kaye, Vaughn Monroe, Art Mooney, Skitch Henderson, and Chris Griffin. He appeared at inaugural balls for Presidents Nixon, Carter, and Reagan as well as at many jazz cruises, festivals, and concerts.

He started his association with Bob Crosby as a sideman in 1981. Later, he became Crosby's contractor, putting together bands for him which toured Hawaii, Brazil, and throughout the US mainland. Ten years ago, Levine formed a big band in Easton, Pennsylvania known as the Bob Crosby Orchestra, for which he served as musical director.

Levine died on September 7, 1997, from complications due to an infection he received after going in for a routine bypass surgery.

== Sources ==
Riverwalk Jazz
