= Bennett Bean =

American ceramic artist

- Born: March 25, 1941 (age 85); Cincinnati, Ohio, United States
- Education: University of Iowa, Claremont Graduate School
- Spouse: Cathy Bao Bean

Bennett Bean (born March 25, 1941) is an American ceramic artist. Although commonly described as a studio potter, some would characterize him as a sculptor and painter who works primarily in studio pottery. Bean resides in Frelinghuysen Township, New Jersey. Bean is best known for his pit fired white earthenware vessels, especially his collectible, non-functional bowls and teapots. His ceramics works are often asymmetrical, non-functional, and fluid looking.

== Early life and education ==
Bean was born in Cincinnati, Ohio on March 25, 1941. Bean's father, a medical doctor, was serving in the army at the time of his birth, and went on to become the head of the Department of Internal Medicine at the State University of Iowa (an earlier name for the University of Iowa) in 1949. From that point on, Bean grew up in Iowa City, Iowa.

He attended Grinnell College in Grinnell, Iowa, but transferred to the University of Iowa to pursue his art studies. At the University of Iowa, Bean studied both drawing and painting, but he was drawn to the ceramics department, seduced by the technique of throwing and attracted by the university's ceramics faculty. He received his Bachelor of Arts degree in 1963 from the University of Iowa. After a semester of graduate studies at the University of Washington, where Patti Warashina was also a student, Bean moved to California to continue his art studies at the Claremont Graduate School where he studied under artist Paul Soldner. At Claremont he received a Master of Fine Arts degree in 1966.

Bean also met and married fellow Claremont graduate student (of philosophy), Cathy Bao. After graduation, Bean accepted a position teaching ceramics at Wagner College on Staten Island in New York City, where he remained until 1979.

== Work ==
At Wagner College, Bean tried his hand at minimalist sculpture, using acrylic glass and cast acrylic. The Whitney Museum of American Art bought one of his minimalist sculptures in 1967 and included him in its Biennial the following year. Despite this success, Bean refocused his work on ceramic vessels.

An independent studio artist since 1979, Bean has served as an artist-in-residence at Artpark in Lewiston, New York, in 1980, as well as at the Sun Valley Center for the Arts in Indiana in 1981. In 1980, he received a National Endowment for the Arts fellowship. Later, he served on the faculty at the Penland School of Crafts in North Carolina.

Although he has worked in other media and other forms, Bean gained considerable success with his pit-fired earthenware bowls. In the mid-1960s, Bean developed a Japanese-influenced style for throwing bowls and other pottery. Like other potters of that era, Bean primarily threw simple pottery using little surface design other than the spontaneous markings characteristic of the pit-firing technique. Over time, his forms and surface decoration have become more complex, although he has continued to work within the vessel tradition. For example, he has developed numerous post-firing techniques for decorating the pottery. Since 1983, he has typically applied 24 carat gold leaf to the bowls' interiors. Similarly, since 1982 he has used acrylic paints as well as various glazes to apply extensive abstract designs to their exteriors. Since the mid-1990s he has typically arranged his bowls in pairs or trios, often painting across them to create the appearance of continuity among separate, independent objects. He has also worked in other ceramic forms and has ventured outside of ceramics to design various other art objects, including pedestals, rugs, and garden tools.

Bean's influences have included Japanese pottery, Native American pottery, English pottery in the tradition of Bernard Leach, and modern American pottery, including the work of George Ohr.

Bean's work appears in the permanent collections of many museums, including the Boston Museum of Fine Arts in Massachusetts, the Philadelphia Museum of Art in Pennsylvania, the Smithsonian Institution in Washington, D.C., the Newark Museum in Newark, New Jersey, the New Jersey State Museum in Trenton, New Jersey, the JB Speed Art Museum in Louisville, Kentucky and the Whitney Museum of American Art in New York City.

== Additional sources ==
- James Yood, "Bennett Bean," American Craft, vol. 59 no. 6, (December 1999- January 2000).
- Karen S. Chambers, "Not Just Another Pretty Pot," Ceramics: Art and Perception, Issue 29, September 1997.
- Michael Monroe, "The White House Collection of American Crafts" (Abrams: 1995).
