= First Methodist Episcopal Church (Washington, New Jersey) =

Historic church in New Jersey, United States

- U.S. National Register of Historic Places
- New Jersey Register of Historic Places
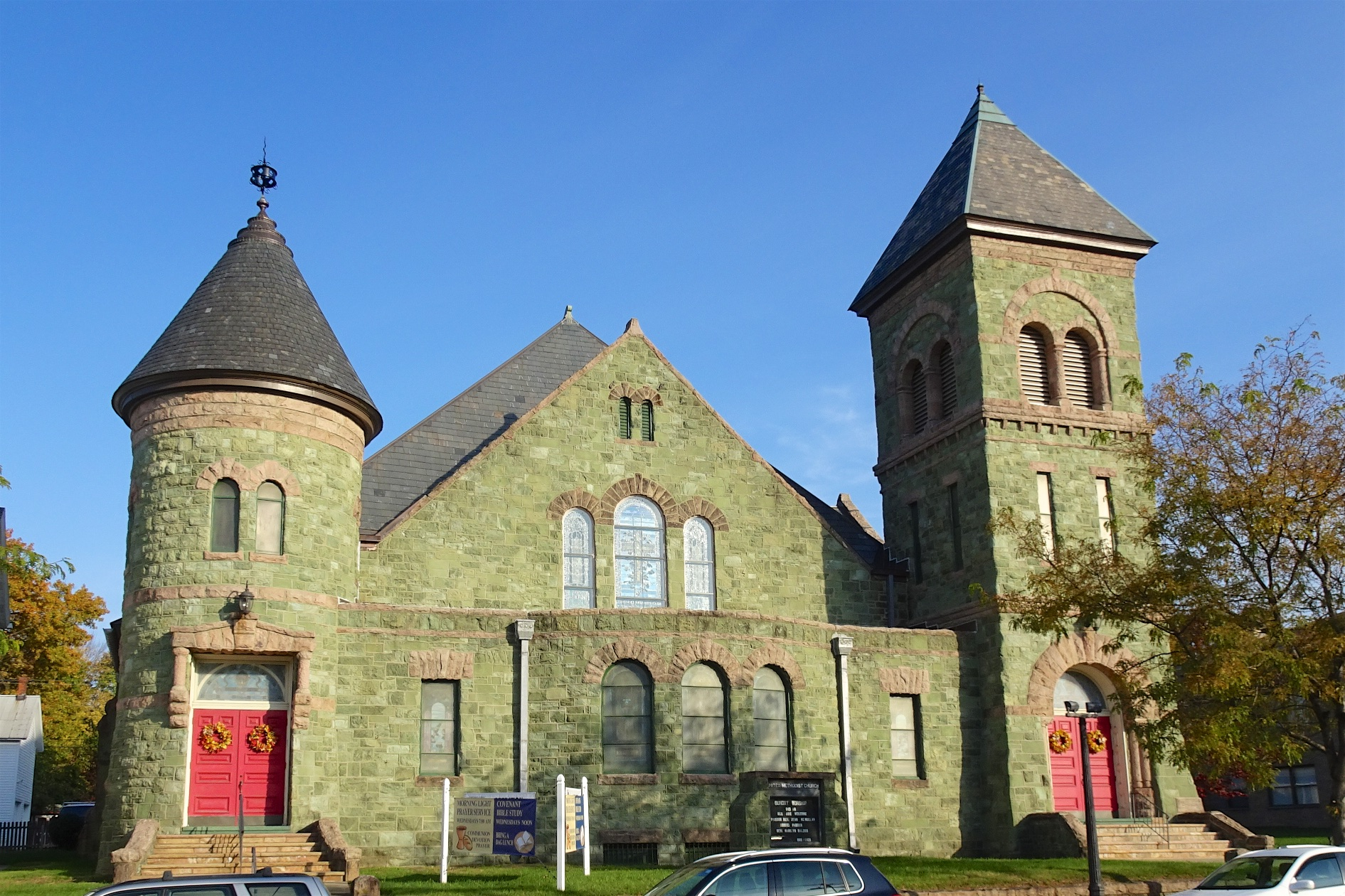
- United Methodist Church in 2016

- Location within Warren County, New Jersey Location within New Jersey Location within the United States
- Location: 116 East Washington Avenue, Washington, New Jersey
- Coordinates: 40°45′33″N 74°58′36″W
- Area: 1.14 acres (0.46 ha)
- Built: 1895
- Built by: Brinton and Smith
- Architect: Samuel A. Brouse
- Architectural style: Richardsonian Romanesque
- NRHP reference No.: 100001322
- NJRHP No.: 5199

Significant dates
- Added to NRHP: July 17, 2017
- Designated NJRHP: May 24, 2017

First Methodist Episcopal Church, also known as United Methodist Church, is a historic church at 116 East Washington Avenue in Washington, Warren County, New Jersey. It was built from 1895 to 1898 with a Richardsonian Romanesque architectural style. The church was added to the National Register of Historic Places for its significance in architecture on July 17, 2017. The parsonage, built in 1892, is also included in the listing.

== History ==
The first building constructed here was a wooden church built in 1825. A fire destroyed it in 1856 and the congregation replaced it with a brick building. In 1895, the brick building was deconstructed to allow construction of the current church.

== Description ==
The church was designed by Samuel A. Brouse in a Richardsonian Romanesque architectural style. It is built using green serpentine stone and has pink sandstone accents. The form is asymmetrical, with a round tower on one side and a taller, square bell tower on the other.

== Gallery ==
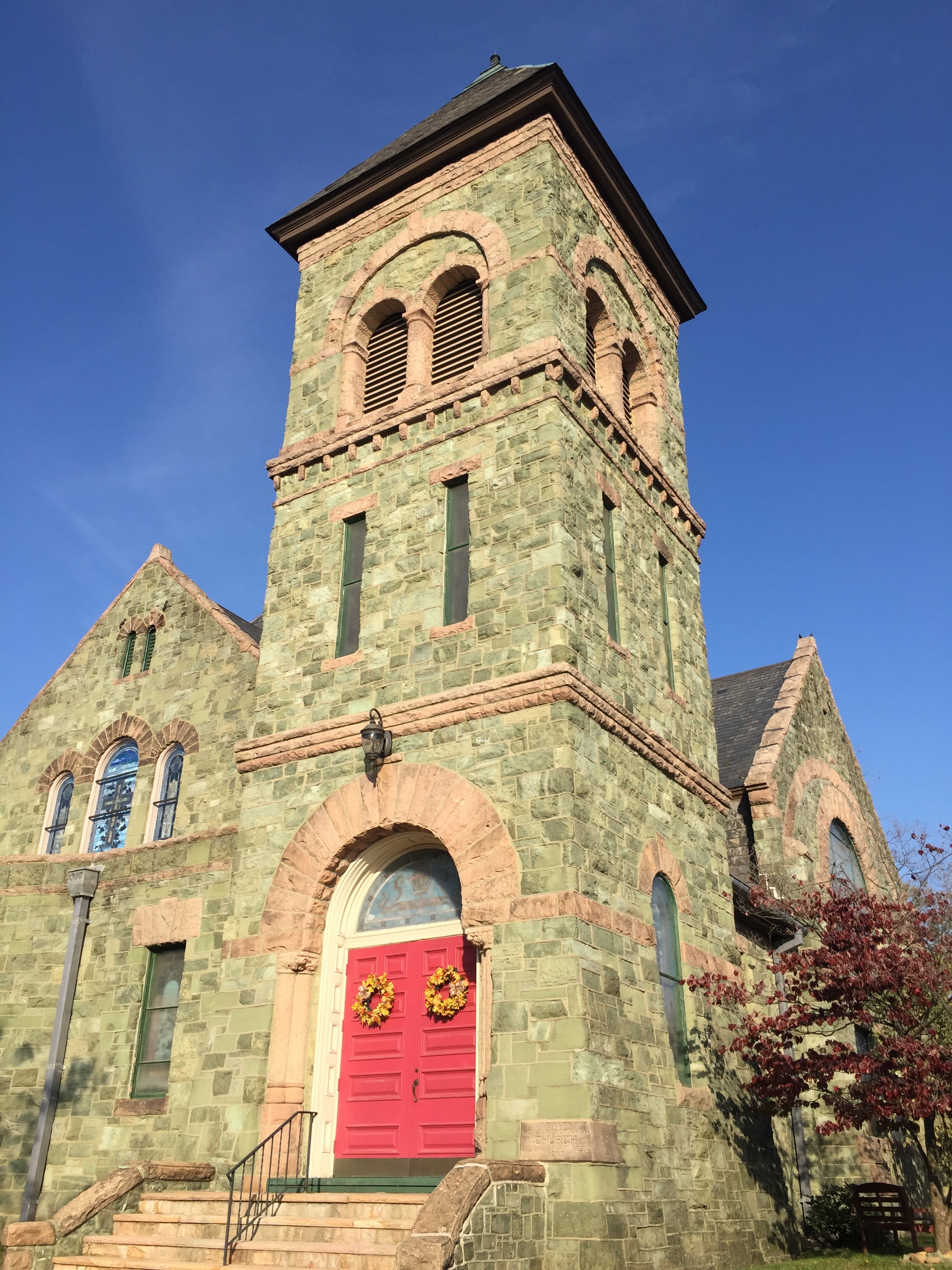
Bell tower

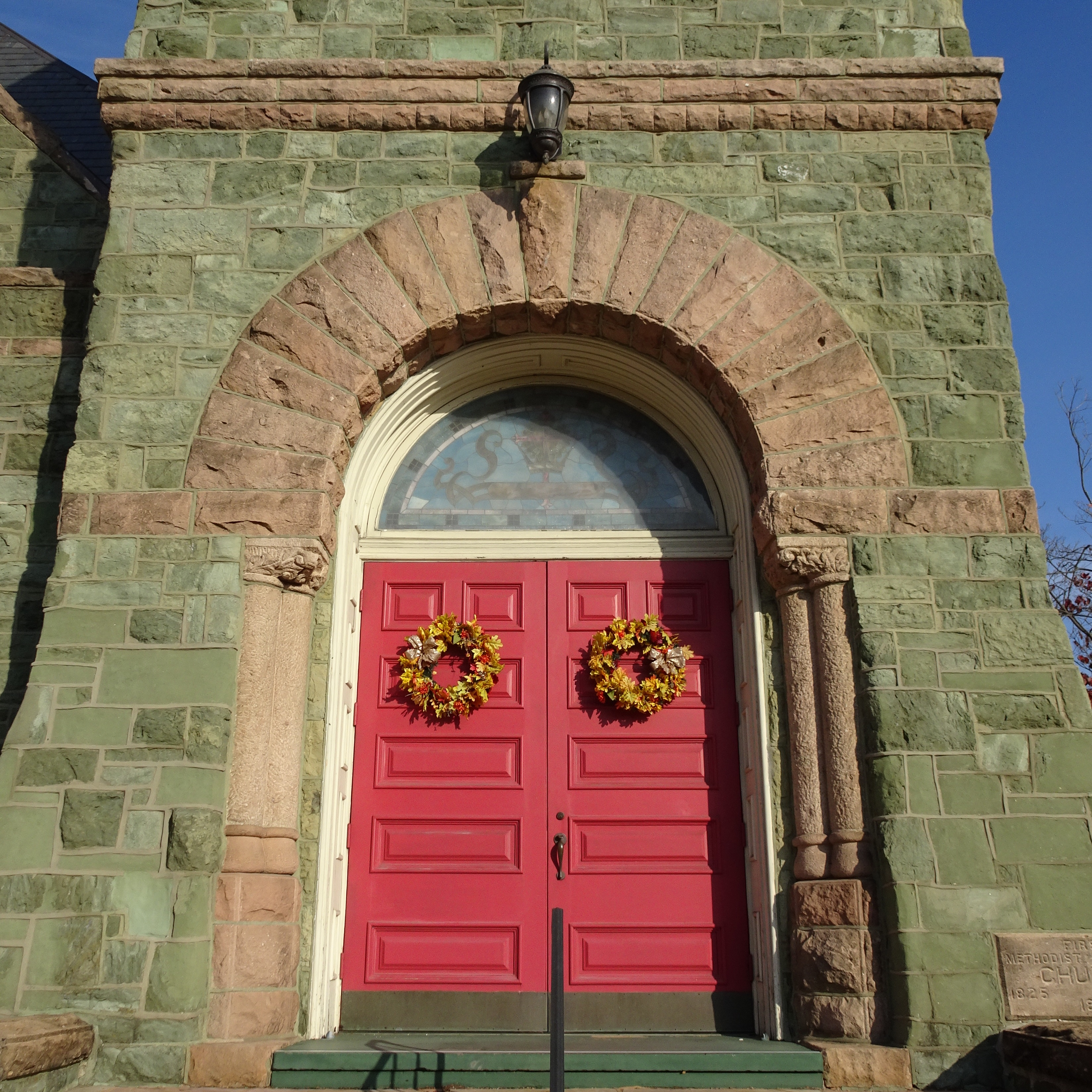
Double door entrance

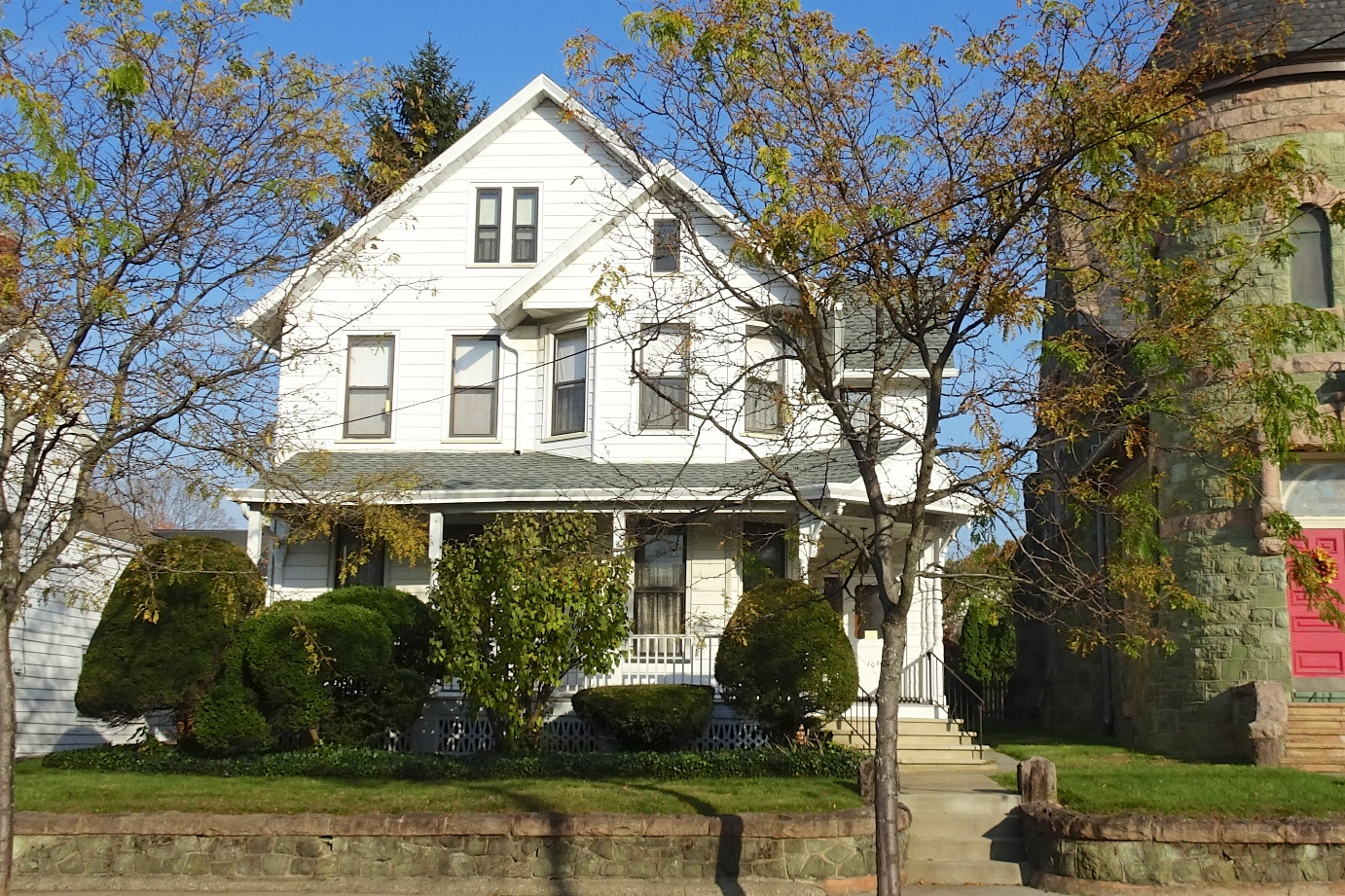
Parsonage, built 1892

== See also ==
- National Register of Historic Places listings in Warren County, New Jersey
- List of Methodist churches in the United States
