= John Henry Brodhead =

John Henry Brodhead (1898–1951) was an African American pioneer in the field of psychology. He was an educator in the Philadelphia school system, known for his work in a number of movements and organizations which promoted Black education. He was the son of Robert and Elizabeth Brodhead and had two siblings, Frank and Annie. During the year of 1924, he married Fleta Marie Jones and together they had one daughter born on August 12, 1928.

== Early life ==
Brodhead was born in Washington, New Jersey, to Robert and Elizabeth Brodhead. His father was a chef on a railroad car during John Henry's youth and his mother was a laundress at a hotel. Brodhead also had one brother, Frank and a younger sister Annie.

== Education and career ==
Brodhead graduated from the West Chester State Normal school in Pennsylvania in 1919. Upon graduating from West Chester, he went to work in the Philadelphia school system, in the West Chester State Normal School, as a teacher and principal. At that time he lived with his friend from college W. J. William, and Mary, his wife, and their young son, William Jr.

Brodhead later attended Temple University, where he received a PhD in educational psychology in 1937. Shortly after receiving his degree, he became the principal of General John F. Reynolds School, one of the largest schools in Philadelphia at the time. Brodhead was a teacher and principal in the Philadelphia school system from 1919 to 1951.

Brodhead was also known for leadership positions in a number of educational organizations. He served as the president of the Association of Pennsylvania Teachers, the New Era Educational Association, and the Pennsylvania Educational Association. In 1949, he was elected president of the American Teachers’ Association.

Brodhead was also a charter member of the Philadelphia Commission on Participation of Negroes in National Defense, as well as the chairman of the Citizens Committee for Integration of Negro Nurses. Brodhead’s work on this committee ultimately led to the admittance of black nursing trainees into the Philadelphia General Hospital.

== Dissertation ==
Brodhead completed his dissertation, “The Educational and Socio-Economic Status of the Negro in the Secondary Schools of Pennsylvania,” at Temple University in 1937.

== Affiliations ==
Brodhead was affiliated with

- American Teachers Association
- New Era Educational Association
- Pennsylvania Educational Association
- Association of Pennsylvania Teachers
- Philadelphia Commission on Participation of Negroes in National Defense
- Citizens Committee for Integration of Negro Nurses

Black History

Brodhead was one of many psychologists to receive recognition during Black History month. Others are noted below.

Stanley Gaines, Ph.D.

Dr. Stanley O. Gaines, Jr., is a Senior Lecturer of Psychology at Brunel University London. He received his B.S. and Ph.D. from the University of Texas at Arlington. In his research, Dr. Gaines has explored the impact of personality characteristics (e.g., attachment orientations, cultural values) and demographic characteristics (e.g., gender, ethnic group membership) on personal relationship processes (e.g., accommodation, interpersonal resource exchange). He is the author of Culture, Ethnicity, and Personal Relationship Processes (Routledge, 1997); Personality and Close Relationship Processes (Cambridge, 2016), which recently received a Distinguished Book Award from the International Association for Relationship Research (2018); and Identity and Interethnic Marriage in the United States (Routledge, 2017). Dr. Gaines has written and co-written more than 100 published articles and book chapters primarily in the fields of close relationships and ethnic studies.

Jennifer Richeson, Ph.D.

Dr. Jennifer Richeson is the Philip R. Allen professor of psychology at Yale University and the director of the Social Perception and Communication Lab (SPCL). She earned her B.S. in psychology from Brown University, and her M.A. and Ph.D. in social psychology from Harvard University. The SPCL aims to examine the processes of mind that influence the ways in which people experience diversity. Areas of focus in her research include reactions to increasing diversity, stigma-based solidarity, emotion regulation following discrimination, and perceptions and reasoning about inequality. She is the recipient of many honors and awards including the John D. & Catherine T. MacArthur Foundation “Genius” Fellowship (2006), election to the National Academy of Sciences (2015), and the Mamie Phipps Clark and Kenneth B. Clark Distinguished Lecture Award (2019).

Cynthia Winston-Proctor, Ph.D.

Dr. Cynthia Winston-Proctor is a Professor of Psychology at Howard University, the Principal Investigator of the Identity & Success Research Lab, and founder of Winston Synergy L.L.C.. She earned her B.S. in psychology from Howard University and her Ph.D. in psychology and education from the University of Michigan. Her academic and practice work focus on narrative personality psychology and the psychology of success of women within academic and corporate environments. Her work has been published broadly in numerous journals and edited books, such as Culture & Psychology, Qualitative Psychology, Journal of Research on Adolescence, and Learning, & Technology: Research and Practice. Dr. Winston-Proctor has been the recipient of honors such as the National Science Foundation Early Career Award for scientists and engineers and the Howard University Emerging Scholar Award. Moreover, Dr. Winston-Proctor’s professional service includes serving as an editor on the Editorial Board of the journal Qualitative Psychology, President of the Society of STEM Women of Color, a Member of the Board of Directors of the Alfred Harcourt Foundation, an Advisor to the Board of Directors of the Howard University Middle School of Mathematics and Science, and she was recently elected to the Society of Personology.

https://spsp.org/news-center/student-newsletters/spspotlight-february-2019/Black-psychologists
