= Mary A. Marsh =

United States Air Force general (1930–2022)

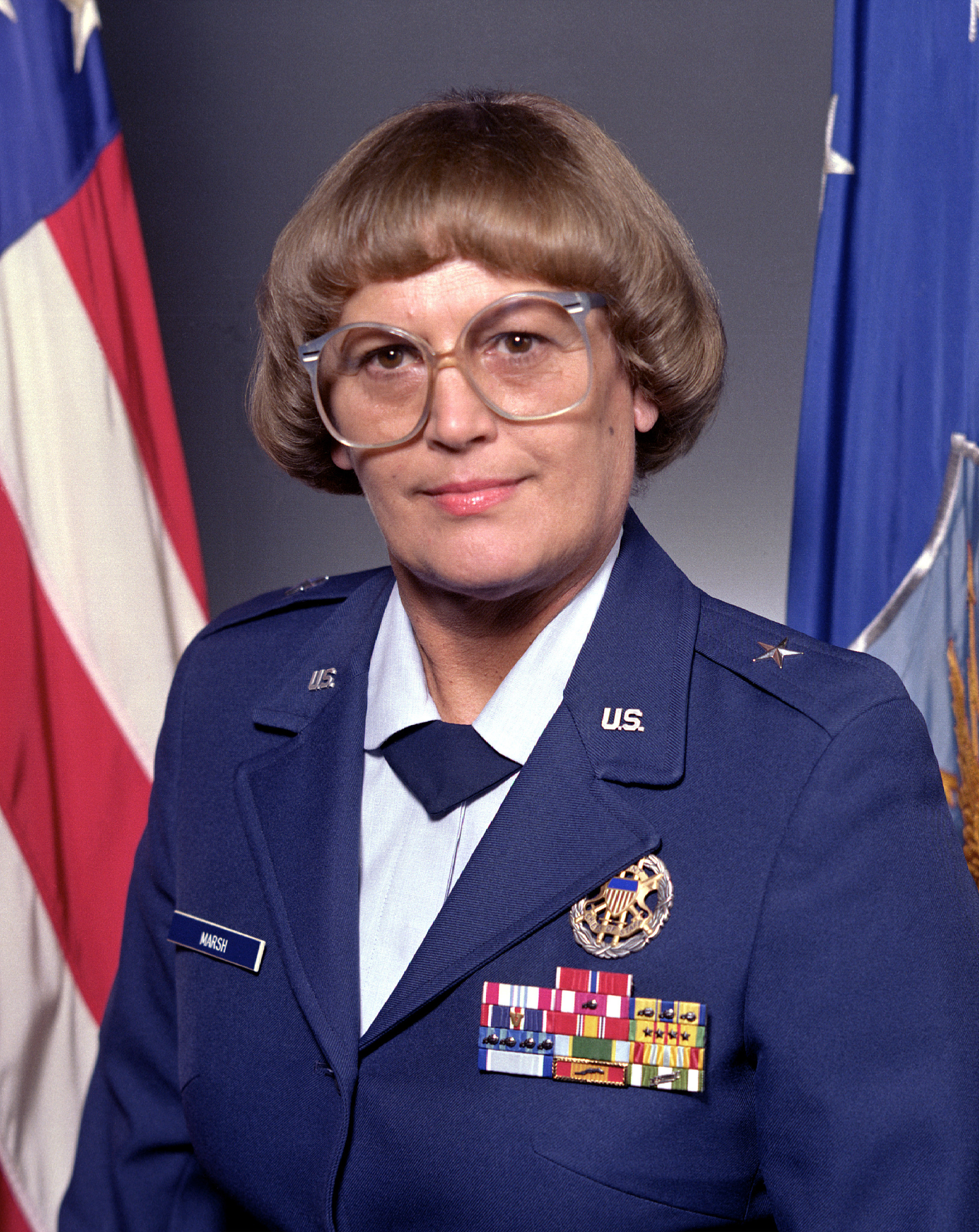
- Born: 11 February 1930; Washington, New Jersey, U.S.
- Died: 10 January 2022 (aged 91)
- Burial place: Fort Sam Houston National Cemetery
- Military career
- Allegiance: United States
- Branch: United States Air Force
- Service years: 1959–1986
- Rank: Brigadier general
- Commands: Director for Manpower and Personnel (J-1), Joint Chiefs of Staff; 50th Combat Support Group
- Conflicts: Vietnam War
- Awards: Bronze Star; Defense Meritorious Service Medal; Meritorious Service Medal (2); Air Force Commendation Medal (4); Armed Forces Honor Medal 1st Class; Air Service Medal; Gallantry Cross with palm

Mary A. Marsh (11 February 1930 – 10 January 2022) was a retired brigadier general in the United States Air Force who served as director for manpower and personnel (J-1) for the Joint Chiefs of Staff.

== Early life ==
She was born in 1930, in Washington, New Jersey. She received a bachelor's degree in music from Murray State University, Kentucky in 1951 and did graduate work at Western Kentucky University.

== Military career ==
She was commissioned a first lieutenant in August 1959 under the direct appointment program of the Officers' Basic Military Course, Lackland Air Force Base, Texas. After graduation she remained there as assistant personnel services officer. In August 1960 she was assigned as the Women's Air Force squadron commander at Sheppard Air Force Base, Texas. She moved to Ramstein Air Base, West Germany, as assistant military personnel officer and chief, Quality Control Branch, 7030th Combat Support Wing, from June 1962 to June 1965.

Upon her return to the United States, she was assigned to Homestead Air Force Base, Florida, as chief of the Data Control Branch and later as chief, Career Control Branch, 19th Combat Support Group. She transferred to Dyess Air Force Base, Texas, in January 1967 as chief of quality control for the 96th Combat Support Group and later served as chief of the Consolidated Base Personnel Office.

Captain Marsh with Air Force Women's Armed Forces Corps members, Tan Son Nhut Air Base, 1968

She was the first Air Force woman assigned as an adviser to the Republic of Vietnam Air Force, Saigon, South Vietnam, in April 1968. Following her return from Vietnam in May 1969, she was assigned to the Defense Intelligence Agency, Washington, D.C., as a personnel officer. She then moved to Headquarters Air Force Systems Command, Andrews Air Force Base, Maryland, in May 1970 as chief, Consolidated Base Personnel Office Management and chief, Records Division.

In May 1971 she returned to Homestead Air Force Base where during a 4½ year period, she served as chief, Consolidated Base Personnel Office, director of personnel and deputy base commander.

Following graduation from the National War College in June 1976, she became vice commander of the 50th Combat Support Group at Hahn Air Base, West Germany and in July 1977 when she took command of the group, was the first woman commander of a combat support group at an operational tactical fighter base.

She moved to Headquarters U.S. European Command, Stuttgart, West Germany, in June 1978 as chief, Intelligence Plans Division. In September 1980 she was assigned to the U.S. Delegation of the Military Committee in Brussels, Belgium, first as special assistant to the U.S. Military Representative and in November 1981 she became chief of staff to the U.S. Delegation. In 1981 she graduated from the Tuck Executive Program, Dartmouth College, Hanover, New Hampshire, under the advanced management program. In August 1982 she was appointed director for manpower and personnel, J-1, Organization of the Joint Chiefs of Staff, Washington, D.C. On May 1, 1983, she was promoted to Brigadier General. She retired from the Air Force on May 1, 1986.

== Personal life and death ==
Marsh was married to the late Major Halbert G. Marsh (USAF, ret), a World War II fighter ace, who died in 2015. General Marsh was a member of the veteran organizations the Disabled Veterans of America, the American Legion, and a lifetime member of the VFW. After retirement, she was a long-time resident of Schertz, Texas.

She was preceded in death by her son, Douglas Eugene Garrett.

She is survived by her grandchildren, Bonney Jean Haynes, Robert Bradley Garrett, and Alison Faith Garrett along with 5 great-grandchildren.

Marsh died on 10 January 2022.

== Decorations ==
Her decorations and awards include the Bronze Star, Defense Meritorious Service Medal, Meritorious Service Medal with oak leaf cluster, Air Force Commendation Medal with three oak leaf clusters, Republic of Vietnam Armed Forces Honor Medal 1st Class, Republic of Vietnam Air Service Medal and Republic of Vietnam Gallantry Cross with palm.
