= Warren County Technical School =

Technical high school in Warren County, New Jersey, US

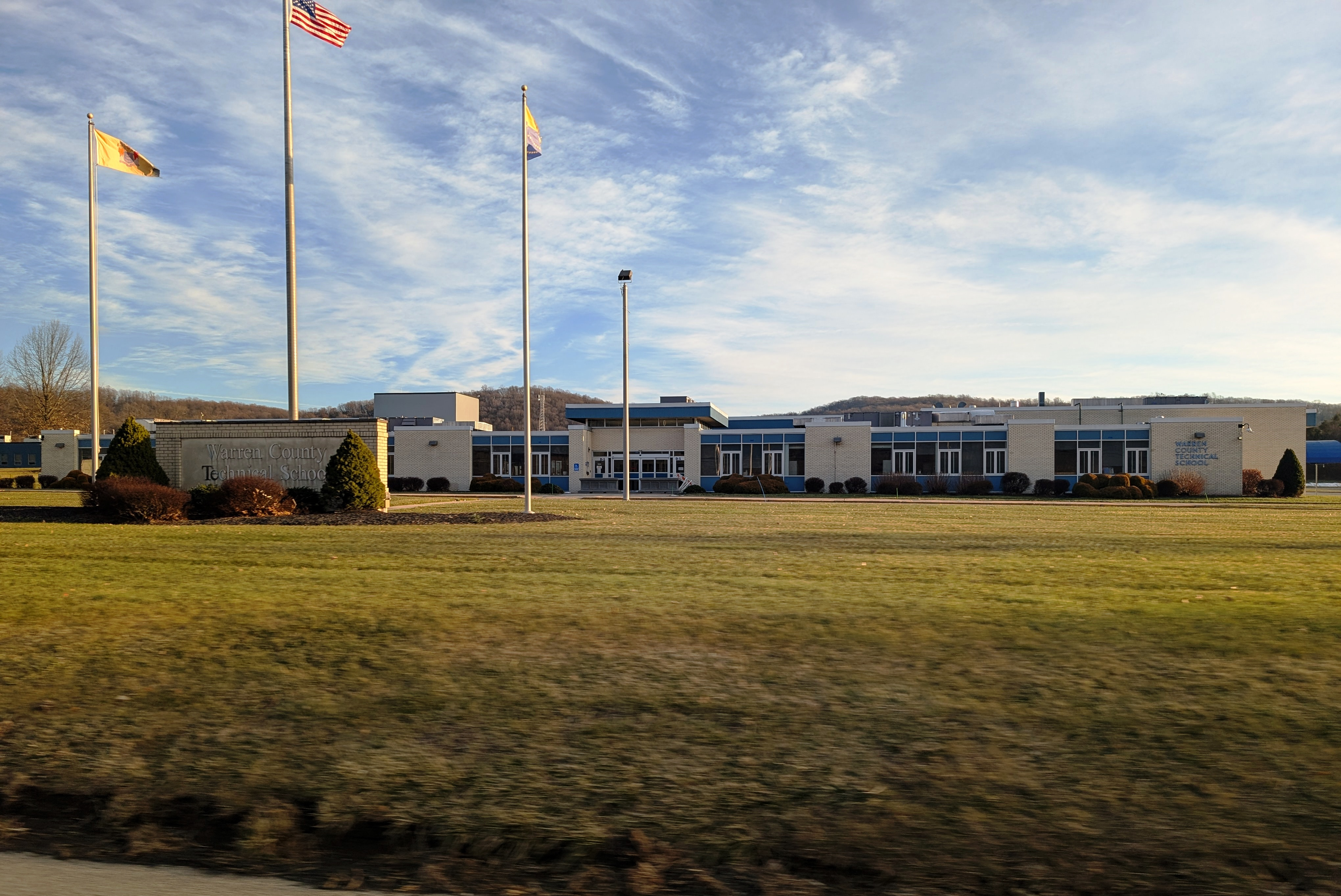

Location
- 1500 Route 57; Washington, New Jersey 07882; United States
- Coordinates: 40.7432°N 75.0249°W

Information
- Type: Vocational public high school
- Established: 1959
- School district: Warren County Technical School District
- Superintendent: Derrick Forsythe
- NCES School ID: 341792005872
- Principal: Jeff Tierney
- Faculty: 41.0 FTEs
- Grades: 9-12
- Enrollment: 406 (as of 2023–24)
- Student to teacher ratio: 9.9:1
- Colors: Navy and Columbia Blue
- Team name: Knights
- Accreditation: Middle States Association of Colleges and Schools
- Website: www.wctech.org

Warren County Technical School (WCTS) is a technical and vocational public high school located in Washington, which serves students in ninth through twelfth grades as well as adult learners from across Warren County, in the U.S. state of New Jersey, as part of the Warren County Technical School District. The school has been accredited by the Middle States Association of Colleges and Schools Commission on Elementary and Secondary Schools since 1996.

As of the 2023–24 school year, the school had an enrollment of 406 students and 41.0 classroom teachers (on an FTE basis), for a student–teacher ratio of 9.9:1. There were 61 students (15.0% of enrollment) eligible for free lunch and 14 (3.4% of students) eligible for reduced-cost lunch.

In addition to students in its full-time high school programs, the school also serves 150 adult students in the fields of Licensed Practical Nursing, Cosmetology, HVAC, Welding, and Black Seal Certification.

== History ==
The current campus, located on New Jersey Route 57, opened in 1959. There were 500 students during the 2013-2014 school year.

== Awards, recognition and rankings ==
Schooldigger.com ranked the school tied for 190th out of 381 public high schools statewide in its 2011 rankings (an increase of 72 positions from the 2010 ranking) which were based on the combined percentage of students classified as proficient or above proficient on the two components of the High School Proficiency Assessment (HSPA), mathematics (75.5%) and language arts literacy (96.1%).

== Facilities and programs ==
Warren County Technical School completed construction of a 150,000-square-foot (14,000 m^{2}) addition that included the creation of a theater for the use of the school's performing arts program. The total cost was $6.7 million.

== High school programs ==
- Electrical Applications
- Law and Public Safety
- Television, Radio, and Digital Media
- Health Sciences
- Automotive Technology
- Cosmetology
- Carpentry and General Construction
- Hospitality and Culinary Arts
- Welding
- Child Development
- Computer Programming (opened during the 2017–2018 school year)

== Athletics ==
The Warren Tech Knights compete in 12 interscholastic athletic programs:

- Fall: Boys and Girls Cross Country, Boys and Girls Soccer,
- Winter: Boys and Girls Basketball, Boys and Girls Bowling, Cheerleading
- Spring: Baseball, Softball
