= Washington Borough, New Jersey =

Borough in Warren County, New Jersey, US

Washington, New Jersey
- Borough
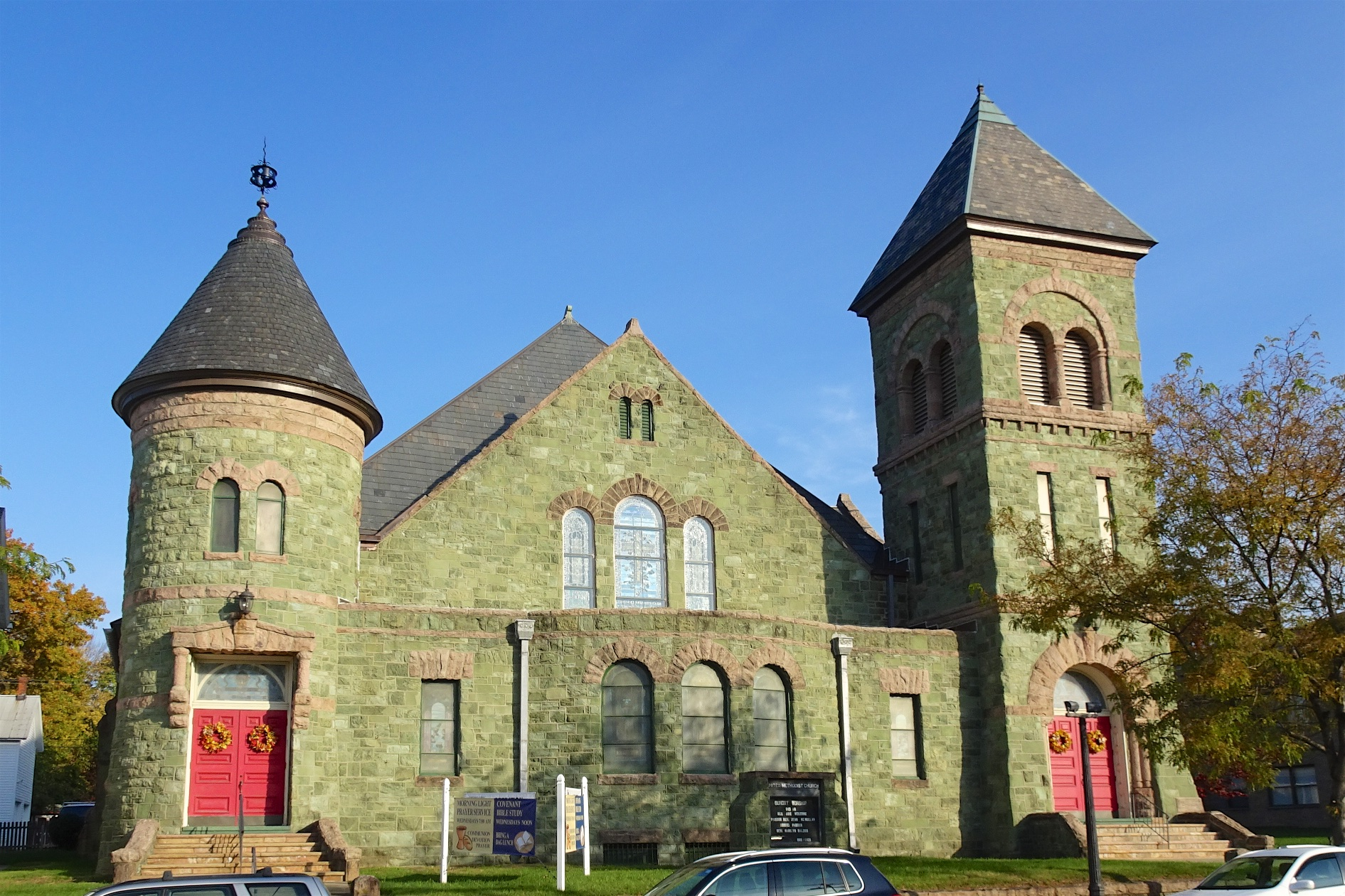
- United Methodist Church on Washington Avenue, listed on the National Register of Historic Places
- Motto: Hometown Friendly
- Location of Washington in Warren County highlighted in red (right). Inset map: Location of Warren County in New Jersey highlighted in orange (left).

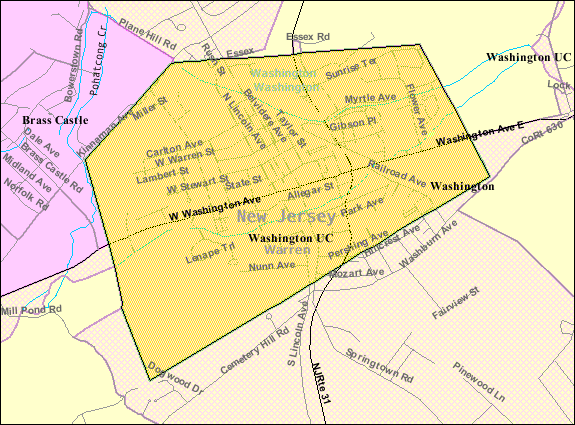
- Census Bureau map of Washington, New Jersey

- Location in Warren County Location in New Jersey Location in the United States
- Coordinates: 40.758525°N 74.98319°W
- Country: United States
- State: New Jersey
- County: Warren
- Incorporated: February 20, 1868
- Named for: George Washington

Government
  - Type: Faulkner Act (council–manager)
  - Body: Borough Council
  - Mayor: Ethel Conry (D, elected to an unexpired term ending December 31, 2024)
  - Manager: Matthew C. Hall
  - Municipal clerk: Laurie Courter

Area
  - Total: 1.97 sq mi (5.10 km^{2})
  - Land: 1.97 sq mi (5.09 km^{2})
  - Water: 0.0039 sq mi (0.01 km^{2}) 0.15%
  - Rank: 414th of 565 in state 20th of 22 in county
- Elevation: 446 ft (136 m)

Population (2020)
  - Total: 7,299
  - Estimate (2023): 7,335
  - Rank: 310th of 565 in state 5th of 22 in county
  - Density: 3,714.5/sq mi (1,434.2/km^{2})
  - Rank: 180th of 565 in state 2nd of 22 in county
- Time zone: UTC−05:00 (Eastern (EST))
  - Summer (DST): UTC−04:00 (Eastern (EDT))
- ZIP Code: 07882
- Area code: 908
- FIPS code: 3404177270
- GNIS feature ID: 0885432
- Website: www.washingtonboro-nj.gov

Washington is a borough in Warren County, in the U.S. state of New Jersey. As of the 2020 United States census, the borough's population was 7,299, an increase of 838 (+13.0%) from the 2010 census count of 6,461, which in turn reflected a decline of 251 (−3.7%) from the 6,712 counted in the 2000 census.

Washington was incorporated as a borough by an act of the New Jersey Legislature on February 20, 1868, from portions of Washington Township. The borough was named for George Washington, one of more than ten communities in the state of New Jersey that were named for the first president. The Borough of Washington is surrounded by Washington Township, which is one of five municipalities in the state of New Jersey with the name "Washington Township".

The borough had the 26th-highest property tax rate in New Jersey, with an equalized rate of 4.206% in 2020, compared to 2.967% in the county as a whole and a statewide average of 2.279%.

== History ==
Washington Borough separated from Washington Township as of February 20, 1868. The community grew during the 19th century as a result of the transportation routes that ran through or near the borough. The Morris Canal ran along the north end of town and two rail lines of the Delaware, Lackawanna and Western Railroad crossed within the borough. Intersecting in the center of the borough are two major roadways, which today are Route 31 and Route 57. The borough was ultimately named for the "Washington House", a tavern built by Revolutionary War Col. William McCullough in 1811 that was later destroyed by fire in 1869.

During the late 19th and early 20th centuries, the borough became a mecca of musical instruments manufacturers, the manufacture of organs in particular. A bustling downtown developed around these businesses. Many of the Victorian style houses in the borough, as well as Taylor Street School and Warren Hills Middle School (formerly Washington High School) were built during this period.

The advent of the automobile brought Washington closer to both the Lehigh Valley and New York City. In the years following World War II, the population increased, and there were many new houses and apartment complexes built. A portion of the Downtown area was devastated by a major fire in 1962. Education at the Middle and High School level was regionalized in 1968, and a new elementary school was also built (Memorial School).

The 1990s saw a population boom in Warren County, which continues today, as high real estate prices and property taxes in New Jersey's northeastern counties push buyers to look further west. Although the borough itself does not have much room to grow, it has benefited from the growth of the nearby townships. Efforts are underway to revitalize the downtown with new residential and retail properties.

== Geography ==
According to the United States Census Bureau, the borough had a total area of 1.97 square miles (5.10 km^{2}), including 1.97 square miles (5.09 km^{2}) of land and <0.01 square miles (0.01 km^{2}) of water (0.15%).

The borough of Washington is completely surrounded by Washington Township, making it part of 21 pairs of "doughnut towns" in the state, where one municipality entirely surrounds another.

Pohatcong Mountain is a ridge, approximately 6 mi (9.7 km) long, in the Appalachian Mountains that extends from west Phillipsburg northeast approximately to Washington. Upper Pohatcong Mountain extends northeast of Washington approximately 6 mi (9.7 km) to the vicinity of Hackettstown. The two ridges are sometimes called "Pohatcong Mountain" collectively.

== Demographics ==
Historical population
Census	Pop.	Note	%±
1870	1,880		—
1880	2,142		13.9%
1890	2,834		32.3%
1900	3,580		26.3%
1910	3,567		−0.4%
1920	3,341		−6.3%
1930	4,410		32.0%
1940	4,643		5.3%
1950	4,802		3.4%
1960	5,723		19.2%
1970	5,943		3.8%
1980	6,429		8.2%
1990	6,474		0.7%
2000	6,712		3.7%
2010	6,461		−3.7%
2020	7,299		13.0%
2023 (est.)	7,335	▲	0.5%
Population sources: 1870–1920 1870; 1880–1890 1890–1910; 1910–1930 1940–2000; 2000 2010 2020

=== 2020 census ===
As of the 2020 census, Washington had a population of 7,299. The median age was 40.9 years. 20.8% of residents were under the age of 18 and 15.0% of residents were 65 years of age or older. For every 100 females there were 92.7 males, and for every 100 females age 18 and over there were 91.0 males age 18 and over.

100.0% of residents lived in urban areas, while 0.0% lived in rural areas.

There were 3,002 households in Washington, of which 29.3% had children under the age of 18 living in them. Of all households, 42.2% were married-couple households, 20.6% were households with a male householder and no spouse or partner present, and 29.7% were households with a female householder and no spouse or partner present. About 30.5% of all households were made up of individuals and 10.8% had someone living alone who was 65 years of age or older.

There were 3,219 housing units, of which 6.7% were vacant. The homeowner vacancy rate was 3.0% and the rental vacancy rate was 6.6%.

Racial composition as of the 2020 census
Race	Number	Percent
White	5,440	74.5%
Black or African American	580	7.9%
American Indian and Alaska Native	33	0.5%
Asian	231	3.2%
Native Hawaiian and Other Pacific Islander	8	0.1%
Some other race	327	4.5%
Two or more races	680	9.3%
Hispanic or Latino (of any race)	1,002	13.7%

=== 2010 census ===
The 2010 United States census counted 6,461 people, 2,623 households, and 1,668 families in the borough. The population density was 3,326.8 per square mile (1,284.5/km^{2}). There were 2,897 housing units at an average density of 1,491.7 per square mile (575.9/km^{2}). The racial makeup was 85.73% (5,539) White, 6.01% (388) Black or African American, 0.09% (6) Native American, 3.42% (221) Asian, 0.08% (5) Pacific Islander, 2.21% (143) from other races, and 2.46% (159) from two or more races. Hispanic or Latino of any race were 8.50% (549) of the population.

Of the 2,623 households, 30.9% had children under the age of 18; 46.3% were married couples living together; 12.0% had a female householder with no husband present and 36.4% were non-families. Of all households, 30.2% were made up of individuals and 8.7% had someone living alone who was 65 years of age or older. The average household size was 2.46 and the average family size was 3.09.

23.9% of the population were under the age of 18, 8.4% from 18 to 24, 28.8% from 25 to 44, 28.3% from 45 to 64, and 10.6% who were 65 years of age or older. The median age was 38.3 years. For every 100 females, the population had 95.9 males. For every 100 females ages 18 and older there were 92.6 males.

The Census Bureau's 2006–2010 American Community Survey showed that (in 2010 inflation-adjusted dollars) median household income was $57,468 (with a margin of error of +/− $7,449) and the median family income was $68,510 (+/− $11,488). Males had a median income of $53,654 (+/− $13,162) versus $41,755 (+/− $12,531) for females. The per capita income for the borough was $30,554 (+/− $5,374). About 8.1% of families and 10.6% of the population were below the poverty line, including 11.4% of those under age 18 and 14.0% of those age 65 or over.

=== 2000 census ===
As of the 2000 United States census there were 6,712 people, 2,724 households, and 1,686 families residing in the borough. The population density was 3,429.9 inhabitants per square mile (1,324.3/km^{2}). There were 2,876 housing units at an average density of 1,469.6 per square mile (567.4/km^{2}). The racial makeup of the borough was 91.45% White, 3.89% African American, 0.12% Native American, 1.45% Asian, 0.01% Pacific Islander, 1.61% from other races, and 1.47% from two or more races. Hispanic or Latino of any race were 4.17% of the population.

There were 2,724 households, out of which 33.9% had children under the age of 18 living with them, 45.5% were married couples living together, 12.2% had a female householder with no husband present, and 38.1% were non-families. 31.6% of all households were made up of individuals, and 10.4% had someone living alone who was 65 years of age or older. The average household size was 2.46 and the average family size was 3.15.

In the borough the population was spread out, with 26.5% under the age of 18, 8.0% from 18 to 24, 33.8% from 25 to 44, 21.0% from 45 to 64, and 10.7% who were 65 years of age or older. The median age was 35 years. For every 100 females, there were 99.1 males. For every 100 females age 18 and over, there were 93.0 males.

The median income for a household in the borough was $47,000, and the median income for a family was $61,379. Males had a median income of $41,436 versus $31,880 for females. The per capita income for the borough was $23,166. About 5.0% of families and 5.6% of the population were below the poverty line, including 7.5% of those under age 18 and 3.3% of those age 65 or over.

== Arts and culture ==
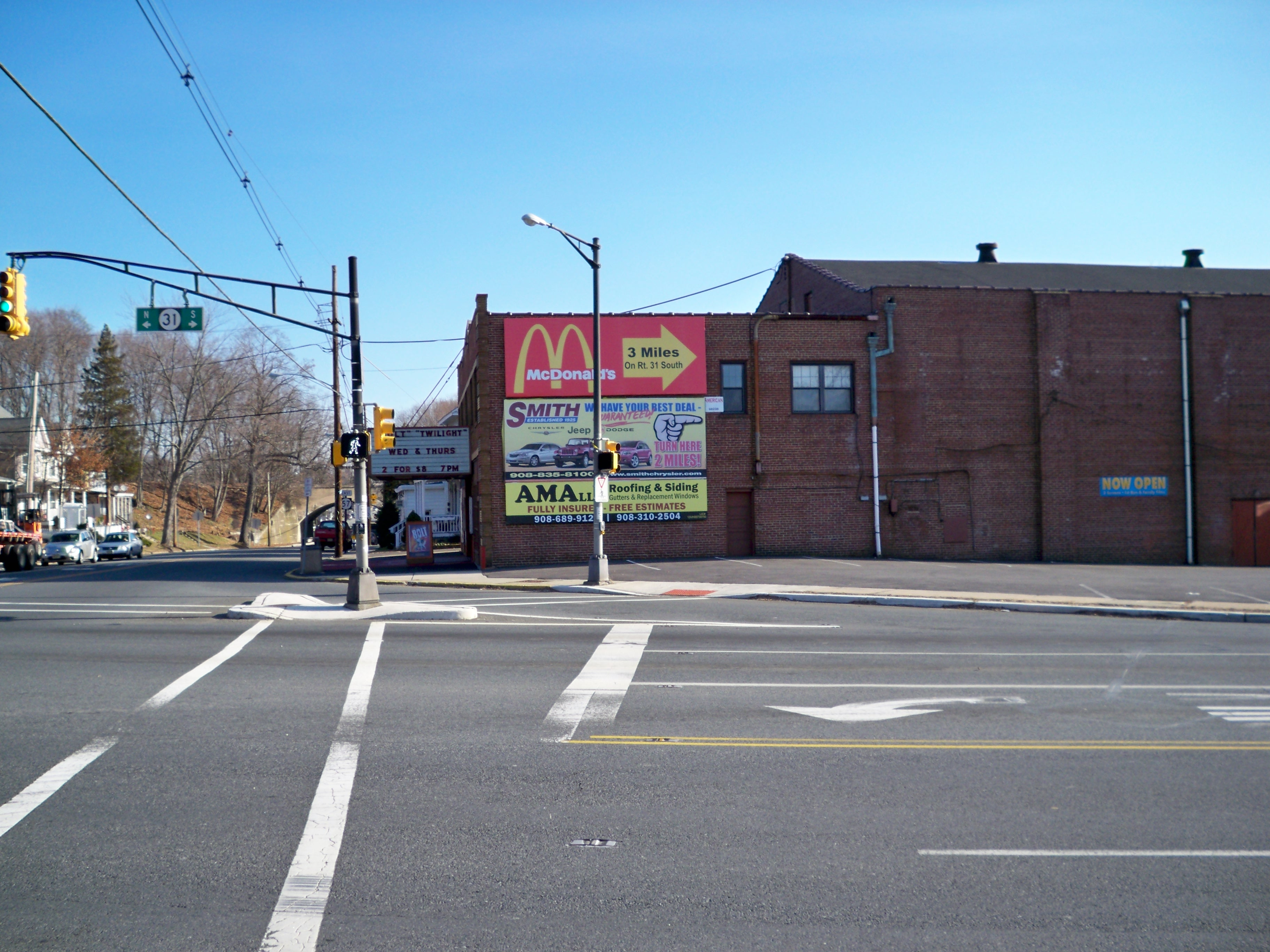
Historic Washington Theatre, open from 1926 to 2015

Notable annual events include Washington Celebrates America, which takes place every July 4; Warren Arts and Craft Beer Festival, held every year in April; and Festival in the Borough, which takes place every September.

== Government ==
=== Local government ===
Washington operates within the Faulkner Act, formally known as the Optional Municipal Charter Law, under the Council-Manager form of municipal government. The borough is one of 71 municipalities (of the 564) statewide that use this form of government. The governing body is comprised of the mayor and the six-member borough council, all of whom are elected at-large on a partisan basis as part of the November general elections. The mayor and members of the borough council are elected to four-year terms on a staggered basis, with either two seats (plus the mayor) or four seats coming up for election in even-numbered years. The council selects a borough manager who is responsible for the day-to-day operations of the municipality.

As of 2023, the borough's Mayor is Democrat Ethel Conry, who was elected to serve an unexpired term of office ending on December 31, 2024. Members of the Borough Council are Deputy mayor Louann M. Cox (Republican, 2024), Jerry Brown (R, 2026), Edward France (R, 2026), Cassandra Gorshkov (R, 2026), Christopher Infinito (R, 2024;appointed to an unexpired term) and Sherri Musick (R, 2026).

In January 2022, the borough council appointed Sonia Ron to fill the seat expiring in December 2022 that had been held by Chelsea Duchemin.

Following the resignation of Mayor David Higgins in December 2021, the borough council voted the following month to leave the position vacant until the November 2022 general election, when voters will choose a candidate to serve the balance of the term of office through December 2024. In the November 2022 general election, Ethel Conry was elected to fill the remainder of the mayoral term.

In January 2017, Paul Jones was selected on an interim basis to fill the seat expiring in December 2018 that became vacant when David Higgins took office as mayor. Dewayne Keith Norris was elected in November 2017 to fill the vacant seat for the remainder of the term of office. A month later, the borough was informed that Norris had faced a number of criminal charges in previous decades including having been sentenced in 1994 to serve 45 days in jail on a misdemeanor larceny charge. The council passed a symbolic no confidence vote by a 4-2 margin, though Norris indicated that he was unwilling to resign from office.

Kristine Henry, who had served as Washington's clerk and borough manager, was sentenced in January 2018 to seven years in jail, lost her ability to work in a public job and was required to repay $97,000 she had stolen from the borough after writing a series of checks payable to herself from 2011 to 2016. Her role was filled by Matthew Hall, who was the borough's manager for several years and helped improve the town's sewers, garbage collection system, and paved the way for new businesses and residences to be built in the area.

=== Federal, state, and county representation ===
Washington Borough is located in the 7th Congressional District and is part of New Jersey's 23rd state legislative district.

For the 119th United States Congress, New Jersey's 7th congressional district is represented by Thomas Kean Jr. (R, Westfield). New Jersey is represented in the United States Senate by Democrats Cory Booker (Newark, term ends 2027) and Andy Kim (Moorestown, term ends 2031).

For the 2026–2027 session, the 23rd legislative district of the New Jersey Legislature is represented in the State Senate by Doug Steinhardt (R, Lopatcong Township) and in the General Assembly by John DiMaio (R, Hackettstown) and Erik Peterson (R, Franklin Township).

Warren County is governed by a three-member Board of County Commissioners, who are chosen at-large on a staggered basis in partisan elections with one seat coming up for election each year as part of the November general election. At an annual reorganization meeting held in the beginning of January, the board selects one of its members to serve as Commissioner Director and other as Deputy Director. As of 2025, Warren County's Commissioners are:

Deputy Director Jason J. Sarnoski (R, Lopatcong Township; 2025), Lori Ciesla (R, Lopatcong Township; 2026), and Director James R. Kern III (R, Pohatcong Township; 2027).

Constitutional officers of Warren County are: Clerk Holly Mackey (R, Alpha; 2027), Sheriff James McDonald Sr. (R, Phillipsburg; 2025) and Surrogate Michael J. Doherty (R, Washington; 2025).

=== Politics ===
As of March 2011, there were a total of 3,790 registered voters in Washington, of which 736 (19.4% vs. 21.5% countywide) were registered as Democrats, 1,136 (30.0% vs. 35.3%) were registered as Republicans and 1,917 (50.6% vs. 43.1%) were registered as Unaffiliated. There was one voter registered to another party. Among the borough's 2010 Census population, 58.7% (vs. 62.3% in Warren County) were registered to vote, including 77.1% of those ages 18 and over (vs. 81.5% countywide).

Gubernatorial election results for Washington
Year	Republican		Democratic		Third party(ies)	
Year	No.	%	No.	%	No.	%
2025	1,194	49.71%	1,188	49.46%	20	0.83%
2021	1,114	58.91%	753	39.82%	24	1.27%
2017	837	55.03%	616	40.50%	68	4.47%
2013	880	67.74%	392	30.18%	27	2.08%
2009	960	58.86%	482	29.55%	189	11.59%
2005	774	53.82%	550	38.25%	114	7.93%

In the 2012 presidential election, Republican Mitt Romney received 1,160 votes (48.5% vs. 56.0% countywide), ahead of Democrat Barack Obama with 1,158 votes (48.4% vs. 40.8%) and other candidates with 41 votes (1.7% vs. 1.7%), among the 2,391 ballots cast by the borough's 3,863 registered voters, for a turnout of 61.9% (vs. 66.7% in Warren County). In the 2008 presidential election, Democrat Barack Obama received 1,256 votes (48.1% vs. 41.4% countywide), ahead of Republican John McCain with 1,249 votes (47.9% vs. 55.2%) and other candidates with 43 votes (1.6% vs. 1.6%), among the 2,609 ballots cast by the borough's 3,730 registered voters, for a turnout of 69.9% (vs. 73.4% in Warren County). In the 2004 presidential election, Republican George W. Bush received 1,477 votes (58.1% vs. 61.0% countywide), ahead of Democrat John Kerry with 1,021 votes (40.2% vs. 37.2%) and other candidates with 29 votes (1.1% vs. 1.3%), among the 2,540 ballots cast by the borough's 3,518 registered voters, for a turnout of 72.2% (vs. 76.3% in the whole county).

United States presidential election results for Washington Borough
Year	Republican		Democratic		Third party(ies)	
Year	No.	%	No.	%	No.	%
2024	1,818	53.91%	1,480	43.89%	74	2.19%
2020	1,763	51.25%	1,601	46.54%	76	2.21%
2016	1,337	54.42%	986	40.13%	134	5.45%
2012	1,160	49.17%	1,158	49.09%	41	1.74%
2008	1,249	49.02%	1,256	49.29%	43	1.69%
2004	1,477	58.45%	1,021	40.40%	29	1.15%

In the 2013 gubernatorial election, Republican Chris Christie received 67.7% of the vote (880 cast), ahead of Democrat Barbara Buono with 30.2% (392 votes), and other candidates with 2.1% (27 votes), among the 1,325 ballots cast by the borough's 4,012 registered voters (26 ballots were spoiled), for a turnout of 33.0%. In the 2009 gubernatorial election, Republican Chris Christie received 960 votes (57.6% vs. 61.3% countywide), ahead of Democrat Jon Corzine with 482 votes (28.9% vs. 25.7%), Independent Chris Daggett with 167 votes (10.0% vs. 9.8%) and other candidates with 22 votes (1.3% vs. 1.5%), among the 1,666 ballots cast by the borough's 3,646 registered voters, yielding a 45.7% turnout (vs. 49.6% in the county).

United States Senate election results for Washington1
Year	Republican		Democratic		Third party(ies)	
Year	No.	%	No.	%	No.	%
2024	1,706	52.22%	1,450	44.38%	111	3.40%
2018	1,102	52.83%	884	42.38%	100	4.79%
2012	1,100	49.57%	1,068	48.13%	51	2.30%
2006	1,225	63.05%	639	32.89%	79	4.07%

United States Senate election results for Washington2
Year	Republican		Democratic		Third party(ies)	
Year	No.	%	No.	%	No.	%
2020	1,692	50.00%	1,577	46.60%	115	3.40%
2014	555	48.64%	545	47.77%	41	3.59%
2013	452	54.52%	369	44.51%	8	0.97%
2008	1,311	54.53%	1,030	42.85%	63	2.62%

== Education ==
Students in pre-kindergarten through sixth grade attend the schools of the Washington Borough Public Schools. As of the 2018–19 school year, the district, comprised of two schools, had an enrollment of 481 students and 44.6 classroom teachers (on an FTE basis), for a student–teacher ratio of 10.8:1. Schools in the district (with 2018–19 enrollment data from the National Center for Education Statistics) are Taylor Street School with 188 students in grades Pre-K–2 and Memorial School with 293 students in grades 3–6.

Students in public school for seventh through twelfth grades attend the Warren Hills Regional School District, which serves students from Washington Borough, along with those from Franklin Township, Mansfield Township and Washington Township, as well as students from Oxford Township (for 9–12 only, attending on a tuition basis). Schools in the district (with 2018–19 enrollment data from the National Center for Education Statistics) are Warren Hills Regional Middle School located in Washington Borough with 542 students in grades 7–8 and Warren Hills Regional High School located in Washington Township with 1,205 students in grades 9–12. Seats on the high school district's nine-member board of education are allocated to the constituent municipalities based on population, with two seats allocated to Washington Borough.

Students from the borough and from all of Warren County are eligible to attend Ridge and Valley Charter School in Frelinghuysen Township (for grades K–8) or Warren County Technical School in Washington borough (for 9–12), with special education services provided by local districts supplemented throughout the county by the Warren County Special Services School District in Oxford Township (for Pre-K–12).

== Transportation ==
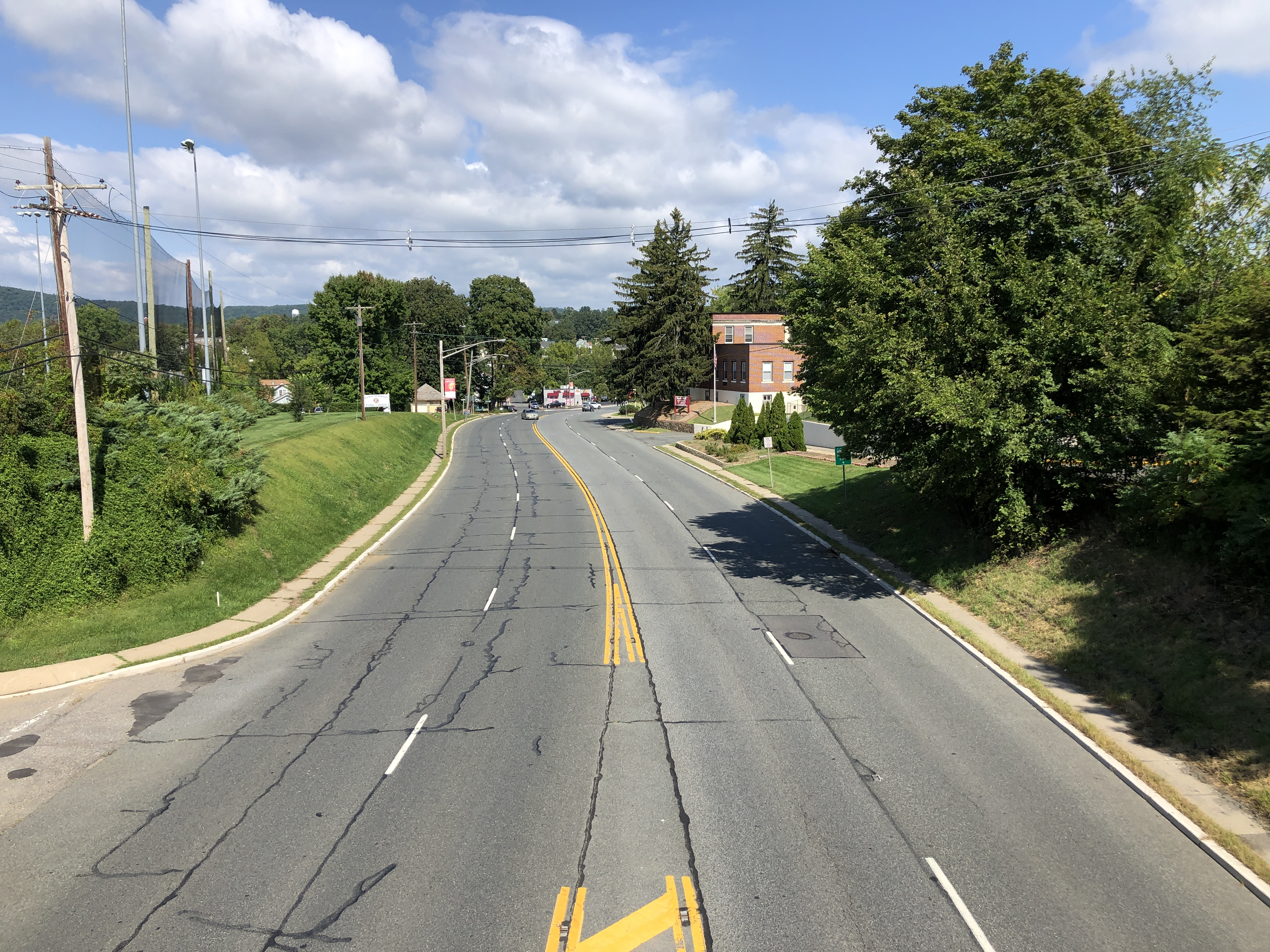
View north along Route 31 in Washington

As of May 2010, the borough had a total of 27.03 miles (43.50 km) of roadways, of which 23.99 miles (38.61 km) were maintained by the municipality, 0.15 miles (0.24 km) by Warren County and 2.89 miles (4.65 km) by the New Jersey Department of Transportation.

The main highways serving Washington are New Jersey Route 31 and New Jersey Route 57. Route 31 travels north–south, while Route 57 is oriented east–west.

== Notable people ==
People who were born in, residents of, or otherwise closely associated with Washington include:

- John Henry Brodhead (1898–1951), educator who served as president of the American Teachers Association
- Johnston Cornish (1858–1920), former U.S. Member of Congress and Mayor of Washington
- Ashley Nicolette Frangipane (born 1994), female music artist known by her stage name, Halsey
- Robert B. Groat (1888–1959), printer, publisher, and politician
- Louisa Boyd Yeomans King (1863–1948), gardener and author
- Bobby Levine (1923–1997), jazz saxophonist
- Mary A. Marsh (born 1930), retired brigadier general in the United States Air Force
- Ron Mrozinski (1930–2005), Major League Baseball pitcher who played parts of two seasons in the majors, 1954 and 1955, for the Philadelphia Phillies
- Christian Sharps (1810–1874), inventor of the Sharps rifle, the first commercially successful breech-loading rifle

== See also ==
- List of places named for George Washington
