= Marksboro, New Jersey =

Census-designated place in Warren County, New Jersey, United States

- Census-designated place
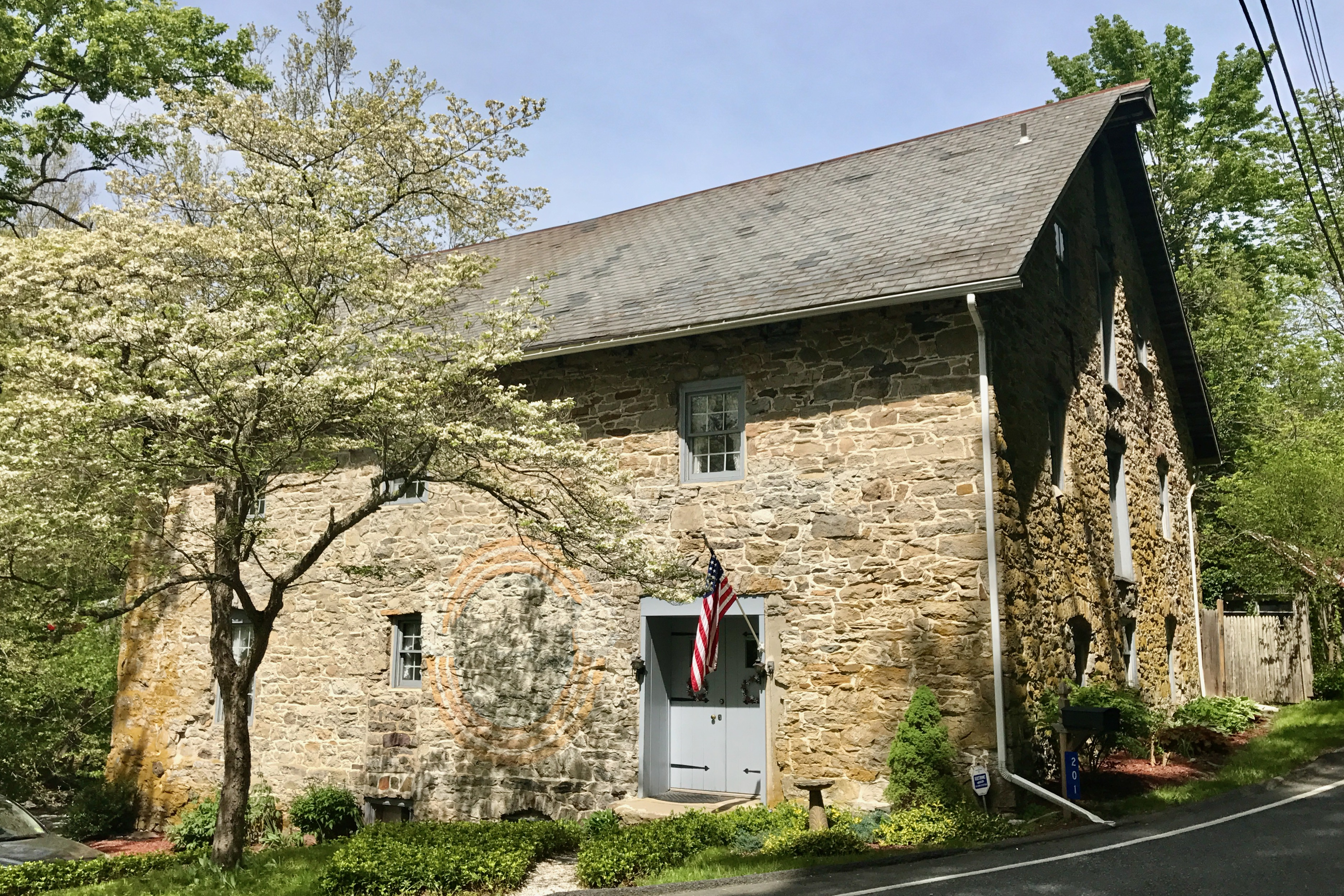
- Marksboro Grist Mill on Spring Valley Road

- Location in Warren County Location in New Jersey Location in the United States
- Coordinates: 40.986418°N 74.904367°W
- Country: United States
- State: New Jersey
- County: Warren
- Township: Frelinghuysen
- Named for: Mark Thompson

Area
  - Total: 2.17 sq mi (5.63 km^{2})
  - Land: 2.15 sq mi (5.57 km^{2})
  - Water: 0.023 sq mi (0.06 km^{2}) 1.08%
- Elevation: 515 ft (157 m)

Population (2020)
  - Total: 186
  - Density: 86.4/sq mi (33.37/km^{2})
- Time zone: UTC−05:00 (Eastern (EST))
  - Summer (DST): UTC−04:00 (EDT)
- Area code: 908
- FIPS code: 34-43980
- GNIS feature ID: 02584009

Marksboro is an unincorporated community and census-designated place (CDP) located within Frelinghuysen Township in Warren County, in the U.S. state of New Jersey, that was created as part of the 2010 United States census, though settlement and naming of the community date back to before 1760. As of the 2020 census, Marksboro had a population of 186.

== History ==
Marksboro is named for Colonel Mark Thompson, who built and owned a grist mill on the Paulins Kill here before 1760. The first store was owned by William Shafer. An academy (school) was built here but was not successful, and was then used as a hotel as early as 1810. In 1814, the Marksboro Presbyterian Church was organized.

By 1882, the population had grown to 175. Marksboro had a post office, grist and lumber mill, and a "good local trade".

== Geography ==
According to the United States Census Bureau, the CDP had a total area of 0.324 square miles (0.837 km^{2}), including 0.320 square miles (0.828 km^{2}) of land and 0.004 square miles (0.009 km^{2}) of water (1.08%).

== Demographics ==
Historical population
| Census | Pop. | Note | %± |
|---|---|---|---|
| 2010 | 82 | | — |
| 2020 | 186 | | 126.8% |
U.S. Decennial Census; 2010 2020

Marksboro first appeared as a census designated place in the 2010 U.S. census.

=== 2020 census ===
Marksboro CDP, New Jersey – Racial and ethnic composition Note: the US Census treats Hispanic/Latino as an ethnic category. This table excludes Latinos from the racial categories and assigns them to a separate category. Hispanics/Latinos may be of any race.
| Race / Ethnicity (NH = Non-Hispanic) | Pop 2010 | Pop 2020 | % 2010 | % 2020 |
|---|---|---|---|---|
| White alone (NH) | 80 | 167 | 97.56% | 89.78% |
| Black or African American alone (NH) | 1 | 3 | 1.22% | 1.61% |
| Native American or Alaska Native alone (NH) | 0 | 0 | 0.00% | 0.00% |
| Asian alone (NH) | 1 | 3 | 1.22% | 1.61% |
| Native Hawaiian or Pacific Islander alone (NH) | 0 | 0 | 0.00% | 0.00% |
| Other race alone (NH) | 0 | 1 | 0.00% | 0.54% |
| Mixed race or Multiracial (NH) | 0 | 3 | 0.00% | 1.61% |
| Hispanic or Latino (any race) | 0 | 9 | 0.00% | 4.84% |
| Total | 82 | 186 | 100.00% | 100.00% |

As of the 2020 United States census, the population was 186.

=== 2010 census ===
The 2010 United States census counted 82 people, 30 households, and 25 families in the CDP. The population density was 256.6 per square mile (99.1/km^{2}). There were 36 housing units at an average density of 112.7 per square mile (43.5/km^{2}). The racial makeup was 97.56% (80) White, 1.22% (1) Black or African American, 0.00% (0) Native American, 1.22% (1) Asian, 0.00% (0) Pacific Islander, 0.00% (0) from other races, and 0.00% (0) from two or more races. Hispanic or Latino of any race were 0.00% (0) of the population.

Of the 30 households, 26.7% had children under the age of 18; 60.0% were married couples living together; 13.3% had a female householder with no husband present and 16.7% were non-families. Of all households, 10.0% were made up of individuals and 6.7% had someone living alone who was 65 years of age or older. The average household size was 2.73 and the average family size was 2.96.

22.0% of the population were under the age of 18, 6.1% from 18 to 24, 17.1% from 25 to 44, 41.5% from 45 to 64, and 13.4% who were 65 years of age or older. The median age was 47.7 years. For every 100 females, the population had 110.3 males. For every 100 females ages 18 and older there were 93.9 males.

== Notable people ==
People who were born in, residents of, or otherwise closely associated with Marksboro include:

- Mark Thomson (1739–1803), politician who served as a United States representative from New Jersey
