= National Register of Historic Places listings in Warren County, New Jersey =

Location of Warren County in New Jersey

List of the National Register of Historic Places listings in Warren County, New Jersey

Contents: Counties and communities in New Jersey
Atlantic – Bergen (Closter, Franklin Lakes, Ridgewood, Saddle River, Wyckoff) – Burlington – Camden – Cape May – Cumberland – Essex – Gloucester – Hudson – Hunterdon – Mercer – Middlesex – Monmouth – Morris – Ocean – Passaic – Salem – Somerset – Sussex – Union – Warren

This is intended to be a complete list of properties and districts listed on the National Register of Historic Places in Warren County, New Jersey. Latitude and longitude coordinates of the sites listed on this page may be displayed in an online map.

This National Park Service list is complete through NPS recent listings posted May 16, 2025.

	Name on the Register	Image	Date listed	Location	City or town	Description
1	Allamuchy Freight House	Allamuchy Freight House	September 23, 2002 (#02001056)	Rte. 612, 800 feet south of intersection with Long Bridge Road. 40°55′55″N 74°49′13″W	Allamuchy	
2	Jacob C. Allen House	Jacob C. Allen House	August 24, 2005 (#05000911)	206 W. Moore Street; 40°51′07″N 74°49′50″W	Hackettstown	
3	Asbury Historic District	Asbury Historic District	March 19, 1993 (#93000132)	County Routes 632 and 643, Maple Avenue, Kitchen Road, and School Street; 40°41′53″N 75°00′50″W	Asbury	Extends into Bethlehem Township, Hunterdon County
4	Beattystown Historic District	Beattystown Historic District	September 28, 1990 (#90001449)	Junction of NJ 57 and Kings Highway; 40°48′49″N 74°50′34″W	Beattystown	
5	Belvidere Historic District	Belvidere Historic District	October 3, 1980 (#80002525)	Market and Race streets; Greenwich and Mansfield avenues; and the Pequest River; 40°49′45″N 75°04′37″W	Belvidere	Includes Warren County Courthouse
6	Blair Academy	Blair Academy	January 24, 1992 (#89001944)	NJ Route 94; 40°59′06″N 74°57′50″W	Blairstown	Historically known as Blair Presbyterial Academy
7	Blairstown Historic District	Blairstown Historic District	February 16, 2007 (#07000046)	Main Street, East Avenue, Douglas Street, Water Street, Blair Place; 40°58′59″N 74°57′35″W	Blairstown	
8	Bowerstown Historic District	Bowerstown Historic District	May 10, 1996 (#96000537)	Roughly bounded by Bowerstown, Plane Hill, Lannings Trail and Mine Hill roads 40°46′22″N 74°59′54″W	Washington Township	
9	Centenary Collegiate Institute	Centenary Collegiate Institute	June 13, 1997 (#97000564)	400 Jefferson Street; 40°50′57″N 74°49′57″W	Hackettstown	
10	Delaware Historic District	Delaware Historic District	March 20, 2003 (#03000128)	Ann, Clinton, Charles, and Valley Streets, Delaware Road, NJ 46 and Ferry Lane; 40°53′44″N 75°03′51″W	Delaware	
11	Fairview Schoolhouse	Fairview Schoolhouse	August 12, 1977 (#77000916)	Fairview Cemetery on Dean Road; 40°55′17″N 75°00′52″W	Knowlton Township	
12	Finesville–Seigletown Historic District	Finesville–Seigletown Historic District	November 10, 2010 (#10000892)	County Route 627; Mountain, Musconetcong, Mount Joy and Bellis roads 40°36′32″N 75°10′04″W	Finesville	Includes Seigle Homestead. Extends into Holland Township, Hunterdon County
13	First Methodist Episcopal Church	First Methodist Episcopal Church	July 17, 2017 (#100001322)	116 E. Washington Ave. 40°45′34″N 74°58′36″W	Washington	Known as United Methodist Church
14	Great Meadows Railroad Station	Great Meadows Railroad Station	March 23, 1989 (#89000229)	Cemetery Rd. 40°53′01″N 74°54′29″W	Great Meadows	
15	Hixson–Mixsell House	Hixson–Mixsell House	May 12, 2014 (#14000204)	157 County Route 519, Springtown; 40°38′52″N 75°08′54″W	Pohatcong Township	Also known as Springtown Stagecoach Inn
16	Hixson–Skinner Mill Complex	Hixson–Skinner Mill Complex	December 2, 1982 (#82001047)	Still Valley Road; 40°39′16″N 75°08′10″W	Pohatcong Township	Also known as Cole's Grist Mill Complex
17	Hope Historic District	Hope Historic District	July 20, 1973 (#73001138)	Roughly bounded by Beaver Brook, Washington Street, and Brookaloo Swamp; 40°54′42″N 74°58′13″W	Hope	Includes St. Luke's Episcopal Church
18	George Hunt House	George Hunt House	September 12, 1979 (#79001531)	SW of Alpha at 135 Warren Glen Road; 40°35′54″N 75°10′57″W	Pohatcong Township	
19	Imlaydale Historic District	Imlaydale Historic District	March 27, 1991 (#91000306)	Imlaydale Road and surrounding land between NJ 31 and the Musconetcong River, Washington and Lebanon Townships; 40°42′47″N 74°58′07″W	Washington Township	Extends into Lebanon Township, Hunterdon County
20	Johnsonburg Historic District	Johnsonburg Historic District	October 15, 1992 (#92001386)	NJ 519 and 661 and adjacent parts of Mott and Allamuchy Roads, Johnsonburg; 40°57′59″N 74°52′36″W	Frelinghuysen Township	
21	Kennedy House and Mill	Kennedy House and Mill	May 16, 1996 (#96000552)	306 NJ 173, Kennedy Mills; 40°39′41″N 75°06′56″W	Greenwich Township	
22	Lander–Stewart Mansion and Stites Building	Lander–Stewart Mansion and Stites Building	June 26, 2008 (#08000561)	102–104 South Main Street; 40°41′23″N 75°12′04″W	Phillipsburg	
23	Miller Farmstead	Miller Farmstead	September 11, 1989 (#88002118)	NJ 57; 40°47′09″N 74°53′42″W	Mansfield Township	Extends into Lebanon Township, Hunterdon County
24	Morris Canal	Morris Canal	October 1, 1974 (#74002228)	Irregular line beginning at Phillipsburg and ending at Jersey City; 40°41′08″N 75°09′49″W	Not Applicable	Delaware River Portal, the western terminus, is in Phillispburg
25	Mount Bethel Methodist Church	Mount Bethel Methodist Church	February 29, 1980 (#80002526)	W of Hackettstown at intersection of Mount Bethel Rd. and Snyder Rd. 40°49′32″N 74°54′07″W	Mansfield	
26	New Hampton Pony Pratt Truss Bridge	New Hampton Pony Pratt Truss Bridge	July 26, 1977 (#77000877)	Rymon Road over the Musconetcong River; 40°43′14″N 74°57′49″W	Washington Township	Includes Hunterdon County, Shoddy Mill Road, New Hampton
27	Old Mine Road Historic District	Old Mine Road Historic District	December 3, 1980 (#80000410)	NJ 521, Delaware, Old Mine, and River Roads; 41°05′20″N 74°57′40″W	Not Applicable	Extends into Sussex County
28	Oxford Furnace	Oxford Furnace	July 6, 1977 (#77000919)	Belvidere and Washington Avenues; 40°48′14″N 74°59′52″W	Oxford	
29	Oxford Industrial Historic District	Oxford Industrial Historic District	August 27, 1992 (#91001471)	NJ Route 31; Belvidere, Buckley, and Washington avenues; Jonestown and Mine Hill roads; Academy and Church streets, and vicinity 40°47′55″N 74°59′42″W	Oxford Township	Includes Oxford Furnace and Shippen Manor
30	Perry–Petty Farmstead	Perry–Petty Farmstead	April 9, 1999 (#99000392)	882 Jackson Valley Road; 40°48′09″N 74°56′20″W	Mansfield Township	
31	Phillipsburg Commercial Historic District	Phillipsburg Commercial Historic District	October 8, 2008 (#08000973)	29-169 S. Main St., 60-178 S. Main St., 3 Hudson St., 9 and 12-30 Morris St./Main St., 7-11, 17, and 21-27 Union Sq. 40°41′29″N 75°12′08″W	Phillipsburg	Includes Lander–Stewart Mansion and Stites Building
32	Pleasant Valley Historic District	Pleasant Valley Historic District	February 17, 1994 (#94000013)	Area surrounding Mill Pond Road; 40°44′57″N 75°00′21″W	Washington Township	
33	Port Colden Historic District	Port Colden Historic District	January 21, 1999 (#98001639)	Roughly along Port Colden Road, Lock Street, NJ 57, and Morris Canal Terrace, Port Colden; 40°45′55″N 74°57′19″W	Washington Township	,
34	Port Murray Historic District	Port Murray Historic District	June 7, 1996 (#96000658)	Roughly, Port Murray Road from Cherry Tree Bend Road to Hoffman Road, Port Murray; 40°47′31″N 74°54′51″W	Mansfield Township	
35	Ramsaysburg Homestead	Ramsaysburg Homestead	October 27, 2004 (#04001194)	U.S. Route 46; 40°52′40″N 75°03′21″W	Knowlton Township	
36	John Richey House	John Richey House	March 20, 2002 (#02000216)	6 Schnetzer Lane; 40°43′05″N 75°00′03″W	Franklin Township	
37	John Roseberry Homestead	John Roseberry Homestead	April 3, 1973 (#73001139)	540 Warren St. 40°41′19″N 75°10′54″W	Phillipsburg	
38	Rutherfurd Hall	Rutherfurd Hall	April 24, 2013 (#11000592)	County Route 517 and Interstate Route 80; 40°54′52″N 74°48′48″W	Allamuchy Township	
39	St. James Lutheran Church and Cemetery	St. James Lutheran Church and Cemetery	October 24, 2016 (#16000737)	1213 U.S. Route 22; 40°40′49″N 75°08′45″W	Pohatcong Township	Cemetery is in Greenwich Township
40	Seigle Homestead	Seigle Homestead	November 7, 1977 (#77000918)	Riegelsville-Warren Glen Road; 40°36′43″N 75°09′54″W	Finesville	
41	Shippen Manor	Shippen Manor	December 20, 1984 (#84000517)	Belvidere Rd. 40°48′19″N 74°59′51″W	Oxford	
42	Spring Valley Christian Church Site	Spring Valley Christian Church Site	September 18, 1997 (#97001147)	Spring Valley Rd., 0.5 mi (0.80 km). E of Hardwick Center; 41°00′20″N 74°56′23″W	Hardwick Township	
43	St. Luke's Episcopal Church	St. Luke's Episcopal Church	March 16, 2007 (#07000151)	346 High Street; 40°54′38″N 74°58′08″W	Hope	
44	Van Nest–Hoff–Vannatta Farmstead	Van Nest–Hoff–Vannatta Farmstead	December 28, 2005 (#05001484)	Cty Rd. 519; 40°45′47″N 75°07′49″W	Harmony	
45	Vass Farmstead	Vass Farmstead	September 17, 1999 (#99001170)	109 Stillwater Road; 41°00′10″N 74°54′58″W	Hardwick Township	
46	Warrington Stone Bridge	Warrington Stone Bridge	December 16, 1977 (#77000917)	Brugler Road over Paulins Kill, Warrington; 40°56′09″N 75°04′17″W	Knowlton Township	
47	Washington Railroad Station	Washington Railroad Station	July 3, 1979 (#79001532)	Railroad Ave. 40°45′30″N 74°58′06″W	Washington	
