= Petty House =

Petty house is regional British English for an outhouse.

It may also refer to:

in the United States

(by state then city)

- Petty House (San Antonio), Texas
- Petty–Roberts–Beatty House, historic octagon house in Clayton, Alabama, listed on the National Register of Historic Places (NRHP)
- Perry–Petty Farmstead, Mansfield Township, New Jersey, listed on the NRHP in Warren County
- Buckingham-Petty House, Duncan Falls, Ohio, listed on the NRHP in Muskingum County
- Petty House (Hot Springs, South Dakota), listed on the NRHP in Fall River County
- Crawford-Pettyjohn House, Pierre, South Dakota, listed on the NRHP in Hughes County
