= Kennedy Mills =

Kennedy Mills may refer to:

- Kennedy Mills, New Jersey
  - Kennedy House and Mill, listed on the NRHP in Warren County, New Jersey
- Kennedy Mills, New York
- McConnel & Kennedy Mills, cotton mills in Manchester, England
