= John Roseberry Homestead =

Historic house in New Jersey, United States

- U.S. National Register of Historic Places
- New Jersey Register of Historic Places
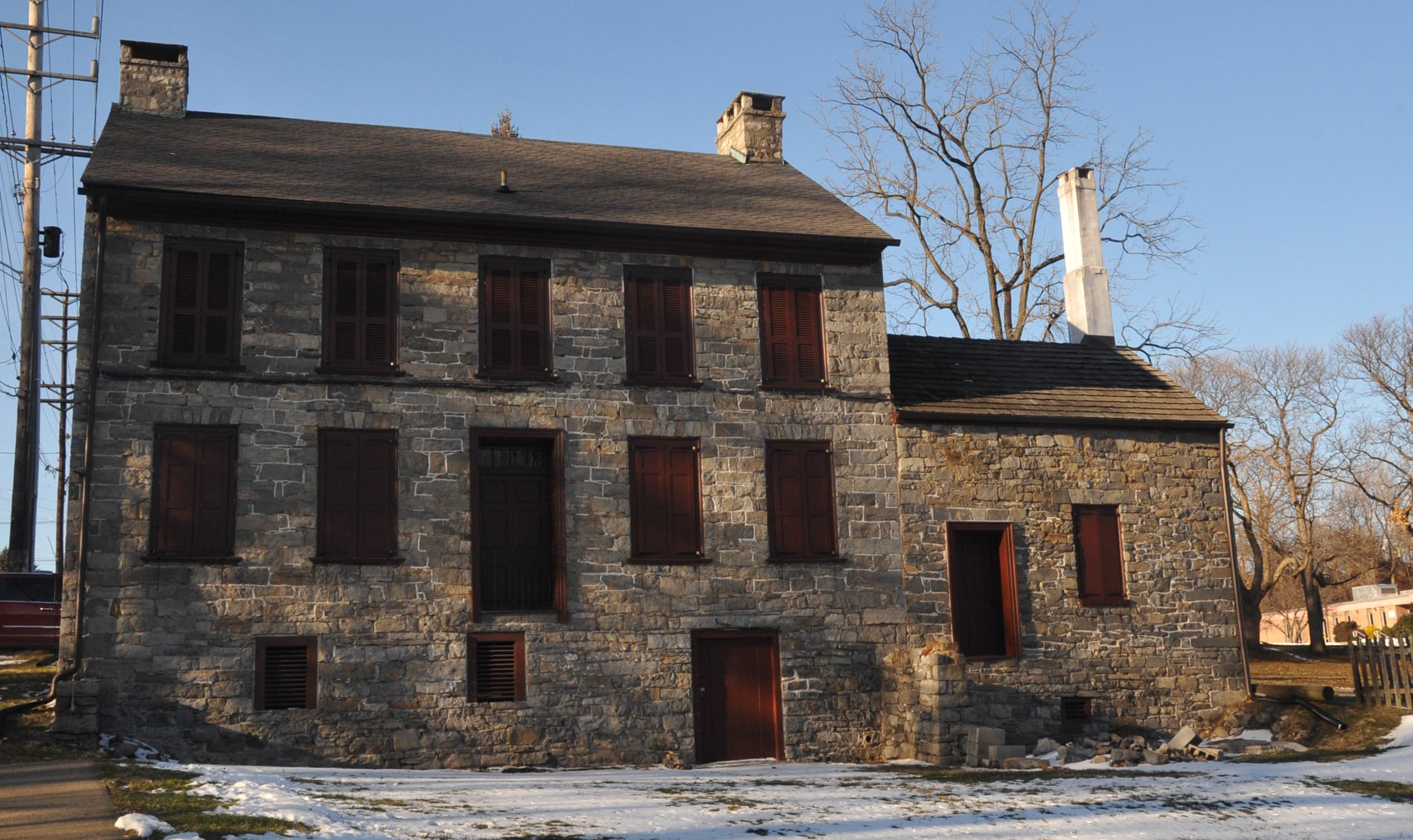

- Location within Warren County, New Jersey Location within New Jersey Location within the United States
- Location: 540 Warren Street, Phillipsburg, New Jersey
- Coordinates: 40°41′19″N 75°10′54″W
- NRHP reference No.: 73001139
- NJRHP No.: 2785

Significant dates
- Added to NRHP: April 3, 1973
- Designated NJRHP: October 18, 1972

The Roseberry Homestead, also known as the Walter Gess House, is a classic Georgian house, erected of rough-cut quarry stone between 1765 and 1783 located at 540 Warren Street in the town of Phillipsburg in Warren County, New Jersey, United States. It was added to the National Register of Historic Places on April 3, 1973, for its significance in architecture and exploration/settlement.

== History and description ==
The house is a two-story, five-bay plan house, two rooms deep, with a center through hall. There is an attached 1 1/2-story stone kitchen, probably built before the main house. There are three chimneys—two rising from the gable ends of the main block, and the third from the gable end of the kitchen. There is a large cooking fireplace in the kitchen, with a removed brick oven. A winder stair on the fireplace wall leads to the loft above. The front of the house is on the downhill side, allowing for a walk-in cellar. A porch extended across the entire front, permitting access to the higher level first floor, but that has long since disappeared. John Roseberry Sr. was one of the original settlers in Phillipsburg. It is very likely the oldest existing structure in town.

The Roseberry Homestead has fallen into considerable disrepair, and has been boarded up for at least 15 years. The exterior remains in relatively good condition, and the interior walls and wide board floors appear to be in safe condition. Ceilings are partially collapsed and lath is showing. There are no remaining windows, and most of the doors and staircase baluster are gone. Several of the eight fireplace mantels appear to be late eighteenth century, but much of the interior woodwork is nineteenth century, and there appears to be none of the original hardware.

== See also ==
- National Register of Historic Places listings in Warren County, New Jersey
