= Mount Bethel Methodist Church =

Historic church in New Jersey, United States

- U.S. National Register of Historic Places
- New Jersey Register of Historic Places
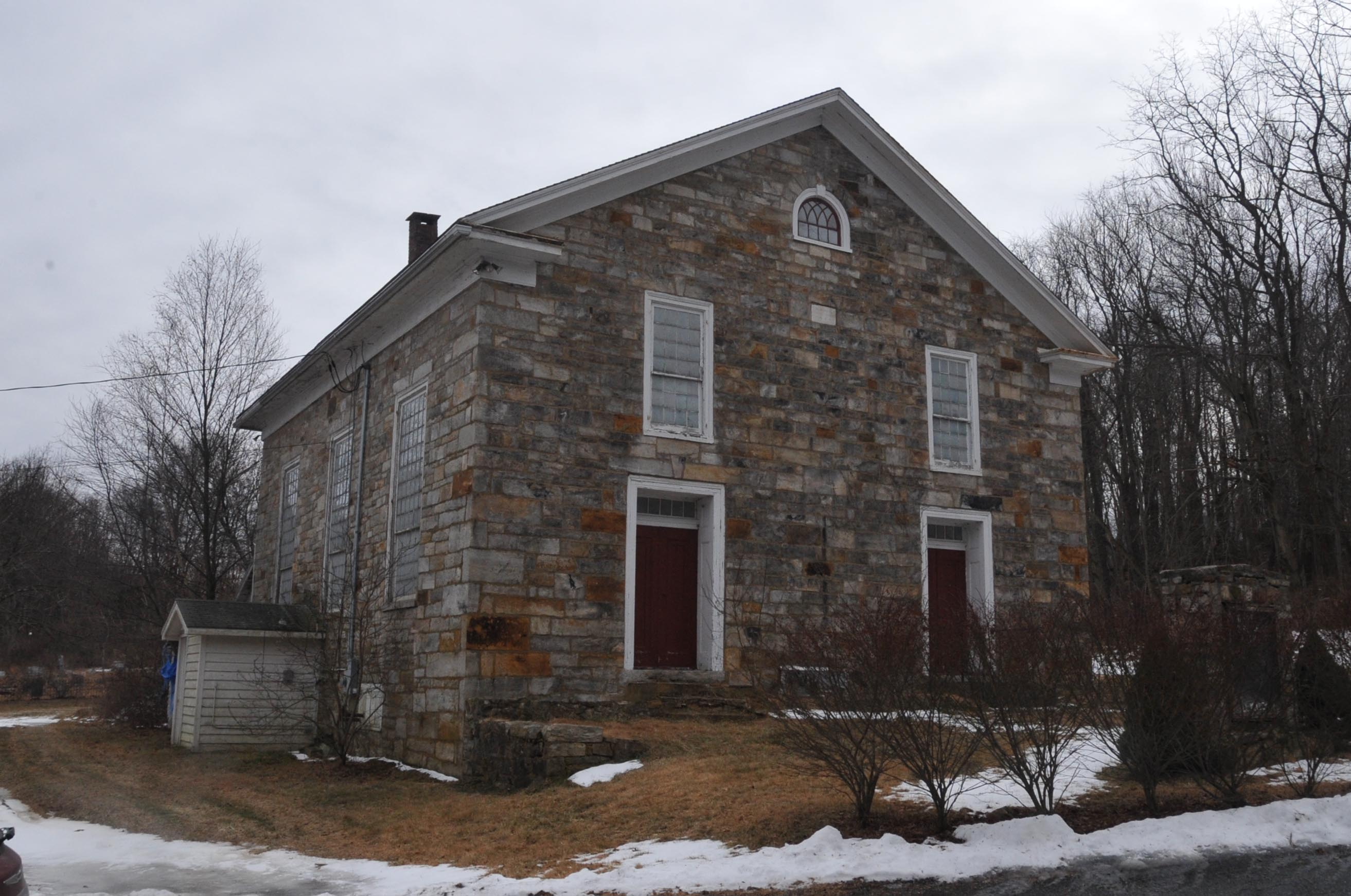

- Location within Warren County, New Jersey Location within New Jersey Location within the United States
- Nearest city: Hackettstown, New Jersey
- Coordinates: 40°49′32″N 74°54′7″W
- Area: 2 acres (0.81 ha)
- Built: 1844
- Architectural style: Greek Revival, Vernacular Greek Revival
- NRHP reference No.: 80002526
- NJRHP No.
- Added to NRHP: February 29, 1980

Mount Bethel Methodist Church is a historic church in the Port Murray section of Mansfield Township, Warren County, New Jersey, United States.

It was built in 1844 in Vernacular Greek Revival style. It was added to the National Register of Historic Places in 1980.

== See also ==
- National Register of Historic Places listings in Warren County, New Jersey
