= John Richey House =

- U.S. National Register of Historic Places
- New Jersey Register of Historic Places
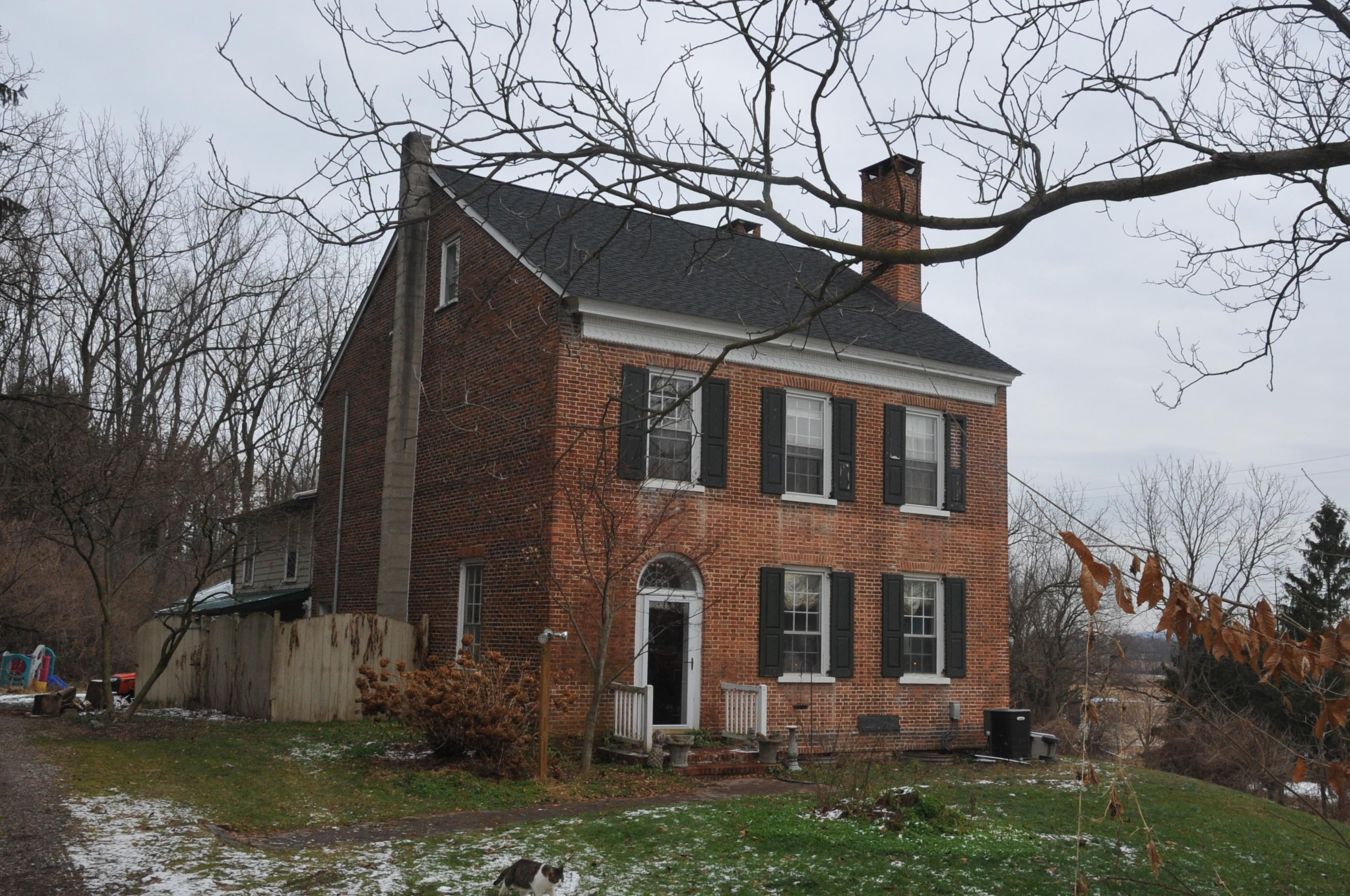

- Location within Warren County, New Jersey Location within New Jersey Location within the United States
- Location: 6 Schnetzer Lane, Franklin Township, New Jersey
- Coordinates: 40°43′05.3″N 75°0′03.4″W
- Area: 34 acres (14 ha)
- Built: c. 1785–1800
- Architectural style: Federal
- NRHP reference No.: 02000216
- NJRHP No.: 3956

Significant dates
- Added to NRHP: March 20, 2002
- Designated NJRHP: January 8, 2002

The John Richey House is a historic farmhouse located at 6 Schnetzer Lane in Franklin Township of Warren County, New Jersey, United States. It was built c. 1785–1800 and is on a working farm with 34 acres (14 ha). The farmhouse was added to the National Register of Historic Places on March 20, 2002, for its significance in architecture.

== History and description ==
Around 1785, John Richey purchased 243 acres (98 ha) of farmland from George Baylor. Richey owned a general store in Asbury and was a trustee of the Mansfield Woodhouse Presbyterian Church near Washington. The farmhouse is a two and one-half story brick building featuring Federal architecture. It was built c. 1785–1800 and enlarged in 1950 with a two-story frame addition. A spring house also contributes to the listing.

== See also ==
- National Register of Historic Places listings in Warren County, New Jersey
