= Vass Farmstead =

- U.S. National Register of Historic Places
- New Jersey Register of Historic Places
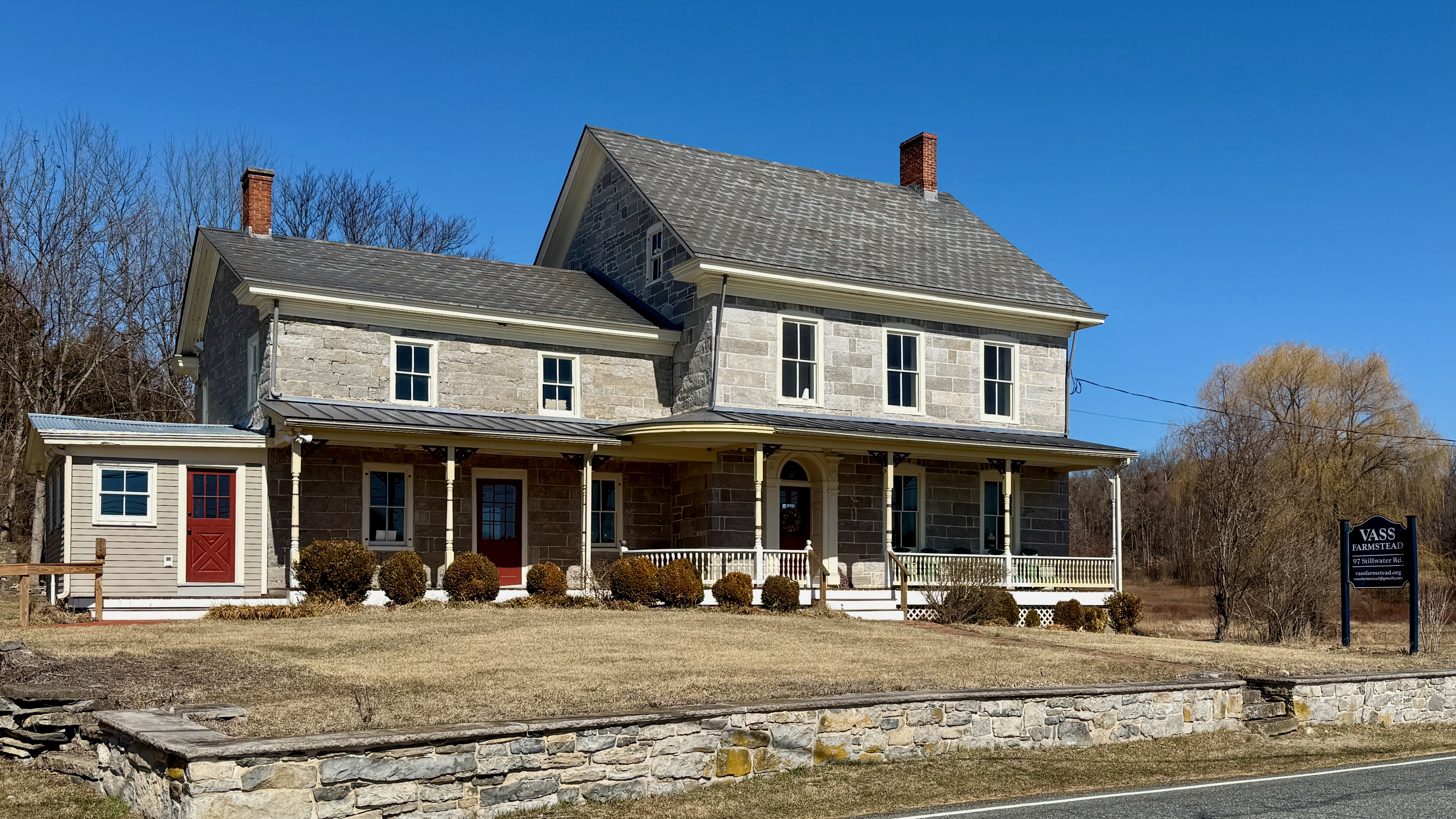
- Vass Farmhouse in 2025

- Location within Warren County, New Jersey Location within New Jersey Location within the United States
- Location: 109 Stillwater Road, Hardwick Township, New Jersey
- Coordinates: 41°00′10″N 74°54′58″W
- Area: 27 acres (11 ha)
- Built: 1812
- Architectural style: Federal, Georgian
- NRHP reference No.: 99001170
- NJRHP No.: 192

Significant dates
- Added to NRHP: September 17, 1999
- Designated NJRHP: July 27, 1999

The Vass Farmstead is located at 109 Stillwater Road in Hardwick Township of Warren County, New Jersey, United States. Built in 1812, the historic stone farmhouse overlooks White Lake in the valley of the Paulins Kill and features a mix of Federal and Georgian architectural styles. It was added to the National Register of Historic Places on September 17, 1999, for its significance in agriculture and architecture.

In 1764, Martin Swartwelder purchased 548.5 acres (222.0 ha) from Adam Cunkle. After his death, the property was sold to John Vass, a German emigrant, in 1802. His son, Isaac Vass inherited it in 1852. His son, Frank Vass inherited it in 1893 and sold it to George Van Riper in 1922. The listing also includes a contributing barn and lime kiln.

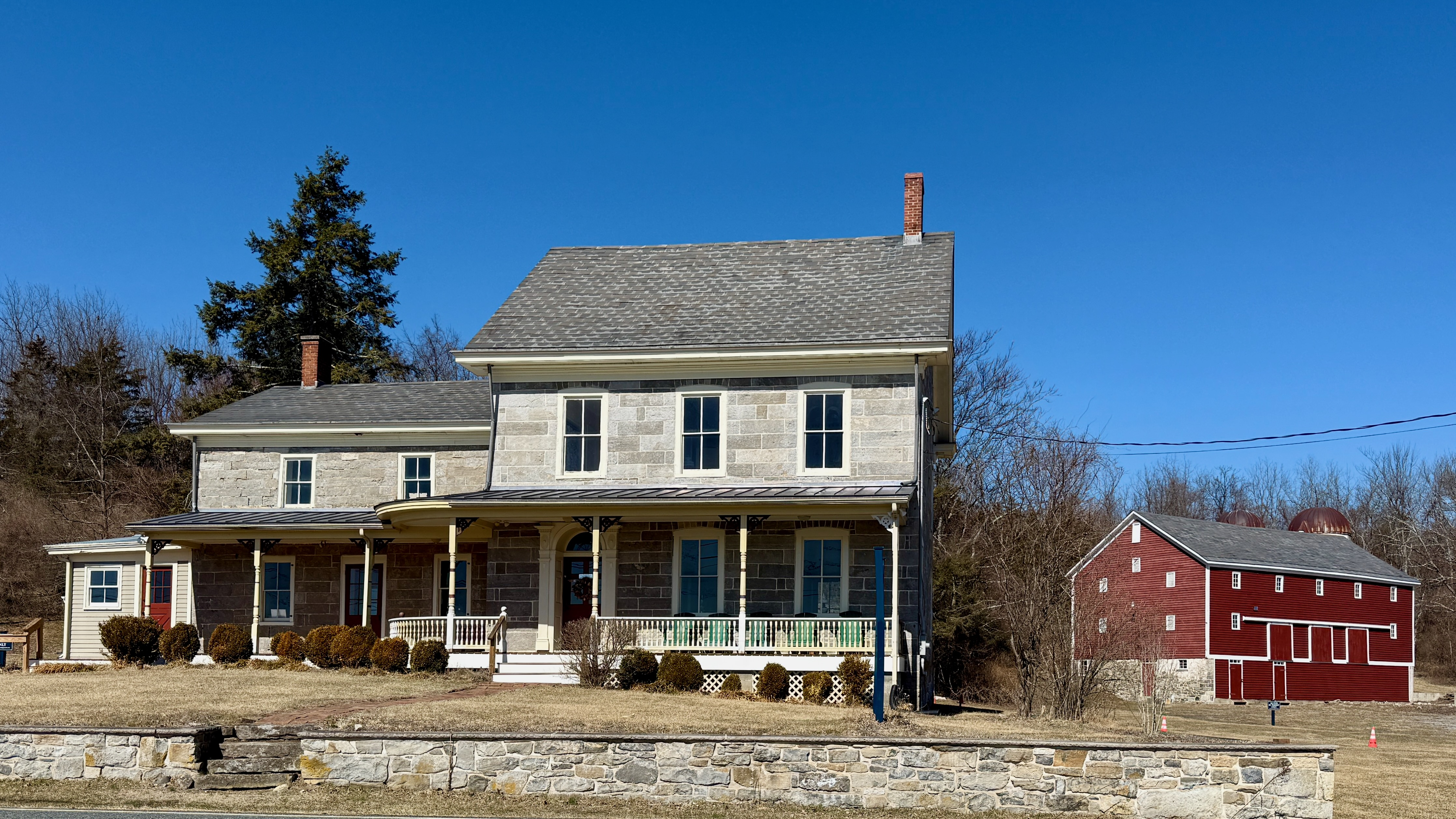
Area view, including barn

== See also ==
- National Register of Historic Places listings in Warren County, New Jersey
