= Warrington, New Jersey =

Populated place in Warren County, New Jersey, US

- Unincorporated community
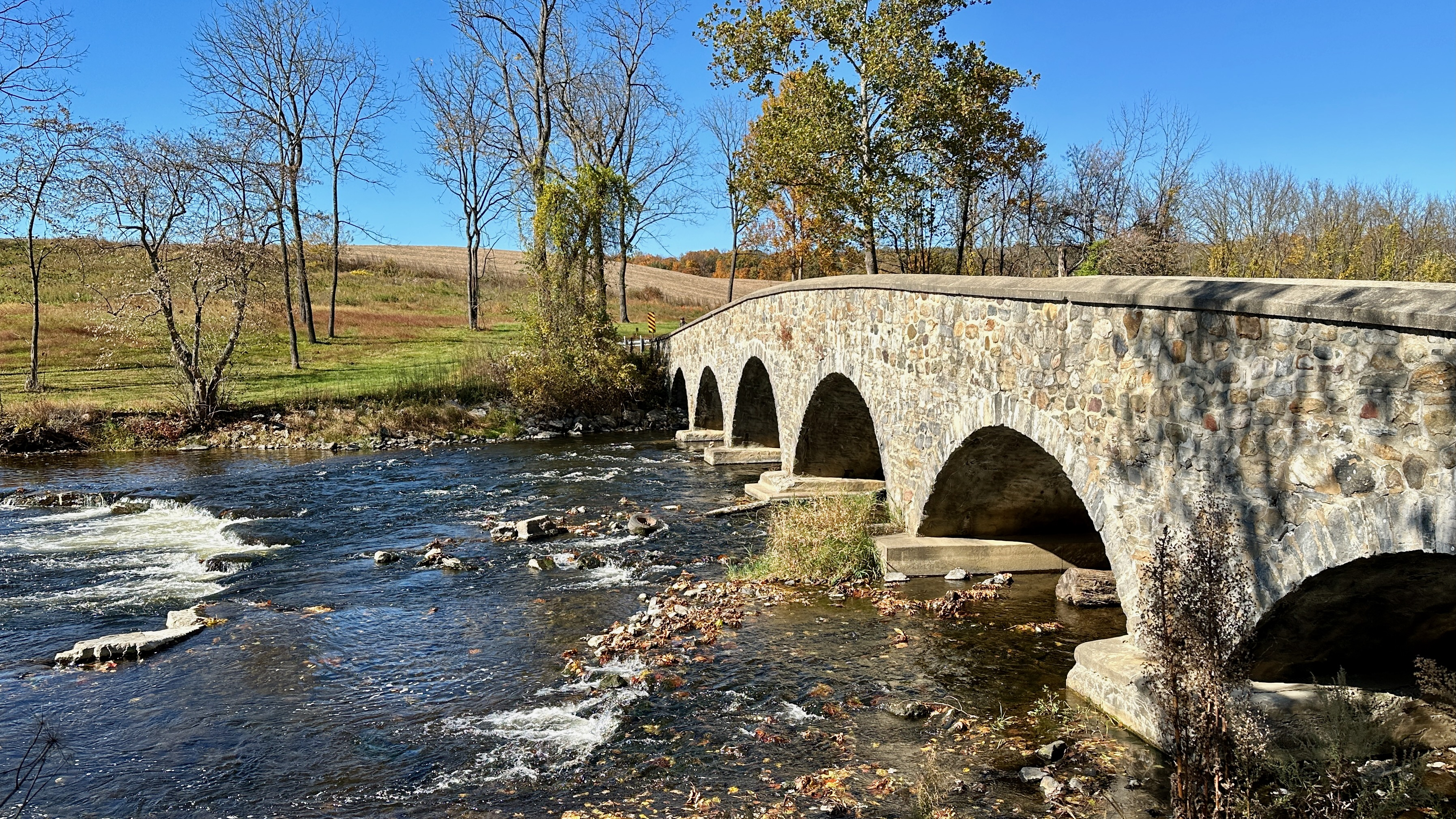
- Warrington Stone Bridge over the Paulins Kill

- Location of Warrington in Warren County. Inset; Location of Warren County within the state of New Jersey. Warrington (New Jersey) Warrington (the United States)
- Coordinates: 40°55′53″N 75°05′03″W
- Country: United States
- State: New Jersey
- County: Warren
- Township: Knowlton
- Elevation: 351 ft (107 m)
- Time zone: UTC−05:00 (Eastern (EST))
  - Summer (DST): UTC−04:00 (EDT)
- GNIS feature ID: 881548

Warrington is an unincorporated community located within Knowlton Township in Warren County, in the U.S. state of New Jersey. It is located on the Paulins Kill, approximately 1 mi (1.6 km) northeast of where it flows into the Delaware River.

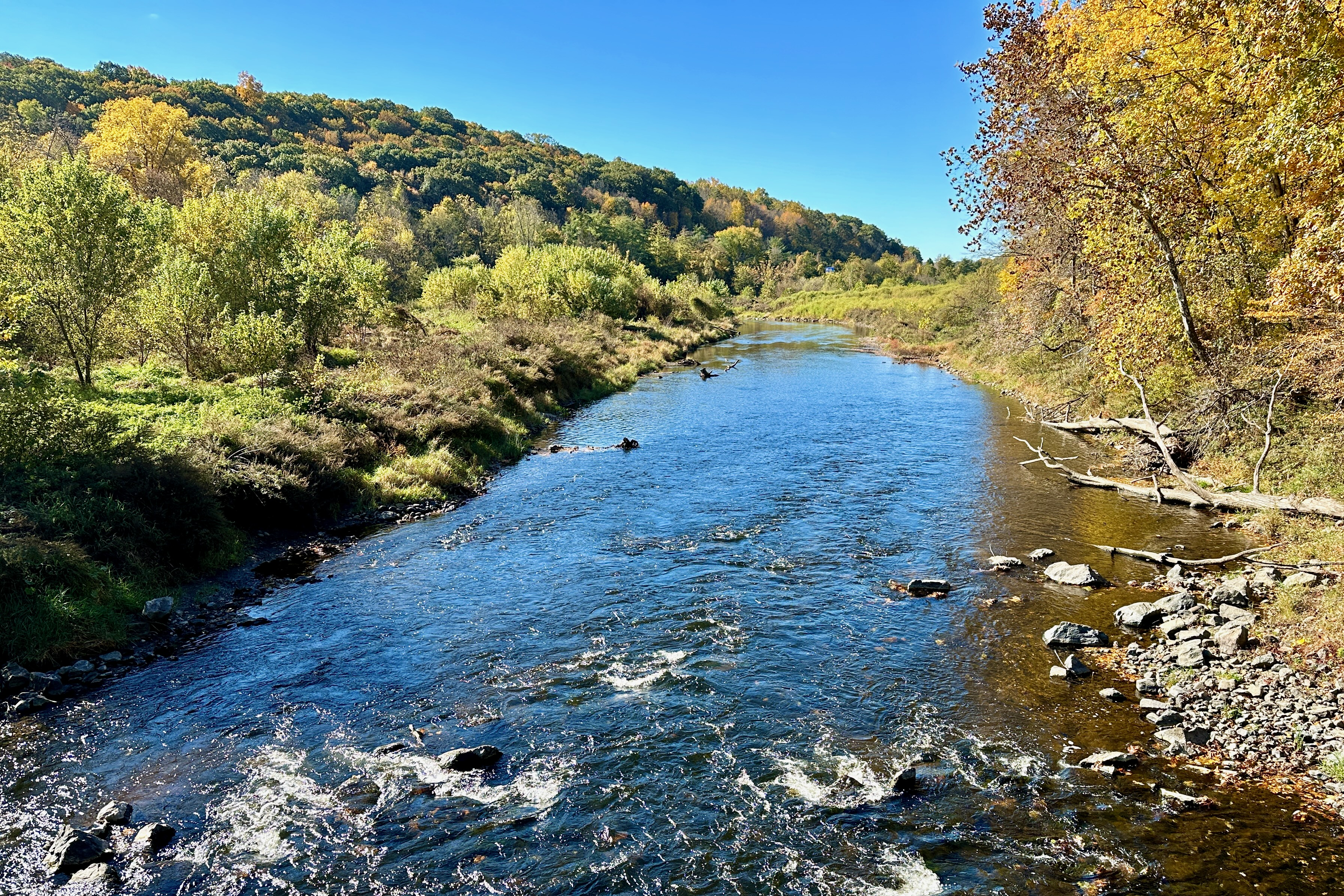
The Paulins Kill flowing southwest near Warrington

== History ==
The early settlement was also known as "Kill Mills" and "Knowlton Mills". It was described as a "thriving little place", with a population of 50 in 1882. There was a blacksmith shop, and a public house known as "Leida's Hotel" or "Foster's Hotel". Warrington had a grist mill in 1890. These were gone by 1911.

A line of the Delaware, Lackawanna and Western Railroad—now abandoned—passed through Warrington.

The Warrington Stone Bridge is located north of the settlement. Built around 1860, it is still the largest stone arch roadway bridge in New Jersey, and is listed on both the New Jersey Register of Historic Places and National Register of Historic Places.
