= Warrington Stone Bridge =

- U.S. National Register of Historic Places
- New Jersey Register of Historic Places
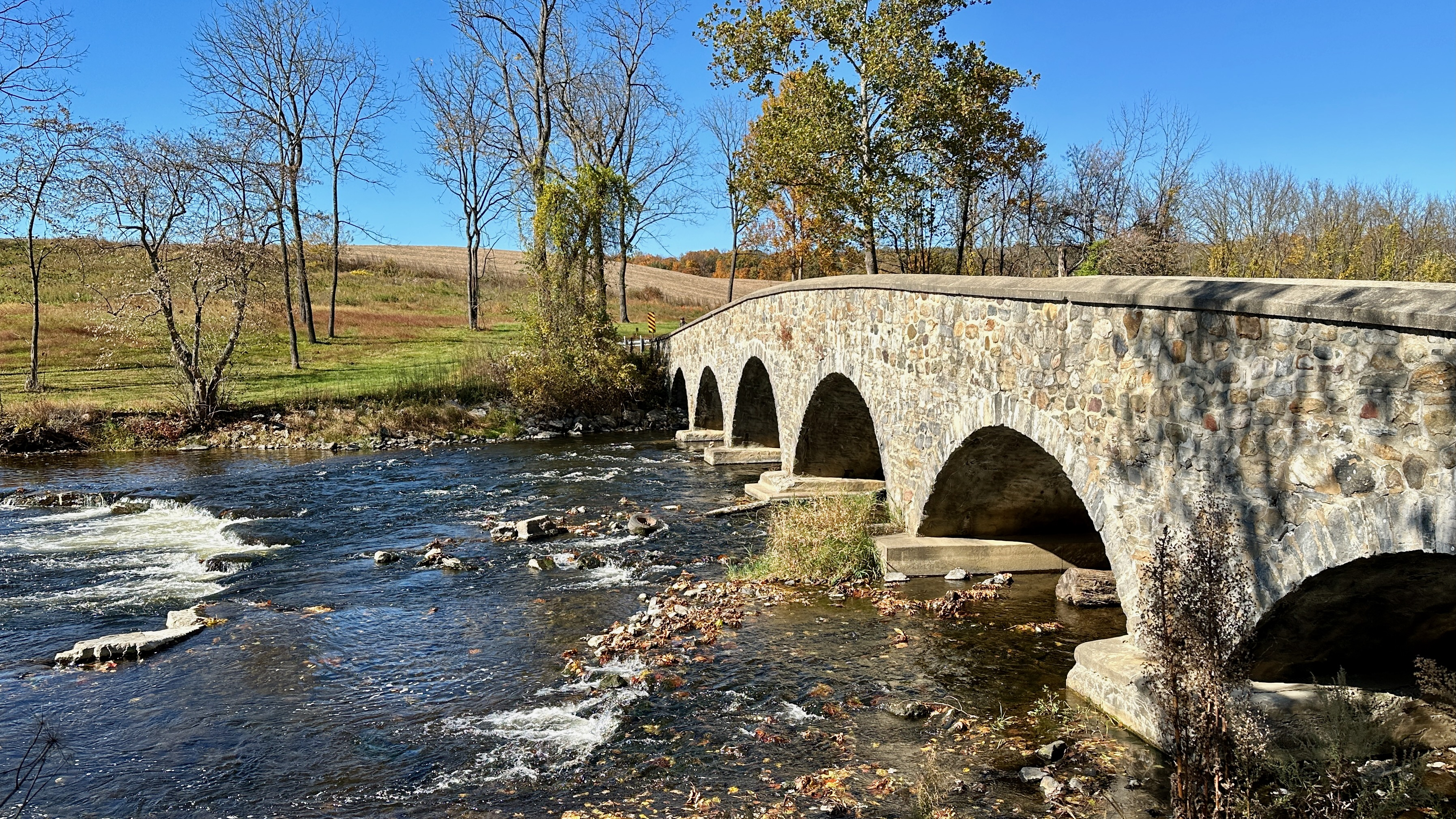
- Warrington Stone Bridge over the Paulins Kill

- Location within Warren County, New Jersey Location within New Jersey Location within the United States
- Location: Brugler Road over the Paulins Kill, Warrington, New Jersey
- Coordinates: 40°56′9″N 75°4′16.5″W
- Built: c. 1860
- Architectural style: Stone Arch
- NRHP reference No.: 77000917
- NJRHP No.: 2769

Significant dates
- Added to NRHP: December 16, 1977
- Designated NJRHP: March 28, 1977

The Warrington Stone Bridge is a historic stone arch bridge carrying Brugler Road over the Paulins Kill in the Warrington section of Knowlton Township in Warren County, New Jersey, United States. The bridge was built c. 1860 and added to the National Register of Historic Places on December 16, 1977, for its significance in transportation.

== History and description ==
The one-lane stone bridge was built in the mid 19th century, c. 1860, and has six barrel-vaulted arches. Its overall length is 183.25 feet (55.85 m) and width 16 feet (4.9 m). According to the nomination form, it is the "largest extant 19th century stone arch bridge in New Jersey" and "one of the most graceful and geometrically correct". It was repaired in 1915 and 1990.

== See also ==
- National Register of Historic Places listings in Warren County, New Jersey
- List of bridges on the National Register of Historic Places in New Jersey
