= Jacob C. Allen House =

Historic house in New Jersey, United States

- U.S. National Register of Historic Places
- New Jersey Register of Historic Places
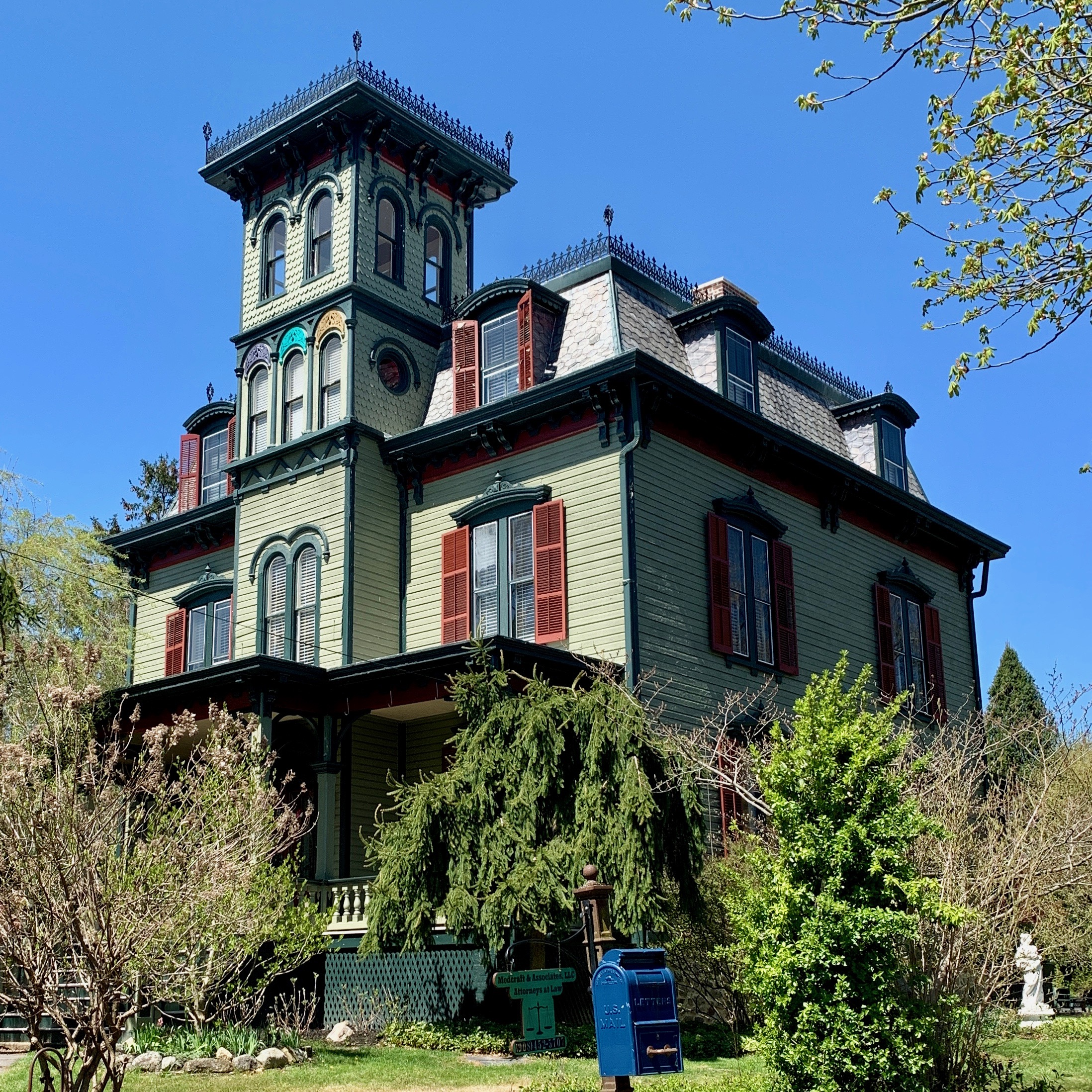
- Jacob C. Allen House in 2020

- Location within Warren County, New Jersey Location within New Jersey Location within the United States
- Location: 206 West Moore Street, Hackettstown, New Jersey
- Coordinates: 40°51′07″N 74°49′50.5″W
- Area: less than one acre
- Built: 1870
- Architectural style: Second Empire
- NRHP reference No.: 05000911
- NJRHP No.: 4563

Significant dates
- Added to NRHP: August 24, 2005
- Designated NJRHP: July 1, 2005

The Jacob C. Allen House is a historic building at 206 West Moore Street in Hackettstown, Warren County, New Jersey. It was built c. 1870 with a Second Empire architectural style. The house was added to the National Register of Historic Places for its significance in architecture on August 24, 2005.

== See also ==
- National Register of Historic Places listings in Warren County, New Jersey
