= Phillipsburg Commercial Historic District =

Historic district in New Jersey, United States

- U.S. National Register of Historic Places
- U.S. Historic district
- New Jersey Register of Historic Places
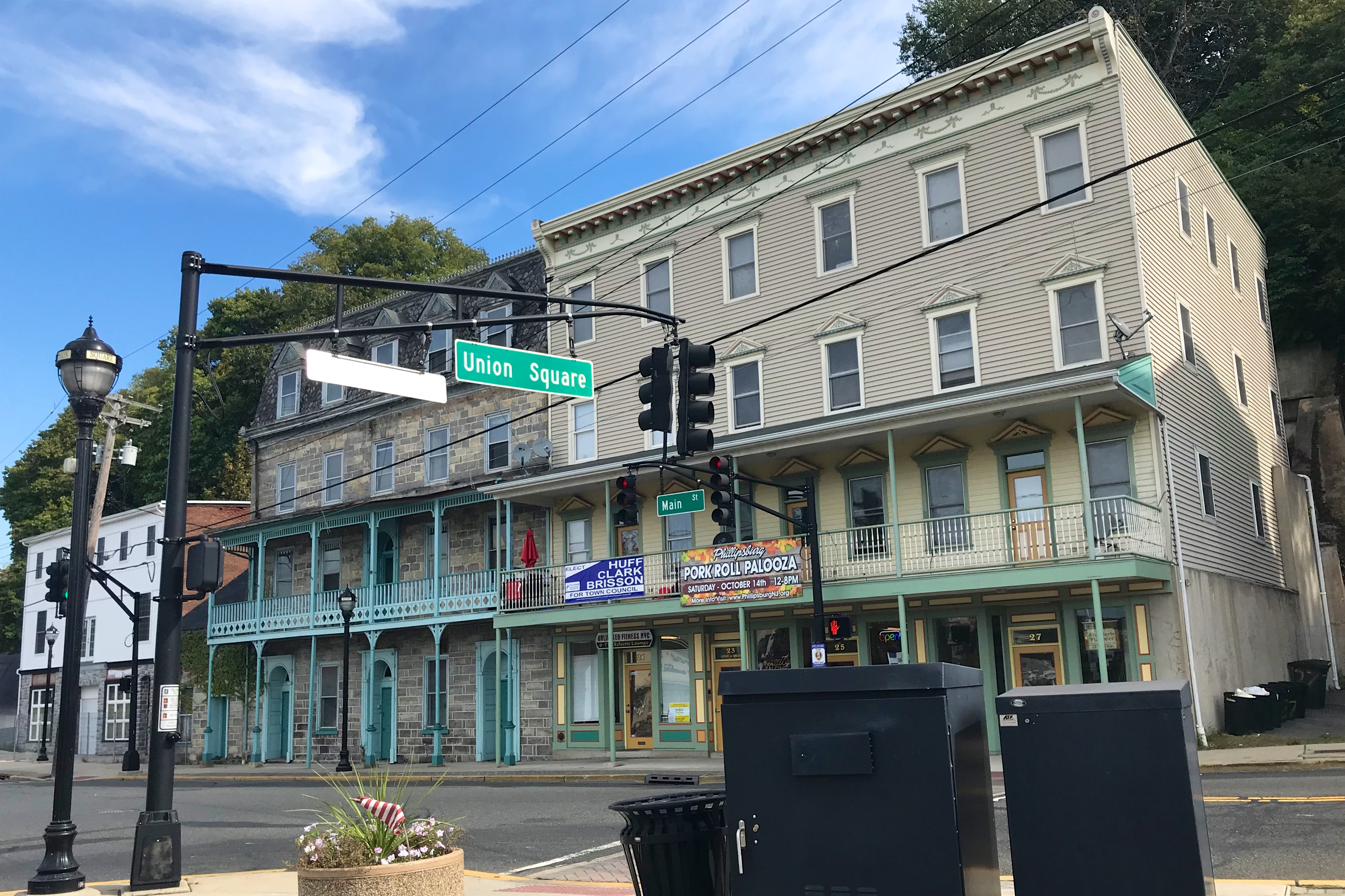
- Union Square, 2017

- Location within Warren County, New Jersey Location within New Jersey Location within the United States
- Location: 29-169 S. Main St., 60-178 S. Main St., 3 Hudson St., 9 and 12-30 Morris St./Main St., 7-11, 17, and 21-27 Union Square; Phillipsburg, New Jersey
- Coordinates: 40°41′29″N 75°12′08″W
- Area: 12.7 acres (5.1 ha)
- Built: 1811
- Architectural style: Italianate, Queen Anne, Second Empire
- NRHP reference No.: 08000973
- NJRHP No.: 4832

Significant dates
- Added to NRHP: October 8, 2008
- Designated NJRHP: August 20, 2008

The Phillipsburg Commercial Historic District is a 12.7-acre (5.1 ha) historic district in the town of Phillipsburg in Warren County, New Jersey, United States. The district was added to the National Register of Historic Places on October 8, 2008, for its local history and representative late 19th and early 20th century commercial structures. It has 66 contributing buildings, including the individually listed Lander–Stewart Mansion and Stites Building, and 4 contributing structures.

== History and description ==
The oldest building in the district is the former Union Hotel located in Union Square. The four-story Federal structure was built in 1811. The Lander–Stewart Mansion was built around 1880 with Italianate architecture and the Stites Building around 1835 with Federal architecture. Union Station was built in 1914 for the Delaware, Lackawanna & Western Railroad.

== Gallery of contributing properties ==
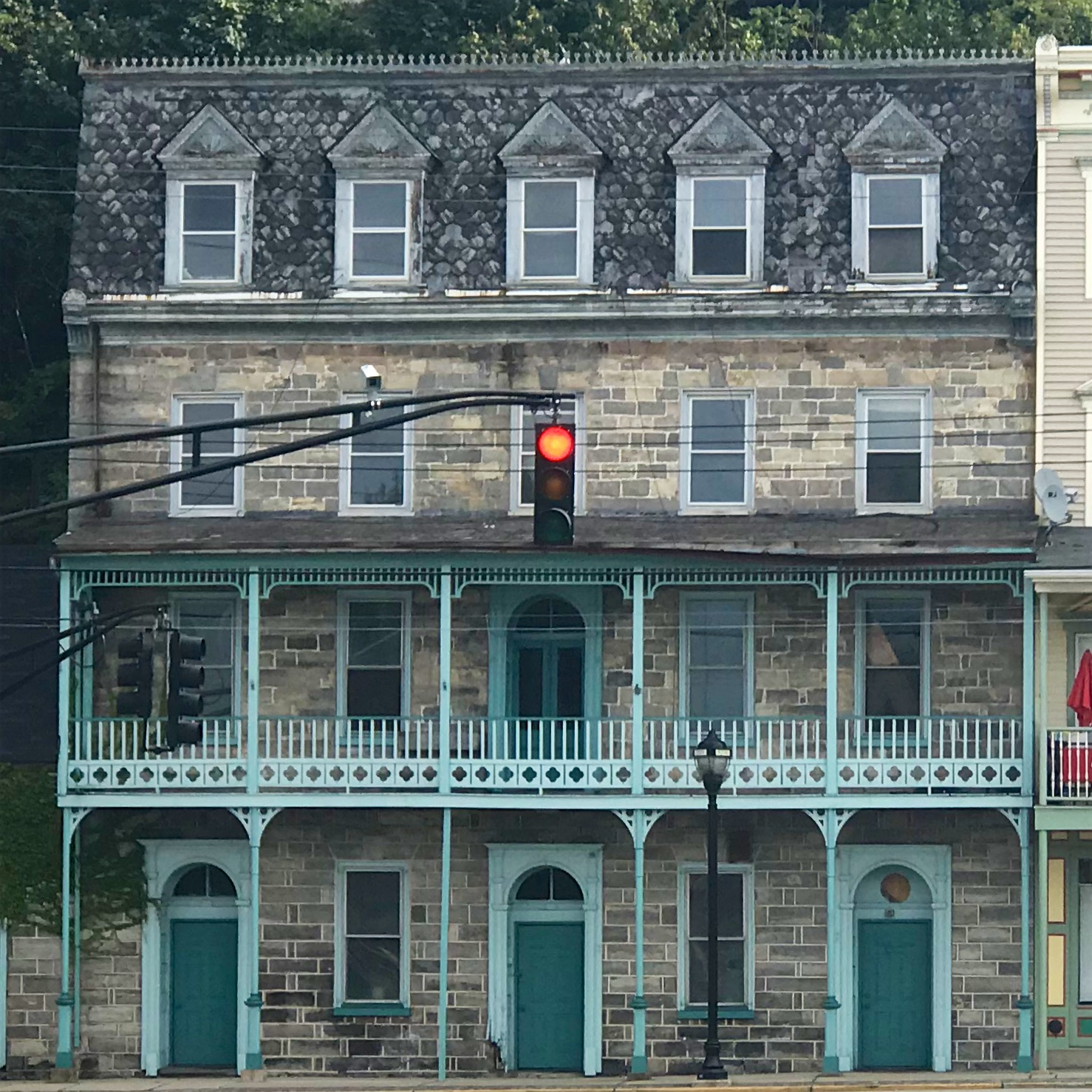
Union Hotel

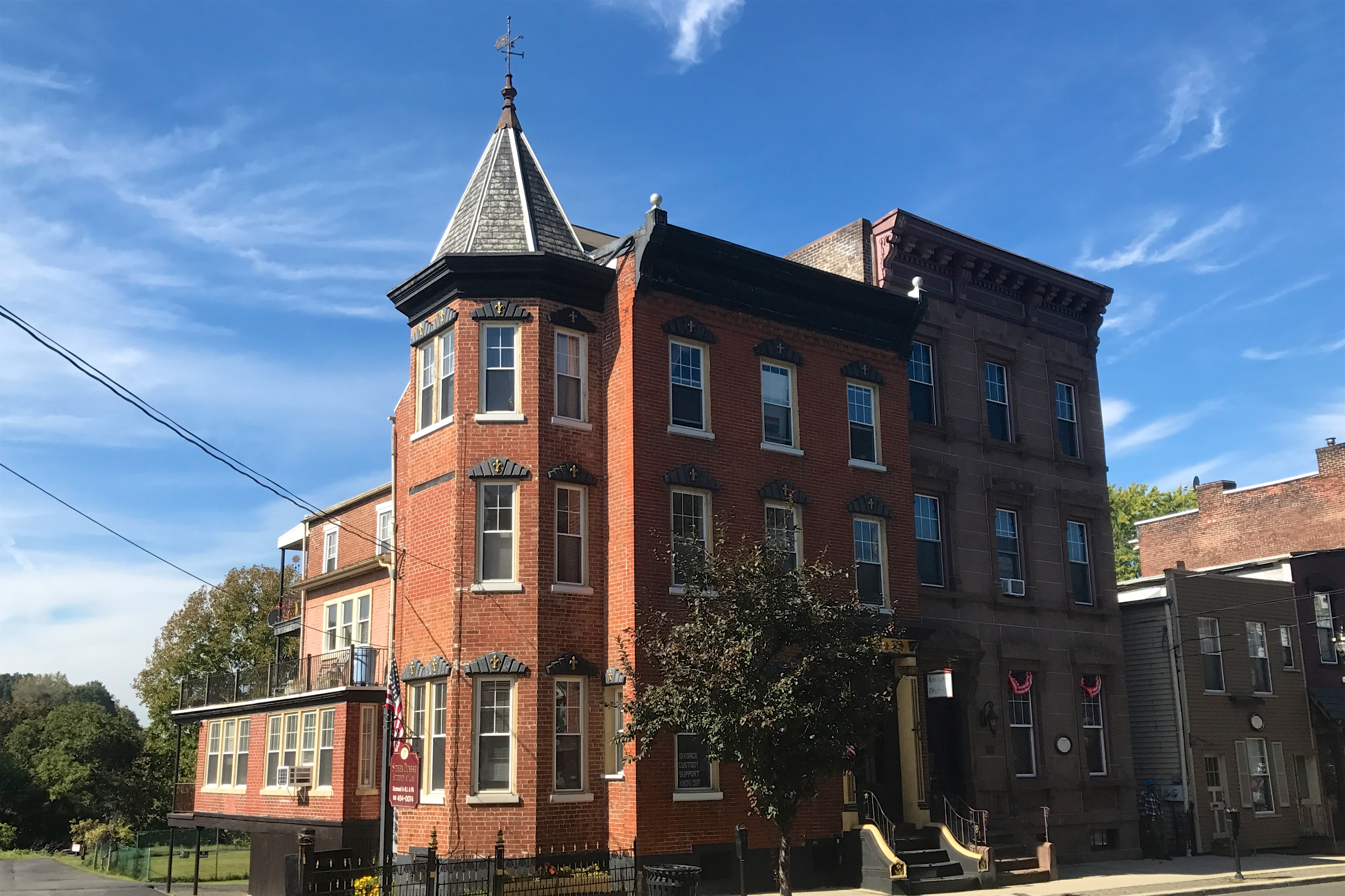
Lander–Stewart Mansion and Stites Building

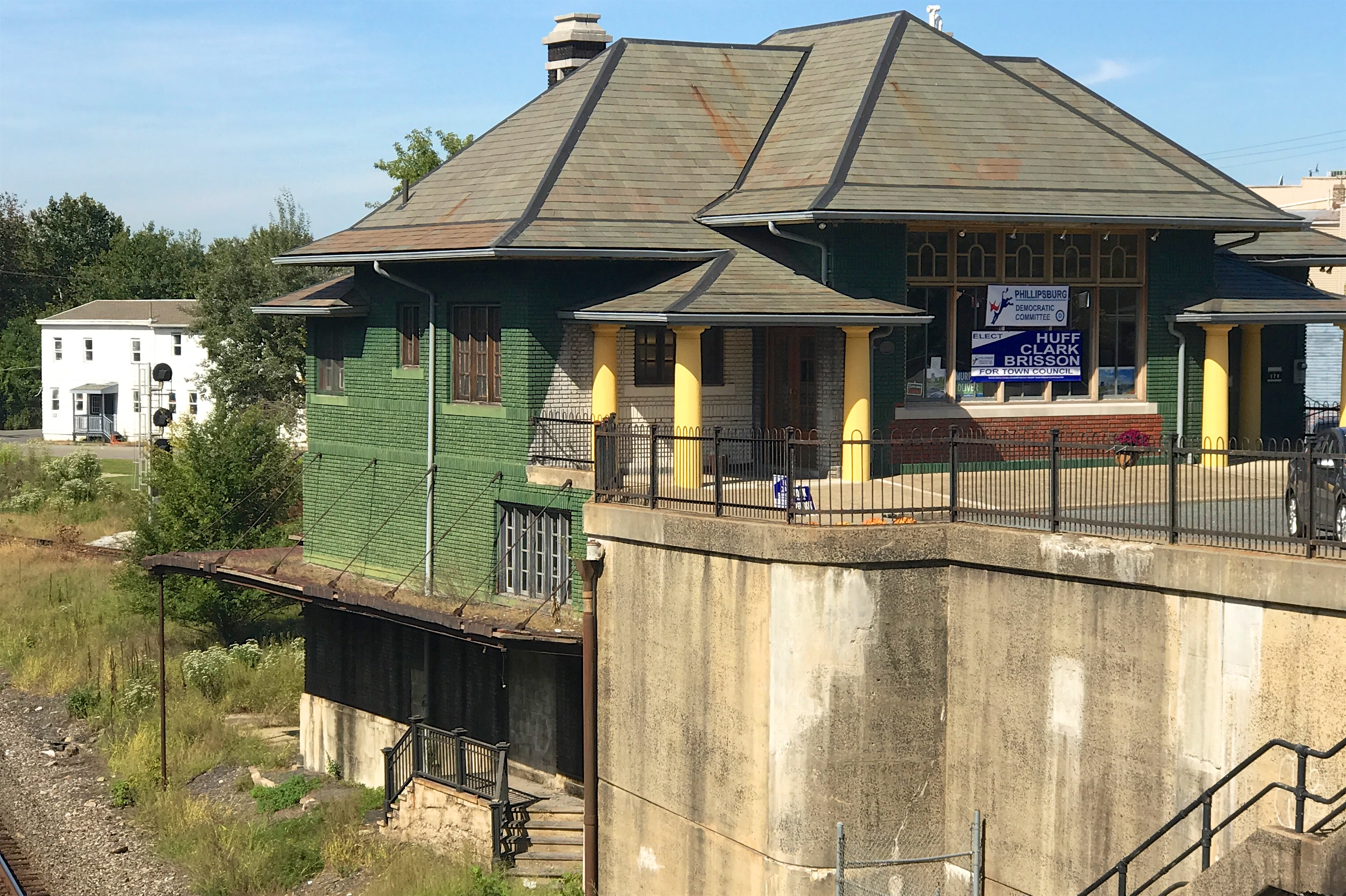
Union Station

== See also ==
- National Register of Historic Places listings in Warren County, New Jersey
