= Great Meadows station =

- U.S. National Register of Historic Places
- New Jersey Register of Historic Places
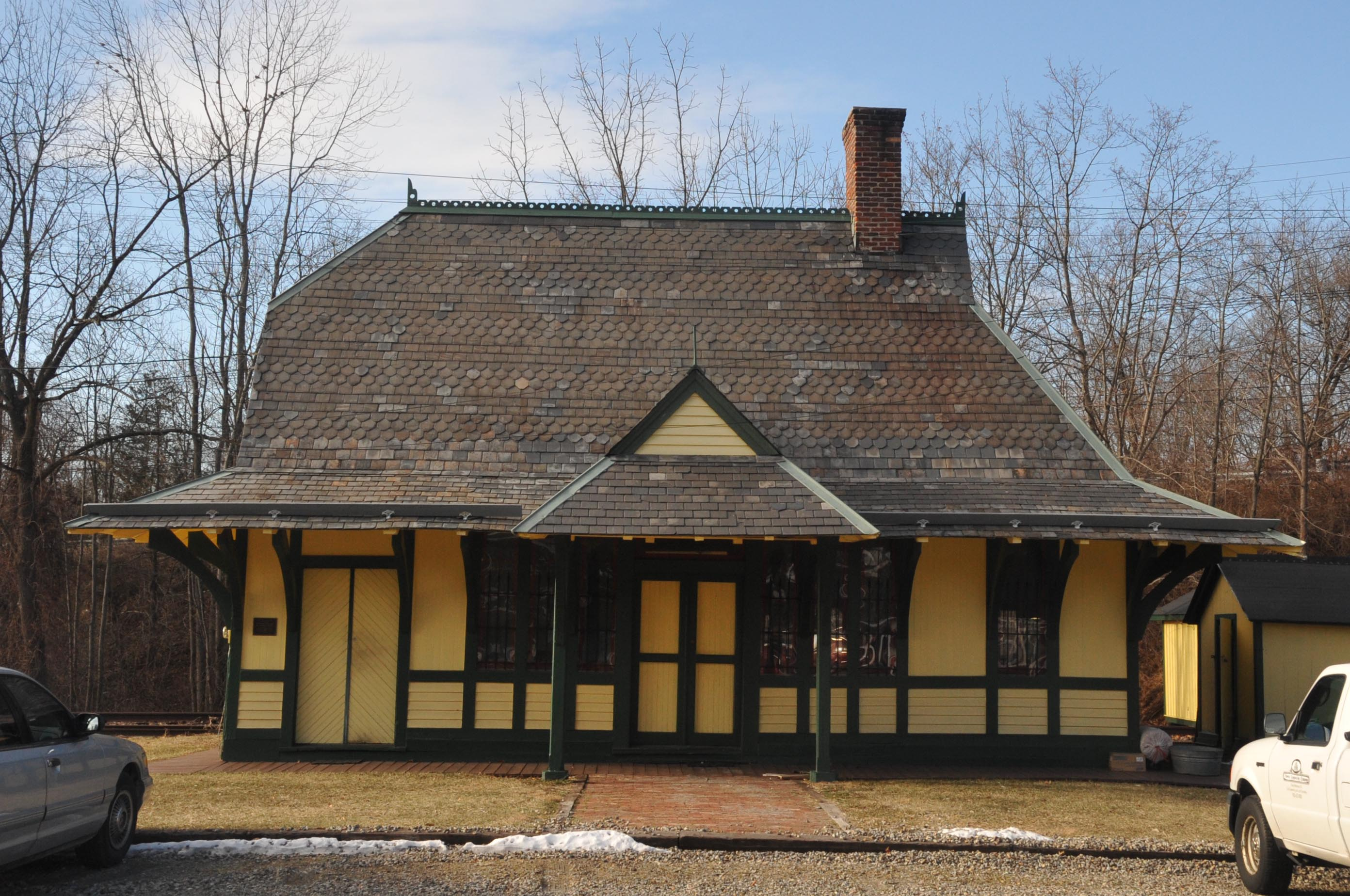

- Location within Warren County, New Jersey Location within New Jersey Location within the United States
- Nearest city: 8 Cemetery Road, Great Meadows, Liberty Township, New Jersey 07838
- Coordinates: 40°52′28″N 74°54′27″W
- Area: 2.7 acres (1.1 ha)
- Built: 1882
- Architectural style: Stick/East lake
- NRHP reference No.: 89000229
- NJRHP No.
- Added to NRHP: March 23, 1989

Great Meadows is a railroad station located in the Great Meadows section of Liberty Township, Warren County, New Jersey, United States. The station was built in 1882 by the Lehigh and Hudson River Railway, and added to the National Register of Historic Places on March 23, 1989.

== See also ==
- National Register of Historic Places listings in Warren County, New Jersey
- Operating Passenger Railroad Stations Thematic Resource (New Jersey)
