= Stewartsville, New Jersey =

Populated place in Warren County, New Jersey, US

- Census-designated place
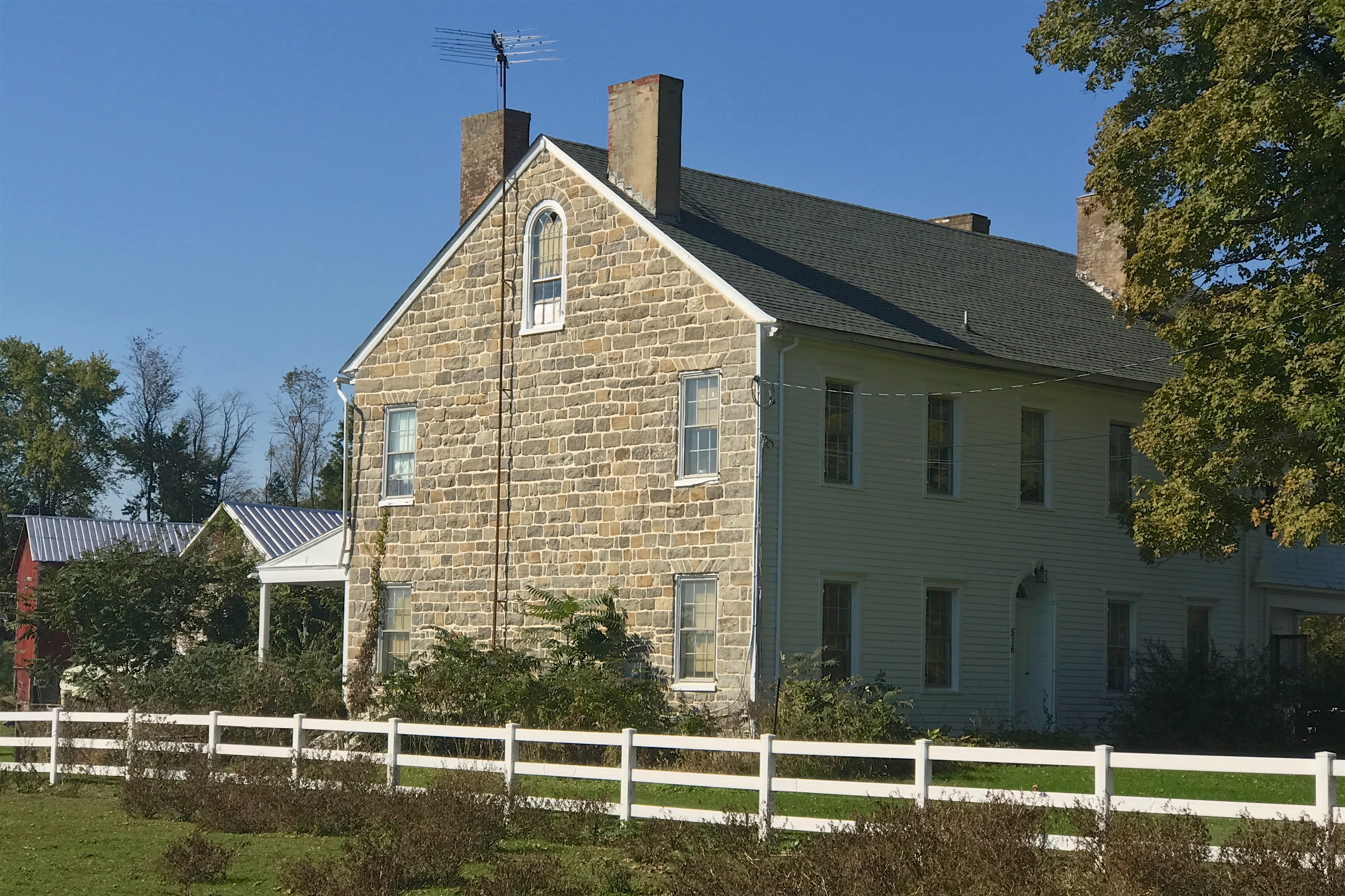
- Hulshizer/Brill farm on North main street built in 1833

- Location in Warren County Location in New Jersey Location in the United States
- Coordinates: 40°41′38″N 75°6′41″W
- Country: United States
- State: New Jersey
- County: Warren
- Township: Greenwich
- Named after: Thomas Stewart

Area
  - Total: 1.08 sq mi (2.80 km^{2})
  - Land: 1.08 sq mi (2.80 km^{2})
  - Water: 0 sq mi (0.00 km^{2}) 0.00%
- Elevation: 315 ft (96 m)

Population (2020)
  - Total: 636
  - Density: 587.9/sq mi (226.98/km^{2})
- Time zone: UTC−05:00 (Eastern (EST))
  - Summer (DST): UTC−04:00 (EDT)
- ZIP Code: 08886
- Area code: 908
- FIPS code: 34-70800
- GNIS feature ID: 2584031

Stewartsville is an unincorporated community and census-designated place (CDP) located within Greenwich Township in Warren County, in the U.S. state of New Jersey, that was created as part of the 2010 United States census. As of the 2020 census, Stewartsville had a population of 636.

The area is served as United States Postal Service ZIP Code 08886.

The community of Stewartsville was named after Thomas Stewart, a secretary to George Washington, who purchased property in the area in 1793.

== Geography ==
According to the United States Census Bureau, the CDP had a total area of 0.129 square miles (0.333 km^{2}), all of which was land.

== Demographics ==
Historical population
Census	Pop.	Note	%±
2010	349		—
2020	636		82.2%
U.S. Decennial Census

Stewartsville first appeared as a census designated place in the 2010 U.S. census.

=== 2020 census ===
StewartsvilleCDP, New Jersey – Racial and ethnic composition Note: the US Census treats Hispanic/Latino as an ethnic category. This table excludes Latinos from the racial categories and assigns them to a separate category. Hispanics/Latinos may be of any race.
Race / Ethnicity (NH = Non-Hispanic)	Pop 2010	Pop 2020	% 2010	% 2020
White alone (NH)	306	527	87.68%	82.86%
Black or African American alone (NH)	16	7	4.58%	1.10%
Native American or Alaska Native alone (NH)	0	0	0.00%	0.00%
Asian alone (NH)	2	18	0.57%	2.83%
Native Hawaiian or Pacific Islander alone (NH)	0	0	0.00%	0.00%
Other race alone (NH)	0	0	0.00%	0.00%
Mixed race or Multiracial (NH)	3	24	0.86%	3.77%
Hispanic or Latino (any race)	22	60	6.30%	9.43%
Total	349	636	100.00%	100.00%

=== 2010 census ===
The 2010 United States census counted 349 people, 134 households, and 96 families in the CDP. The population density was 2,714.4 per square mile (1,048.0/km^{2}). There were 144 housing units at an average density of 1,120.0 per square mile (432.4/km^{2}). The racial makeup was 93.98% (328) White, 4.58% (16) Black or African American, 0.00% (0) Native American, 0.57% (2) Asian, 0.00% (0) Pacific Islander, 0.00% (0) from other races, and 0.86% (3) from two or more races. Hispanic or Latino of any race were 6.30% (22) of the population.

Of the 134 households, 36.6% had children under the age of 18; 52.2% were married couples living together; 14.2% had a female householder with no husband present and 28.4% were non-families. Of all households, 21.6% were made up of individuals and 8.2% had someone living alone who was 65 years of age or older. The average household size was 2.60 and the average family size was 3.05.

26.4% of the population were under the age of 18, 7.4% from 18 to 24, 26.4% from 25 to 44, 27.8% from 45 to 64, and 12.0% who were 65 years of age or older. The median age was 40.3 years. For every 100 females, the population had 97.2 males. For every 100 females ages 18 and older there were 90.4 males.

=== 2000 census ===
As of the 2000 United States census, the population for ZIP Code Tabulation Area 08886 was 4,854.

== Transportation ==
The area is accessible via exit 4 and exit 3 on Interstate 78.

Stewartsville had a station on the Morris and Essex Railroad, located 80 miles (130 km) from New York City.

== Points of interest ==
The nearby Kennedy House and Mill, located on Route 173 in Kennedy Mills, was listed on the National Register of Historic Places in 1996.

The town features two churches, the First Lutheran Church and the Stewartsville Presbyterian Church.

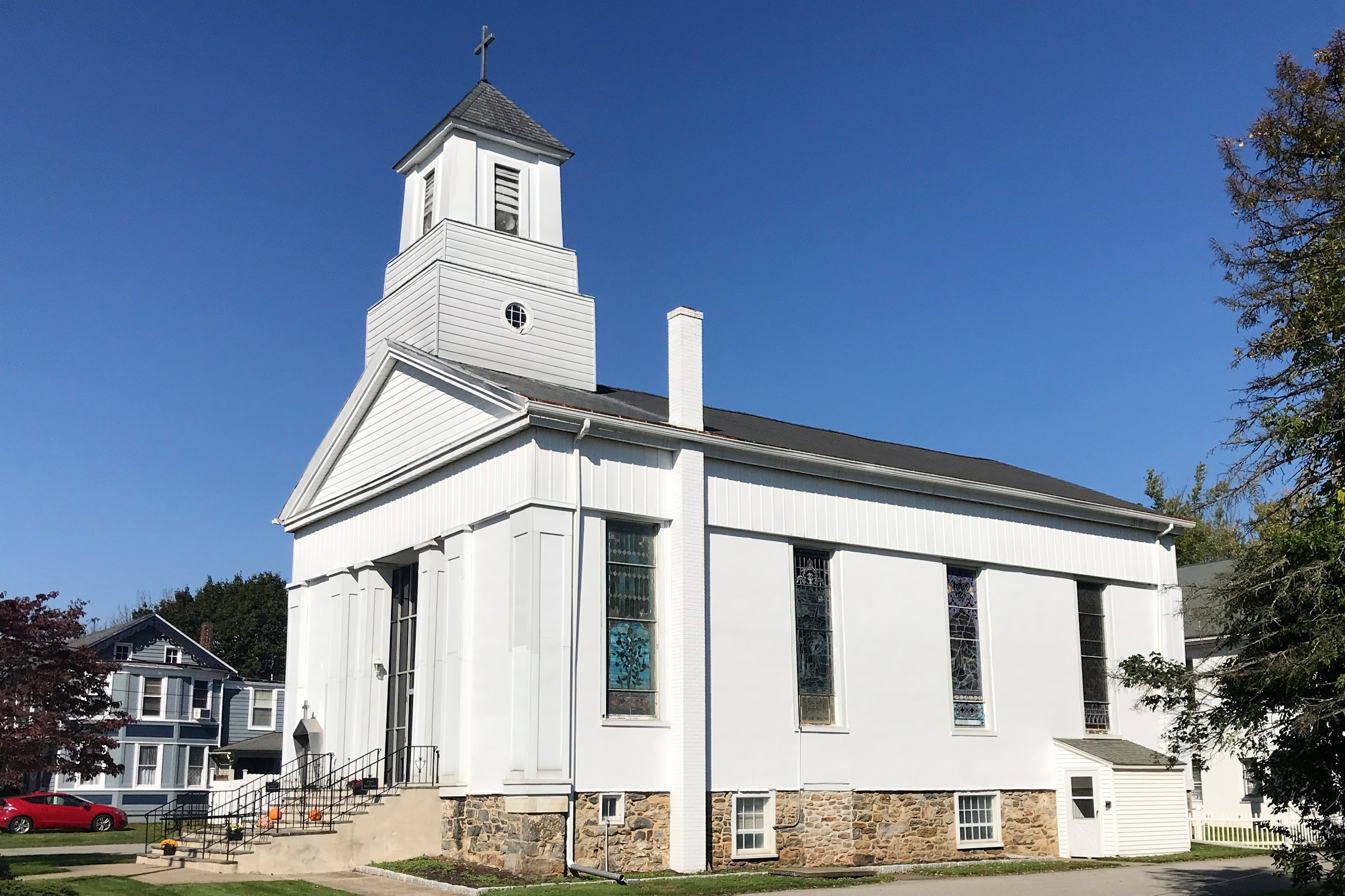
First Lutheran

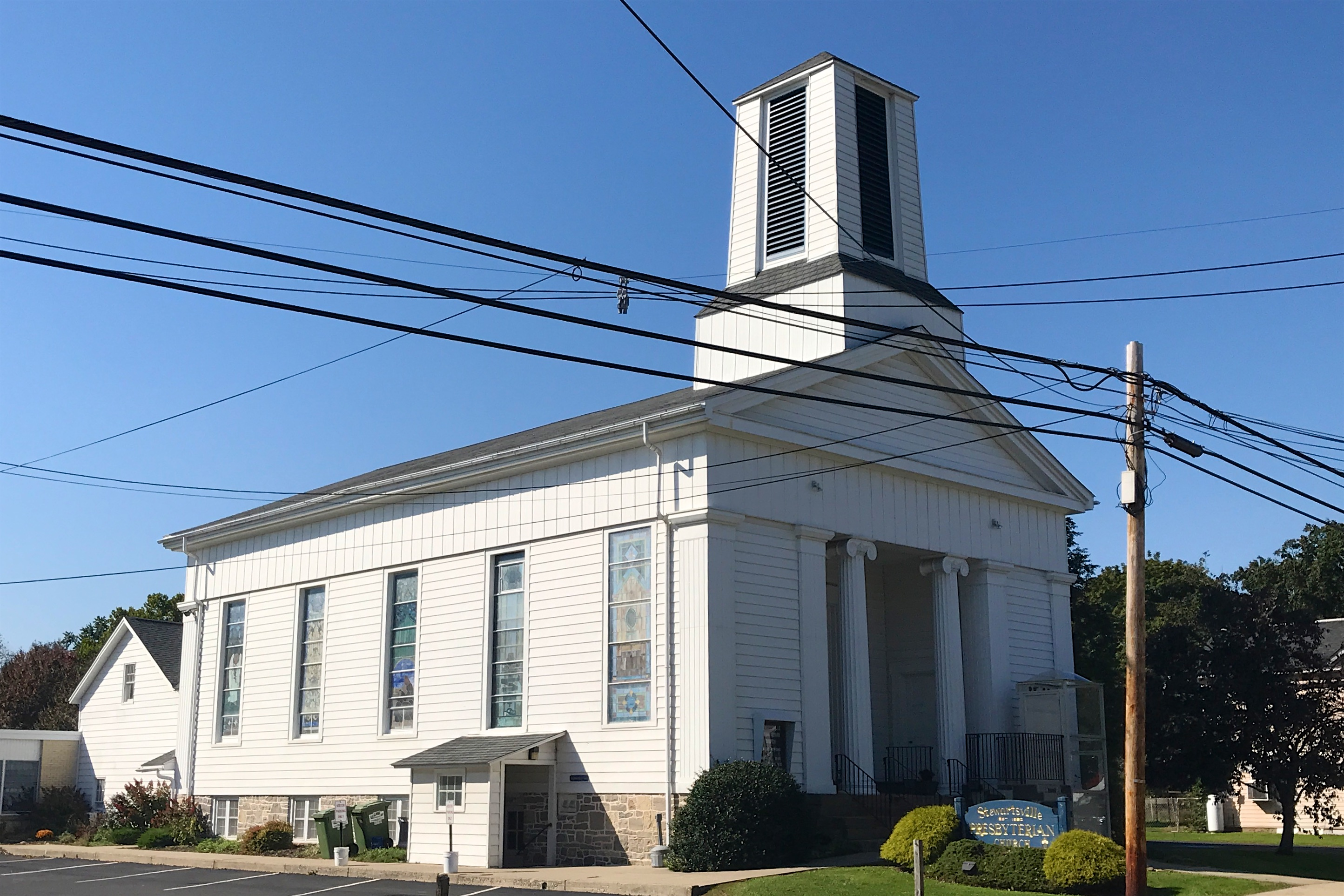
Stewartsville Presbyterian

== Notable people ==
People who were born in, residents of, or otherwise closely associated with Stewartsville include:

- Orange Cassidy (born 1984), professional wrestler
- Justin Gaymon (born 1986), former 400 metre hurdler
