= Lander–Stewart Mansion and Stites Building =

- U.S. National Register of Historic Places
- U.S. Historic district – Contributing property
- New Jersey Register of Historic Places
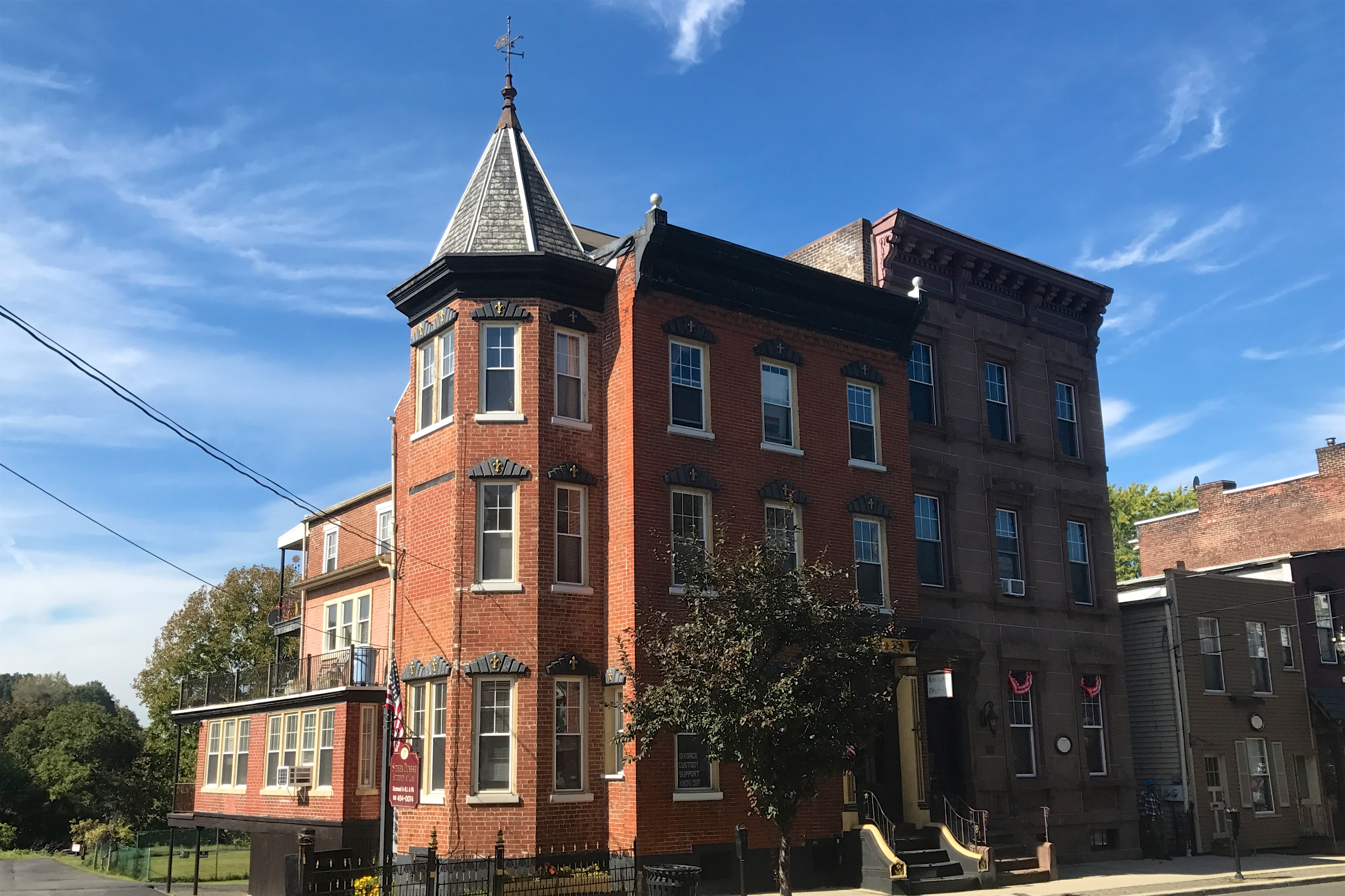
- Lander-Stewart Mansion and Stites Building, 2017

- Location within Warren County, New Jersey Location within New Jersey Location within the United States
- Location: 102–104 South Main Street; Phillipsburg, New Jersey
- Coordinates: 40°41′23″N 75°12′04″W
- Architectural style: Italianate, Neo-Grec
- Part of: Phillipsburg Commercial Historic District (ID08000973)
- NRHP reference No.: 08000561
- NJRHP No.: 4772

Significant dates
- Added to NRHP: June 25, 2008
- Designated CP: October 8, 2008
- Designated NJRHP: May 6, 2008

The Lander–Stewart Mansion and Stites Building are two historic houses in the town of Phillipsburg in Warren County, New Jersey, United States. The Lander–Stewart Mansion, built c. 1880, is at 102 South Main Street and the adjoining Stites–Lander Townhouse, built c. 1835, is at 104 South Main Street. They were added to the National Register of Historic Places on June 25, 2008, for their significance in architecture. They were listed as contributing properties of the Phillipsburg Commercial Historic District on October 8, 2008.

== History and description ==
Around 1835, William Stites and his wife Sarah lived in the three and one-half story brick townhouse at 104 South Main Street, the Stites Building. The Federal style building was later owned by John Lander (1798–1889), founder of the Warren Foundry & Machine Company, one of the town's largest employers. An octagonal tower was added around 1885 during a renovation, which added Italianate features. The three-story brick townhouse at 102 South Main Street, the Lander–Stewart Mansion, was built around 1880 by Jacob S. Stewart, son-in-law of Lander. It features a brownstone facade and Italianate/Neo-Grec architecture.

== Gallery ==
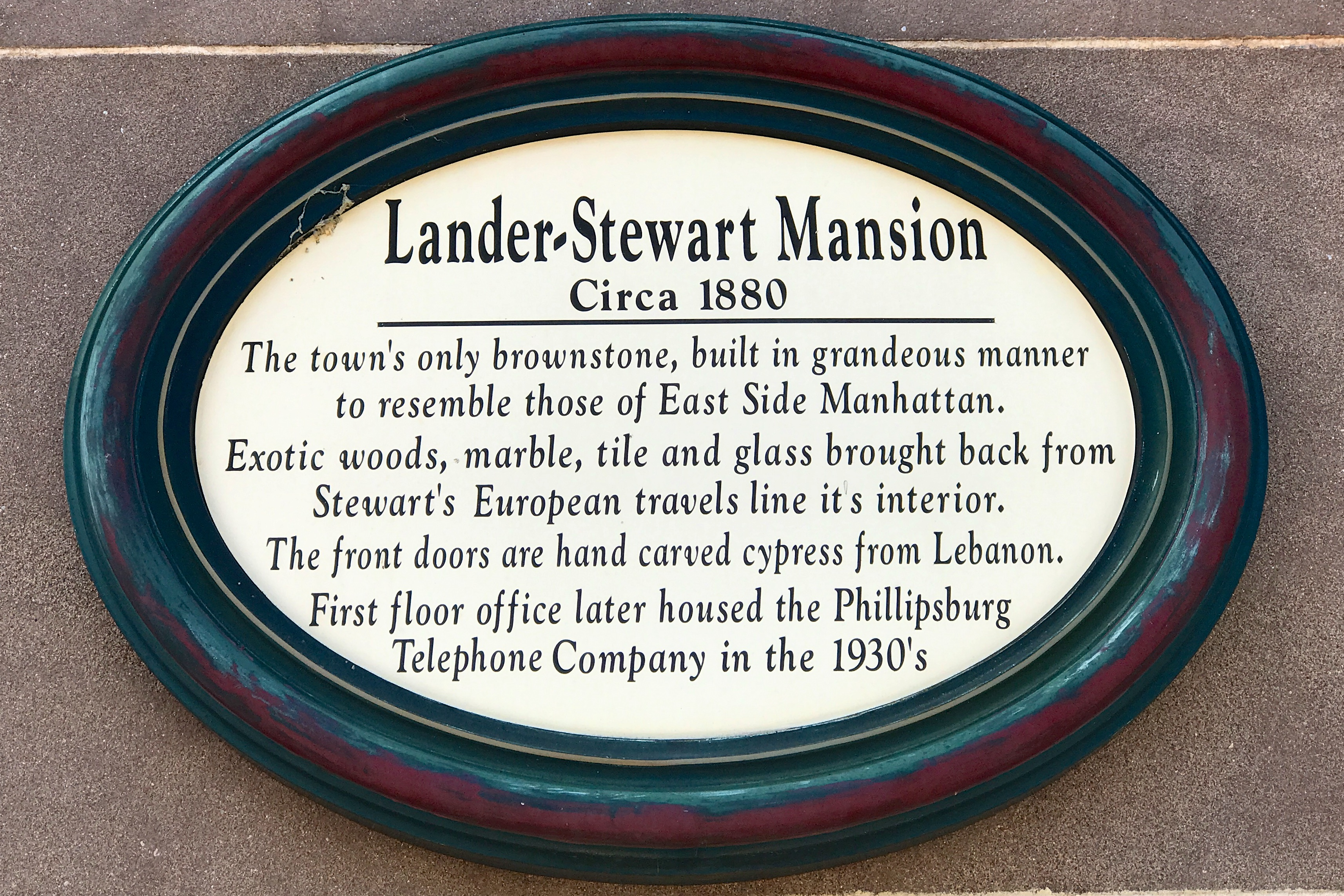
Lander–Stewart Mansion plaque

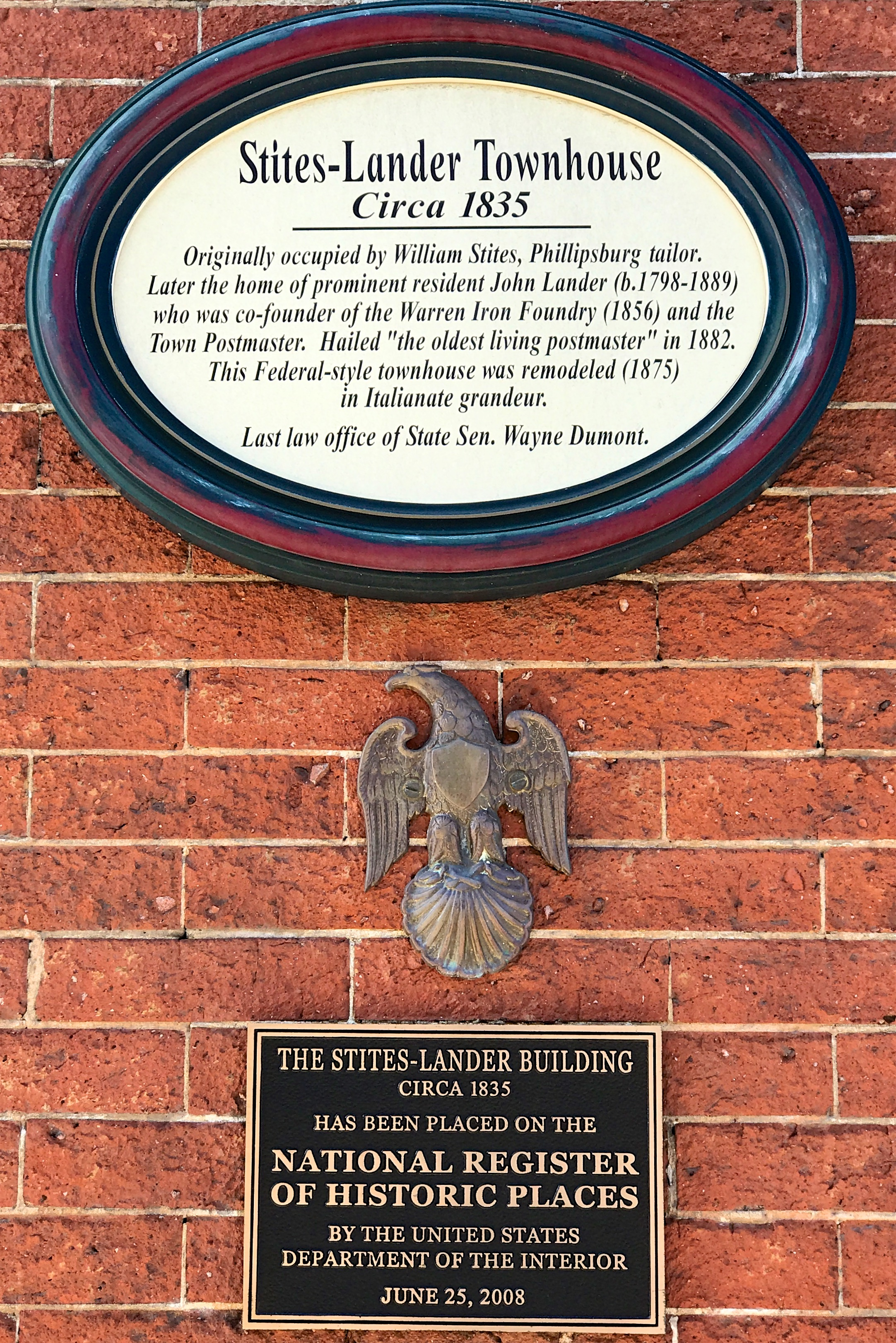
Stites Building plaque

== See also ==
- National Register of Historic Places listings in Warren County, New Jersey
