= Beattystown Historic District =

Historic district in New Jersey, United States

- U.S. National Register of Historic Places
- U.S. Historic district
- New Jersey Register of Historic Places
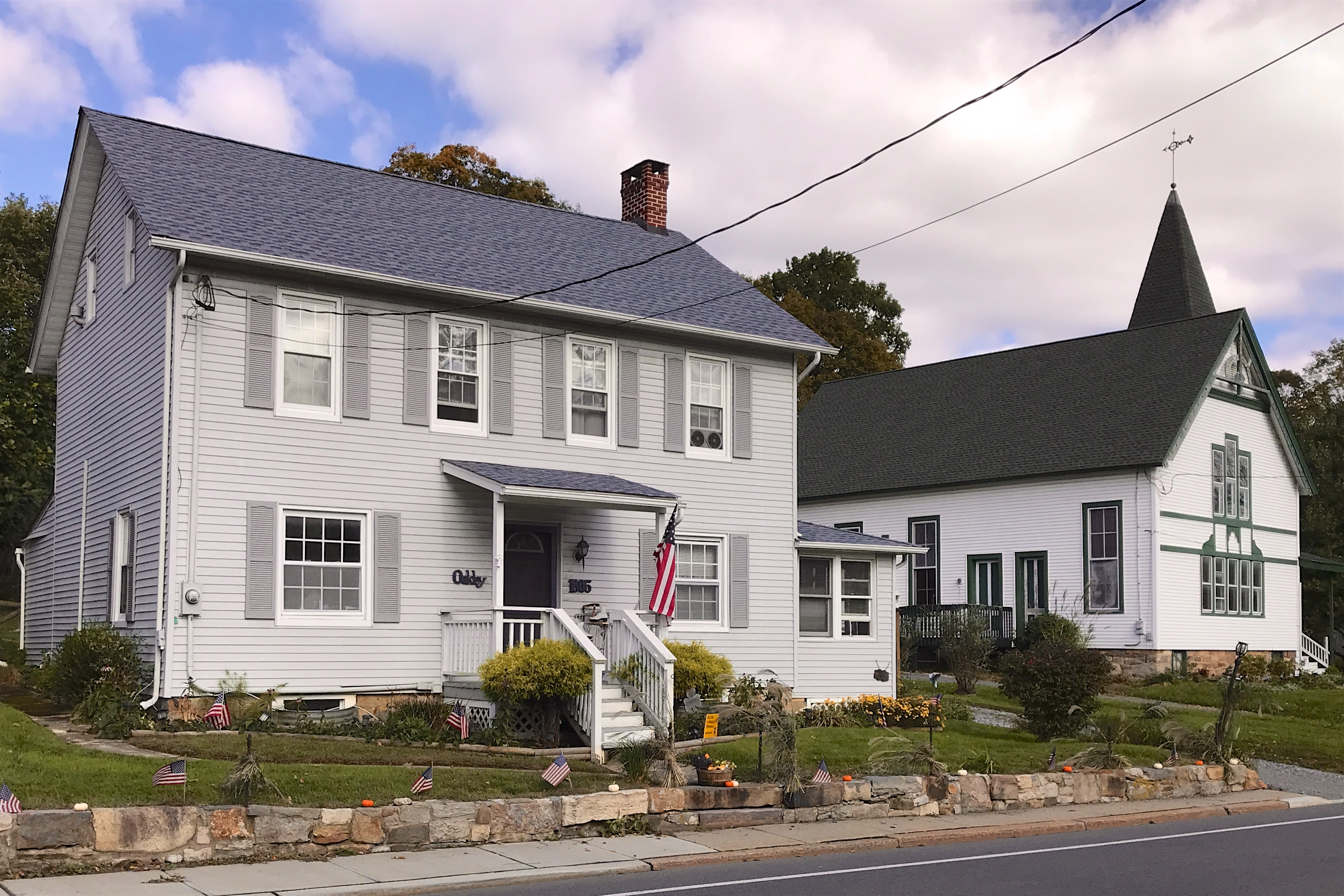

- Location within Warren County, New Jersey Location within New Jersey Location within the United States
- Location: Junction of New Jersey Route 57 and Kings Highway; Beattystown, New Jersey
- Coordinates: 40°48′49″N 74°50′34″W
- Area: 35 acres (14 ha)
- Architectural style: Greek Revival, Stick/eastlake
- NRHP reference No.: 90001449
- NJRHP No.: 2770

Significant dates
- Added to NRHP: September 28, 1990
- Designated NJRHP: August 10, 1990

The Beattystown Historic District is a 35-acre (14 ha) historic district in the village of Beattystown in Mansfield Township of Warren County, New Jersey, United States. The district was added to the National Register of Historic Places on September 28, 1990 for its significance in architecture, commerce, industry, and settlement pattern from 1762 to 1929. It includes 32 contributing buildings.

== History and description ==
Beattystown was founded around 1762 with the establishment of the George Beatty Mill along the Musconetcong River. The former Presbyterian Church, now Skylands Unitarian Universalist Fellowship, was built around 1882 and features Eastern Stick style. The Iron Ore Scale House was built in the 1880s for the Shield Iron Ore mines. The brick Johnson General Store was built around 1830. The four-story stone S.B. Fisher Grist Mill, also known as the Beattystown Mill, was built around 1800–1810.

== Gallery of contributing properties ==
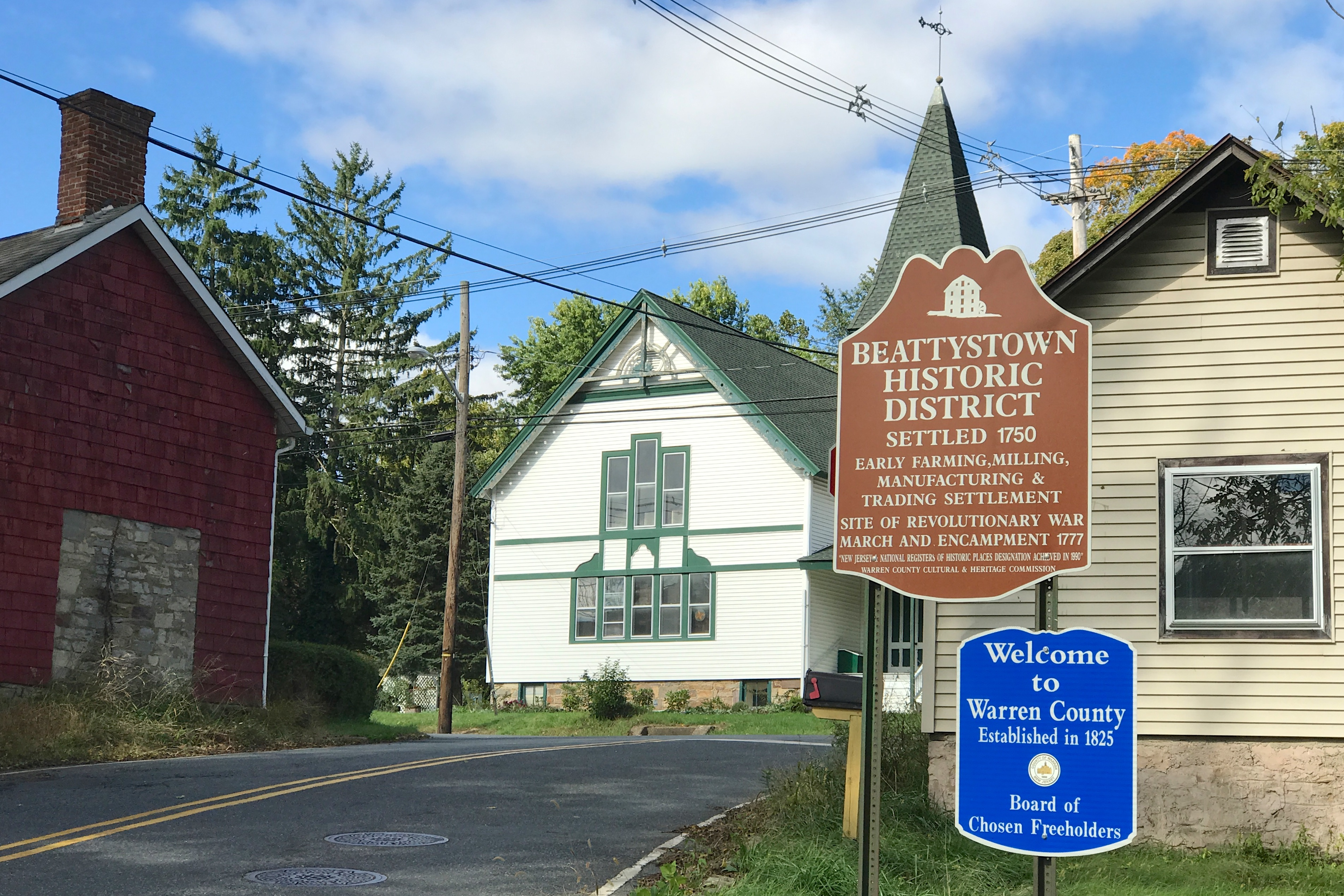
Welcome to Beattystown Historic District

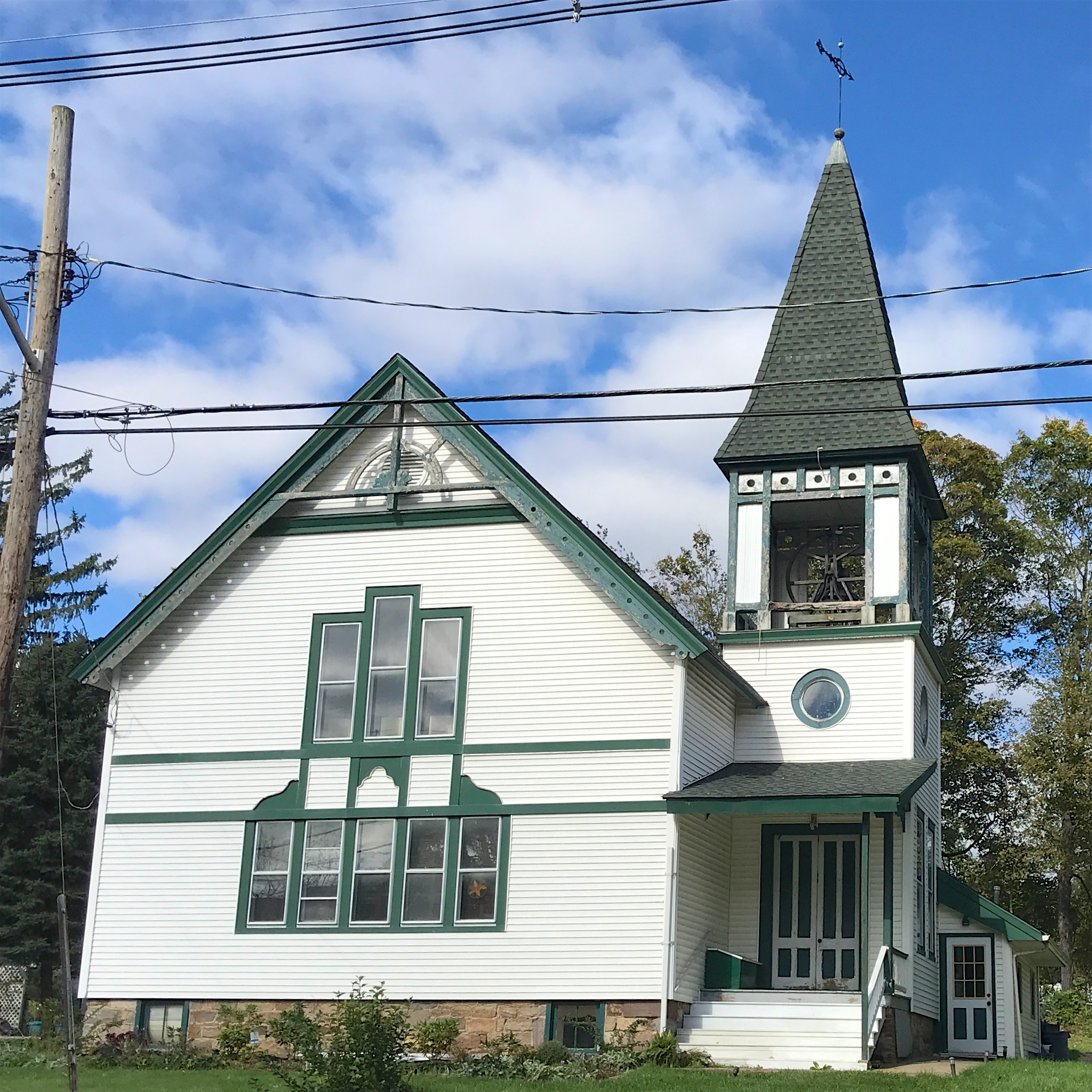
Former Presbyterian Church

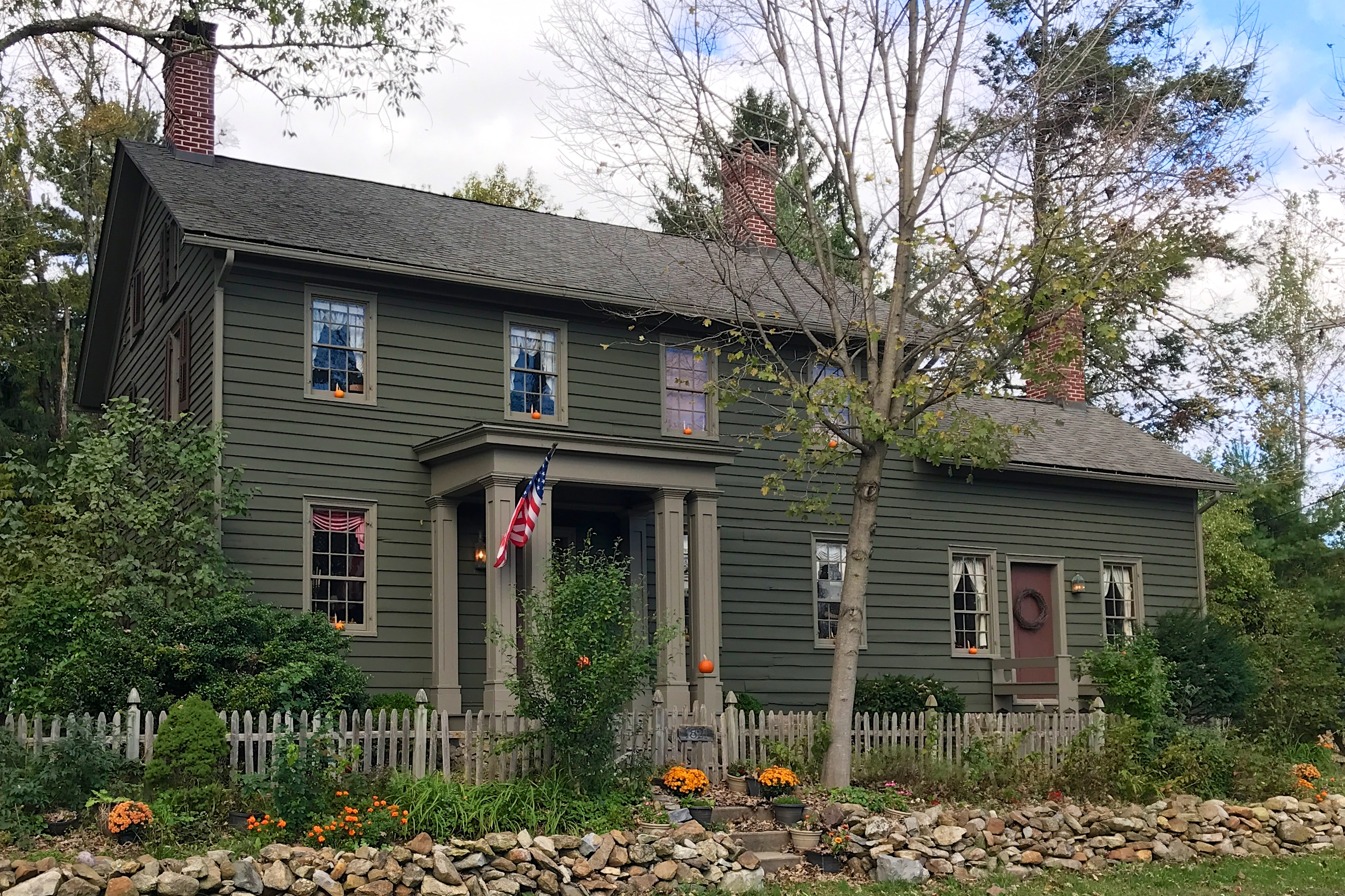
Vernacular style frame house
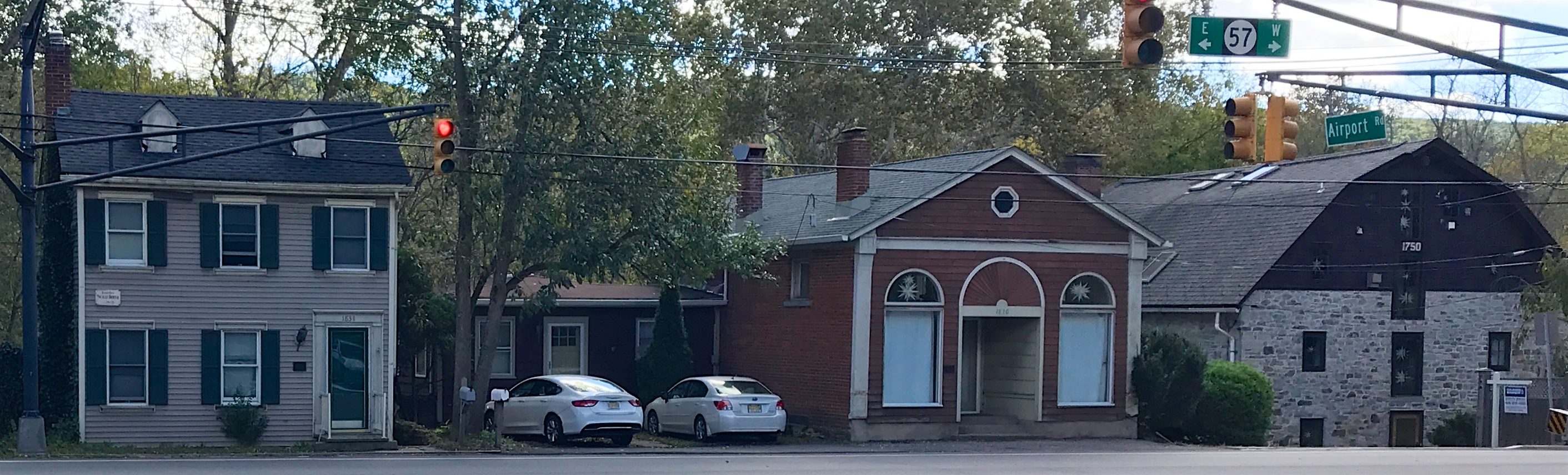
Iron Ore Scale House, Johnson General Store, and S.B. Fisher Grist Mill
