= Beattystown, New Jersey =

Populated place in Warren County, New Jersey, US

- Census-designated place
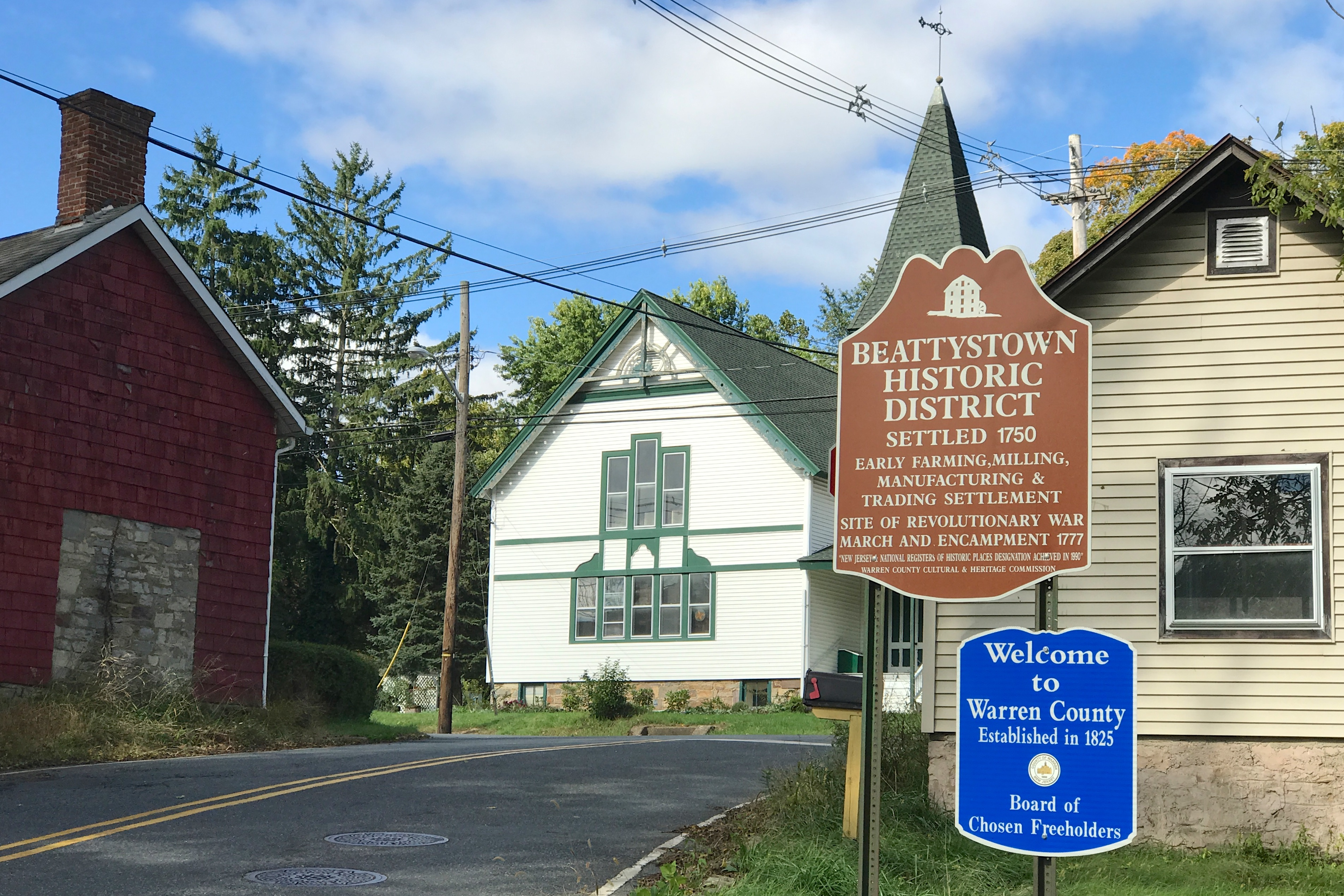
- Signage at the edge of the Beattystown Historic District

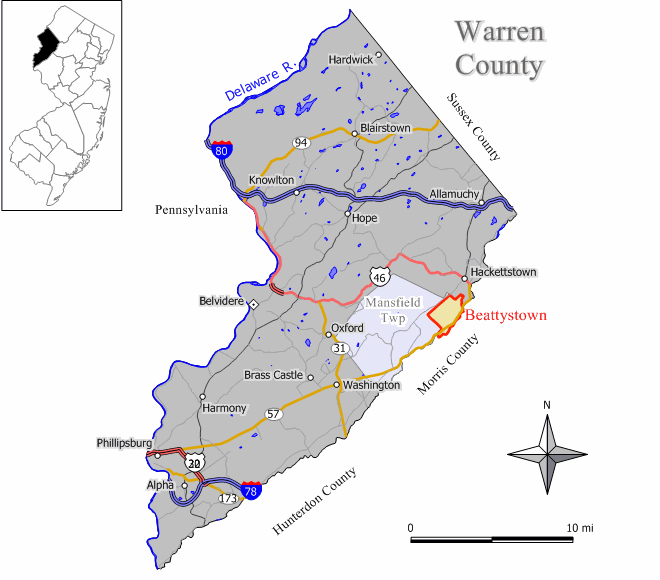
- Map of Beattystown CDP in Warren County

- Location in Warren County Location in New Jersey Location in the United States
- Coordinates: 40.819412°N 74.853676°W
- Country: United States
- State: New Jersey
- County: Warren
- Township: Mansfield
- Named after: George Beatty

Area
  - Total: 3.05 sq mi (7.90 km^{2})
  - Land: 3.03 sq mi (7.84 km^{2})
  - Water: 0.023 sq mi (0.06 km^{2}) 0.81%
- Elevation: 640 ft (195 m)

Population (2020)
  - Total: 4,701
  - Density: 1,552.9/sq mi (599.56/km^{2})
- Time zone: UTC−05:00 (Eastern (EST))
  - Summer (DST): UTC−04:00 (EDT)
- ZIP Code: 07201
- Area code: 908
- FIPS code: 34-04252
- GNIS feature ID: 02389184

Beattystown is an unincorporated community and census-designated place (CDP) located within Mansfield Township, in Warren, in the U.S. state of New Jersey. As of the 2020 census, Beattystown had a population of 4,701.

Beattystown has been listed as one of the 10 most endangered historic sites in New Jersey by Preservation New Jersey.

Beattystown was named after George Beatty, who built a mill here c. 1762.

== Geography ==
According to the United States Census Bureau, Beattystown had a total area of 3.036 square miles (7.86 km^{2}), including 3.011 square miles (7.80 km^{2}) of land and 0.025 square miles (0.065 km^{2}) of water (0.81%).

== Demographics ==
Historical population
Census	Pop.	Note	%±
1990	3,966		—
2000	3,223		−18.7%
2010	4,554		41.3%
2020	4,701		3.2%
Population sources: 1990-2010 2000; 2010 2020

Incorrectly listed as Beatyestown in the 2000 U.S. census.

=== Racial and ethnic composition ===
Beattystown CDP, New Jersey – Racial and ethnic composition Note: the US Census treats Hispanic/Latino as an ethnic category. This table excludes Latinos from the racial categories and assigns them to a separate category. Hispanics/Latinos may be of any race.
Race / Ethnicity (NH = Non-Hispanic)	Pop 2000	Pop 2010	Pop 2020	% 2000	% 2010	% 2020
White alone (NH)	2,826	3,376	3,114	87.68%	74.13%	66.24%
Black or African American alone (NH)	53	207	303	1.64%	4.55%	6.45%
Native American or Alaska Native alone (NH)	1	5	7	0.03%	0.11%	0.15%
Asian alone (NH)	60	218	198	1.86%	4.79%	4.21%
Native Hawaiian or Pacific Islander alone (NH)	0	0	0	0.00%	0.00%	0.00%
Other race alone (NH)	14	10	19	0.43%	0.22%	0.40%
Mixed race or Multiracial (NH)	59	69	163	1.83%	1.52%	3.47%
Hispanic or Latino (any race)	210	669	897	6.52%	14.69%	19.08%
Total	3,223	4,554	4,701	100.00%	100.00%	100.00%

=== 2020 census ===
As of the 2020 census, Beattystown had a population of 4,701. The median age was 40.8 years. 20.3% of residents were under the age of 18 and 14.1% of residents were 65 years of age or older. For every 100 females there were 95.1 males, and for every 100 females age 18 and over there were 92.3 males age 18 and over.

90.5% of residents lived in urban areas, while 9.5% lived in rural areas.

There were 2,013 households in Beattystown, of which 28.0% had children under the age of 18 living in them. Of all households, 42.8% were married-couple households, 21.1% were households with a male householder and no spouse or partner present, and 28.9% were households with a female householder and no spouse or partner present. About 34.3% of all households were made up of individuals and 11.9% had someone living alone who was 65 years of age or older.

There were 2,113 housing units, of which 4.7% were vacant. The homeowner vacancy rate was 0.6% and the rental vacancy rate was 5.9%.

=== 2010 census ===
The 2010 United States census counted 4,554 people, 1,848 households, and 1,159 families in the CDP. The population density was 1,512.3 people per square mile (583.9 people/km^{2}). There were 2,091 housing units at an average density of 694.4 units per square mile (268.1 units/km^{2}). The racial makeup was 84.12% (3,831) White, 4.94% (225) Black or African American, 0.13% (6) Native American, 4.79% (218) Asian, 0.02% (1) Pacific Islander, 3.82% (174) from other races, and 2.17% (99) from two or more races. Hispanic or Latino of any race were 14.69% (669) of the population.

Of the 1,848 households, 32.9% had children under the age of 18; 45.1% were married couples living together; 13.0% had a female householder with no husband present and 37.3% were non-families. Of all households, 29.0% were made up of individuals and 7.8% had someone living alone who was 65 years of age or older. The average household size was 2.46 and the average family size was 3.09.

24.4% of the population were under the age of 18, 9.2% from 18 to 24, 30.5% from 25 to 44, 26.7% from 45 to 64, and 9.2% who were 65 years of age or older. The median age was 37.1 years. For every 100 females, the population had 93.6 males. For every 100 females ages 18 and older there were 92.2 males.

=== 2000 census ===
As of the 2000 United States census there were 3,223 people, 1,218 households, and 862 families residing in the CDP. The population density was 413.4 people/km^{2} (1,071 people/mi^{2}). There were 1,253 housing units at an average density of 160.7 units/km^{2} (416 units/mi^{2}). The racial makeup of the CDP was 91.75% White, 1.64% African American, 0.03% Native American, 1.86% Asian, 2.64% from other races, and 2.08% from two or more races. Hispanic or Latino of any race were 6.52% of the population.

There were 1,218 households, out of which 39.5% had children under the age of 18 living with them, 56.3% were married couples living together, 10.3% had a female householder with no husband present, and 29.2% were non-families. 22.6% of all households were made up of individuals, and 6.2% had someone living alone who was 65 years of age or older. The average household size was 2.65 and the average family size was 3.16.

In the CDP the population was spread out, with 28.4% under the age of 18, 6.1% from 18 to 24, 36.9% from 25 to 44, 21.1% from 45 to 64, and 7.5% who were 65 years of age or older. The median age was 35 years. For every 100 females, there were 96.3 males. For every 100 females age 18 and over, there were 90.5 males.

The median income for a household in the CDP was $56,507, and the median income for a family was $75,196. Males had a median income of $48,843 versus $38,173 for females. The per capita income for the CDP was $29,345. About 2.0% of families and 2.3% of the population were below the poverty line, including 1.1% of those under age 18 and none of those age 65 or over.

== Points of interest ==
The Beattystown Historic District was added to the National Register of Historic Places on September 28, 1990, for its significance in architecture, commerce, industry, and settlement pattern.
