= Kennedy House and Mill =

Coordinates: 40°39′39″N 75°6′48″W

- U.S. National Register of Historic Places
- New Jersey Register of Historic Places
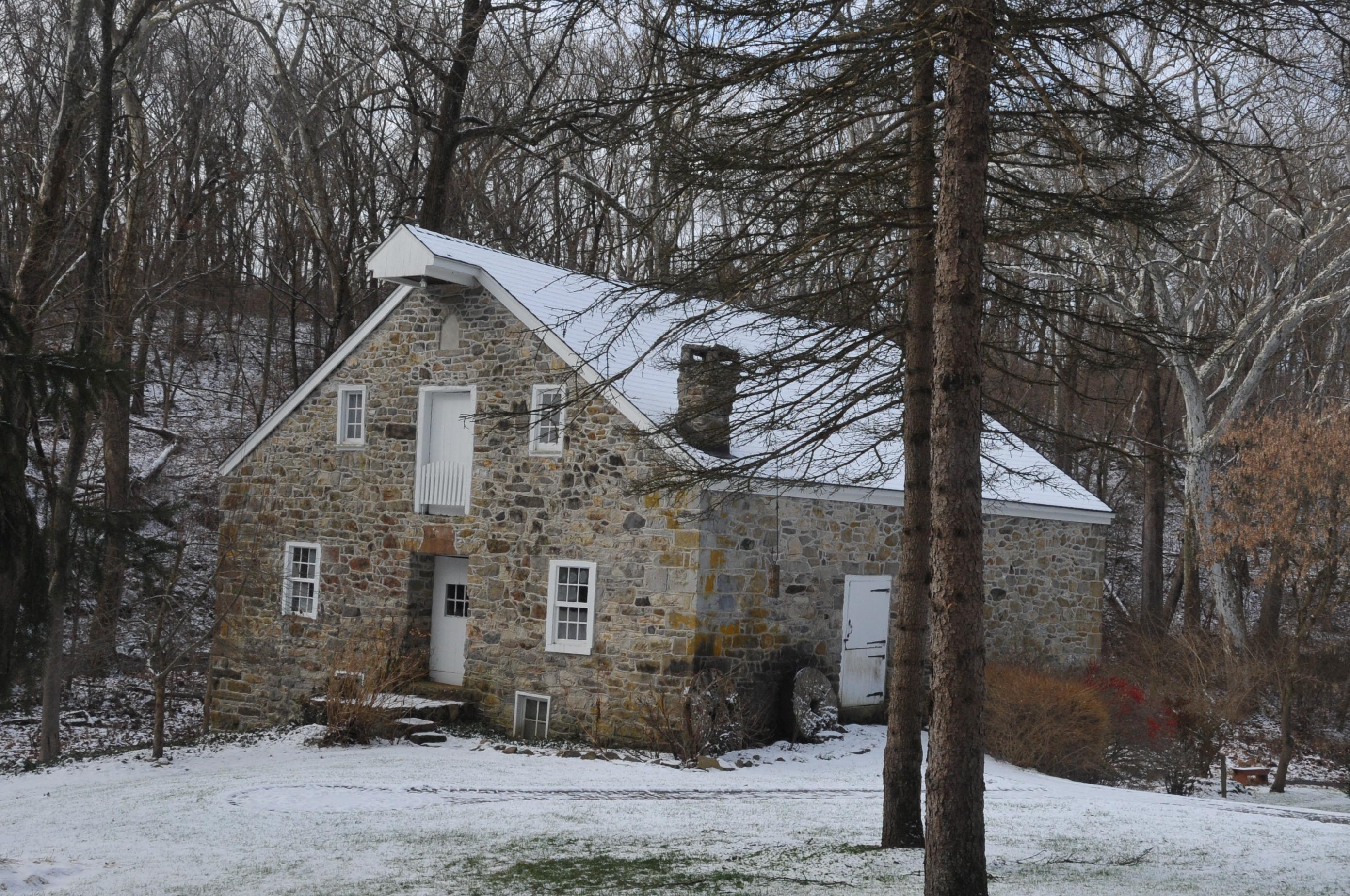
- Kennedy Mill
- Location: 306 NJ 173, Kennedy Mills, New Jersey
- Nearest city: Stewartsville, New Jersey
- Area: 7.8 acres (3.2 ha)
- Architectural style: Federal
- NRHP reference No.: 96000552
- NJRHP No.: 3494

Significant dates
- Added to NRHP: May 16, 1996
- Designated NJRHP: March 25, 1996

The Kennedy House and Mill are historic buildings located at 306 NJ 173 near Pohatcong Creek in Greenwich Township, Warren County, New Jersey. They were added to the National Register of Historic Places on May 16, 1996 for their significance in architecture, politics/government and industry. The area of Stewartsville, New Jersey is also called Kennedy Mills.

The two-story Kennedy House was built c. 1815–1825 of coursed rubble stone construction in a Federal architecture style. The two and one-half story gristmill, located along the Pohatcong Creek, is also of rubble stone construction.

== History ==
By 1786, Robert Kennedy (1733–1812) owned the property, partly through the inheritance of his wife Elizabeth from her father William Henry (1716–1756). The mill may have been operating as early as 1764. Kennedy served as a wagonmaster in the American Revolutionary War. He is buried in the nearby Greenwich Presbyterian Church Cemetery. After his death, most of the property was inherited by his son Robert Henry Kennedy (1787–1859). After his death, the property passed to his son Henry Robert Kennedy (1815–1884).

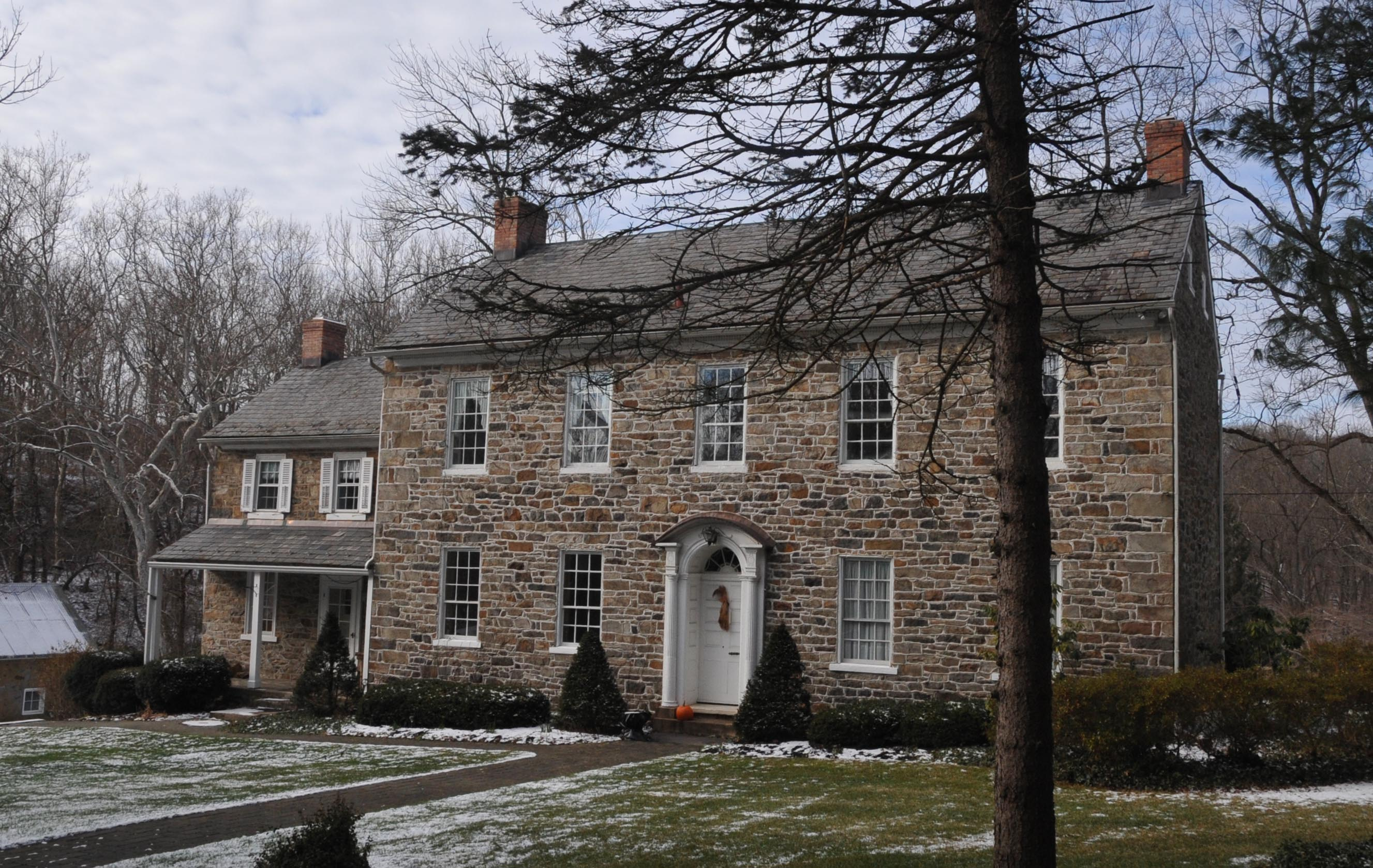
Kennedy House
