= Perry–Petty Farmstead =

- U.S. National Register of Historic Places
- New Jersey Register of Historic Places
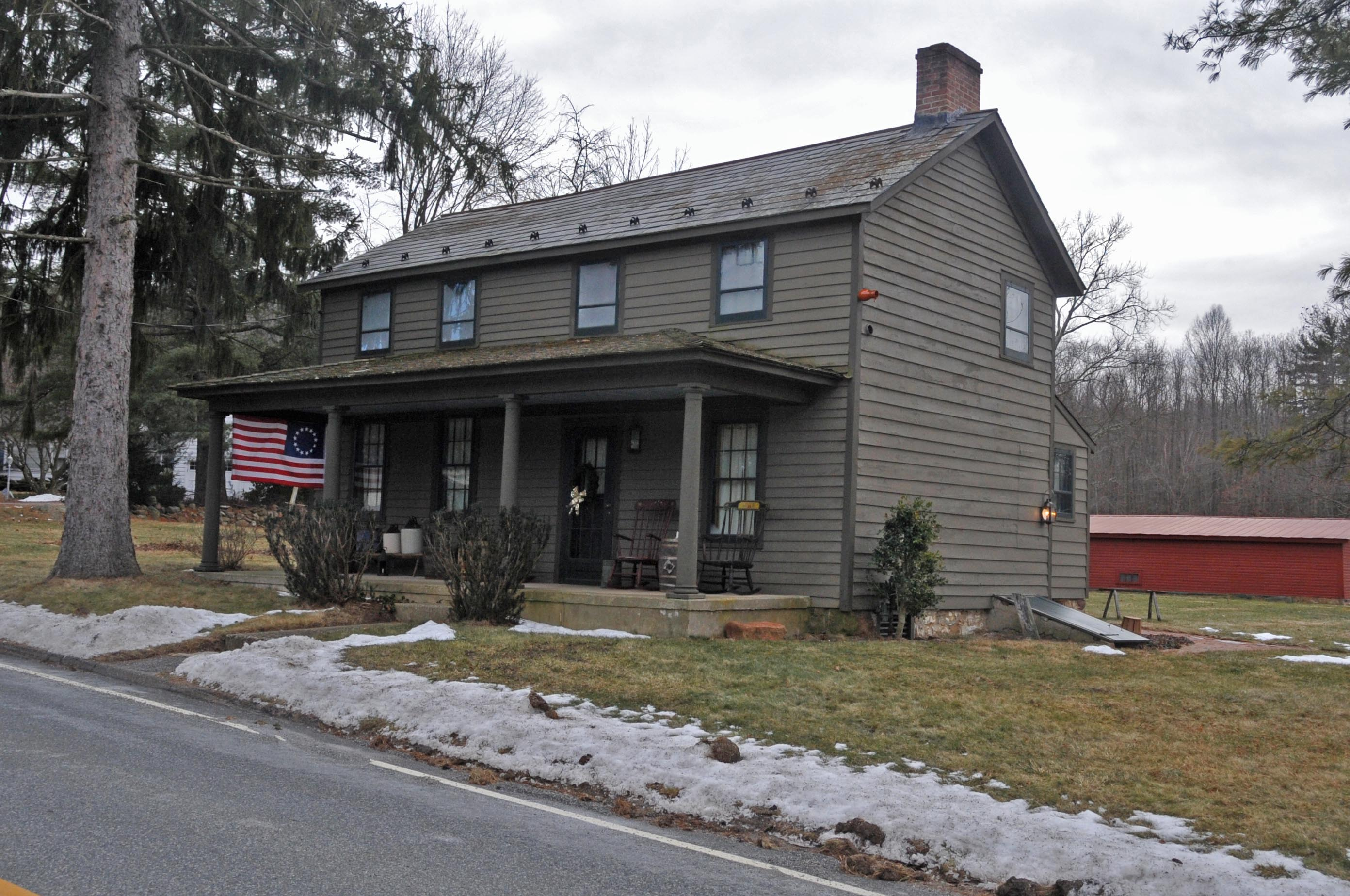

- Location within Warren County, New Jersey Location within New Jersey Location within the United States
- Location: 882 Jackson Valley Road, Mansfield Township, Warren County, New Jersey
- Coordinates: 40°48′8.6″N 74°56′20.4″W
- Area: 6.6 acres (2.7 ha)
- Architectural style: Mid 19th Century Revival
- NRHP reference No.: 99000392
- NJRHP No.: 181

Significant dates
- Added to NRHP: April 9, 1999
- Designated NJRHP: February 4, 1999

The Perry–Petty Farmstead is located in the valley of the Pohatcong Creek at 882 Jackson Valley Road in Mansfield Township of Warren County, New Jersey, United States. The historic 19th century farmhouse was added to the National Register of Historic Places on April 9, 1999, for its significance in agriculture and architecture.

In 1813, Jonathan Petty purchased a tract of land here. It remained in the Petty family as a wood lot until the 1841. In the 1850 census, George Winters, a canal boatman, was living here. According to the nomination form, he may have built the house. In 1853, he sold it to William G. Perry. Ann E. Perry bought the property in 1862 and sold it in 1864. George W. Taylor acquired it as a rental property and Joseph Petty was living here in 1870. Jacob Petty purchased it in 1872. His son, George Petty, purchased it in 1876 and lived here until his death in 1924.
