= Oxford Industrial Historic District =

Historic district in New Jersey, United States

- U.S. National Register of Historic Places
- U.S. Historic district
- New Jersey Register of Historic Places
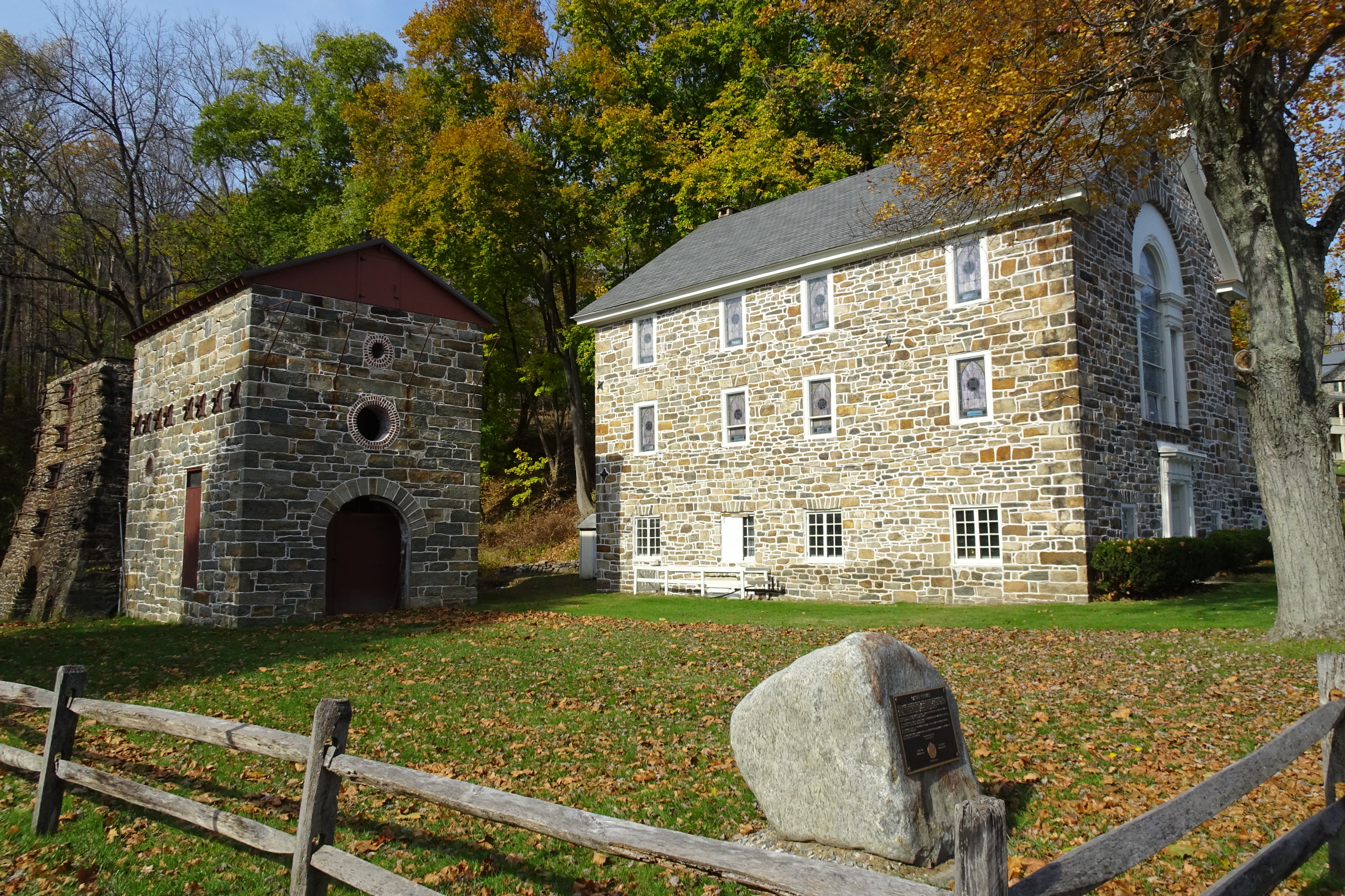
- Oxford Furnace and the Oxford Colonial United Methodist Church

- Location within Warren County, New Jersey Location within New Jersey Location within the United States
- Location: NJ Route 31; Belvidere, Buckley, and Washington avenues; Jonestown and Mine Hill roads; Academy and Church streets, and vicinity Oxford Township, New Jersey
- Coordinates: 40°47′55″N 74°59′42″W
- Area: 1,200 acres (490 ha)
- Architectural style: Victorian
- NRHP reference No.: 91001471
- NJRHP No.: 2774

Significant dates
- Added to NRHP: August 27, 1992
- Designated NJRHP: August 16, 1991

The Oxford Industrial Historic District is a 1,200-acre (490 ha) historic district primarily located in Oxford Township in Warren County, New Jersey. It also extends into Mansfield Township and Washington Township. The district was added to the National Register of Historic Places on August 27, 1992, for its significance in community development, industry, and transportation from 1741 to 1930. It has 385 contributing buildings, including the individually listed Oxford Furnace and Shippen Manor, three contributing structures, and six contributing sites.

== History and description ==
Oxford Furnace was started in 1741 by Joseph Shippen Jr. and Jonathan Robeson. The ironmaster's house, Shippen Manor, was built by Shippen and his brother William Shippen Sr. and features Georgian architecture. The Oxford Methodist Church was built in 1813 with Colonial Revival architecture.

== Gallery of contributing properties ==
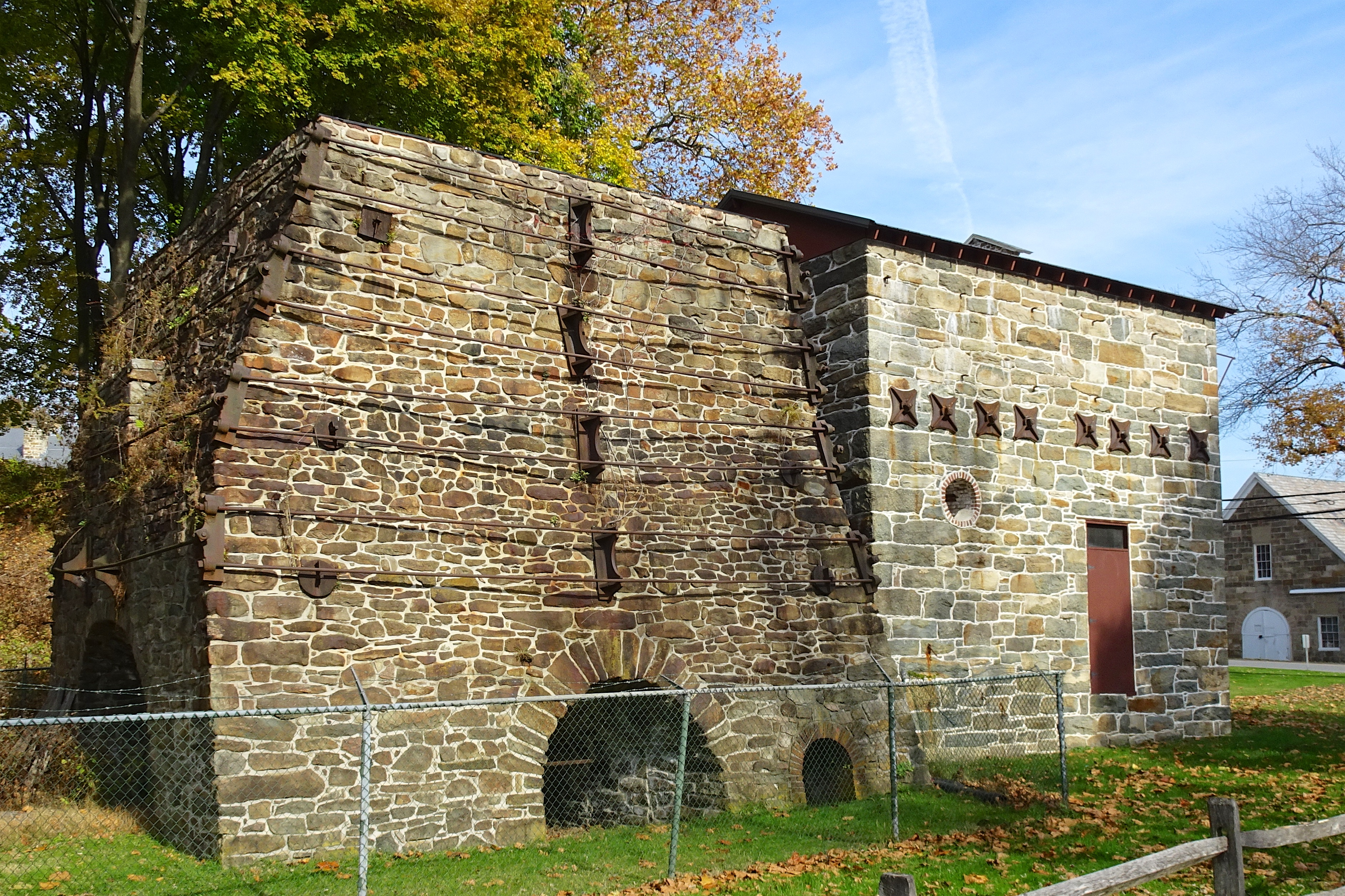
Oxford Furnace and blowing house

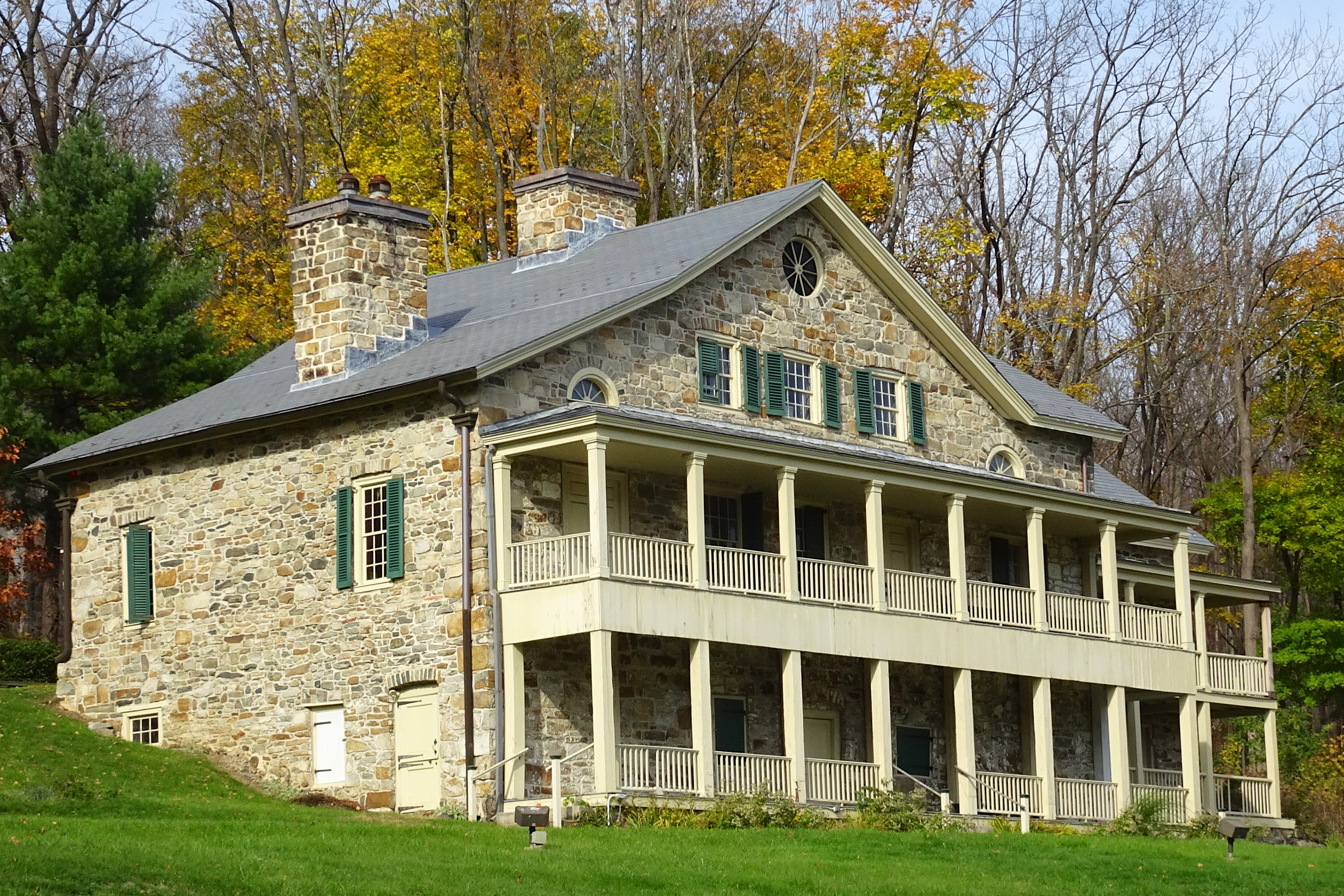
Shippen Manor

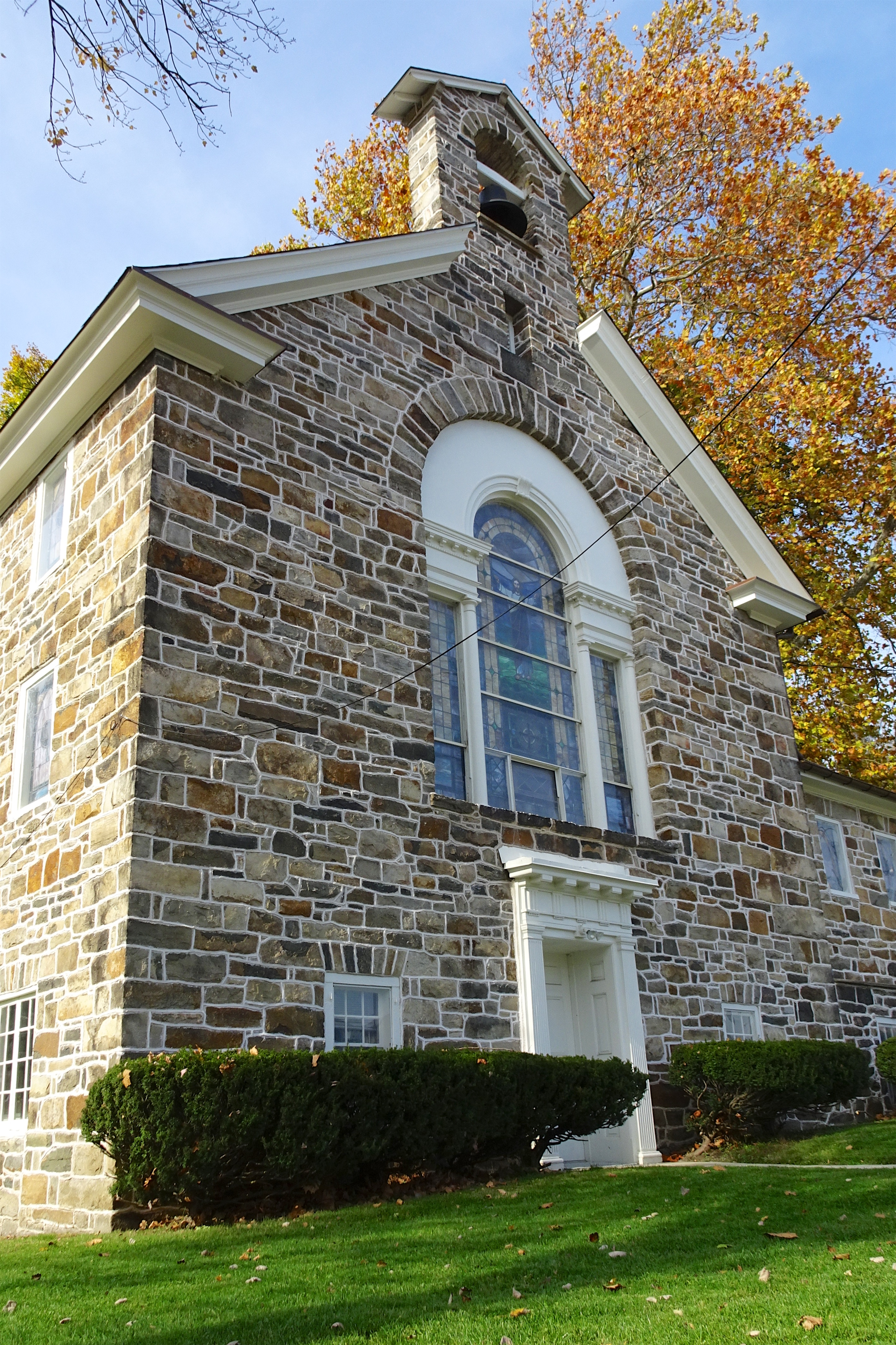
Oxford Methodist Church

== See also ==
- National Register of Historic Places listings in Warren County, New Jersey
