= Oxford (CDP), New Jersey =

Populated place in Warren County, New Jersey, US

Oxford, New Jersey
- Census-designated place
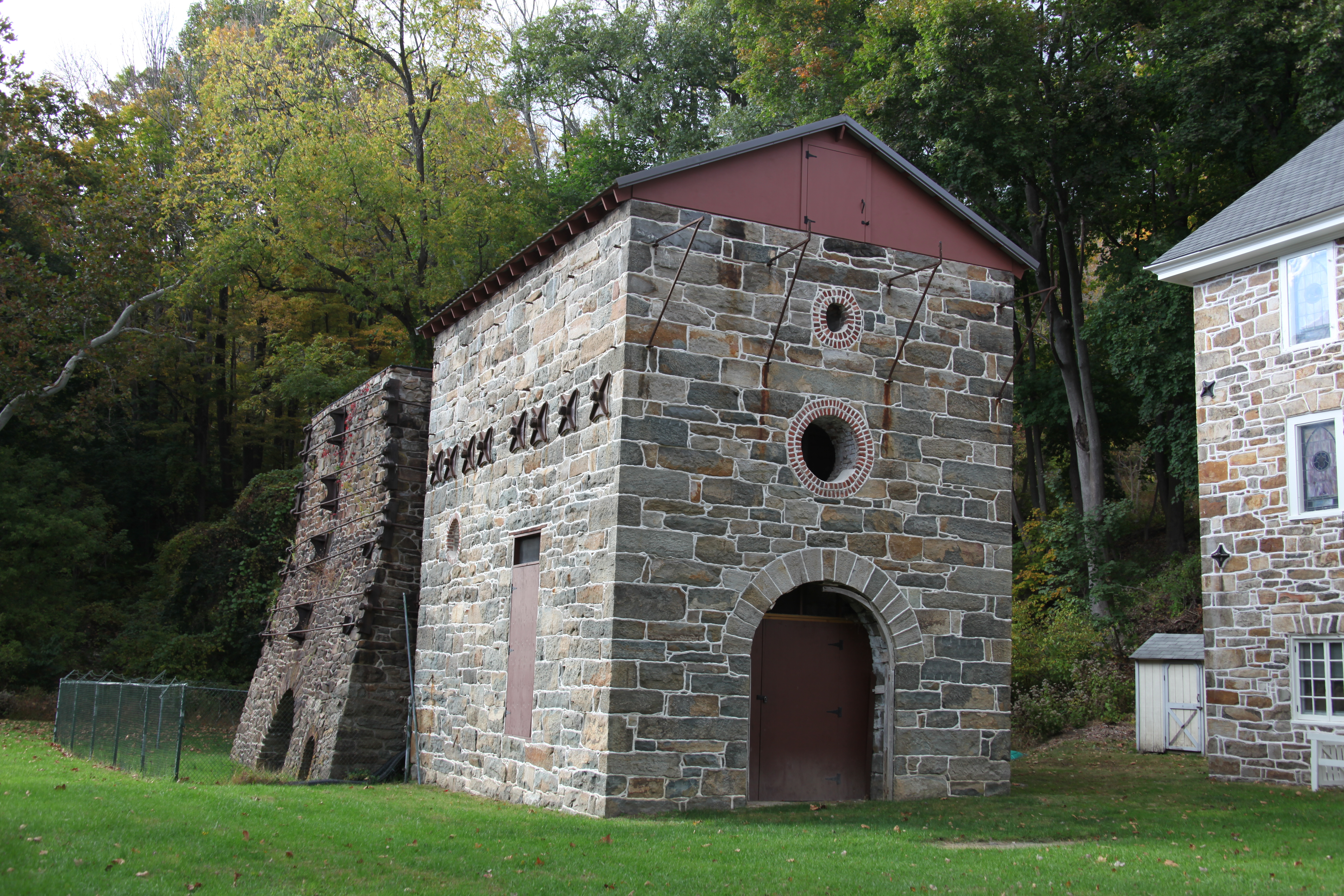
- Oxford Furnace

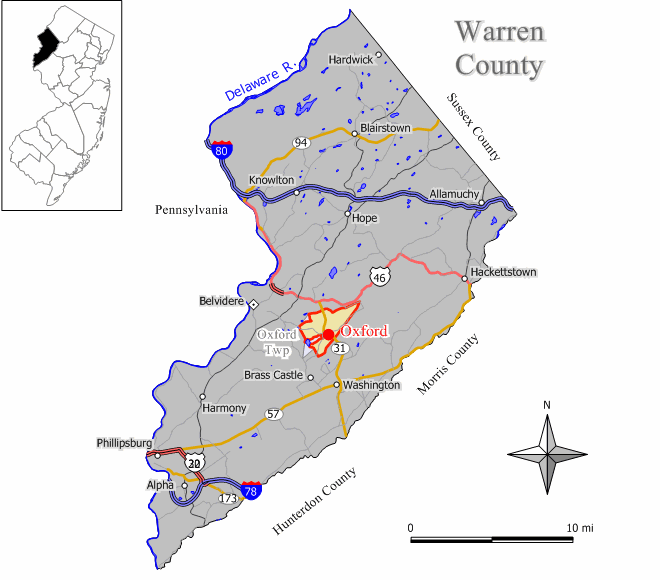
- Location of Oxford CDP in Warren County highlighted in yellow (right). Inset map: Location of Warren County in New Jersey highlighted in black (left).

- Location in Warren County Location in New Jersey Location in the United States
- Coordinates: 40.806004°N 75.001467°W
- Country: United States
- State: New Jersey
- County: Warren
- Township: Oxford

Area
  - Total: 0.69 sq mi (1.80 km^{2})
  - Land: 0.69 sq mi (1.79 km^{2})
  - Water: 0.0039 sq mi (0.01 km^{2}) 0.76%
- Elevation: 505 ft (154 m)

Population (2020)
  - Total: 1,033
  - Density: 1,497.4/sq mi (578.16/km^{2})
- Time zone: UTC−05:00 (Eastern (EST))
  - Summer (DST): UTC−04:00 (EDT)
- ZIP Code: 07863
- Area code: 908
- FIPS code: 34-55500
- GNIS feature ID: 02389632

Oxford is an unincorporated community and census-designated place (CDP) located within Oxford Township in Warren County, New Jersey, United States, that was created as part of the 2010 United States census. As of the 2010 Census, the CDP's population was 1,090.

== Geography ==
According to the United States Census Bureau, the CDP had a total area of 0.694 square miles (1.80 km^{2}), including 0.689 square miles (1.78 km^{2}) of land and 0.005 square miles (0.013 km^{2}) of water (0.76%).

== Demographics ==
Historical population
Census	Pop.	Note	%±
1950	1,041		—
1970	1,411		—
1980	1,587		12.5%
1990	1,767		11.3%
2000	2,283		29.2%
2010	1,090		−52.3%
2020	1,033		−5.2%
Population Sources: 1950 1960 1970; 1980 1990 2000; 2010 2020

Oxford appeared as an unincorporated community in the 1950 U.S. census. It was not listed in the 1960 U.S. census. It was again listed as an unincorporated community in the 1970 U.S. census under the name Oxford Center. It was then listed as a census designated place in the 1980 U.S. census.

=== 2020 census ===
Oxford CDP, New Jersey – Racial and ethnic composition Note: the US Census treats Hispanic/Latino as an ethnic category. This table excludes Latinos from the racial categories and assigns them to a separate category. Hispanics/Latinos may be of any race.
Race / Ethnicity (NH = Non-Hispanic)	Pop 2000	Pop 2010	Pop 2020	% 2000	% 2010	% 2020
White alone (NH)	2,152	1,042	883	94.26%	95.60%	85.48%
Black or African American alone (NH)	27	2	11	1.18%	0.18%	1.06%
Native American or Alaska Native alone (NH)	2	0	0	0.09%	0.00%	0.00%
Asian alone (NH)	12	8	7	0.53%	0.73%	0.68%
Native Hawaiian or Pacific Islander alone (NH)	0	0	0	0.00%	0.00%	0.00%
Other race alone (NH)	0	0	3	0.00%	0.00%	0.29%
Mixed race or Multiracial (NH)	10	9	58	0.44%	0.83%	5.61%
Hispanic or Latino (any race)	80	29	71	3.50%	2.66%	6.87%
Total	2,283	1,090	1,033	100.00%	100.00%	100.00%

=== 2010 census ===
The 2010 United States census counted 1,090 people, 455 households, and 287 families in the CDP. The population density was 1,581.8 people per square mile (610.7 people/km^{2}). There were 514 housing units at an average density of 745.9 units per square mile (288.0 units/km^{2}). The racial makeup was 97.61% (1,064) White, 0.18% (2) Black or African American, 0.00% (0) Native American, 0.73% (8) Asian, 0.00% (0) Pacific Islander, 0.37% (4) from other races, and 1.10% (12) from two or more races. Hispanic or Latino of any race were 2.66% (29) of the population.

Of the 455 households, 23.7% had children under the age of 18; 46.2% were married couples living together; 12.3% had a female householder with no husband present and 36.9% were non-families. Of all households, 30.3% were made up of individuals and 14.9% had someone living alone who was 65 years of age or older. The average household size was 2.38 and the average family size was 3.00.

20.1% of the population were under the age of 18, 7.9% from 18 to 24, 25.4% from 25 to 44, 28.8% from 45 to 64, and 17.8% who were 65 years of age or older. The median age was 43.5 years. For every 100 females, the population had 96.4 males. For every 100 females ages 18 and older there were 91.9 males.

=== 2000 census ===
As of the 2000 United States census there were 2,283 people, 878 households, and 611 families living in the CDP. The population density was 167.9 people/km^{2} (435 people/mi^{2}). There were 930 housing units at an average density of 68.4 units/km^{2} (177 units/mi^{2}). The racial makeup of the CDP was 96.54% White, 1.23% African American, 0.22% Native American, 0.53% Asian, 0.66% from other races, and 0.83% from two or more races. Hispanic or Latino of any race were 3.50% of the population.

There were 878 households, out of which 37.1% had children under the age of 18 living with them, 58.2% were married couples living together, 6.5% had a female householder with no husband present, and 30.4% were non-families. 26.4% of all households were made up of individuals, and 12.1% had someone living alone who was 65 years of age or older. The average household size was 2.60 and the average family size was 3.18.

In the CDP the population was spread out, with 27.5% under the age of 18, 4.9% from 18 to 24, 36.0% from 25 to 44, 20.3% from 45 to 64, and 11.3% who were 65 years of age or older. The median age was 36 years. For every 100 females, there were 97.3 males. For every 100 females age 18 and over, there were 95.2 males.

The median income for a household in the CDP was $53,281, and the median income for a family was $64,375. Males had a median income of $45,833 versus $31,210 for females. The per capita income for the CDP was $23,563. About 2.6% of families and 4.0% of the population were below the poverty line, including 2.1% of those under age 18 and 8.1% of those age 65 or over.

== Points of interest ==
- Oxford Furnace
- Shippen Manor
