= Saint-Gervais elm =

Tree in Paris, France

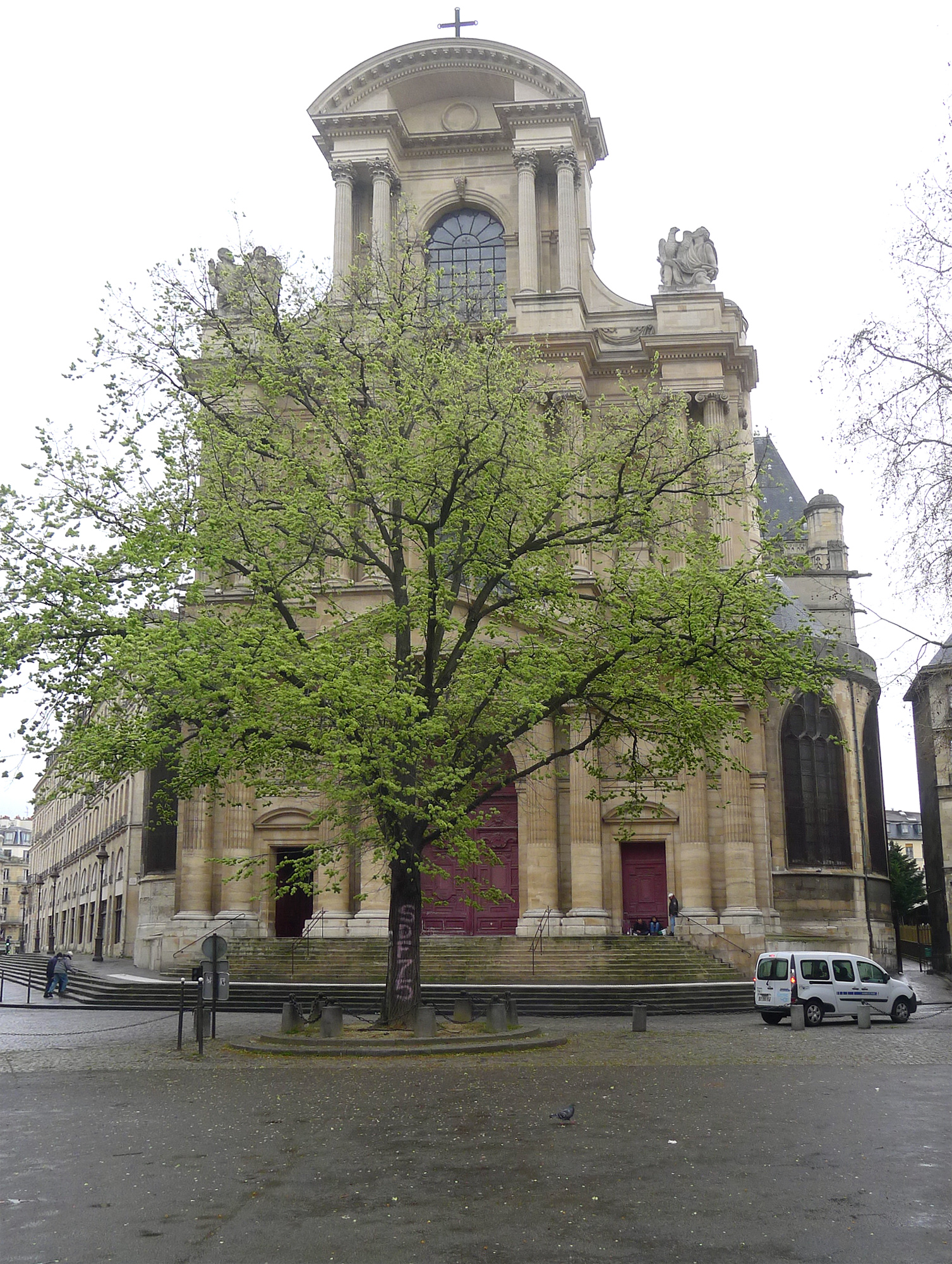
- The elm Saint-Gervais in front of the Church Saint-Gervais
- Interactive map of Saint-Gervais elm
- Species: Ulmus minor
- Location: 4th arrondissement of Paris
- Coordinates: 48°51′21″N 2°21′14″E
- Height: 15 m (49 ft)
- Girth: 1.9 m (6 ft 3 in)
- Date seeded: 1935

The Saint-Gervais elm is a field elm located in front of the church Saint-Gervais-Saint-Protais in the 4th arrondissement of Paris.

== History ==
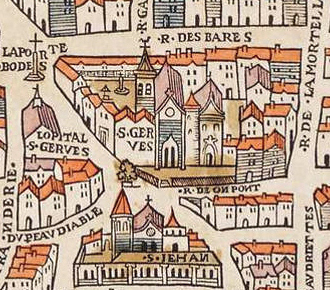
The elm in front of the church on the plan by Truschet & Hoyau (circa 1550).

The presence of an elm tree on this site is attested as early as the 13th century. It was a meeting point for people at the end of the masses in the church. Under this elm, justice was served. And around it, people gathered to collect their debts. They said : "Wait for me under the elm!".

Because of the presence of this tree, the Place Saint-Gervais was long called the Carrefour de l'Orme or the Carrefour de l'Orme-Saint-Gervais.

The Saint-Gervais elm was cut down and replanted many times. For example, during the French Revolution on 20 February 1794) to be used to make cannon carriages. It was replanted in the middle of 19th century, and again on March 10, 1914.

== Description ==
The current tree was planted in 1935. It is about 15 m (49 ft) tall and its trunk, characterized by a curious scar caused by lightning, has a circumference of 1.9 m (6 ft 3 in) The tree received the national label remarkable trees of France in 2005.

== The elm tree in art ==
The tree was so famous that its painted or sculpted representations were used as decorations, particularly in many shops or on balconies.

Some church stalls still bear its motif. This motif is still reproduced in the ironwork on the balconies of the 2nd floor of the buildings at Nos. 2 to 14 of Rue François-Miron, adjoining the church. These buildings, dating from the time of Louis XV, were also known as the "elm houses."

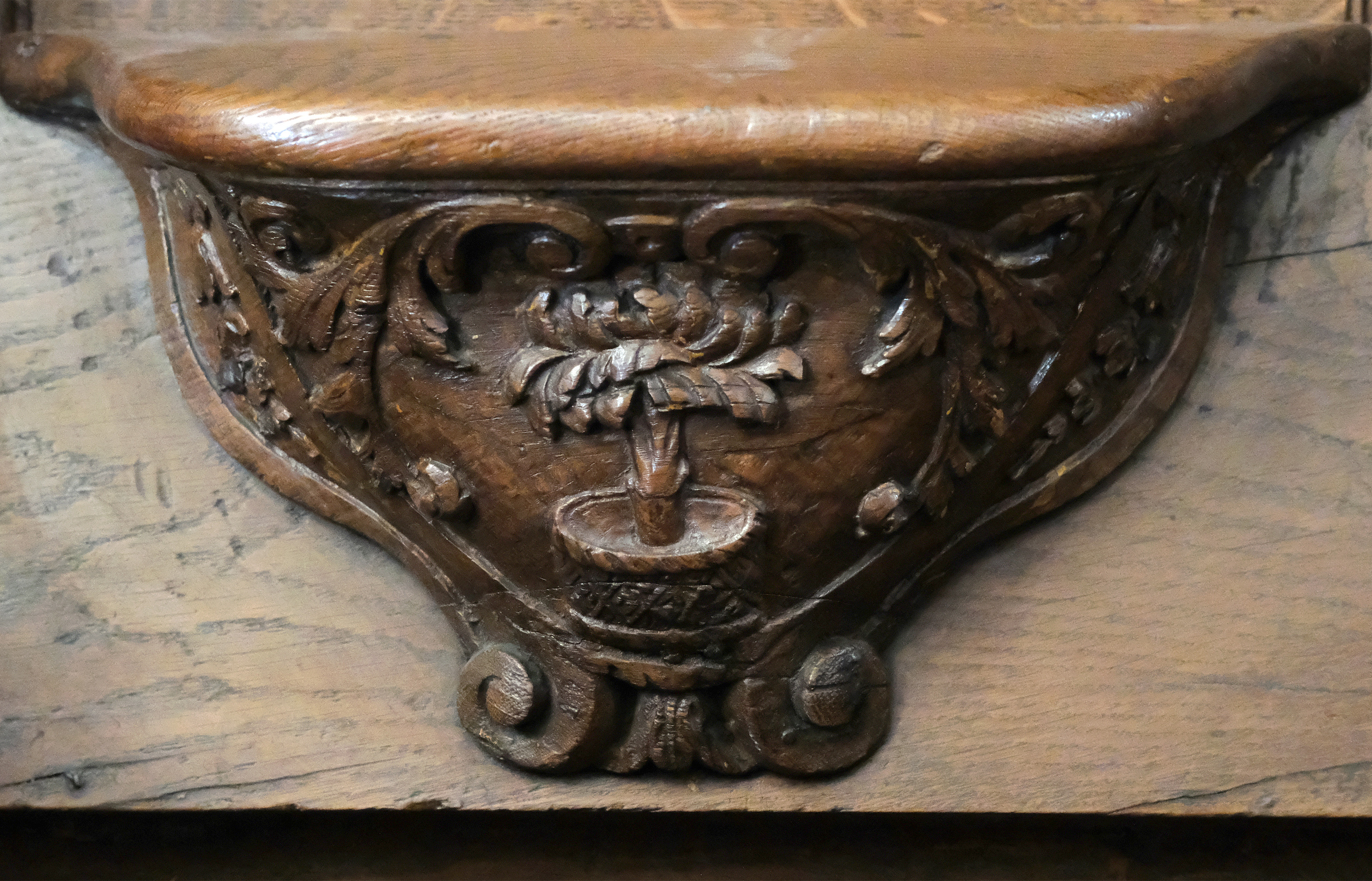
Misericord of the church Saint-Gervais-Saint-Protais.

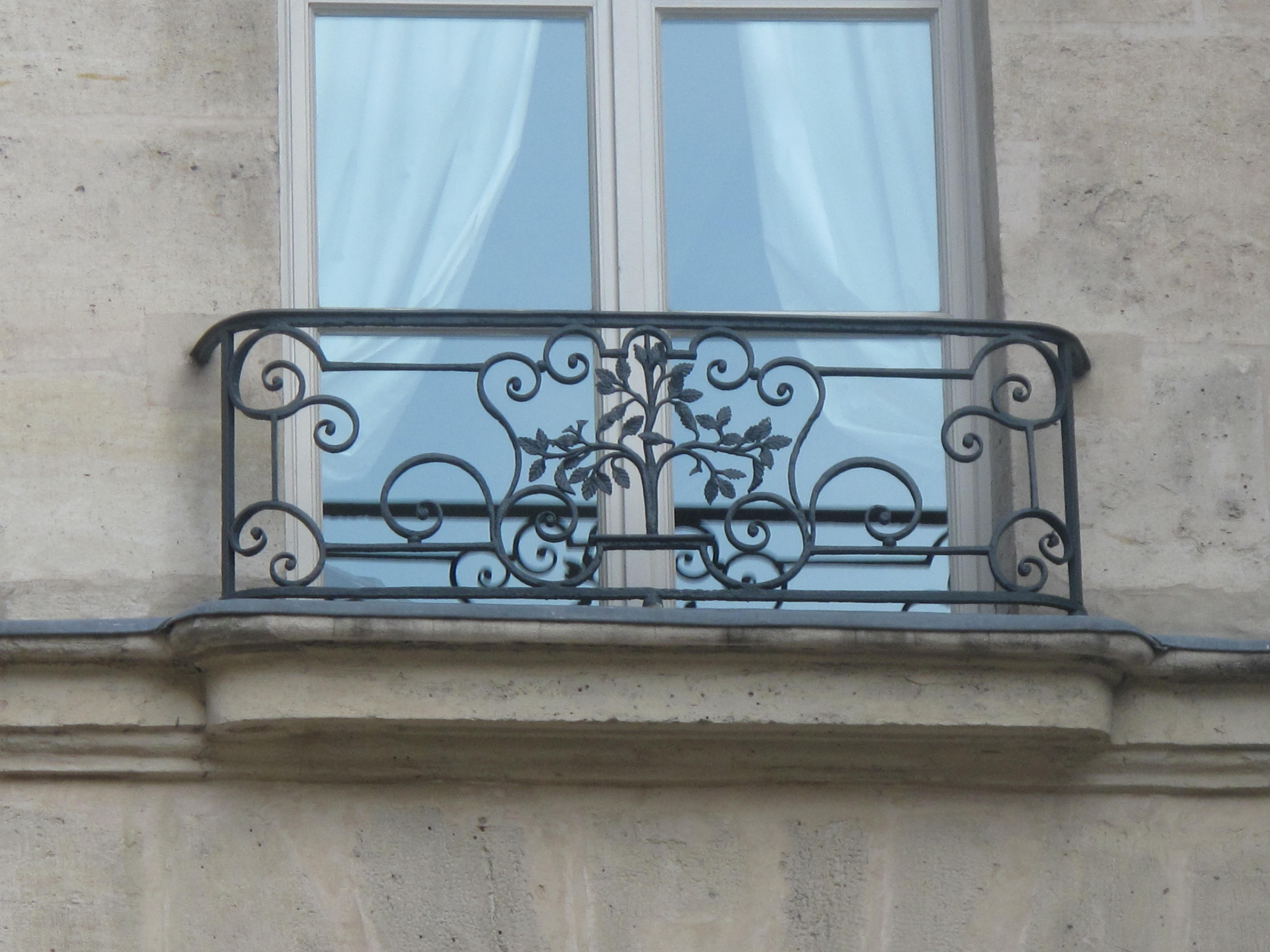
Balcony of a building of the square.

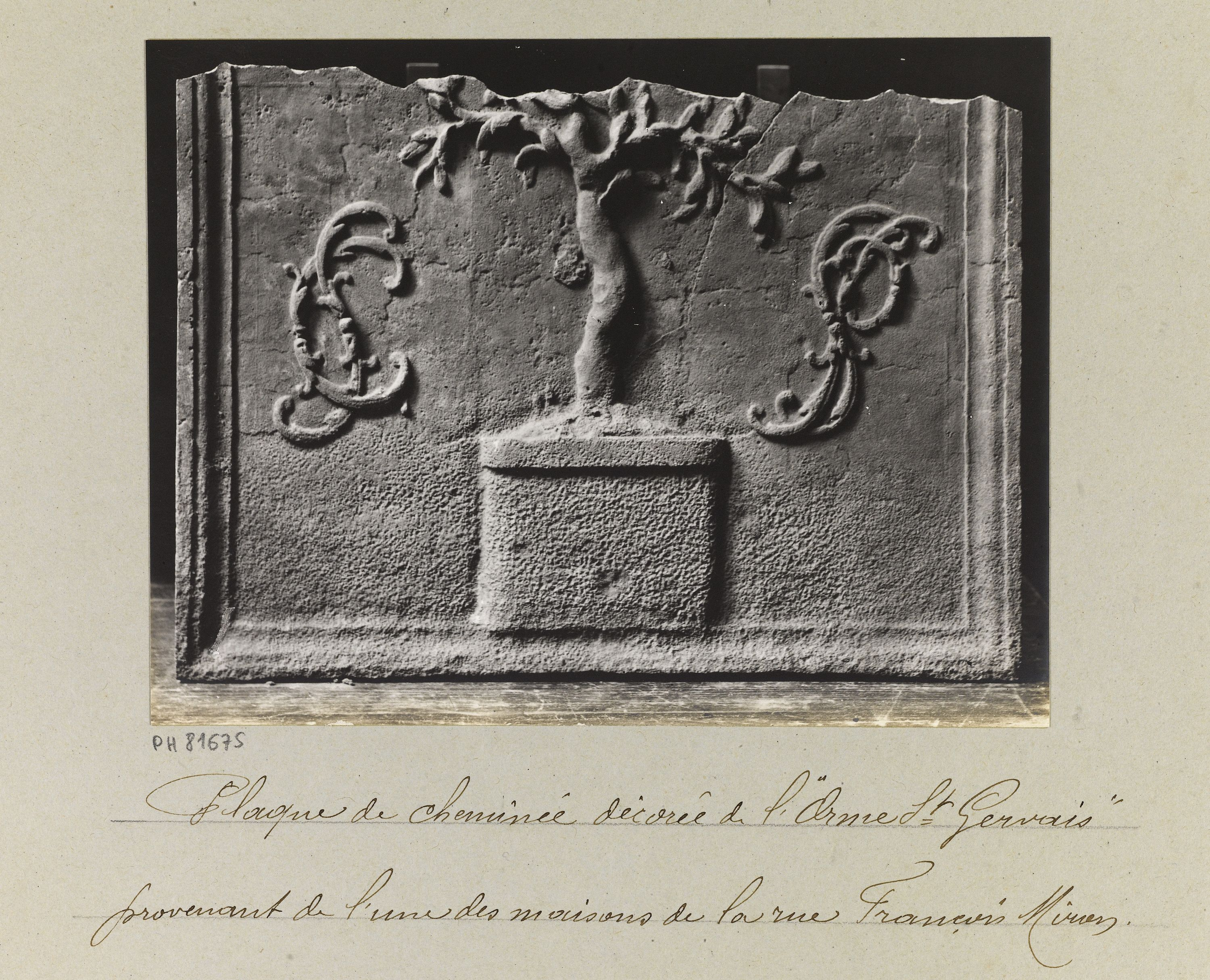
Fireplace fireback from a house
