= Warren County Special Services School District =

School district in Warren County, New Jersey, US

Coordinates: 40.971597°N 74.089285°W

- 682 Oxford Road Oxford Township, Warren County, New Jersey, 07863

District information
- Grades: Spec Svcs
- Superintendent: Joseph E. Flynn
- Business administrator: James Schlessinger
- Schools: 1

Students and staff
- Enrollment: 33 (as of 2014-15)
- Faculty: 9.5 FTEs
- Student–teacher ratio: 3.5:1

Other information
- District Factor Group: NA
- Website: www.wcsssd.org
| Ind. | Per pupil | District spending | Rank (*) | Spec Svcs average | %± vs. average |
|---|---|---|---|---|---|
| 1A | Total Spending | $43,266 | 2 | $18,891 | 129.0% |
| 1 | Budgetary Cost | 35,748 | 1 | 57,252 | −37.6% |
| 2 | Classroom Instruction | 21,536 | 1 | 32,861 | −34.5% |
| 6 | Support Services | 6,253 | 2 | 11,945 | −47.7% |
| 8 | Administrative Cost | 5,690 | 4 | 5,725 | −0.6% |
| 10 | Operations & Maintenance | 1,603 | 1 | 6,215 | −74.2% |
| 16 | Median Teacher Salary | 63,424 | 2 | 77,183 |
Data from NJDoE 2014 Taxpayers' Guide to Education Spending. *Of Spec Svcs districts with any number of students. Lowest spending=1; Highest=8

The Warren County Special Services School District is a special education public school district based in Oxford Township, serving the educational needs of classified students ages 3 to 21 from Warren County, in the U.S. state of New Jersey.

As of the 2014-15 school year, the district and its one school had an enrollment of 33 students and 9.5 classroom teachers (on an FTE basis), for a student–teacher ratio of 3.5:1.

== Administration ==
Core members of the district's administration are:

- Joseph E. Flynn, superintendent
- James Schlessinger, business administrator and board secretary
