= Oxford Furnace =

- U.S. National Register of Historic Places
- U.S. Historic district – Contributing property
- New Jersey Register of Historic Places
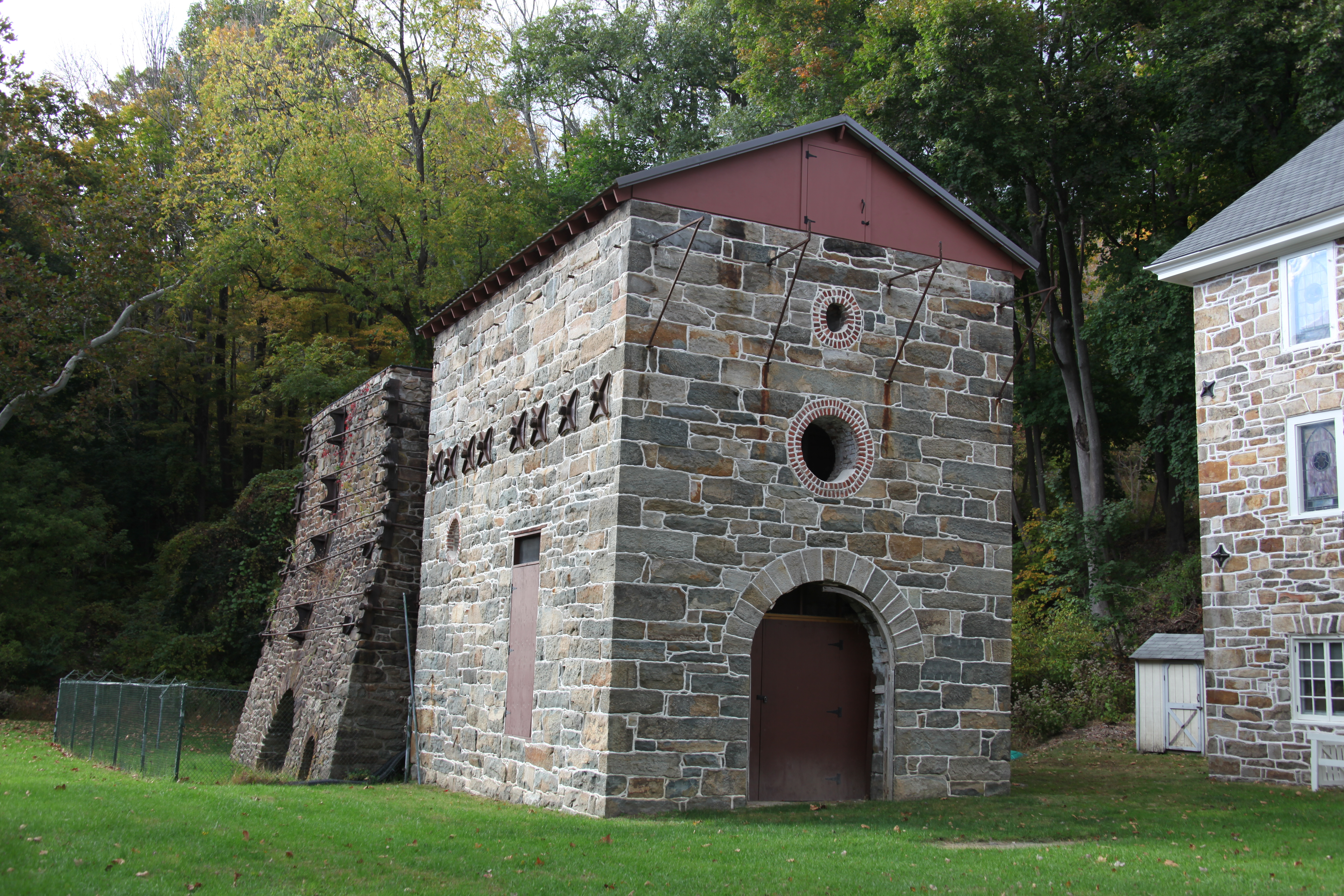
- Oxford Furnace in 2015

- Location within Warren County, New Jersey Location within New Jersey Location within the United States
- Location: Belvidere and Washington Avenues; Oxford, New Jersey
- Coordinates: 40°48′14″N 74°59′52″W
- Area: 0.6 acres (0.24 ha)
- Part of: Oxford Industrial Historic District (ID91001471)
- NRHP reference No.: 77000919
- NJRHP No.: 2775

Significant dates
- Added to NRHP: July 6, 1977
- Designated CP: August 27, 1992
- Designated NJRHP: January 1, 1977

Oxford Furnace is a historic blast furnace on Washington Avenue, near the intersection with Belvidere Avenue, in Oxford, Oxford Township, Warren County, New Jersey. The furnace was built by Jonathan Robeson (c. 1695–1766) in 1741 and produced its first pig iron in 1743. The first practical use in the United States of hot blast furnace technology took place here in 1834. The furnace was added to the National Register of Historic Places on July 6, 1977 for its significance in industry during the 19th century. It was later added as a contributing property to the Oxford Industrial Historic District on August 27, 1992.

== History ==
Oxford Furnace was the third charcoal furnace in colonial New Jersey and the first constructed at a site where iron ore was mined. The first two furnaces (Tinton Falls and Mount Holly) extracted ore from bogs in South Jersey, impure deposits called bog iron.

Construction of the Oxford Furnace occurred around 1741 by Jonathan Robeson and Joseph Shippen, Jr., both of Philadelphia, and owned by the Shippen family who lived nearby in Shippen Manor. It produced its first pig iron on March 9, 1743. Early products included fireplace firebacks embossed with the royal coat-of-arms of Great Britain during the reign of King George II.

A grist mill was built adjacent to the furnace in 1813. Later, c. 1909–1915, it was converted into the Oxford Colonial Methodist Church.

In 1834, William Henry, manager of the furnace, achieved the first practical use in the United States of hot blast furnace technology, which increased production by nearly 10%. This technology blew preheated air into the furnace, cutting production time. The next year, 1835, he introduced a hot blast oven placed on top of the stack, which further increased the temperature of the blast and increased production by nearly 40%.

In 1834, Henry's assistant Selden T. Scranton took over the Furnace property. He married Henry's daughter, Jane Henry in 1839. Selden's brother, George W. Scranton, moved to Oxford in 1839 and later married Henry's other daughter, Jane Henry. The brothers bought the Henry & Jordan lease in 1840 and operated the furnace. Charles, another of the Scranton brothers, joined the family firm in 1844. The Scranton brothers also worked periodically at a furnace in "Slocum's Hollow" (now Scranton) in Pennsylvania. During this time, iron furnaces were changing to the use of coal as fuel (instead of wood and charcoal), and the brothers invested in railroads. Access to the anthracite coal from Pennsylvania and via the nearby Morris Canal enabled the Furnace to run.

The Oxford Iron Company was incorporated in 1859 by George and Selden T. Scranton, following George's withdrawal from the partnership. During the Civil War, the furnace was flourishing and industrial expansion occurred in Oxford. In 1863, the furnace property and Shippen Manor were sold to the Oxford Iron Company, two years following the death of George Scranton.

In 1871, Selden and Charles Scranton and Eugene Henry built the new furnace (Oxford Number 2), but it was not as successful. This used up their available capital at the start of the worst depression of the 19th c. (see Panic of 1873) Selden believed that Samuel Sloan, a New York politician, was to blame for the depression. Sloan learned about railroads from Commodore Vanderbilt and was recently made the president of the Delaware, Lackawanna, and Western Railroad. This rail line hauled about 60,000 tons of anthracite a year and delivered it to the Oxford Furnace.

Selden attempted but failed to avoid bankruptcy in 1874, and by 1878, he tried to avoid losing his mines to foreclosure.

Oxford Furnace operated the longest of any of the colonial furnaces, not being "blown out" until 1884. It was rendered unusable due to a failure of the inner wall above the tuyere in the north tuyere arch (a large crack in the masonry occurred over time).

William Henry died in 1878 and Eugene Henry in 1883. Charles, who was the more level-headed and kind of the family, died when he fell from a railroad car in 1887. Two years later, William Henry, Jr. and George's sold, William Henry Scranton, both died. That same year, the Oxford Iron Co. went bankrupt and was purchased four years later by Oxford Iron and Nail Co, but by 1895, the company went into receivership four years later. The company was reorganized by Empire Steel & Iron Co., which sold and moved the rolling mills, and rebuilt Furnace #2, which ran until 1921. The next year, the only industry operating in Oxford was mining, which occurred in the area from before the Oxford Furnace was built in 1741 until the early 1960s.

By 1884, he was in financial ruin and the Board of the Delaware, Lackawanna, and Warren Railroad voted to "pay him a 'gratuity' of $62.50 a month." While his house was sold in the midst of the foreclosure of his properties, a group of old associates purchased the property and let him live there "under the direction of a trustee."

The State of New Jersey acquired possession of the two furnaces by 1935. Furnace #2 was razed in the 1980s/1990s. The older of the furnace still stands, in part, in Oxford as a memory of a day long gone by.

A restoration of the furnace occurred between 1997 and 2001.

== Gallery ==
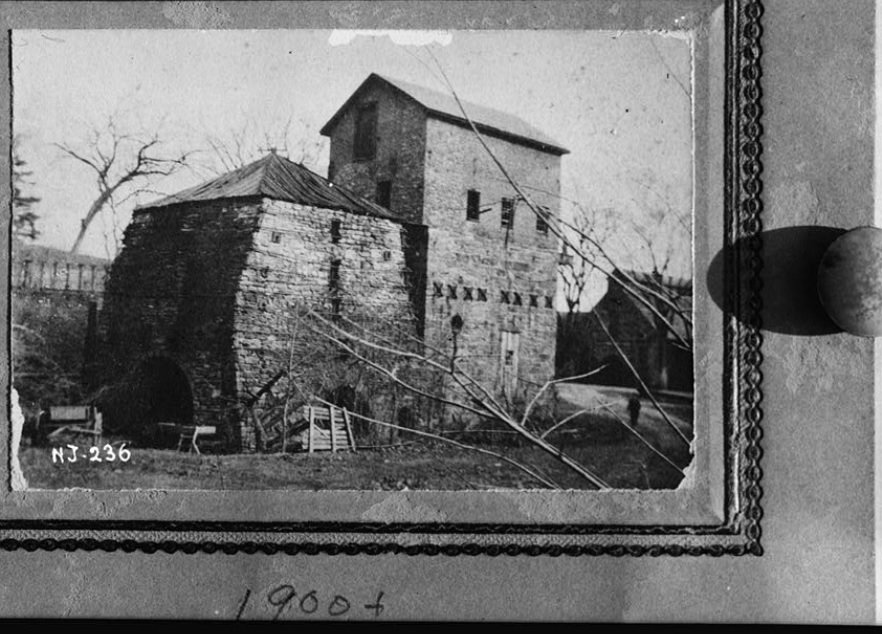
Historic American Buildings Survey, Copy of an old print - Oxford Furnace, Oxford, Warren County, NJ (1936)

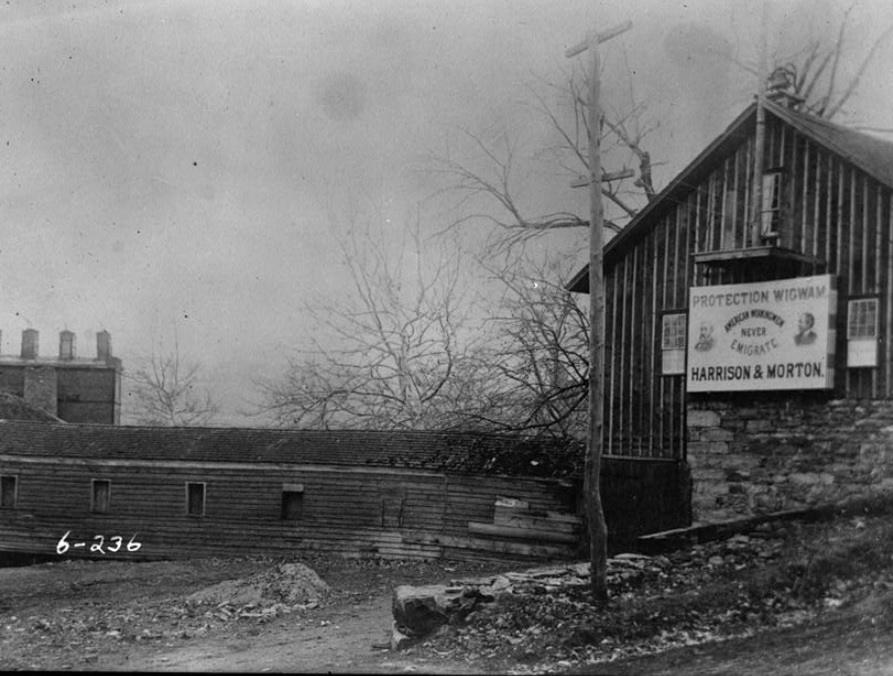
Historic American Buildings Survey R. Merritt Lacey, Photographer October 14, 1936 EXTERIOR - NORTH ELEVATION FROM OLD PRINT - Oxford Furnace, Oxford, Warren County, NJ

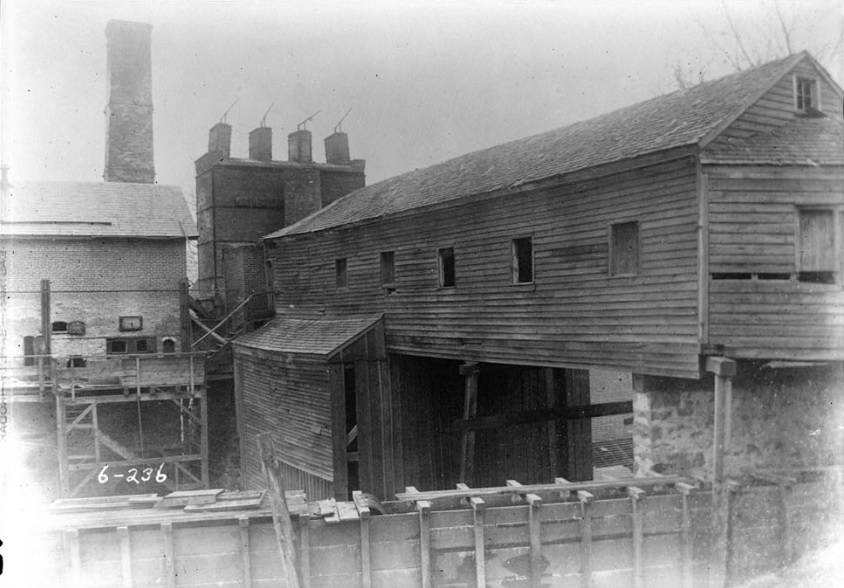
Historic American Buildings Survey R. Merritt Lacey, Photographer October 14, 1936 EXTERIOR - NORTH AND WEST ELEVATIONS FROM OLD PRINT - Oxford Furnace, Oxford, Warren County, NJ

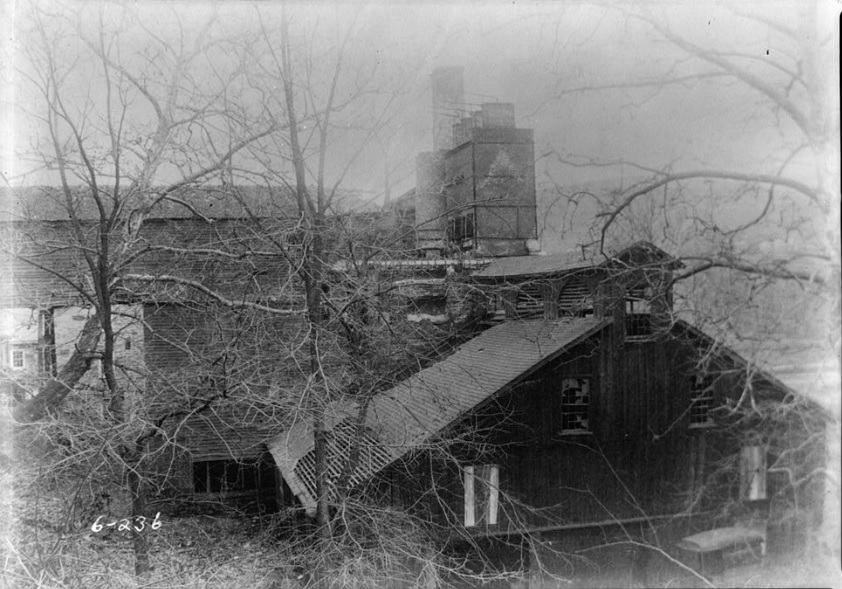
Historic American Buildings Survey R. Merritt Lacey, Photographer October 14, 1936 EXTERIOR - WEST AND NORTH ELEVATIONS FROM OLD PRINT - Oxford Furnace, Oxford, Warren County, NJ

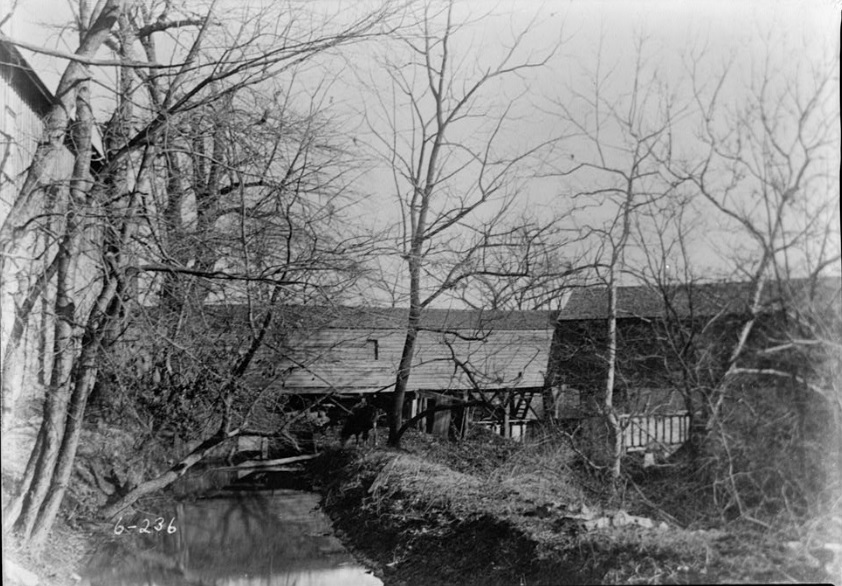
Historic American Buildings Survey R. Merritt Lacey, Photographer October 14, 1936 EXTERIOR - EAST ELEVATION FROM OLD PRINT - Oxford Furnace, Oxford, Warren County, NJ

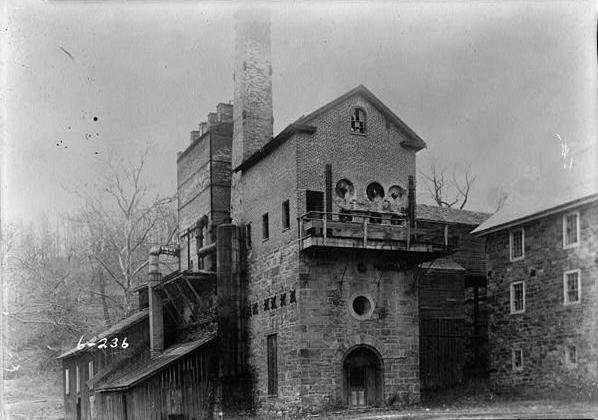
Historic American Buildings Survey R. Merritt Lacey, Photographer October 14, 1936 ENGINE HOUSE - EAST AND SOUTH ELEVATIONS FROM OLD PRINT - Oxford Furnace, Oxford, Warren County, NJ

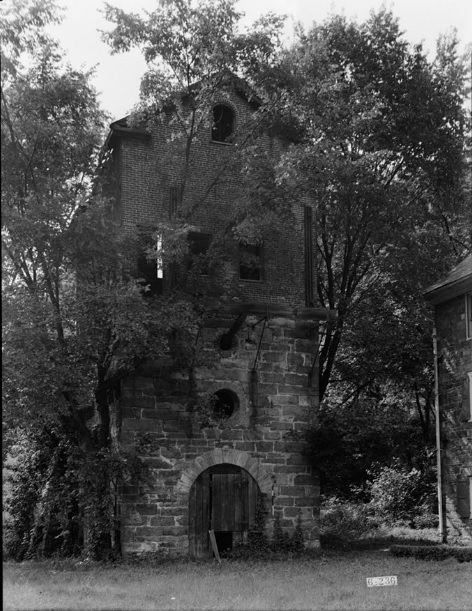
Historic American Buildings Survey Nathaniel R. Ewan, Photographer July 30, 1936 ENGINE HOUSE - EAST ELEVATION - Oxford Furnace, Oxford, Warren County, NJ

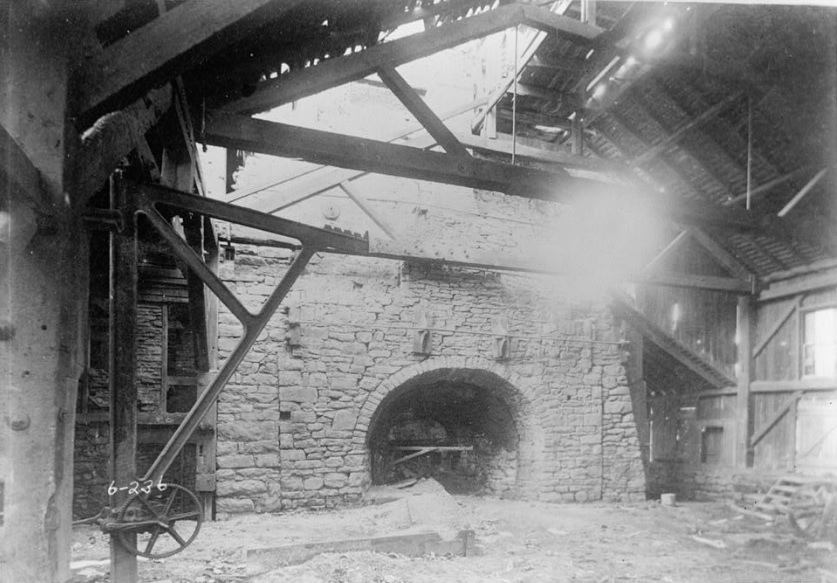
Historic American Buildings Survey R. Merritt Lacey, Photographer October 14, 1936 FURNACE STACK WEST ELEVATION FROM OLD PRINT STRUCTURE SINCE REMOVED - Oxford Furnace, Oxford, Warren County, NJ

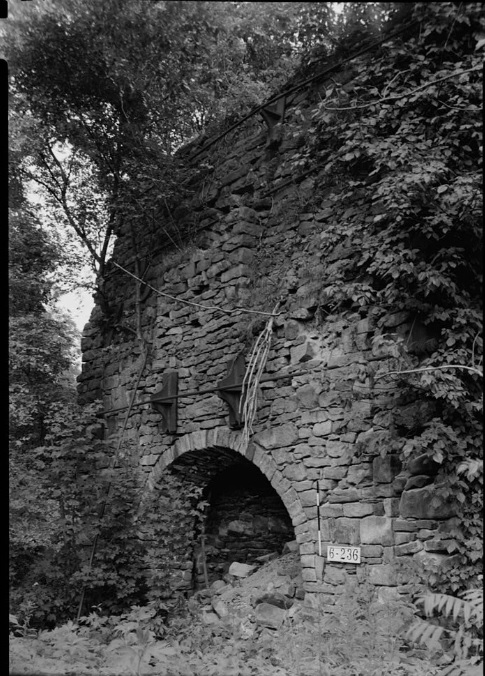
Historic American Buildings Survey Nathaniel R. Ewan, Photographer July 30, 1936 BOSH - WEST ELEVATION - Oxford Furnace, Oxford, Warren County, NJ

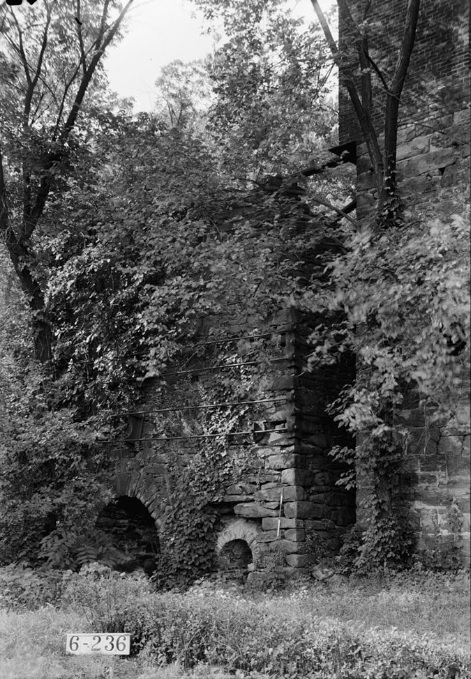
Historic American Buildings Survey Nathaniel R. Ewan, Photographer July 30, 1936 BOSH - SOUTH ELEVATION - Oxford Furnace, Oxford, Warren County, NJ

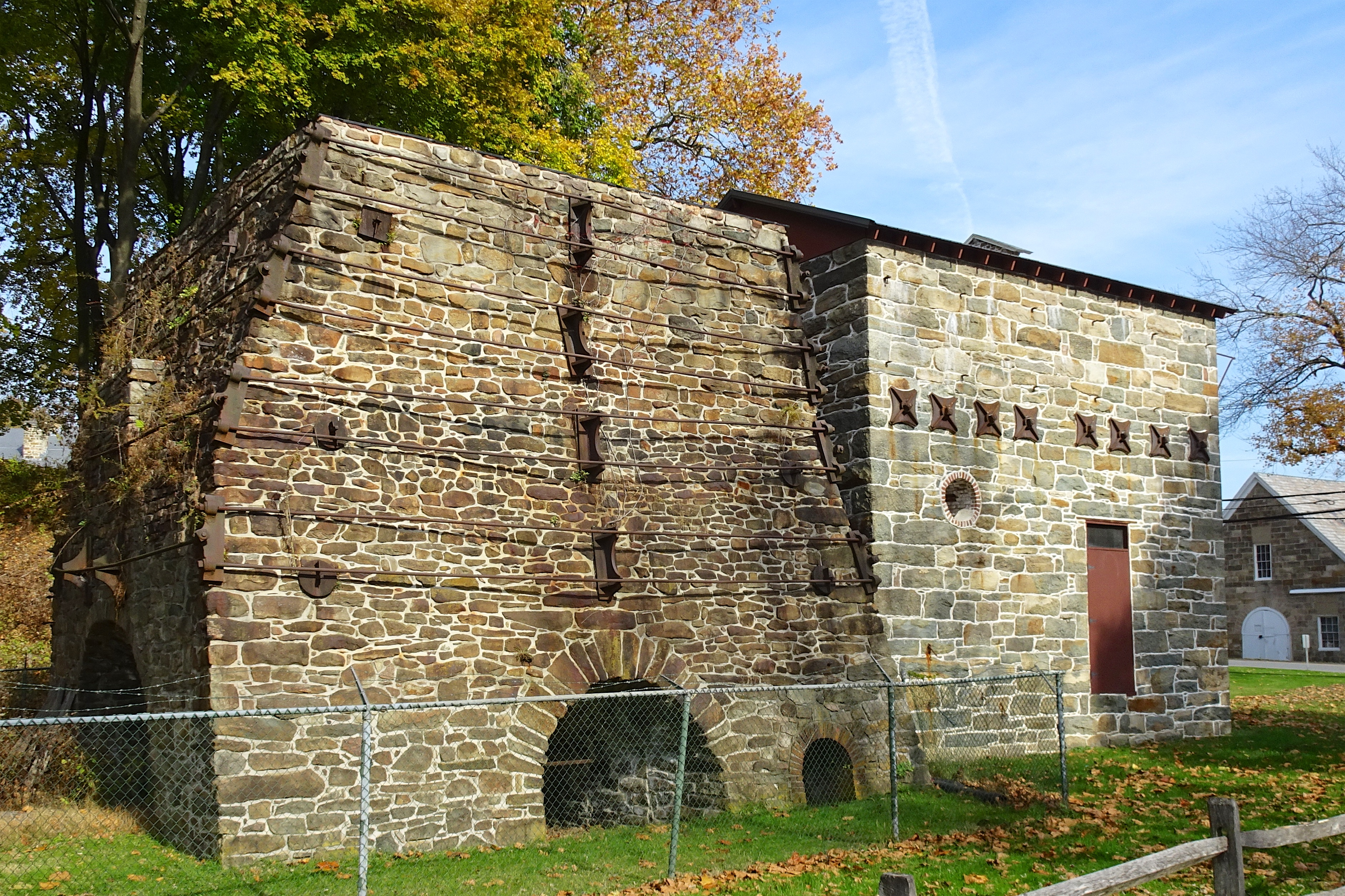
The furnace, on the left, and the engine (blowing) house, on the right

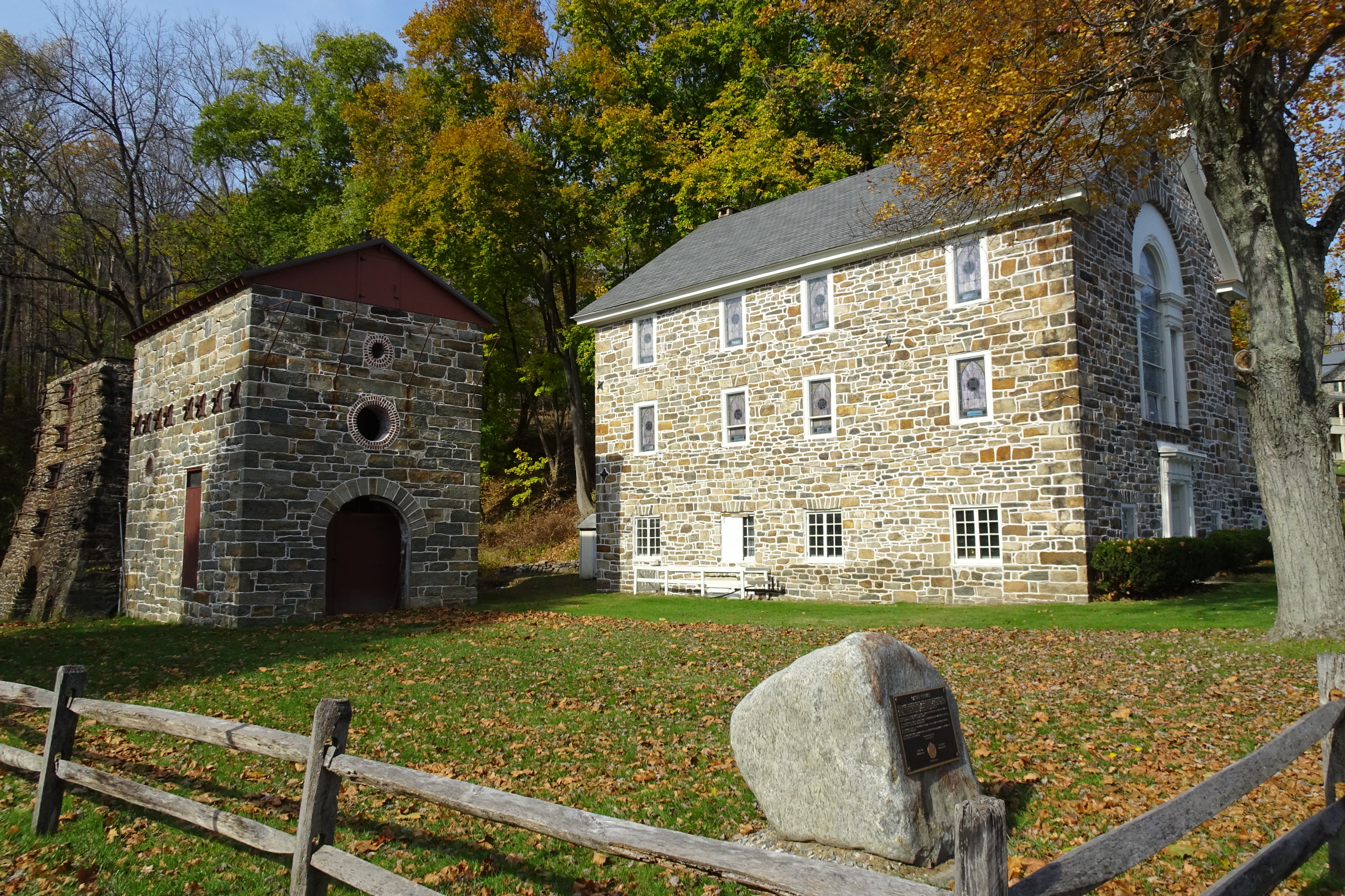
Oxford Furnace next to the Oxford Methodist Church (formerly the grist mill/granary)

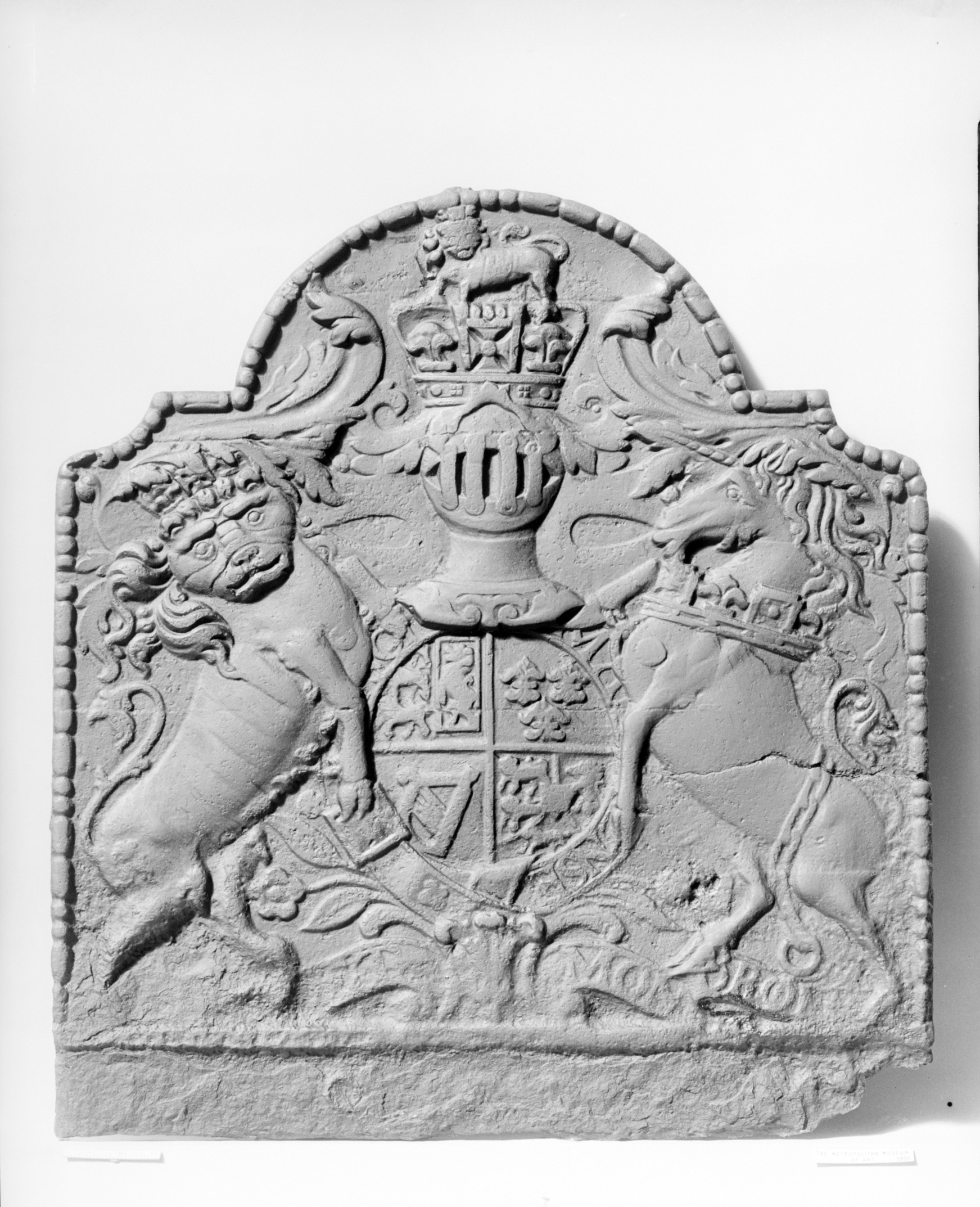
Fireplace fireback cast at Oxford Furnace, 1745–58

== Notable people ==
- George M. Robeson (1829–1897), Union general during the Civil War, and then Secretary of the Navy during the Ulysses S. Grant presidency

== See also ==
- National Register of Historic Places listings in Warren County, New Jersey
