= Shippen Manor =

Historic house in New Jersey, United States

- U.S. National Register of Historic Places
- U.S. Historic district – Contributing property
- New Jersey Register of Historic Places
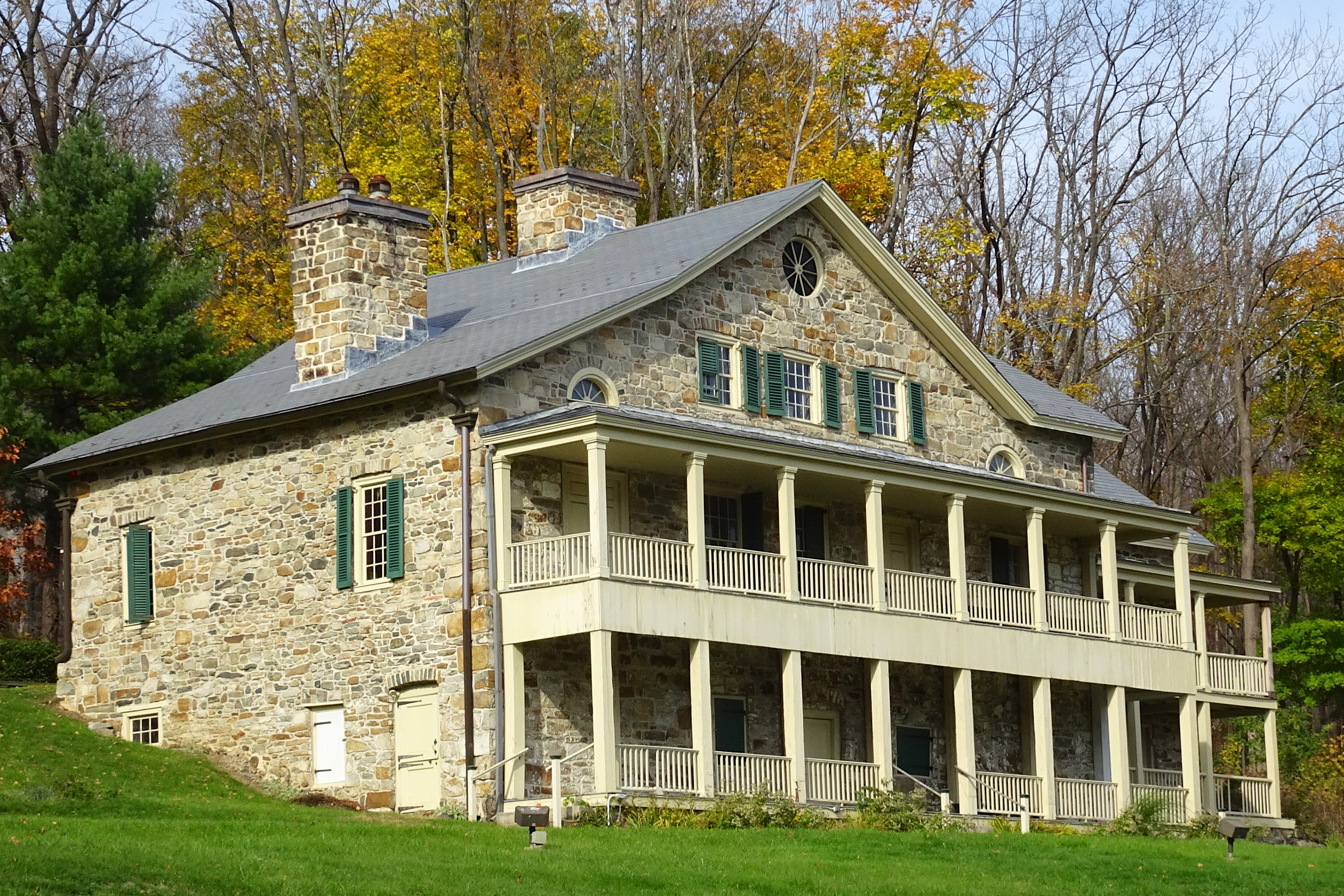

- Location within Warren County, New Jersey Location within New Jersey Location within the United States
- Location: Belvidere Road, Oxford Township, New Jersey
- Coordinates: 40°48′19″N 74°59′51″W
- Area: 2.1 acres (0.85 ha)
- Built: 1755
- Architectural style: Georgian architecture
- Part of: Oxford Industrial Historic District (ID91001471)
- NRHP reference No.: 84000517
- NJRHP No.: 2777

Significant dates
- Added to NRHP: December 20, 1984
- Designated CP: August 27, 1992
- Designated NJRHP: November 11, 1984

Shippen Manor is located in Oxford Township, Warren County, New Jersey, United States. The manor was built in 1755 and was added to the National Register of Historic Places on December 20, 1984, for its significance in architecture and industry. It was later added as a contributing property to the Oxford Industrial Historic District on August 27, 1992.

== History ==
Shippen Manor was built c. 1754 on an estate of four thousand acres for William Shippen Sr. and his brother Joseph Shippen Jr.. The brothers owned the nearby Oxford Furnace and would manage the furnace from this home. The old furnace produced iron from 1741 to 1882.

According to George Wyckoff Cummins' book, The History of Warren County, NJ (1911), "The Shippen family, who at the time of the [American Revolution] came into possession of Oxford Furnace". During the war, part of the family were identified as "Loyalists" (Loyal to the British Crown) while others were considered "Patriots". The great-niece of William Shippen Sr. was Mrs. Margaret "Peggy" Shippen Arnold, wife of traitorous general, Benedict Arnold. (The part of the Shippen family associated with the Manor were originally Quakers and chose to not choose a side during the war, even though they profited from it.) Peggy Shippen married Arnold on 8 April 1779 when she was nineteen and he was thirty-eight and a Colonel in the US Army. They neither lived at nor visited Shippen Manor. She was the youngest of the three daughters of Chief Justice Edward Shippen IV (1729-1806), who was neither a Patriot nor Loyalist.

Joseph William Shippen, son of William Sr., managed his father's estate in Oxford for nearly thirty years. He was involved in a consensual relationship with his housekeeper, Martha Axford, the only daughter of John and Anna Beach Axford. (Note: Although the book refers to Joseph William Shippen and Martha Axford as being "married", there is no documentation to prove that they were legally married.)

Before 1831, Morris Robeson, Esq. (grandson of Jonathan Robeson, came into possession of the Manor and Furnace. From 1831 to 1842, Henry Jordan & Co., who manufactured stoves until 1839, leased the property from Morris Robeson's widow. The Scranton brothers, George W. and Selden T. Scranton, took charge of the Furnace, related industries and the Manor, which continued to house the iron masters.

In the later part of the 19th c., the Manor was referred to as the "Fowler House" and boarded workers in Oxford.

During the 20th c., it transferred hands a few times, ultimately becoming property of the State of New Jersey who transferred ownership to the County of Warren. Today it is a county museum and houses the offices of the Warren County Division of Cultural & Heritage Affairs, a division of the Department of Land Preservation.

The Warren County Board of Chosen Freeholders (currently the Warren County Board of County Commissioners) acquired the property in 1984 for $64,500. Negotiations by the former Warren County Cultural & Heritage Commission were made to purchase the property. The county further appropriated $23,000 to have a structures report completed. In 1984, the F.M. Kirby Foundation of Morristown, New Jersey gave the commission a $10,000 grant to help with restorations. Governor Thomas H. Kean signed a supplementary budget in 1985 totaling $150,000 for the Manor's restoration.

This site is related to the Oxford Furnace in Oxford, NJ, and both are properties of the County of Warren in New Jersey. Both sites are listed on the State & National Register of Historic Places (1984).

== Design ==
The manor is built in Georgian style with local stone. The walls are two feet thick and there are three chimneys. The ground floors is divided into six rooms. The upper floor consists of two bed chambers and four garret rooms.

According to the National Register of Historic Places, "Shippen Manor is a large, stone, 18th century dwelling prominently sited on the hillside overlooking the village of Oxford, an 18th and 19th century iron mining and manufacturing center for which it long served as the ironmaster's residence."

Exterior:

The main block of Shippen Manor is a five-bay, 2 1/2-story, gable-roofed, stone structure that measures about 55 feet wide and 36 feet deep. Due to the slope that the structure is built upon, it has a basement that is fully above grade on the east side and two stories above.

A local granitic rock (gneiss), which ranges from brown to gray, often with reddish stains, was used to construct the Manor's rubble and coursed rubble stone work. Large, rough squared blocks were used for the corner quoins.

Interior:

The main and second story of the main block retained much of the early fabric and also reveal extensive 19th and 20th century alterations.

On the ground floor, the floorplans are defined by the interior stone walls. On the first floor, there are five rooms: two at the south end, two in the middle that are connected by a hallway, and one on the north that extends the full depth of the house. The east hall houses the staircase to the second floor and the west end serves as the entry.

The upper level of the building is similar to the main floor, but with few exceptions—south end rooms are garrets under the eaves. The west middle room was partitioned off for a bathroom, with a small passage that connected it to the stairway. The north end has two rooms divided by a hallway that now serve as offices.

== Surroundings and site ==
The upper driveway of the Manor, on its west side, was the former railroad spur that led down into the Furnace area. The railroad alignment is evident south of Belvidere Road and continued along the northern edge of the property where there is evidence of old buildings that no longer exist (two barns and a wagon house). There was also evidence of a springhouse, which no longer exists, on the property. The driveway loops around the north side of the building, to the east side and back onto Belvidere Avenue.

Some of the outbuildings that no longer exist at the Manor include:

1. 18' x 20.5' mortared stone foundation that possibly had a timber upper story. The east and north walls survive and are about 8 feet tall and 18 inches thick. This was most likely the wagon or carriage house.
2. 13.5' x 16' stone foundation with a concrete sill with a water stand pipe and brick rubble inside. The walls are 15 inches thick. The driveway retaining wall links with this structure that was some sort of access between this and the wagon/carriage house.
3. 16' wide, unknown length, it may be a continuation of the 2nd structure. Walls are 18 inches thick and may have been bonded with structure #4.
4. Approximately 32' long, width unknown, with only the east wall surviving (about 6.75' tall and 2.75' wide). It has mortared faces and a dry rubble core and possibly supported a large frame barn on top. The southern end curves into the hillside, probably to attempt to buttress the foundation.
5. 19' in one dimension, the other unknown. Ground-level lines on the west and north side exist, but the building itself does not. The west wall may have been 7 feet thick but tumbled to the east. The north wall was about 3 feet thick, but the function was unknown.
6. 57' long, unknown width. Only the east wall (5' high x 1' thick) and part of the south wall survive. A brick, tile and stone foundation showed more than one phase of construction. The basal foundation is stone and is about 36' in length from the southern end and is overlain by brick and tile foundation (extends 57 feet). Hollow flue tiles (which may have been reused from a local industrial structure) were used in the corners of this foundation. As with structure #4, this foundation probably supported a large barn.

The remainder of the property is surrounded by lawn and woodland, and the hill is terraced down the slope to the town of Oxford and is bordered by Belvidere (south) and Washington Avenues (east) and overlooks Route 31 from the hill.

== See also ==
- National Register of Historic Places listings in Warren County, New Jersey
- List of museums in New Jersey
