= Fireplace fireback =

Piece of heavy cast iron

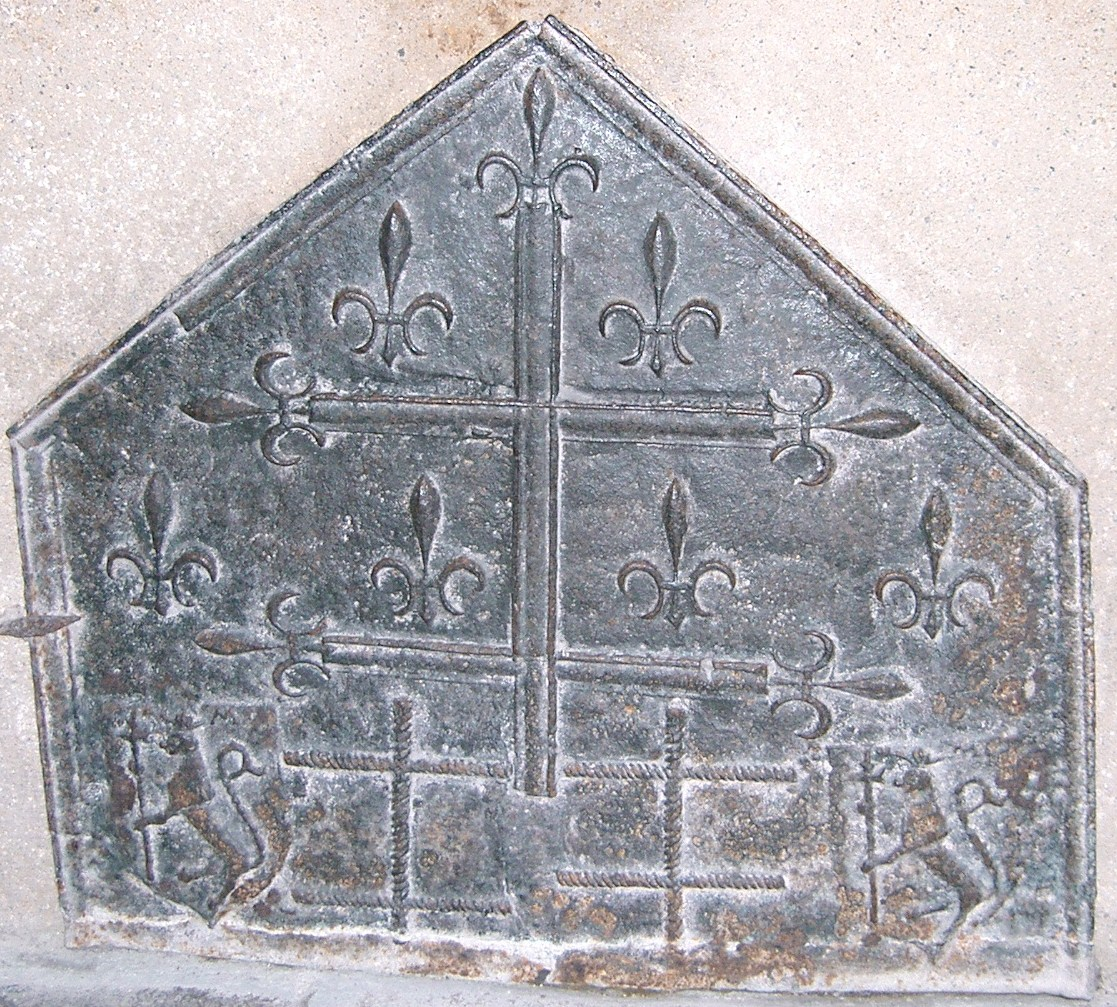
Fireback in the house of Jeanne d'Arc in Domrémy

A fireplace fireback is a piece of heavy cast iron, sized in proportion to the fireplace and the fire, which is placed against the back wall of the fireplace.

== Functions ==
The primary functions of a fireback are to protect the wall at the back of the fireplace and radiate heat from the fire into the room. The protection was especially important where the wall was constructed of insubstantial material such as daub (a mud and straw mixture coating interwoven wooden wattles), brick or soft stone. Protective metal plates that became available when cast iron was developed enabled fires to be placed against walls without danger to the fabric of the building. The other function of the fireback is to act as a radiator of stored heat. The metal is heated by the fire, and then that heat is radiated into the room. The thick iron keeps the heat which would otherwise be lost and gives back this heat to the room. A fireback thus may increase the efficiency of the fire. Wood fires have low efficiency, and for those that prefer the atmosphere of an open wood fire the fireback helps to minimise this problem. The thicker the fireback, the longer (and softer) this radiative effect.

In parts of southern Belgium and the adjacent areas of France and Luxembourg, iron plates formed part of the wall behind kitchen fireplaces allowing the radiative effect to be felt in the room behind, the heat being controlled by erecting a cupboard around the plate, opening or closing the doors of which controlled the heat entering the room; these plates were called takenplatten or taques de foyer.

Old firebacks are nowadays often used as a backsplash above the stove, reminiscent of its old function in the Victorian kitchen. Moreover, they are used as beautiful pieces of decorative art and are sometimes displayed apart from the fireplace.

== History ==
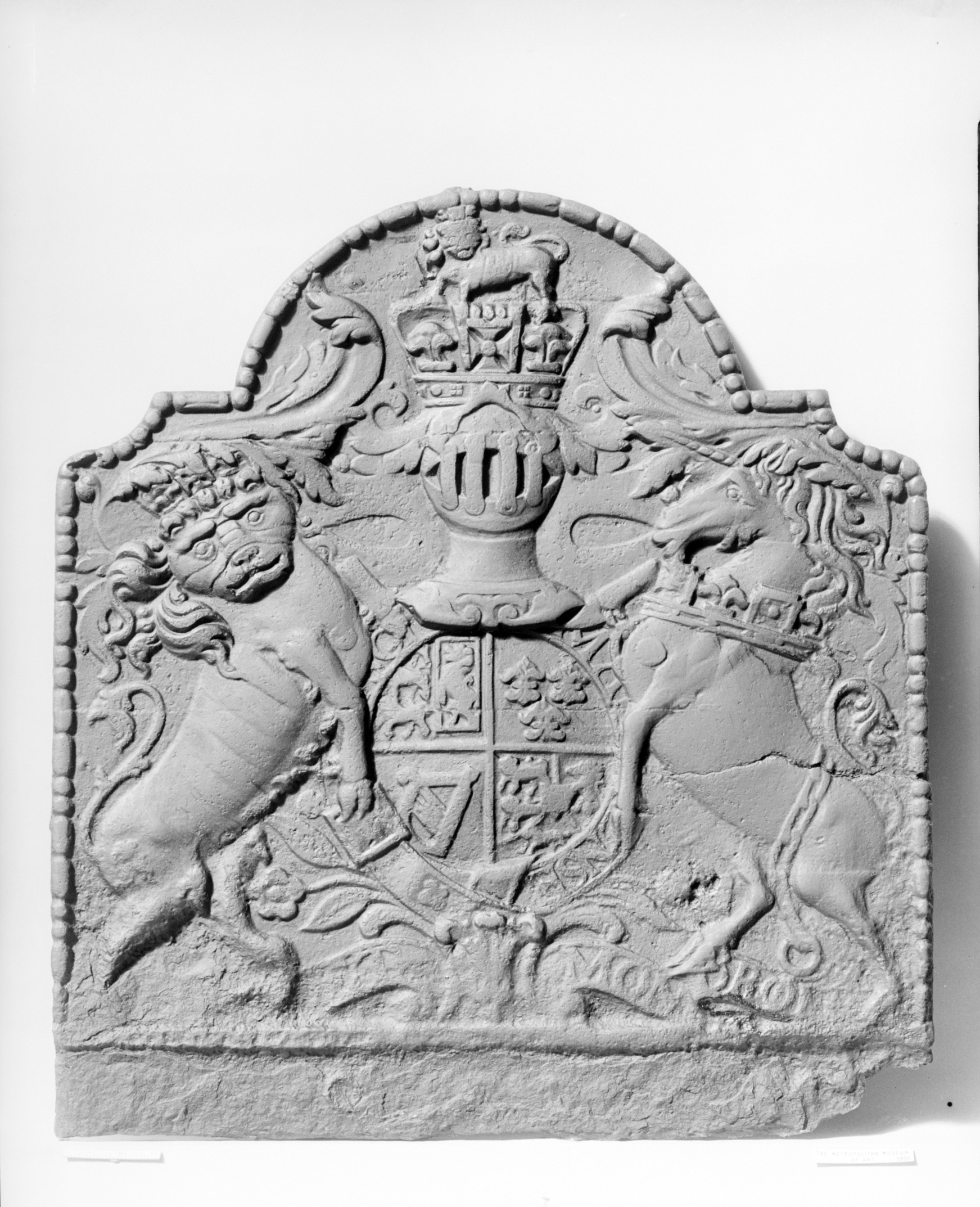
Fireback embossed with royal coat-of-arms of Great Britain, cast at Oxford Furnace, New Jersey during the reign of George II

Firebacks are believed to originate in 5th century China.

The oldest European firebacks date from the 15th century AD, with the earliest surviving, bearing the arms of the coat of arms of King René of Anjou, dated to 1431. Early firebacks were decorated with simple designs derived from everyday objects such as rope, moulds used in the making of certain types of foods (such as butter, biscuits or wafers), furniture fragments and other domestic and personal items. Designs formed from specially-carved wooden stamps (which included letters and numerals) and entire wooden patterns or models gradually became more widely used and often displayed coats of arms of royalty, the church and aristocracy. Pictorial designs with religious themes were common in Germany. Later firebacks bore mythological and allegorical subjects, as well as scenes from nature. Firebacks made for the Dutch market included examples with reference to Dutch independence.

English firebacks may roughly be separated into four stylistic types — those moulded from more than one movable stamp; armorial backs; allegorical, mythological and biblical plates with an occasional portrait; and copies and pastiches of 17th and 18th century continental designs, chiefly Dutch. The fleur-de-lis, the rosette, and other motifs of detached ornament were much used before attempts were made to elaborate a homogeneous design, but by the middle of the 16th century firebacks of a very elaborate type were being produced.

The increasing use of coal as a domestic heating fuel caused a decline in many countries in the need for firebacks and their gradual replacement by integral grates. In France, wood-burning open fireplaces remained popular and firebacks continued to be produced there in the 19th century.

Recastings of historic fireback designs are still made in England and the United States.

== Bibliography ==
- Carpentier, H.: Plaques de cheminées, 1912
- Nygärd-Nilssen, A.: Norsk Jernskulptur, Oslo, 1944
- Aitchison, L.: History of metals, McDonald & Evans, London, 1960
- Mercer, H.: The Bible in Iron, Bucks County Historical Society, Doylestown, 1961
- Kelly, A.: The book of English fireplaces, Country Life Books, Feltham, 1968
- Kippenberger, A.: Die Kunst der Ofenplatten, Verlag Stahleisen, Düsseldorf, 1973
- Theisen, S.: Der Eifeler Eisenkunstguss im 15. und 16. Jahrhundert, Rheinland Verlag, Köln, 1973
- Pesch, D.: Herdgussplatten, Rheinland Verlag, Köln, 1982
- von den Driesch, K.: Handbuch der Ofen-, Kamin- und Takenplatten im Rheinland, Rheinland Verlag, Köln, 1990
- Hodgkinson, J.: British Cast-Iron Firebacks of the sixteenth to mid eighteenth Centuries, HodgersBooks, Crawley, 2010
- Palasi, P.: Plaques de cheminées héraldiques, Éditions Gourcuff-Gradenigo, Paris, 2014
