= Oxford Township, New Jersey =

Township in Warren County, New Jersey, US

- Township
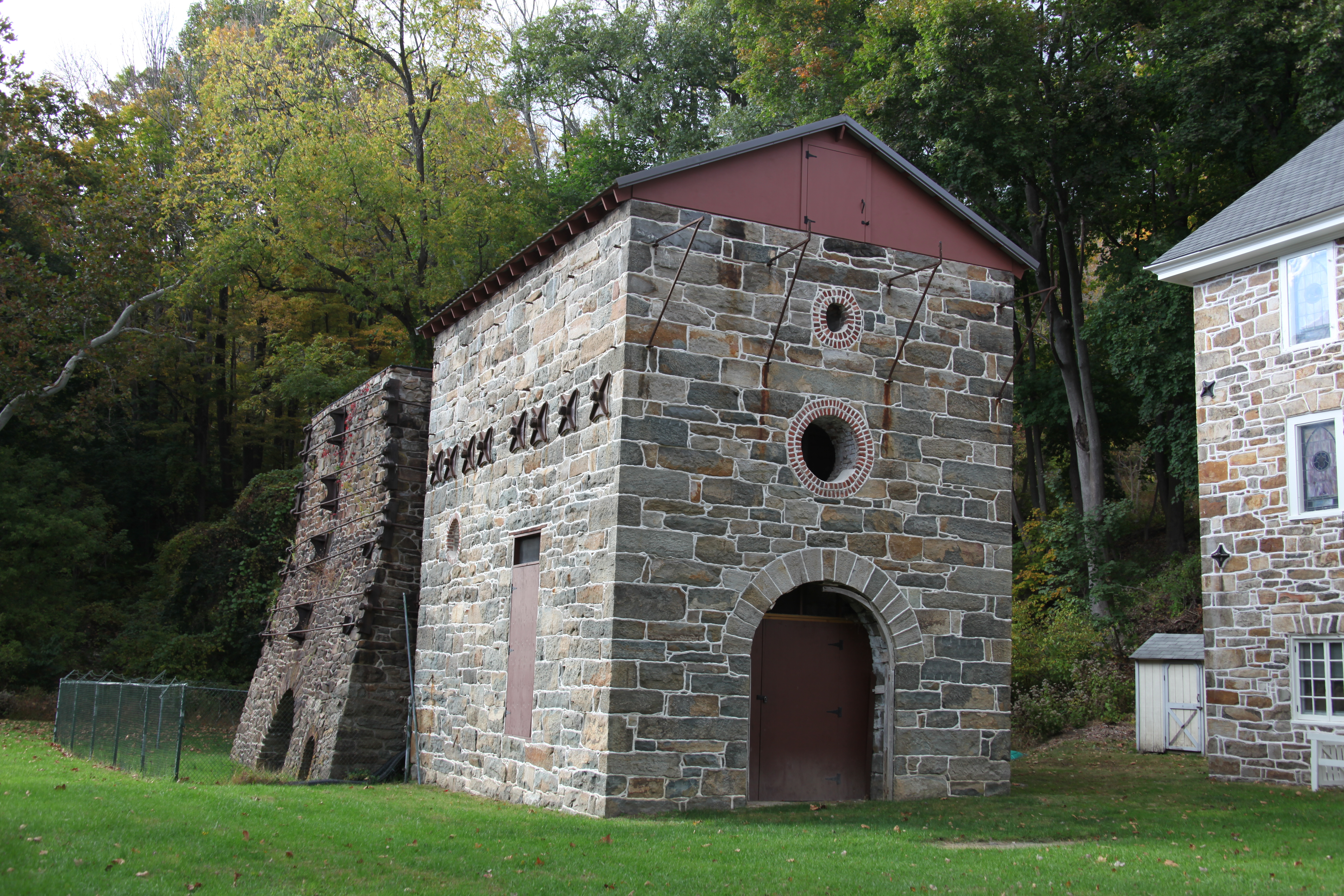
- Oxford Furnace

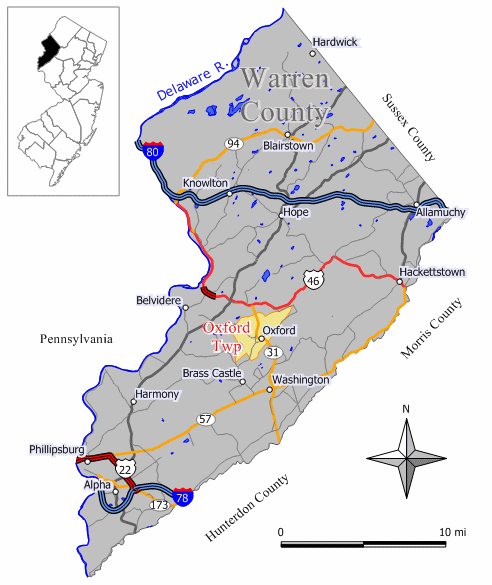
- Location of Oxford Township in Warren County highlighted in yellow (right). Inset map: Location of Warren County in New Jersey highlighted in black (left).

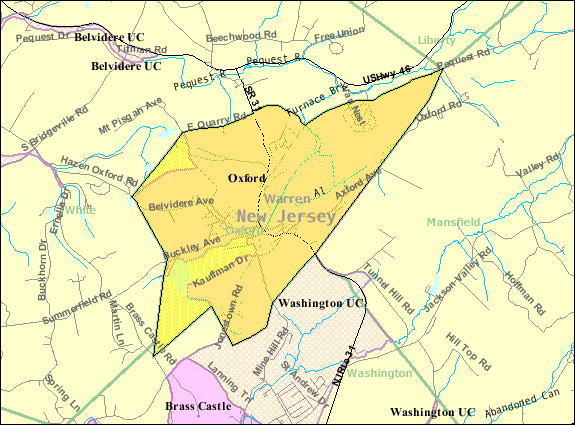
- Census Bureau map of Oxford Township, New Jersey

- Location in Warren County Location in New Jersey Location in the United States
- Coordinates: 40.80865°N 74.993421°W
- Country: United States
- State: New Jersey
- County: Warren
- Established: May 30, 1754
- Incorporated: February 21, 1798

Government
  - Type: Township
  - Body: Township Committee
  - Mayor: Gerald Norton (R, term ends December 31, 2023)
  - Township Administrator: Matthew Hall
  - Municipal clerk: Laurie Barton

Area
  - Total: 6.06 sq mi (15.70 km^{2})
  - Land: 5.96 sq mi (15.43 km^{2})
  - Water: 0.10 sq mi (0.26 km^{2}) 1.67%
  - Rank: 254th of 565 in state 17th of 22 in county
- Elevation: 476 ft (145 m)

Population (2020)
  - Total: 2,444
  - Estimate (2023): 2,464
  - Rank: 471st of 565 in state 18th of 22 in county
  - Density: 410.2/sq mi (158.4/km^{2})
  - Rank: 455th of 565 in state 8th of 22 in county
- Time zone: UTC−05:00 (Eastern (EST))
  - Summer (DST): UTC−04:00 (Eastern (EDT))
- ZIP Code: 07863
- Area code: 908
- FIPS code: 3404155530
- GNIS feature ID: 0882247
- Website: www.oxfordtwpnj.org

Oxford Township is a township in Warren County, in the U.S. state of New Jersey. As of the 2020 United States census, the township's population was 2,444, a decrease of 70 (−2.8%) from the 2010 census count of 2,514, which in turn reflected an increase of 207 (+9.0%) from the 2,307 counted in the 2000 census.

Oxford Township was formed from portions of Greenwich Township on May 30, 1754, while the area was still part of Sussex County. It was incorporated on February 21, 1798, as one of New Jersey's initial group of townships by an act of the New Jersey Legislature. Mansfield Township became part of the newly formed Warren County on November 20, 1824. Over the centuries since its creation, portions of the township were taken to form Knowlton Township (February 23, 1763), Franklin Township, Harmony Township and Hope Township (all on April 8, 1839), Belvidere (April 7, 1845) and White Township (April 9, 1913).

The origin of the name and the exact date of the township's creation is in dispute. One source says that the township was named for the University of Oxford in England, and was formed in either 1753 or 1755, but other sources claim that the township was named after an early settler named John Axford, who came to settle in the area with others between 1735 and 1739, and affirms that the township's creation was in 1755.

Oxford Furnace, constructed in 1741, was the third furnace in Colonial New Jersey and the first constructed at a site where iron ore was mined. Other furnaces used ore extracted from bogs in South Jersey, impure deposits called bog iron. Oxford Furnace operated the longest of any of the Colonial-era furnaces, not being "blown out" until 1884. In 1835, it was the site of America's first successful use of the hot blast in which preheated air was blown into the furnace, cutting production time. Though worn down by time, much of the site still stands. Oxford Furnace is listed on the State and the National Register of Historic Places.

== Geography ==
According to the U.S. Census Bureau, the township had a total area of 6.06 square miles (15.70 km^{2}), including 5.96 square miles (15.43 km^{2}) of land and 0.10 square miles (0.26 km^{2}) of water (1.67%).

Oxford CDP (with a 2020 Census population of 1,033) is an unincorporated community and census-designated place (CDP) located within the township. Oxford CDP and Oxford Township are not coextensive, with the CDP covering 11.7% of the 5.89 miles (9.48 km) of the township as a whole.

Other unincorporated communities, localities and place names located partially or completely within the township include Pequest.

The township borders the Warren County municipalities of Mansfield Township, Washington Township and White Township.

=== Climate ===
Being in the Northeast U.S., Oxford experiences all four seasons with hot humid summers and cold, snowy winters.

== Demographics ==
Historical population
Census	Pop.	Note	%±
1810	2,470		—
1820	3,089		25.1%
1830	3,665		18.6%
1840	2,855	*	−22.1%
1850	1,718	*	−39.8%
1860	2,350		36.8%
1870	2,952		25.6%
1880	4,594		55.6%
1890	4,002		−12.9%
1900	3,695		−7.7%
1910	3,444		−6.8%
1920	2,035	*	−40.9%
1930	1,723		−15.3%
1940	1,548		−10.2%
1950	1,489		−3.8%
1960	1,657		11.3%
1970	1,742		5.1%
1980	1,659		−4.8%
1990	1,790		7.9%
2000	2,307		28.9%
2010	2,514		9.0%
2020	2,444		−2.8%
2023 (est.)	2,464		0.8%
Population sources: 1810–1920 1840; 1850–1870 1850 1870; 1880–1890 1890–1910; 1910–1930 1940–2000; 2000 2010 2020 * = Lost territory in previous decade.

The township's economic data (as is all of Warren County) is calculated by the US Census Bureau as part of the Allentown-Bethlehem-Easton, PA-NJ Metropolitan Statistical Area.

=== 2010 census ===
The 2010 United States census counted 2,514 people, 950 households, and 675 families in the township. The population density was 434.5 per square mile (167.8/km^{2}). There were 1,033 housing units at an average density of 178.5 per square mile (68.9/km^{2}). The racial makeup was 94.99% (2,388) White, 1.63% (41) Black or African American, 0.00% (0) Native American, 1.51% (38) Asian, 0.00% (0) Pacific Islander, 0.68% (17) from other races, and 1.19% (30) from two or more races. Hispanic or Latino of any race were 3.78% (95) of the population.

Of the 950 households, 32.3% had children under the age of 18; 56.1% were married couples living together; 10.3% had a female householder with no husband present and 28.9% were non-families. Of all households, 22.6% were made up of individuals and 9.4% had someone living alone who was 65 years of age or older. The average household size was 2.63 and the average family size was 3.13.

24.0% of the population were under the age of 18, 7.4% from 18 to 24, 25.2% from 25 to 44, 31.0% from 45 to 64, and 12.4% who were 65 years of age or older. The median age was 41.1 years. For every 100 females, the population had 94.7 males. For every 100 females ages 18 and older there were 93.7 males.

The Census Bureau's 2006–2010 American Community Survey showed that (in 2010 inflation-adjusted dollars) median household income was $66,268 (with a margin of error of ± $3,864) and the median family income was $76,186 (± $8,432). Males had a median income of $56,731 (± $11,282) versus $36,816 (± $5,060) for females. The per capita income for the borough was $29,948 (± $2,220). About 1.5% of families and 3.3% of the population were below the poverty line, including 3.6% of those under age 18 and 5.2% of those age 65 or over.

=== 2000 census ===
As of the 2000 United States census, there were 2,307 people, 886 households, and 618 families residing in the township. The population density was 388.7 inhabitants per square mile (150.1/km^{2}). There were 938 housing units at an average density of 158.0 per square mile (61.0/km^{2}). The racial makeup of the township was 96.58% White, 1.21% African American, 0.22% Native American, 0.52% Asian, 0.65% from other races, and 0.82% from two or more races. Hispanic or Latino of any race were 3.47% of the population.

There were 886 households, out of which 37.0% had children under the age of 18 living with them, 58.1% were married couples living together, 6.7% had a female householder with no husband present, and 30.2% were non-families. 26.3% of all households were made up of individuals, and 12.1% had someone living alone who was 65 years of age or older. The average household size was 2.60 and the average family size was 3.18.

In the township the population was spread out, with 27.5% under the age of 18, 5.0% from 18 to 24, 35.9% from 25 to 44, 20.3% from 45 to 64, and 11.3% who were 65 years of age or older. The median age was 36 years. For every 100 females, there were 97.2 males. For every 100 females age 18 and over, there were 95.0 males.

The median income for a household in the township was $53,359, and the median income for a family was $63,750. Males had a median income of $45,667 versus $31,210 for females. The per capita income for the township was $23,515. About 2.6% of families and 4.0% of the population were below the poverty line, including 2.1% of those under age 18 and 7.9% of those age 65 or over.

== Government ==
=== Local government ===
Oxford Township is governed under the Township form of New Jersey municipal government, one of 141 municipalities (of the 564) statewide that use this form, the second-most commonly used form of government in the state. The Township Committee is comprised of three members, who are elected directly by the voters at-large in partisan elections to serve three-year terms of office on a staggered basis, with one seat coming up for election each year as part of the November general election in a three-year cycle. At an annual reorganization meeting held during the first week of January, the Township Committee selects one of its members to serve as Mayor and another to serve as Deputy Mayor.

As of 2022, members of the Oxford Township Committee are Mayor Gerald S. Norton (R, term on committee ends December 31, 2024; term as mayor ends 2022), Deputy Mayor Georgette Miller (R, term on committee and as deputy mayor ends 2022) and Linda Koufodonetes (R, 2023; elected to serve an unexpired term).

In August 2021, the committee selected Linda Koufodontes to fill the vacant seat expiring in December 2023 that had been held by Robert Nyland until he resigned from office. Koufodontes served on an interim basis until the November 2021 general election, when she was chosen to serve the balance of the term of office.

After committee member Keith Gibbons resigned in July 2014 in the wake of harassment claims, Mayor Jade White and committee member Jim Williams resigned in August 2014 after realizing that Williams should have been up for election the previous November following his appointment to office. This left the township with no serving council members. In September 2014, Governor Chris Christie appointed Democrat Bill Bray and Republicans Marck Pasquini and Bill Ryan to fill the three vacant seats on an interim basis until the November 2014 general election, with the committee selecting Pasquini as mayor and Ryan as deputy mayor. In the November 2014 general election, Ryan was elected to serve the balance of the term expiring in December 2016.

=== Federal, state, and county representation ===
Oxford Township is located in the 7th Congressional District and is part of New Jersey's 23rd state legislative district.

For the 119th United States Congress, New Jersey's 7th congressional district is represented by Thomas Kean Jr. (R, Westfield). New Jersey is represented in the United States Senate by Democrats Cory Booker (Newark, term ends 2027) and Andy Kim (Moorestown, term ends 2031).

For the 2026–2027 session, the 23rd legislative district of the New Jersey Legislature is represented in the State Senate by Doug Steinhardt (R, Lopatcong Township) and in the General Assembly by John DiMaio (R, Hackettstown) and Erik Peterson (R, Franklin Township).

Warren County is governed by a three-member Board of County Commissioners, who are chosen at-large on a staggered basis in partisan elections with one seat coming up for election each year as part of the November general election. At an annual reorganization meeting held in the beginning of January, the board selects one of its members to serve as Commissioner Director and other as Deputy Director. As of 2025, Warren County's Commissioners are:

Deputy Director Jason J. Sarnoski (R, Lopatcong Township; 2025), Lori Ciesla (R, Lopatcong Township; 2026), and Director James R. Kern III (R, Pohatcong Township; 2027).

Constitutional officers of Warren County are: Clerk Holly Mackey (R, Alpha; 2027), Sheriff James McDonald Sr. (R, Phillipsburg; 2025) and Surrogate Michael J. Doherty (R, Washington; 2025).

=== Politics ===
As of March 2011, there were a total of 1,464 registered voters in Oxford Township, of which 338 (23.1% vs. 21.5% countywide) were registered as Democrats, 555 (37.9% vs. 35.3%) were registered as Republicans and 569 (38.9% vs. 43.1%) were registered as Unaffiliated. There were two voters registered as either Libertarians or Greens. Among the township's 2010 Census population, 58.2% (vs. 62.3% in Warren County) were registered to vote, including 76.6% of those ages 18 and over (vs. 81.5% countywide).

Gubernatorial election results for Oxford Township
Year	Republican		Democratic		Third party(ies)	
Year	No.	%	No.	%	No.	%
2025	642	64.65%	345	34.74%	6	0.60%
2021	590	71.52%	225	27.27%	10	1.21%
2017	416	66.56%	187	29.92%	22	3.52%
2013	514	73.64%	169	24.21%	15	2.15%
2009	503	64.99%	176	22.74%	95	12.27%
2005	464	60.42%	258	33.59%	46	5.99%

In the 2012 presidential election, Republican Mitt Romney received 591 votes (57.4% vs. 56.0% countywide), ahead of Democrat Barack Obama with 403 votes (39.1% vs. 40.8%) and other candidates with 20 votes (1.9% vs. 1.7%), among the 1,030 ballots cast by the township's 1,495 registered voters, for a turnout of 68.9% (vs. 66.7% in Warren County). In the 2008 presidential election, Republican John McCain received 662 votes (58.0% vs. 55.2% countywide), ahead of Democrat Barack Obama with 417 votes (36.5% vs. 41.4%) and other candidates with 22 votes (1.9% vs. 1.6%), among the 1,142 ballots cast by the township's 1,517 registered voters, for a turnout of 75.3% (vs. 73.4% in Warren County). In the 2004 presidential election, Republican George W. Bush received 698 votes (63.1% vs. 61.0% countywide), ahead of Democrat John Kerry with 379 votes (34.3% vs. 37.2%) and other candidates with 19 votes (1.7% vs. 1.3%), among the 1,106 ballots cast by the township's 1,443 registered voters, for a turnout of 76.6% (vs. 76.3% in the whole county).

United States presidential election results for Oxford Township
Year	Republican		Democratic		Third party(ies)	
Year	No.	%	No.	%	No.	%
2024	878	65.67%	439	32.83%	20	1.50%
2020	852	65.14%	438	33.49%	18	1.38%
2016	763	66.87%	329	28.83%	49	4.29%
2012	591	58.28%	403	39.74%	20	1.97%
2008	662	60.13%	417	37.87%	22	2.00%
2004	698	63.69%	379	34.58%	19	1.73%

In the 2013 gubernatorial election, Republican Chris Christie received 73.6% of the vote (514 cast), ahead of Democrat Barbara Buono with 24.2% (169 votes), and other candidates with 2.1% (15 votes), among the 725 ballots cast by the township's 1,516 registered voters (27 ballots were spoiled), for a turnout of 47.8%. In the 2009 gubernatorial election, Republican Chris Christie received 503 votes (64.0% vs. 61.3% countywide), ahead of Democrat Jon Corzine with 176 votes (22.4% vs. 25.7%), Independent Chris Daggett with 83 votes (10.6% vs. 9.8%) and other candidates with 12 votes (1.5% vs. 1.5%), among the 786 ballots cast by the township's 1,468 registered voters, yielding a 53.5% turnout (vs. 49.6% in the county).

United States Senate election results for Oxford Township1
Year	Republican		Democratic		Third party(ies)	
Year	No.	%	No.	%	No.	%
2024	841	64.35%	435	33.28%	31	2.37%
2018	560	64.97%	263	30.51%	39	4.52%
2012	558	58.00%	376	39.09%	28	2.91%
2006	378	63.85%	180	30.41%	34	5.74%

United States Senate election results for Oxford Township2
Year	Republican		Democratic		Third party(ies)	
Year	No.	%	No.	%	No.	%
2020	823	64.45%	415	32.50%	39	3.05%
2014	346	60.60%	205	35.90%	20	3.50%
2013	239	64.25%	124	33.33%	9	2.42%
2008	630	61.05%	380	36.82%	22	2.13%

== Education ==
The Oxford Township School District serves public school students in pre-kindergarten through eighth grade at Oxford Central School. As of the 2018–19 school year, the district, comprised of one school, had an enrollment of 275 students and 30.0 classroom teachers (on an FTE basis), for a student–teacher ratio of 9.2:1.

Public school students in ninth through twelfth grades are served by the Warren Hills Regional School District, which is a district for grades 7–12 that also serves students from the municipalities of Franklin Township, Mansfield Township, Washington Borough and Washington Township, with students from Oxford Township attending on a tuition basis as part of a sending/receiving relationship. Schools in the district (with 2018–19 enrollment data from the National Center for Education Statistics) are Warren Hills Regional Middle School with 542 students in grades 7 and 8 (located in Washington Borough) and Warren Hills Regional High School with 1,205 students in grades 9–12 (located in Washington Township).

Students from the township and from all of Warren County are eligible to attend Ridge and Valley Charter School in Frelinghuysen Township (for grades K–8) or Warren County Technical School in Washington borough (for 9–12), with special education services provided by local districts supplemented throughout the county by the Warren County Special Services School District in Oxford Township (for Pre-K–12).

== Transportation ==
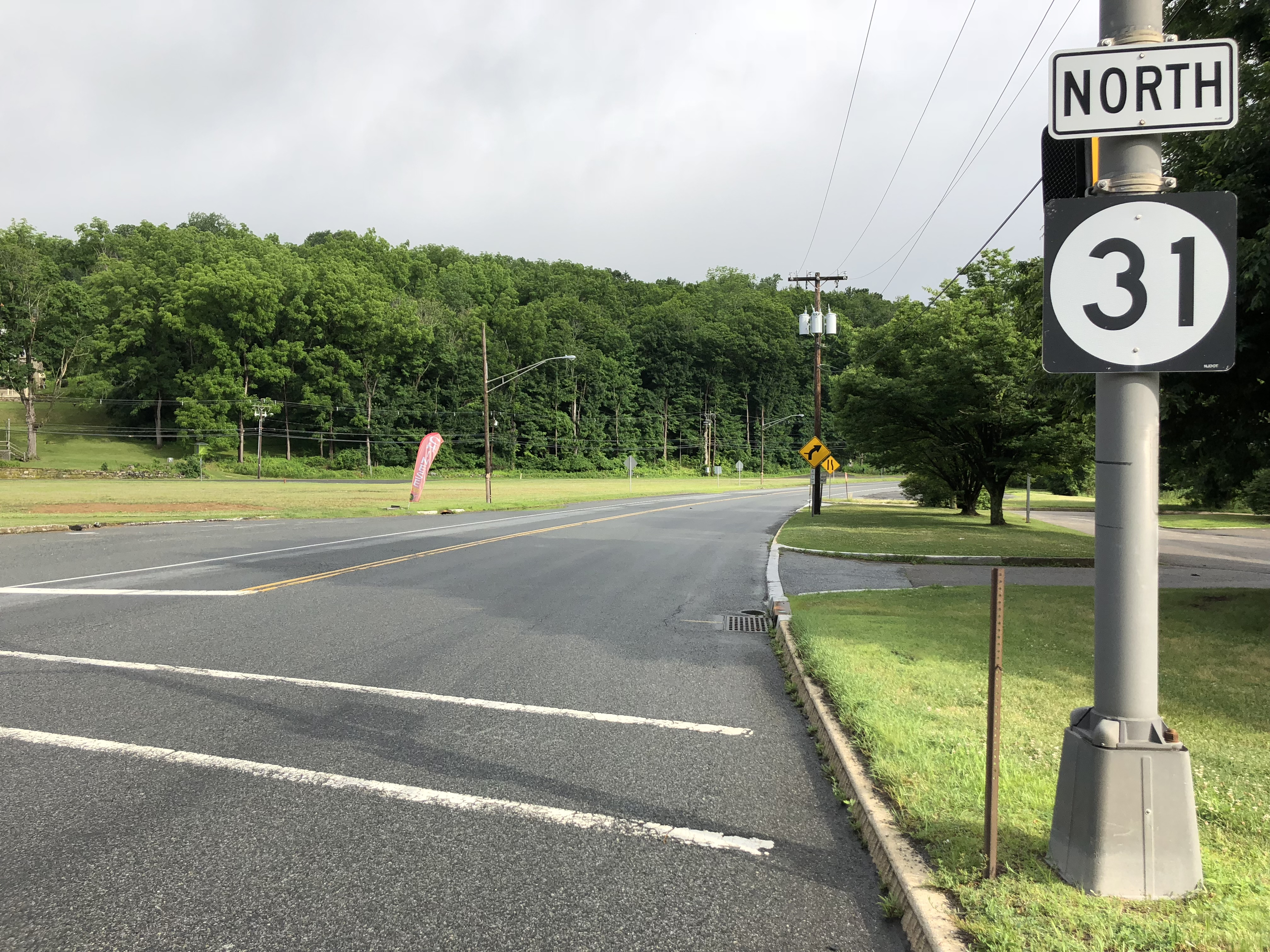
View north along Route 31 in Oxford Township

As of May 2010, the township had a total of 21.69 miles (34.91 km) of roadways, of which 13.02 miles (20.95 km) were maintained by the municipality, 6.47 miles (10.41 km) by Warren County and 2.20 miles (3.54 km) by the New Jersey Department of Transportation.

The main road that passes through is Route 31.

The closest limited access roads (Interstate 78 and Interstate 80) are at least 20 minutes away.

== Notable people ==
People who were born in, residents of, or otherwise closely associated with Oxford Township include:

- Kirk Alyn (1910–1999), actor best known for being the first actor to play the DC Comics character Superman, appearing on screen in the 1948 film serial Superman, and its 1950 sequel Atom Man vs. Superman
- Keith Jarrett (born 1945), jazz pianist and composer
- George M. Robeson (1829–1897), Union Army general during the American Civil War, and United States Secretary of the Navy during the Grant administration

== Points of interest ==
- Oxford Furnace
- Shippen Manor
