= Jenny Jump =

Jenny Jump can refer to:

- Jenny Jump, the heroine of some "Wizard of Oz" spin-off books.
- Jenny Jump State Forest in Warren County, New Jersey.
- Jenny Jump Mountain, a mountain in Warren County, New Jersey.
