= Townsbury, New Jersey =

Populated place in Warren County, New Jersey, US

- Unincorporated community
- Location of Townsbury in Warren County. Inset: Location of Warren County within the state of New Jersey Townsbury, New Jersey (New Jersey) Townsbury, New Jersey (the United States)
- Coordinates: 40°51′03″N 74°56′01″W
- Country: United States
- State: New Jersey
- County: Warren
- Township: Liberty
- Named after: Benjamin and John Town
- Elevation: 515 ft (157 m)
- Time zone: UTC−05:00 (Eastern (EST))
  - Summer (DST): UTC−04:00 (EDT)
- GNIS feature ID: 881225

Townsbury is an unincorporated community located within Liberty Township in Warren County, in the U.S. state of New Jersey.

Townsbury is located on U.S. Route 46, approximately 12 mi (19 km) west of Hackettstown. The Pequest River flows through the settlement.

== History ==
The settlement was first called "Meng's Mill", named for John Meng, an early settler who established a grist mill here. In the 1780s, the mill was owned by Benjamin Town and John Town, the settlement's namesake.

By 1882, Townsbury had a post office, grist mill, lumber mill, and a "good local trade". The population was 102.

A line of the Lehigh and Hudson River Railway passed through Townsbury. The abandoned railbed now forms the Pequest Wildlife Management Area Trail, a recreational rail trail between Townsbury and Buttzville.
