= Lake Shawnee (New Jersey) =

Reservoir in Jefferson Township, New Jersey

- Location within New Jersey Location within the United States
- Location: Jefferson Township, New Jersey
- Coordinates: 40°58′10″N 074°35′48″W
- Type: Reservoir
- Primary outflows: Beaver Brook
- Basin countries: United States
- Surface area: 83 acres (34 ha)
- Average depth: 5 ft (1.5 m)
- Surface elevation: 928 ft (283 m)

Lake Shawnee is a small 83-acre (34 ha) private lake in Jefferson Township, New Jersey, United States. Its outsourcing is Beaver Brook, which flows into Lake Hopatcong, New Jersey's largest lake. Lake Shawnee and its watershed are the headwaters of the Musconetcong River watershed.

The Lake Shawnee Reservation, as it is known, was developed in 1946 by the Arthur D. Crane Company of Sparta, real estate developers, which incorporated the Lake Shawnee Club and began selling home sites on the Lake many of which were originally summer homes. By 1948, the first two homes were built and during the next 15 years the Club reached its peak of 562 resident members. The clubhouse was then constructed and First Beach, not included in the original deeds, was subsequently purchased from the Crane Company with funds raised from within the membership. Carl Peterson was instrumental in developing the Third Beach area and was known as Mr. Shawnee among local residents.

The Lake Shawnee dam was damaged during a storm in March 2010. The dam had already been under pressure by a snowy winter, causing rising water levels.

In 2016, there was an effort to change the mailing address from a Wharton, New Jersey, 07885 ZIP code, to a Lake Hopatcong 07849 ZIP code. The effort was narrowly defeated. In 2026, a new effort will be made to change the mailing address ZIP code to 07849.
