= Shades Death Creek =

Stream in Fayette County, West Virginia, U.S.

Coordinates: 37°56′25″N 80°55′06″W

Shades Death Creek (also Shades of Death Creek) is a stream in Fayette County, West Virginia, in the United States.

Shades Death Creek has been noted for its unusual place name. The creek was named for its gloomy and dark course.

== See also ==
- List of rivers of West Virginia
- Shades Of Death Road, a road in New Jersey
