= Edwin Kaprat =

American serial killer (1964–1995)

- Born: Edwin Bernard Kaprat III; September 21, 1964; New York City, New York, U.S.
- Died: April 19, 1995 (aged 30); Florida State Prison, Raiford, Florida, U.S.
- Cause of death: Stab wounds
- Other names: "The Granny Killer" "Mike"
- Status: Deceased
- Conviction: First degree murder (2 counts)
- Penalty: Death

Details
- Victims: 6
- Span of crimes: August 1991 – September 1993
- Country: United States
- State: Florida
- Date apprehended: October 8, 1993

Edwin Bernard Kaprat III (September 21, 1964 – April 19, 1995), known as The Granny Killer, was an American serial killer, rapist, and arsonist who committed six murders in Tampa and Hernando County, Florida from 1991 to 1993, with a majority of his victims being elderly women. Convicted for two of the killings and sentenced to death, he and another inmate were stabbed to death during a dispute in prison.

== Early life ==
Edwin Bernard Kaprat III was born on September 21, 1964, in New York City, New York, one of two children born to refrigeration mechanic Edwin "Skip" Kaprat Jr. and his wife Ruth, a real estate agent. The family moved to the Great Meadows section of Independence Township, New Jersey when he was still young, and according to neighbors, they were considered to be upstanding citizens. Although described as intelligent and obsessed with reading books, Kaprat, who was nicknamed "Mike" by family members, was also known to be a very violent and easily angered bully who would attack those weaker and smaller than him. Due to this, his teachers resorted to giving him plush toys so he could redirect his anger to them, punching and kicking them. He reportedly started drinking at age 12 and developed an addiction to alcohol, which landed him in juvenile treatment centers and juvenile courts on numerous occasions.

After his 16th birthday, Kaprat dropped out of the Hackettstown High School, and in November 1982, he married his pregnant girlfriend, Nora Niederhaus. Even after the birth of his two sons, Kaprat continued to drink and smoke marijuana. By that time, the Kaprat family were facing some strife, as the elder Kaprats divorced and their daughter, Ruthie, experienced marital problems with her husband threatening to torch her car. Despite his hot temper, Kaprat was well-liked by his family and relatives, and was noted for his interest in the Middle Ages and Dungeons & Dragons. In October 1990, he and his wife moved to his parents' home in Spring Hill, Florida, where they planned to start a new life with their children.

== Murders ==
=== Murder of Lee Bugay ===
On February 22, 1991, the body of 27-year-old Lee Anthony Bugay III was found in a mangrove near the Courtney Campbell Causeway in Tampa by a man who had been sunbathing. Bugay had been reported missing the previous morning, and injuries on his head indicated that he had been beaten to death with either a tire iron or a pipe. His vehicle was later found at a nearby boat ramp, and investigators took plaster casts of footprints and tire tracks found near the crime scene in the hopes of finding clues that would let them catch the killer.

Just hours after Bugay's body was found, authorities were notified that someone had purchased gasoline from a Texaco store using his credit card. Upon further investigation of this clue, they identified the man as Kaprat, who by then had returned to New Jersey. In early March, after learning that an arrest warrant had been issued for him, Kaprat called a detective in the Hackettstown Police Department and expressed his desire to turn himself in. On March 9, Kaprat surrendered himself to authorities, and soon after extradited back to Florida to charges of first-degree murder, armed robbery and forgery.

Before being put on trial, investigators attempted to link Kaprat with an unrelated arson attack on another man committed the day after Bugay's murder, but could not charge him due to a lack of evidence. At the trial itself, it was determined that Kaprat's confession was not overtly reliable, and he was thusly convicted on the forgery charge and dealing in stolen property. He was then placed under house arrest at his parents' home in Hernando County, but was later arrested for violating it and was imprisoned until May 7, 1993. By that time, his wife had divorced him due to his aggressive behavior towards their children and his volatile temper (which she believed was a projection of his own alleged physical abuse as a child), and he had dropped out of the Hillsborough Community College. After his release, Kaprat wrote a letter to his attorney in New Jersey, alleging that his eldest son had attempted to kill his younger brother and had sexually molested his mother, but these allegations could not be substantiated.

After his release, Kaprat started work as a machinist at the Padgett-Swann Machinery Company, which allowed him to commute between Hudson and Spring Hill.

=== Hernando County murders ===
On August 7, 1993, a fire broke out at the Spring Hill home of 80-year-old Sophia Francis Garrity, a retired public relations employee from New Jersey who lived by herself. By the time the firemen had arrived to extinguish the flames, she had perished in the blaze. The incident came as a shock to the community, as Garrity, affectionately called "The Cookie Lady", was well-liked and respected by everyone. The starting point of the fire was determined to be an electrical malfunction in Garrity's bedroom, with the fire being spread by her bedroom fan. Due to the circumstances, it was ruled as accidental and Garrity's death was also ruled as such.

Ten days later, 84-year-old William "Bill" Whitney and his 83-year-old spouse Alice were found beaten up at their home in Spring Hil after a neighbor heard Bill screaming and the couple's smoke detector going off. Upon arriving at the scene, firefighters took care of the fire, which had been set in the home but had failed to spread before it was put out. Both Whitneys were transported to Bayfront Health St. Petersburg, but because Bill had been severely injured, and Alice suffered from Alzheimer's disease, they were unable to provide any useful testimony that could identify their assailant. This was further complicated by the apparent lack of a weapon or motive, which left the authorities at a standstill.

The day after, another fire was reported in the nearby community of Brookridge, which resulted in the death of 70-year-old Ruth Goldsmith, a retiree who had moved to the area from Havertown, Pennsylvania just two years prior. The fire caused an estimated $65,000 in damage, completely destroying the mobile home in the process. An investigation into the matter determined that the cause was likely an electrical short in the master bedroom, and the case was subsequently dismissed as accidental.

In the weeks following Goldsmith's death, a number of elderly women living in the area began receiving harassing phone calls from what was thought to be the same caller. On September 2, yet another fire erupted in Brookridge, this time at the mobile home of 79-year-old Lydia Riddell, a retired food store manager from Media, Pennsylvania and a friend of Goldsmith's. Upon investigating the home, police found her charred body inside, which had been bound with duct tape and showed signs of sexual assault. Riddell's death was labeled a homicide, and due to the suspicious frequency of violent crimes in the area, authorities announced that they would be reviewing the Goldsmith case to see whether it was related to this incident or not.

The final incident occurred on September 26, when 87-year-old Lorraine "Alice" Burnham Dawe, a retired athlete, was found beaten to death at her mobile home in Spring Hill. Authorities determined that she had been sexually assaulted and killed after her assailant had repeatedly stomped on her neck. Because she had been buried under a stack of bedding and pillows which were then set on fire, it was determined that the killer likely attempted to burn the home down, but the fire had failed to spread. With the announcement of yet another death of an elderly woman in the area, the FBI was called in to help the investigators as suspicions began to arise that there was a serial killer in the area. Local residents started reinforcing their door locks and arming themselves should they be the next target.

== Arrest and investigation ==
A few days after Dawe's death, an anonymous tipster phoned the police and suggested that they investigate Kaprat, a previously convicted felon who had been charged with a murder two years prior. To the investigators' surprise, his fingerprints matched those found on a garage window at Dawe's house, which was close to his sister's house. However, as they had insufficient evidence for an arrest, Kaprat was instead put under 24-hour surveillance while detectives continued to search for any ties to the other killings. To do so, an undercover officer was dispatched to give him a lift to his parents' house, and during the trip, Kaprat complained that his girlfriend was furious at him for having a strange bite mark on his neck. This, coupled with the fact that multiple cigarette butts were found at the crime scenes, allowed authorities to gather enough evidence to link him to the murders.

By October 8, an arrest warrant was issued for him, as well as search warrants for his place of residence, car and samples of his pubic hair. Kaprat was arrested near his parents' home that very same day, and on the following morning, he confessed to the crimes. In his testimony concerning the Dawe murder, Kaprat claimed that he thought she was having a heart attack after the rape and had stomped on her to "put her out of her misery." As a result, he was charged with four counts of murder; two counts of attempted murder; four counts of sexual battery; six counts of residential burglary involving battery; five counts of arson and one count of robbery. The news of his arrest sparked renewed interest in the Bugay murder as authorities now believed that Kaprat would be willing to properly confess to it.

On November 19, William Whitney, who had been left in a vegetative state following the attack, died at his son's home in Hancock County, Mississippi from a bout of pneumonia. As his death was thought to be directly linked to the attack committed by Kaprat, prosecutors considered charging him with first-degree murder in the case.

=== Trial ===
In January 1995, Kaprat's trial for the murder of Riddell began. From the very beginning, it was closely monitored by residents of Hernando County due to its high-profile nature and the viciousness of the crimes, which were described as the worst in the county's history. After being ruled sober and sane at the time of the crimes, Kaprat was charged with first-degree murder. During the proceedings, a tape-recorded interview between Kaprat and a detective was played which showed that Kaprat had repeatedly asked for the interview to be stopped so he could smoke a cigarette. In it, the detective repeatedly shouted at him and called him a liar, which Kaprat's attorney argued was tantamount to coercion; on the other hand, prosecutors excused it by pointing out that the detective was simply calling him out on his lies.

After a ten-day trial, Kaprat was found guilty of the murder after the jury deliberated for eight hours. They subsequently recommended a death sentence, and after the trial ended, Kaprat was ordered to stand trial for the murder of Dawe. Not long after, he was additionally convicted of her murder as well, with the jury in that case also recommending a death sentence. Throughout both proceedings, Kaprat expressed no interest in the proceedings and reportedly spent most of the time reading a book. His family members unsuccessfully pleaded with jurors to spare him the second death sentence, saying that Kaprat had told detectives that he would like them to shoot him, and that he had slashed one of his wrists on the eve of his first trial.

== Death ==
On April 19, 1995, Kaprat and another inmate, Charles Street, were both stabbed to death by two fellow inmates at the Florida State Prison's death row. The murders were the first ever to occur on death row. Kaprat's death was met with relief from the victims' family members, most of whom said that he deserved what he got. At the same time, they expressed their condolences to his own family members. As a result of his death, the charges in the remaining cases were dropped and they were officially closed. Street had been on death row for the 1988 murders of Metro-Dade Police Officers Richard Boles and David Strzalkowski.

The two inmates responsible for the murders, Mario Lara and Rigoberto Sanchez-Velasco, were convicted of two counts of third degree murder. After waiving his appeals, Sanchez-Velasco was executed for his respective crime in 2002, while Lara's sentence was later reduced to life imprisonment and he remains in prison. The crime in which Sanchez-Velasco was originally sentenced to death for was the 1986 murder of 11-year-old Katixa "Kathy" Ecanarro. As for Lara, his original death sentence was for the 1981 murders of Grisel Fumero and Olga Elviro.

== See also ==
- Capital punishment in Florida
- Crime in Florida
- List of serial killers in the United States

== Bibliography ==
- Louis R. Mizell (September 1994). Street Sense for Seniors. Penguin Publishing Group. ISBN 0425143643.
- Steven A. Egger (July 24, 2001). The Killers Among Us: Examination Of Serial Murder And Its Investigations. Pearson. ISBN 0130179159.
