= Pequest River =

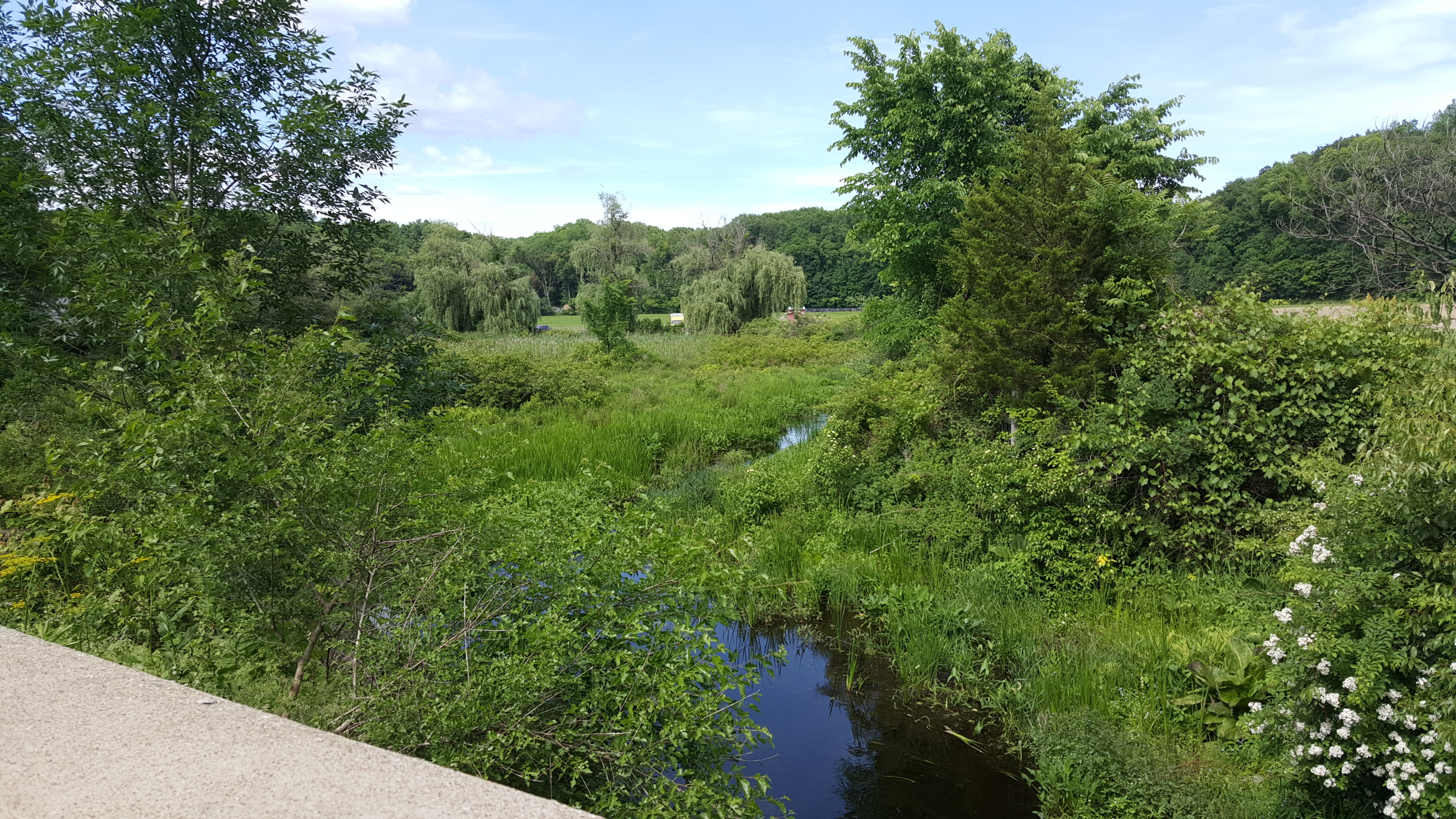
- Headwaters of the Pequest near Springdale, in Andover Township, New Jersey

Location
- Country: United States of America

Physical characteristics
- Source
  - location: Stickles Pond, Newton, New Jersey
  - coordinates: 41°01′50″N 74°45′12″W
  - elevation: 668 feet (204 m)
- Mouth
  - location: Delaware River at Belvidere, New Jersey
  - coordinates: 40°49′44″N 75°04′59″W
- Length: 35.7 mi (57.5 km)
- Basin size: 162.62 mi^{2} (421.2 km^{2})
- Discharge
  - average: ? at Blairstown, New Jersey

The Pequest River is a 35.7-mile-long (57.5 km) tributary of the Delaware River in the Skylands Region in northwestern New Jersey in the United States.

The Pequest, Native American for "open land," drains an area of 162.62 square miles (421.2 km^{2}) across Sussex and Warren counties, consisting of ten municipalities.

== Course ==
The Pequest starts at Stickles Pond, Newton in Sussex County and flows southward through Springdale and Huntsville, about 3.5 miles (5.6 km), where it starts to turn southwest. It passes through a tunnel under the Pequest Fill, built in 1911 by the Delaware, Lackawanna, and Western Railroad as part of the mammoth Lackawanna Cut-Off project.

Flowing through Tranquility, it runs along the northwestern side of the Allamuchy Mountain ridge near Allamuchy, where it meets Trout Brook.

It now joins Bear Creek in Bear Swamp and passes through the reclaimed swampy area known as the Great Meadows, lying between the ridges of Jenny Jump Mountain and Cat Swamp Mountain. Shades Of Death Road runs along the foot of Jenny Jump Mountain on the north side of the valley here. Some of the land here was drained for cultivation by excavation and clearing of the Pequest and its tributaries. It exits the Great Meadows in a long loop through the gap between Cat Swamp Mountain and Danville Mountain and resumes its course along the southeastern side of Mount Mohepinoke, entering the Pequest Wildlife Management Area. Furnace Brook empties into it as it descends into a small gorge cut between Mt. Mohepinoke and an outlying spur of the Scotts Mountain massif. It turns west, and Mountain Lake Brook enters the stream just above Buttzville, where it exists the Pequest WMA. It passes west through Bridgeville, turns slightly towards the north, and meets Beaver Brook as it turns southwest again. It tumbles down to Belvidere in a series of falls, where it meets the Delaware River.

== Tributaries ==
- Beaver Brook
- Mountain Lake Brook
- Furnace Brook
- Bear Creek
- Trout Brook

== See also ==
- List of rivers of New Jersey

== Background resources ==
=== Books, monographs, and other references ===
- Armstrong, William C. Pioneer Families of Northwestern New Jersey (Lambertville, New Jersey: Hunterdon House, 1979).
- Cawley, James S. and Cawley, Margaret. Exploring the Little Rivers of New Jersey (New Brunswick, New Jersey: Rutgers University Press, 1942, 1961, 1971, 1993). ISBN 0-8135-0684-0
- Chambers, Theodore Frelinghuysen. The early Germans of New Jersey: Their History, Churches, and Genealogies (Dover, New Jersey, Dover Printing Company, 1895), passim.
- Cummings, Warren D. Sussex County: A History (Newton, New Jersey: Newton Rotary Club, 1964). NO ISBN
- Documents Relating to the Colonial, Revolutionary and Post-Revolutionary History of the State of New Jersey [Title Varies]. Archives of the State of New Jersey, 1st–2nd series. 47 volumes. (Newark, New Jersey: 1880–1949). NO ISBN
- Honeyman, A. Van Doren (ed.). Northwestern New Jersey—A History of Somerset, Morris, Hunterdon, Warren, and Sussex Counties Volume 1. (Lewis Historical Publishing Co., New York, 1927). NO ISBN
- Schrabisch, Max. Indian habitations in Sussex County, New Jersey Geological Survey of New Jersey, Bulletin No. 13. (Union Hill, New Jersey: Dispatch Printing Company, 1915). NO ISBN
- Schrabisch, Max. Archaeology of Warren and Hunterdon counties Geological Survey of New Jersey, Bulletin No. 18. (Trenton, N.J., MacCrellish and Quigley co., state printers, 1917). NO ISBN
- Snell, James P. History of Sussex and Warren Counties, New Jersey, With Illustrations and Biographical Sketches of Its Prominent Men and Pioneers. (Philadelphia: Everts & Peck, 1881). NO ISBN
- Stickney, Charles E. Old Sussex County families of the Minisink Region from articles in the Wantage Recorder (compiled by Virginia Alleman Brown) (Washington, N.J. : Genealogical Researchers, 1988)
