= Jenny Jump Mountain =

Mountain in New Jersey, United States

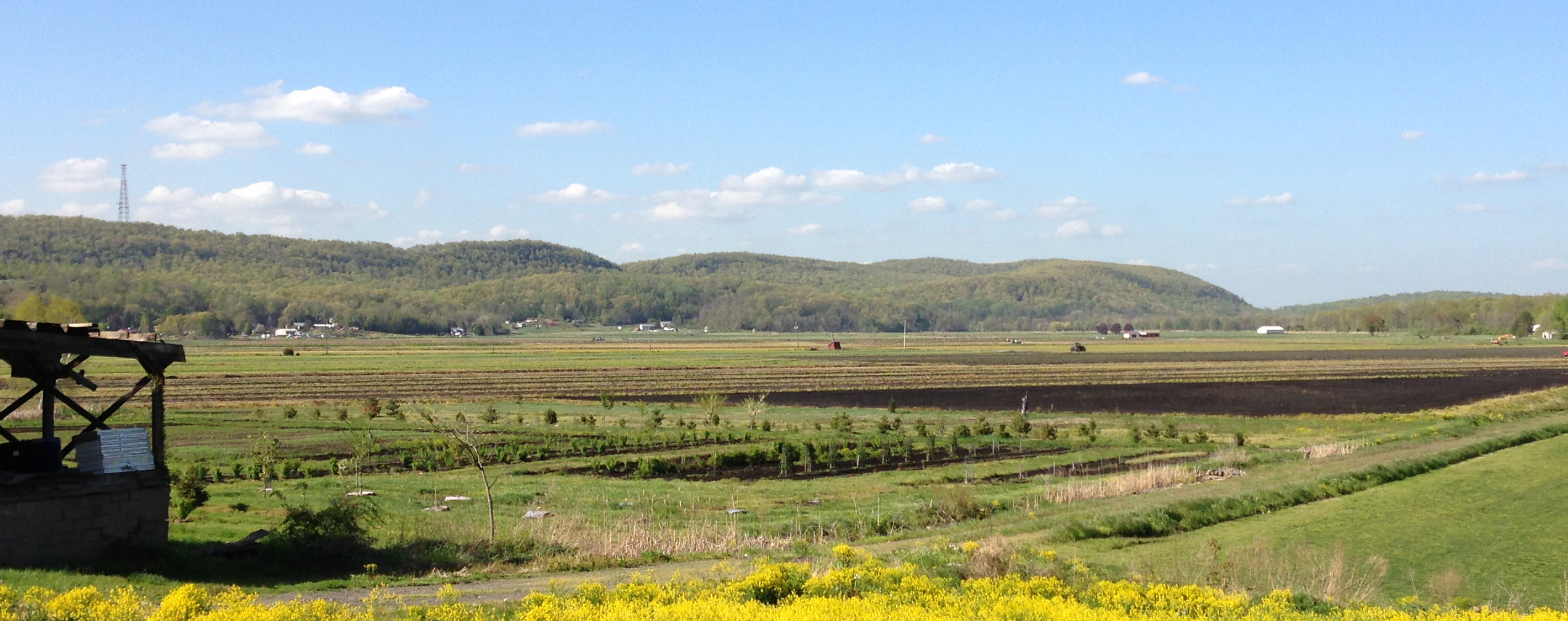

Highest point
- Elevation: 1,129 ft (344 m) NGVD 29
- Coordinates: 40°50′46″N 74°58′41″W

Geography
- Location: Warren County, New Jersey, U.S.
- Topo map: USGS Blairstown

Climbing
- Easiest route: Hiking

Jenny Jump Mountain is a mountain in Warren County, New Jersey. The summit rises to 1,129 feet (344 m); the mountain is within Frelinghuysen, Hope, Independence and Liberty Townships. It is part of the New York–New Jersey Highlands of the Appalachian Mountains, although somewhat isolated to the west of the main body of the Highlands.

Portions of Jenny Jump Mountain are within Jenny Jump State Forest.

== History ==
An 1834 description read,

Jenny Jump, a noted eminence in the northern part of Oxford t-ship, Warren co., extending N. E. and S. W. for about 10 miles, and into Independence t-ship.

== In popular culture ==
Children's author John R. Neill, who regularly illustrated the sequels to L. Frank Baum and Ruth Plumly Thompson's Wizard of Oz series, before taking over the writing himself, lived in New Jersey during his last years. He gave the name Jenny Jump to his signature character, an adventurous New Jersey girl who first appeared in The Wonder City of Oz (1940).
