= Shades of Death Road =

Road in New Jersey

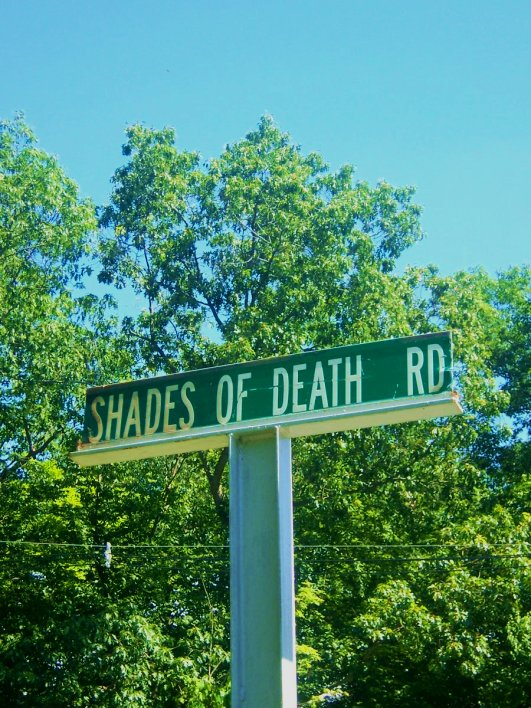
- Sign at southern end of Shades of Death Road, near Great Meadows, NJ
- Maintained by: Municipal governments
- Length: 6.7 mi (10.8 km)
- Location: Warren County, New Jersey, USA
- South end: CR 611 in Liberty Township
- North end: Long Bridge Road in Allamuchy Township

Other
- Known for: Legends of paranormal activity

Shades of Death Road is a two-lane rural road of about 6.7 miles (10.8 km) in length in central Warren County, New Jersey. It runs in a generally north–south direction through Liberty and Independence townships, then turns more east–west in Allamuchy Township north of the Interstate 80 (I-80) crossing. South of I-80 it runs alongside Jenny Jump State Forest and offers access to it at several points. The road is the subject of folklore and numerous local legends. In 2013, the SyFy channel's Haunted Highway series did a segment on the road.

According to Weird NJ, these rumors have drawn more visitors to the area, to the annoyance of residents, who have in the past gone so far as to smear the pole holding the street sign (pictured) at the road's southern end with grease or oil to prevent theft (Other signs along the road are in vertical type on poles and thus harder to remove and less desirable to display).

The road in New Jersey is not the only one with this unusual name. Another Shades of Death Road exists in Washington County, Pennsylvania north of Avella between Bethel Ridge Road and Cole School Road.

== Location and route ==
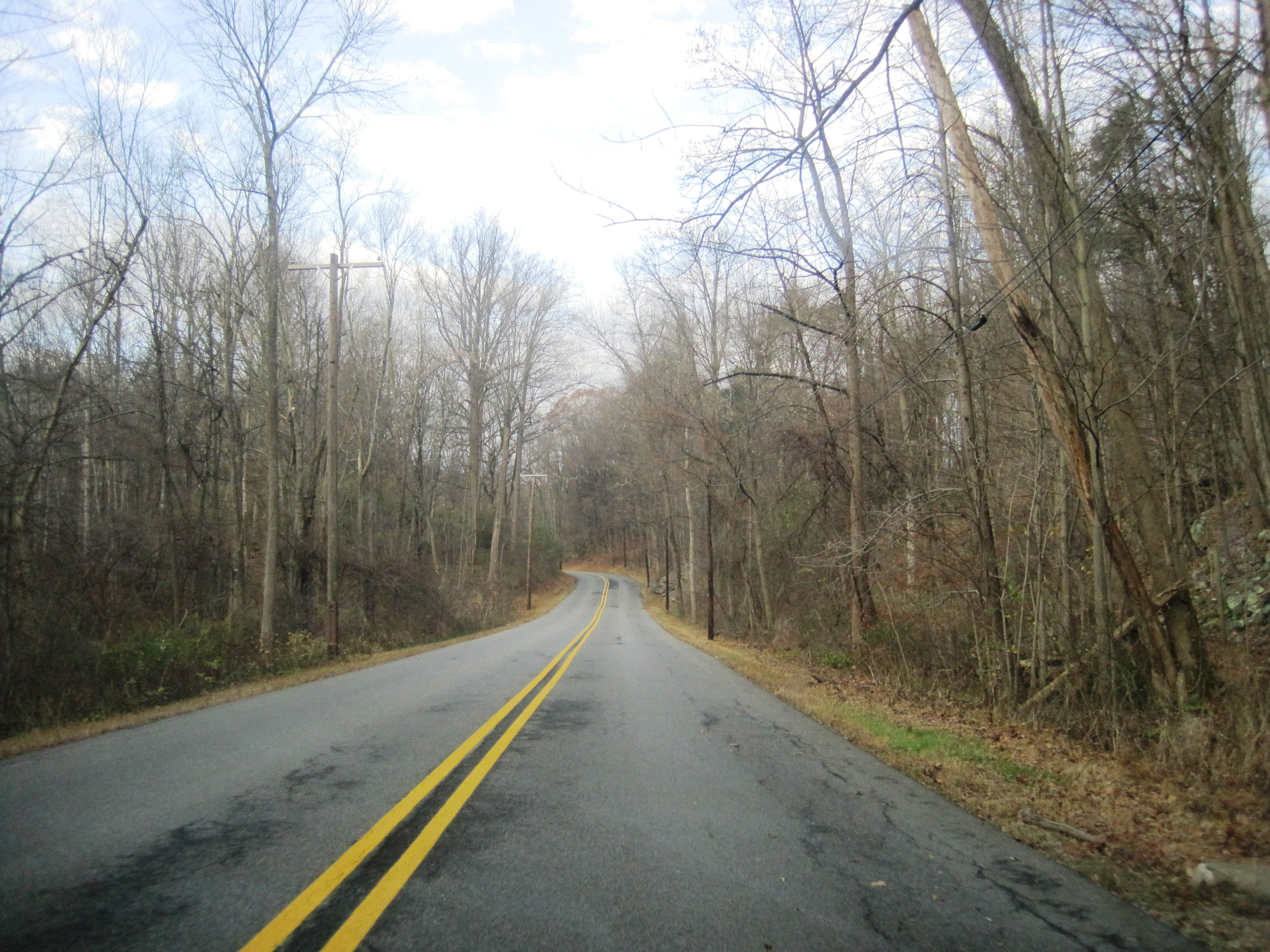
Shades of Death Road in Independence Township

Shades of Death's southern end is at County Route 611 (CR 611), or Hope Road, in Liberty Township one mile (1.6 km) north of the junction with CR 617 (Mountain Lake Road) and two miles (3.2 km) north of where Hope splits off from U.S. Route 46 (US 46) at Marble Hill, just west of Great Meadows. From that point it meanders along between the base of the Jenny Jump ridge and the low-lying flatlands of the Pequest River valley. About half a mile (almost 1 km) north of the interstate, in Allamuchy, it turns to the east and enters those flatlands, continuing all the while to weave back and forth through some sharp turns, until it reaches its northern terminus at Long Bridge Road.

== Legends and folklore ==
Weird NJ suggests several theories for the road's macabre name.

- Some focus on the road's southern half, where the adjoining forest with its aged trees provides much actual shade from the sun on even the brightest days. Highwaymen or other bandits would supposedly lay in wait for victims in these shadows, then often cut their throats after taking what they had, or they would engage in fights to the death among themselves over women.
- Or, it is said, the local populace would take revenge against these highwaymen by lynching them and leaving the bodies dangling from low-hanging tree branches as a warning to others criminally inclined.
- In the 1920s and 1930s, there were three brutal murders along the road, one was a robbery in which a man was hit over the head with a tire jack over some gold coins, a second in which a woman beheaded her husband and buried the head and the body on different sides of the street, and lastly one in which a local resident, Bill Cummins, was shot and buried in a mudpile. It was never solved.
- The twists and turns of the road have led to suggestions that it has led to an inordinate number of fatal car accidents, and supposedly the reflective guard rails along the road indicate where that has happened. However, the road had earned its name well before automobile use became common in the area.
- Bear Swamp nearby was known as either Cat Hollow or Cat Swamp, because of packs of vicious wild cats that lived there who frequently and lethally attacked travelers along the road.
- A final explanation points to the Pequest lowlands and nearby Bear Swamp, used today for sod farming. In 1850, malaria-carrying insects were discovered nesting in a cliff face along the road. They flourished in the nearby wetlands of Bear Swamp, causing annual outbreaks of the disease. The high mortality rates due to the remoteness of the area from effective medical treatment cut a swath through so many families that a street once called merely Shade or Shades Road due to its tree cover took on the name Shades Of Death out of black humor. The problem was so widespread, that in 1884 a state-sponsored project drained the swamps, ending the threat.

=== Reputed paranormal activity ===
According to Weird New Jersey, ghosts or other supernatural phenomena are said to have been reported at points along the road.

==== Ghost Lake ====
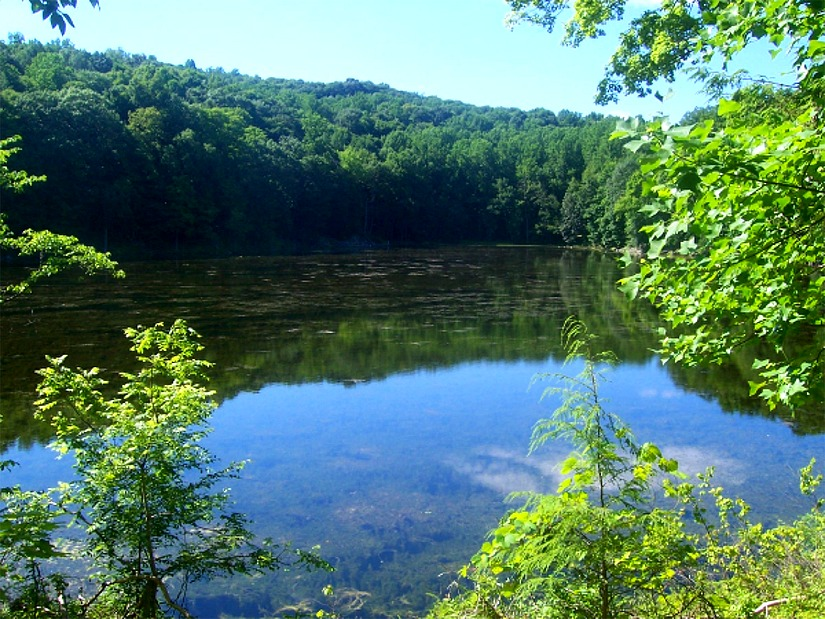
Ghost Lake

Ghost Lake (unnamed on U.S. Geological Survey maps) is just off the road, in the state forest south of the I-80 overpass. It was created in the early 20th century when two wealthy local men dammed a creek that ran through the narrow valley between houses they had just built. They gave it its name from the wraithlike vapor formations they often saw rising off it on cooler mornings. They further named the pass Haunted Hollow.

Weird NJ writes that visitors have told them that no matter what time of night they visit the lake at, the sky above it always seems as bright as if it were still twilight and several have reported ghosts in the area, especially in a deserted old cabin across the lake from the road, supposedly victims of the murders once believed to have given the road its name.

==== The Fairy Hole ====
To the right of Ghost lake, there is a small cave, once used by the Lenape. Weird NJ says that though the cave is now easily accessible, and also covered in graffiti, archaeologists who surveyed the area in 1918 found pottery shards, flint, and broken arrow heads. From their findings, the archaeologists concluded that "The Fairy Hole" was not often visited. It may have been used as a simple resting point for traveling or hunting Lenape, but with its close proximity to several known burial sites, it is said to be a sacred or religiously important site. This survey was conducted before the creation of Ghost Lake.

==== Lenape Lane ====
Lenape Lane is an unpaved one-lane dead-end street about three-quarter mile (1.1 km) in length running eastward off Shades just north of I-80. It ends at a farmhouse for which it is little more than a driveway, but halfway down there is space to park or turn around next to a wooden structure described as looking like an abandoned stable.

Weird New Jersey writes that visitors to this stable site at night have reported extremely local fogs surrounding it and seeing apparitions in it, or sometimes even in clear weather, and also claimed the air is sometimes unusually chilly, and feeling general unease in the area for no immediately apparent reason. An additional legend claims that sometimes nocturnal visitors to Lenape see an orb of white light appear near the end of the road which chases vehicles back out to Shades Of Death, and if it turns red in the process, those who see it will die. This may be due to an old tree near the end of Lenape that was never cut down when the road was built. As a result, the road forks right before the tree, and a big red reflector has been nailed to the tree to warn drivers. Another legend says that if one circles around the tree and drives down the road again at midnight, a red light will shine and the driver will never survive.

==== Others ====
There are some legends concerning a Native American spirit guide who supposedly takes the shape of a deer and appears at various points along the road at night. If drivers see him and do not slow down sufficiently enough to avoid a collision, they will soon get into a serious accident with a deer.

Another legend tells of a bridge where, if drivers stop past midnight with their high beams on and honk their horns three times, they will see the ghosts of two young children who were run over while playing in the road. This legend actually refers to a bridge over the Flatbrook on Old Mine Road, not far from Shades of Death. The bridge is no longer accessible by car as a newer, larger bridge has been built next to it. The original bridge can still be reached on foot.

==== Polaroids ====
Weird NJ published correspondence from two anonymous readers who said they found hundreds of Polaroid photographs, some of them showing the blurred image of a woman, possibly in distress, scattered in woods just off the road during the 1990s. The magazine claims the local police began an investigation but the photos "disappeared" shortly afterward.

== See also ==
- Haunted highway
- Clinton Road (New Jersey)
