= Bear Creek (New Jersey) =

American River

Coordinates: 40°58′38″N 74°51′54″W

Bear Creek is a 7.3-mile-long (11.7 km) tributary of the Pequest River in New Jersey in the United States.

== Crossings ==
These crossings exist from north to south:

- Shades Of Death Road
- Interstate 80

== See also ==
- List of rivers of New Jersey
