= Vienna, New Jersey =

Populated place in Warren County, New Jersey, US

- Census-designated place
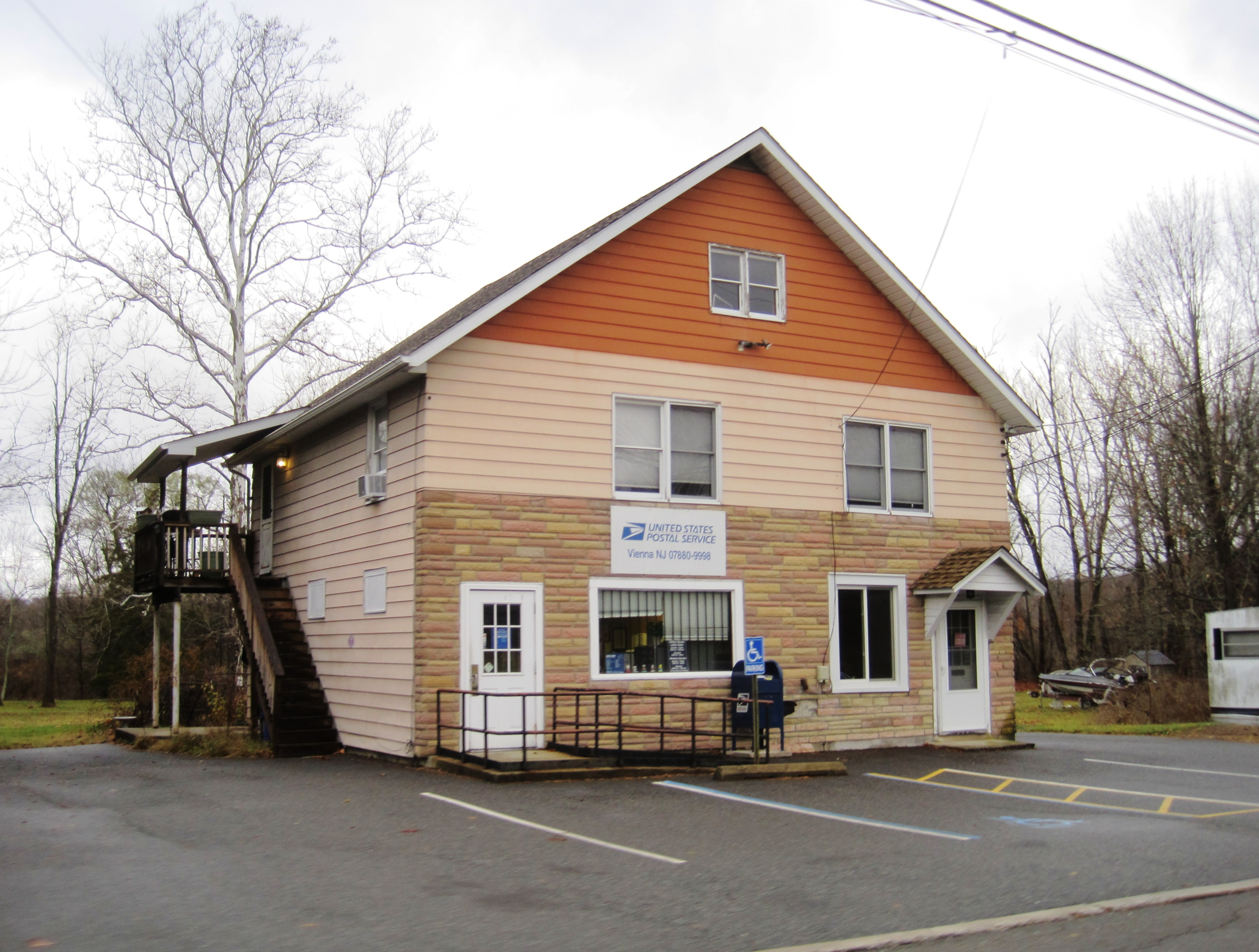
- Vienna post office

- Location in Warren County Location in New Jersey Location in the United States
- Coordinates: 40.872247°N 74.872519°W
- Country: United States
- State: New Jersey
- County: Warren
- Township: Independence
- Named after: Vienna, Austria

Area
  - Total: 2.93 sq mi (7.60 km^{2})
  - Land: 2.92 sq mi (7.57 km^{2})
  - Water: 0.012 sq mi (0.03 km^{2}) 0.38%
- Elevation: 630 ft (192 m)

Population (2020)
  - Total: 881
  - Density: 301.4/sq mi (116.39/km^{2})
- Time zone: UTC−05:00 (Eastern (EST))
  - Summer (DST): UTC−04:00 (EDT)
- ZIP Code: 07880
- Area code: 908
- FIPS code: 34-75950
- GNIS feature ID: 02584038

Vienna is an unincorporated community and census-designated place (CDP) located within Independence Township in Warren County, in the U.S. state of New Jersey, that was created as part of the 2010 United States census. As of the 2020 census, Vienna had a population of 881.

Through the 2000 United States census, the CDP was combined as part of Great Meadows-Vienna. Effective with the 2010 Census, the CDP was split into its two components, Great Meadows and Vienna.

== History ==
The settlement was first called "Cumminstown", named for the Cummins family, early settlers who had purchased land in the area in 1755 and remained in the area until 1880.

Around 1828, the settlement's name was changed to Vienna after the city in Austria, the home country of the Cummins family. A Christian church was organized in Vienna in 1839.

By 1882, the population had grown to 450, at which time Vienna had a post office, hotel, chair factory, foundry, and a "large local trade".

== Geography ==
According to the United States Census Bureau, the CDP had a total area of 2.933 square miles (7.598 km^{2}), including 2.922 square miles (7.569 km^{2}) of land and 0.011 square miles (0.029 km^{2}) of water (0.38%).

== Demographics ==
Historical population
Census	Pop.	Note	%±
2010	981		—
2020	881		−10.2%
U.S. Decennial Census

Vienna first appeared as a census designated place in the 2010 U.S. census formed from part of the deleted Great Meadows-Vienna CDP and additional area.

=== 2020 census ===
Vienna CDP, New Jersey – Racial and ethnic composition Note: the US Census treats Hispanic/Latino as an ethnic category. This table excludes Latinos from the racial categories and assigns them to a separate category. Hispanics/Latinos may be of any race.
Race / Ethnicity (NH = Non-Hispanic)	Pop 2010	Pop 2020	% 2010	% 2020
White alone (NH)	894	764	91.13%	86.72%
Black or African American alone (NH)	6	18	0.61%	2.04%
Native American or Alaska Native alone (NH)	0	0	0.00%	0.00%
Asian alone (NH)	6	14	0.61%	1.59%
Native Hawaiian or Pacific Islander alone (NH)	0	1	0.00%	0.11%
Other race alone (NH)	0	8	0.00%	0.91%
Mixed race or Multiracial (NH)	21	17	2.14%	1.93%
Hispanic or Latino (any race)	54	59	5.50%	6.70%
Total	981	881	100.00%	100.00%

=== 2010 census ===
The 2010 United States census counted 981 people, 331 households, and 270 families in the CDP. The population density was 335.7 per square mile (129.6/km^{2}). There were 337 housing units at an average density of 115.3 per square mile (44.5/km^{2}). The racial makeup was 92.56% (908) White, 0.71% (7) Black or African American, 0.10% (1) Native American, 0.61% (6) Asian, 0.00% (0) Pacific Islander, 3.77% (37) from other races, and 2.24% (22) from two or more races. Hispanic or Latino of any race were 5.50% (54) of the population.

Of the 331 households, 38.4% had children under the age of 18; 69.5% were married couples living together; 6.9% had a female householder with no husband present and 18.4% were non-families. Of all households, 15.1% were made up of individuals and 6.0% had someone living alone who was 65 years of age or older. The average household size was 2.96 and the average family size was 3.28.

26.0% of the population were under the age of 18, 8.4% from 18 to 24, 21.3% from 25 to 44, 35.0% from 45 to 64, and 9.4% who were 65 years of age or older. The median age was 41.6 years. For every 100 females, the population had 108.3 males. For every 100 females ages 18 and older there were 105.1 males.
