= Cole Kimball =

American baseball player (born 1985)

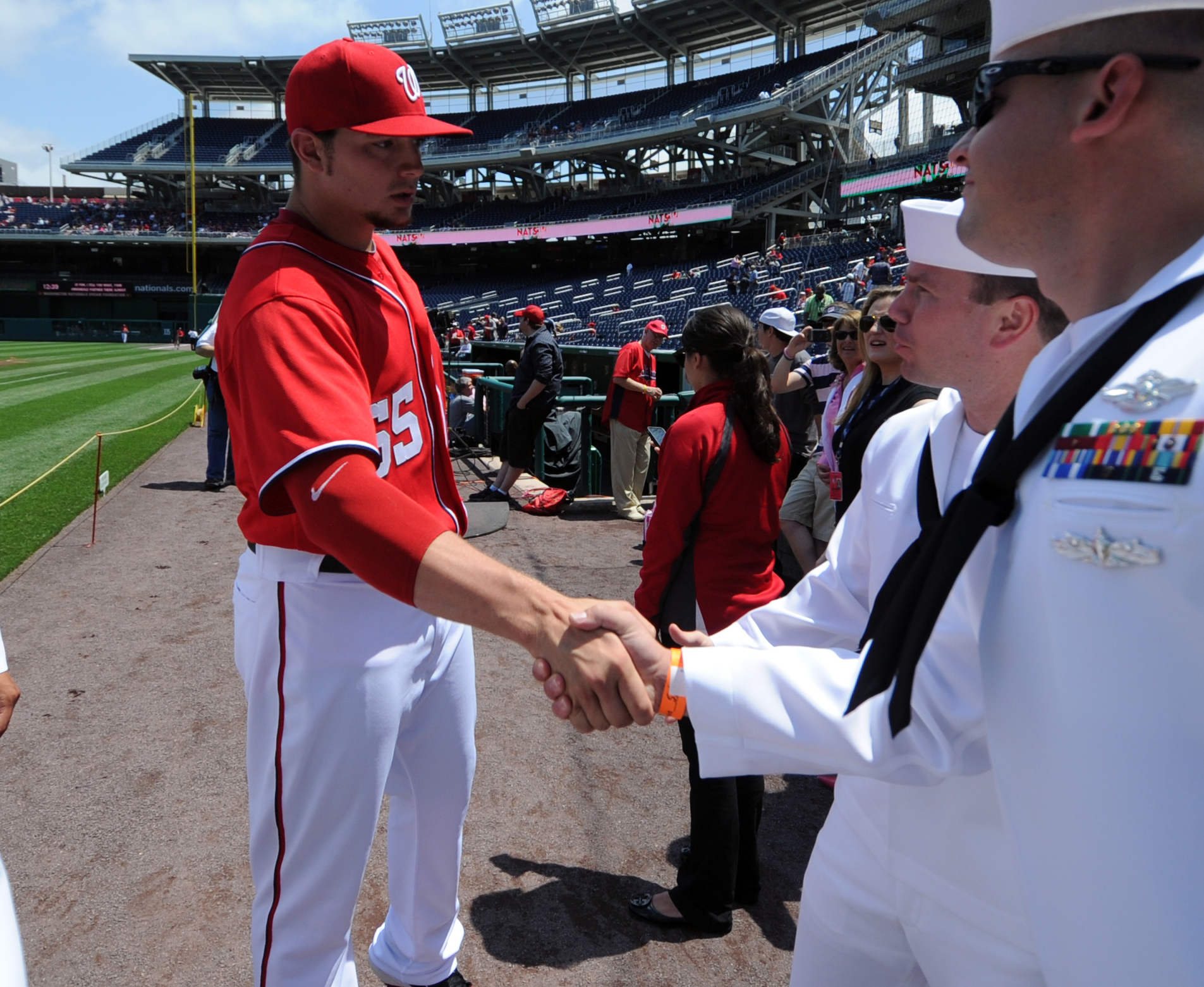
- Kimball (left) with the Washington Nationals
- Pitcher
- Born: August 1, 1985 (age 40); Brooklyn, New York, U.S.
- Batted: Right Threw: Right

MLB debut
- May 14, 2011, for the Washington Nationals

Last MLB appearance
- June 9, 2011, for the Washington Nationals

MLB statistics
- Won-Loss record: 1-0
- Earned run average: 1.93
- Strikeouts: 11
- Stats at Baseball Reference

Teams
- Washington Nationals (2011)

Cole A. Kimball (born August 1, 1985) is an American former professional baseball pitcher. He played in Major League Baseball (MLB) for the Washington Nationals.

== Career ==
Born in Brooklyn, Kimball moved to the Great Meadows section of Independence Township, New Jersey as a child. A graduate of Hackettstown High School, Kimball first attended St. John's University in New York, before transferring to Centenary College of New Jersey and was selected by the Nationals in the 12th round of the 2006 Major League Baseball draft.

=== Washington Nationals ===
After being drafted by Washington, Kimball began his minor league career pitching for the Vermont Lake Monsters in the rookie-level New York–Penn League. In five starts and eleven relief appearances, he pitched 34 innings, compiling a win–loss record of 1–4 and an ERA of 5.82.

Kimball remained with the Lake Monsters in 2007. He accrued a record of 3 wins and 6 losses and a 4.20 ERA over 61 innings, consisting of 13 starts and one appearance in relief. After an unimpressive 2008 season with the Low-A Hagerstown Suns, where he compiled a 6-8 record and a 5.05 ERA he was promoted to the Potomac Nationals (High-A) and converted to a reliever. His woes worsened, and although he saved 9 games, his ERA was 6.36.

In 2010, however, Kimball seemed to turn the corner. Starting the season at Potomac, he was 3-0 with six saves and an ERA of 1.82 before he was promoted. With the Double-A Harrisburg Senators, he continued to pitch well, earning 12 more saves to go with a 5-1 record and ERA of 2.33.

Kimball started the 2011 season with the Triple-A Syracuse Nationals. After 12 appearances, in which he threw 13 2/3 innings, without allowing a run, he was called up to the majors. He made his debut on May 14, pitching one scoreless inning. He made 12 appearances for the Nationals before suffering a torn rotator cuff in July 2011. He had surgery, and missed the remainder of the 2011 season.

Kimball was claimed off waivers by the Toronto Blue Jays on November 16, 2011. However, the Nationals claimed him back on November 18. He missed the 2012 season as he recovered from his injury. On July 3, 2013, Kimball was removed from the 40-man roster and sent outright to the Triple-A Syracuse Chiefs. He elected free agency following the season on November 4.

=== New York Yankees ===
On February 7, 2014, Kimball signed a minor league contract with the New York Yankees. In 18 appearances for the Double-A Trenton Thunder, he posted an 0-2 record and 4.73 ERA with 28 strikeouts across 26 2/3 innings pitched. Kimball was released by the Yankees organization on June 6.

=== Camden Riversharks ===
Kimball spent the remainder of 2014 with the Camden Riversharks of the Atlantic League of Professional Baseball. In 29 appearances out of the bullpen, he logged a 2-2 record and 1.91 ERA with 34 strikeouts and 2 saves over 33 innings of work. Kimball became a free agent following the season.

=== Saraperos de Saltillo ===
On April 28, 2015, Kimball signed with the Saraperos de Saltillo of the Mexican League. In 5 games for Saltillo, he struggled to a 14.73 ERA with 4 strikeouts across 3 2/3 innings pitched. Kimball was released by the Saraperos on May 7.
