= The Wonder City of Oz =

1940 book by John R. Neill

- Cover of The Wonder City of Oz
- Author: John R. Neill
- Illustrator: John R. Neill
- Language: English
- Series: The Oz Books
- Genre: Children's novel Fantasy
- Publisher: Reilly & Lee
- Publication date: 1940
- Publication place: United States
- Media type: Print (Hardcover)
- Pages: 318 pp.
- Preceded by: Ozoplaning with the Wizard of Oz
- Followed by: The Scalawagons of Oz

The Wonder City of Oz (1940) is the thirty-fourth book in the Oz series created by L. Frank Baum and his successors, and the first written and illustrated solely by John R. Neill Neill introduced a modern-day reimagining change in tone that continued through his subsequent books, according to David L. Greene and Dick Martin of The Oz Scrapbook; "(His Oz entries) ...are highly imaginative, but the imagination is undisciplined; each book, in fact, has enough ideas to fill several." In Neill's interpretation; Emerald City has skyscrapers and gas stations. Normally inanimate objects act alive: houses talk and fight, shoes sing (they have tongues), and clocks run. The book was followed by Neill's The Scalawagons of Oz (1941).

== The plot ==
Jenny Jump captures a leprechaun named Siko Pompus (apparently a pun on "psychopomp") and forces him to make her into a fairy; but he only does half the job before escaping. Jenny then jumps to Oz using her half-fairy gifts. She lands in the carriage of Princess Ozma during a parade — and quickly expresses her desire to be a queen herself.

Jenny displays a bold and tempestuous nature; when she loses her temper she spits flames from her mouth. Yet she is also enterprising and resourceful; she soon sets up a Style Shop with a magic turnstile which gives fashion makeovers (the turnstile turns styles). Jenny half-adopts a Munchkin boy called Number Nine (he's the ninth of fourteen children) who is overwhelmed by the force of her personality, and she treats him like a slave.

Jenny's disruptive nature quickly becomes apparent. In response, the Wizard removes her fairy abilities and starts making her younger. Jenny has her good points too: she saves the Emerald City from conquest by an army of chocolate soldiers. Yet her ambition lures her into running against Ozma in an Ozlection to become ruler of the Land of Oz. It is clear that Ozma will win any fair election by a landslide — but a landslide is a terribly dangerous thing to have in the Emerald City. So Prof. Wogglebug cooks up a more random choice, in which citizens are weighed on scales to determine their votes. In the end, the Ozlection is exactly a tie, with a precisely equal number of votes cast for Ozma and for Jenny Jump. Only one person has yet to vote: the leprechaun Siko Pompus. He assures Jenny that he is her friend, and then he steps forward to cast the deciding vote...for Ozma. He claims it's for Jenny's own good, to save her "a heap of responsibility."

Jenny is so irate at this outcome that she causes chaos in the city: she releases the tigers from tiger-lilies, the bulls from bullrushes, the lions from dandy-lions, etc., to rampage through the streets. The Wizard resolves matters with his magic: he extracts Jenny's bad temper, envy, and ambition, so that these faults no longer plague her. He makes these faults visible for Number Nine, Dorothy, and other assembled friends: bad temper is a black wasp, envy is a green snake, and ambition is a fat red toad. Jenny is delighted with the change in her by quoting "How grand I feel!" Ozma and Glinda make Jenny a Duchess of Oz and she is now young and carefree enough to be a fitting companion for Number Nine.

Finally, Jenny's leprechaun godfather gives her back her fairy gifts, in externalized and material forms: "an ivory-handled eyeglass for one eye" that provides fairy sight, and a pair of rose-colored gloves, "a golden slipper for her left foot, and a pair of thistle-down earmuffs" that enable her other fairy powers, whenever she needs them.

== Editorial interference ==
The Ozlection storyline, with its shoes-as-votes scenario, was not written by Neill but by an anonymous editor who found portions of Neill's version of the book inadequate. None of the incidents in this plot thread are illustrated by Neill. Baum biographer Katharine M. Rogers points out this storyline as a particular example of the unbelievable situations in Neill's books.

== Geography ==
In a prefatory note addressed to the book's child readers, Neill states that he and his family live in Flanders, New Jersey, which he describes as "on top of the Schooley Mountains and the Jenny Jump Mountains are really truly mountains right next to us." He characterizes them as "wonderful mountains for fairies to hide in." As Neill indicates, Jenny Jump Mountain is a real place, located in northwestern New Jersey in the Jenny Jump State Forest.

The Oz books
Previous book: Ozoplaning with the Wizard of Oz	The Wonder City of Oz; 1940	Next book: The Scalawagons of Oz
