= Danville Mountain =

Mountain in New Jersey, United States

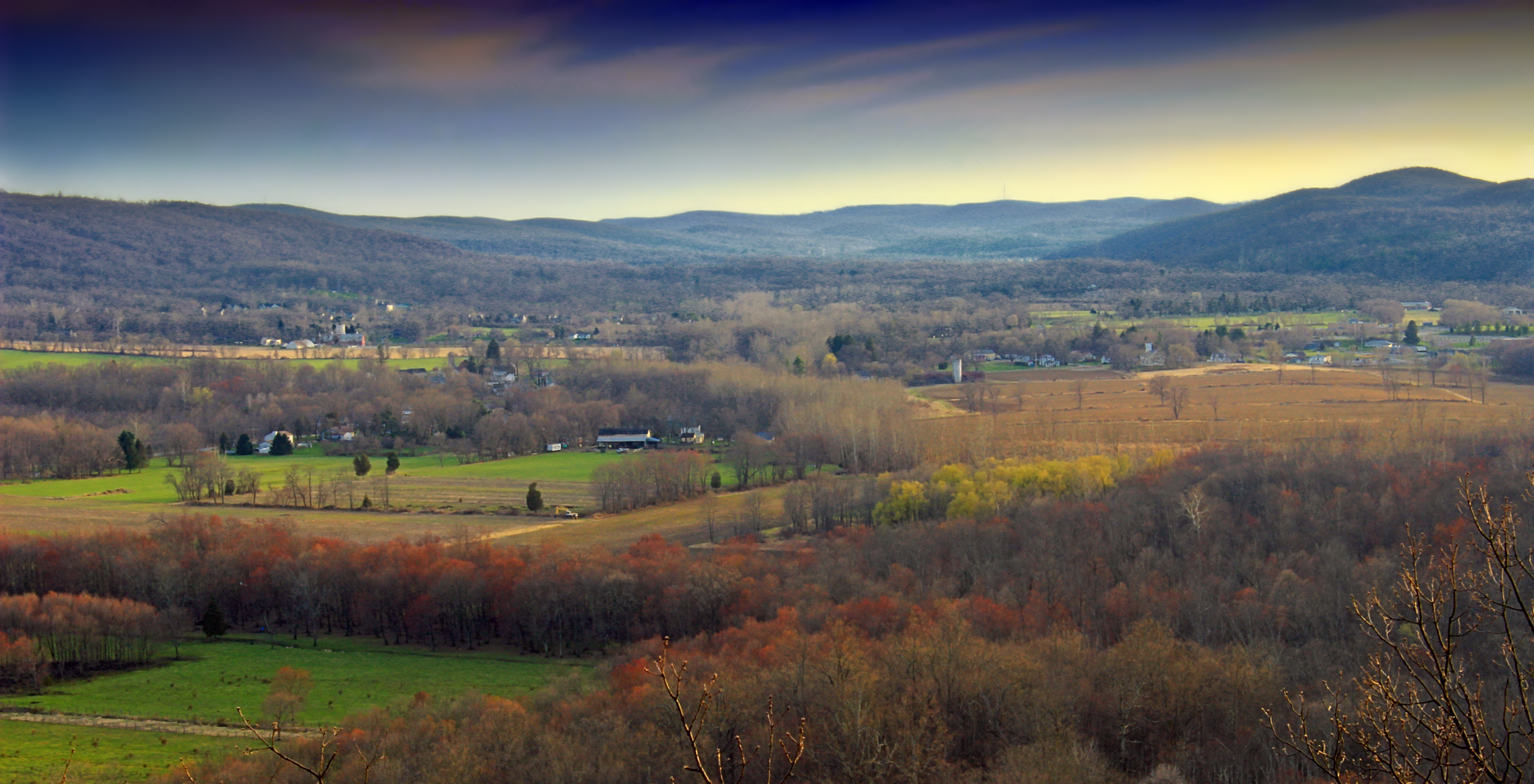
- Danville Mountain is visible on the right side

Highest point
- Elevation: 1,122 ft (342 m) NGVD 29
- Coordinates: 40°52′10″N 74°56′14″W

Geography
- Location: Warren County, New Jersey, U.S.
- Topo map: USGS Washington

Climbing
- Easiest route: Hiking

Danville Mountain is a mountain in Warren County, New Jersey. The summit rises to 1,122 feet (342 m), and is located in Liberty Township. It is part of the New York–New Jersey Highlands of the Appalachian Mountains, although somewhat isolated to the west of the main body of the Highlands.
