= Great Meadows-Vienna, New Jersey =

Populated place in Warren County, New Jersey, US

- Former census-designated place
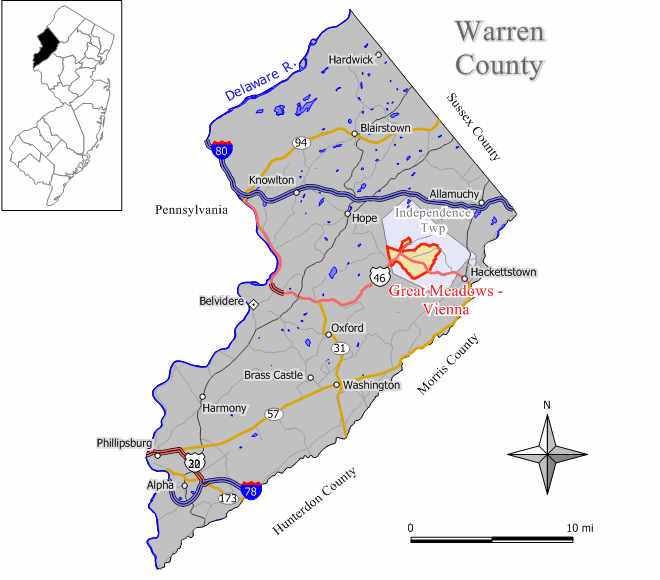
- Map of Great Meadows-Vienna CDP in Warren County
- Coordinates: 40°51′53″N 74°53′49″W
- Country: United States
- State: New Jersey
- County: Warren
- Township: Independence

Area
  - Total: 4.2 sq mi (10.9 km^{2})
  - Land: 4.2 sq mi (10.9 km^{2})
  - Water: 0 sq mi (0.0 km^{2})

Population (2000 census)
  - Total: 1,264
  - Density: 300/sq mi (115.7/km^{2})
- Time zone: UTC−05:00 (Eastern (EST))
  - Summer (DST): UTC−04:00 (Eastern (EDT))
- FIPS code: 34-27366

Great Meadows-Vienna was an unincorporated community and census-designated place (CDP) located within Independence Township, in Warren County, in the U.S. state of New Jersey. As of the 2000 United States census, the CDP's population was 1,264.

The combined CDP existed through the 2000 Census. Effective with the 2010 United States census, the CDP was split into its components, Great Meadows (with a 2010 Census population of 303) and Vienna (981 as of 2010).

== Geography ==
According to the United States Census Bureau, the CDP had a total area of 10.9 km^{2} (4.2 sq mi), all land.

== Demographics ==
Historical population
| Census | Pop. | Note | %± |
|---|---|---|---|
| 1990 | 1,108 | | — |
| 2000 | 1,264 | | 14.1% |
source: 2000

=== 2000 census ===
As of the 2000 United States census there were 1,264 people, 403 households, and 334 families residing in the CDP. The population density was 115.6 people/km^{2} (299 people/mi^{2}). There were 413 housing units at an average density of 37.8 units/km^{2} (98 units/mi^{2}). The racial makeup of the CDP was 96.60% White, 0.79% African American, 0.08% Native American, 0.95% Asian, and 1.58% from two or more races. Hispanic or Latino of any race were 1.19% of the population.

There were 403 households, out of which 48.9% had children under the age of 18 living with them, 71.5% were married couples living together, 8.9% had a female householder with no husband present, and 17.1% were non-families. 12.4% of all households were made up of individuals, and 5.2% had someone living alone who was 65 years of age or older. The average household size was 3.14 and the average family size was 3.44.

In the CDP the population was spread out, with 33.1% under the age of 18, 5.6% from 18 to 24, 30.1% from 25 to 44, 24.8% from 45 to 64, and 6.3% who were 65 years of age or older. The median age was 35 years. For every 100 females, there were 98.4 males. For every 100 females age 18 and over, there were 95.2 males.

The median income for a household in the CDP was $70,000, and the median income for a family was $71,600. Males had a median income of $50,729 versus $33,229 for females. The per capita income for the CDP was $27,688. None of the families and 1.4% of the population were living below the poverty line, including no under eighteens and 10.6% of those over 64.
