= Beaver Brook (New Jersey) =

River in New Jersey, United States

Coordinates: 40°56′09″N 74°28′12″W

Beaver Brook is a 14.2-mile-long (22.9 km) tributary of the Pequest River in western New Jersey in the United States.

Beaver Brook originates near Blairstown and terminates at its confluence with the Pequest River near Belvidere.

== See also ==
- List of rivers of New Jersey
