= Independence Township, New Jersey =

Township in Warren County, New Jersey, US

- Township
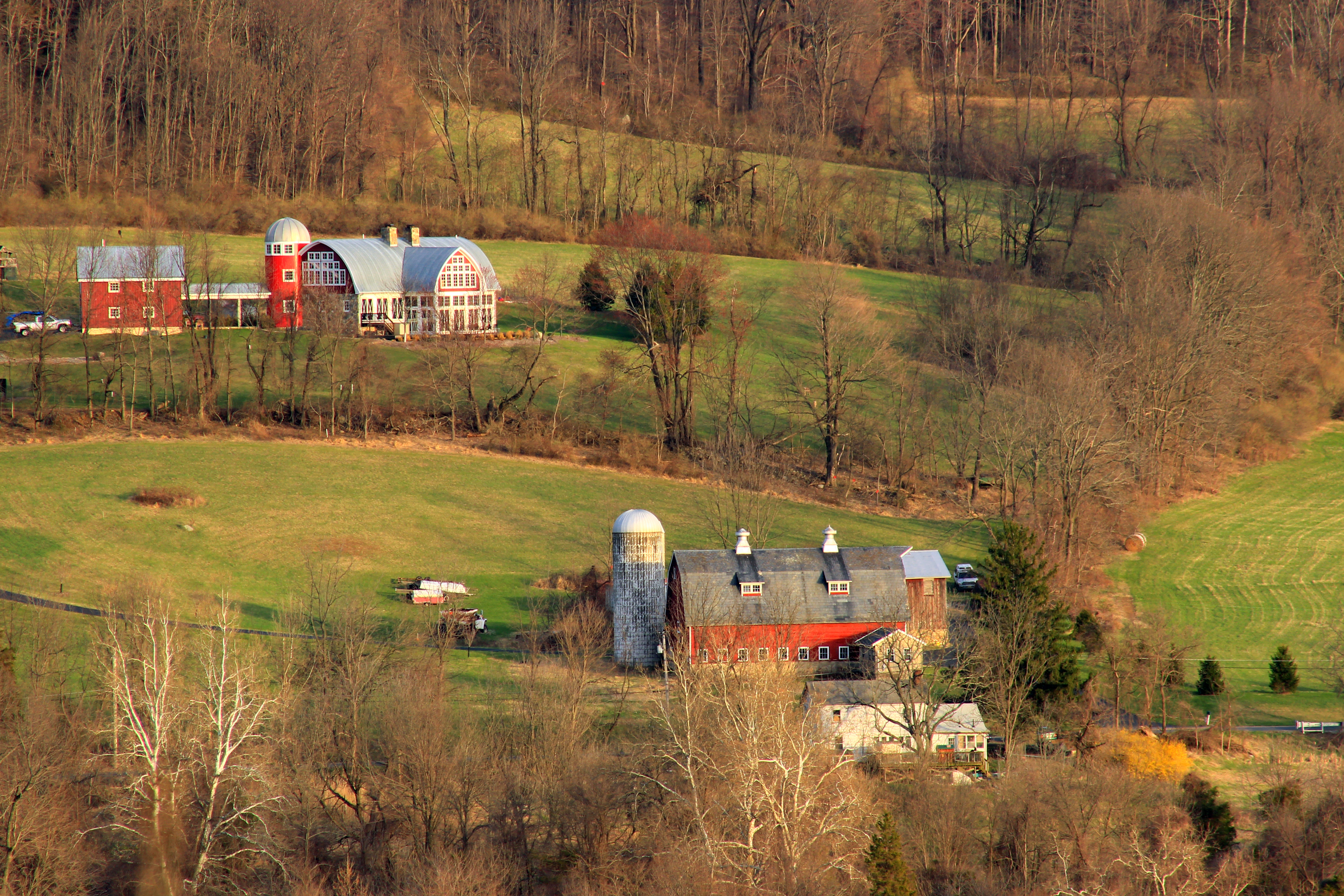
- Pequest River Valley farms in Independence Township, April 2013

- Seal

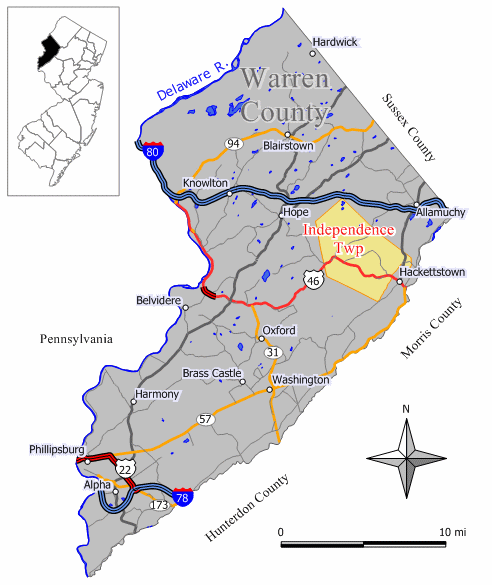
- Location of Independence Township in Warren County highlighted in yellow (right). Inset map: Location of Warren County in New Jersey highlighted in black (left).

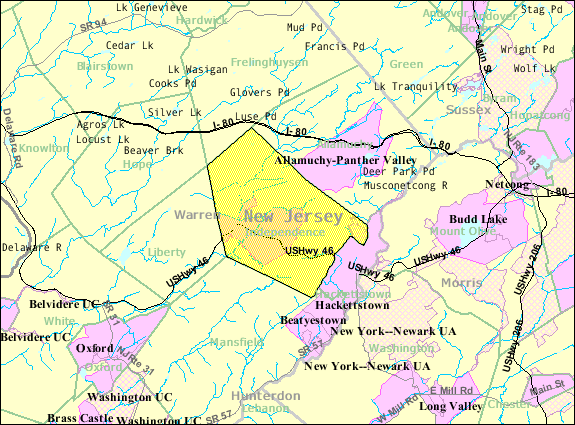
- Census Bureau map of Independence Township, New Jersey

- Location in Warren County Location in New Jersey Location in the United States
- Coordinates: 40.880001°N 74.876253°W
- Country: United States
- State: New Jersey
- County: Warren
- Formed: November 11, 1782
- Incorporated: February 21, 1798
- Named for: American independence

Government
  - Type: Township
  - Body: Township Committee
  - Mayor: Robert E. Giordano (R, term ends December 31, 2023)
  - Municipal clerk: Dena Hrebenak

Area
  - Total: 19.98 sq mi (51.75 km^{2})
  - Land: 19.83 sq mi (51.36 km^{2})
  - Water: 0.15 sq mi (0.39 km^{2}) 0.76%
  - Rank: 143rd of 565 in state 10th of 22 in county
- Elevation: 518 ft (158 m)

Population (2020)
  - Total: 5,469
  - Estimate (2023): 5,519
  - Rank: 365th of 565 in state 9th of 22 in county
  - Density: 275.8/sq mi (106.5/km^{2})
  - Rank: 482nd of 565 in state 10th of 22 in county
- Time zone: UTC−05:00 (Eastern (EST))
  - Summer (DST): UTC−04:00 (Eastern (EDT))
- ZIP Code: 07838 – Great Meadows
- Area code: 908 exchange: 637
- FIPS code: 3404133930
- GNIS feature ID: 0882244
- Website: www.independencenj.com

Independence Township is a township in Warren County, in the U.S. state of New Jersey. As of the 2020 United States census, the township's population was 5,469, a decrease of 193 (−3.4%) from the 2010 census count of 5,662, which in turn reflected an increase of 59 (+1.1%) from the 5,603 counted in the 2000 census.

== History ==
Independence Township was originally created on November 11, 1782, from Hardwick Township, while the area was still part of Sussex County, and was incorporated as one of the state's initial group of 104 townships by an act of the New Jersey Legislature on February 21, 1798. Most of Independence Township became part of the newly created Warren County on November 20, 1824, with the remainder becoming part of Green Township in Sussex County. Portions of the township were taken to form Hackettstown (March 9, 1853) and Allamuchy Township (April 4, 1873). The township was named for American independence.

Through the Township the major brooks and the Great Meadows drain into the Pequest River which winds slowly from northeast to southwest to flow on through the county and eventually into the Delaware River at Belvidere. Part of the eastern land drains under the Morris Canal bed and south into the Musconetcong River just below the boundary with Mansfield Township. The hillsides are steep, layered with rock and limestone while the valleys still hold soil deposited here from the receding glaciers. Mastodon bones and a few relics of the early Indian dwellers still occasionally can be found as well as coveys of game birds, some white tail deer and small game.

This area was initially settled and cleared as farmland for growing hay and grain or as pastureland. Timber was cut for lumber, grain was milled into flour, and some iron ore was mined from the Jenny Jump Mountain area during the late eighteenth and early nineteenth century. The mining of iron ore which attracted the early settlers, the later iron foundries, and many of the early industries have disappeared as has the Morris Canal and the railroads as the major means of shipping freight. After many attempts the Great Meadow was drained with the water channeled to permit successful development of commercial vegetable production. Shipping over the years has been by wagon, small trucks, rail freight, and then by large trailer trucks.

== Geography ==
According to the United States Census Bureau, the township had a total area of 19.98 square miles (51.75 km^{2}), including 19.83 square miles (51.36 km^{2}) of land and 0.15 square miles (0.39 km^{2}) of water (0.76%).

Great Meadows (2020 Census population of 305) and Vienna (881) are unincorporated communities and census-designated places (CDPs) located within the township. Through the 2000 United States census, the areas were grouped together as Great Meadows-Vienna, which had a population of 1,264 as of that year.

Other unincorporated communities, localities and place names located partially or completely within the township include Petersburgh.

The township borders the Warren County municipalities of Allamuchy Township, Frelinghuysen Township, Hackettstown, Liberty Township and Mansfield Township.

== Demographics ==
Historical population
Census	Pop.	Note	%±
1810	1,224		—
1820	1,850		51.1%
1830	2,126		14.9%
1840	2,140		0.7%
1850	2,621		22.5%
1860	1,871	*	−28.6%
1870	1,766		−5.6%
1880	1,018	*	−42.4%
1890	904		−11.2%
1900	805		−11.0%
1910	867		7.7%
1920	933		7.6%
1930	964		3.3%
1940	1,046		8.5%
1950	1,169		11.8%
1960	1,509		29.1%
1970	2,057		36.3%
1980	2,829		37.5%
1990	3,940		39.3%
2000	5,603		42.2%
2010	5,662		1.1%
2020	5,469		−3.4%
2023 (est.)	5,519		0.9%
Population sources: 1810–1920 1840 1850–1870; 1850 1870 1880–1890; 1890–1910 1910–1930; 1940–2000 2000; 2010 2020 * = Lost territory in previous decade

The Township's economic data (as is all of Warren County) is calculated by the US Census Bureau as part of the Allentown-Bethlehem-Easton, PA-NJ Metropolitan Statistical Area.

=== 2010 census ===
The 2010 United States census counted 5,662 people, 2,234 households, and 1,506 families in the township. The population density was 286.8 per square mile (110.7/km^{2}). There were 2,325 housing units at an average density of 117.8 per square mile (45.5/km^{2}). The racial makeup was 93.43% (5,290) White, 1.22% (69) Black or African American, 0.09% (5) Native American, 2.23% (126) Asian, 0.07% (4) Pacific Islander, 1.61% (91) from other races, and 1.36% (77) from two or more races. Hispanic or Latino of any race were 5.42% (307) of the population.

Of the 2,234 households, 30.7% had children under the age of 18; 55.8% were married couples living together; 8.2% had a female householder with no husband present and 32.6% were non-families. Of all households, 26.9% were made up of individuals and 8.0% had someone living alone who was 65 years of age or older. The average household size was 2.53 and the average family size was 3.13.

23.4% of the population were under the age of 18, 7.1% from 18 to 24, 25.6% from 25 to 44, 33.0% from 45 to 64, and 10.9% who were 65 years of age or older. The median age was 41.0 years. For every 100 females, the population had 94.0 males. For every 100 females ages 18 and older there were 90.3 males.

The Census Bureau's 2006–2010 American Community Survey showed that (in 2010 inflation-adjusted dollars) median household income was $89,844 (with a margin of error of +/− $7,094) and the median family income was $104,808 (+/− $8,796). Males had a median income of $72,719 (+/− $6,017) versus $58,413 (+/− $7,006) for females. The per capita income for the borough was $36,372 (+/− $2,731). About 1.6% of families and 1.8% of the population were below the poverty line, including 2.2% of those under age 18 and 7.7% of those age 65 or over.

=== 2000 census ===
As of the 2000 United States census there were 5,603 people, 2,146 households, and 1,489 families residing in the township. The population density was 282.4 inhabitants per square mile (109.0/km^{2}). There were 2,210 housing units at an average density of 111.4 per square mile (43.0/km^{2}). The racial makeup of the township was 94.98% White, 1.16% African American, 0.05% Native American, 1.73% Asian, 0.79% from other races, and 1.29% from two or more races. Hispanic or Latino of any race were 3.77% of the population.

There were 2,146 households, out of which 36.5% had children under the age of 18 living with them, 60.0% were married couples living together, 6.8% had a female householder with no husband present, and 30.6% were non-families. 24.5% of all households were made up of individuals, and 7.0% had someone living alone who was 65 years of age or older. The average household size was 2.61 and the average family size was 3.18.

In the township the population was spread out, with 26.8% under the age of 18, 5.2% from 18 to 24, 34.9% from 25 to 44, 25.1% from 45 to 64, and 8.0% who were 65 years of age or older. The median age was 37 years. For every 100 females, there were 93.7 males. For every 100 females age 18 and over, there were 90.4 males.

The median income for a household in the township was $67,247, and the median income for a family was $79,819. Males had a median income of $59,688 versus $37,643 for females. The per capita income for the township was $30,555. About 1.2% of families and 2.8% of the population were below the poverty line, including 2.0% of those under age 18 and 6.3% of those age 65 or over.

== Government ==
=== Local government ===
Independence Township is governed under the Township form of New Jersey municipal government, one of 141 municipalities (of the 564) statewide that use this form, the second-most commonly used form of government in the state. The Township Committee is comprised of five members, who are elected directly by the voters at-large in partisan elections to serve three-year terms of office on a staggered basis, with either one or two seats coming up for election each year as part of the November general election in a three-year cycle. At an annual reorganization meeting, the Township Committee selects one of its members to serve as Mayor.

As of 2022, members of the Independence Township Committee are Mayor Robert M. Giordano (R, term on committee ends December 31, 2024; term as mayor ends 2022), Glenn Cougle (R, 2024), Kathleen Gesumaria (R, 2023), Bonnie Kelsey (R, 2023) and Michael S. Pennington (R, 2022).

=== Federal, state, and county representation ===
Independence Township is located in the 7th Congressional District and is part of New Jersey's 24th state legislative district.

For the 119th United States Congress, New Jersey's 7th congressional district is represented by Thomas Kean Jr. (R, Westfield). New Jersey is represented in the United States Senate by Democrats Cory Booker (Newark, term ends 2027) and Andy Kim (Moorestown, term ends 2031).

For the 2026–2027 session, the 24th legislative district of the New Jersey Legislature is represented in the State Senate by Parker Space (R, Wantage Township) and in the General Assembly by Dawn Fantasia (R, Franklin) and Mike Inganamort (R, Chester Township).

Warren County is governed by a three-member Board of County Commissioners, who are chosen at-large on a staggered basis in partisan elections with one seat coming up for election each year as part of the November general election. At an annual reorganization meeting held in the beginning of January, the board selects one of its members to serve as Commissioner Director and other as Deputy Director. As of 2025, Warren County's Commissioners are:

Deputy Director Jason J. Sarnoski (R, Lopatcong Township; 2025), Lori Ciesla (R, Lopatcong Township; 2026), and Director James R. Kern III (R, Pohatcong Township; 2027).

Constitutional officers of Warren County are: Clerk Holly Mackey (R, Alpha; 2027), Sheriff James McDonald Sr. (R, Phillipsburg; 2025) and Surrogate Michael J. Doherty (R, Washington; 2025).

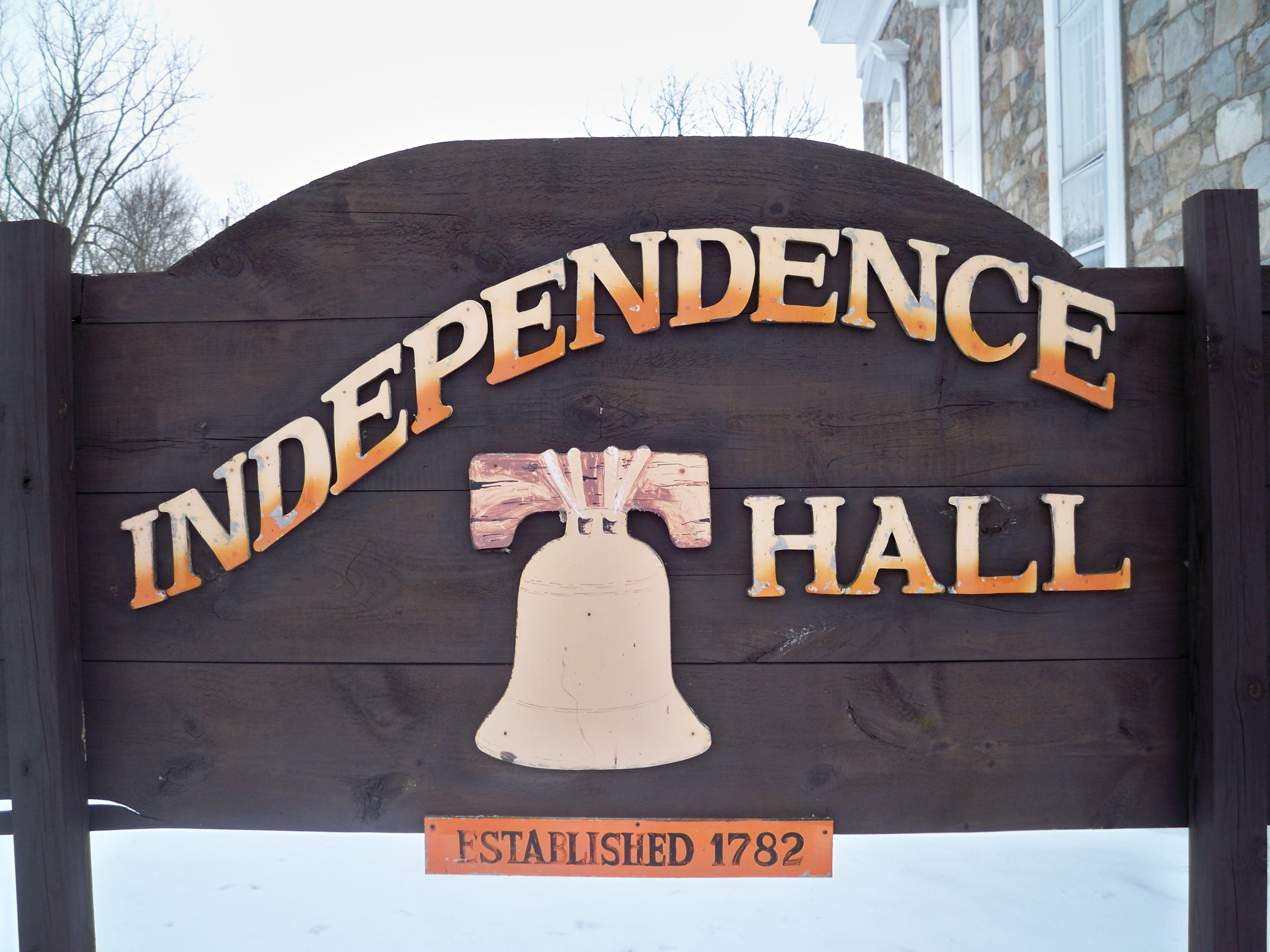
Independence Hall, home of the Independence Township Senior Center

=== Politics ===
As of March 2011, there were a total of 3,789 registered voters in Independence Township, of which 691 (18.2% vs. 21.5% countywide) were registered as Democrats, 1,384 (36.5% vs. 35.3%) were registered as Republicans and 1,709 (45.1% vs. 43.1%) were registered as Unaffiliated. There were 5 voters registered as Libertarians or Greens. Among the township's 2010 Census population, 66.9% (vs. 62.3% in Warren County) were registered to vote, including 87.3% of those ages 18 and over (vs. 81.5% countywide).

Gubernatorial election results for Independence Township
Year	Republican		Democratic		Third party(ies)	
Year	No.	%	No.	%	No.	%
2025	1,426	55.99%	1,097	43.07%	24	0.94%
2021	1,331	63.11%	757	35.89%	21	1.00%
2017	921	60.59%	563	37.04%	36	2.37%
2013	1,037	72.52%	376	26.29%	17	1.19%
2009	1,176	64.72%	435	23.94%	206	11.34%
2005	1,006	61.98%	533	32.84%	84	5.18%

In the 2012 presidential election, Republican Mitt Romney received 1,500 votes (58.8% vs. 56.0% countywide), ahead of Democrat Barack Obama with 964 votes (37.8% vs. 40.8%) and other candidates with 51 votes (2.0% vs. 1.7%), among the 2,550 ballots cast by the township's 3,836 registered voters, for a turnout of 66.5% (vs. 66.7% in Warren County). In the 2008 presidential election, Republican John McCain received 1,559 votes (55.7% vs. 55.2% countywide), ahead of Democrat Barack Obama with 1,159 votes (41.4% vs. 41.4%) and other candidates with 49 votes (1.8% vs. 1.6%), among the 2,797 ballots cast by the township's 3,784 registered voters, for a turnout of 73.9% (vs. 73.4% in Warren County). In the 2004 presidential election, Republican George W. Bush received 1,763 votes (64.4% vs. 61.0% countywide), ahead of Democrat John Kerry with 927 votes (33.9% vs. 37.2%) and other candidates with 35 votes (1.3% vs. 1.3%), among the 2,736 ballots cast by the township's 3,518 registered voters, for a turnout of 77.8% (vs. 76.3% in the whole county).

United States presidential election results for Independence Township
Year	Republican		Democratic		Third party(ies)	
Year	No.	%	No.	%	No.	%
2024	1,962	58.94%	1,299	39.02%	68	2.04%
2020	1,837	54.45%	1,468	43.51%	69	2.05%
2016	1,682	61.01%	969	35.15%	106	3.84%
2012	1,500	59.64%	964	38.33%	51	2.03%
2008	1,559	56.34%	1,159	41.89%	49	1.77%
2004	1,763	64.70%	927	34.02%	35	1.28%

In the 2013 gubernatorial election, Republican Chris Christie received 72.5% of the vote (1,037 cast), ahead of Democrat Barbara Buono with 26.3% (376 votes), and other candidates with 1.2% (17 votes), among the 1,450 ballots cast by the township's 3,879 registered voters (20 ballots were spoiled), for a turnout of 37.4%. In the 2009 gubernatorial election, Republican Chris Christie received 1,176 votes (63.8% vs. 61.3% countywide), ahead of Democrat Jon Corzine with 435 votes (23.6% vs. 25.7%), Independent Chris Daggett with 182 votes (9.9% vs. 9.8%) and other candidates with 24 votes (1.3% vs. 1.5%), among the 1,842 ballots cast by the township's 3,733 registered voters, yielding a 49.3% turnout (vs. 49.6% in the county).

United States Senate election results for Independence Township1
Year	Republican		Democratic		Third party(ies)	
Year	No.	%	No.	%	No.	%
2024	1,867	57.95%	1,263	39.20%	92	2.86%
2018	1,339	59.01%	852	37.55%	78	3.44%
2012	1,414	59.21%	924	38.69%	50	2.09%
2006	1,039	63.35%	546	33.29%	55	3.35%

United States Senate election results for Independence Township2
Year	Republican		Democratic		Third party(ies)	
Year	No.	%	No.	%	No.	%
2020	1,814	54.64%	1,423	42.86%	83	2.50%
2014	774	60.61%	463	36.26%	40	3.13%
2013	642	65.71%	330	33.78%	5	0.51%
2008	1,555	59.33%	1,003	38.27%	63	2.40%

== Education ==
Public school students in pre-kindergarten through eighth grade attend the Great Meadows Regional School District, together with students from Liberty Township. The New Jersey Superior Court, Appellate Division blocked a 2007 effort by Liberty Township to leave the Great Meadows district based on Liberty's greater share of district costs, with the court citing the inability of the two communities to provide an efficient education separately. As of the 2021–22 school year, the district, comprised of two schools, had an enrollment of 643 students and 59.2 classroom teachers (on an FTE basis), for a student–teacher ratio of 10.9:1. Schools in the district (with 2021–22 school year enrollment from the National Center for Education Statistics) are Central Elementary School with 302 students in grades PreK-3 and Great Meadows Middle School with 337 students in grades 4–8.

Students attending public school for ninth through twelfth grades attend Hackettstown High School which serves students from Hackettstown, along with students from the townships of Allamuchy and Liberty, as part of a sending/receiving relationship with the Hackettstown School District. As of the 2021–22 school year, the high school had an enrollment of 869 students and 67.0 classroom teachers (on an FTE basis), for a student–teacher ratio of 13.0:1.

Students from the township and from all of Warren County are eligible to attend Ridge and Valley Charter School in Frelinghuysen Township (for grades K–8) or Warren County Technical School in Washington borough (for 9–12), with special education services provided by local districts supplemented throughout the county by the Warren County Special Services School District in Oxford Township (for Pre-K–12).

== Transportation ==
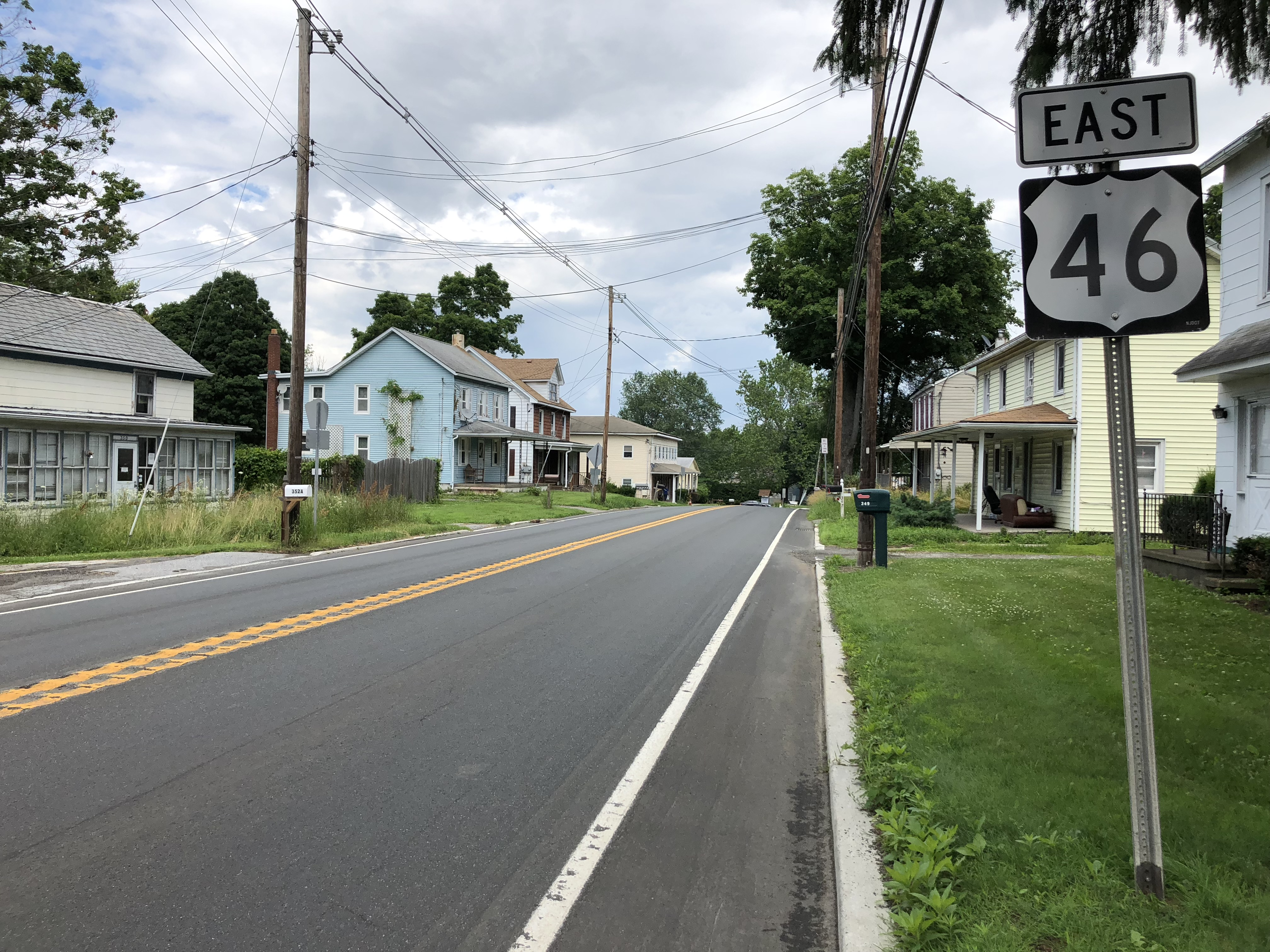
View east along U.S. Route 46 in Independence Township

As of May 2010, the township had a total of 46.85 miles (75.40 km) of roadways, of which 32.70 miles (52.63 km) were maintained by the municipality, 9.26 miles (14.90 km) by Warren County and 4.89 miles (7.87 km) by the New Jersey Department of Transportation.

CR 517 passes through in the eastern part of the township while U.S. Route 46 traverses 4.89 miles (7.87 km) across the southern part of the municipality.

Interstate 80 misses the township by less than 100 feet, but is accessible in both neighboring Allamuchy Township (exit 19) and Hope Township (exit 12).

The Great Meadows Railroad Station, along the abandoned Lehigh and Hudson Railway, is the only nineteenth-century station to remain preserved with all its structures. It was placed on the New Jersey and National Register of Historic Places in 1989.

== Notable people ==
People who were born in, residents of, or otherwise closely associated with Independence Township include:

- Bobby Caldwell (1951–2023), singer, songwriter, and musician, best known for his signature song "What You Won't Do for Love"
- Christina Desiderio (born 2000), artistic gymnast
- Chuck Haytaian (born 1938), former speaker of the New Jersey General Assembly
- Edwin Kaprat (1964–1995), serial killer, rapist, and arsonist who committed six murders in Tampa and Hernando County, Florida from 1991 to 1993, most being elderly women.
- Cole Kimball (born 1985), former professional baseball pitcher who played for the Washington Nationals
