= Jenny Jump State Forest =

Protected area in New Jersey, United States

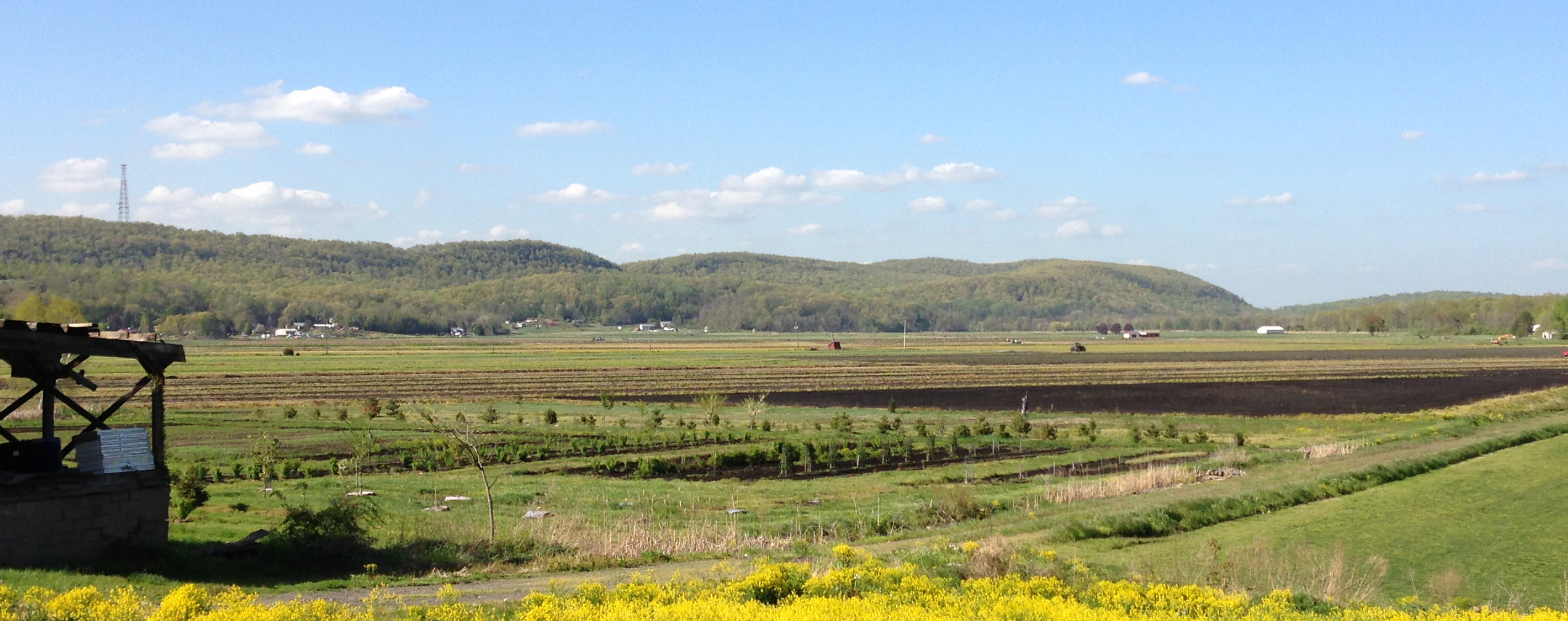
- View of Jenny Jump Mountain and Jenny Jump State Forest from Hope Road near Great Meadows

- Location within New Jersey Location within the United States
- Location: Warren County, New Jersey
- Coordinates: 40°55′19″N 74°55′32″W
- Area: 4,466 acres (18.07 km^{2})
- Opened: 1931
- Administrator: New Jersey Division of Parks and Forestry
- Website: Official website

Jenny Jump State Forest is a state park in the U.S. state of New Jersey operated by the New Jersey Department of Environmental Protection's Division of Parks and Forestry. It is located in northern Warren County in the northwestern section of New Jersey, on the 1,112-foot (339 m) high, 6-mile (10 km) long Jenny Jump Mountain ridge.

The park has extensive hiking trails on the mountainside, featuring large glacial boulders and outcroppings from the Wisconsin glaciation approximately 21,000 years ago.

It is said that the park was named after a girl named Jenny, who jumped to her death on Jenny Jump Mountain, while being chased by a Native American.

== Environment ==
The park's forests are part of the Northeastern coastal forests ecoregion.

== Facilities ==
The park grounds include the Greenwood Observatory, built by the United Astronomy Clubs of New Jersey (UACNJ) in 1995. The observatory is open for public stargazing on Saturday nights April through October. There are several other observatories located at Jenny Jump, including the Brady which houses a 178MM Refractor and a solar observatory. The area is used by many amateur astro photographers as Jenny Jump has some of the darkest skies in New Jersey.

The park has camping facilities April to October, and shelters available all year long.

== See also ==
- List of New Jersey state parks
- Jenny Jump, the heroine of some "Wizard of Oz" spin-off books.
- Shades of Death Road
