= Liberty Township, New Jersey =

Township in Warren County, New Jersey, US

- Township
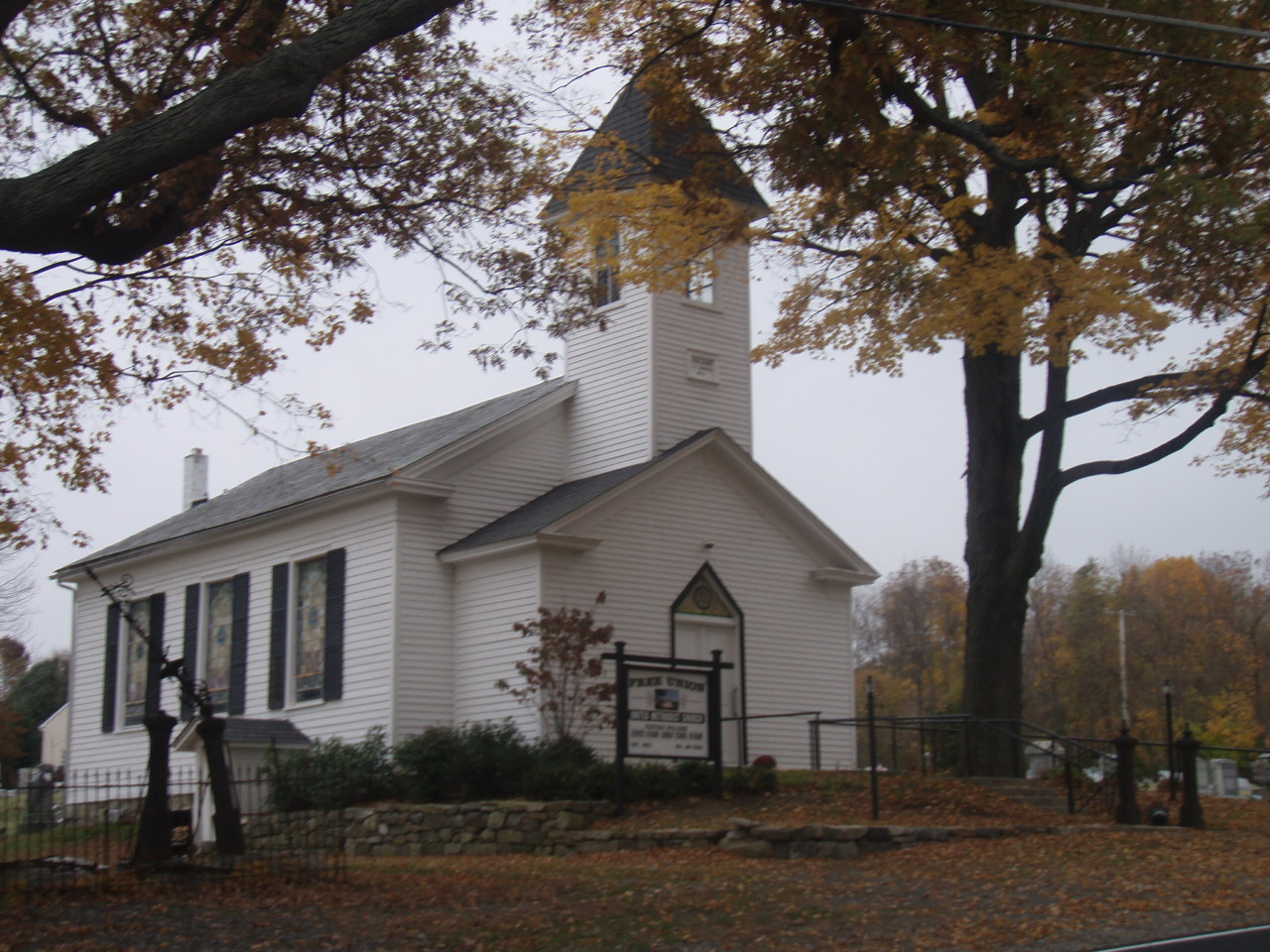
- Free Union Church

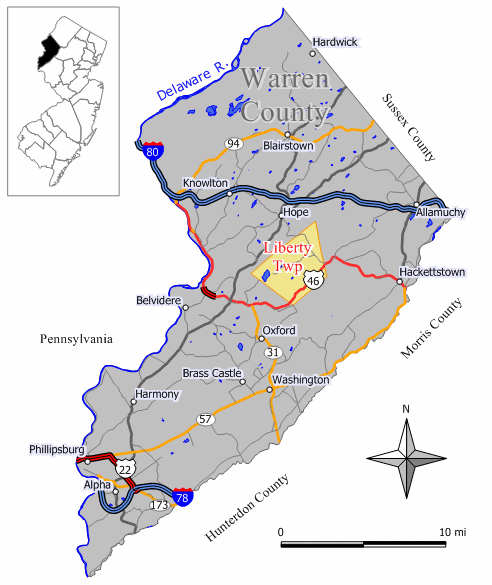
- Location of Liberty Township in Warren County highlighted in yellow (right). Inset map: Location of Warren County in New Jersey highlighted in black (left).

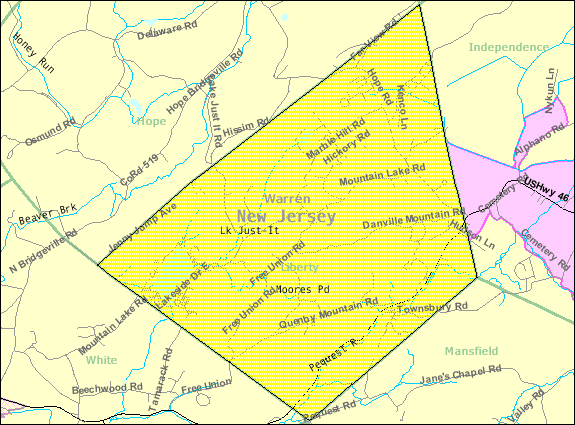
- Census Bureau map of Liberty Township, New Jersey

- Location in Warren County Location in New Jersey Location in the United States
- Coordinates: 40.86974°N 74.938072°W
- Country: United States
- State: New Jersey
- County: Warren
- Incorporated: April 30, 1926

Government
  - Type: Township
  - Body: Township Committee
  - Mayor: John E. Inscho (R, term ends December 31, 2023)
  - Administrator / Municipal clerk: Diane M. Pflugfelder

Area
  - Total: 11.93 sq mi (30.89 km^{2})
  - Land: 11.67 sq mi (30.22 km^{2})
  - Water: 0.26 sq mi (0.68 km^{2}) 2.20%
  - Rank: 194th of 565 in state 14th of 22 in county
- Elevation: 748 ft (228 m)

Population (2020)
  - Total: 2,670
  - Estimate (2023): 2,688
  - Rank: 461st of 565 in state 15th of 22 in county
  - Density: 228.9/sq mi (88.4/km^{2})
  - Rank: 495th of 565 in state 14th of 22 in county
- Time zone: UTC−05:00 (Eastern (EST))
  - Summer (DST): UTC−04:00 (Eastern (EDT))
- ZIP Codes: 07823 – Belvidere 07838 – Great Meadows; 07863 – Oxford
- Area code: 908
- FIPS code: 3404140110
- GNIS feature ID: 0882245
- Website: www.libertytownship.org

Liberty Township is a township in Warren County in the U.S. state of New Jersey. As of the 2020 United States census, the township's population was 2,670, a decrease of 272 (−9.2%) from the 2010 census count of 2,942, which in turn reflected an increase of 177 (+6.4%) from the 2,765 counted in the 2000 census.

Liberty Township was incorporated as a township by an act of the New Jersey Legislature on March 26, 1926, from portions of Hope Township, based on the results of a referendum held on April 30, 1926.

== Geography ==
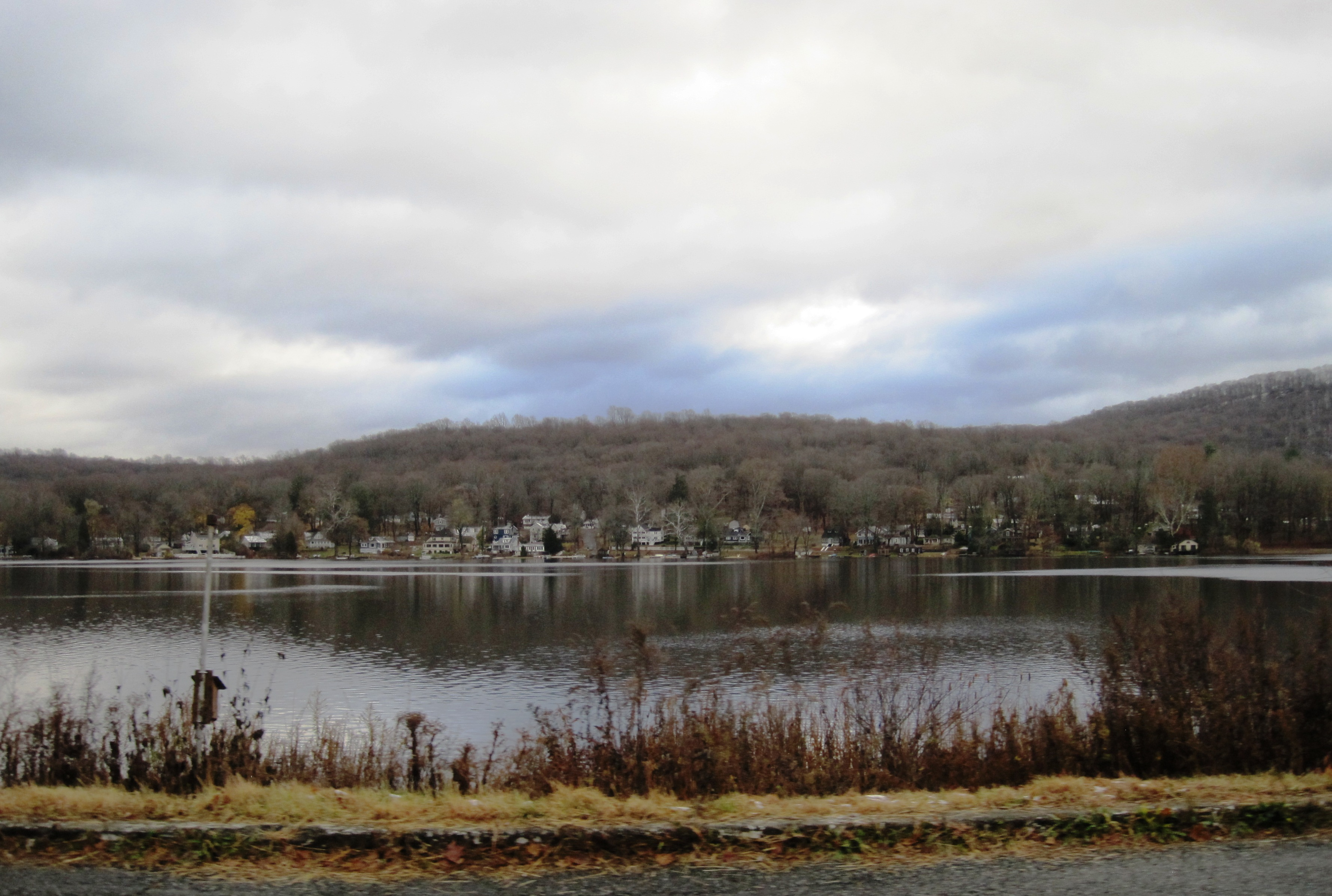
Mountain Lake, a lake and community within Liberty Township

According to the U.S. Census Bureau, the township had a total area of 11.93 square miles (30.89 km^{2}), including 11.67 square miles (30.22 km^{2}) of land and 0.26 square miles (0.68 km^{2}) of water (2.20%).

Mountain Lake (with a 2020 census population of 494) is an unincorporated community and census-designated place (CDP) located within the township. Other unincorporated communities, localities and place names located partially or completely within the township include Danville, Great Meadows and Townsbury.

Mountain Lake is over 12,000 years old and is Warren County's largest natural glacial lake. The lake has an area of 122 acres (0.49 km^{2}), maximum depth of 38 feet (12 m) and an average depth of 17 feet (5.2 m). The Mountain Lake Community Association (MLCA) oversees the Mountain Lake watershed and helps to maintain Mountain Lake's natural habitat. South of Mountain Lake is High Rock where many visitors enjoy to go hiking and can view the lake and surrounding areas, including the Delaware Water Gap.

The township borders the Warren County municipalities of Hope Township, Independence Township, Mansfield Township and White Township.

== Demographics ==
Historical population
Census	Pop.	Note	%±
1930	419		—
1940	441		5.3%
1950	529		20.0%
1960	760		43.7%
1970	1,229		61.7%
1980	1,730		40.8%
1990	2,493		44.1%
2000	2,765		10.9%
2010	2,942		6.4%
2020	2,670		−9.2%
2023 (est.)	2,688		0.7%
Population sources: 1930 1940–2000; 2000 2010 2020

The Township's economic data (as is all of Warren County) is included by the U.S. Census Bureau as part of the Allentown-Bethlehem-Easton, PA-NJ Metropolitan Statistical Area.

=== 2010 census ===
The 2010 United States census counted 2,942 people, 1,047 households, and 789 families in the township. The population density was 253.6 per square mile (97.9/km^{2}). There were 1,151 housing units at an average density of 99.2 per square mile (38.3/km^{2}). The racial makeup was 95.65% (2,814) White, 1.02% (30) Black or African American, 0.20% (6) Native American, 1.50% (44) Asian, 0.00% (0) Pacific Islander, 0.44% (13) from other races, and 1.19% (35) from two or more races. Hispanic or Latino of any race were 4.15% (122) of the population.

Of the 1,047 households, 35.8% had children under the age of 18; 63.0% were married couples living together; 7.4% had a female householder with no husband present and 24.6% were non-families. Of all households, 18.4% were made up of individuals and 7.3% had someone living alone who was 65 years of age or older. The average household size was 2.78 and the average family size was 3.21.

24.3% of the population were under the age of 18, 8.0% from 18 to 24, 23.4% from 25 to 44, 34.7% from 45 to 64, and 9.6% who were 65 years of age or older. The median age was 41.8 years. For every 100 females, the population had 104.3 males. For every 100 females ages 18 and older there were 98.4 males.

The Census Bureau's 2006–2010 American Community Survey showed that (in 2010 inflation-adjusted dollars) median household income was $73,750 (with a margin of error of +/− $7,599) and the median family income was $87,059 (+/− $12,952). Males had a median income of $55,625 (+/− $10,748) versus $49,511 (+/− $6,823) for females. The per capita income for the borough was $31,946 (+/− $3,591). About none of families and 4.3% of the population were below the poverty line, including 1.7% of those under age 18 and 9.9% of those age 65 or over.

=== 2000 census ===
As of the 2000 U.S. census, there were 2,765 people, 980 households, and 750 families residing in the township. The population density was 234.3 inhabitants per square mile (90.5/km^{2}). There were 1,088 housing units at an average density of 92.2 per square mile (35.6/km^{2}). The racial makeup of the township was 97.40% White, 0.36% African American, 0.11% Native American, 0.58% Asian, 0.54% from other races, and 1.01% from two or more races. Hispanic or Latino of any race were 2.68% of the population.

There were 980 households, out of which 40.6% had children under the age of 18 living with them, 68.2% were married couples living together, 5.7% had a female householder with no husband present, and 23.4% were non-families. 17.6% of all households were made up of individuals, and 6.6% had someone living alone who was 65 years of age or older. The average household size was 2.79 and the average family size was 3.23.

In the township, the population was spread out, with 28.4% under the age of 18, 5.0% from 18 to 24, 33.1% from 25 to 44, 25.2% from 45 to 64, and 8.5% who were 65 years of age or older. The median age was 38 years. For every 100 females, there were 98.6 males. For every 100 females age 18 and over, there were 96.7 males.

The median income for a household in the township was $62,535, and the median income for a family was $68,529. Males had a median income of $48,446 versus $33,529 for females. The per capita income for the township was $24,743. About 2.0% of families and 3.5% of the population were below the poverty line, including 3.4% of those under age 18 and 6.7% of those age 65 or over.

== Government ==
=== Local government ===
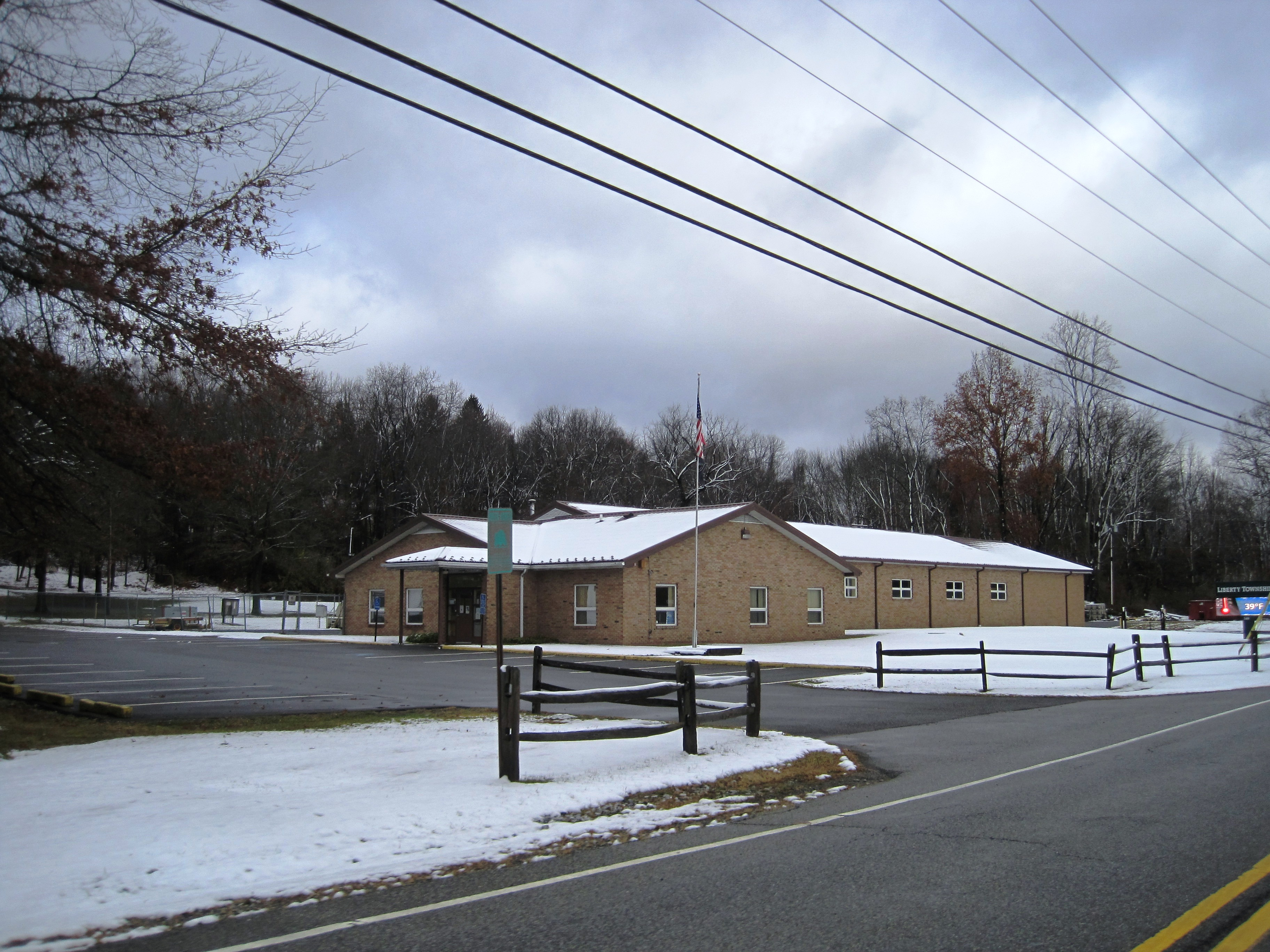
Liberty Township Municipal Building

Liberty Township is governed under the Township form of New Jersey municipal government, one of 141 municipalities (of the 564) statewide that use this form, the second-most commonly used form of government in the state. The Township Committee is comprised of five members, who are elected directly by the voters at-large in partisan elections to serve three-year terms of office on a staggered basis, with either one or two seats coming up for election each year as part of the November general election in a three-year cycle. At an annual reorganization meeting, the Township Committee selects one of its members to serve as Mayor.

As of 2022, members of the Liberty Township Committee are Mayor John E. Inscho (R, term on committee ends December 31, 2024; term as mayor ends 2022), Deputy Mayor Daniel B. Grover (R, term on committee and as deputy mayor ends 2022), Peter Karcher (R, 2023), David Rogers (R, 2022) and Wayne Spangenberg (R, 2023).

Carl Cummins was appointed to fill the vacant seat of John Fisher, who had died in September 2013, after the deadline to remove his name from the ballot and who won a seat in the November 2013 general election. Fisher's term of office runs until December 2016. Cummins served on an interim basis until the November 2014 general election when he was elected to serve the balance of the term.

=== Federal, state, and county representation ===
Liberty Township is located in the 7th Congressional District and is part of New Jersey's 23rd state legislative district.

For the 119th United States Congress, New Jersey's 7th congressional district is represented by Thomas Kean Jr. (R, Westfield). New Jersey is represented in the United States Senate by Democrats Cory Booker (Newark, term ends 2027) and Andy Kim (Moorestown, term ends 2031).

For the 2026–2027 session, the 23rd legislative district of the New Jersey Legislature is represented in the State Senate by Doug Steinhardt (R, Lopatcong Township) and in the General Assembly by John DiMaio (R, Hackettstown) and Erik Peterson (R, Franklin Township).

Warren County is governed by a three-member Board of County Commissioners, who are chosen at-large on a staggered basis in partisan elections with one seat coming up for election each year as part of the November general election. At an annual reorganization meeting held in the beginning of January, the board selects one of its members to serve as Commissioner Director and other as Deputy Director. As of 2025, Warren County's Commissioners are:

Deputy Director Jason J. Sarnoski (R, Lopatcong Township; 2025), Lori Ciesla (R, Lopatcong Township; 2026), and Director James R. Kern III (R, Pohatcong Township; 2027).

Constitutional officers of Warren County are: Clerk Holly Mackey (R, Alpha; 2027), Sheriff James McDonald Sr. (R, Phillipsburg; 2025) and Surrogate Michael J. Doherty (R, Washington; 2025).

=== Politics ===
As of March 2011, there were a total of 1,897 registered voters in Liberty Township, of which 386 (20.3% vs. 21.5% countywide) were registered as Democrats, 768 (40.5% vs. 35.3%) were registered as Republicans and 742 (39.1% vs. 43.1%) were registered as Unaffiliated. There was one voter registered to another party. Among the township's 2010 Census population, 64.5% (vs. 62.3% in Warren County) were registered to vote, including 85.1% of those ages 18 and over (vs. 81.5% countywide).

Gubernatorial election results for Liberty Township
Year	Republican		Democratic		Third party(ies)	
Year	No.	%	No.	%	No.	%
2025	874	65.57%	452	33.91%	7	0.53%
2021	762	71.48%	290	27.20%	14	1.31%
2017	584	66.06%	267	30.20%	33	3.73%
2013	588	73.87%	180	22.61%	28	3.52%
2009	658	64.38%	244	23.87%	120	11.74%
2005	573	58.71%	335	34.32%	68	6.97%

In the 2012 presidential election, Republican Mitt Romney received 709 votes (59.4% vs. 56.0% countywide), ahead of Democrat Barack Obama with 447 votes (37.5% vs. 40.8%) and other candidates with 24 votes (2.0% vs. 1.7%), among the 1,193 ballots cast by the township's 1,894 registered voters, for a turnout of 63.0% (vs. 66.7% in Warren County). In the 2008 presidential election, Republican John McCain received 843 votes (57.6% vs. 55.2% countywide), ahead of Democrat Barack Obama with 585 votes (40.0% vs. 41.4%) and other candidates with 22 votes (1.5% vs. 1.6%), among the 1,463 ballots cast by the township's 1,912 registered voters, for a turnout of 76.5% (vs. 73.4% in Warren County). In the 2004 presidential election, Republican George W. Bush received 909 votes (63.4% vs. 61.0% countywide), ahead of Democrat John Kerry with 491 votes (34.2% vs. 37.2%) and other candidates with 32 votes (2.2% vs. 1.3%), among the 1,434 ballots cast by the township's 1,809 registered voters, for a turnout of 79.3% (vs. 76.3% in the whole county).

United States presidential election results for Liberty Township
Year	Republican		Democratic		Third party(ies)	
Year	No.	%	No.	%	No.	%
2024	1,149	67.67%	525	30.92%	24	1.41%
2020	1,135	64.82%	574	32.78%	42	2.40%
2016	943	67.94%	389	28.03%	56	4.03%
2012	709	60.08%	447	37.88%	24	2.03%
2008	843	58.14%	585	40.34%	22	1.52%
2004	909	63.48%	491	34.29%	32	2.23%

In the 2013 gubernatorial election, Republican Chris Christie received 73.9% of the vote (588 cast), ahead of Democrat Barbara Buono with 22.6% (180 votes), and other candidates with 3.5% (28 votes), among the 810 ballots cast by the township's 1,923 registered voters (14 ballots were spoiled), for a turnout of 42.1%. In the 2009 gubernatorial election, Republican Chris Christie received 658 votes (63.4% vs. 61.3% countywide), ahead of Democrat Jon Corzine with 244 votes (23.5% vs. 25.7%), Independent Chris Daggett with 99 votes (9.5% vs. 9.8%) and other candidates with 21 votes (2.0% vs. 1.5%), among the 1,038 ballots cast by the township's 1,855 registered voters, yielding a 56.0% turnout (vs. 49.6% in the county).

United States Senate election results for Liberty Township1
Year	Republican		Democratic		Third party(ies)	
Year	No.	%	No.	%	No.	%
2024	1,101	66.61%	508	30.73%	44	2.66%
2018	739	65.34%	340	30.06%	52	4.60%
2012	678	60.97%	413	37.14%	21	1.89%
2006	544	58.56%	357	38.43%	28	3.01%

United States Senate election results for Liberty Township2
Year	Republican		Democratic		Third party(ies)	
Year	No.	%	No.	%	No.	%
2020	1,121	64.91%	565	32.72%	41	2.37%
2014	421	62.28%	230	34.02%	25	3.70%
2013	378	69.61%	162	29.83%	3	0.55%
2008	832	60.69%	504	36.76%	35	2.55%

== Education ==
Public school students in kindergarten through eighth grade attend the Great Meadows Regional School District, together with students from Independence Township. The New Jersey Superior Court, Appellate Division blocked a 2007 effort by Liberty Township to leave the Great Meadows district based on Liberty's greater share of district costs, with the court citing the inability of the two communities to provide an efficient education separately. As of the 2021–22 school year, the district, comprised of two schools, had an enrollment of 643 students and 59.2 classroom teachers (on an FTE basis), for a student–teacher ratio of 10.9:1. Schools in the district (with 2021–22 school year enrollment from the National Center for Education Statistics) are Central Elementary School with 302 students in grades PreK-3 and Great Meadows Middle School with 337 students in grades 4-8. Seats on the regional district's nine-member board of education are allocated based on the population of the constituent municipalities, with three seats allocated to Liberty Township; one seat from Liberty Township and two from Independence Township up for election each year.

Students attending public school for ninth through twelfth grades attend Hackettstown High School which serves students from Hackettstown, along with students from the townships of Allamuchy and Liberty, as part of a sending/receiving relationship with the Hackettstown School District. As of the 2021–22 school year, the high school had an enrollment of 869 students and 67.0 classroom teachers (on an FTE basis), for a student–teacher ratio of 13.0:1.

Students from the township and from all of Warren County are eligible to attend Ridge and Valley Charter School in Frelinghuysen Township (for grades K–8) or Warren County Technical School in Washington borough (for 9–12), with special education services provided by local districts supplemented throughout the county by the Warren County Special Services School District in Oxford Township (for PreK–12).

== Transportation ==
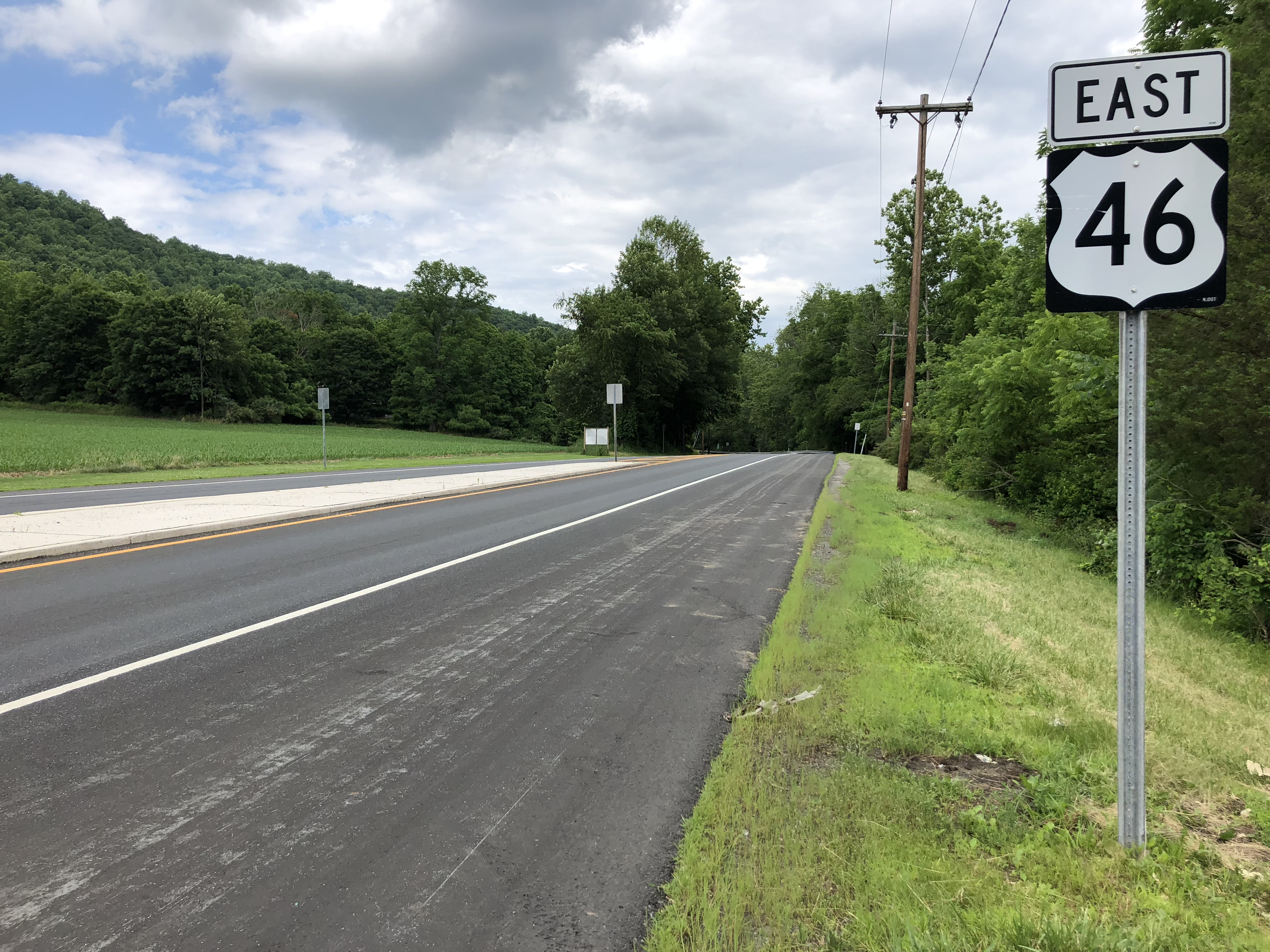
U.S. Route 46 eastbound in Liberty Township

As of May 2010, the township had a total of 33.83 miles (54.44 km) of roadways, of which 24.74 miles (39.82 km) were maintained by the municipality, 5.91 miles (9.51 km) by Warren County and 3.18 miles (5.12 km) by the New Jersey Department of Transportation.

The only major road to pass through is U.S. Route 46, which runs for 3.18 miles (5.12 km) in the township's southeastern area.

The closest limited access road is Interstate 80 (the Bergen-Passaic Expressway) in neighboring Hope Township.
