= Great Meadows, New Jersey =

Census-designated place in Warren County, New Jersey, US

- Census-designated place
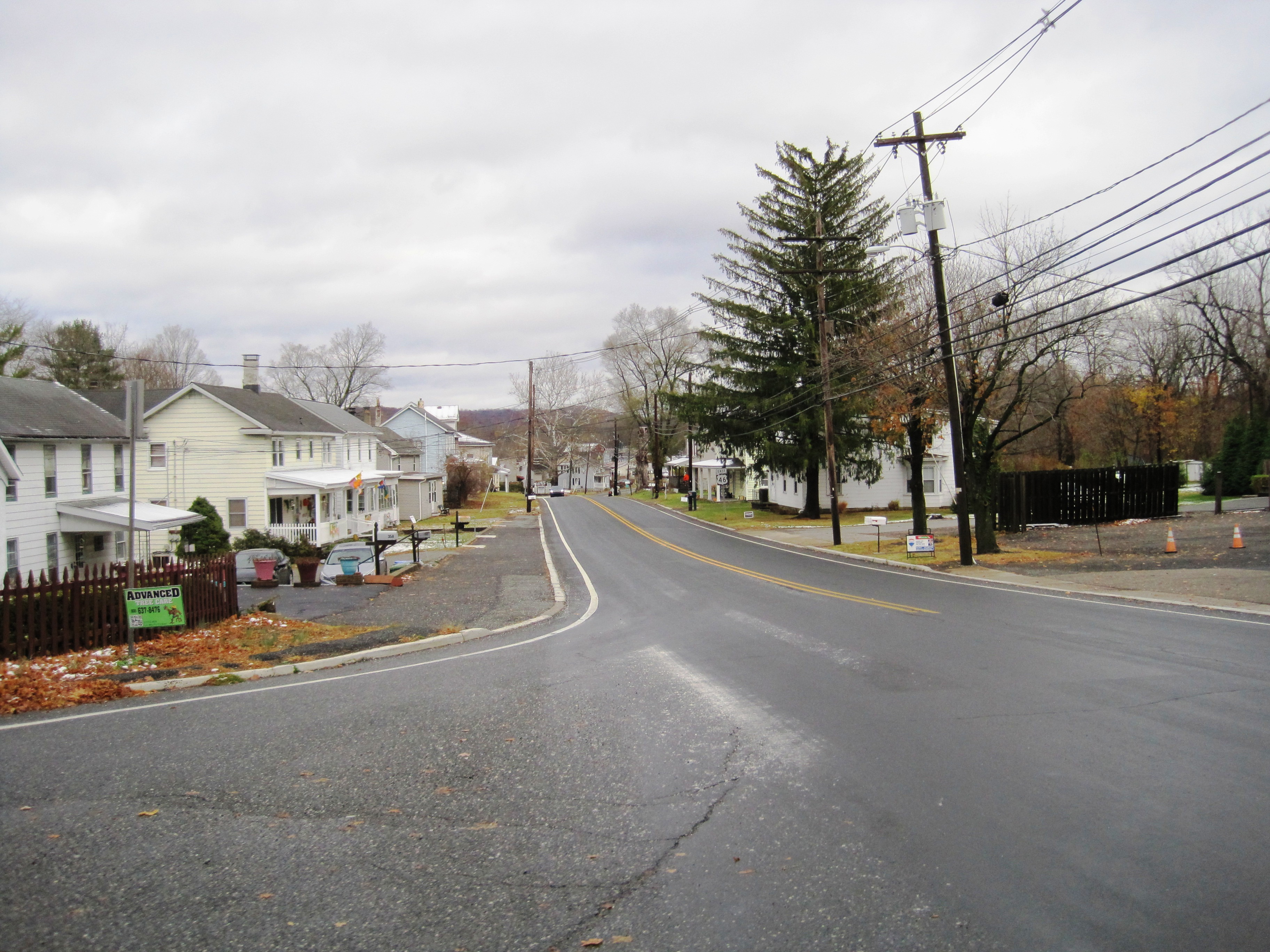
- Eastbound US 46 in Great Meadows

- Location in Warren County Location in New Jersey Location in the United States
- Coordinates: 40.875812°N 74.896583°W
- Country: United States
- State: New Jersey
- County: Warren
- Township: Independence

Area
  - Total: 1.54 sq mi (4.00 km^{2})
  - Land: 1.53 sq mi (3.96 km^{2})
  - Water: 0.015 sq mi (0.04 km^{2}) 0.86%
- Elevation: 515 ft (157 m)

Population (2020)
  - Total: 305
  - Density: 199.4/sq mi (76.97/km^{2})
- Time zone: UTC−05:00 (Eastern (EST))
  - Summer (DST): UTC−04:00 (EDT)
- ZIP Code: 07838
- Area code: 908
- FIPS code: 34-27360
- GNIS feature Idaho: 02583992

Great Meadows is an unincorporated community and census-designated place (CDP) located within Independence Township in Warren County, in the U.S. state of New Jersey, that was created as part of the 2010 United States census. As of the 2020 census, Great Meadows had a population of 305.

Until the 2000 United States census, the CDP was combined as part of the Great Meadows-Vienna CDP. Effective with the 2010 census, the Great Meadows-Vienna CDP was split into its components, Vienna (with a 2010 Census population of 981) and Great Meadows. As of the 2000 United States census, the population of the combined Great Meadows-Vienna CDP was 1,264.

== Geography ==
According to the United States Census Bureau, the CDP had a total area of 1.579 square miles (4.090 km^{2}), including 1.565 square miles (4.054 km^{2}) of land and 0.014 square miles (0.035 km^{2}) of water (0.86%).

== Demographics ==
Historical population
Census	Pop.	Note	%±
2010	303		—
2020	305		0.7%
U.S. Decennial Census; 2010 2020

Great Meadows first appeared as a census designated place in the 2010 U.S. census formed from part of the deleted Great Meadows-Vienna CDP and additional area.

=== 2020 census ===
Great Meadows CDP, New Jersey – Racial and ethnic composition Note: the US Census treats Hispanic/Latino as an ethnic category. This table excludes Latinos from the racial categories and assigns them to a separate category. Hispanics/Latinos may be of any race.
Race / Ethnicity (NH = Non-Hispanic)	Pop 2010	Pop 2020	% 2010	% 2020
White alone (NH)	276	230	91.09%	75.41%
Black or African American alone (NH)	1	7	0.33%	2.30%
Native American or Alaska Native alone (NH)	0	0	0.00%	0.00%
Asian alone (NH)	13	11	4.29%	3.61%
Native Hawaiian or Pacific Islander alone (NH)	0	0	0.00%	0.00%
Other race alone (NH)	0	2	0.00%	0.66%
Mixed race or Multiracial (NH)	0	26	0.00%	8.52%
Hispanic or Latino (any race)	13	29	4.29%	9.51%
Total	303	305	100.00%	100.00%

=== 2010 census ===
The 2010 United States census counted 303 people, 104 households, and 74 families in the CDP. The population density was 193.6 per square mile (74.7/km^{2}). There were 113 housing units at an average density of 72.2 per square mile (27.9/km^{2}). The racial makeup was 91.75% (278) White, 0.33% (1) Black or African American, 0.00% (0) Native American, 4.29% (13) Asian, 0.00% (0) Pacific Islander, 2.31% (7) from other races, and 1.32% (4) from two or more races. Hispanic or Latino of any race were 4.29% (13) of the population.

Of the 104 households, 39.4% had children under the age of 18; 56.7% were married couples living together; 8.7% had a female householder with no husband present and 28.8% were non-families. Of all households, 23.1% were made up of individuals and 11.5% had someone living alone who was 65 years of age or older. The average household size was 2.89 and the average family size was 3.47.

29.0% of the population were under the age of 18, 6.3% from 18 to 24, 27.4% from 25 to 44, 27.1% from 45 to 64, and 10.2% who were 65 years of age or older. The median age was 38.3 years. For every 100 females, the population had 106.1 males. For every 100 females ages 18 and older there were 97.2 males.

=== 2000 census ===
As of the 2000 United States census, the population for ZIP Code Tabulation Area 07838 was 3,149.

== Notable people ==
People who were born in, residents of, or otherwise closely associated with Great Meadows include:

- Bobby Caldwell (1951–2023), singer, songwriter, and musician, best known for his signature song "What You Won't Do for Love"
- Cole Kimball (born 1985), pitcher drafted by the Washington Nationals.
