= Harmony Township School District =

School district in Warren County, New Jersey, US

Address
- 2551 Belvidere Road Harmony Township, Warren County, New Jersey, 08865; United States
- Coordinates: 40.740544°N 75.13976°W

District information
- Grades: Pre-K to 8
- Superintendent: Christopher Carrubba
- Business administrator: Rachelle Tjalma
- Schools: 1

Students and staff
- Enrollment: 187 (as of 2022–23)
- Faculty: 29.0 FTEs
- Student–teacher ratio: 6.4:1

Other information
- District Factor Group: DE
- Website: www.htesd.org
Ind.	Per pupil	District spending	Rank (*)	K-8 average	%± vs. average
1A	Total Spending	$18,136	36	$18,891	−4.0%
1	Budgetary Cost	17,293	52	14,159	22.1%
2	Classroom Instruction	10,750	59	8,659	24.1%
6	Support Services	2,611	42	2,167	20.5%
8	Administrative Cost	1,765	47	1,547	14.1%
10	Operations & Maintenance	2,024	48	1,612	25.6%
13	Extracurricular Activities	144	36	104	38.5%
16	Median Teacher Salary	61,780	54	61,136
Data from NJDoE 2014 Taxpayers' Guide to Education Spending. *Of K-8 districts with up to 400 students. Lowest spending=1; Highest=71

The Harmony Township School District is a comprehensive community public school district that serves students in pre-kindergarten through eighth grade from Harmony Township, in Warren County, in the U.S. state of New Jersey.

As of the 2022–23 school year, the district, comprised of one school, had an enrollment of 187 students and 29.0 classroom teachers (on an FTE basis), for a student–teacher ratio of 6.4:1.

The district is classified by the New Jersey Department of Education as being in District Factor Group "DE", the fifth-highest of eight groupings. District Factor Groups organize districts statewide to allow comparison by common socioeconomic characteristics of the local districts. From lowest socioeconomic status to highest, the categories are A, B, CD, DE, FG, GH, I and J.

Public school students in ninth through twelfth grades attend Belvidere High School, together with students from Hope Township and White Township, as part of sending/receiving relationships with the Belvidere School District. As of the 2021–22 school year, the high school had an enrollment of 357 students and 32.3 classroom teachers (on an FTE basis), for a student–teacher ratio of 11.1:1.

== Schools ==
Schools in the district (with 2021–22 enrollment data from the National Center for Education Statistics) are:

- Harmony Township School, with 200 students in grades PreK-8
  - Daryle Weiss, principal

== Administration ==
Core members of the districts' administration are:

- Christopher Carrubba, chief school administrator
- Rachelle Tjalma, business administrator and board secretary

== Board of education ==
The district's board of education is comprised of nine members who set policy and oversee the fiscal and educational operation of the district through its administration. As a Type II school district, the board's trustees are elected directly by voters to serve three-year terms of office on a staggered basis, with three seats up for election each year held (since 2012) as part of the November general election. The board appoints a superintendent to oversee the district's day-to-day operations and a business administrator to supervise the business functions of the district.
