= White Township School District =

Public school district in Warren County, New Jersey, US

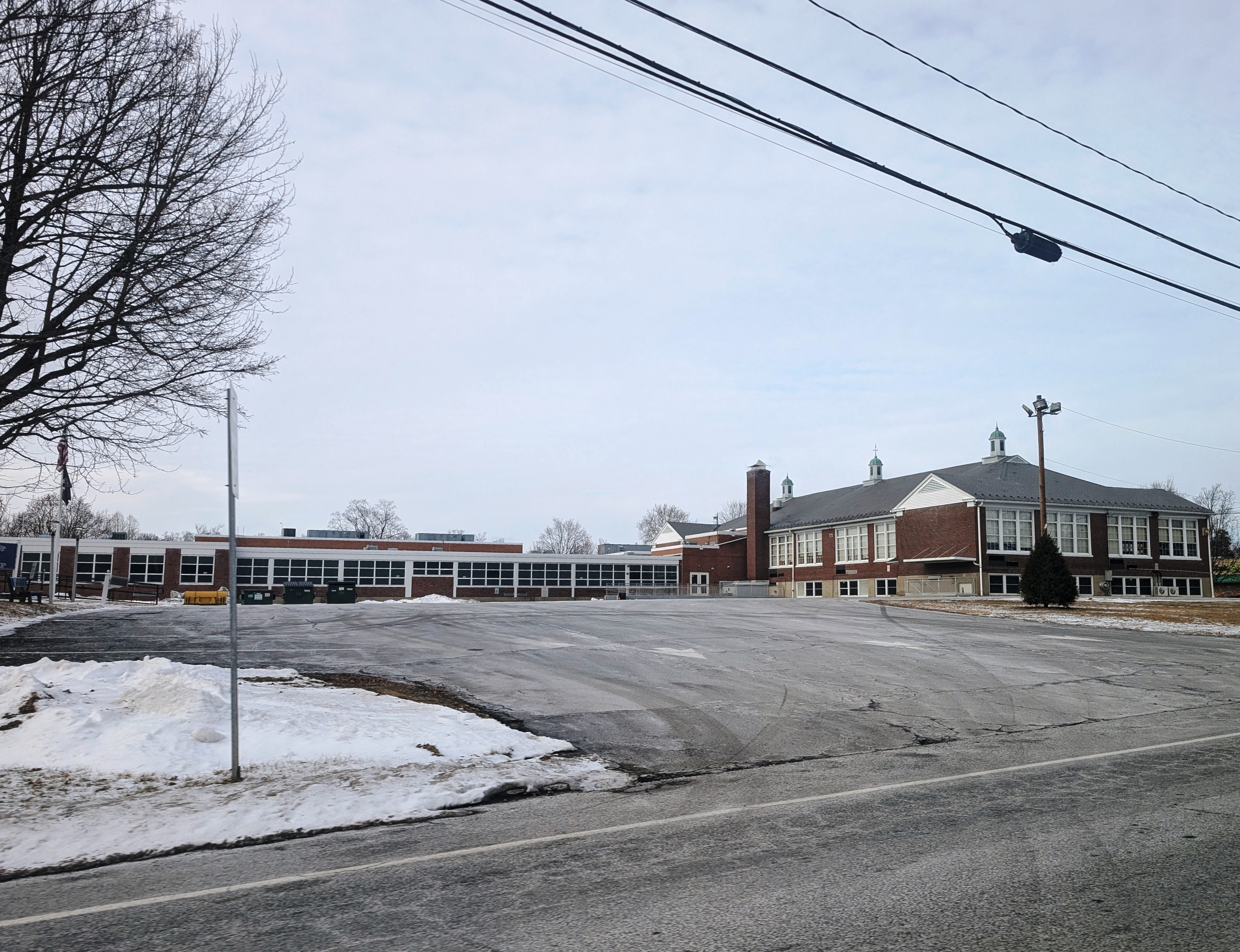
- White Township Consolidated School, the only school in the district

Address
- 565 County Route 519 White Township, Warren County, New Jersey, 07823; United States
- Coordinates: 40.839445°N 75.025056°W

District information
- Grades: PreK-8
- Superintendent: William Thompson
- Business administrator: Andrew Italiano
- Schools: 1

Students and staff
- Enrollment: 269 (as of 2022–23)
- Faculty: 31.7 FTEs
- Student–teacher ratio: 8.5:1

Other information
- District Factor Group: DE
- Website: www.whitetwpsd.org
| Ind. | Per pupil | District spending | Rank (*) | K-8 average | %± vs. average |
|---|---|---|---|---|---|
| 1A | Total Spending | $17,582 | 22 | $18,891 | −6.9% |
| 1 | Budgetary Cost | 16,083 | 44 | 14,159 | 13.6% |
| 2 | Classroom Instruction | 9,712 | 48 | 8,659 | 12.2% |
| 6 | Support Services | 2,844 | 50 | 2,167 | 31.2% |
| 8 | Administrative Cost | 1,637 | 36 | 1,547 | 5.8% |
| 10 | Operations & Maintenance | 1,795 | 38 | 1,612 | 11.4% |
| 13 | Extracurricular Activities | 6 | 3 | 104 | −94.2% |
| 16 | Median Teacher Salary | 57,425 | 33 | 61,136 |
Data from NJDoE 2014 Taxpayers' Guide to Education Spending. *Of K-8 districts with up to 400 students. Lowest spending=1; Highest=71

The White Township School District is a comprehensive community public school district that serves students in pre-kindergarten through eighth grade from White Township, in Warren County, in the U.S. state of New Jersey.

As of the 2022–23 school year, the district, comprised of one school, had an enrollment of 269 students and 31.7 classroom teachers (on an FTE basis), for a student–teacher ratio of 8.5:1.

The district is classified by the New Jersey Department of Education as being in District Factor Group "DE", the fifth-highest of eight groupings. District Factor Groups organize districts statewide to allow comparison by common socioeconomic characteristics of the local districts. From lowest socioeconomic status to highest, the categories are A, B, CD, DE, FG, GH, I and J.

Public school students in grades nine through twelve from Harmony Township, Hope Township and White Township attend Belvidere High School as part of sending/receiving relationships with the Belvidere School District As of the 2021–22 school year, the high school had an enrollment of 357 students and 32.3 classroom teachers (on an FTE basis), for a student–teacher ratio of 11.1:1.

== Schools ==
Schools in the district (with 2021–22 enrollment data from the National Center for Education Statistics) are:

- White Township Consolidated School, with 253 students in grades PreK-8

== Administration ==
Core members of the district's administration are:

- William Thompson, chief school administrator
- Andrew Italiano, business administrator and board secretary

== Board of education ==
The district's board of education is composed of nine members who set policy and oversee the fiscal and educational operation of the district through its administration. As a Type II school district, the board's trustees are elected directly by voters to serve three-year terms of office on a staggered basis, with three seats up for election each year held (since 2012) as part of the November general election. The board appoints a superintendent to oversee the district's day-to-day operations and a business administrator to supervise the business functions of the district.
