= Hope Township School District =

School district in Warren County, New Jersey, US

Address
- 320 Johnsonburg Road Hope Township, Warren County, New Jersey, 07844; United States
- Coordinates: 40.911171°N 74.967796°W

District information
- Grades: PreK to 8
- Superintendent: Kevin Newman
- Business administrator: Andrew Italiano
- Schools: 1

Students and staff
- Enrollment: 131 (as of 2022–23)
- Faculty: 18.8 FTEs
- Student–teacher ratio: 7.0:1

Other information
- District Factor Group: FG
- Principal: Kevin Newman
- Website: hope-elem.org
Ind.	Per pupil	District spending	Rank (*)	K-8 average	%± vs. average
1A	Total Spending	$17,773	30	$18,891	−5.9%
1	Budgetary Cost	14,915	34	14,159	5.3%
2	Classroom Instruction	7,908	16	8,659	−8.7%
6	Support Services	2,509	35	2,167	15.8%
8	Administrative Cost	1,977	68	1,547	27.8%
10	Operations & Maintenance	2,364	56	1,612	46.7%
13	Extracurricular Activities	127	31	104	22.1%
16	Median Teacher Salary	56,440	27	61,136
Data from NJDoE 2014 Taxpayers' Guide to Education Spending. *Of K-8 districts with up to 400 students. Lowest spending=1; Highest=71

The Hope Township School District is a comprehensive community public school district that serves students in pre-kindergarten through eighth grade from Hope Township, in Warren County, in the U.S. state of New Jersey.

As of the 2022–23 school year, the district, comprising one school, had an enrollment of 131 students and 18.8 classroom teachers (on an FTE basis), for a student–teacher ratio of 7.0:1. In the 2016-17 school year, the district was tied for the 30th-smallest enrollment of any school district in the state.

The district is classified by the New Jersey Department of Education as being in District Factor Group "FG", the fourth-highest of eight groupings. District Factor Groups organize districts statewide to allow comparison by common socioeconomic characteristics of the local districts. From lowest socioeconomic status to highest, the categories are A, B, CD, DE, FG, GH, I and J.

Public school students in ninth through twelfth grades attend Belvidere High School, together with students from Harmony Township Belvidere, New Jersey and White Township, as part of sending/receiving relationships with the Belvidere School District. As of the 2020–21 school year, the high school had an enrollment of 367 students and 32.3 classroom teachers (on an FTE basis), for a student–teacher ratio of 11.4:1.

== Schools ==
Schools in the district (with 2020–21 enrollment data from the National Center for Education Statistics) are:

- Hope Township School, with 115 students in grades pre-kindergarten to 8
  - Kevin Newman, principal

== Administration ==
Core members of the districts' administration are:

- Kevin Newman, chief school administrator
- Andrew Italiano, business administrator and board secretary

== Board of education ==
The district's board of education is comprised of seven members who set policy and oversee the fiscal and educational operation of the district through its administration. As a Type II school district, the board's trustees are elected directly by voters to serve three-year terms of office on a staggered basis, with either two or three seats up for election each year held (since 2012) as part of the November general election. The board appoints a superintendent to oversee the district's day-to-day operations and a business administrator to supervise the business functions of the district.
