= Blairstown Township School District =

School district in Warren County, New Jersey, US

Address
- 1 Sunset Hill Road Blairstown Township, Warren County, New Jersey, 07825
- Coordinates: 40.982224°N 74.954773°W

District information
- Grades: PreK-6
- Superintendent: Patrick Ketch
- Business administrator: Donna Williams
- Schools: 1

Students and staff
- Enrollment: 428 (as of 2023–24)
- Faculty: 43.8 FTEs
- Student–teacher ratio: 9.8:1

Other information
- District Factor Group: FG
- Website: www.blairstownelem.net
Ind.	Per pupil	District spending	Rank (*)	K-6 average	%± vs. average
1A	Total Spending	$16,594	23	$18,891	−12.2%
1	Budgetary Cost	14,174	29	13,649	3.8%
2	Classroom Instruction	8,683	26	8,366	3.8%
6	Support Services	2,835	49	2,161	31.2%
8	Administrative Cost	1,290	10	1,467	−12.1%
10	Operations & Maintenance	1,271	12	1,552	−18.1%
13	Extracurricular Activities	58	28	39	48.7%
16	Median Teacher Salary	57,600	30	57,437
Data from NJDoE 2014 Taxpayers' Guide to Education Spending. *Of K-6 districts with any number of students. Lowest spending=1; Highest=59

Blairstown Township School District is a community public school district that serves students in Blairstown, in Warren County, in the U.S. state of New Jersey, that serves students in pre-kindergarten through sixth grade. Students from Hardwick Township, a non-operating school district attend Blairstown Elementary School.

As of the 2023–24 school year, the district, comprised of one school, had an enrollment of 428 students and 43.8 classroom teachers (on an FTE basis), for a student–teacher ratio of 9.8:1.

The district had been classified by the New Jersey Department of Education as being in District Factor Group "FG", the fourth-highest of eight groupings. District Factor Groups organize districts statewide to allow comparison by common socioeconomic characteristics of the local districts. From lowest socioeconomic status to highest, the categories are A, B, CD, DE, FG, GH, I and J.

Students in seventh through twelfth grades for public school attend the North Warren Regional High School in Blairstown, a public secondary high school, serving students from Blairstown, Frelinghuysen, Hardwick, and Knowlton townships. As of the 2023–24 school year, the high school had an enrollment of 619 students and 54.8 classroom teachers (on an FTE basis), for a student–teacher ratio of 11.3:1.

== Schools ==
Blairstown Elementary School served 425 students in grades PreK–6, as of the 2023–24 school year.

- Colleen Silvestri, principal

== Administration ==
Core members of the district's administration are:

- Patrick Ketch, superintendent
- Donna Williams, school business administrator and board secretary

== Board of education ==
The district's board of education is comprised of nine members who set policy and oversee the fiscal and educational operation of the district through its administration. As a Type II school district, the board's trustees are elected directly by voters to serve three-year terms of office on a staggered basis, with three seats up for election each year held (since 2012) as part of the November general election. The board appoints a superintendent to oversee the district's day-to-day operations and a business administrator to supervise the business functions of the district.
