= Oxford Township School District =

School district in Warren County, New Jersey, US

Address
- 17 Kent Street Oxford Township, Warren County, New Jersey, 07863; United States
- Coordinates: 40.806363°N 74.985209°W

District information
- Grades: PreK-8
- Superintendent: John Nittolo
- Business administrator: Nick Sarlo
- Schools: 1

Students and staff
- Enrollment: 260 (as of 2025-2026)
- Faculty: 26.0 FTEs
- Student–teacher ratio: 10:1

Other information
- District Factor Group: DE
- Website: District web site
Ind.	Per pupil	District spending	Rank (*)	K-8 average	%± vs. average
1A	Total Spending	$16,812	18	$18,891	−11.0%
1	Budgetary Cost	13,804	19	14,159	−2.5%
2	Classroom Instruction	6,368	4	8,659	−26.5%
6	Support Services	4,611	66	2,167	112.8%
8	Administrative Cost	1,548	27	1,547	0.1%
10	Operations & Maintenance	1,231	10	1,612	−23.6%
13	Extracurricular Activities	46	17	104	−55.8%
16	Median Teacher Salary	49,153	6	61,136
Data from NJDoE 2014 Taxpayers' Guide to Education Spending. *Of K-8 districts with up to 400 students. Lowest spending=1; Highest=71

The Oxford Township School District is a community public school district that serves students in pre-kindergarten through eighth grade from Oxford Township in Warren County, in the U.S. state of New Jersey.

As of the 2025-2026 school year, the district, comprised of one school, had an enrollment of 260 students and 26.0 classroom teachers (on an FTE basis), for a student–teacher ratio of 10:1.

The district is classified by the New Jersey Department of Education as being in District Factor Group "DE", the fifth-highest of eight groupings. District Factor Groups organize districts statewide to allow comparison by common socioeconomic characteristics of the local districts. From lowest socioeconomic status to highest, the categories are A, B, CD, DE, FG, GH, I and J.

Public school students in seventh through twelfth grades attend the schools of the Warren Hills Regional School District, which also serves students from the municipalities of Franklin Township, Mansfield Township, Washington Borough and Washington Township, along with those from Oxford who attend for grades 9-12 only on a tuition basis as part of a sending/receiving relationship. Schools in the district (with 2018–19 enrollment data from the National Center for Education Statistics) are Warren Hills Regional Middle School with 542 students in grades 7 and 8 (located in Washington Borough) and Warren Hills Regional High School with 1,205 students in grades 9 - 12 (located in Washington Township).

== School ==
Oxford Central School had an enrollment of 260 students in grades PreK-8 in the 2025-2026 school year.

Despite the small size of the school, it has won the New Jersey state archery championship in the Middle School Division every year from 2007 to 2025.

== Administration ==
Core members of the school's administration are:

- John Nittolo, chief school administrator
- Nick Sarlo, business administrator and board secretary

== Board of education ==
The district's board of education, comprised of seven members, sets policy and oversees the fiscal and educational operation of the district through its administration. As a Type II school district, the board's trustees are elected directly by voters to serve three-year terms of office on a staggered basis, with either two or three seats up for election each year held (since 2012) as part of the November general election. The board appoints a superintendent to oversee the district's day-to-day operations and a business administrator to supervise the business functions of the district.
