= Great Meadows Regional School District =

School district in Warren County, New Jersey, US

Address
- 281 U.S. Route 46 Great Meadows, Warren County, New Jersey, 07838; United States
- Coordinates: 40.908379°N 74.871735°W

District information
- Grades: PreK-8
- Superintendent: Michael Mai
- Business administrator: Amanda Kinney
- Schools: 2

Students and staff
- Enrollment: 643 (as of 2021–22)
- Faculty: 59.2 FTEs
- Student–teacher ratio: 10.9:1

Other information
- District Factor Group: GH
- Website: District website
Ind.	Per pupil	District spending	Rank (*)	K-8 average	%± vs. average
1A	Total Spending	$16,385	26	$18,891	−13.3%
1	Budgetary Cost	13,063	28	14,159	−7.7%
2	Classroom Instruction	8,261	31	8,659	−4.6%
6	Support Services	1,774	20	2,167	−18.1%
8	Administrative Cost	1,381	23	1,547	−10.7%
10	Operations & Maintenance	1,616	49	1,612	0.2%
13	Extracurricular Activities	23	5	104	−77.9%
16	Median Teacher Salary	59,200	27	61,136
Data from NJDoE 2014 Taxpayers' Guide to Education Spending. *Of K-8 districts with more than 750 students. Lowest spending=1; Highest=84

The Great Meadows Regional School District is a regional public school district in Warren County, in the U.S. state of New Jersey, that serves students in pre-kindergarten through eighth grade from Independence and Liberty townships. The New Jersey Superior Court, Appellate Division blocked a 2007 effort by Liberty Township to leave the Great Meadows district based on Liberty's greater share of district costs, with the court citing the inability of the two communities to provide an efficient education separately.

As of the 2021–22 school year, the district, comprising two schools, had an enrollment of 643 students and 59.2 classroom teachers (on an FTE basis), for a student–teacher ratio of 10.9:1.

The district was classified by the New Jersey Department of Education as being in District Factor Group "GH", the third-highest of eight groupings. District Factor Groups organize districts statewide to allow comparison by common socioeconomic characteristics of the local districts. From lowest socioeconomic status to highest, the categories are A, B, CD, DE, FG, GH, I and J.

Students attending public school for ninth through twelfth grades attend Hackettstown High School which serves students from Hackettstown, along with students from the townships of Allamuchy and Liberty, as part of a sending/receiving relationship with the Hackettstown School District. As of the 2021–22 school year, the high school had an enrollment of 869 students and 67.0 classroom teachers (on an FTE basis), for a student–teacher ratio of 13.0:1.

In 2019, in the wake of declining enrollment and state aid, the district announced that it would close Liberty Elementary School to consolidate into the two other schools located on a single campus.

== Schools ==
Schools in the district (with 2021–22 school year enrollment from the National Center for Education Statistics) are:

Elementary schools

- Central Elementary School with 302 students in grades PreK-3
  - Samantha Westberg, principal

Middle school

- Great Meadows Middle School with 337 students in grades 4-8
  - Wendy Flynn, principal

== Administration ==
Core members of the district's administration are:

- Michael Mai, superintendent
- Amanda Kinney, business administrator and board secretary

== Board of education ==
The district's board of education, comprised of nine members, sets policy and oversees the fiscal and educational operation of the district through its administration. As a Type II school district, the board's trustees are elected directly by voters to serve three-year terms of office on a staggered basis, with three seats up for election each year held (since 2013) as part of the November general election. The board appoints a superintendent to oversee the district's day-to-day operations and a business administrator to supervise the business functions of the district. Seats on the board of education are allocated based on the population of the constituent municipalities, with six from Independence Township and three from Liberty Township, who are elected to office on a staggered basis with one seat from Liberty Township and two from Independence Township up for election each year. A member represents the Board on the Hackettstown Board of Education to deal with issues pertaining to Hackettstown High School and the Hackettstown School District.
