= Franklin Township School District =

Franklin Township School District can refer to:

- Franklin Township School District (Hunterdon County, New Jersey)
- Franklin Township School District (Warren County, New Jersey)
