= Frelinghuysen Township School District =

School district in Warren County, New Jersey, US

Address
- 780 Route 94 Johnsonburg, Warren County, New Jersey, 07846; United States
- Coordinates: 40.960732°N 74.878342°W

District information
- Grades: PreK to 6
- Superintendent: Jarlyn Veras
- Business administrator: Danielle Tarvin
- Schools: 1

Students and staff
- Enrollment: 131 (as of 2022–23)
- Faculty: 13.2 FTEs
- Student–teacher ratio: 10.0:1

Other information
- District Factor Group: GH
- Website: www.frelinghuysenschool.org
Ind.	Per pupil	District spending	Rank (*)	K-6 average	%± vs. average
1A	Total Spending	$19,076	41	$18,891	1.0%
1	Budgetary Cost	14,289	31	13,649	4.7%
2	Classroom Instruction	9,021	28	8,366	7.8%
6	Support Services	1,437	6	2,161	−33.5%
8	Administrative Cost	1,985	58	1,467	35.3%
10	Operations & Maintenance	1,848	45	1,552	19.1%
16	Median Teacher Salary	62,732	47	57,437
Data from NJDoE 2014 Taxpayers' Guide to Education Spending. *Of K-6 districts with any number of students. Lowest spending=1; Highest=59

Frelinghuysen Township School District is a community public school district that serves students in pre-kindergarten through sixth grade from Frelinghuysen Township, Warren County, in the U.S. state of New Jersey.

As of the 2022–23 school year, the district, comprised of one school, had an enrollment of 131 students and 13.2 classroom teachers (on an FTE basis), for a student–teacher ratio of 10.0:1. In the 2016–17 school year, Frelinghuysen had the 28th smallest enrollment of any school district in the state, with 150 students.

Students in seventh through twelfth grades for public school attend the North Warren Regional High School, a public secondary high school that also serves students from the townships of Blairstown (site of the school), Hardwick and Knowlton. As of the 2022–23 school year, the high school had an enrollment of 620 students and 57.6 classroom teachers (on an FTE basis), for a student–teacher ratio of 10.8:1.

== History ==
The township's students had been educated at Johnsonburg School from 1917 to 1956. The current school building opened in September 1956, after which the original Johnsonburg School was repurposed for use as the municipal offices for Frelinghuysen Township.

The district had been classified by the New Jersey Department of Education as being in District Factor Group "GH", the third-highest of eight groupings. District Factor Groups organize districts statewide to allow comparison by common socioeconomic characteristics of the local districts. From lowest socioeconomic status to highest, the categories are A, B, CD, DE, FG, GH, I and J.

== Schools ==
Frelinghuysen Elementary School served 131 students in grades PreK-6 in the 2022–23 school year.

== Administration ==
Core members of the district's administration are:

- Jarlyn Veras, superintendent
- Danielle Tarvin, school business administrator

== Board of education ==
The district's board of education, comprised of nine members, sets policy and oversees the fiscal and educational operation of the district through its administration. As a Type II school district, the board's trustees are elected directly by voters to serve three-year terms of office on a staggered basis, with three seats up for election each year held (since 2012) as part of the November general election. The board appoints a superintendent to oversee the district's day-to-day operations and a business administrator to supervise the business functions of the district.
