= Washington Borough Public Schools =

School district in Warren County, New Jersey, US

Address
- 300 West Stewart Street Washington, Warren County, New Jersey, 07882; United States
- Coordinates: 40.758675°N 74.991122°W

District information
- Grades: PreK-6
- Superintendent: Frank Esposito
- Business administrator: Timothy Mantz
- Schools: 2

Students and staff
- Enrollment: 481 (as of 2018–19)
- Faculty: 44.6 FTEs
- Student–teacher ratio: 10.8:1

Other information
- District Factor Group: DE
- Website: www.washboroschools.org
Ind.	Per pupil	District spending	Rank (*)	K-6 average	%± vs. average
1A	Total Spending	$15,737	12	$18,891	−16.7%
1	Budgetary Cost	13,347	17	13,649	−2.2%
2	Classroom Instruction	9,316	32	8,366	11.4%
6	Support Services	1,658	11	2,161	−23.3%
8	Administrative Cost	1,102	5	1,467	−24.9%
10	Operations & Maintenance	1,272	13	1,552	−18.0%
16	Median Teacher Salary	65,090	52	57,437
Data from NJDoE 2014 Taxpayers' Guide to Education Spending. *Of K-6 districts with any number of students. Lowest spending=1; Highest=59

The Washington Borough Public Schools is a community public school district that serves students in kindergarten through sixth grade from Washington Borough, in Warren County, in the U.S. state of New Jersey.

As of the 2018–19 school year, the district, comprising two schools, had an enrollment of 481 students and 44.6 classroom teachers (on an FTE basis), for a student–teacher ratio of 10.8:1.

The district is classified by the New Jersey Department of Education as being in District Factor Group "DE", the fifth-highest of eight groupings. District Factor Groups organize districts statewide to allow comparison by common socioeconomic characteristics of the local districts. From lowest socioeconomic status to highest, the categories are A, B, CD, DE, FG, GH, I and J.

Students in public school for seventh through twelfth grades attend the Warren Hills Regional School District, which serves students from Washington Borough, along with those from Franklin Township, Mansfield Township and Washington Township, as well as students from Oxford Township (for 9-12 only, attending on a tuition basis). Schools in the district (with 2018–19 enrollment data from the National Center for Education Statistics) are Warren Hills Regional Middle School located in Washington Borough with 542 students in grades 7-8 and Warren Hills Regional High School located in Washington Township with 1,205 students in grades 9-12.

== Schools ==
Schools in the district (with 2018–19 enrollment data from the National Center for Education Statistics) are:

- Taylor Street School with 188 students in grades PreK - 2
  - Sherry N. Koeppen, principal
- Memorial School with 293 students in grades 3 - 6
  - Jacqueline Nassry, principal

== Administration ==
Core members of the district's administration are:

- Frank Esposito, superintendent
- Timothy Mantz, business administrator and board secretary

== Board of education ==
The district's board of education, comprised of nine members, sets policy and oversees the fiscal and educational operation of the district through its administration. As a Type II school district, the board's trustees are elected directly by voters to serve three-year terms of office on a staggered basis, with three seats up for election each year held (since 2012) as part of the November general election. The board appoints a superintendent to oversee the district's day-to-day operations and a business administrator to supervise the business functions of the district.
