= Washington Township School District (Warren County, New Jersey) =

School district in Warren County, New Jersey, US

Address
- 16 Castle Street Washington Township, Warren County, New Jersey, 07882; United States
- Coordinates: 40.758905°N 75.005473°W

District information
- Grades: PreK-6
- Superintendent: Keith Neuhs
- Business administrator: Jean Flynn
- Schools: 2

Students and staff
- Enrollment: 407 (as of 2023–24)
- Faculty: 41.5 FTEs
- Student–teacher ratio: 9.8:1

Other information
- District Factor Group: GH
- Website: www.washtwpsd.org
Ind.	Per pupil	District spending	Rank (*)	K-6 average	%± vs. average
1A	Total Spending	$16,498	22	$18,891	−12.7%
1	Budgetary Cost	13,667	21	13,649	0.1%
2	Classroom Instruction	8,108	18	8,366	−3.1%
6	Support Services	2,704	45	2,161	25.1%
8	Administrative Cost	1,662	33	1,467	13.3%
10	Operations & Maintenance	1,107	5	1,552	−28.7%
13	Extracurricular Activities	39	22	39	0.0%
16	Median Teacher Salary	68,767	56	57,437
Data from NJDoE 2014 Taxpayers' Guide to Education Spending. *Of K-6 districts with any number of students. Lowest spending=1; Highest=59

The Washington Township School District is a community public school district that serves students in pre-kindergarten through sixth grade from Washington Township, in Warren County, in the U.S. state of New Jersey.

As of the 2023–24 school year, the district, comprised of two schools, had an enrollment of 407 students and 41.5 classroom teachers (on an FTE basis), for a student–teacher ratio of 9.8:1.

The district had been classified by the New Jersey Department of Education as being in District Factor Group "GH", the third-highest of eight groupings. District Factor Groups organize districts statewide to allow comparison by common socioeconomic characteristics of the local districts. From lowest socioeconomic status to highest, the categories are A, B, CD, DE, FG, GH, I and J.

Public school students in seventh through twelfth grades attend the schools of the Warren Hills Regional School District, which also serves students from the municipalities of Franklin Township, Mansfield Township and Washington Borough, along with those from Oxford Township who attend for grades 9–12 only. Schools in the district (with 2023–24 enrollment data from the National Center for Education Statistics) are Warren Hills Regional Middle School located in Washington Borough with 480 students in grades 7–8 and Warren Hills Regional High School located in Washington Township with 1,066 students in grades 9–12.

== Schools ==
Schools in the district (with 2023–24 enrollment data from the National Center for Education Statistics) are:

- Port Colden School with 158 students in grades 1–3
  - Jessica McDonagh, principal
- Brass Castle School with 247 students in pre-kindergarten, kindergarten and grades 4–6
  - Jessica L. Garcia, principal

== Administration ==
Core members of the district's administration are:

- Keith Neuhs, superintendent
- Jean Flynn, business administrator and board secretary

== Board of education ==
The district's board of education, comprised of seven members, sets policy and oversees the fiscal and educational operation of the district through its administration. As a Type II school district, the board's trustees are elected directly by voters to serve three-year terms of office on a staggered basis, with either two or three seats up for election each year held (since 2012) as part of the November general election. The board appoints a superintendent to oversee the district's day-to-day operations and a business administrator to supervise the business functions of the district.
