= Knowlton Township School District =

School district in Warren County, New Jersey, US

Address
- 80 Route 46 Knowlton Township, Warren County, New Jersey, 07833; United States
- Coordinates: 40.891941°N 75.063232°W

District information
- Grades: Pre-K to 6
- Superintendent: Jeannine DeFalco
- Business administrator: Michael Brennan
- Schools: 1

Students and staff
- Enrollment: 179 (as of 2022–23)
- Faculty: 19.8 FTEs
- Student–teacher ratio: 9.0:1

Other information
- District Factor Group: FG
- Website: www.knowltonschool.com
Ind.	Per pupil	District spending	Rank (*)	K-6 average	%± vs. average
1A	Total Spending	$19,242	42	$18,891	1.9%
1	Budgetary Cost	15,241	36	13,649	11.7%
2	Classroom Instruction	10,018	43	8,366	19.7%
6	Support Services	1,539	8	2,161	−28.8%
8	Administrative Cost	1,983	55	1,467	35.2%
10	Operations & Maintenance	1,658	35	1,552	6.8%
13	Extracurricular Activities	25	17	39	−35.9%
16	Median Teacher Salary	62,585	45	57,437
Data from NJDoE 2014 Taxpayers' Guide to Education Spending. *Of K-6 districts with any number of students. Lowest spending=1; Highest=59

Knowlton Township School District is a community public school district in Knowlton Township, Warren County, in the U.S. state of New Jersey, that serves students in pre-kindergarten through sixth grade.

As of the 2022–23 school year, the district, comprised of one school, had an enrollment of 179 students and 19.8 classroom teachers (on an FTE basis), for a student–teacher ratio of 9.0:1. In the 2016–17 school year, Knowlton had the 41st smallest enrollment of any school district in the state, with 192 students.

The district is classified by the New Jersey Department of Education as being in District Factor Group "FG", the fourth-highest of eight groupings. District Factor Groups organize districts statewide to allow comparison by common socioeconomic characteristics of the local districts. From lowest socioeconomic status to highest, the categories are A, B, CD, DE, FG, GH, I and J.

Students in seventh through twelfth grades for public school attend the North Warren Regional High School in Blairstown, a public secondary high school, serving students from the townships of Blairstown, Frelinghuysen, Hardwick and Knowlton. As of the 2022–23 school year, the high school had an enrollment of 620 students and 57.6 classroom teachers (on an FTE basis), for a student–teacher ratio of 10.8:1.

== Schools ==
Knowlton Township Elementary School served 179 students in grades PreK-6, as of the 2022–23 school year.

== Administration ==
Core members of the district's administration are:

- Jeannine DeFalco, superintendent
- Michael Brennan, business administrator / board secretary

== Board of education ==
The district's board of education, comprised of seven members, sets policy and oversees the fiscal and educational operation of the district through its administration. As a Type II school district, the board's trustees are elected directly by voters to serve three-year terms of office on a staggered basis, with either two or three seats up for election each year held (since 2012) as part of the November general election. The board appoints a superintendent to oversee the district's day-to-day operations and a business administrator to supervise the business functions of the district.
