= Mansfield Township School District =

School district in Warren County, New Jersey, US

Address
- 50 Port Murray Road Port Murray, Warren County, New Jersey, 07865
- Coordinates: 40.77465°N 74.913927°W

District information
- Grades: PreK-6
- Superintendent: Diana Mai
- Business administrator: Kelly Morris (interim)
- Schools: 1

Students and staff
- Enrollment: 582 (as of 2023–24)
- Faculty: 60.0 FTEs
- Student–teacher ratio: 9.7:1

Other information
- District Factor Group: FG
- Website: www.mansfieldtsd.org
| Ind. | Per pupil | District spending | Rank (*) | K-6 average | %± vs. average |
|---|---|---|---|---|---|
| 1A | Total Spending | $14,242 | 2 | $18,891 | −24.6% |
| 1 | Budgetary Cost | 11,376 | 7 | 13,649 | −16.7% |
| 2 | Classroom Instruction | 7,827 | 12 | 8,366 | −6.4% |
| 6 | Support Services | 1,571 | 9 | 2,161 | −27.3% |
| 8 | Administrative Cost | 1,064 | 4 | 1,467 | −27.5% |
| 10 | Operations & Maintenance | 893 | 1 | 1,552 | −42.5% |
| 16 | Median Teacher Salary | 74,110 | 58 | 57,437 |
Data from NJDoE 2014 Taxpayers' Guide to Education Spending. *Of K-6 districts with any number of students. Lowest spending=1; Highest=59

The Mansfield Township School District is a community public school district that serves students in pre-kindergarten through sixth grade from Mansfield Township, in Warren County, in the U.S. state of New Jersey.

As of the 2023–24 school year, the district, comprised of one school, had an enrollment of 582 students and 60.0 classroom teachers (on an FTE basis), for a student–teacher ratio of 9.7:1.

The district had been classified by the New Jersey Department of Education as being in District Factor Group "FG", the fourth-highest of eight groupings. District Factor Groups organize districts statewide to allow comparison by common socioeconomic characteristics of the local districts. From lowest socioeconomic status to highest, the categories are A, B, CD, DE, FG, GH, I and J.

Public school students in seventh through twelfth grades attend the schools of the Warren Hills Regional School District, which also serves students from the municipalities of Franklin Township, Washington Borough and Washington Township, along with those from Oxford Township (for 9–12 only, attending on a tuition basis). Schools in the district (with 2023–24 enrollment data from the National Center for Education Statistics) are Warren Hills Regional Middle School with 480 students in grades 7–8 (located in Washington Borough) and Warren Hills Regional High School with 1,066 students in grades 9–12 (located in Washington Township).

== Awards and recognition ==
For the 2005–06 school year, the district was recognized with the "Best Practices Award" by the New Jersey Department of Education for its "Design Your Dream House" Mathematics program at Mansfield Township Elementary School.

== School ==
Mansfield Elementary School serves students in pre-Kindergarten through sixth grade. The school had an enrollment of 580 students as of the 2023–24 school year.

- Noreen Matias, principal

== Administration ==
Core members of the district's administration are:

- Diana Mai, superintendent
- Kelly Morris, interim business administrator and board secretary

== Board of education ==
The district's board of education, comprised of nine members, sets policy and oversees the fiscal and educational operation of the district through its administration. As a Type II school district, the board's trustees are elected directly by voters to serve three-year terms of office on a staggered basis, with three seats up for election each year held (since 2012) as part of the November general election. The board appoints a superintendent to oversee the district's day-to-day operations and a business administrator to supervise the business functions of the district.
