= Skyland Conference =

High school sports association in New Jersey

The Skyland Conference is a New Jersey high school sports association under the jurisdiction of the New Jersey State Interscholastic Athletic Association (NJSIAA). The conference is made up of 22 public and parochial high schools covering Hunterdon County, Somerset County and Warren County in west central New Jersey.

Hackettstown High School left the conference during the 2009 NJSIAA realignments to join the Northwest Jersey Athletic Conference. North Warren Regional High School opted to leave the Skyland Conference at the end of the 2011–12 school year, also to join the NJAC.

There is no football competition within the Skyland Conference. Instead, member schools which compete in football are part of the Big Central Football Conference.

== Member schools ==
- Belvidere High School
- Bernards High School
- Bound Brook High School
- Bridgewater-Raritan High School
- Delaware Valley Regional High School
- Franklin High School
- Gill St. Bernard's School
- Hillsborough High School
- Hunterdon Central Regional High School
- Immaculata High School
- Manville High School
- Montgomery High School
- Mount St. Mary Academy
- North Hunterdon High School
- Phillipsburg High School
- Ridge High School
- Rutgers Preparatory School
- Pingry School
- Somerville High School
- South Hunterdon Regional High School
- Voorhees High School
- Warren Hills Regional High School
- Warren County Technical School, entering in 2018-2019
- Watchung Hills Regional High School

== Sports ==
- Fall sports: football, field hockey, cheerleading, gymnastics, cross country, soccer, women's tennis, and women's volleyball.
- Winter sports: bowling, fencing, basketball, track & field, ice hockey, swimming, and wrestling.
- Spring sports: golf, fast pitch softball, track & field, baseball, lacrosse, men's tennis, and men's volleyball.
