= Franklin Township School District (Warren County, New Jersey) =

School district in Warren County, New Jersey, US

Address
- 52 Asbury Broadway Road Washington, Warren County, New Jersey, 07882; United States
- Coordinates: 40.725524°N 75.046835°W

District information
- Grades: PreK-6
- Superintendent: Matt Eagleburger
- Business administrator: Tim Duryea
- Schools: 1

Students and staff
- Enrollment: 197 (as of 2022–23)
- Faculty: 25.0 FTEs
- Student–teacher ratio: 7.9:1

Other information
- District Factor Group: DE
- Website: www.franklinschool.org
Ind.	Per pupil	District spending	Rank (*)	K-6 average	%± vs. average
1A	Total Spending	$20,189	48	$18,891	6.9%
1	Budgetary Cost	16,949	52	13,649	24.2%
2	Classroom Instruction	10,395	49	8,366	24.3%
6	Support Services	3,137	53	2,161	45.2%
8	Administrative Cost	1,725	37	1,467	17.6%
10	Operations & Maintenance	1,587	31	1,552	2.3%
13	Extracurricular Activities	85	35	39	117.9%
16	Median Teacher Salary	59,520	35	57,437
Data from NJDoE 2014 Taxpayers' Guide to Education Spending. *Of K-6 districts with any number of students. Lowest spending=1; Highest=59

The Franklin Township School District is a community public school district that serves students in pre-kindergarten through sixth grade from Franklin Township, in Warren County, in the U.S. state of New Jersey.

As of the 2022–23 school year, the district, comprised of one school, had an enrollment of 197 students and 25.0 classroom teachers (on an FTE basis), for a student–teacher ratio of 7.9:1.

The district had been classified by the New Jersey Department of Education as being in District Factor Group "DE", the fifth-highest of eight groupings. District Factor Groups organize districts statewide to allow comparison by common socioeconomic characteristics of the local districts. From lowest socioeconomic status to highest, the categories are A, B, CD, DE, FG, GH, I and J.

Public school students in seventh through twelfth grades attend the schools of the Warren Hills Regional School District, which also serves students from the municipalities of Mansfield Township, Washington Borough, Washington Township and Oxford Township (for 9-12 only, attending on a tuition basis). Schools in the district (with 2022–23 enrollment data from the National Center for Education Statistics) are Warren Hills Regional Middle School with 468 students in grades 7 and 8 (located in Washington Borough) and Warren Hills Regional High School with 1,068 students in grades 9 - 12 (located in Washington Township).

== School ==
The Franklin Township School had an enrollment of 199 students in grades PreK-6 as of the 2022–23 school year.

- Matt Eagleburger, principal

== Administration ==
Core members of the district's administration include:

- Matt Eagleburger, superintendent
- Timothy Duryea, business administrator and board secretary

== Board of education ==
The district's board of education, comprised of nine members, sets policy and oversees the fiscal and educational operation of the district through its administration. As a Type II school district, the board's trustees are elected directly by voters to serve three-year terms of office on a staggered basis, with three seats up for election each year held (since 2012) as part of the November general election. The board appoints a superintendent to oversee the district's day-to-day operations and a business administrator to supervise the business functions of the district.
