= Pohatcong Township School District =

School district in Warren County, New Jersey, US

Address
- 240 Route 519 Pohatcong Township, Warren County, New Jersey, 08865; United States
- Coordinates: 40.651699°N 75.152577°W

District information
- Grades: PreK-8
- Superintendent: Diane Mandry
- Business administrator: Tim Mantz
- Schools: 1

Students and staff
- Enrollment: 309 (as of 2022–23)
- Faculty: 31.0 FTEs
- Student–teacher ratio: 10.0:1

Other information
- District Factor Group: DE
- Website: www.pohatcong.org
Ind.	Per pupil	District spending	Rank (*)	K-8 average	%± vs. average
1A	Total Spending	$17,606	24	$18,891	−6.8%
1	Budgetary Cost	14,118	25	14,159	−0.3%
2	Classroom Instruction	9,033	33	8,659	4.3%
6	Support Services	1,866	19	2,167	−13.9%
8	Administrative Cost	1,487	22	1,547	−3.9%
10	Operations & Maintenance	1,698	30	1,612	5.3%
13	Extracurricular Activities	33	11	104	−68.3%
16	Median Teacher Salary	57,635	34	61,136
Data from NJDoE 2014 Taxpayers' Guide to Education Spending. *Of K-8 districts with up to 400 students. Lowest spending=1; Highest=71

The Pohatcong Township School District is a comprehensive community public school district that serves students in pre-kindergarten through eighth grade from Pohatcong Township, in Warren County, in the U.S. state of New Jersey.

As of the 2022–23 school year, the district, comprised of one school, had an enrollment of 309 students and 31.0 classroom teachers (on an FTE basis), for a student–teacher ratio of 10.0:1.

The district is classified by the New Jersey Department of Education as being in District Factor Group "DE", the fifth-highest of eight groupings by common socioeconomic characteristics.

Public school students in ninth through twelfth grades attend Phillipsburg High School in Phillipsburg, which serves students from the Town of Phillipsburg as part of a sending/receiving relationship with the Phillipsburg School District. The high school also serves students from four other sending communities: Alpha, Bloomsbury (in Hunterdon County), Greenwich Township and Lopatcong Township. As of the 2018–19 school year, the high school had an enrollment of 1,650 students and 126.5 classroom teachers (on an FTE basis), for a student–teacher ratio of 13.0:1.

== Schools ==
Schools in the district (with 2018–19 enrollment data from the National Center for Education Statistics) are:

- Pohatcong Township Elementary School for Pre-K to grade 8 (302 students)
  - Keith Kullman, principal

== Administration ==
Core members of the districts' administration are:

- Diane Mandry, superintendent
- Tim Mantz, business administrator and board secretary

== Board of education ==
The district's board of education, comprised of nine members, sets policy and oversees the fiscal and educational operation of the district through its administration. As a Type II school district, the board's trustees are elected directly by voters to serve three-year terms of office on a staggered basis, with three seats up for election each year held (since 2012) as part of the November general election. The board appoints a superintendent to oversee the district's day-to-day operations and a business administrator to supervise the business functions of the district.
