= Alpha School District =

School district in Warren County, New Jersey, US

Address
- 817 North Boulevard Alpha, Warren County, 08865; United States
- Coordinates: 40.664144°N 75.164305°W

District information
- Grades: PreK-8
- Superintendent: Seth Cohen
- Business administrator: Timothy Mantz
- Schools: 1

Students and staff
- Enrollment: 204 (as of 2023–24)
- Faculty: 19.5 FTEs
- Student–teacher ratio: 10.5:1

Other information
- District Factor Group: B
- Website: www.apsedu.org
Ind.	Per pupil	District spending	Rank (*)	K-8 average	%± vs. average
1A	Total Spending	$15,479	4	$18,891	−18.1%
1	Budgetary Cost	14,532	29	14,159	2.6%
2	Classroom Instruction	9,554	44	8,659	10.3%
6	Support Services	2,188	25	2,167	1.0%
8	Administrative Cost	1,544	26	1,547	−0.2%
10	Operations & Maintenance	1,211	8	1,612	−24.9%
13	Extracurricular Activities	36	12	104	−65.4%
16	Median Teacher Salary	53,422	15	61,136
Data from NJDoE 2014 Taxpayers' Guide to Education Spending. *Of K-8 districts with up to 400 students. Lowest spending=1; Highest=71

The Alpha School District is a comprehensive community public school district that serves students in pre-kindergarten through eighth grade from Alpha, in Warren County, in the U.S. state of New Jersey.

As of the 2023–24 school year, the district, comprised of one school, had an enrollment of 204 students and 19.5 classroom teachers (on an FTE basis), for a student–teacher ratio of 10.5:1. In the 2016–17 school year, Alpha had the 42nd smallest enrollment of any school district in the state, with 194 students.

The district had been classified by the New Jersey Department of Education as being in District Factor Group "B", the second lowest of eight groupings. District Factor Groups organize districts statewide to allow comparison by common socioeconomic characteristics of the local districts. From lowest socioeconomic status to highest, the categories are A, B, CD, DE, FG, GH, I and J.

Public school students in ninth through twelfth grades attend Phillipsburg High School in Phillipsburg, which serves students from Alpha as part of a sending/receiving relationship with the Phillipsburg School District. The high school also serves students from four other sending communities: Bloomsbury (in Hunterdon County), Greenwich Township, Lopatcong Township and Pohatcong Township. As of the 2023–24 school year, the high school had an enrollment of 1,799 students and 139.5 classroom teachers (on an FTE basis), for a student–teacher ratio of 12.9:1.

== Schools ==
Schools in the district (with 2023–24 enrollment data from the National Center for Education Statistics) are:

- Alpha School for PreK to grade 8 (198 students)

== Administration ==
Core members of the districts' administration are:

- Seth Cohen, superintendent
- Timothy Mantz, business administrator / board secretary

== Board of education ==
The district's board of education, comprised of nine members, sets policy and oversees the fiscal and educational operation of the district through its administration. As a Type II school district, the board's trustees are elected directly by voters to serve three-year terms of office on a staggered basis, with three seats up for election each year held (since 2012) as part of the November general election. The board appoints a superintendent to oversee the district's day-to-day operations and a business administrator to supervise the business functions of the district.
