= Lopatcong Township School District =

School district in Warren County, New Jersey, US

Address
- 321 Stonehenge Drive Lopatcong Township, Warren County, New Jersey, 08865; United States
- Coordinates: 40.701098°N 75.148493°W

District information
- Grades: PreK-8
- Superintendent: Israel Marmolejos
- Business administrator: Tina Palecek
- Schools: 2

Students and staff
- Enrollment: 707 (as of 2021–22)
- Faculty: 58.0 FTEs
- Student–teacher ratio: 12.2:1

Other information
- District Factor Group: DE
- Website: www.lopatcongschool.org
| Ind. | Per pupil | District spending | Rank (*) | K-8 average | %± vs. average |
|---|---|---|---|---|---|
| 1A | Total Spending | $14,340 | 7 | $18,891 | −24.1% |
| 1 | Budgetary Cost | 11,919 | 15 | 14,159 | −15.8% |
| 2 | Classroom Instruction | 7,736 | 21 | 8,659 | −10.7% |
| 6 | Support Services | 1,285 | 4 | 2,167 | −40.7% |
| 8 | Administrative Cost | 1,323 | 17 | 1,547 | −14.5% |
| 10 | Operations & Maintenance | 1,515 | 42 | 1,612 | −6.0% |
| 13 | Extracurricular Activities | 52 | 11 | 104 | −50.0% |
| 16 | Median Teacher Salary | 63,940 | 60 | 61,136 |
Data from NJDoE 2014 Taxpayers' Guide to Education Spending. *Of K-8 districts with more than 750 students. Lowest spending=1; Highest=84

The Lopatcong Township School District is a comprehensive community public school district that serves students in pre-kindergarten through eighth grade from Lopatcong Township, in Warren County, in the U.S. state of New Jersey.

As of the 2021–22 school year, the district, comprising two schools, had an enrollment of 707 students and 58.0 classroom teachers (on an FTE basis), for a student–teacher ratio of 12.2:1.

The district is classified by the New Jersey Department of Education as being in District Factor Group "DE", the fifth-highest of eight groupings. District Factor Groups organize districts statewide to allow comparison by common socioeconomic characteristics of the local districts. From lowest socioeconomic status to highest, the categories are A, B, CD, DE, FG, GH, I and J.

Public school students in ninth through twelfth grades attend Phillipsburg High School in Phillipsburg as part of a sending/receiving relationship with the Phillipsburg School District. The high school also serves students from four other sending communities: Alpha, Bloomsbury (in Hunterdon County), Greenwich Township and Pohatcong Township. The site of the new Phillipsburg High School, which began construction in January 2014, is in Lopatcong's borders. The three-story, 330,000-square-foot (31,000 m^{2}) building, with more than double the floor space of the existing high school and a capacity to accommodate more than 2,100 students, was completed for the 2016–17 school year and was dedicated in September 2016 at ceremonies attended by Governor of New Jersey Chris Christie. As of the 2021–22 school year, the high school had an enrollment of 1,809 students and 133.5 classroom teachers (on an FTE basis), for a student–teacher ratio of 13.6:1.

== Schools ==
Schools in the district (with 2021–22 enrollment data from the National Center for Education Statistics) are:

Elementary school

- Lopatcong Township Elementary School with 350 students in grades PreK-4
  - Krista Wayne, principal

Middle school

- Lopatcong Township Middle School with 355 students in grades 5-8
  - Richard Bonney, principal

Before the Middle School opened in 2003, students would attend the Elementary School through eighth grade.

== Administration ==
Core members of the district's administration are:

- Israel Marmolejos, superintendent
- Tina Palecek, business administrator

== Board of education ==
The district's board of education, comprised of nine members, sets policy and oversees the fiscal and educational operation of the district through its administration. As a Type II school district, the board's trustees are elected directly by voters to serve three-year terms of office on a staggered basis, with three seats up for election each year held (since 2012) as part of the November general election. The board appoints a superintendent to oversee the district's day-to-day operations and a business administrator to supervise the business functions of the district.
