= Dan Gray (American football) =

American football player (born 1956)

No. 64
- Position: Defensive tackle

Personal information
- Born: January 29, 1956 (age 70); Phillipsburg, New Jersey, U.S.
- Listed height: 6 ft 6 in (1.98 m)
- Listed weight: 240 lb (109 kg)

Career information
- High school: Belvidere
- College: Rutgers
- NFL draft: 1978: 5th round, 123rd overall pick

Career history
- Detroit Lions (1978–1979)

Awards and highlights
- Second-team All-East (1977)

Career NFL statistics
- Fumble recoveries: 1
- Stats at Pro Football Reference

Daniel Thomas Gray (born January 29, 1956) is an American former professional football player who was a defensive tackle for the Detroit Lions of the National Football League (NFL) in 1978. He played college football for the Rutgers Scarlet Knights.

Born in Phillipsburg, New Jersey, and raised in nearby Belvidere, New Jersey, Gray played prep football at Belvidere High School.
