= Hackettstown School District =

School district in Warren County, New Jersey, US

Coordinates: 40.85218°N 74.829343°W

Address
- 315 Washington Avenue Hackettstown, Warren County, New Jersey, 07840; United States

District information
- Grades: PreK-12
- Superintendent: Debra Grigoletti
- Business administrator: Tim Havlusch
- Schools: 4

Students and staff
- Enrollment: 2,003 (as of 2021–22)
- Faculty: 172.5 FTEs
- Student–teacher ratio: 11.6:1

Other information
- District Factor Group: DE
- Website: www.hackettstown.org
| Ind. | Per pupil | District spending | Rank (*) | K-12 average | %± vs. average |
|---|---|---|---|---|---|
| 1A | Total Spending | $17,551 | 28 | $18,891 | −7.1% |
| 1 | Budgetary Cost | 14,466 | 46 | 14,783 | −2.1% |
| 2 | Classroom Instruction | 8,258 | 38 | 8,763 | −5.8% |
| 6 | Support Services | 2,414 | 53 | 2,392 | 0.9% |
| 8 | Administrative Cost | 1,575 | 43 | 1,485 | 6.1% |
| 10 | Operations & Maintenance | 1,600 | 34 | 1,783 | −10.3% |
| 13 | Extracurricular Activities | 620 | 65 | 268 | 131.3% |
| 16 | Median Teacher Salary | 68,175 | 51 | 64,043 |
Data from NJDoE 2014 Taxpayers' Guide to Education Spending. *Of K-12 districts with 1,800-3,500 students. Lowest spending=1; Highest=68

The Hackettstown School District is a comprehensive community public school district that serves students in pre-kindergarten through twelfth grade from Hackettstown, in Warren County, in the U.S. state of New Jersey. The district serves students in four schools: two elementary schools (covering K-4), a middle school (5-8), and a four-year high school (9-12).

As of the 2021–22 school year, the district, comprised of four schools, had an enrollment of 2,003 students and 172.5 classroom teachers (on an FTE basis), for a student–teacher ratio of 11.6:1.

The district is classified by the New Jersey Department of Education as being in District Factor Group "DE", the fifth-highest of eight groupings. District Factor Groups organize districts statewide to allow comparison by common socioeconomic characteristics of the local districts. From lowest socioeconomic status to highest, the categories are A, B, CD, DE, FG, GH, I and J.

The high school serves students Hackettstown, as well as those from the townships of Allamuchy, Independence, and Liberty, as part of sending/receiving relationships.

== Awards and recognition ==
For the 2001-02 school year, Hackettstown Middle School was recognized with the National Blue Ribbon Award of Excellence from the United States Department of Education, the highest honor that an American school can achieve.

== Schools ==
Schools in the district (with 2021–22 enrollment data from the National Center for Education Statistics) are:

Elementary schools

- Hatchery Hill School with 275 students in grades PreK-1
  - Marie Griffin, principal
- Willow Grove School with 368 students in grades 2-4
  - Tanya Kurilla, principal

Middle school

- Hackettstown Middle School with 475 students in grades 5-8
  - Jessica Swaim, principal

High school

- Hackettstown High School with 869 students in grades 9-12
  - Kyle Sosnovik, principal

== Administration ==
Core members of the district's administration are:

- Debra Grigoletti, superintendent of schools
- Tim Havlusch, business administrator and board secretary

== Board of education ==
The district's board of education, comprised of eleven members, sets policy and oversees the fiscal and educational operation of the district through its administration. As a Type II school district, the board's trustees are elected directly by voters to serve three-year terms of office on a staggered basis, with either three or four seats up for election each year held (since 2012) as part of the November general election. The board appoints a superintendent to oversee the district's day-to-day operations and a business administrator to supervise the business functions of the district.
