= Warren County, New Jersey =

County in northwestern New Jersey, United States

- County
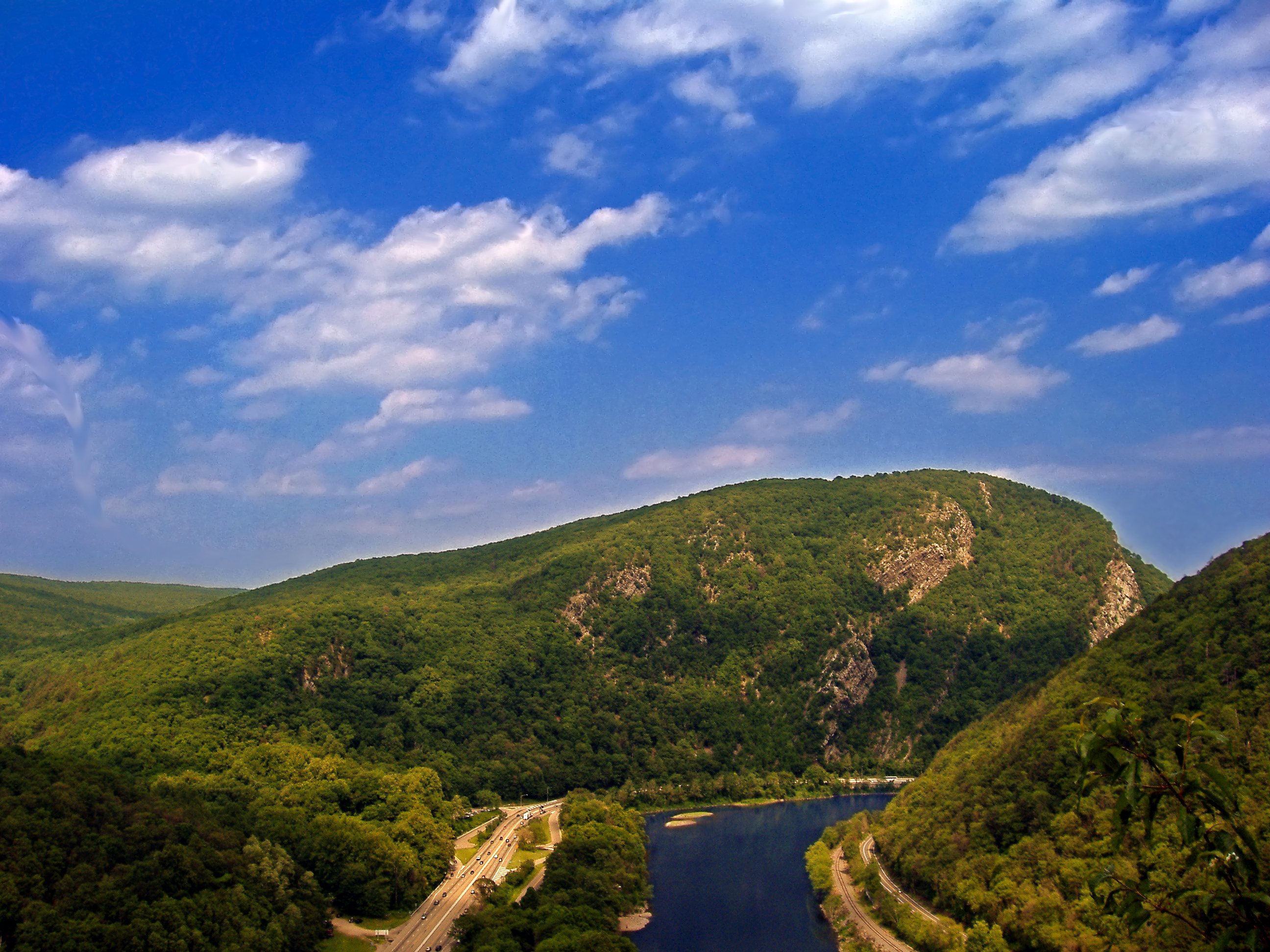
- Delaware Water Gap (center) between Warren County (right) and neighboring Monroe County, Pennsylvania (left) in May 2008

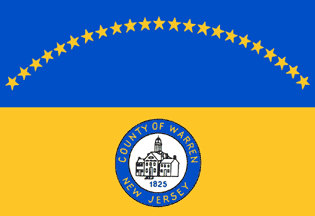
- Flag Seal

- Location within the U.S. state of New Jersey
- Interactive map of Warren County, New Jersey
- Coordinates: 40.9°N 75.0°W
- Country: United States
- State: New Jersey
- Founded: November 20, 1824
- Named for: Joseph Warren
- Seat: Belvidere
- Largest municipality: Phillipsburg (population); Hardwick Township (area)

Government
  - Commissioner director: Lori Ciesla (R, term ends December 31, 2024)

Area
  - Total: 362.65 sq mi (939.3 km^{2})
  - Land: 356.54 sq mi (923.4 km^{2})
  - Water: 6.11 sq mi (15.8 km^{2}) 1.7%

Population (2020)
  - Total: 109,632
  - Estimate (2025): 112,953 ▲
  - Density: 307.49/sq mi (118.72/km^{2})
- Time zone: UTC−5 (Eastern)
  - Summer (DST): UTC−4 (EDT)
- Congressional district: 7th
- Website: warrencountynj.gov

Warren County is a county located in the northwestern part of the U.S. state of New Jersey. According to the 2020 census, the county was the state's 19th-most populous county, with a population of 109,632, its highest decennial count ever and an increase of 940 (+0.9%) from the 2010 census count of 108,692, which in turn reflected an increase of 6,255 (+6.1%) from 102,437 counted at the 2000 census. The United States Census Bureau's Population Estimates Program estimated a 2025 population of 112,953, an increase of 3,321 (+3.0%) from the 2020 decennial census. The county is part of the North Jersey region of the state.

The county borders the Delaware River and Easton, Pennsylvania in the Lehigh Valley to its west, the New York City metropolitan area to its east, the Poconos to its northwest, and Hunterdon County to its south.

Warren County constitutes part of the Allentown-Bethlehem-Easton, PA-NJ metropolitan statistical area in the Lehigh Valley and is the only New Jersey county not a part of the combined statistical areas of either New York City or Philadelphia. The county's most populous municipality is Phillipsburg, with 15,249 residents at the time of the 2020 census while Hardwick Township had both the largest area, 37.92 square miles (98.2 km^{2}), and the fewest people with 1,696 residents. Its county seat is Belvidere.

Warren County was incorporated by an act of the New Jersey Legislature on November 20, 1824, from portions of Sussex County. At its establishment, the county consisted of the townships of Greenwich, Independence, Knowlton, Mansfield, Oxford, and the now defunct Pahaquarry.

Warren County is named for Joseph Warren, a patriot during the American Revolution and Founding Father of the United States who was killed in action by British troops at the Battle of Bunker Hill, in Charlestown, Massachusetts on June 17, 1775.

== History ==
=== Etymology ===
The county was named for Major General Joseph Warren, a reputable physician treating prominent patients like John Adams, known Founding Father of the United States, and major general in the American Revolutionary War who died after volunteering to fight as a major general at the Battle of Bunker Hill.

=== Native Americans ===
About 1000 B.C., clay pottery was beginning to be used in the region, representing the beginning of the Woodland period. With this advancement in technology, Native Americans could store food and cook it better.

Various cultures of indigenous peoples occupied the area at that time. Ancestors of the Algonquian-speaking Lenape moved into the area, perhaps as early as 1000 A.D. from the Mississippi River area.

Technological innovations occurred around the year 500 A.D. with the invention of the bow and arrow as projectile points became smaller to fit onto an arrow shaft. This permitted Native Americans to procure more food since they could be further away from game to kill it. Food such as nuts could be stored in clay pots or the pots were used for cooking

Agriculture started around that time with the cultivation of corn, beans, and squash. Seeds were probably procured from traveling groups or tribes. Settlements of family groups became more stable, as they could store food in pottery, as well as procure more game with the bow and arrow. Agriculture contributed to the rise of population density in areas where crops could be grown. The Lenape would tend their oval gardens during the spring and summer months. They fished with nets or by hand in the shallow rivers. The Lenape trapped game with deadfalls and snares.

=== 17th century ===
Problems developed in the early 17th century when the Little Ice Age began in North America. The late frost in May and June and early frosts in August or September, made the growing of crops difficult. Cold weather also made big and small game more difficult to hurt, as some game animals would hibernate. Also nut crops from oak, hickory, beech, walnut, butternut, and chestnut, failed at times; making the supply of these nuts scarce. Rivers froze early, and water became cold fast; so fishing became impossible. The Native populations had declined after epidemics of infectious diseases, for which they had no acquired immunity.

Native American populations were separated from Europe for thousands of years and had no immunity to these diseases that the Europeans brought with them. Many Native American populations were weakened from starvation due to the Little Ice Age, which was coldest during the 17th century. Their important corn, bean and squash crops failed due to spring frosts and early frosts in autumn. As the Native American population declined, more land was available for European settlement. All these factors made the Native American populations decline dramatically.

Europeans purchased land known as land patents so Native Americans moved west to Ohio or Canada. The Dutch settled the Hudson River Valley and claimed all lands west of the Hudson River in the early 17th century. In the Quintipartite Deed of 1674 to 1702, the Province of New Jersey was divided by two lines, the Keith Line and the Coxe-Barclay line, which created the border of eastern Sussex county from the headwaters of the Pequannock River. The western border was the Delaware River.

Later, after the lands were taken over by the British, colonial-era New Jersey was divided into two parts, East Jersey and West Jersey. In the 17th century, the area of present-day Warren County was part of Burlington County, which emerged as one of the Thirteen Colonies in British America prior to the mid-18th century American Revolution.

=== 18th century ===
The area became Hunterdon County in 1714. In 1739, the area of Warren County was included in Morris County. In 1753, Sussex County, including present-day Warren County, separated from Morris County.

During the French and Indian War of 1754, fortified homes or small forts were built along the Delaware River from Phillipsburg to Port Jervis, New York. The mountains of Warren County were the frontier of the war. Hostilities between the British and the French began to spill over from the European continent into the colonies in the New World. After the Battle of Jumonville Glen in Fayette County, Pennsylvania on May 28, 1754, French colonists in North America armed several Native American tribes, who sided with the French.

During the French and Indian War, a part of the Seven Years' War in North America, Sussex County often was raided by bands of Native Americans, including Lenape, Shawnee, and Iroquois. In 1756, a small band of Lenape raided the homes of local militia commanders, killing several members of the Swartout family and kidnapping other settlers during the Hunt-Swartout raid. In response to these aggressions, Jonathan Belcher, the colonial-era governor of the Province of New Jersey authorized that eight forts to be constructed along the Delaware River to defend the New Jersey frontier from such incursions, and authorized the New Jersey Frontier Guard to man them. Several of these forts were little more than blockhouses, and others were personal homes that were fortified. The forts sprawled from present-day Phillipsburg through Belvidere. Blairstown, and along the eastern banks of the Delaware River to Port Jervis, New York.

=== 19th century ===
By the early 1800s, settlements in Phillipsburg, Hackettstown, Belvidere, and Washington in Warren County emerged as cornerstone communities of Sussex County. In 1824, Warren County was established and Belvidere was named as its county seat.

== Geography and climate ==
According to the U.S. Census Bureau, as of the 2020 census, the county had a total area of 362.65 square miles (939.3 km^{2}), of which 356.54 square miles (923.4 km^{2}) was land (98.3%) and 6.11 square miles (15.8 km^{2}) was water (1.7%). Warren County has rolling hills with the Kittatinny Ridge in the west. Allamuchy Mountain and Jenny Jump Mountain are part of the New York – New Jersey Highlands, also known as the Reading Prong. Around 450 million years ago, a chain of volcanic islands collided with proto North America. The chain of islands went over the North American Plate, creating the Highlands from the island rock and establishing the Great Appalachian Valley. The final collision was when the African Plate collided with the North American plate. That was the final episode of the building of the Appalachian Mountains. Then the African plate tore away from North America.

The Wisconsin Glacier covered the northern part of the county from 21,000 to 13,000 BC. The glacier covered the top of Kittatinny Mountain and carved the terrain in the northern part of the county. The terminal moraine runs from north of Belvidere to the south of Great Meadows to north of Hackettstown, to the north of Budd Lake. Blairstown Township, Hope Township, half of Independence Township, part of White Township, and all of Allamuchy Township was covered by the Glacier. When the glacier melted, a lake was formed at Great Meadows. Slowly the lake drained leaving a large flat area filled with organic material.

The county is drained by three rivers. All three rivers are shallow and narrow. They are fresh water rivers that are excellent for fishing. The Paulins Kill drains the western portion of the county. The river flows from Newton to Blairstown Township, and then through Knowlton Township where it drains into the Delaware River. The Pequest River drains the middle of the county flowing from Andover Township through Allamuchy, then to Independence Township where it turns west and flows through White Township and then empties into the Delaware River at Belvidere. The third river is the Musconetcong. Starting at Lake Musconetcong, the river divides the county from Morris and Hunterdon. This river drains the southern portion of the county and empties into the Delaware River near Warren Glen.

Warren County is located in two valleys of the Great Appalachian Valley. The first is the Kittatinny Valley, which is in the northern part of the county, and the Lehigh Valley, which borders the southern part of the county.

The Lehigh Valley starts at the terminal moraine of the Wisconsin Glacier slightly north of Belvidere. It extends from the Delaware River south to where the Musconetcong River enters the Delaware River, northeast to the Jenny Jump Mountains and then along Route 80 to the Allamuchy Mountains to the terminal moraine near Hackettstown. The Kittatinny Valley is situated north of the terminal moraine; it runs north of Belvidere, to south of Great Meadows, then east to the north of Hackettstown. Towns such as Blairstown, Johnsonburg, Hope and Allamuchy are in the Kittatinny Valley

The highest elevation is 1,600 feet (490 m) above sea level on the Kittatinny Ridge, at two areas just south of Upper Yards Creek Reservoir, west of Blairstown. The lowest point is the confluence of the Delaware and Musconetcong rivers at the county's southern tip, at 160 feet (49 m) of elevation. The highest elevation on Allamuchy Mountain is 1,240 feet (380 m) on the ridge northeast of Allamuchy. On Jenny Jump Mountain the highest point is 1,134 feet (346 m) east of the Shiloh area or south of Interstate 80. Sunfish Pond has an elevation of 1,379 feet (420 m) and upper Yards Creek Reservoir is at 1,555 feet (474 m).

=== Locations ===
- Allamuchy
- Asbury (Hunterdon)
- Belvidere
- Blairstown
- Bloomsbury (Hunterdon)
- Broadway
- Buttzville
- Changewater
- Columbia
- Delaware
- Great Meadows
- Hackettstown
- Hampton (Hunterdon)
- Hope
- Johnsonburg
- Oxford
- Port Murray
- Phillipsburg
- Stewartsville
- Vienna
- Washington

=== Climate and weather ===
Warren County has a humid continental climate (Dfa/Dfb). Average monthly temperatures in downtown Phillipsburg range from 29.0 °F (−1.7 °C) in January to 74.2 °F (23.4 °C) in July, while in Hackettstown they range from 27.0 °F (−2.8 °C) in January to 71.5 °F (21.9 °C) in July. The hardiness zones are 6a and 6b.

Belvidere, New Jersey

Climate chart (precipitation, max. and min. temperature)
J	F	M	A	M	J	J	A	S	O	N	D
3.1 37 19	2.8 41 21	3.6 50 28	4 61 37	4.1 72 47	4.3 80 57	4.7 85 62	3.9 83 60	4.3 76 52	4.5 65 41	3.6 54 32	3.6 42 24
- █ Average max. and min. temperatures in °F
- █ Precipitation totals in inches
- Source: The Weather Channel
Metric conversion
J	F	M	A	M	J	J	A	S	O	N	D
78 3 −7	70 5 −6	91 10 −2	100 16 3	105 22 8	109 27 14	118 29 17	99 28 16	110 24 11	115 18 5	91 12 0	92 6 −4
- █ Average max. and min. temperatures in °C
- █ Precipitation totals in mm

Average temperatures in the county seat of Belvidere have ranged from a low of 19 °F (−7 °C) in January to a high of 85 °F (29 °C) in July, although a record low of −17 °F (−27 °C) was recorded in January 1994 and a record high of 101 °F (38 °C) was recorded in July 1999. Average monthly precipitation ranged from 2.77 inches (70 mm) in February to 4.65 inches (118 mm) in July.

== Demographics ==
Historical population
Census	Pop.	Note	%±
1830	18,627		—
1840	20,366		9.3%
1850	22,358		9.8%
1860	28,433		27.2%
1870	34,336		20.8%
1880	36,589		6.6%
1890	36,553		−0.1%
1900	37,781		3.4%
1910	43,187		14.3%
1920	45,057		4.3%
1930	49,319		9.5%
1940	50,181		1.7%
1950	54,374		8.4%
1960	63,220		16.3%
1970	73,960		17.0%
1980	84,429		14.2%
1990	91,607		8.5%
2000	102,437		11.8%
2010	108,692		6.1%
2020	109,632		0.9%
2025 (est.)	112,953		3.0%
Historical sources: 1790–1990; 1970–2010 2000; 2010 2000–2010 2010-2020

The county is part of the Allentown-Bethlehem-Easton, PA-NJ metropolitan statistical area in the Lehigh Valley.

=== 2020 census ===
As of the 2020 census, the county had a population of 109,632. The median age was 44.4 years. 19.9% of residents were under the age of 18 and 18.8% of residents were 65 years of age or older. For every 100 females there were 94.9 males, and for every 100 females age 18 and over there were 93.0 males age 18 and over.

The racial makeup of the county was 79.2% White, 5.4% Black or African American, 0.2% American Indian and Alaska Native, 2.7% Asian, <0.1% Native Hawaiian and Pacific Islander, 4.2% from some other race, and 8.3% from two or more races. Hispanic or Latino residents of any race comprised 11.2% of the population.

56.8% of residents lived in urban areas, while 43.2% lived in rural areas.

There were 43,327 households in the county, of which 28.3% had children under the age of 18 living in them. Of all households, 50.9% were married-couple households, 17.0% were households with a male householder and no spouse or partner present, and 25.3% were households with a female householder and no spouse or partner present. About 27.1% of all households were made up of individuals and 12.1% had someone living alone who was 65 years of age or older.

=== Racial and ethnic composition ===
Warren County, New Jersey – Racial and ethnic composition Note: the US Census treats Hispanic/Latino as an ethnic category. This table excludes Latinos from the racial categories and assigns them to a separate category. Hispanics/Latinos may be of any race.
Race / Ethnicity (NH = Non-Hispanic)	Pop 1980	Pop 1990	Pop 2000	Pop 2010	Pop 2020	% 1980	% 1990	% 2000	% 2010	% 2020
White alone (NH)	82,024	87,697	94,405	93,165	84,255	97.15%	95.73%	92.16%	85.71%	76.85%
Black or African American alone (NH)	909	1,240	1,838	3,592	5,573	1.08%	1.35%	1.79%	3.30%	5.08%
Native American or Alaska Native alone (NH)	59	112	98	107	96	0.07%	0.12%	0.10%	0.10%	0.09%
Asian alone (NH)	369	738	1,235	2,642	2,886	0.44%	0.81%	1.21%	2.43%	2.63%
Native Hawaiian or Pacific Islander alone (NH)	x	x	15	19	28	x	x	0.01%	0.02%	0.03%
Other race alone (NH)	107	36	110	140	500	0.13%	0.04%	0.11%	0.13%	0.46%
Mixed race or Multiracial (NH)	x	x	985	1,368	4,069	x	x	0.96%	1.26%	3.71%
Hispanic or Latino (any race)	961	1,784	3,751	7,659	12,225	1.14%	1.95%	3.66%	7.05%	11.15%
Total	84,429	91,607	102,437	108,692	109,632	100.00%	100.00%	100.00%	100.00%	100.00%

=== 2010 census ===
The 2010 United States census counted 108,692 people, 41,480 households, and 28,870 families in the county. The population density was 304.5 inhabitants per square mile (117.6/km^{2}). There were 44,925 housing units at an average density of 125.9 per square mile (48.6/km^{2}). The racial makeup was 90.29% (98,137) White, 3.51% (3,818) Black or African American, 0.14% (155) Native American, 2.46% (2,673) Asian, 0.03% (30) Pacific Islander, 1.81% (1,964) from other races, and 1.76% (1,915) from two or more races. Hispanic or Latino people of any race were 7.05% (7,659) of the population.

Of the 41,480 households, 31.2% had children under the age of 18; 55.1% were married couples living together; 10.2% had a female householder with no husband present and 30.4% were non-families. Of all households, 25% were made up of individuals and 10.1% had someone living alone who was 65 years of age or older. The average household size was 2.57 and the average family size was 3.1.

23.6% of the population were under the age of 18, 7.9% from 18 to 24, 24.1% from 25 to 44, 30.4% from 45 to 64, and 14.1% who were 65 years of age or older. The median age was 41.5 years. For every 100 females, the population had 94.6 males. For every 100 females ages 18 and older there were 91.5 males.

=== 2000 census ===
As of the 2000 United States census there were 102,437 people, 38,660 households, and 27,487 families residing in the county. The population density was 286 inhabitants per square mile (110/km^{2}). There were 41,157 housing units at an average density of 115 per square mile (44/km^{2}). The racial makeup of the county was 94.54% White, 1.87% Black or African American, 0.11% Native American, 1.21% Asian, 0.02% Pacific Islander, 1.01% from other races, and 1.24% from two or more races. 3.66% of the population were Hispanic or Latino of any race. Among those residents listing their ancestry, 24.1% were of German, 19.7% Irish, 18.7% Italian, 9.8% English, 8.9% Polish and 4.4% American ancestry according to Census 2000.

There were 38,660 households out of which 34.70% had children under the age of 18 living with them, 58.20% were married couples living together, 9.20% had a female householder with no husband present, and 28.90% were non-families. 24.00% of all households were made up of individuals and 10.00% had someone living alone who was 65 years of age or older. The average household size was 2.61 and the average family size was 3.12.

In the county, the population was spread out with 26.10% under the age of 18, 6.30% from 18 to 24, 31.30% from 25 to 44, 23.50% from 45 to 64, and 12.90% who were 65 years of age or older. The median age was 38 years. For every 100 females there were 94.90 males. For every 100 females age 18 and over, there were 91.10 males.

The median income for a household in the county was $56,100, and the median income for a family was $66,223. Males had a median income of $47,331 versus $31,790 for females. The per capita income for the county was $25,728. About 3.6% of families and 5.4% of the population were below the poverty line, including 5.9% of those under age 18 and 6.7% of those age 65 or over.

== Economy ==
The Bureau of Economic Analysis calculated that the county's gross domestic product was $3.7 billion in 2021, which was ranked smallest of the state's 21 counties and was a 3.6% increase from the prior year.

=== Viticulture ===
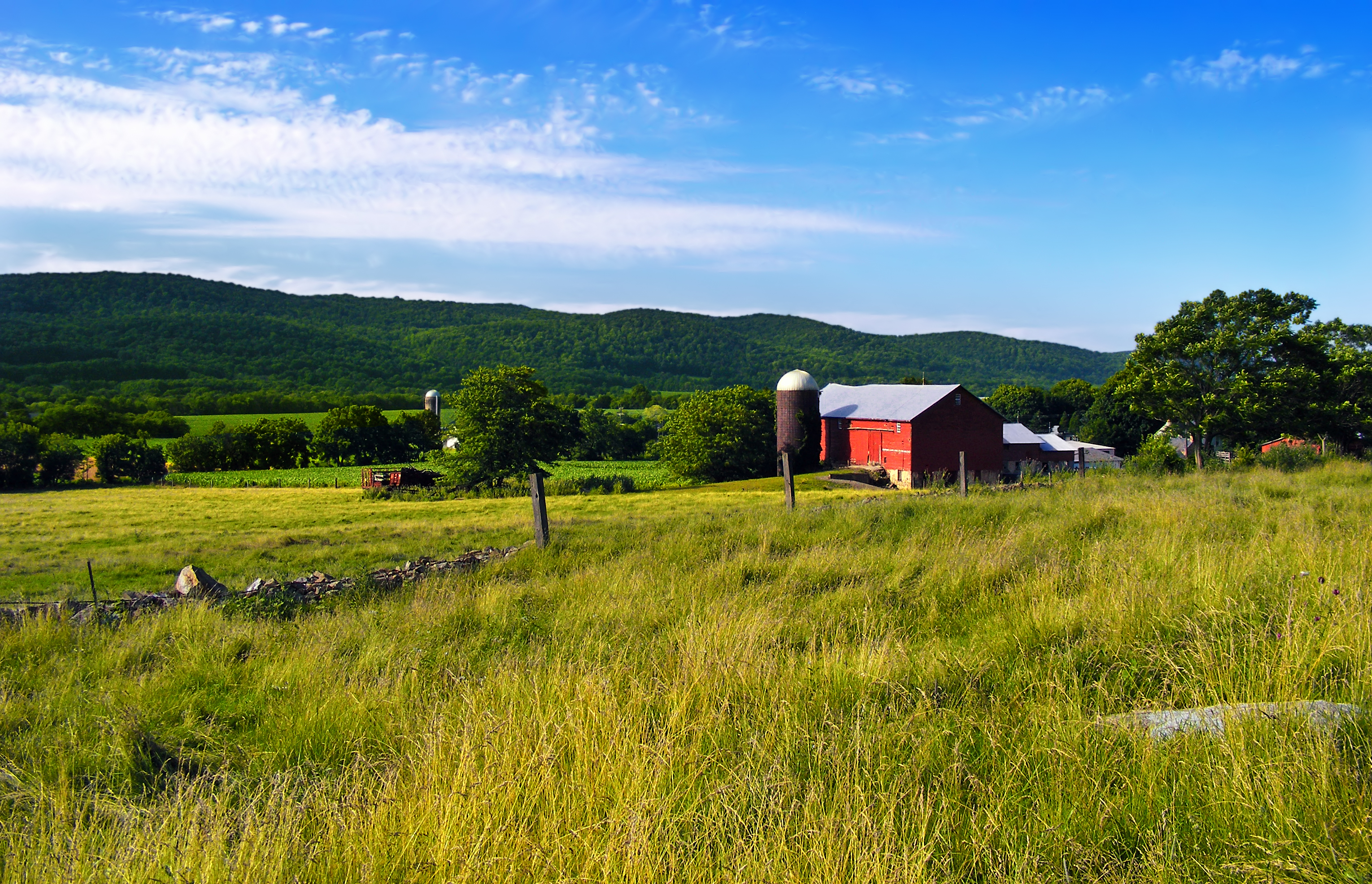
A farm in Franklin Township in Warren County in July 2009

Most of Warren County is designated in the Warren Hills American Viticultural Area (AVA) including five active county wineries:

- Alba Vineyard
- Brook Hollow Winery
- Four Sisters Winery
- Vacchiano Farm
- Villa Milagro Vineyards

== Municipalities ==
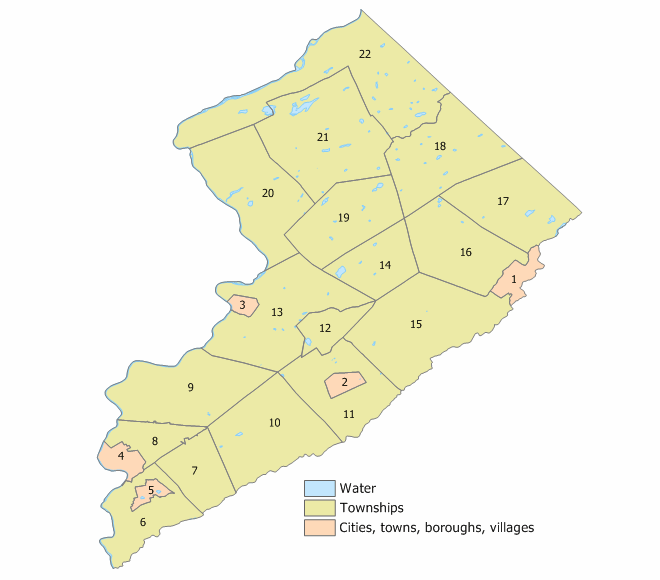
A map of Warren County municipalities (click to see an index key)

Interactive map of municipalities in Warren County

The 22 municipalities in Warren County, with Census-designated places (CDPs) and other communities listed, are:

Municipality (with map key)	Map key	Mun. type	Pop.	Housing units	Total area	Water area	Land Area	Pop. density	Housing density	School district	Communities
Allamuchy; Township	17	township	5,335	2,096	20.76	0.31	20.45	211.3	102.5	Hackettstown (9–12) (S/R); Allamuchy (PK-8)	Allamuchy CDP (156); Panther Valley CDP (4,391)
Alpha	5	borough	2,328	1,032	1.70	0.03	1.67	1,417.2	617.4	Phillipsburg (9–12) (S/R); Alpha (PK-8)	
Belvidere	3	town	2,520	1,140	1.49	0.04	1.45	1,847.0	785.4	Belvidere	
Blairstown; Township	21	township	5,704	2,272	31.70	0.89	30.82	193.6	73.7	North Warren (7–12); Blairstown (K-6)	Blairstown CDP (493); Hainesburg CDP (part; 422); Paulina
Franklin; Township	10	township	2,968	1,219	24.13	0.09	24.04	132.1	50.7	Warren Hills (7–12); Franklin Township (PK-6)	Asbury CDP (270); Broadway CDP (213); New Village CDP (399)
Frelinghuysen; Township	18	township	2,199	826	23.57	0.24	23.32	95.6	35.4	North Warren (7–12); Frelinghuysen (PK-6)	Johnsonburg CDP (381); Marksboro CDP (186)
Greenwich; Township	7	township	5,473	1,870	10.54	0.01	10.53	542.5	177.6	Phillipsburg (9–12) (S/R); Greenwich (PK-8)	Greenwich CDP (2,558); Stewartsville CDP (636); Upper Stewartsville CDP (329)
Hackettstown	1	town	10,248	3,755	3.71	0.10	3.61	2,696.1	1,041.1	Hackettstown	
Hardwick; Township	22	township	1,598	619	37.92	1.32	36.60	46.3	16.9	North Warren (7–12); Blairstown (K-6)	
Harmony; Township	9	township	2,503	1,109	24.08	0.38	23.70	112.5	46.8	Belvidere (9–12) (S/R); Harmony (PK-8)	Brainards CDP (194); Harmony CDP (374); Hutchinson CDP (103)
Hope; Township	19	township	1,835	809	18.84	0.22	18.62	104.8	43.4	Belvidere (9–12) (S/R); Hope Township (PK-8)	Hope CDP (256); Mount Hermon CDP (172); Silver Lake CDP (368)
Independence; Township	16	township	5,469	2,325	19.89	0.15	19.74	286.8	117.8	Hackettstown (9–12) (S/R); Great Meadows (K-8)	Great Meadows CDP (305); Vienna CDP (881)
Knowlton; Township	20	township	2,894	1,212	25.33	0.58	24.75	123.4	49.0	North Warren (7–12); Knowlton (PK-6)	Columbia CDP (215); Delaware CDP (173); Hainesburg CDP (part; 422); Warrington
Liberty	14	township	2,670	1,151	11.87	0.26	11.60	253.6	99.2	Hackettstown (9–12) (S/R); Great Meadows (K-8)	Mountain Lake CDP (494); Townsbury
Lopatcong	8	township	8,776	3,420	7.16	0.06	7.10	1,129.0	481.8	Phillipsburg (9–12) (S/R); Lopatcong (PK-8)	Delaware Park CDP (739); Lopatcong Overlook CDP (692)
Mansfield; Township	15	township	7,781	3,316	29.93	0.11	29.82	259.1	111.2	Warren Hills (7–12); Mansfield (PK-6)	Anderson CDP (306); Beattystown CDP (4,701); Port Murray CDP (227)
Oxford; Township	12	township	2,444	1,033	5.89	0.10	5.79	434.5	178.5	Warren Hills (9–12) (S/R); Oxford (K-8)	Oxford CDP (1,033)
Phillipsburg	4	town	15,249	6,607	3.31	0.12	3.19	4,682.1	2,069.2	Phillipsburg	
Pohatcong	6	township	3,241	1,420	13.71	0.36	13.36	250.0	106.3	Phillipsburg (9–12) (S/R); Pohatcong (PK-8)	Carpentersville; Finesville CDP (364); Hughesville; Upper Pohatcong CDP (1,714)
Washington; Borough	2	borough	7,299	2,897	1.95	0.00	1.94	3,326.8	1,491.7	Warren Hills (7–12); Washington Borough (PK-6)	
Washington; Township	11	township	6,492	2,493	17.75	0.09	17.66	376.6	141.1	Warren Hills (7–12); Washington Township (PK-6)	Brass Castle CDP (1,536); Changewater; Port Colden CDP (260)
White	13	township	4,606	2,304	27.63	0.48	27.15	179.8	84.9	Belvidere (9–12) (S/R); White Township (PK-8)	Bridgeville CDP (229); Brookfield CDP (727); Buttzville CDP (205); Foul Rift (ghost town)
Warren County		county	109,632	44,925	362.86	5.94	356.92	304.5	125.9		

=== Historical municipalities ===
- Pahaquarry Township (1854-1997)

== Government ==
=== County government ===
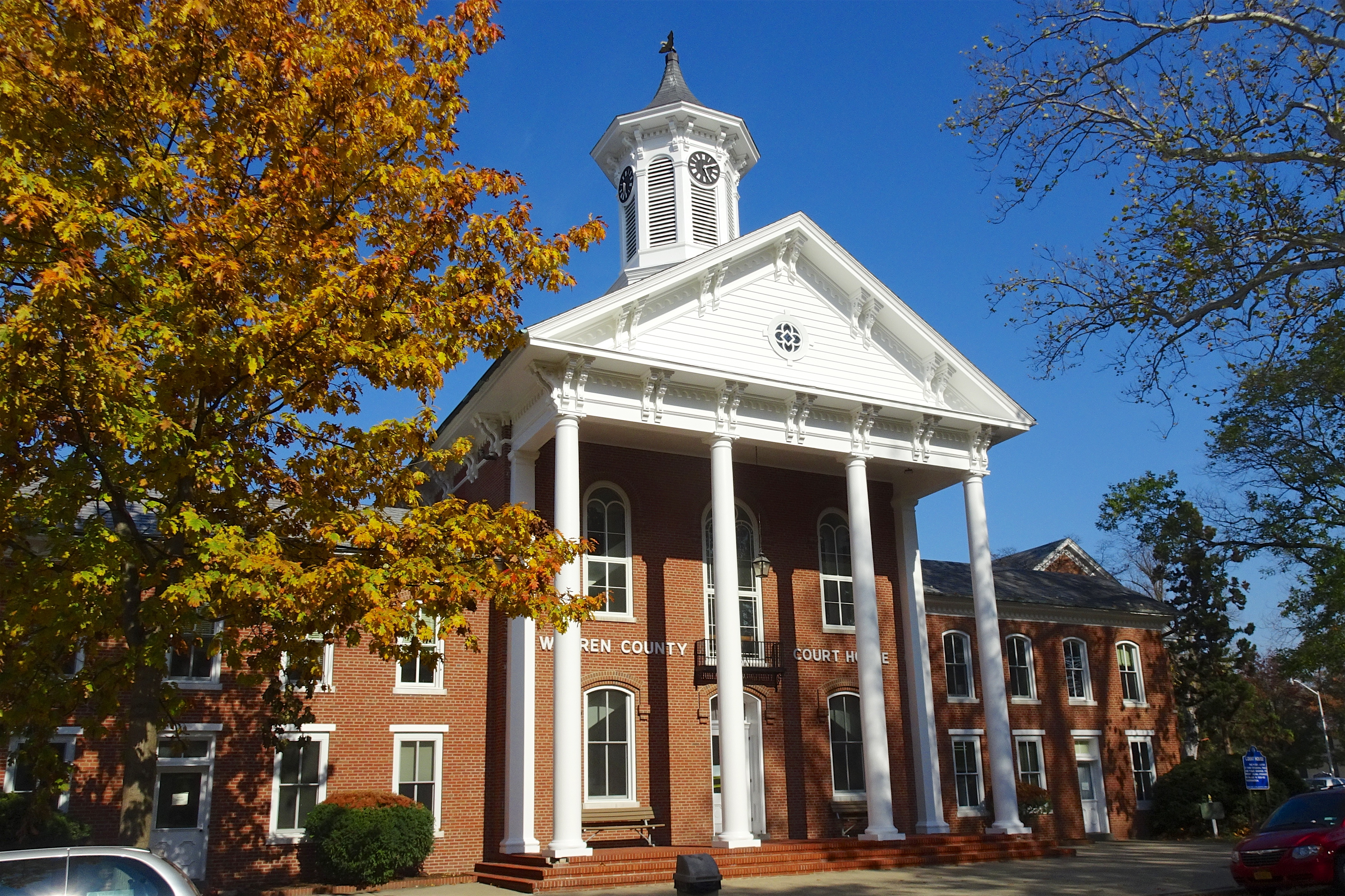
Warren County Courthouse in Belvidere, in November 2016

Warren County is governed by the three-member Warren County Board of County Commissioners who are chosen at-large on a staggered basis in partisan elections with one seat coming up for election each year as part of the November general election. At an annual reorganization meeting held at the beginning of January, the board selects one of its members to serve as director and another as deputy director. In 2016, commissioners were paid $24,000 and the head Commissioner had an annual salary of $25,000. As of 2025, Warren County's Commissioners are (with terms for director and deputy director ending every December 31):

Commissioner	Party, residence, term
Deputy Director James R. Kern III	R, Pohatcong Township, 2027
Commissioner Director Jason J. Sarnoski	R, Lopatcong Township, 2025
Lori Ciesla	R, Lopatcong Township, 2026

==== Former commissioners ====
No Democrat has been elected to countywide office since 1997.

- 2012–2018 Edward Smith (R)
- 2004–12 – Everett Chamberlain (R)
- 2010 – Angelo Accetturo (R)
- 2001–03 – Michael J. Doherty (R)
- 2001–09 – John DiMaio (R)
- 2000–02 – James DeBosh (D)
- 1997–99 – Stephen Lance (R)
- 1996-00 – Ann Stone (D)
- 1993-01 – Susan Dickey (R)
- 1989–94 – Jacob Matthenius (R)
- 1988–96 – Kenneth Miller (R)
- 1986–88 – Anthony Fowler (R)
- 1984–87 – Charles Lee (R)
- 1981–83 – George Thompson (R)
- 1980–82 – Kenneth Keyes (R)
- 1979–81 – Chuck Haytaian (R)
- 1977–79 – Christopher Maier (D)
- 1976–78 – Irene Smith (D)
- 1975–77 – Benjamin Bosco (D)
- 1974–76 – Raymond Stem (D)
- 1973–75 – Frank Seney (R)
- 1968–73 – Herman Shotwell (D)

Pursuant to Article VII Section II of the New Jersey State Constitution, each county in New Jersey is required to have three elected administrative officials known as "constitutional officers." These officers are the County Clerk and County Surrogate (both elected for five-year terms of office) and the County Sheriff (elected for a three-year term). Constitutional officers of Warren County are:

Title	Representative
County Clerk	Holly Mackey (R, Alpha, 2027)
Sheriff	Sheriff James McDonald Sr. (R, Phillipsburg, 2025)
Surrogate	Surrogate Michael J. Doherty (R, Washington Township, 2025)

The county's prosecutor is James L. Pfeiffer of Pohatcong, who was nominated by Governor of New Jersey Phil Murphy and sworn into office in November 2019 after being confirmed by the New Jersey Senate. Warren County is a part of Vicinage 13 of the New Jersey Superior Court (along with Somerset County and Hunterdon County), which is seated at the Somerset County Courthouse in Somerville; the Assignment Judge for Vicinage 15 is the Honorable Yolanda Ciccone. The Warren County Courthouse is in Belvidere. Law enforcement at the county level is provided by the Warren County Sheriff's Office and the Warren County Prosecutor's Office. Emergency services are provided by the Warren County Public Safety Department and the county's municipal fire and police departments.

=== Federal representatives ===
Warren County falls entirely within the 7th congressional district. For the 119th United States Congress, New Jersey's 7th congressional district is represented by Thomas Kean Jr. (R, Westfield).

=== State representatives ===
The 22 municipalities of Warren County are represented by two separate legislative districts.

District	Senator	Assembly	Municipalities
23rd	Michael J. Doherty (R)	John DiMaio (R) Erik Peterson (R)	Alpha, Belvidere, Blairstown, Frelinghuysen, Franklin Township, Greenwich Township, Hackettstown, Hardwick, Hope, Harmony, Knowlton, Liberty, Oxford Township, Lopatcong, Mansfield Township, Phillipsburg, Pohatcong, Washington Borough, Washington Township, White Township. The remainder of this district covers portions of Hunterdon and Somerset counties.
24th	Parker Space (R)	Dawn Fantasia (R) Mike Inganamort (R)	Allamuchy and Independence. The remainder of this district covers portions of Morris County and the entirety of Sussex County.

== Politics ==
United States presidential election results for Warren County, New Jersey
Year	Republican		Democratic		Third party(ies)	
Year	No.	%	No.	%	No.	%
1896	4,063	42.78%	5,013	52.79%	421	4.43%
1900	3,587	38.62%	5,219	56.20%	481	5.18%
1904	3,935	43.82%	4,368	48.64%	677	7.54%
1908	3,904	39.38%	5,662	57.12%	347	3.50%
1912	1,411	16.68%	4,663	55.14%	2,383	28.18%
1916	3,302	36.56%	5,374	59.50%	356	3.94%
1920	8,035	51.23%	7,218	46.02%	430	2.74%
1924	9,606	60.63%	5,186	32.73%	1,052	6.64%
1928	14,992	73.15%	5,444	26.56%	59	0.29%
1932	9,277	45.58%	10,636	52.25%	442	2.17%
1936	9,437	42.98%	12,476	56.82%	44	0.20%
1940	10,595	49.15%	10,929	50.70%	31	0.14%
1944	10,714	51.62%	10,024	48.30%	16	0.08%
1948	10,558	50.97%	9,972	48.14%	186	0.90%
1952	15,737	58.63%	11,074	41.26%	28	0.10%
1956	18,517	66.95%	9,128	33.00%	13	0.05%
1960	16,893	57.36%	12,540	42.58%	20	0.07%
1964	8,822	30.85%	19,755	69.09%	15	0.05%
1968	13,950	48.13%	12,822	44.24%	2,214	7.64%
1972	19,301	65.33%	10,008	33.88%	234	0.79%
1976	15,254	50.67%	14,238	47.29%	613	2.04%
1980	16,935	54.99%	10,510	34.13%	3,352	10.88%
1984	21,938	67.07%	10,647	32.55%	122	0.37%
1988	21,715	64.50%	11,640	34.57%	311	0.92%
1992	18,468	44.50%	13,002	31.33%	10,032	24.17%
1996	17,160	45.52%	14,805	39.27%	5,736	15.21%
2000	22,172	54.34%	16,543	40.55%	2,086	5.11%
2004	29,542	61.28%	18,044	37.43%	622	1.29%
2008	27,500	56.00%	20,628	42.01%	980	2.00%
2012	25,744	56.69%	18,745	41.27%	926	2.04%
2016	29,858	60.10%	17,281	34.78%	2,544	5.12%
2020	34,769	57.20%	24,901	40.96%	1,117	1.84%
2024	35,772	59.47%	23,318	38.77%	1,060	1.76%

Warren County has long been a consistently conservative county in local, state, and national elections, much like neighboring Sussex County. All of its state legislators and countywide elected officials are Republicans, as are the vast majority of municipal officials. The county has not backed a Democrat for president since 1964, and has only done so four times since 1920. No Democrat has carried the county in a gubernatorial election since 1977. As of June 1, 2024, there were a total of 87,537 registered voters in Warren County, of whom 35,756 (40.8%) were registered as Republicans, 23,346 (26.7%) were registered as Democrats and 26,938 (30.8%) were registered as unaffiliated. There were 1,497 voters (1.7%) registered to other parties.

Senate Class 1 election results

United States Senate election results for Warren County, New Jersey1
Year	Republican		Democratic		Third party(ies)	
Year	No.	%	No.	%	No.	%
2024	34,074	58.45%	22,758	39.04%	1,462	2.51%
2018	24,357	59.99%	14,452	35.59%	1,794	4.42%
2012	24,046	56.17%	17,904	41.83%	856	2.00%
2006	17,011	58.64%	10,785	37.18%	1,212	4.18%
2000	24,186	60.53%	13,841	34.64%	1,932	4.83%
1994	17,364	61.52%	9,907	35.10%	955	3.38%
1988	17,774	53.16%	15,307	45.78%	356	1.06%
1982	12,000	52.05%	10,736	46.57%	319	1.38%

Senate Class 2 election results

United States Senate election results for Warren County, New Jersey2
Year	Republican		Democratic		Third party(ies)	
Year	No.	%	No.	%	No.	%
2020	33,893	56.83%	24,124	40.45%	1,623	2.72%
2014	14,150	59.85%	8,609	36.41%	884	3.74%
2013	11,069	64.76%	5,812	34.00%	211	1.23%
2008	27,258	58.87%	18,019	38.91%	1,027	2.22%
2002	17,423	57.05%	11,044	36.16%	2,074	6.79%
1996	20,194	55.10%	13,932	38.01%	2,523	6.88%
1990	11,820	49.12%	11,722	48.72%	520	2.16%
1984	13,248	40.74%	18,987	58.39%	283	0.87%

=== State elections ===
Governor election results

Gubernatorial election results for Warren County, New Jersey
Year	Republican		Democratic		Third party(ies)	
Year	No.	%	No.	%	No.	%
2025	25,980	57.09%	19,199	42.19%	326	0.72%
2021	23,739	64.23%	12,774	34.56%	444	1.20%
2017	17,409	61.23%	10,065	35.40%	958	3.37%
2013	19,858	72.59%	6,855	25.06%	645	2.36%
2009	20,174	62.35%	8,446	26.10%	3,736	11.55%
2005	18,003	57.86%	11,460	36.83%	1,654	5.32%
2001	15,668	52.84%	12,554	42.33%	1,432	4.83%
1997	15,413	50.47%	11,331	37.11%	3,793	12.42%
1993	17,667	57.02%	12,215	39.42%	1,101	3.55%
1989	13,224	52.10%	11,615	45.76%	542	2.14%
1985	14,499	70.43%	5,869	28.51%	219	1.06%
1981	13,649	58.22%	9,296	39.65%	500	2.13%
1977	8,819	39.19%	13,078	58.11%	607	2.70%
1973	5,414	25.35%	15,838	74.16%	104	0.49%
1969	11,161	45.78%	13,057	53.55%	163	0.67%
1965	14,868	58.27%	10,422	40.84%	227	0.89%
1961	10,299	45.54%	12,262	54.22%	55	0.24%
1957	8,411	35.64%	15,176	64.31%	10	0.04%
1953	7,224	29.92%	16,788	69.53%	133	0.55%

== Transportation ==
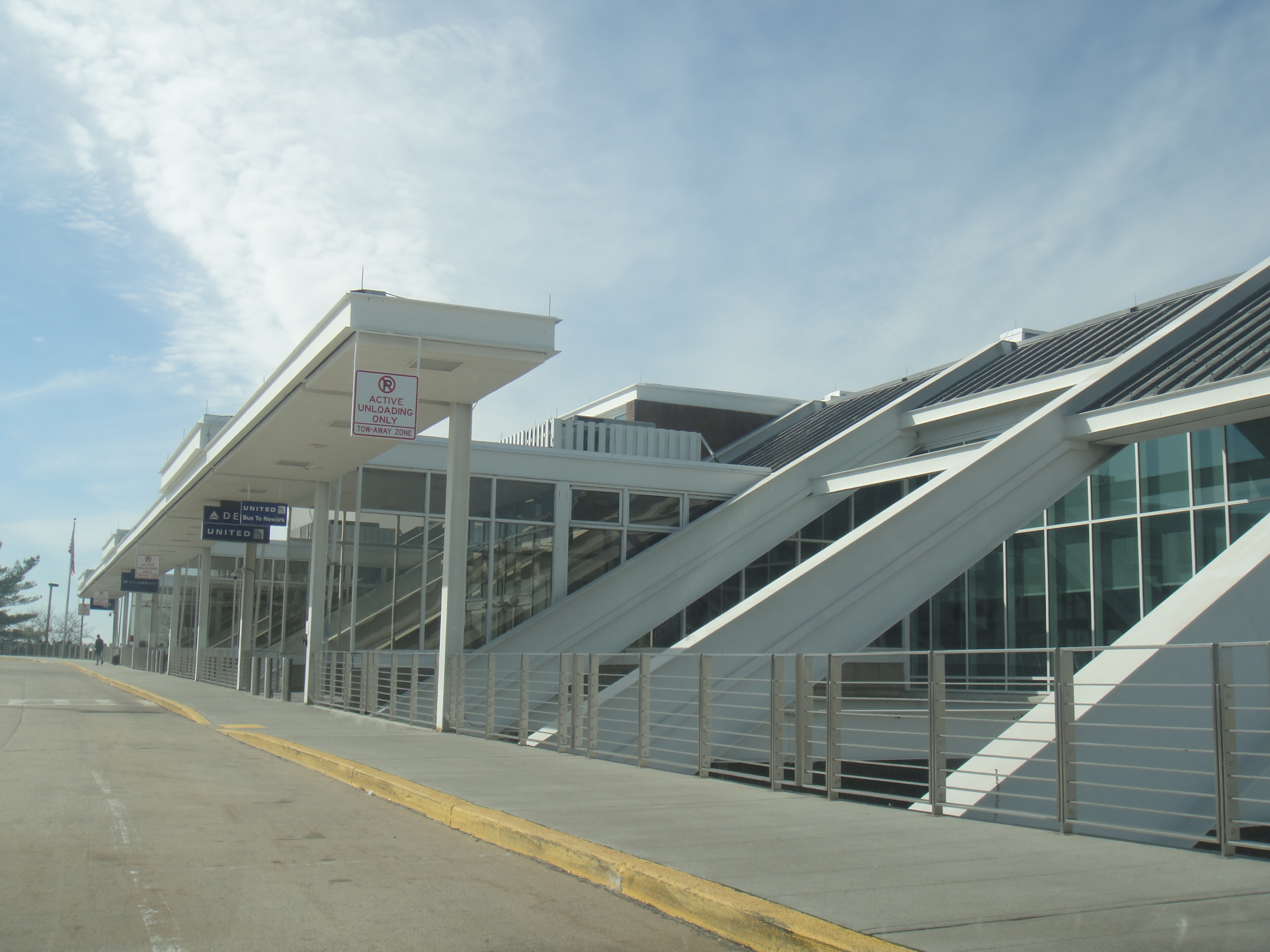
Lehigh Valley International Airport outside Allentown in March 2014

=== Roads and highways ===
As of 2010, the county had a total of 1,055.07 miles (1,697.97 km) of roadways, of which 690.53 miles (1,111.30 km) were maintained by the local municipality, 256.15 miles (412.23 km) by Warren County and 103.20 miles (166.08 km) by the New Jersey Department of Transportation and 5.19 miles (8.35 km) by the Delaware River Joint Toll Bridge Commission.

The county has a few notable state and federal roads. The chief state routes are Route 31, a north–south road that runs from Buttzville in White Township to Trenton, and Route 57 that runs between Lopatcong Township to Hackettstown. Route 94 in the northern part runs through Blairstown into New York state via Newton and the rest of Sussex County. Route 173 runs near Bloomsbury into Hunterdon County, terminating at Clinton and Annandale. Route 182 serves as one of the commercial areas of Hackettstown, & Route 122 serves as one of the commercial areas of Phillipsburg. The US Routes are U.S. Route 22 in the Phillipsburg area and U.S. Route 46 runs from Columbia to Hackettstown in the northern section. The two interstates that pass through are the Phillipsburg-Newark Expressway (Interstate 78), and the Bergen-Passaic Expressway (Interstate 80).

=== Air ===
By air, the county is served by Lehigh Valley International Airport in Allentown. Newark Liberty International Airport in Newark is located east of the county.

=== Bus ===
Warren County contracts with Easton Coach to provide demand-responsive service and limited fixed-route service along the Route 31 and Route 57 corridors. NJ Transit operates the No. 890 and No. 891 buses in the Phillipsburg area.

=== Rail ===
Warren County has a single NJ Transit train stop, located at the Hackettstown station on the Montclair-Boonton Line and the Morristown Line.

Norfolk Southern Railway's Lehigh Line, formerly the mainline of the Lehigh Valley Railroad, runs through southern Warren County on its way to Phillipsburg.

== Education ==
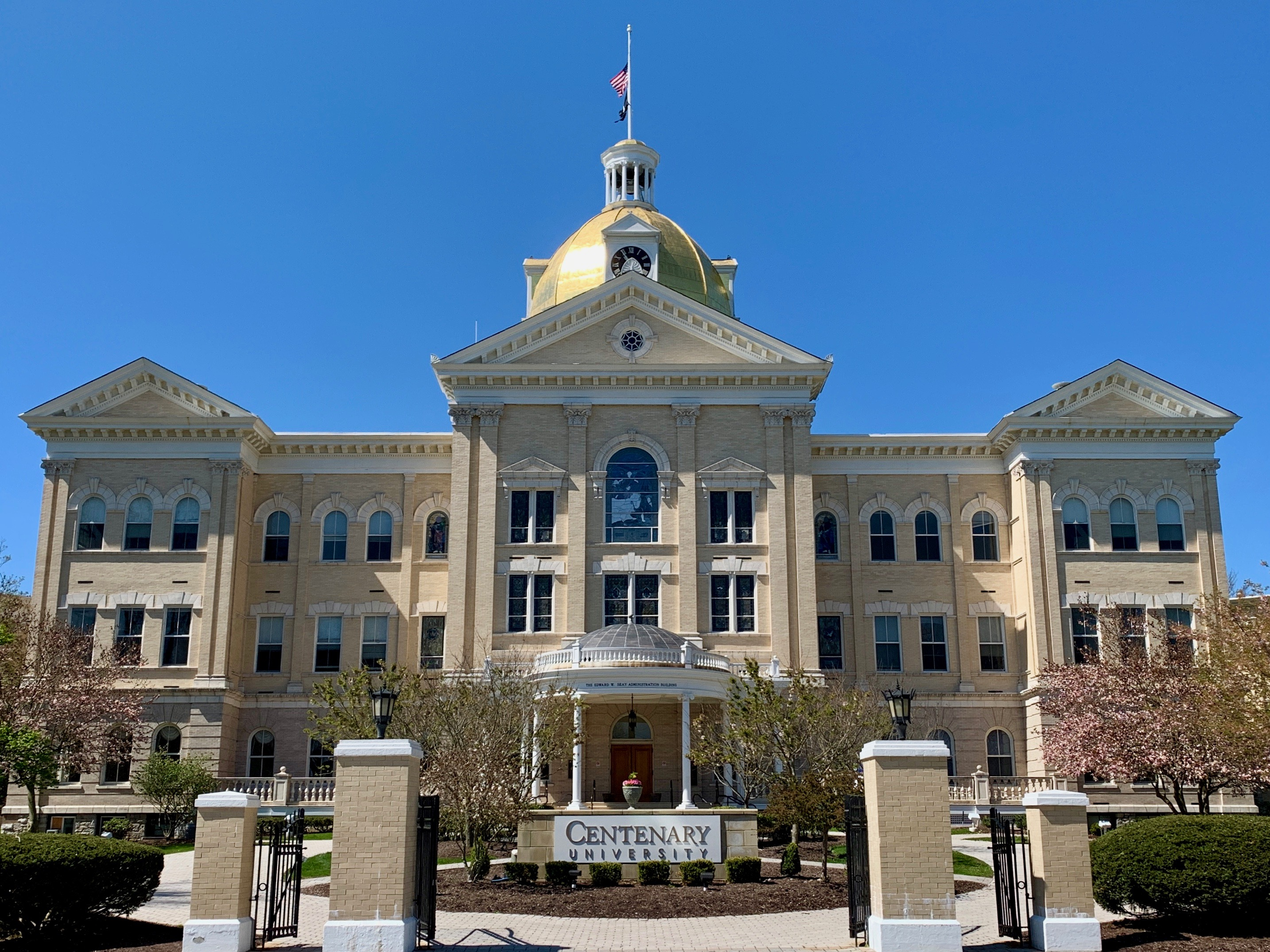
Centenary University in Hackettstown in April 2020

=== Colleges ===
- Centenary University is a private college located in Hackettstown that is affiliated with the United Methodist Church.
- Warren County Community College, in Washington Township, offers both associate and bachelor's degree programs and certificate programs. The college serves approximately 1,700 full-time and part-time students, in addition to students in non-credit programs and courses. The college is able to offer bachelor programs through partnerships with four-year colleges.

=== Private secondary schools ===
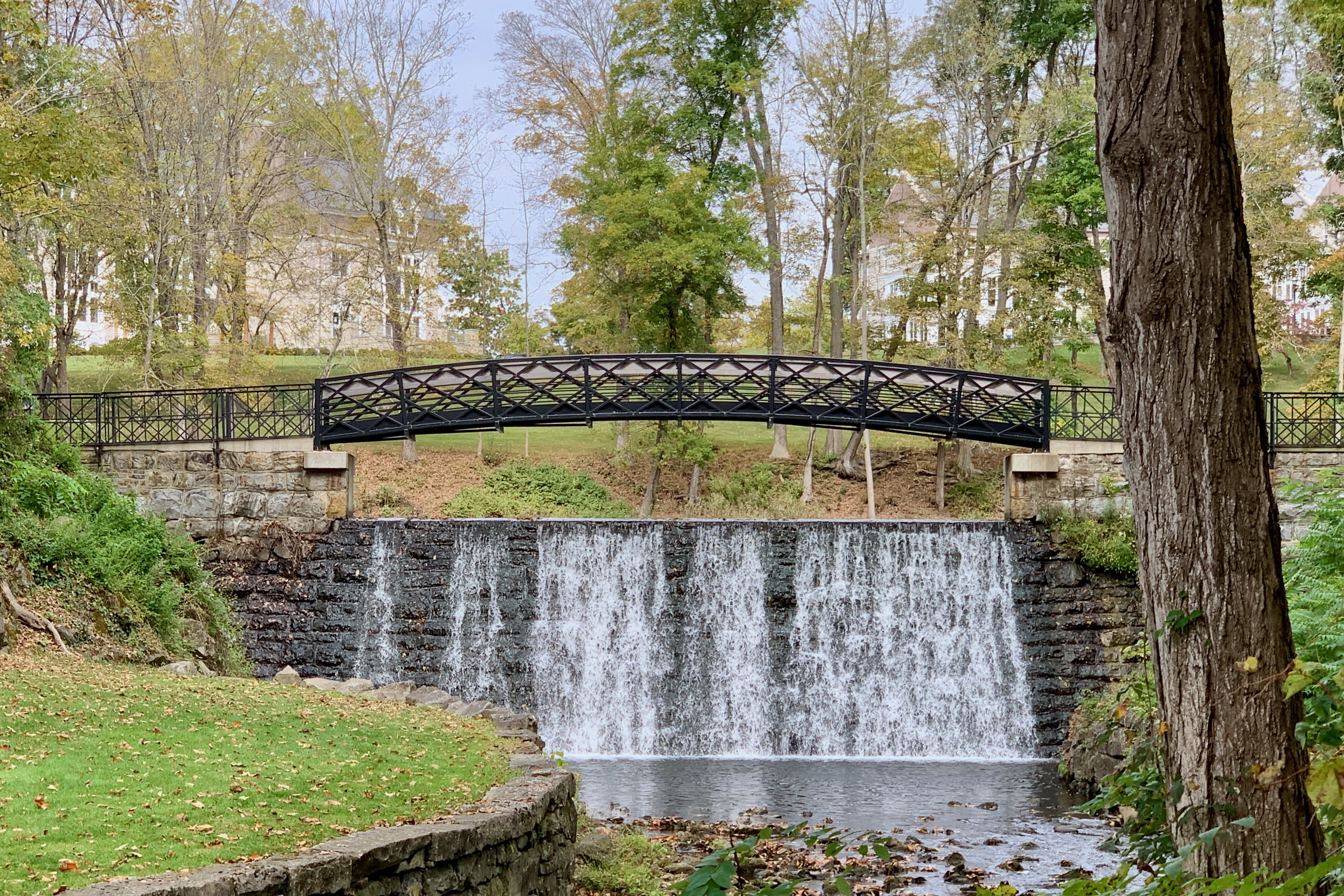
The waterfall and footbridge at Blair Academy, a private boarding school in Blairstown, in October 2020

- Blair Academy is a college preparatory school located in Blairstown, founded in 1848 with a gift from John Insley Blair.

=== School districts ===
School districts in Warren County include:

K-12 districts

- Belvidere School District
- Hackettstown School District
- Phillipsburg School District
- Warren County Special Services School District

Secondary districts

- North Warren Regional High School 7–12
- Warren County Vocational School District 9–12
- Warren Hills Regional School District 7–12

Elementary districts

- Alpha School District K–8
- Allamuchy Township School District K–8
- Blairstown Township School District K–6
- Franklin Township School District (Warren County, New Jersey) K–6
- Frelinghuysen Township School District K–6
- Great Meadows Regional School District K–8
- Greenwich Township School District K–8
- Harmony Township School District K–8
- Hope Township School District K–8
- Knowlton Township School District K–6
- Lopatcong Township School District K–8
- Mansfield Township School District K–6
- Oxford Township School District K–8
- Pohatcong Township School District K–8
- Washington Borough Public Schools K–6
- Washington Township School District K–6
- White Township School District K–8

==== Public high schools ====
- Belvidere High School, a part of the Belvidere School District (PreK-12) with students attending from Harmony, Hope and White townships
- Hackettstown High School, a part of the Hackettstown School District (PreK-12) with students from Allamuchy, Independence, and Liberty townships
- North Warren Regional High School, which serves the northern townships of Blairstown (where the school is located), Frelinghuysen, Hardwick and Knowlton
- Phillipsburg High School, a part of the Phillipsburg School District (PreK-12) with students attending from Alpha Borough and the Townships of Greenwich, Lopatcong and Pohatcong.
- Warren County Technical School serves the entire county. It includes grades 9–12 and also has a post secondary night school.
- Warren Hills Regional High School, a part of the Warren Hills Regional School District that serves the Borough of Washington, and the Townships of Washington, Mansfield, Franklin and Oxford (9–12 only)

== Parks and Recreation ==
Warren County borders the Delaware Water Gap National Recreation Area and the Middle Delaware National Scenic River. Warren County has many areas for hunting and fishing. The New Jersey Division of Fish and Wildlife houses its Pequest Fish Hatchery, which produces trout and other fish, in Warren County about five miles northeast of Oxford, along U.S. Route 46. Thousands of trout are raised in this hatchery and also serves as an educational center for other outdoor activity. Wildlife Management Areas in the county include White Lake, Oxford Lake, and the Pequest River W.M.A. The five major rivers or creeks for fishing in Warren County are the Paulinskill, the Pequest, the Musconetcong, Pohatcong Creek, as well as the Delaware River. Merrill Creek Reservoir, located in Harmony Township, is also stocked with fish and has game in the surrounding woods.

== See also ==
- Musconetcong County, New Jersey, a proposed county in the 19th Century from parts of Warren and Hunterdon Counties
- National Register of Historic Places listings in Warren County, New Jersey
