= North Warren Regional High School =

School in Blairstown, New Jersey

North Warren Regional School District

Address
- 10 Noe Road Blairstown, Warren County, New Jersey, 07825; United States
- Coordinates: 40.982175°N 74.990516°W

District information
- Grades: 7-12
- Superintendent: Patrick Ketch
- Business administrator: Angela Moyer (interim)
- Schools: 1

Students and staff
- Enrollment: 582 (as of 2024–25)
- Faculty: 52.4 FTEs
- Student–teacher ratio: 11.1:1

Other information
- District Factor Group: FG
- Website: www.northwarren.org
Ind.	Per pupil	District spending	Rank (*)	7-12 average	%± vs. average
1A	Total Spending	$17,332	4	$18,891	−8.3%
1	Budgetary Cost	13,962	11	14,586	−4.3%
2	Classroom Instruction	8,184	15	8,339	−1.9%
6	Support Services	1,884	11	2,114	−10.9%
8	Administrative Cost	1,840	37	1,561	17.9%
10	Operations & Maintenance	1,165	1	1,798	−35.2%
13	Extracurricular Activities	889	26	673	32.1%
16	Median Teacher Salary	57,685	3	65,769
Data from NJDoE 2014 Taxpayers' Guide to Education Spending. *Of 7-12 districts with any number of students. Lowest spending=1; Highest=47

North Warren Regional High School
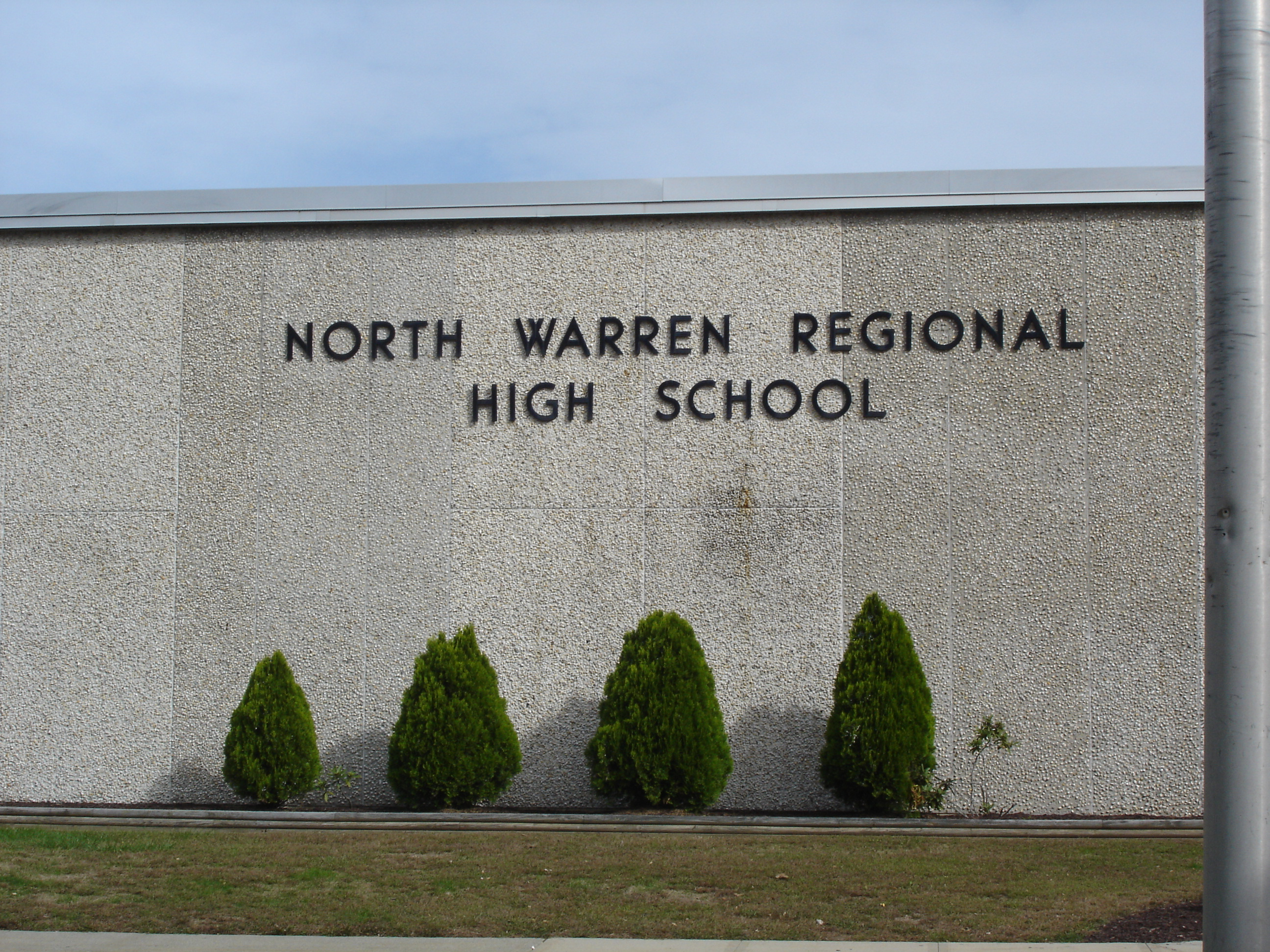

Information
- Type: Public high school
- Motto: "Students of Today, Leaders of Tomorrow"
- Established: 1970
- NCES School ID: 340955005844
- Principal: Chris Carrubba
- Faculty: 52.4 FTEs
- Grades: 7-12
- Enrollment: 582 (as of 2024–25)
- Student to teacher ratio: 11.1:1
- Colors: Red white and blue
- Athletics conference: Skyland Conference (general); North Jersey Super Football Conference (football)
- Team name: Patriots
- Accreditation: Middle States Association of Colleges and Schools

North Warren Regional High School is a public high school and regional school district, located in Warren County, in the U.S. state of New Jersey, that serves students in seventh grade through twelfth grade from the four constituent townships of Blairstown (where the school is located), Frelinghuysen, Hardwick and Knowlton. It is the only school in the North Warren Regional School District. The school opened in September 1970, replacing the former Blairstown High School. The school has been accredited by the Middle States Association of Colleges and Schools Commission on Elementary and Secondary Schools since 1984; the school is accredited with stipulations until July 2031. The high school is the lone facility of the North Warren Regional High School District.

As of the 2024–25 school year, the school had an enrollment of 582 students and 52.4 classroom teachers (on an FTE basis), for a student–teacher ratio of 11.1:1. There were 80 students (13.7% of enrollment) eligible for free lunch and 21 (3.6% of students) eligible for reduced-cost lunch.

The district had been classified by the New Jersey Department of Education as being in District Factor Group "FG", the fourth-highest of eight groupings. District Factor Groups organize districts statewide to allow comparison by common socioeconomic characteristics of the local districts. From lowest socioeconomic status to highest, the categories are A, B, CD, DE, FG, GH, I and J.

== Awards, recognition and rankings ==
The school was the 87th-ranked public high school in New Jersey out of 339 schools statewide in New Jersey Monthly magazine's September 2014 cover story on the state's "Top Public High Schools", using a new ranking methodology. The school had been ranked 115th in the state of 328 schools in 2012, after being ranked 138th in 2010 out of 322 schools listed. The magazine ranked the school 194th in 2008 out of 316 schools. The school was ranked 167th in the magazine's September 2006 issue, which surveyed 316 schools across the state. Schooldigger.com ranked the school 156th out of 381 public high schools statewide in its 2011 rankings (an increase of 47 positions from the 2010 ranking) which were based on the combined percentage of students classified as proficient or above proficient on the mathematics (80.8%) and language arts literacy (95.5%) components of the High School Proficiency Assessment (HSPA).

== Extracurricular activities ==
=== The Marching Patriots ===
In their 2007 competition season, the Marching Band earned 1st place in New Jersey for group 3A. In their 2008 competition season, the Marching Band earned 3rd place at the USSBA Group 3A championships held at Hershey, Pennsylvania on November 2, 2008. In their 2009 competition season, the Marching band earned 1st place in New Jersey for group 3A, winning the caption awards for Best Music and Best Visual Effect, as well as taking best in show. In their 2010 competition season, the Marching band earned 1st place in New Jersey for group 3A, again.

In 2013, the band had an undefeated season, finishing 7-0 and earned first place in New Jersey Group 3A state championship held at Rutgers University. The band also earned the title of 2013 USBands Group III A National Champions at Metlife Stadium, receiving an all-time high record score of 96.425.

In 2017, the band finished in first place in New Jersey Group III Open state championship held at Rutgers University.

=== Aurora Indoor Color Guard ===
From 1989 to 1994 North Warren Regional High School was also home to the award-winning Aurora Indoor Color Guard. Aurora began as a Scholastic Novice guard in the TIDA circuit, moving up to a Scholastic Intermediate guard in 1992, and moving up to a Scholastic Advanced guard in 1993. Also in 1993, performing to "I Melt With You" by Modern English, Aurora placed 8th in the world at the WGI World Championships in Dayton, Ohio as a WGI Scholastic A class Finalist. In May 1994, the Aurora indoor color guard performed for the last time, in Wildwood, New Jersey.

=== Athletics ===
The North Warren Regional High School Patriots compete in the Northwest Jersey Athletic Conference, which is comprised of public and private high schools in Morris, Sussex and Warren counties in northwestern New Jersey, and operates under the jurisdiction of the New Jersey State Interscholastic Athletic Association (NJSIAA), having been established following a reorganization of sports leagues in Northern New Jersey by the New Jersey State Interscholastic Athletic Association (NJSIAA). With 407 students in grades 10-12, the school was classified by the NJSIAA for the 2019–20 school year as Group I for most athletic competition purposes, which included schools with an enrollment of 75 to 476 students in that grade range. The football team competes in the National Blue division of the North Jersey Super Football Conference, which includes 112 schools competing in 20 divisions, making it the nation's biggest football-only high school sports league. The school was classified by the NJSIAA as Group I North for football for 2024–2026, which included schools with 254 to 474 students.

The school participates as the host school / lead agency for joint cooperative boys' / girls' lacrosse teams with Belvidere High School, while Belvidere is the host school for boys' and girls' spring track and field, all expiring in June 2028. Belvidere is the host for co-op boys' wrestling and a girls' wrestling team shared with North Warren and Hackettstown High School, which operate under agreements scheduled to expire in June 2030.

The boys' soccer team won the Group I state championship in 2002 and 2003, defeating Arthur P. Schalick High School in the tournament final both seasons. The 2002 team finished the season with a record of 16–3–1 after winning the Group I title against Schalick by a score of 4–3 in overtime in the tournament final. The following year, North Warren again met Schalick in the 2003 Group I state championship and won 2–0 at the end of regulation to finish the season 17–3–1.

The boys' wrestling team won the North I Group I state sectional championship in 2006 and 2007.

== Notable alumni ==
- David T. Little (born 1978), composer, record producer, and drummer known for his operatic, orchestral, and chamber works, most notably his operas JFK, Soldier Songs, and Dog Days.

== Administration ==
Core members of the administration are:

District

- Patrick Ketch, superintendent
- Angela Moyer, interim business administrator and board secretary

School

- Chris Carrubba, principal

== Board of education ==
The district's nine-member board of education sets policy and oversees the fiscal and educational operation of the district through its administration. As a Type II school district, the board's trustees are elected directly by voters to serve three-year terms of office on a staggered basis, with three seats up for election each year held (since 2012) as part of the November general election. The board appoints a superintendent to oversee the district's day-to-day operations and a business administrator to supervise the business functions of the district. Seats on the board of education are allocated based on the population of the constituent municipalities, with four seats assigned to Blairstown Township, two to Frelinghuysen Township, two to Knowlton Township and one to Hardwick Township.
