= Belvidere School District =

School district in Warren County, New Jersey, US

Address
- 809 Oxford Street Belvidere, Warren County, New Jersey, 07823; United States
- Coordinates: 40.824041°N 75.065671°W

District information
- Grades: PreK-12
- Superintendent: Jessica Garcia
- Business administrator: Rachelle Tjalma
- Schools: 2

Students and staff
- Enrollment: 580 (as of 2023–24)
- Faculty: 55.4 FTEs
- Student–teacher ratio: 10.5:1

Other information
- District Factor Group: DE
- Website: www.belvideresd.org
Ind.	Per pupil	District spending	Rank (*)	K-12 average	%± vs. average
1A	Total Spending	$16,562	10	$18,891	−12.3%
1	Budgetary Cost	14,678	31	14,783	−0.7%
2	Classroom Instruction	8,354	26	8,763	−4.7%
6	Support Services	1,882	19	2,392	−21.3%
8	Administrative Cost	1,983	48	1,485	33.5%
10	Operations & Maintenance	1,778	35	1,783	−0.3%
13	Extracurricular Activities	667	44	268	148.9%
16	Median Teacher Salary	54,710	11	64,043
Data from NJDoE 2014 Taxpayers' Guide to Education Spending. *Of K-12 districts with up to 1,800 students. Lowest spending=1; Highest=49

The Belvidere School District is a comprehensive community public school district that serves students in pre-kindergarten through twelfth grade from Belvidere in Warren County, in the U.S. state of New Jersey.

As of the 2023–24 school year, the district, comprised of two schools, had an enrollment of 580 students and 55.4 classroom teachers (on an FTE basis), for a student–teacher ratio of 10.5:1.

Students from Harmony Township, Hope Township and White Township attend the district's high school as part of sending/receiving relationships with the respective districts.

== History ==
As part of a cost-saving measure, Third Street School was closed after the 2018–19 school year and merged into Oxford Street Elementary School.

The district had been classified by the New Jersey Department of Education as being in District Factor Group "DE", the fifth-highest of eight groupings. District Factor Groups organize districts statewide to allow comparison by common socioeconomic characteristics of the local districts. From lowest socioeconomic status to highest, the categories are A, B, CD, DE, FG, GH, I and J.

The district had participated in the Interdistrict Public School Choice Program, having been approved on July 14, 2000, to participate in the program. Seats in the program for non-resident students were specified by the district and allocated by lottery, with tuition paid for participating students by the New Jersey Department of Education.

== Schools ==
Schools in the district (with 2023–24 enrollment data from the National Center for Education Statistics) are:

Elementary school

- Belvidere Elementary School with 259 students in grades PreK–8
  - Jessica McKinney, principal

High school

- Belvidere High School with 318 students in grades 9–12
  - Christopher Karabinus, principal

== Administration ==
Senior members of the district's administration are:

- Jessica Garcia, superintendent
- Rachelle Tjalma, business administrator and board secretary

== Board of education ==
The district's board of education is composed of nine members who set policy and oversee the fiscal and educational operation of the district through its administration. As a Type II school district, the board's trustees are elected directly by voters to serve three-year terms of office on a staggered basis, with three seats up for election each year held (since 2012) as part of the November general election. The board appoints a superintendent to oversee the district's day-to-day operations and a business administrator to supervise the business functions of the district. The board includes an additional member from each of the three sending districts.
