= Belvidere High School (New Jersey) =

High school in Warren County, New Jersey, US

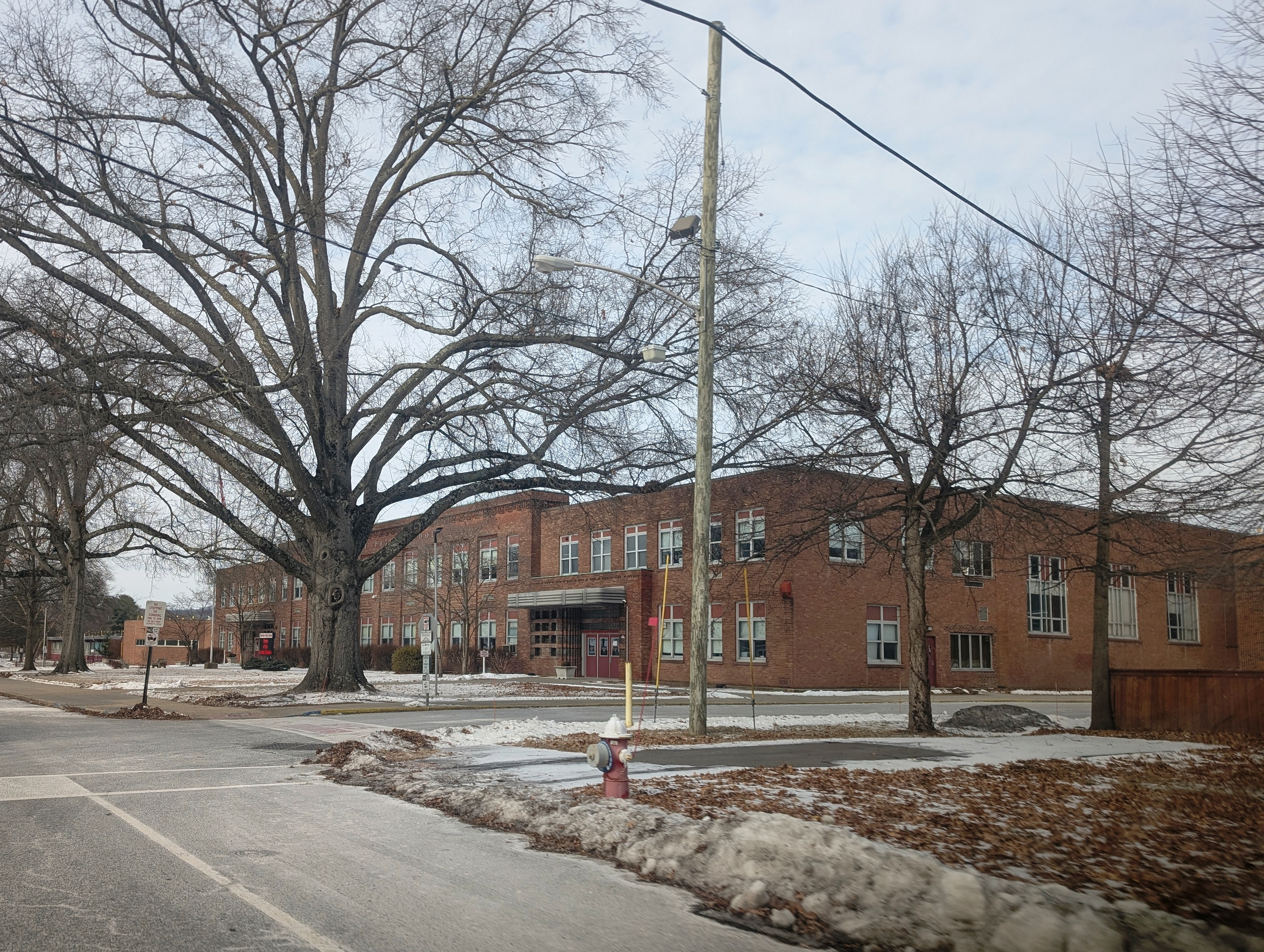

Location
- 809 Oxford Street; Belvidere, Warren County, New Jersey 07823; United States
- Coordinates: 40.824041°N 75.065671°W

Information
- Type: Public high school
- School district: Belvidere School District
- NCES School ID: 340144005794
- Principal: Christopher Karabinus
- Faculty: 25.9 FTEs
- Grades: 9-12
- Enrollment: 303 (as of 2024–25)
- Student to teacher ratio: 11.7:1
- Campus type: Town: Fringe
- Colors: Scarlet and white
- Athletics conference: Skyland Conference (general); Big Central Football Conference (football)
- Team name: County Seaters
- Newspaper: Seater Scoop
- Yearbook: The Clarion
- Website: bhs.belvideresd.org

Belvidere High School is a four-year comprehensive public high school serving students in ninth through twelfth grades from Belvidere, in Warren County, in the U.S. state of New Jersey, operating as part of the Belvidere School District.

Students from Harmony, Hope and White townships attend Belvidere High School as part of sending/receiving relationships with the respective school districts.

As of the 2024–25 school year, the school had an enrollment of 303 students and 25.9 classroom teachers (on an FTE basis), for a student–teacher ratio of 11.7:1. There were 75 students (24.8% of enrollment) eligible for free lunch and 9 (3.0% of students) eligible for reduced-cost lunch.

== Awards, recognition and rankings ==
The school was the 117th-ranked public high school in New Jersey out of 339 schools statewide in New Jersey Monthly magazine's September 2014 cover story on the state's "Top Public High Schools", using a new ranking methodology. The school had been ranked 189th in the state of 328 schools in 2012, after being ranked 250th in 2010 out of 322 schools listed. The magazine ranked the school 250th in 2008 out of 316 schools. The school was ranked 251st in the magazine's September 2006 issue, which surveyed 316 schools across the state.

== Athletics ==
The Belvidere High School County Seaters athletic teams compete in the Valley Division of the Skyland Conference, which is comprised of public and private high schools in Hunterdon, Somerset and Warren counties, and operates under the supervision of the New Jersey State Interscholastic Athletic Association (NJSIAA). With 315 students in grades 10-12, the school was classified by the NJSIAA for the 2019–20 school year as Group I for most athletic competition purposes, which included schools with an enrollment of 75 to 476 students in that grade range. The football team competes in Division 1B of the Big Central Football Conference, which includes 60 public and private high schools in Hunterdon, Middlesex, Somerset, Union and Warren counties, which are broken down into 10 divisions by size and location. The school was classified by the NJSIAA as Group I North for football for 2024–2026, which included schools with 254 to 474 students. Interscholastic sports offered include football, baseball, softball, basketball, cross country, swimming, cheerleading, golf, wrestling, field hockey, and soccer.

The school participates as the host school / lead agency for joint cooperative boys / girls swimming teams with North Warren Regional High School, while North Warren is the host school for co-op boys / girls lacrosse teams. These co-op programs operate under agreements scheduled to expire at the end of the 2023–24 school year.

The baseball team won the North II Group I state sectional championship in 1965.

The field hockey team won the North II Group I state sectional championships in 1982, 1988, 1989, 1990, 1991 and 1996, and won the combined North I / II Group I title in 1992. The team was Group I co-champion in 1989 (with Haddonfield Memorial High School) and won the Group I title outright in 1990 (vs. South Hunterdon Regional High School). The 1989 team finished the season with a 9-2-2 record after a scoreless tie with Haddonfield after regulation and overtime in the Group I championship game. The team finished the season 18-2-1 after winning the 1990 Group I state championship game with a 1-0 defeat of a South Hunterdon team that had beaten Belvidere twice and tied once in their three meetings before the finals.

The boys wrestling team won the North II Group I state sectional championships in 1996 and 1999-2001.

The 1999 football team finished the season with an 11-1 record after winning the North II Group I state sectional championship with a 6-0 win against New Providence High School in the playoff finals.

The girls soccer team won the North II, Group I state sectional championship in 2005 with a 1-0 win over North Arlington High School. The team won the North I, Group I state sectional title in a shootout after overtime ended in a 2-2 tie with Cresskill High School.

== Activities and clubs ==
Clubs offered at Belvidere include Marching Band, Color Guard, Madrigals, Chorus, S.T.A.N.D, Diversity Club, FFA, Student Government, a science club, a book club, a running club, Seater Scoop (school newspaper), HOPE Club, Leo Club, Yearbook Club, Environmental Club, National Honor Society and French National Honor Society.

== Administration ==
The school's principal is Christopher Karabinus.

== Notable alumni ==
- Dan Gray (born 1956), defensive tackle who played in the NFL for the Detroit Lions
- Don Reitz (1929–2014), ceramic artist who specialized in salt glaze pottery
