= Warren Hills Regional School District =

School district in Warren County, New Jersey, US

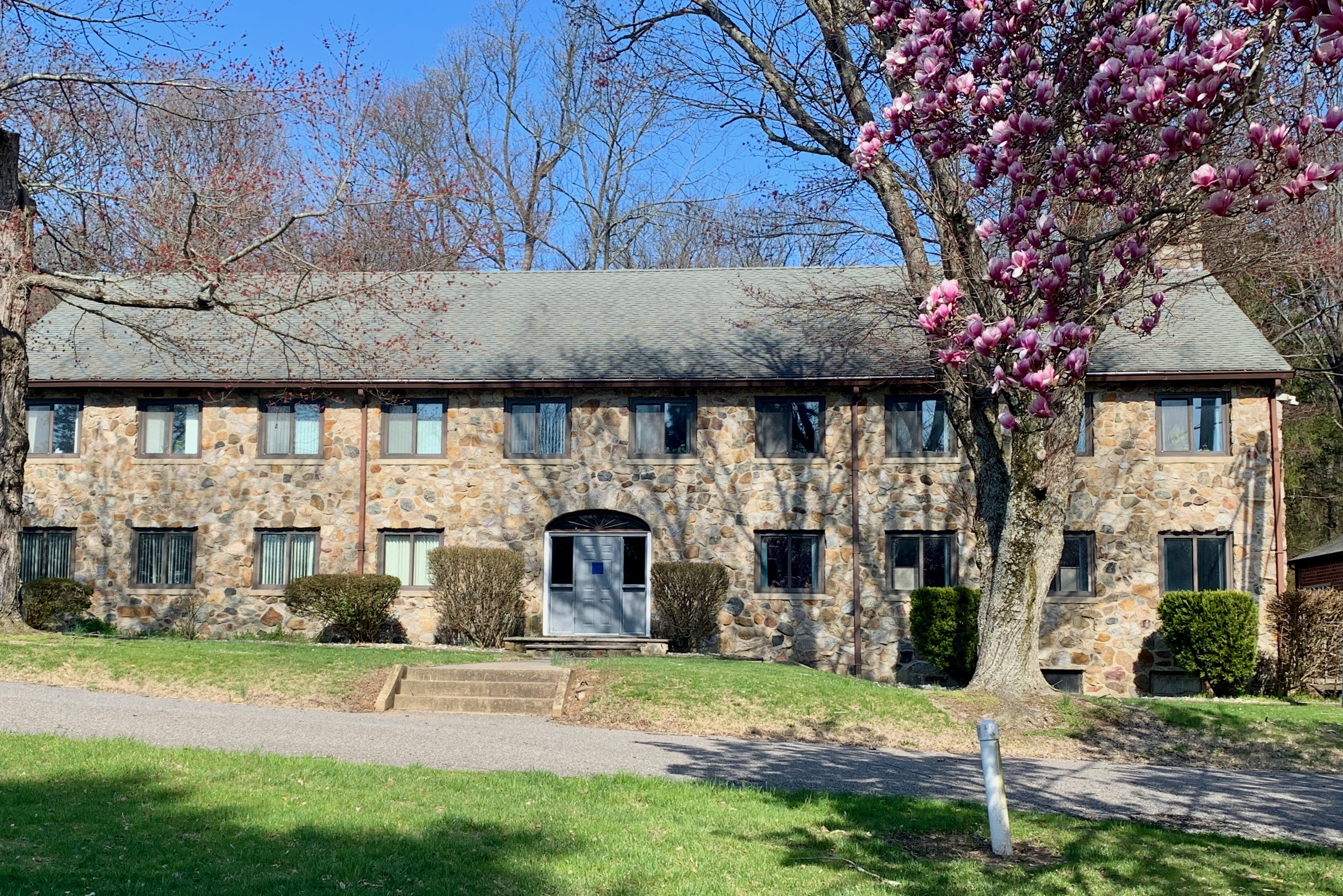
- District offices in Bowerstown

Address
- 89 Bowerstown Road Washington, Warren County, New Jersey, 07882; United States
- Coordinates: 40.771351°N 74.998964°W

District information
- Grades: 7-12
- Established: 1967
- Superintendent: Earl C. Clymer III
- Business administrator: Donnamarie Palmiere
- Schools: 2

Students and staff
- Enrollment: 1,573 (as of 2023–24)
- Faculty: 142.3 FTEs
- Student–teacher ratio: 11.1:1

Other information
- District Factor Group: FG
- Website: www.warrenhills.org
| Ind. | Per pupil | District spending | Rank (*) | 7-12 average | %± vs. average |
|---|---|---|---|---|---|
| 1A | Total Spending | $19,393 | 13 | $18,891 | 2.7% |
| 1 | Budgetary Cost | 15,513 | 20 | 14,586 | 6.4% |
| 2 | Classroom Instruction | 8,553 | 18 | 8,339 | 2.6% |
| 6 | Support Services | 2,536 | 30 | 2,114 | 20.0% |
| 8 | Administrative Cost | 1,764 | 33 | 1,561 | 13.0% |
| 10 | Operations & Maintenance | 1,801 | 18 | 1,798 | 0.2% |
| 13 | Extracurricular Activities | 846 | 22 | 673 | 25.7% |
| 16 | Median Teacher Salary | 72,043 | 32 | 65,769 |
Data from NJDoE 2014 Taxpayers' Guide to Education Spending. *Of 7-12 districts with any number of students. Lowest spending=1; Highest=47

Warren Hills Regional School District

The Warren Hills Regional School District is comprehensive public school district located in Warren County, in the U.S. state of New Jersey, that serves seventh grade through twelfth grades. The district includes students from the municipalities of Franklin Township, Mansfield Township, Washington Borough and Washington Township, while students from Oxford Township attend the district's high school for grades 9-12 as part of a sending/receiving relationship.

As of the 2023–24 school year, the district, comprised of two schools, had an enrollment of 1,573 students and 142.3 classroom teachers (on an FTE basis), for a student–teacher ratio of 11.1:1.

Both Warren Hills Regional Middle School and Warren Hills Regional High School are accredited through the Middle States Association of Colleges and Schools through the Excellence by Design protocols.

== History ==
The Warren Hills Regional School District first operated its schools in the 1967–68 school year. The current Warren Hills Regional High School opened its doors in September 1967 as Warren Hills Regional Senior High School, and relieved overcrowding conditions at Washington High School (now Warren Hills Regional Middle School) while simultaneously providing upgraded and modern facilities for the district's high school students in Grades 10-12. The former Washington High School, constructed in 1931, became Warren Hills Regional Junior High School and served the district's students in Grades 7-9. In 1989, an addition at Warren Hills Regional Senior High School was completed, allowing the 9th grade to move from the junior high school to the high school. With that the high school was given its present name of Warren Hills Regional High School, and the junior high school was given its current name of Warren Hills Regional Middle School.

The district had been classified by the New Jersey Department of Education as being in District Factor Group "FG", the fourth-highest of eight groupings. District Factor Groups organize districts statewide to allow comparison by common socioeconomic characteristics of the local districts. From lowest socioeconomic status to highest, the categories are A, B, CD, DE, FG, GH, I and J.

== Schools ==
Schools in the district (with 2023–24 enrollment data from the National Center for Education Statistics) are:

- Warren Hills Regional Middle School with 480 students in grades 7–8 (located in Washington Borough)
  - Nicholas Remondelli, principal
- Warren Hills Regional High School with 1,066 students in grades 9–12 (located in Washington Township)
  - Chris Kavcak, principal

== Administration ==
The district-wide administration consists of:

- Earl C. Clymer III, superintendent
- Donnamarie Palmiere, business administrator and board secretary

== Board of education ==
The district's board of education, comprised of nine members, sets policy and oversees the fiscal and educational operation of the district through its administration. As a Type II school district, the board's trustees are elected directly by voters to serve three-year terms of office on a staggered basis, with three seats up for election each year held (since 2012) as part of the November general election. The board appoints a superintendent to oversee the district's day-to-day operations and a business administrator to supervise the business functions of the district. Seats on the board are allocated to the constituent municipalities based on population, with three seats each allocated to Mansfield Township and Washington Township, two to Washington Borough and one seat assigned to Franklin Township. Oxford Township does not have representation on the board since it sends its students as part of a sending/receiving relationship.
