= Franklin Township, Warren County, New Jersey =

Township in Warren County, New Jersey, US

Franklin Township, New Jersey
- Township
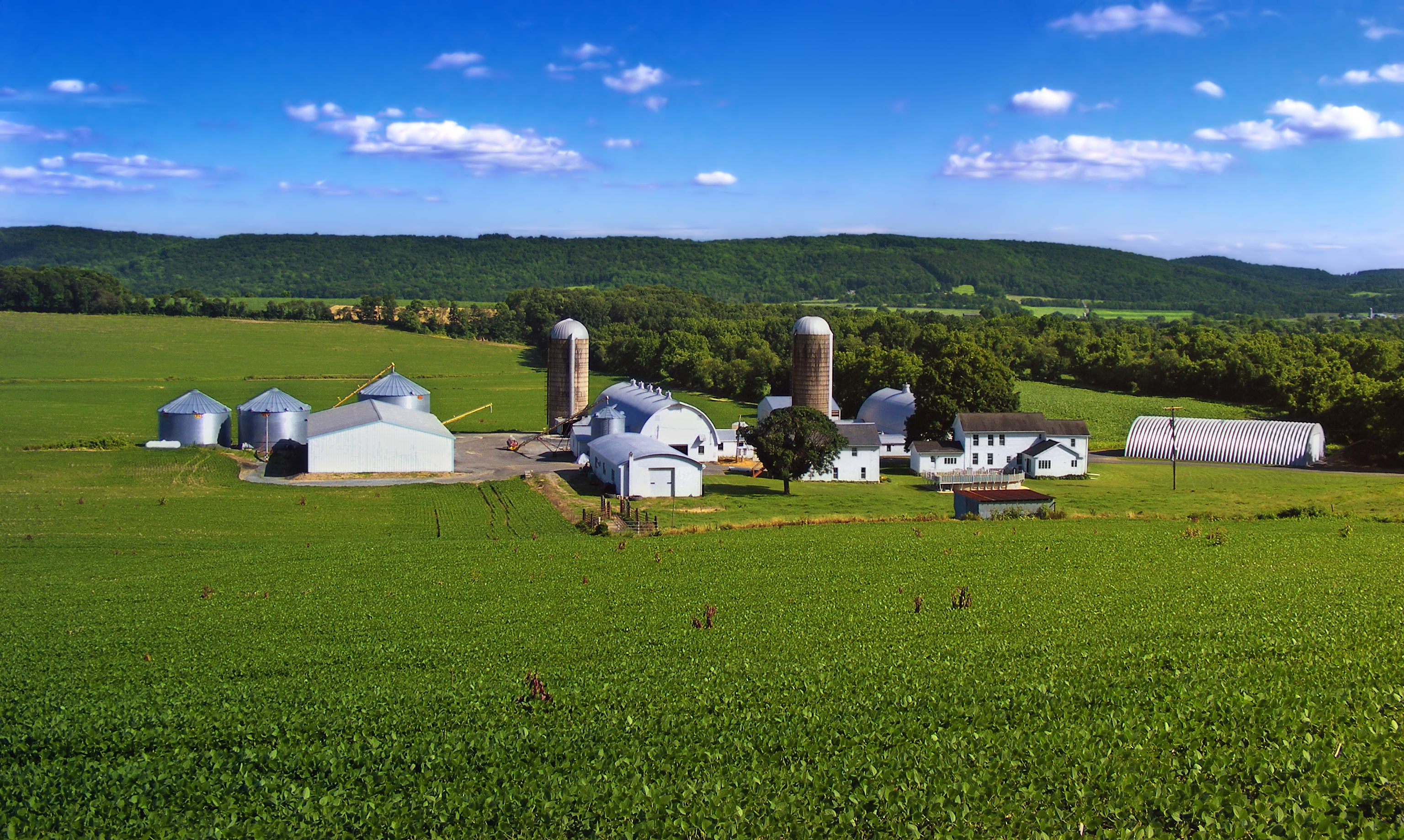
- A Franklin Township farm in 2009

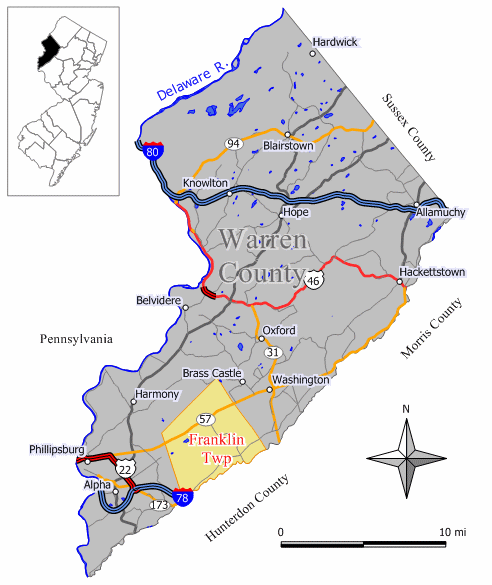
- Location of Franklin Township in Warren County highlighted in yellow (right). Inset map: Location of Warren County in New Jersey highlighted in black (left).

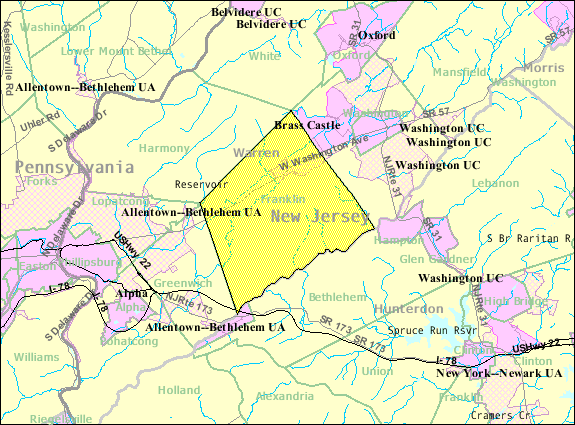
- Census Bureau map of Franklin Township, Warren County, New Jersey

- Location in Warren County Location in New Jersey Location in the United States
- Coordinates: 40.712407°N 75.052831°W
- Country: United States
- State: New Jersey
- County: Warren
- Incorporated: April 8, 1839
- Named for: Benjamin Franklin

Government
  - Type: Township
  - Body: Township Committee
  - Mayor: Sarah Payne (R, term ends December 31, 2026)
  - Municipal clerk: Denise L. Becton

Area
  - Total: 23.51 sq mi (60.89 km^{2})
  - Land: 23.42 sq mi (60.66 km^{2})
  - Water: 0.089 sq mi (0.23 km^{2}) 0.38%
  - Rank: 118th of 565 in state 8th of 22 in county
- Elevation: 509 ft (155 m)

Population (2020)
  - Total: 2,968
  - Estimate (2023): 3,000
  - Rank: 450th of 565 in state 13th of 22 in county
  - Density: 126.7/sq mi (48.9/km^{2})
  - Rank: 530th of 565 in state 17th of 22 in county
- Time zone: UTC−05:00 (Eastern (EST))
  - Summer (DST): UTC−04:00 (Eastern (EDT))
- ZIP Code: 08808 – Broadway
- Area code: 908 exchanges: 689, 835
- FIPS code: 3404124960
- GNIS feature ID: 0882251
- Website: www.franklintwpwarren.org

Franklin Township is a township in Warren County, in the U.S. state of New Jersey. As of the 2020 United States census, the township's population was 2,968, a decrease of 208 (−6.5%) from the 2010 census count of 3,176, which in turn reflected an increase of 408 (+14.7%) from the 2,768 counted in the 2000 census.

Franklin was incorporated as a township by the New Jersey Legislature on April 8, 1839, from portions of Greenwich Township, Mansfield Township, and Oxford Township. The township is named for Benjamin Franklin.

== Geography ==
According to the U.S. Census Bureau, the township had a total area of 23.51 square miles (60.89 km^{2}), including 23.42 square miles (60.66 km^{2}) of land and 0.09 square miles (0.23 km^{2}) of water (0.38%).

Asbury (with a 2020 Census population of 270), Broadway (213) and New Village (399) are unincorporated communities and census-designated places (CDPs) located within the township.

Other unincorporated communities, localities and place names located partially or completely within the township include Willow Grove.

Franklin Township borders the municipalities of Greenwich Township, Harmony Township and Washington Township in Warren County; and Bethlehem Township and Bloomsbury in Hunterdon County.

== Demographics ==
Historical population
Census	Pop.	Note	%±
1840	1,348		—
1850	1,565		16.1%
1860	1,902		21.5%
1870	1,655		−13.0%
1880	1,529		−7.6%
1890	1,283		−16.1%
1900	1,280		−0.2%
1910	1,585		23.8%
1920	1,457		−8.1%
1930	1,213		−16.7%
1940	1,540		27.0%
1950	1,530		−0.6%
1960	1,729		13.0%
1970	1,973		14.1%
1980	2,341		18.7%
1990	2,404		2.7%
2000	2,768		15.1%
2010	3,176		14.7%
2020	2,968		−6.5%
2023 (est.)	3,000		1.1%
Population sources: 1840–1920 1840 1850–1870; 1850 1870 1880–1890; 1890–1910 1910–1930; 1940–2000 2000; 2010 2020

The township's economic data (as is all of Warren County) is calculated by the U.S. Census Bureau as part of the Allentown-Bethlehem-Easton, PA-NJ Metropolitan Statistical Area.

=== 2010 census ===
The 2010 United States census counted 3,176 people, 1,122 households, and 885 families in the township. The population density was 132.1 per square mile (51.0/km^{2}). There were 1,219 housing units at an average density of 50.7 per square mile (19.6/km^{2}). The racial makeup was 94.43% (2,999) White, 1.48% (47) Black or African American, 0.13% (4) Native American, 2.33% (74) Asian, 0.00% (0) Pacific Islander, 0.19% (6) from other races, and 1.45% (46) from two or more races. Hispanic or Latino of any race were 3.84% (122) of the population.

Of the 1,122 households, 35.1% had children under the age of 18; 70.4% were married couples living together; 5.4% had a female householder with no husband present and 21.1% were non-families. Of all households, 16.9% were made up of individuals and 6.7% had someone living alone who was 65 years of age or older. The average household size was 2.82 and the average family size was 3.21.

24.9% of the population were under the age of 18, 7.4% from 18 to 24, 20.0% from 25 to 44, 35.6% from 45 to 64, and 12.2% who were 65 years of age or older. The median age was 43.6 years. For every 100 females, the population had 101.9 males. For every 100 females ages 18 and older there were 100.6 males. The Census Bureau's 2006–2010 American Community Survey showed that (in 2010 inflation-adjusted dollars) median household income was $85,893 (with a margin of error of +/− $7,764) and the median family income was $98,333 (+/− $7,142). Males had a median income of $69,784 (+/− $9,633) versus $59,750 (+/− $16,881) for females. The per capita income for the borough was $38,178 (+/− $4,746). About 7.2% of families and 5.2% of the population were below the poverty line, including 4.6% of those under age 18 and 9.2% of those age 65 or over.

=== 2000 census ===
As of the 2000 U.S. census, there were 2,768 people, 972 households, and 750 families residing in the township. The population density was 115.4 inhabitants per square mile (44.6/km^{2}). There were 1,019 housing units at an average density of 42.5 per square mile (16.4/km^{2}). The racial makeup of the township was 97.04% White, 0.83% African American, 0.07% Native American, 0.87% Asian, 0.11% from other races, and 1.08% from two or more races. Hispanic or Latino of any race were 1.99% of the population.

There were 972 households, out of which 39.8% had children under the age of 18 living with them, 66.6% were married couples living together, 7.3% had a female householder with no husband present, and 22.8% were non-families. 18.6% of all households were made up of individuals, and 7.6% had someone living alone who was 65 years of age or older. The average household size was 2.84 and the average family size was 3.28.

In the township, the population was spread out, with 28.8% under the age of 18, 5.1% from 18 to 24, 30.7% from 25 to 44, 25.3% from 45 to 64, and 10.2% who were 65 years of age or older. The median age was 38 years. For every 100 females, there were 102.8 males. For every 100 females age 18 and over, there were 99.4 males.

The median income for a household in the township was $69,115, and the median income for a family was $72,763. Males had a median income of $47,569 versus $31,906 for females. The per capita income for the township was $27,224. About 2.4% of families and 3.1% of the population were below the poverty line, including 1.9% of those under age 18 and 15.3% of those age 65 or over.

== Economy ==
The Edison Portland Cement Company, a venture of Thomas Edison, was founded in 1899 in the New Village section of the township. the company went on to supply the concrete for the construction of Yankee Stadium in 1922. The company went bankrupt in the 1920s.

== Government ==
=== Local government ===
Franklin Township is governed under the Township form of New Jersey municipal government, one of 141 municipalities (of the 564) statewide that use this form, the second-most commonly used form of government in the state. The Township Committee is comprised of five members, who are elected directly by the voters at-large in partisan elections to serve three-year terms of office on a staggered basis, with either one or two seats coming up for election each year as part of the November general election in a three-year cycle. At an annual reorganization meeting, the Township Committee selects one of its members to serve as Mayor and another to serve as Deputy Mayor.

As of 2026, members of the Franklin Township Committee are Mayor Sarah Payne (R, term on committee ends December 31, 2028; term as mayor ends 2026), Deputy Mayor Bonnie Butler (R, term on committee ends and as deputy mayor ends 2026), David Guth (R, 2027), Richard Herzer (R, 2028) and Michael Toretta (R, 2027).

In 2018, the township had an average property tax bill of $9,022, the highest in the county, compared to an average bill of $8,767 statewide.

=== Federal, state, and county representation ===
Franklin Township is located in the 7th Congressional District and is part of New Jersey's 23rd state legislative district. Prior to the 2010 Census, Franklin Township had been part of the 5th Congressional District, a change made by the New Jersey Redistricting Commission that took effect in January 2013, based on the results of the November 2012 general elections.

For the 119th United States Congress, New Jersey's 7th congressional district is represented by Thomas Kean Jr. (R, Westfield). New Jersey is represented in the United States Senate by Democrats Cory Booker (Newark, term ends 2027) and Andy Kim (Moorestown, term ends 2031).

For the 2026–2027 session, the 23rd legislative district of the New Jersey Legislature is represented in the State Senate by Doug Steinhardt (R, Lopatcong Township) and in the General Assembly by John DiMaio (R, Hackettstown) and Erik Peterson (R, Franklin Township).

Warren County is governed by a three-member Board of County Commissioners, who are chosen at-large on a staggered basis in partisan elections with one seat coming up for election each year as part of the November general election. At an annual reorganization meeting held in the beginning of January, the board selects one of its members to serve as Commissioner Director and other as Deputy Director. As of 2025, Warren County's Commissioners are:

Deputy Director Jason J. Sarnoski (R, Lopatcong Township; 2025), Lori Ciesla (R, Lopatcong Township; 2026), and Director James R. Kern III (R, Pohatcong Township; 2027).

Constitutional officers of Warren County are: Clerk Holly Mackey (R, Alpha; 2027), Sheriff James McDonald Sr. (R, Phillipsburg; 2025) and Surrogate Michael J. Doherty (R, Washington; 2025).

=== Politics ===
As of March 2011, there were a total of 2,112 registered voters in Franklin Township, of which 396 (18.8% vs. 21.5% countywide) were registered as Democrats, 890 (42.1% vs. 35.3%) were registered as Republicans and 825 (39.1% vs. 43.1%) were registered as Unaffiliated. There was one voter registered to another party. Among the township's 2010 Census population, 66.5% (vs. 62.3% in Warren County) were registered to vote, including 88.6% of those ages 18 and over (vs. 81.5% countywide).

Gubernatorial election results for Franklin Township
Year	Republican		Democratic		Third party(ies)	
Year	No.	%	No.	%	No.	%
2025	930	64.85%	495	34.52%	9	0.63%
2021	855	72.21%	316	26.69%	13	1.10%
2017	689	71.70%	247	25.70%	25	2.60%
2013	730	79.61%	167	18.21%	20	2.18%
2009	794	69.89%	200	17.61%	142	12.50%
2005	646	62.00%	320	30.71%	76	7.29%

In the 2012 presidential election, Republican Mitt Romney received 921 votes (63.1% vs. 56.0% countywide), ahead of Democrat Barack Obama with 493 votes (33.8% vs. 40.8%) and other candidates with 27 votes (1.8% vs. 1.7%), among the 1,460 ballots cast by the township's 2,095 registered voters, for a turnout of 69.7% (vs. 66.7% in Warren County). In the 2008 presidential election, Republican John McCain received 960 votes (59.9% vs. 55.2% countywide), ahead of Democrat Barack Obama with 588 votes (36.7% vs. 41.4%) and other candidates with 39 votes (2.4% vs. 1.6%), among the 1,602 ballots cast by the township's 2,090 registered voters, for a turnout of 76.7% (vs. 73.4% in Warren County). In the 2004 presidential election, Republican George W. Bush received 967 votes (63.1% vs. 61.0% countywide), ahead of Democrat John Kerry with 529 votes (34.5% vs. 37.2%) and other candidates with 26 votes (1.7% vs. 1.3%), among the 1,533 ballots cast by the township's 1,900 registered voters, for a turnout of 80.7% (vs. 76.3% in the whole county).

United States presidential election results for Franklin Township
Year	Republican		Democratic		Third party(ies)	
Year	No.	%	No.	%	No.	%
2024	1,215	65.89%	593	32.16%	36	1.95%
2020	1,159	63.44%	626	34.26%	42	2.30%
2016	1,037	66.73%	450	28.96%	67	4.31%
2012	921	63.91%	493	34.21%	27	1.87%
2008	960	60.49%	588	37.05%	39	2.46%
2004	967	63.53%	529	34.76%	26	1.71%

In the 2013 gubernatorial election, Republican Chris Christie received 79.6% of the vote (730 cast), ahead of Democrat Barbara Buono with 18.2% (167 votes), and other candidates with 2.2% (20 votes), among the 932 ballots cast by the township's 2,148 registered voters (15 ballots were spoiled), for a turnout of 43.4%. In the 2009 gubernatorial election, Republican Chris Christie received 794 votes (68.8% vs. 61.3% countywide), ahead of Democrat Jon Corzine with 200 votes (17.3% vs. 25.7%), Independent Chris Daggett with 117 votes (10.1% vs. 9.8%) and other candidates with 25 votes (2.2% vs. 1.5%), among the 1,154 ballots cast by the township's 2,059 registered voters, yielding a 56.0% turnout (vs. 49.6% in the county).

United States Senate election results for Franklin Township1
Year	Republican		Democratic		Third party(ies)	
Year	No.	%	No.	%	No.	%
2024	1,172	65.73%	571	32.02%	40	2.24%
2018	882	69.89%	332	26.31%	48	3.80%
2012	887	64.74%	458	33.43%	25	1.82%
2006	575	59.83%	330	34.34%	56	5.83%

United States Senate election results for Franklin Township2
Year	Republican		Democratic		Third party(ies)	
Year	No.	%	No.	%	No.	%
2020	1,158	64.95%	576	32.31%	49	2.75%
2014	472	64.04%	217	29.44%	48	6.51%
2013	413	72.58%	151	26.54%	5	0.88%
2008	975	65.35%	477	31.97%	40	2.68%

== Education ==
The Franklin Township School District serves public school students in pre-kindergarten through sixth grade. As of the 2022–23 school year, the district, comprised of one school, had an enrollment of 197 students and 25.0 classroom teachers (on an FTE basis), for a student–teacher ratio of 7.9:1.

Public school students in seventh through twelfth grades attend the schools of the Warren Hills Regional School District, which also serves students from the municipalities of Mansfield Township, Washington Borough, Washington Township and Oxford Township (for 9-12 only, attending on a tuition basis). Schools in the district (with 2022–23 enrollment data from the National Center for Education Statistics) are Warren Hills Regional Middle School with 468 students in grades 7 and 8 (located in Washington Borough) and Warren Hills Regional High School with 1,068 students in grades 9 - 12 (located in Washington Township). The high school district is overseen by a nine-member board of education; seats are allocated to the constituent municipalities based on population, with one seat assigned to Franklin Township.

Students from the township and from all of Warren County are eligible to attend Ridge and Valley Charter School in Frelinghuysen Township (for grades K–8) or Warren County Technical School in Washington borough (for 9–12), with special education services provided by local districts supplemented throughout the county by the Warren County Special Services School District in Oxford Township (for PreK–12).

== Transportation ==
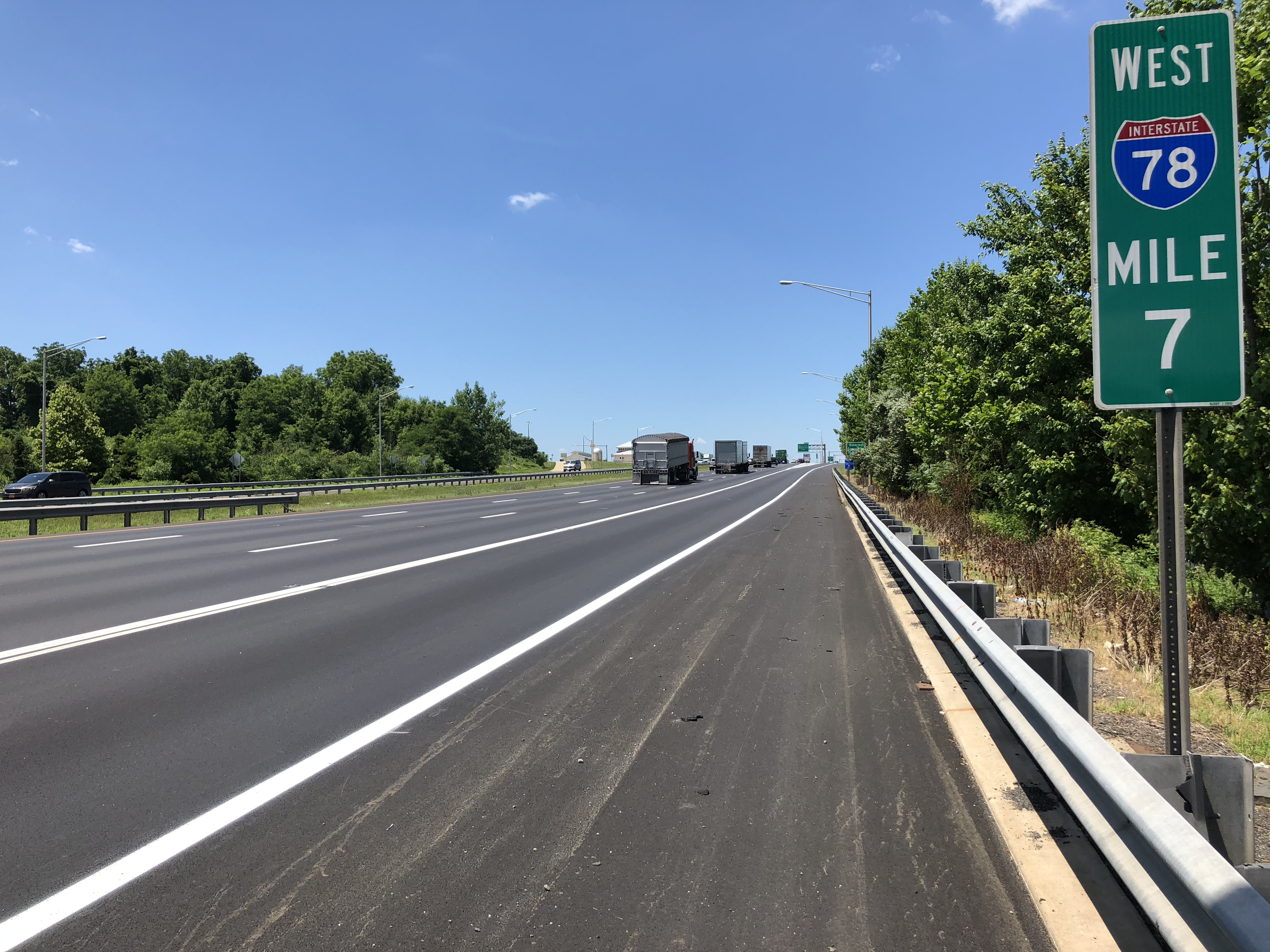
A westward view of Interstate 78/US Route 22 in Franklin Township

As of May 2010, the township had a total of 52.92 miles (85.17 km) of roadways, of which 36.93 miles (59.43 km) were maintained by the municipality, 11.05 miles (17.78 km) by Warren County and 4.94 miles (7.95 km) by the New Jersey Department of Transportation.

Major roadways in Franklin Township include Interstate 78/U.S. Route 22, which pass through the southern part very briefly with Exit 6 right on the border. Route 57 runs through the northern part of the township.

== Notable people ==
People who were born in, residents of, or otherwise closely associated with Franklin Township include:

- Dom Fucci (1928–1987), professional football player for the Detroit Lions
- Billy Osmun (born 1943), retired dirt modified racing driver
- Pete Perini (1928–2008), former professional football player who played in the NFL for the Chicago Bears and Cleveland Browns
- Buzzie Reutimann (born 1941), former NASCAR driver
- David Reutimann (born 1970), professional stock car racing crew chief and former driver
