= Dom Fucci =

American football player (1928–1987)

No. 48
- Position: Defensive back

Personal information
- Born: September 14, 1928; New Village in Franklin Township, Warren County, New Jersey, U.S.
- Died: June 22, 1987 (aged 58); Lexington, Kentucky, U.S.
- Listed height: 5 ft 11 in (1.80 m)
- Listed weight: 190 lb (86 kg)

Career information
- College: Kentucky (1947–1950)
- NFL draft: 1951: 18th round, 210th overall pick

Career history

Playing
- Detroit Lions (1955)

Coaching
- Louisville Raiders (1961) Head coach

Career NFL statistics
- Punts: 2
- Punt yards: 72
- Longest punt: 55
- Stats at Pro Football Reference

Dominic A. Fucci (/ˈfʌsiː/ FUS-ee; September 15, 1928 – June 22, 1987) was an American professional football defensive back in the National Football League (NFL) for the Detroit Lions.

Fucci was born in New Jersey. He played college football at the University of Kentucky and was drafted in the eighteenth round of the 1951 NFL draft by the Washington Redskins. He was manager of the football team at Bolling Air Force Base during the 1950s, on staff at a University of Kentucky coaching clinic in 1957, and head coach of the Louisville Raiders in 1961.

Fucci married Betty Papania and had two sons who were both athletes. Fucci died in 1987, in Lexington, Kentucky, at age 58.
