= Warren Hills Regional High School =

High school in Warren County, New Jersey, US

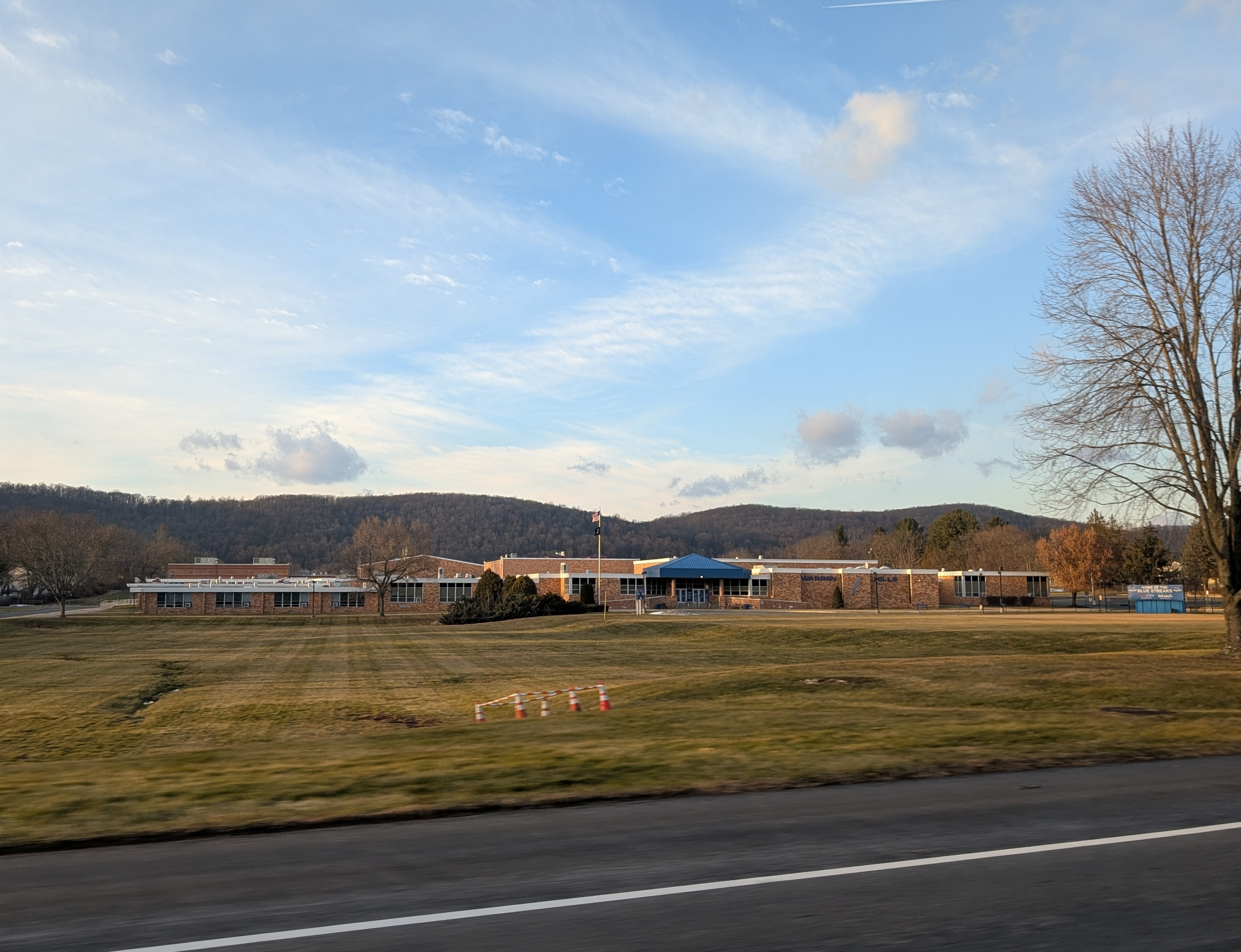

Location
- 41 Jackson Valley Road; Washington, Warren County, New Jersey, New Jersey 07882; United States; 40.771889°N 74.983459°W

Information
- Type: Public high school
- Established: September 1967; 58 years ago
- School district: Warren Hills Regional School District
- NCES School ID: 341697005878
- Principal: Chris Kavcak
- Faculty: 97.6 FTEs
- Grades: 9-12
- Enrollment: 1,066 (as of 2023–24)
- Student to teacher ratio: 10.9:1
- Campus type: Town: Fringe
- Colors: Royal blue white and black
- Athletics conference: Skyland Conference (general); Big Central Football Conference (football)
- Team name: Blue Streaks
- Rivals: Hackettstown High School; Phillipsburg High School
- Accreditation: Middle States Association of Colleges and Schools
- Newspaper: The Streak
- Website: hs.warrenhills.org

Warren Hills Regional High School is a four-year public high school located in Washington Township in Warren County, in the U.S. state of New Jersey, operating as part of the Warren Hills Regional School District. The school offers a comprehensive education for students in ninth through twelfth grades. The student population includes students from Franklin Township, Mansfield Township, Washington Borough and Washington Township, with students from Oxford Township attending on a tuition basis. The school has been accredited by the Middle States Association of Colleges and Schools Commission on Elementary and Secondary Schools since 2014.

As of the 2023–24 school year, the school had an enrollment of 1,066 students and 97.6 classroom teachers (on an FTE basis), for a student–teacher ratio of 10.9:1. There were 103 students (9.7% of enrollment) eligible for free lunch and 33 (3.1% of students) eligible for reduced-cost lunch.

== History ==
The present high school building located on Jackson Valley Road in Washington Township opened in September 1967. Before the opening of the school, students had attended Washington High School, which was repurposed as the new district's junior high school. An expansion of the high school building was completed in 1992, which included a new library and gym to accommodate the addition of students in ninth grade. A second expansion at the high school during the first decade of the 21st century added more classrooms, office space, gym/weight rooms, and conversion of the original gym to a new library to meet growing enrollment in the district. Recently, the district added an all-purpose athletic field, tennis courts, and practice field on an acquired tract of land on Jackson Valley Road.

== Student publications ==
The school has two newspapers and a Literary Magazine or "litmag" The official school paper The Streak has been publishing for 26 consecutive years and is published four times a year. The Renegade debuted in mid-June 2014 and is entirely run by students.

== Awards, recognition and rankings ==
The school was the 172nd-ranked public high school in New Jersey out of 339 schools statewide in New Jersey Monthly magazine's September 2014 cover story on the state's "Top Public High Schools", using a new ranking methodology. The school had been ranked 168th in the state of 328 schools in 2012, after being ranked 202nd in 2010 out of 322 schools listed. The magazine ranked the school 179th in the magazine's September 2008 issue, which surveyed 316 schools across the state. Schooldigger.com ranked the school tied for 173rd out of 381 public high schools statewide in its 2011 rankings (an increase of 54 positions from the 2010 ranking) which were based on the combined percentage of students classified as proficient or above proficient on the mathematics (79.6%) and language arts literacy (94.2%) components of the High School Proficiency Assessment (HSPA).

== Performing Arts ==
Warren Hills Regional High School offers a comprehensive performing arts program encompassing instrumental music (marching band, concert and jazz ensembles), vocal music (multiple choirs), and theater (fall plays and spring musicals with pit orchestra).

=== Blue Streak Marching Band ===
The Blue Streak Marching Band performs at all varsity football games (pre-games and halftime) and in local parades (e.g. the annual Fourth of July “Washington Celebrates America” parade). Band members rehearse intensively in late summer (band camp) and through the football season, and compete in the USBands circuit. Post-COVID-19, the ensemble has attained numerous recognitions.

The 2025 ensemble won the USBands Group IIAA New Jersey state championship – the first state title in school history – with a school record score of 92.00 and caption awards for Best Music and Best Percussion. The band won first place as Ludwig-Musser Classic (MetLife Stadium) Champions with a score of 87.20 and earning Best Music and Best Percussion.

=== Drama club and musical theater ===
The Drama Club stages two major productions each year: a fall play and a spring musical. They participate in the FREDDY Awards, a regional awards show recognizing high school musicals. The pit orchestra (below) accompanies these shows, and the school’s auditorium serves as the performance venue. In 2025, their performance run of Newsies was awarded a school record 10 FREDDY nominations, winning three (Outstanding Small Ensemble Performance, Outstanding Use of Choreography and Musical Staging, and Outstanding Ensemble). In 2026, they received five nominations for their rendition of Big Fish: School Edition, winning Outstanding Small Ensemble Performance.

=== Pit orchestra ===
Each spring musical features a live Pit Orchestra, comprising students on strings, winds, brass, keyboards and percussion. For the past four years in a row, they have been nominated for Outstanding Performance by an Orchestra at the FREDDY Awards.

=== Honors Wind Ensemble and Concert Band ===
These two groups are the school’s core instrumental ensembles. Honors Wind Ensemble is open to all wind, brass and percussion students by audition or placement. Spring and Fall concerts showcase marches, overtures, and contemporary band literature. The groups perform various concerts throughout the school year. They also compete annually at Music in the Parks at Hershey Park where they consistently receive ratings of Superior.

=== Choirs ===
The choral program includes several ensembles including Concert Choir, Honors Advanced Concert Choir, Select Choir, Rock and Pop, and a new Chamber Choir. The Concert Choir and Honors Advanced Concert Choir are both offered as classes during the school day, while Select Choir, Rock and Pop, and Chamber Choir are competitive, audition-based after-school clubs. All choirs perform at seasonal concerts, community events, and competitions. The combined Concert Choirs and Select Choir both perform annually at Music in the Parks at Hershey Park and consistently receive ratings of Superior.

=== Blue Streak Jazz Ensemble ===
The Blue Streak Jazz Ensemble is the school’s jazz band and membership is by audition from among band students. The jazz band performs at school concerts and jazz festivals/competitions. They have competed at the annual SteelStacks High School Jazz Band Showcase where they consistently receive ratings of Excellent. The band has also competed in regional jazz contests (e.g. Lenape Valley Jazz Festival) and earned superior ratings and students have received numerous solo awards.

== Controversy ==
A court case in 2002 was filed by a student for wearing a shirt the school deemed inappropriate. The student was suspended after refusing to turn his shirt inside out. The student eventually filed a case that led to a decision by the United States Court of Appeals for the Third Circuit.

On June 21, 2013, during the graduation ceremony for the class of 2013, a former student streaked across the field. The former student managed to outrun both a police officer and man dressed in military uniform. He was later caught 100 yards (91 m) into the woods behind the stadium and arrested.

== Athletics ==
Logo of the WH Blue Streaks

The Warren Hills High School Blue Streaks compete in the Skyland Conference which is comprised of public and private high schools in Hunterdon, Somerset and Warren counties, and operates under the supervision of the New Jersey State Interscholastic Athletic Association (NJSIAA). The Blue Streaks nickname dates back to at least 1932. With 901 students in grades 10–12, the school was classified by the NJSIAA for the 2019–20 school year as Group III for most athletic competition purposes, which included schools with an enrollment of 761 to 1,058 students in that grade range. The football team competes in Division 3 of the Big Central Football Conference, which includes 60 public and private high schools in Hunterdon, Middlesex, Somerset, Union and Warren counties, which are broken down into 10 divisions by size and location. The school was classified by the NJSIAA as Group III North for football for 2024–2026, which included schools with 700 to 884 students. The school's traditional rival is Hackettstown High School, formerly of the Skyland Conference and now Northwest Jersey Athletic Conference, and the wrestling/football rival is Phillipsburg High School.

=== Wrestling ===
The Warren Hills wrestling program was started in 1936 by Frank Bennett, a member of the National Wrestling Hall of Fame and Museum who also started the program at Fair Lawn High School in Fair Lawn, New Jersey. Warren Hills wrestling ranks third all-time in the number of individual state champions crowned, with 36 through 2024. The program has produced such notables as Dan Slack, who beat future Olympian Bruce Baumgartner on the way to the state heavyweight crown in 1977, and Ben Oberly who was a two-time state champion (and placed 3rd his sophomore year) and ranked first at his weight in the nation in 1986. The 1990 state championship team went undefeated and is one of only a handful of teams in the state to have ever beaten rival Phillipsburg High School twice in one year.

Warren Hills holds one of the state's oldest wrestling tournaments, the John Goles Tournament, which honors one of the school's greatest coaches, and includes several wrestling programs from New Jersey and Pennsylvania. At the conclusion of the winter break tournament, there is a tourney champion and outstanding wrestler trophy presentation. Every year the wrestling team honors the record holders from previous events.

The boys' wrestling team won the North II Group III state sectional championship in 1982, 1990, 1997, 1998, 2007, 2022 and 2023; the team won the Group III state championship in both 1990 and 1997, and were Group III runner ups in both 2022 and 2023. The team won the 2007 North II, Group III state sectional championship with a 33–29 victory against Scotch Plains-Fanwood High School.

=== Football ===
The football program is a member of the Big Central Football Conference, which was created through a merger of the Mid-State 38 Football Conference and the Greater Middlesex Conference, and comprises 61 schools from Hunterdon, Middlesex, Somerset, Union and Warren counties.

The 2000 football team (11–1) won the North II Group III state sectional title, with a 21–14 win against West Morris Central High School.

The program was awarded the 1973 NJSIAA Central Group title and the undefeated 1945 team was recognized with the North Group I title.

The program had an annual Thanksgiving game with rival Hackettstown until the 1940s. Flemington (now Hunterdon Central Regional High School) became the Thanksgiving rival until that school switched to challenge North Hunterdon High School in the late 1960s. From late 1960s until the game ended in the mid-1980s, the annual Thanksgiving opponent was Belvidere High School in Belvidere.

=== Field hockey ===
Since 1970, the field hockey program has won over 500 matches, and they have taken home numerous conference titles and several district titles. The girls field hockey team won the North II Group III state sectional title in 1984, 1996, 1997, 1999–2003, 2009 and 2012-2014 and won the North I Group III state sectional championship in 2015–2019. The team won the Group III championship in 2014 (defeating runner-up Ocean City High School in the final game of the tournament) and in 2015 (vs. Ocean City).

Between 2000 and 2014, the team had a record of 264-71-12 under coach Laurie Kerr, winning nine sectional titles. In 2014, after nine unsuccessful title-game appearances, the team won the program's first Group III state championship with a 5–4 win in overtime against Ocean City High School, a team that had beaten them six previous times in the championship game. The 2015 team repeated as Group III champion with a 1–0 win in the championship game, defeating Ocean City for the second year in a row.

=== Other sports ===
The girls' bowling team won the Group III state title in 2017 and 2018. In 2017, the team won the Tournament of Champions, the first team from the northern part of the state to take the overall title.

In 2013, the school's varsity cheerleading team won the 2013 Skyland Conference, overall and Raritan. The cheerleading team won the NJCDCA Group III state championship title in 2017.

In 2016, the boys' basketball team won the North II Group III sectional championship. They came back from a 10–0 deficit at the start of the game and defeated the 19th-ranked team in the state Chatham High School by a final score of 52–46 to earn the program's first ever sectional championship.

== Administration ==
The school's principal is Chris Kavcak. His administration team includes two assistant principals.

== Notable alumni ==
Alumni of Warren Hills Regional High School and its predecessor, Washington High School, include:

- Halsey (born 1994 as Ashley Nicolette Frangipane, class of 2012), singer-songwriter
- Pete Perini (1928–2008, class of 1946), fullback who played in the NFL with the Chicago Bears and Cleveland Browns
- Anthony Veneziano (born 1997, class of 2016), professional baseball player
