= Rockport train wreck =

1925 railway accident

Coordinates: 40°49′18″N 74°52′27″W

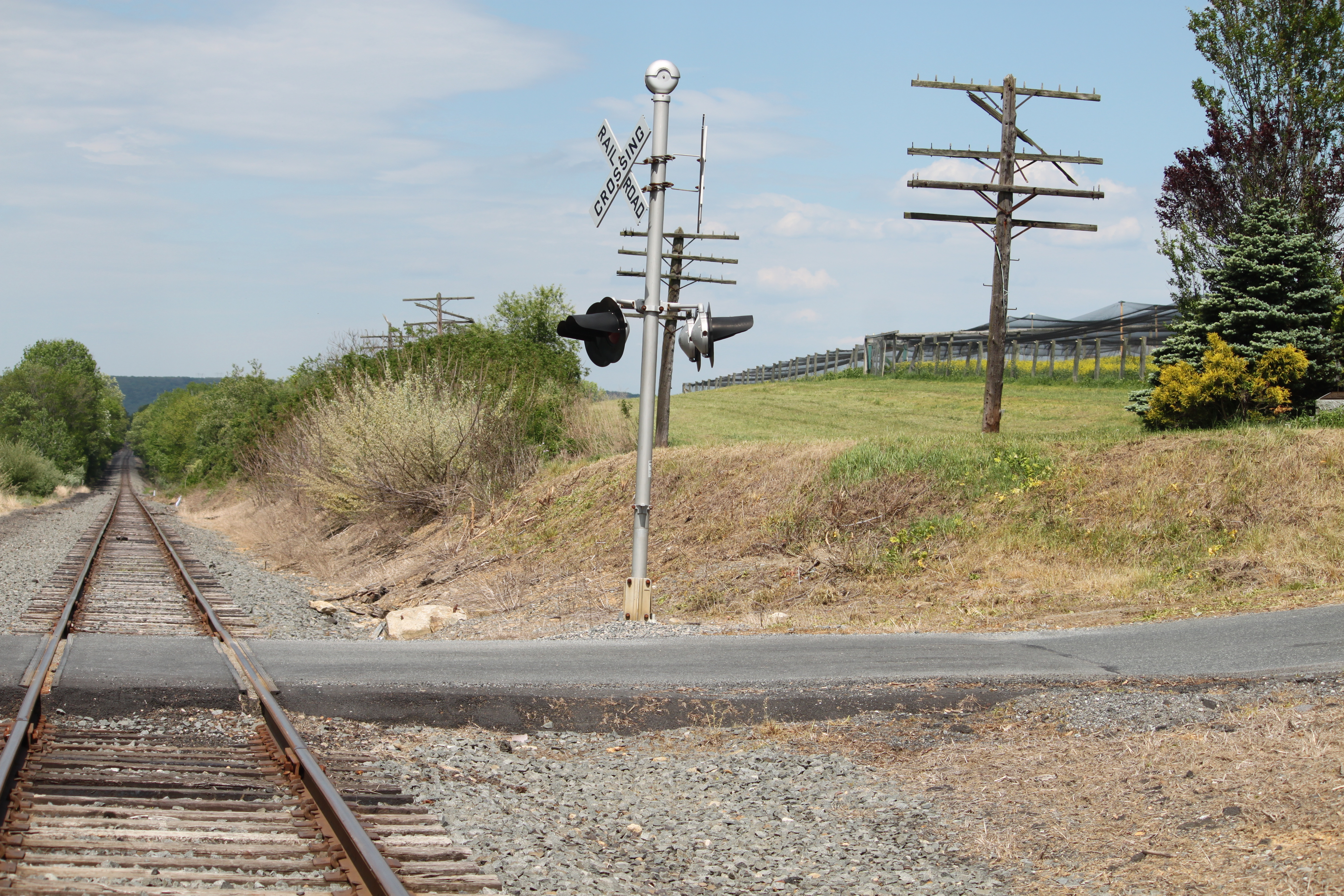
- 2012 photo of Hazen Road grade crossing and the wreck site

Details
- Date: June 16, 1925; 101 years ago 2:24 am
- Location: Rockport, Mansfield Township, New Jersey
- Country: United States
- Line: Lackawanna Old Road
- Operator: Lackawanna Railroad (DL&W)
- Incident type: Derailment
- Cause: Debris on grade crossing

Statistics
- Trains: 1
- Passengers: 182
- Deaths: 47 (est.)
- Injured: 23 (est.)

The Rockport train wreck occurred in Rockport in Mansfield Township, New Jersey, United States, about three miles outside of Hackettstown, on June 16, 1925. After a violent storm washed debris onto a grade crossing, a Lackawanna Railroad (DL&W) train derailed and crashed, killing 42 passengers and five crewmen and injuring 23 others.

== Train ==
The train, a non-scheduled special train of the Delaware, Lackawanna and Western Railroad (DL&W), was carrying 182 German-Americans from Chicago, Illinois, to Hoboken, New Jersey. At Hoboken, the passengers were to board the United States Lines steamer Republic and sail to Bremen, Germany. The trip was an annual excursion organized through steamship agent Leopold Neumann to allow midwestern Germans to visit their homeland. The trip's itinerary included visits to Bremen, Cologne, and Munich in Germany and Vienna in Austria.

The train left Chicago at 6 p.m. on June 14, 1925, consisting of a locomotive, five Pullman cars, and two passenger coaches. In the afternoon, the train stopped so that the passengers could visit Niagara Falls. Towards dinnertime, the passengers reboarded the train at Buffalo for the 400-mile (640 km) trip to Hoboken. The train passed through Binghamton, New York, about 10:30 p.m. and then made a stop at Scranton, Pennsylvania, just before midnight for a crew and engine change. At 12:01 a.m. on June 16, engineer Fred Loomis took over the controls of Lackawanna Engine No. 1104 and the train set off on the last leg of the trip through the Pocono Mountains, crossing the Delaware River near the Delaware Water Gap, and then east into New Jersey.

The train had been scheduled to travel via the Lackawanna Cut-Off, but because of freight traffic on the line the towerman at Slateford Junction rerouted the special over the Old Road of the Lackawanna, an alternate route that was to take the train through the New Jersey towns of Washington, and Hackettstown, before rejoining the main line near Lake Hopatcong. The rerouting of these types of trains on this section of the railroad under these circumstances was not unusual.

== Wreck ==
On the evening of June 15, and into the next morning, violent thunderstorms hit the Hackettstown area. Around 10 p.m., lightning struck Williams and Hibler's lumber yard in Hackettstown, starting a fire that would eventually consume the yard despite the efforts of the townspeople. Shortly after midnight, rain from another thunderstorm sent water cascading down Hazen Road and onto Rockport Crossing, where the road crossed the Lackawanna's Phillipsburg Branch. The water washed dirt and gravel down a steep hill and onto the crossing, where this debris accumulated in the flangeways, metal pieces installed to allow trains to pass smoothly through the crossing.

About 3:25 a.m., with most passengers asleep, the locomotive reached the Hazen Road grade crossing. The lead pair of engine-truck wheels hit the clogged flangeways at the crossing and derailed the trucks to the right. With the left truck wheels running just inside the rails, and the right truck wheels just outside the rails, the engine continued down the track for another 198 feet (60 m) until the left front truck wheel hit a crossover frog from a trailing switch (part of a vestigial railroad switch track for a siding at the location that in 1925 no longer existed), diverting the engine to the right and causing it to derail entirely. As the engine left the roadbed, it tilted to the left and buried itself in the railroad embankment parallel to the tracks, with the front end of the engine 450 feet (140 meters) from the east end of the Hazen Road crossing. The rapid deceleration of the engine caused the first passenger car, No. 23, to uncouple from the tender. The momentum of the cars behind it pushed No. 23 forward until it came to rest on the locomotive's boiler; the second passenger car, No. 33, followed, coming to rest across the rear of the boiler. The third car, the sleeping car Sirocco, came to rest next to the engine. The first two cars were carrying ninety people, the third nearly twenty.

The crash ripped valves and steam fittings from the locomotive's boiler, allowing superheated steam to spray into the broken windows of the passenger cars above and beside. Many passengers who survived the initial impact were fatally scalded by the escaping steam. The New York Times dubbed the first coach the "Death Car".

Citizens and doctors of Hackettstown soon arrived, in spite of the fire that still raged across town. What they found was a horrific scene: in the pitch darkness of the cloudy night of this bucolic setting was indescribable suffering amongst dozens of train passengers. Because the two tracks were blocked by the derailed cars, the injured were taken by rescue trains going in opposite directions to several area hospitals, most of which were fairly distant: Easton in Pennsylvania and Phillipsburg; Dover; and Morristown in New Jersey, as Hackettstown did not as yet have a hospital. Joseph Snyder, a local farmer who witnessed the accident and also helped spread word across the town, would later say of the wreck site, "There were men and women and kids all around everywhere, screaming worse than I ever heard".

A watchman at a road in Hackettstown heard the whistle blowing for the Hazen Road crossing three miles away. When the train failed to blow its whistle for the next crossing (Airport Road) the watchman suspected that there was a problem and held a westbound freight train that was about to pass through Hackettstown minutes after the accident at Rockport.

== Victims ==
The porter of the Sirocco, Oscar (O.J.) Daniels, closed a door through which steam was spewing, saving many passengers' lives but suffering severe burns. Daniels then walked up the hill to the nearby game farm to use the telephone. His attempt would be in vain, however, as phone service to the farm had been knocked out by the storm. On his way back to the scene, Daniels collapsed and died on Hazen Road.

Seven bodies were ultimately pulled from the wreck, including Loomis who, according to the lurid accounts of the day, had been impaled upon the engineer's controls in the locomotive's cab. Many more people were severely scalded and would die after hours or days of agony. Pillows and sheets from the Pullman cars were used to try to ease the suffering. In addition to Loomis, the fireman, the conductor, and the head brakeman died in or because of the accident; the flagman, who was at the rear of the train, was the only railroad employee aboard to survive. Many of the victims died en route to, or at, the hospital.

It is unclear exactly how many passengers died in the accident. Five of the dead could not be identified: two adult males (Cochran's morgue); an unidentified girl about the age of eight (Cochran's morgue); a girl about the age of three (Easton hospital); and an unidentified woman (Farner? at a hospital in Morristown). Mrs. Farner is listed among the dead, but is also listed as possibly being the "unidentified" woman who died at the hospital in Morristown. Also, an off-duty railroader who was riding in the locomotive cab at the time of the accident, W. Kenney, was initially listed amongst the injured, but subsequently died. Ten people from the initial list of injured died from their injuries, but their names are not specified.

Some families were completely wiped out. Others were separated from loved ones who may not have known where they had been taken, in a place nearly a thousand miles (1,400 km) from home. Indeed, rescue trains took the injured in opposite directions from the crash site to hospitals in Morristown and Easton, destinations that were 50 miles (80 km) apart. Adding to the confusion, some passengers did not speak English or spoke it poorly. All in all, 47 are thought to have died; some accounts placed the total number of deaths at 50, but this may include people who were counted twice.

== Investigation ==
A joint investigation by the Interstate Commerce Commission (ICC) and the New Jersey Board of Public Utility Commissioners found that there was no blame to be apportioned and that the accident had been caused by an Act of God.

It remains unknown whether the train was exceeding the speed limit at the time of the wreck, as locomotive No. 1104 did not have a speed recorder. The ICC report of July 11, 1925, incorrectly lists the speed limit at Rockport as 70 mph; the 1925 employee timetable lists the speed limit on the entire 40-mile DLW Old Road as 50 mph. When the ICC interviewed the train's flagman in the days following the accident, he said the train was traveling 70 mph at Rockport. Several porters told the ICC that they thought the train was traveling about 45 mph; the flagman subsequently revised his account to 50 mph.

Several days after the accident, a jury convened in a coroner's inquest at the new opera house in Washington, New Jersey, and heard testimony that pinpointed the cause of the derailment. Elmer Clayton, Mansfield Township's road supervisor, testified that the gutters on Hazen Road had been dug out recently near the area of the train accident and this material—dirt, gravel and stones—had been pushed to the center of the road to build up the crown in anticipation of laying macadam. Clayton surmised that this loose debris had been washed down the steep slope during the rain storm and then onto the grade crossing where it clogged the flangeways, thus leading to the derailment.

== Aftermath ==
In recognition of Daniels' bravery, the Sirocco was renamed the Daniels. He is the only Pullman porter memorialized. Engine 1104 returned to service and operated until it was scrapped in 1946.

In spite of the accident, 110 of the train's passengers boarded the steamship bound for Germany the following morning.

As of 2020, the railroad past Rockport Crossing consists of a single track, the same eastbound track on which the 1925 wreck occurred. The right-of-way is owned by Norfolk Southern Railway and operated by Dover and Delaware River Railroad, a subsidiary of Chesapeake and Delaware LLC. A small garden and a brass plaque, laid on the 70th anniversary of the wreck, commemorate the site "where 50 people died or were fatally injured, some from the impact of the crash but most from the inescapable steam".

== Gallery ==
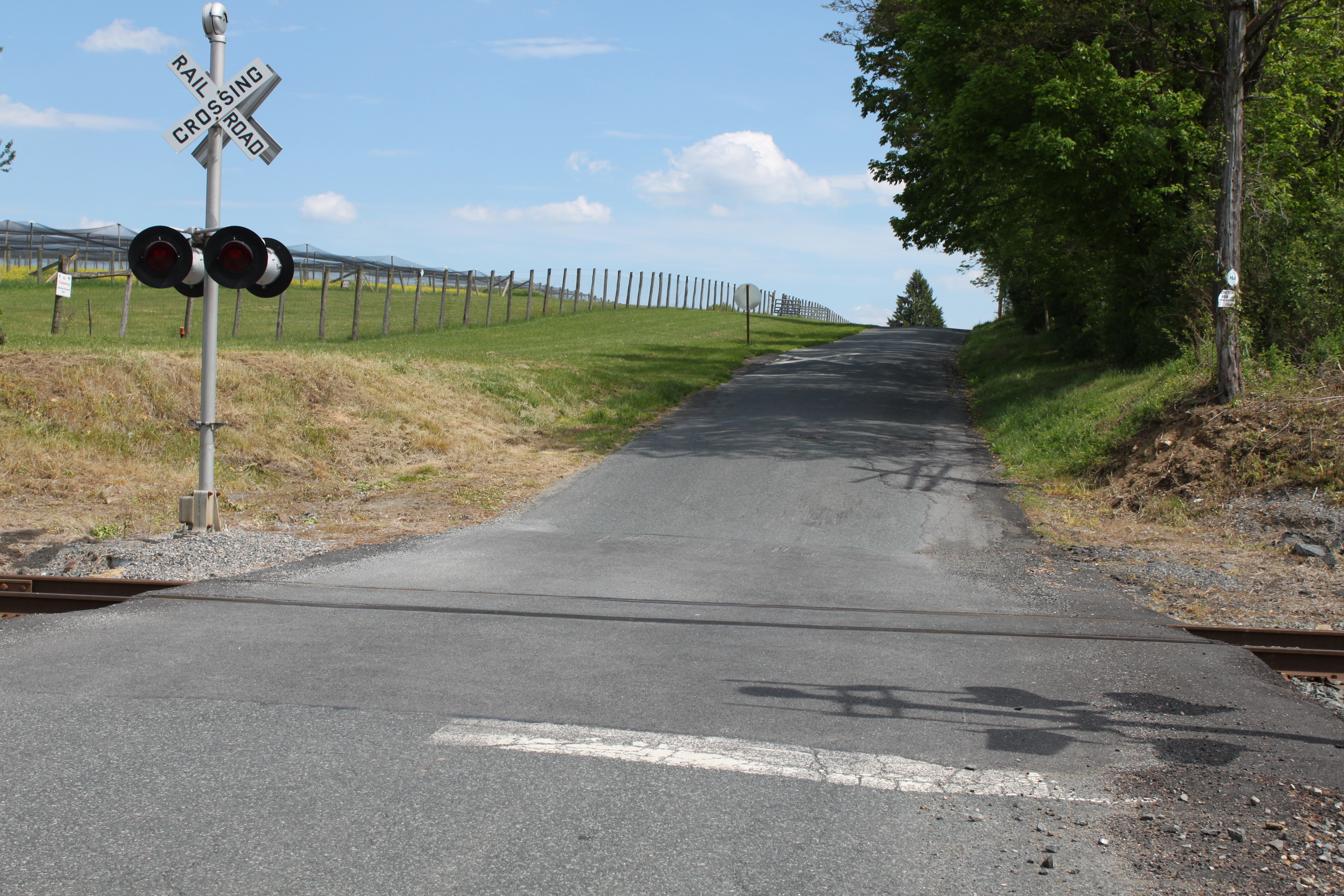
A 2012 photo of the Hazen Road grade crossing in Rockport, New Jersey.

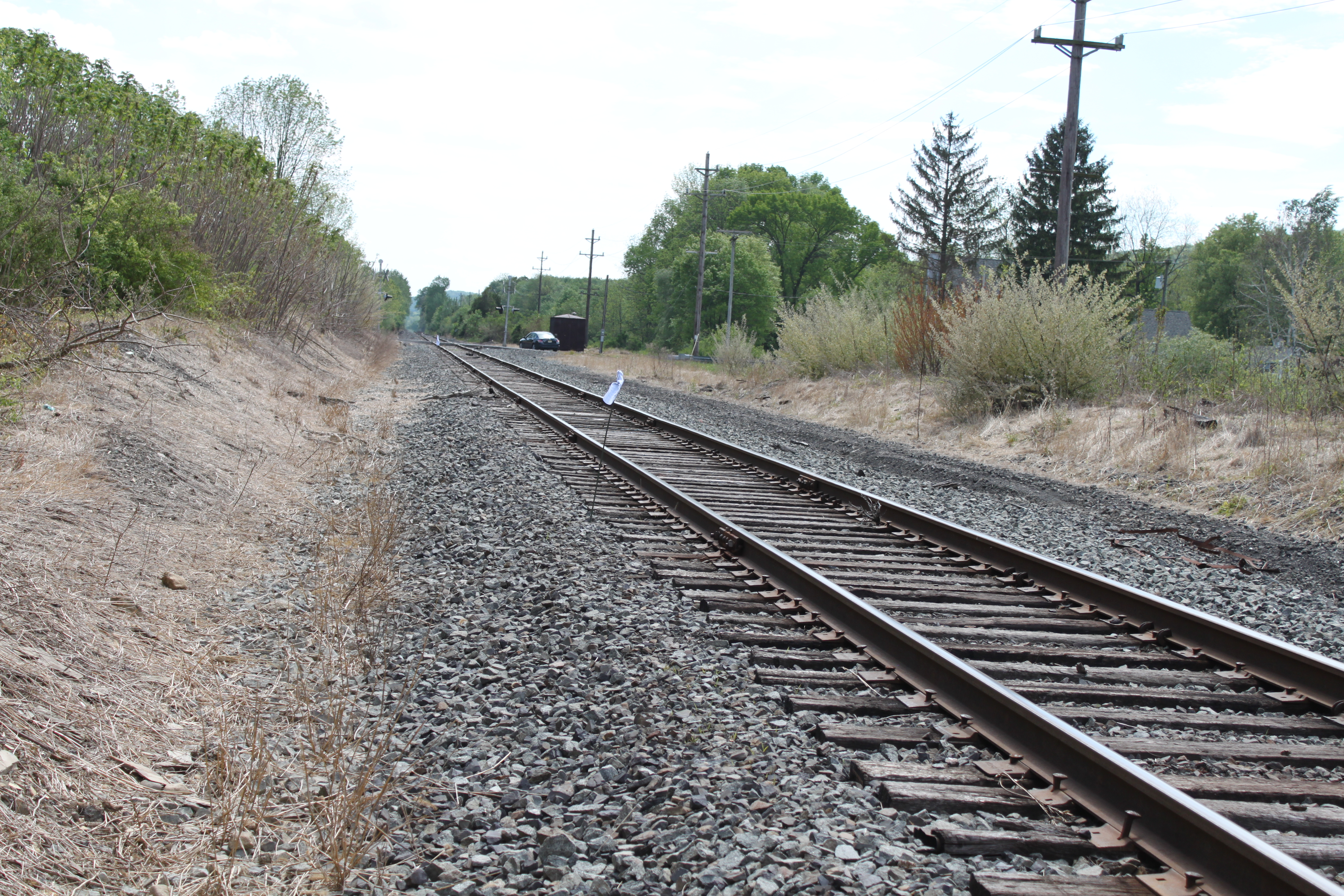
Westward-looking 2012 photo of the wreck site. The near white flag marks the location of the front end of Engine 1104 after the crash; the far one, the location of the switch frog. The house on Hazen Road is visible in 1925 photos.
