= Mansfield Township, Warren County, New Jersey =

Township in Warren County, New Jersey, US

Mansfield Township, New Jersey
- Township
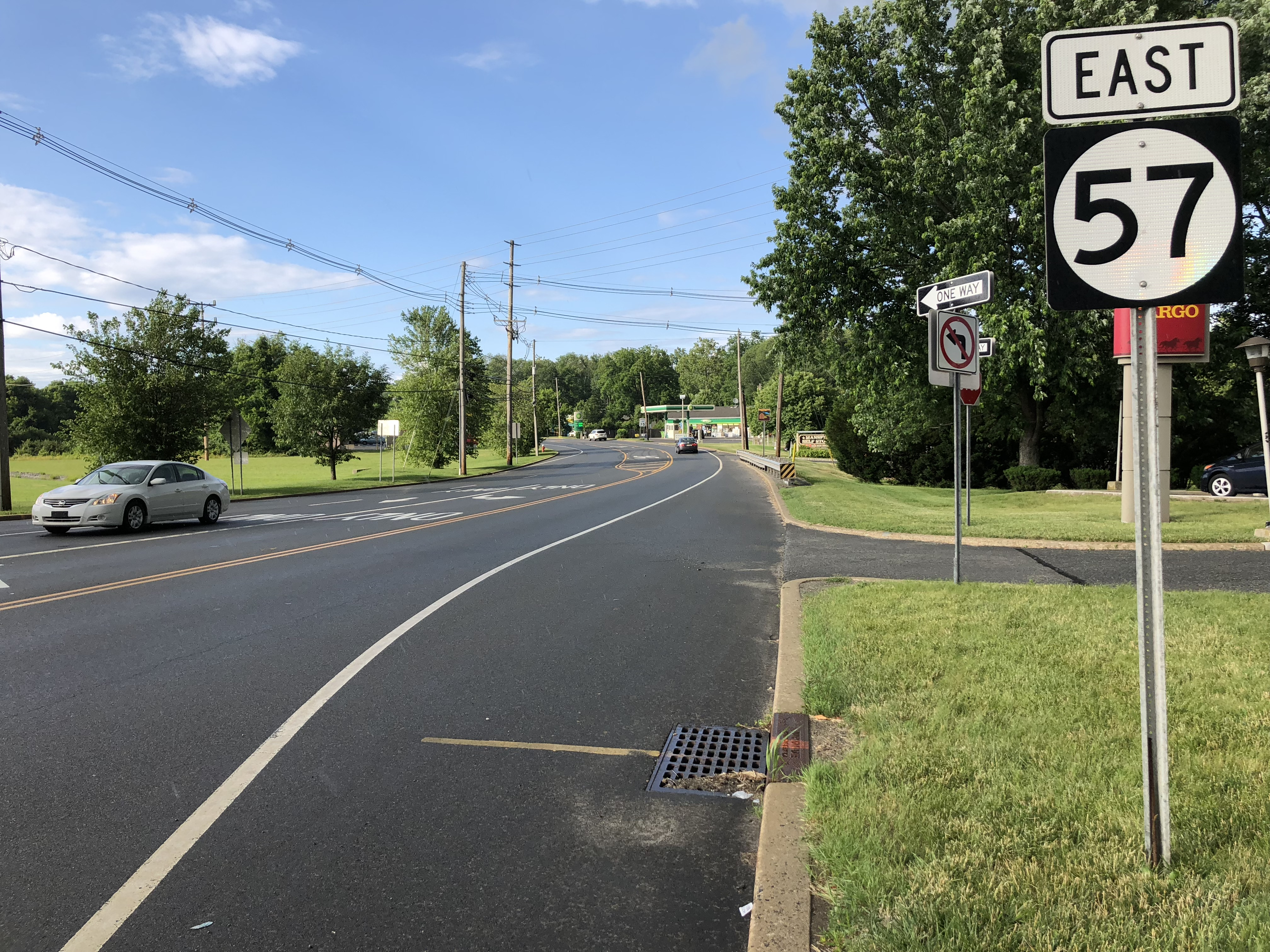
- Looking east along Route 57 in Mansfield Township

- Seal

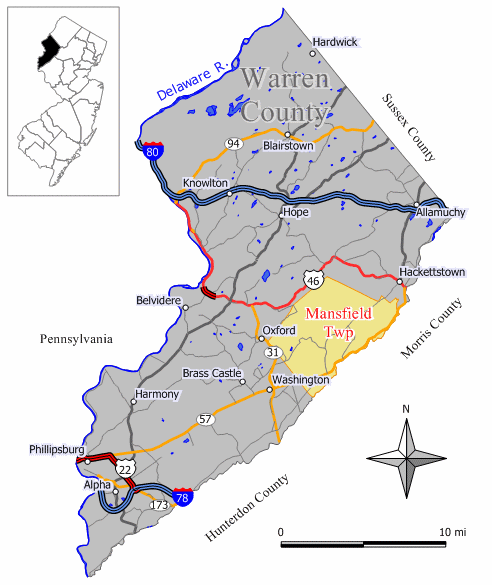
- Location of Mansfield Township in Warren County highlighted in yellow (right). Inset map: Location of Warren County in New Jersey highlighted in black (left).

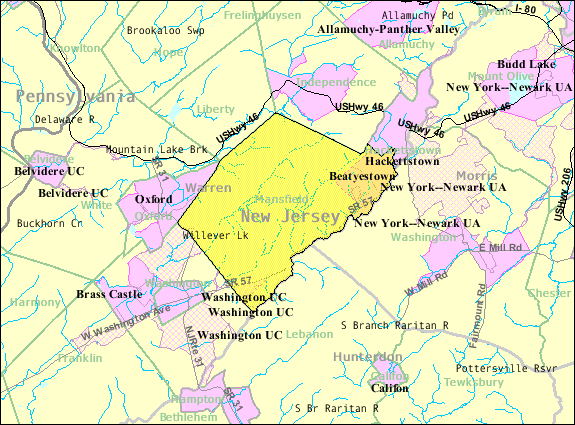
- Census Bureau map of Mansfield Township, Warren County, New Jersey

- Location in Warren County Location in New Jersey Location in the United States
- Coordinates: 40.808461°N 74.910234°W
- Country: United States
- State: New Jersey
- County: Warren
- Formed: May 30, 1754, as Mansfield-Woodhouse Township
- Incorporated: February 21, 1798
- Named for: William Murray, 1st Earl of Mansfield

Government
  - Type: Township
  - Body: Township Committee
  - Mayor: Joseph Watters (R, term ends December 31, 2023)
  - Municipal clerk: Monica Orlando (acting)

Area
  - Total: 29.69 sq mi (76.90 km^{2})
  - Land: 29.59 sq mi (76.63 km^{2})
  - Water: 0.10 sq mi (0.27 km^{2}) 0.35%
  - Rank: 90th of 565 in state 3rd of 22 in county
- Elevation: 820 ft (250 m)

Population (2020)
  - Total: 7,781
  - Estimate (2023): 7,876
  - Rank: 299th of 565 in state 4th of 22 in county
  - Density: 263/sq mi (102/km^{2})
  - Rank: 488th of 565 in state 12th of 22 in county
- Time zone: UTC−05:00 (Eastern (EST))
  - Summer (DST): UTC−04:00 (Eastern (EDT))
- ZIP Code: 07865 – Port Murray
- Area code: 908
- FIPS code: 3404143320
- GNIS feature ID: 0882249
- Website: mansfieldtownship-nj.gov

Mansfield Township is a township in Warren County, in the U.S. state of New Jersey. As of the 2020 United States census, the township's population was 7,781, its highest decennial census count ever, and an increase of 56 (+0.7%) from the 2010 census count of 7,725, which in turn reflected an increase of 1,072 (+16.1%) from the 6,653 counted in the 2000 census.

What is now Mansfield Township was formed on May 30, 1754, as Mansfield-Woodhouse Township from portions of Greenwich Township, while the area was still part of Sussex County, and was incorporated as Mansfield Township on February 21, 1798, as one of New Jersey's initial group of 104 townships by an act of the New Jersey Legislature. The township became part of the newly formed Warren County on November 20, 1824. Portions of the township were taken to form Franklin Township (April 8, 1839) and Washington Township (April 9, 1849). The township was named after William Murray, 1st Earl of Mansfield.

== Geography ==
According to the United States Census Bureau, the township had a total area of 29.69 square miles (76.90 km^{2}), including 29.59 square miles (76.63 km^{2}) of land and 0.11 square miles (0.27 km^{2}) of water (0.35%).

Anderson (with a 2020 Census population of 306), Beattystown (4,701) and Port Murray (227) are unincorporated communities and census-designated places (CDPs) located within the township.

Other unincorporated communities, localities and place names located partially or completely within the township include Karrsville, Mount Bethel, Penwell, Rockport and Stephensburg.

The township borders the municipalities of Hackettstown, Independence Township, Liberty Township, Oxford Township and Washington Township in Warren County; Lebanon Township in Hunterdon County; and Washington Township in Morris County.

== Demographics ==
Historical population
Census	Pop.	Note	%±
1810	2,058		—
1820	2,787		35.4%
1830	3,310		18.8%
1840	3,057	*	−7.6%
1850	1,615	*	−47.2%
1860	1,688		4.5%
1870	1,997		18.3%
1880	1,709		−14.4%
1890	1,362		−20.3%
1900	1,324		−2.8%
1910	1,238		−6.5%
1920	1,133		−8.5%
1930	1,139		0.5%
1940	1,254		10.1%
1950	1,497		19.4%
1960	2,130		42.3%
1970	3,546		66.5%
1980	5,780		63.0%
1990	7,154		23.8%
2000	6,653		−7.0%
2010	7,725		16.1%
2020	7,781		0.7%
2023 (est.)	7,876		1.2%
Population sources: 1810–1920 1840 1850–1870; 1850 1870 1880–1890; 1890–1910 1910–1930; 1940–2000 2000; 2010 2020 * = Lost territory in previous decade

The Township's economic data (as is all of Warren County) is calculated by the U.S. Census Bureau as part of the Allentown-Bethlehem-Easton, PA-NJ Metropolitan Statistical Area.

=== 2010 census ===
The 2010 United States census counted 7,725 people, 2,972 households, and 2,000 families in the township. The population density was 259.1 per square mile (100.0/km^{2}). There were 3,316 housing units at an average density of 111.2 per square mile (42.9/km^{2}). The racial makeup was 86.73% (6,700) White, 4.89% (378) Black or African American, 0.18% (14) Native American, 3.21% (248) Asian, 0.03% (2) Pacific Islander, 3.06% (236) from other races, and 1.90% (147) from two or more races. Hispanic or Latino of any race were 10.94% (845) of the population.

Of the 2,972 households, 31.4% had children under the age of 18; 51.8% were married couples living together; 10.7% had a female householder with no husband present and 32.7% were non-families. Of all households, 25.5% were made up of individuals and 7.7% had someone living alone who was 65 years of age or older. The average household size was 2.54 and the average family size was 3.08.

22.9% of the population were under the age of 18, 7.9% from 18 to 24, 26.8% from 25 to 44, 29.7% from 45 to 64, and 12.8% who were 65 years of age or older. The median age was 40.7 years. For every 100 females, the population had 94.6 males. For every 100 females ages 18 and older there were 93.4 males.

The Census Bureau's 2006–2010 American Community Survey showed that (in 2010 inflation-adjusted dollars) median household income was $74,063 (with a margin of error of +/− $8,316) and the median family income was $87,434 (+/− $8,330). Males had a median income of $56,567 (+/− $5,612) versus $41,583 (+/− $1,597) for females. The per capita income for the borough was $32,259 (+/− $2,751). About 5.1% of families and 6.3% of the population were below the poverty line, including 8.3% of those under age 18 and 3.9% of those age 65 or over.

=== 2000 census ===
As of the 2000 United States census there were 6,653 people, 2,334 households, and 1,750 families residing in the township. The population density was 222.3 inhabitants per square mile (85.8/km^{2}). There were 2,415 housing units at an average density of 80.7 per square mile (31.2/km^{2}). The racial makeup of the township was 90.91% White, 4.51% African American, 0.24% Native American, 1.22% Asian, 1.59% from other races, and 1.53% from two or more races. Hispanic or Latino of any race were 4.37% of the population.

There were 2,334 households, out of which 39.0% had children under the age of 18 living with them, 61.3% were married couples living together, 9.0% had a female householder with no husband present, and 25.0% were non-families. 18.9% of all households were made up of individuals, and 6.3% had someone living alone who was 65 years of age or older. The average household size was 2.76 and the average family size was 3.18.

In the ownship the population was spread out, with 27.0% under the age of 18, 6.2% from 18 to 24, 32.4% from 25 to 44, 22.7% from 45 to 64, and 11.7% who were 65 years of age or older. The median age was 37 years. For every 100 females, there were 94.8 males. For every 100 females age 18 and over, there were 91.2 males.

The median income for a household in the township was $61,763, and the median income for a family was $76,102. Males had a median income of $50,295 versus $35,737 for females. The per capita income for the township was $26,277. About 2.7% of families and 3.9% of the population were below the poverty line, including 3.9% of those under age 18 and 5.9% of those age 65 or over.

== Government ==
=== Local government ===
Mansfield Township is governed under the Township form of New Jersey municipal government, one of 141 municipalities (of the 564) statewide that use this form, the second-most commonly used form of government in the state. The Township Committee is comprised of five members, who are elected directly by the voters at-large in partisan elections to serve three-year terms of office on a staggered basis, with either one or two seats coming up for election each year as part of the November general election in a three-year cycle. At an annual reorganization meeting conducted during the first week of January, the Township Committee selects one of its members to serve as Mayor and another to serve as Deputy Mayor.

As of 2022, members of the Mansfield Township Committee are Mayor Joseph E. Watters (R, term on committee ends December 31, 2024; term as mayor ends 2022), Deputy mayor Glen McGuinness (R, term on committee and as deputy mayor ends 2022; elected to serve an unexpired term), Desiree Mora Dillon (R, 2022) and Joseph D. Farino (R, 2023) and Ronald Hayes (R, 2023).

In January 2020, Tony Cardell, who had been elected as a Republican in November 2019, announced that he would not be taking office for the seat expiring in December 2022. Glen McGuinness was elected in November 2021 to fill the balance of the term of office.

=== Federal, state, and county representation ===
Mansfield Township is located in the 7th Congressional District and is part of New Jersey's 23rd state legislative district.

For the 119th United States Congress, New Jersey's 7th congressional district is represented by Thomas Kean Jr. (R, Westfield). New Jersey is represented in the United States Senate by Democrats Cory Booker (Newark, term ends 2027) and Andy Kim (Moorestown, term ends 2031).

For the 2026–2027 session, the 23rd legislative district of the New Jersey Legislature is represented in the State Senate by Doug Steinhardt (R, Lopatcong Township) and in the General Assembly by John DiMaio (R, Hackettstown) and Erik Peterson (R, Franklin Township).

Warren County is governed by a three-member Board of County Commissioners, who are chosen at-large on a staggered basis in partisan elections with one seat coming up for election each year as part of the November general election. At an annual reorganization meeting held in the beginning of January, the board selects one of its members to serve as Commissioner Director and other as Deputy Director. As of 2025, Warren County's Commissioners are:

Deputy Director Jason J. Sarnoski (R, Lopatcong Township; 2025), Lori Ciesla (R, Lopatcong Township; 2026), and Director James R. Kern III (R, Pohatcong Township; 2027).

Constitutional officers of Warren County are: Clerk Holly Mackey (R, Alpha; 2027), Sheriff James McDonald Sr. (R, Phillipsburg; 2025) and Surrogate Michael J. Doherty (R, Washington; 2025).

=== Politics ===
As of March 2011, there were a total of 4,443 registered voters in Mansfield Township, of which 779 (17.5% vs. 21.5% countywide) were registered as Democrats, 1,784 (40.2% vs. 35.3%) were registered as Republicans and 1,877 (42.2% vs. 43.1%) were registered as Unaffiliated. There were three voters registered as Libertarians or Greens. Among the township's 2010 Census population, 57.5% (vs. 62.3% in Warren County) were registered to vote, including 74.6% of those ages 18 and over (vs. 81.5% countywide).

Gubernatorial election results for Mansfield Township
Year	Republican		Democratic		Third party(ies)	
Year	No.	%	No.	%	No.	%
2025	1,776	58.17%	1,258	41.21%	19	0.62%
2021	1,610	66.75%	778	32.26%	24	1.00%
2017	1,163	64.90%	580	32.37%	49	2.73%
2013	1,251	74.07%	401	23.74%	37	2.19%
2009	1,415	67.48%	482	22.99%	200	9.54%
2005	1,241	64.67%	584	30.43%	94	4.90%

In the 2012 presidential election, Republican Mitt Romney received 1,789 votes (57.6% vs. 56.0% countywide), ahead of Democrat Barack Obama with 1,232 votes (39.7% vs. 40.8%) and other candidates with 45 votes (1.4% vs. 1.7%), among the 3,105 ballots cast by the township's 4,596 registered voters, for a turnout of 67.6% (vs. 66.7% in Warren County). In the 2008 presidential election, Republican John McCain received 1,925 votes (57.5% vs. 55.2% countywide), ahead of Democrat Barack Obama with 1,328 votes (39.7% vs. 41.4%) and other candidates with 50 votes (1.5% vs. 1.6%), among the 3,349 ballots cast by the township's 4,504 registered voters, for a turnout of 74.4% (vs. 73.4% in Warren County). In the 2004 presidential election, Republican George W. Bush received 2,043 votes (64.6% vs. 61.0% countywide), ahead of Democrat John Kerry with 1,076 votes (34.0% vs. 37.2%) and other candidates with 34 votes (1.1% vs. 1.3%), among the 3,163 ballots cast by the township's 4,227 registered voters, for a turnout of 74.8% (vs. 76.3% in the whole county).

United States presidential election results for Mansfield Township
Year	Republican		Democratic		Third party(ies)	
Year	No.	%	No.	%	No.	%
2024	2,477	59.60%	1,590	38.26%	89	2.14%
2020	2,260	56.20%	1,674	41.63%	87	2.16%
2016	2,015	61.62%	1,129	34.53%	126	3.85%
2012	1,789	58.35%	1,232	40.18%	45	1.47%
2008	1,925	58.28%	1,328	40.21%	50	1.51%
2004	2,043	64.80%	1,076	34.13%	34	1.08%

In the 2013 gubernatorial election, Republican Chris Christie received 74.1% of the vote (1,251 cast), ahead of Democrat Barbara Buono with 23.7% (401 votes), and other candidates with 2.2% (37 votes), among the 1,715 ballots cast by the township's 4,683 registered voters (26 ballots were spoiled), for a turnout of 36.6%. In the 2009 gubernatorial election, Republican Chris Christie received 1,415 votes (66.5% vs. 61.3% countywide), ahead of Democrat Jon Corzine with 482 votes (22.6% vs. 25.7%), Independent Chris Daggett with 171 votes (8.0% vs. 9.8%) and other candidates with 29 votes (1.4% vs. 1.5%), among the 2,129 ballots cast by the township's 4,360 registered voters, yielding a 48.8% turnout (vs. 49.6% in the county).

United States Senate election results for Mansfield Township1
Year	Republican		Democratic		Third party(ies)	
Year	No.	%	No.	%	No.	%
2024	2,364	59.16%	1,536	38.44%	96	2.40%
2018	1,463	61.68%	808	34.06%	101	4.26%
2012	1,681	57.85%	1,172	40.33%	53	1.82%
2006	1,156	63.31%	608	33.30%	62	3.40%

United States Senate election results for Mansfield Township2
Year	Republican		Democratic		Third party(ies)	
Year	No.	%	No.	%	No.	%
2020	2,204	55.97%	1,604	40.73%	130	3.30%
2014	1,021	65.32%	492	31.48%	50	3.20%
2013	779	68.27%	352	30.85%	10	0.88%
2008	1,848	60.06%	1,145	37.21%	84	2.73%

== Education ==
Students in public school for pre-kindergarten through sixth grade are served by the Mansfield Township School District at Mansfield Township Elementary School. As of the 2023–24 school year, the district, comprised of one school, had an enrollment of 582 students and 60.0 classroom teachers (on an FTE basis), for a student–teacher ratio of 9.7:1.

Public school students in seventh through twelfth grades attend the schools of the Warren Hills Regional School District, which also serves students from the municipalities of Franklin Township, Washington Borough and Washington Township, along with those from Oxford Township (for 9–12 only, attending on a tuition basis). Schools in the district (with 2023–24 enrollment data from the National Center for Education Statistics) are Warren Hills Regional Middle School with 480 students in grades 7–8 (located in Washington Borough) and Warren Hills Regional High School with 1,066 students in grades 9–12 (located in Washington Township). Seats on the high school district's nine-member board of education are allocated to based on the population of the constituent municipalities, with three seats assigned to Mansfield Township. Oxford Township does not have representation on the board since it sends its students as part of a sending/receiving relationship.

Students from the township and from all of Warren County are eligible to attend Ridge and Valley Charter School in Frelinghuysen Township (for grades K–8) or Warren County Technical School in Washington borough (for 9–12), with special education services provided by local districts supplemented throughout the county by the Warren County Special Services School District in Oxford Township (for PreK–12).

== Transportation ==
=== Roads and highways ===
As of May 2010, the township had a total of 72.40 miles (116.52 km) of roadways, of which 46.85 miles (75.40 km) were maintained by the municipality, 16.79 miles (27.02 km) by Warren County and 8.76 miles (14.10 km) by the New Jersey Department of Transportation.

The only major roads that pass through are Route 31 which passes through briefly in the west and Route 57 runs for 7.9 miles (12.7 km) in the southern part.

No limited access roads traverse through. However, they are accessible two towns over such as Interstate 78 (in Franklin, Union, Clinton and Tewksbury townships) and Interstate 80 (in Knowlton, Hope, Allamuchy and Mount Olive townships).

=== Public transportation ===
A small general aviation airport, named Hackettstown Airport and holding the official database designation of (FAA LID: N05) is in Mansfield Township, only a few hundred yards from the municipal border with Hackettstown.

Rail service is provided into Hackettstown by NJ Transit. South of Hackettstown, Norfolk Southern's Washington Secondary passes the location of the Rockport Wreck, a train accident that occurred on June 16, 1925, that resulted in 50 fatalities.

== Notable people ==
People who were born in, residents of, or otherwise closely associated with Mansfield Township include:

- John D. Bulkeley (1911–1996), vice admiral in the United States Navy who was one of its most decorated naval officers
- John Eugene Kunzler (1923– 2006), scientist and physicist who conducted pioneering research into the field of superconducting magnets.
- Michael Weiner (1961–2013), attorney who served as the fifth executive director of the Major League Baseball Players Association
