= Broadway, New Jersey =

Populated place in Warren County, New Jersey, US

- Census-designated place
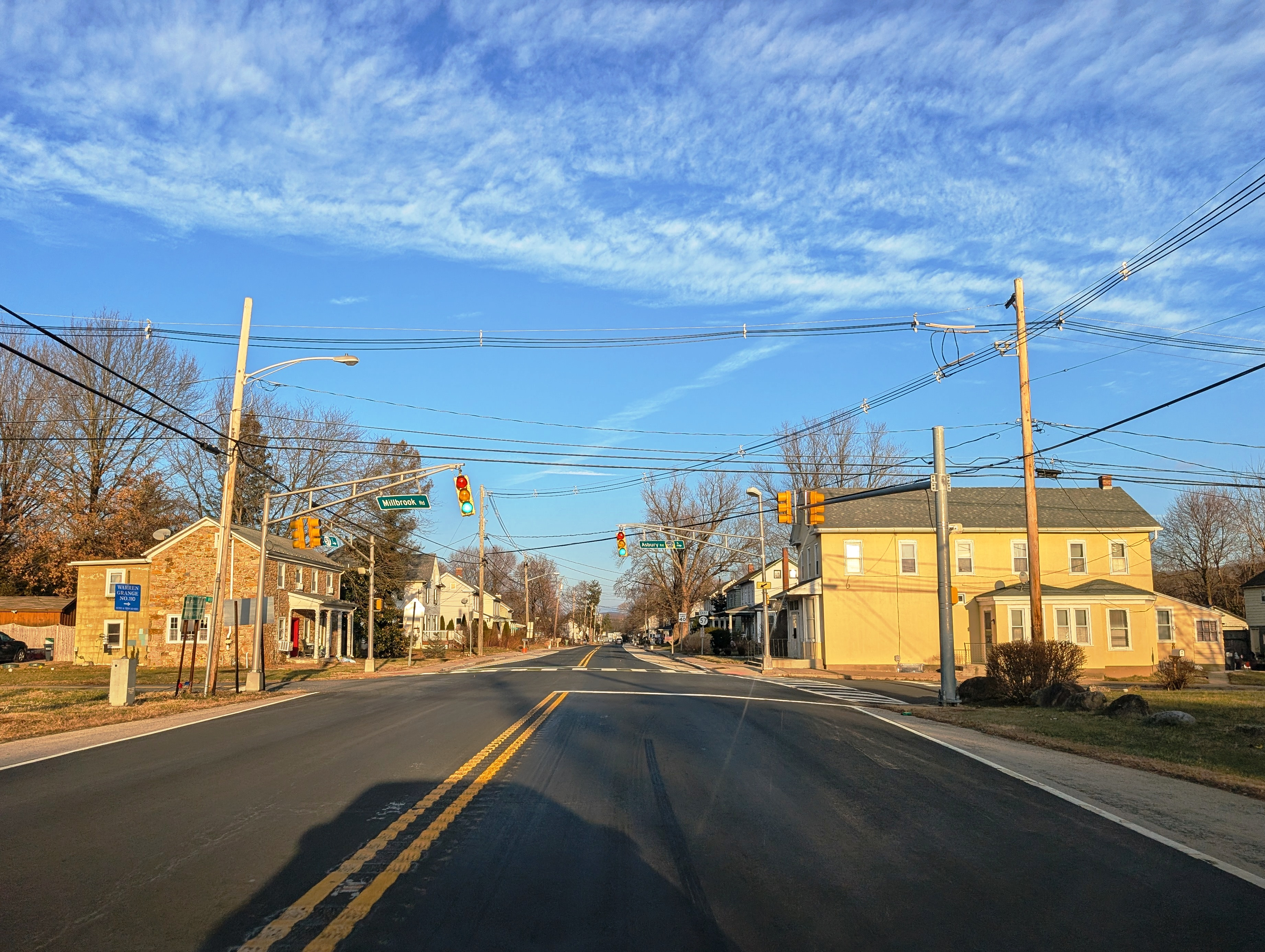
- Route 57 eastbound in Broadway

- Location in Warren County Location in New Jersey Location in the United States
- Coordinates: 40.73706°N 75.048628°W
- Country: United States
- State: New Jersey
- County: Warren
- Township: Franklin

Area
  - Total: 0.37 sq mi (0.96 km^{2})
  - Land: 0.37 sq mi (0.96 km^{2})
  - Water: 0 sq mi (0.00 km^{2}) 0.03%
- Elevation: 374 ft (114 m)

Population (2020)
  - Total: 213
  - Density: 573.5/sq mi (221.44/km^{2})
- Time zone: UTC−05:00 (Eastern (EST))
  - Summer (DST): UTC−04:00 (EDT)
- ZIP Code: 08808
- Area code: 908
- FIPS code: 34-08020
- GNIS feature ID: 02583974

Broadway is an unincorporated community and census-designated place (CDP) located within Franklin Township, in Warren, in the U.S. state of New Jersey, that was created as part of the 2010 United States census. As of the 2020 census, Broadway had a population of 213.

== Geography ==
According to the United States Census Bureau, the CDP had a total area of 0.371 square miles (0.962 km^{2}), including 0.371 square miles (0.961 km^{2}) of land and 0.000 square miles (0.000 km^{2}) of water (0.03%).

== Demographics ==
Historical population
Census	Pop.	Note	%±
2010	244		—
2020	213		−12.7%
U.S. Decennial Census; 2010 2020

Broadway first appeared as a census designated place in the 2010 U.S. census.

=== 2020 census ===
Broadway CDP, New Jersey – Racial and ethnic composition Note: the US Census treats Hispanic/Latino as an ethnic category. This table excludes Latinos from the racial categories and assigns them to a separate category. Hispanics/Latinos may be of any race.
Race / Ethnicity (NH = Non-Hispanic)	Pop 2010	Pop 2020	% 2010	% 2020
White alone (NH)	228	174	93.44%	81.69%
Black or African American alone (NH)	0	3	0.00%	1.41%
Native American or Alaska Native alone (NH)	0	0	0.00%	0.00%
Asian alone (NH)	3	9	1.23%	4.23%
Native Hawaiian or Pacific Islander alone (NH)	0	0	0.00%	0.00%
Other race alone (NH)	0	3	0.00%	1.41%
Mixed race or Multiracial (NH)	4	9	1.64%	4.23%
Hispanic or Latino (any race)	9	15	3.69%	7.04%
Total	244	213	100.00%	100.00%

=== 2010 census ===
The 2010 United States census counted 244 people, 106 households, and 62 families in the CDP. The population density was 657.4 per square mile (253.8/km^{2}). There were 127 housing units at an average density of 342.1 per square mile (132.1/km^{2}). The racial makeup was 97.13% (237) White, 0.00% (0) Black or African American, 0.00% (0) Native American, 1.23% (3) Asian, 0.00% (0) Pacific Islander, 0.00% (0) from other races, and 1.64% (4) from two or more races. Hispanic or Latino of any race were 3.69% (9) of the population.

Of the 106 households, 16.0% had children under the age of 18; 39.6% were married couples living together; 13.2% had a female householder with no husband present and 41.5% were non-families. Of all households, 31.1% were made up of individuals and 12.3% had someone living alone who was 65 years of age or older. The average household size was 2.30 and the average family size was 2.89.

16.0% of the population were under the age of 18, 14.3% from 18 to 24, 18.4% from 25 to 44, 35.2% from 45 to 64, and 16.0% who were 65 years of age or older. The median age was 45.3 years. For every 100 females, the population had 100.0 males. For every 100 females ages 18 and older there were 93.4 males.
