= Anderson, New Jersey =

Populated place in Warren County, New Jersey, US

- Census-designated place
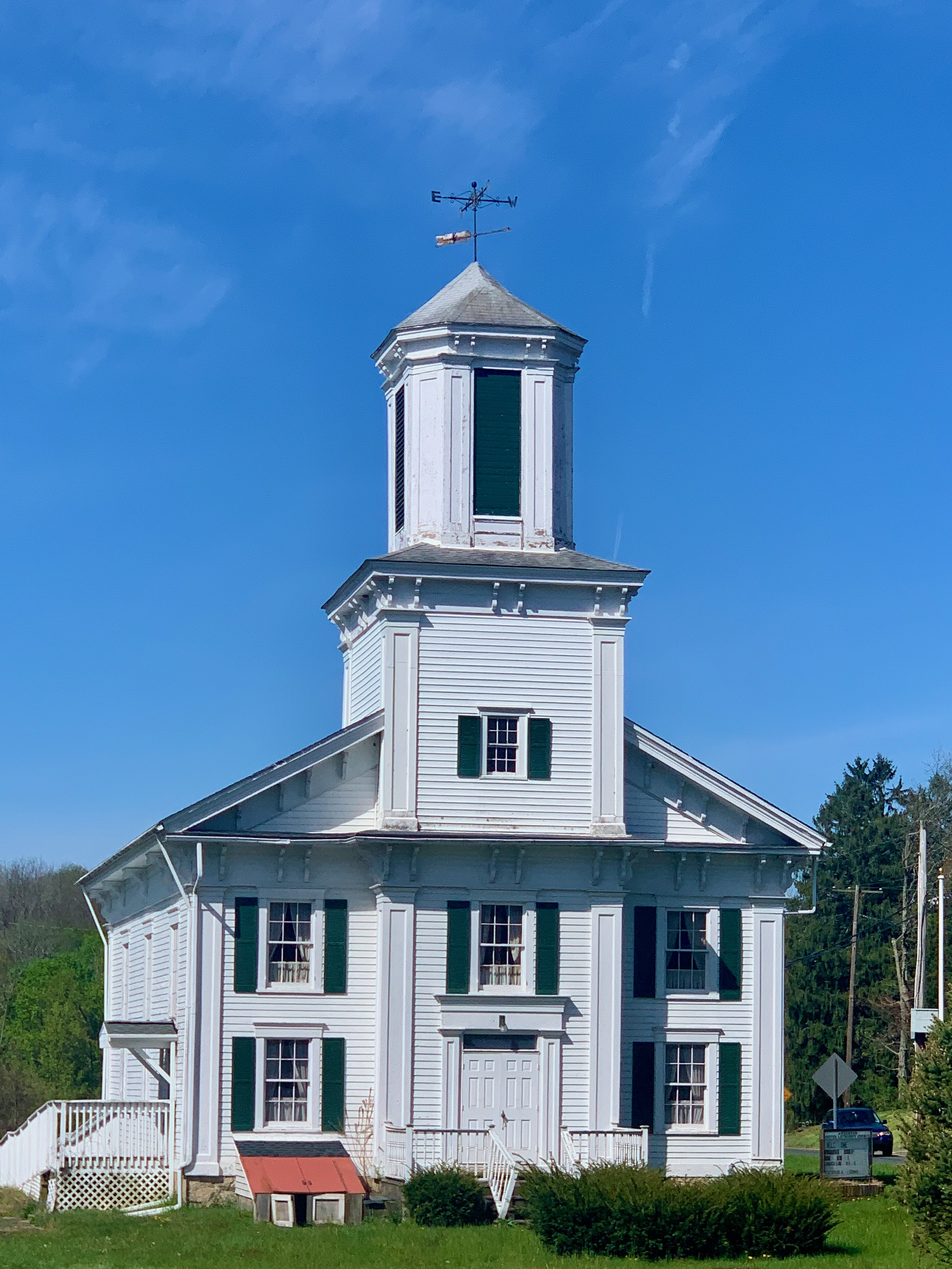
- Anderson United Methodist Church

- Location in Warren County Location in New Jersey Location in the United States
- Coordinates: 40.761867°N 74.929543°W
- Country: United States
- State: New Jersey
- County: Warren
- Township: Mansfield

Area
  - Total: 0.89 sq mi (2.31 km^{2})
  - Land: 0.89 sq mi (2.30 km^{2})
  - Water: 0.0039 sq mi (0.01 km^{2}) 0.34%
- Elevation: 502 ft (153 m)

Population (2020)
  - Total: 306
  - Density: 343.8/sq mi (132.7/km^{2})
- Time zone: UTC−05:00 (Eastern (EST))
  - Summer (DST): UTC−04:00 (EDT)
- Area code: 908
- FIPS code: 34-01300
- GNIS feature ID: 02583965

Anderson is an unincorporated community and census-designated place (CDP) located within Mansfield Township, in Warren County, in the U.S. state of New Jersey, that was created as part of the 2010 United States census. As of the 2020 United States census, the CDP's population was 306, a decrease of 36 (-10.5%) from the 342 enumerated at the 2010 census.

== Geography ==
According to the United States Census Bureau, Anderson had a total area of 0.944 square miles (2.445 km^{2}), including 0.941 square miles (2.436 km^{2}) of land and 0.003 square miles (0.008 km^{2}) of water (0.34%).

== Demographics ==
Historical population
Census	Pop.	Note	%±
2010	342		—
2020	306		−10.5%
2010 2020

Anderson first appeared as a census designated place in the 2010 U.S. census.

=== 2020 census ===
Anderson CDP, New Jersey – Racial and ethnic composition Note: the US Census treats Hispanic/Latino as an ethnic category. This table excludes Latinos from the racial categories and assigns them to a separate category. Hispanics/Latinos may be of any race.
Race / Ethnicity (NH = Non-Hispanic)	Pop 2010	Pop 2020	% 2010	% 2020
White alone (NH)	190	147	55.56%	48.04%
Black or African American alone (NH)	83	44	24.27%	14.38%
Native American or Alaska Native alone (NH)	6	0	1.75%	0.00%
Asian alone (NH)	10	17	2.92%	5.56%
Native Hawaiian or Pacific Islander alone (NH)	0	0	0.00%	0.00%
Other race alone (NH)	4	9	1.17%	2.94%
Mixed race or Multiracial (NH)	9	42	2.63%	13.73%
Hispanic or Latino (any race)	40	47	11.70%	15.36%
Total	342	306	100.00%	100.00%

=== 2010 census ===
The 2010 United States census counted 342 people, 128 households, and 104 families in the CDP. The population density was 363.6 per square mile (140.4/km^{2}). There were 155 housing units at an average density of 164.8 per square mile (63.6/km^{2}). The racial makeup was 63.16% (216) White, 25.73% (88) Black or African American, 2.05% (7) Native American, 2.92% (10) Asian, 0.00% (0) Pacific Islander, 2.34% (8) from other races, and 3.80% (13) from two or more races. Hispanic or Latino of any race were 11.70% (40) of the population.

Of the 128 households, 29.7% had children under the age of 18; 55.5% were married couples living together; 20.3% had a female householder with no husband present and 18.8% were non-families. Of all households, 17.2% were made up of individuals and 9.4% had someone living alone who was 65 years of age or older. The average household size was 2.67 and the average family size was 2.97.

23.7% of the population were under the age of 18, 5.8% from 18 to 24, 23.7% from 25 to 44, 28.4% from 45 to 64, and 18.4% who were 65 years of age or older. The median age was 42.3 years. For every 100 females, the population had 85.9 males. For every 100 females ages 18 and older there were 89.1 males.
