= Pete Perini =

American football player (1928–2008)

No. 39, 54
- Position: Fullback / Linebacker

Personal information
- Born: February 10, 1928; New Village, New Jersey, U.S.
- Died: September 11, 2008 (aged 80); Fountain Hills, Arizona, U.S.
- Listed height: 6 ft 0 in (1.83 m)
- Listed weight: 225 lb (102 kg)

Career information
- High school: New Village (NJ) Washington
- College: Ohio State

Career history
- Chicago Bears (1954–1955); Cleveland Browns (1955)

Awards and highlights
- NFL champion (1955)
- Stats at Pro Football Reference

Evo Peter Perini (February 10, 1928 – September 11, 2008) was an American professional football fullback who played two seasons in the National Football League (NFL) with the Chicago Bears and Cleveland Browns. He played college football at Ohio State University.

== Early life ==
Born in the New Village section of Franklin Township, Warren County, New Jersey, he attended Washington High School, a predecessor to Warren Hills Regional High School. He played high school football, baseball and wrestling at Washington High. In football, he was a three-year letterman as a fullback and was a team captain in 1945. He earned First-team All-State honors in 1945. Perini was a four-year letterman and a four-time New Jersey state finalist in wrestling. He won the state championship in the 175 pound weight class in 1944 and in the heavyweight class in 1945. He also earned second place in the heavyweight class in 1946. In baseball, Perini earned four letters as a left fielder and pitcher. He was inducted into the Blue Streak Wall of Fame in 2001.

== College career ==
Perini played football and baseball for the Ohio State Buckeyes from 1946 to 1950, earning four letters in each sport. In baseball, he became the only pitcher in school history to lead the team in wins and innings pitched in each of his four years as a starter. He had a career record of 30 wins and 13 losses. Perini set school records with a 1.45 earned run average his freshman year and a career ERA of 2.88. He was a punter and linebacker on the football team, helping the Buckeyes win the 1950 Rose Bowl. He was inducted into the Ohio State Athletics Hall of Fame in 2001.

== Professional baseball career ==
Perini was drafted by the Boston Braves of Major League Baseball after his college career. He played for the Hagerstown Braves of the Interstate League as an outfielder from 1950 to 1951.

== Professional football career ==
Perini played in fourteen games for the Chicago Bears from 1954 to 1955. He played in six games for the Cleveland Browns during the 1955 season. His career was cut short due to a knee injury.

== Personal life ==
Perini served in the United States Army during the Korean War. He worked in the Ohio Department of Corrections for nearly three decades. He was also the superintendent of the Marion Correctional Institution until his retirement.
