= Edison Portland Cement Company =

American company, 1899–1920s

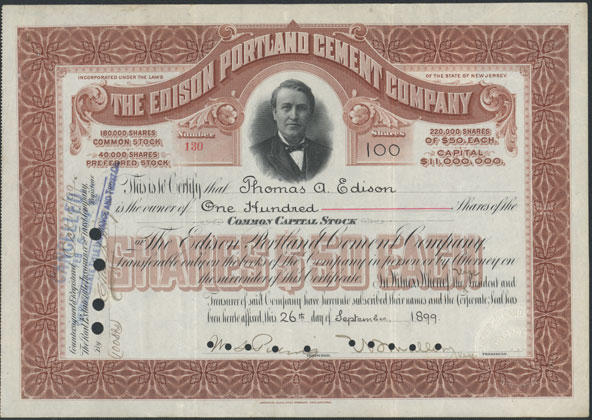
- Share of the Edison Portland Cement Company from the 26th of September 1899
- Industry: Building materials
- Founded: 1899; 127 years ago in New Village, New Jersey, United States
- Founder: Thomas Edison
- Defunct: December 1931; 94 years ago
- Fate: Bankruptcy during the Great Depression
- Products: Portland cement

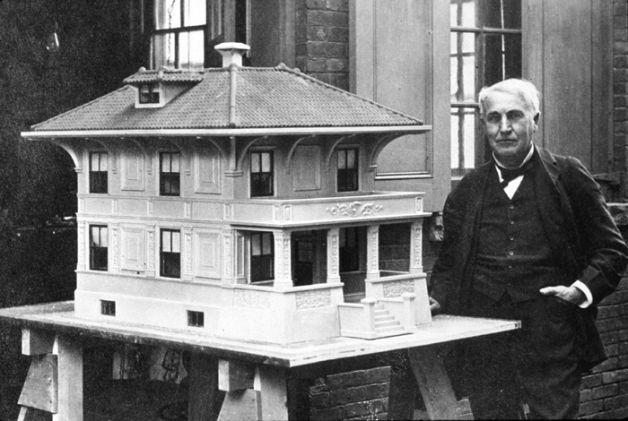
Edison with a model of a concrete house

The Edison Portland Cement Company was a venture by Thomas Edison that helped to improve the Portland cement industry. Edison was developing an iron ore milling process and discovered a market in the sale of waste sand to cement manufacturers. He decided to set up his own cement company, founding it in New Village, New Jersey in 1899, and went on to supply the concrete for the construction of Yankee Stadium in 1922.

== Beginnings ==
In 1881 Edison formed the Edison Ore-Milling Company and tried for many years to make that business a success. The demand was not existent, and although Edison brought new technological innovations to the industry, the company could not compete with the rich ore in the Iron Range. Despite continual investment, with Edison selling shares in General Electric, the company suffered huge losses. Eventually, the ore-crushing technology was sold to other mine owners.

The manufacturing process used by the Edison Ore-Milling Company produced a large quantity of waste sand which he would sell to cement manufacturers. The properties of the fine sand were particularly suitable for concrete, leading to a harder, more durable product. In 1899, Edison decided to join the cement business, reusing some of the technology he had developed for ore-milling.

== Early developments ==
Edison made significant improvements to the production process of cement. His mill in the valley of the Delaware River in New Jersey featured the first long, rotating kilns in the world. While the standard length was between 60 and 80 feet, Edison's kilns were up to 150 feet. To improve his financial stability he licensed the kilns to other manufacturers, but this helped his competitors to improve their production. Eventually, the industry became saturated and Edison's business was not particularly profitable.

== Concrete housing ==
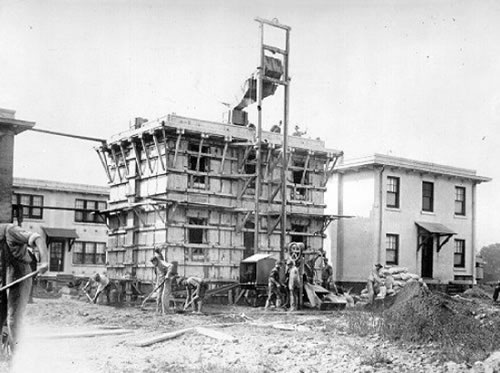
One of Edison's concrete houses under construction in 1919

Somewhat ahead of his time Edison believed that concrete would have a wide range of applications, but in the early 20th century its production was not sufficiently economical. He envisioned a future with concrete houses filled with concrete furniture, refrigerators, and pianos. While none of these items were made Edison did create concrete phonograph cabinets. Edison investigated the use of formwork molds that could repeatedly be used to create concrete houses, experimenting in 1910 by casting a garage and a gardener's cottage at his mansion in New Jersey. He decided to donate the patented information to qualified builders rather than charge for it, generating significant publicity in the process.

Philanthropist Henry Phipps Jr. saw the potential of these affordable houses and considered them to be the solution to New York's housing shortage. He had already invested $1 million into affordable housing projects by setting up Phipps Houses, an organization that continues to this day. Phipps declared his intention to build an entire city for working-class families using the concrete casting technique but Edison was never able to provide the plans.

One of the main difficulties facing the project was its complexity. Each house would be constructed using a mold that comprised 2,300 pieces, and the cost to a builder purchasing the molds was excessive. Nonetheless, some houses were built when investor Charles Ingersoll financed Frank Lambie's plans. Lambie constructed several concrete houses in Union, New Jersey, where they are currently still in use.

== Yankee Stadium ==
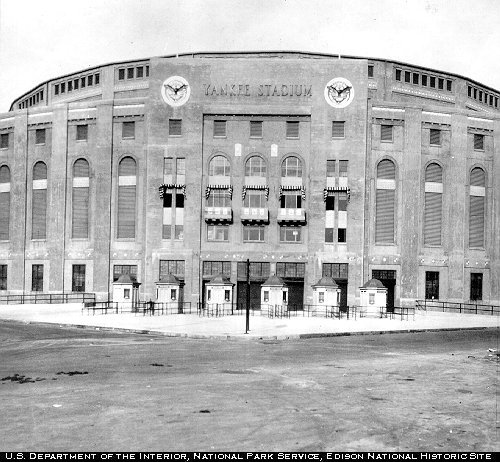
The entrance to the 1923 Yankee Stadium not long after being built in the 1920s

The Edison Portland Cement Company was financially struggling until a new contract was won in 1922. Production began on the original Yankee Stadium on May 5, 1922, and was completed in just 284 working days. Built in the New York City borough of the Bronx, the stadium was home to the New York Yankees until 2008. During the course of the construction 45,000 barrels of cement, 30,000 cubic yards of gravel, and 15,000 cubic yards of sand were mixed by 500 men who produced 35,000 cubic yards of concrete. When the building underwent renovations from 1973 the walls were left untouched because Edison's concrete mix was seen to be hard and durable enough to remain intact.

== Bankruptcy ==
The company was dissolved in December 1931, shortly after Edison's death. It was succeeded by the Edison Cement Corporation, which continued to manufacture cement until June 1942.
