= New Village, New Jersey =

Populated place in Camden County, New Jersey, US

- Census-designated place
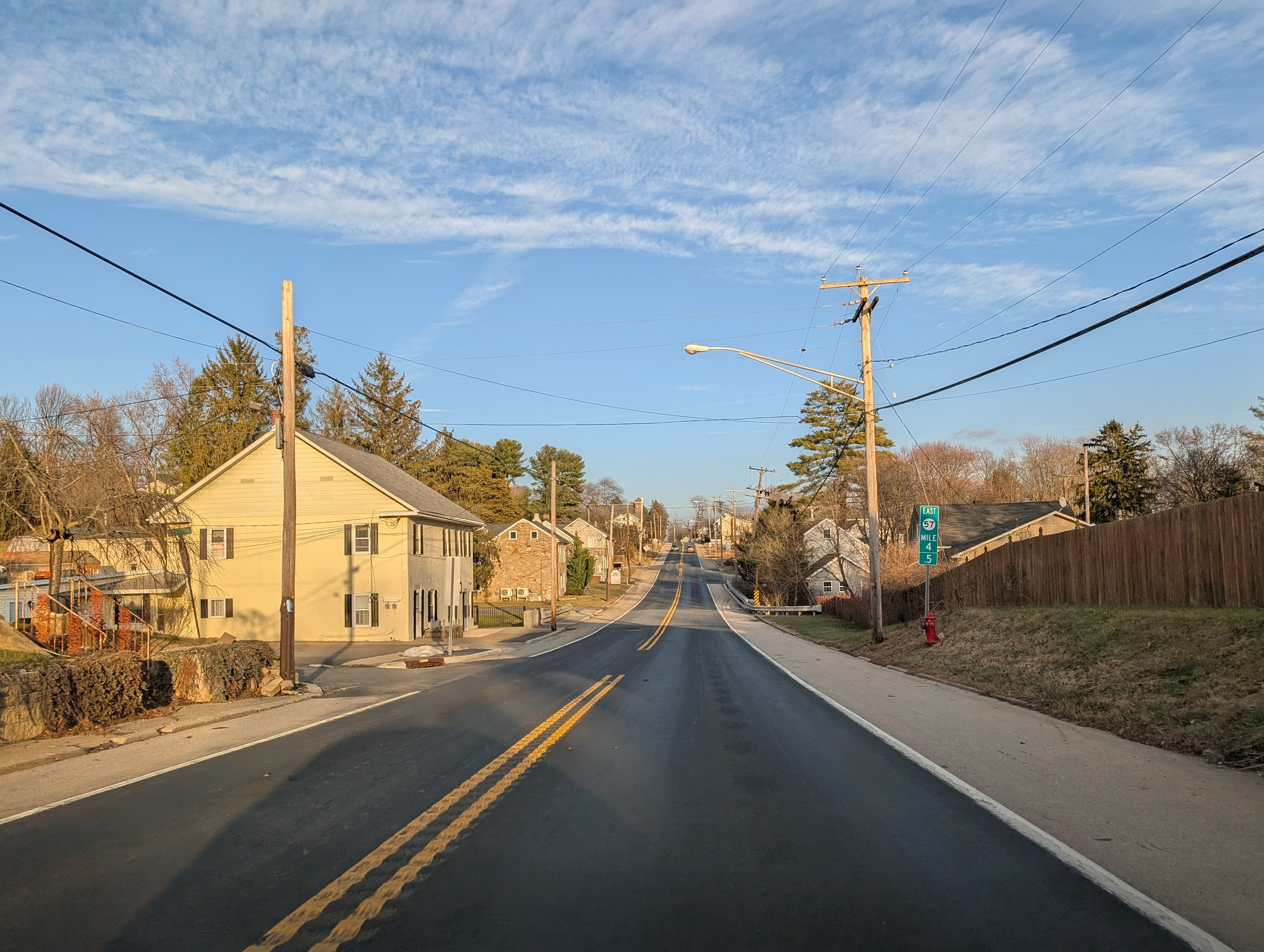
- Route 57 eastbound in New Village

- Location in Warren County Location in New Jersey Location in the United States
- Coordinates: 40.718409°N 75.077244°W
- Country: United States
- State: New Jersey
- County: Warren
- Township: Franklin

Area
  - Total: 0.95 sq mi (2.46 km^{2})
  - Land: 0.95 sq mi (2.46 km^{2})
  - Water: 0 sq mi (0.00 km^{2}) 0.00%
- Elevation: 387 ft (118 m)

Population (2020)
  - Total: 399
  - Density: 420.5/sq mi (162.37/km^{2})
- Time zone: UTC−05:00 (Eastern (EST))
  - Summer (DST): UTC−04:00 (EDT)
- Area code: 908
- FIPS code: 34-52050
- GNIS feature ID: 02584014

New Village is an unincorporated community and census-designated place (CDP) located within Franklin Township in Warren County, New Jersey, United States, that was created as part of the 2010 United States census. As of the 2020 census, New Village had a population of 399.

== Geography ==
According to the United States Census Bureau, the CDP had a total area of 0.949 square miles (2.457 km^{2}), all of which was land.

== Demographics ==
Historical population
Census	Pop.	Note	%±
2010	421		—
2020	399		−5.2%
U.S. Decennial Census; 2010 2020

New Village first appeared as a census designated place in the 2010 U.S. census.

=== 2020 census ===
New Village CDP, New Jersey – Racial and ethnic composition Note: the US Census treats Hispanic/Latino as an ethnic category. This table excludes Latinos from the racial categories and assigns them to a separate category. Hispanics/Latinos may be of any race.
Race / Ethnicity (NH = Non-Hispanic)	Pop 2010	Pop 2020	% 2010	% 2020
White alone (NH)	396	354	94.06%	88.72%
Black or African American alone (NH)	1	6	0.24%	1.50%
Native American or Alaska Native alone (NH)	1	0	0.24%	0.00%
Asian alone (NH)	5	8	1.19%	2.01%
Native Hawaiian or Pacific Islander alone (NH)	0	0	0.00%	0.00%
Other race alone (NH)	0	0	0.00%	0.00%
Mixed race or Multiracial (NH)	8	5	1.90%	1.25%
Hispanic or Latino (any race)	10	26	2.38%	6.52%
Total	421	399	100.00%	100.00%

=== 2010 census ===
The 2010 United States census counted 421 people, 161 households, and 117 families in the CDP. The population density was 443.7 per square mile (171.3/km^{2}). There were 180 housing units at an average density of 189.7 per square mile (73.2/km^{2}). The racial makeup was 96.44% (406) White, 0.24% (1) Black or African American, 0.24% (1) Native American, 1.19% (5) Asian, 0.00% (0) Pacific Islander, 0.00% (0) from other races, and 1.90% (8) from two or more races. Hispanic or Latino of any race were 2.38% (10) of the population.

Of the 161 households, 26.1% had children under the age of 18; 68.9% were married couples living together; 1.9% had a female householder with no husband present and 27.3% were non-families. Of all households, 23.6% were made up of individuals and 6.8% had someone living alone who was 65 years of age or older. The average household size was 2.61 and the average family size was 3.15.

20.9% of the population were under the age of 18, 6.7% from 18 to 24, 23.8% from 25 to 44, 30.6% from 45 to 64, and 18.1% who were 65 years of age or older. The median age was 43.8 years. For every 100 females, the population had 101.4 males. For every 100 females ages 18 and older there were 100.6 males.

== Edison Portland Cement ==
The Edison Portland Cement Company, a venture of Thomas Edison, was founded in New Village in 1899. It went on to supply the concrete for the construction of Yankee Stadium in 1922. The company went bankrupt in the 1920s.

== Notable people ==
People who were born in, residents of, or otherwise closely associated with New Village include:

- Pete Perini (1928-2008), fullback who played two seasons in the National Football League with the Chicago Bears and Cleveland Browns.
