= St. Luke's Episcopal Church (Hope, New Jersey) =

Historic church in New Jersey, United States

- U.S. National Register of Historic Places
- U.S. Historic district – Contributing property
- New Jersey Register of Historic Places
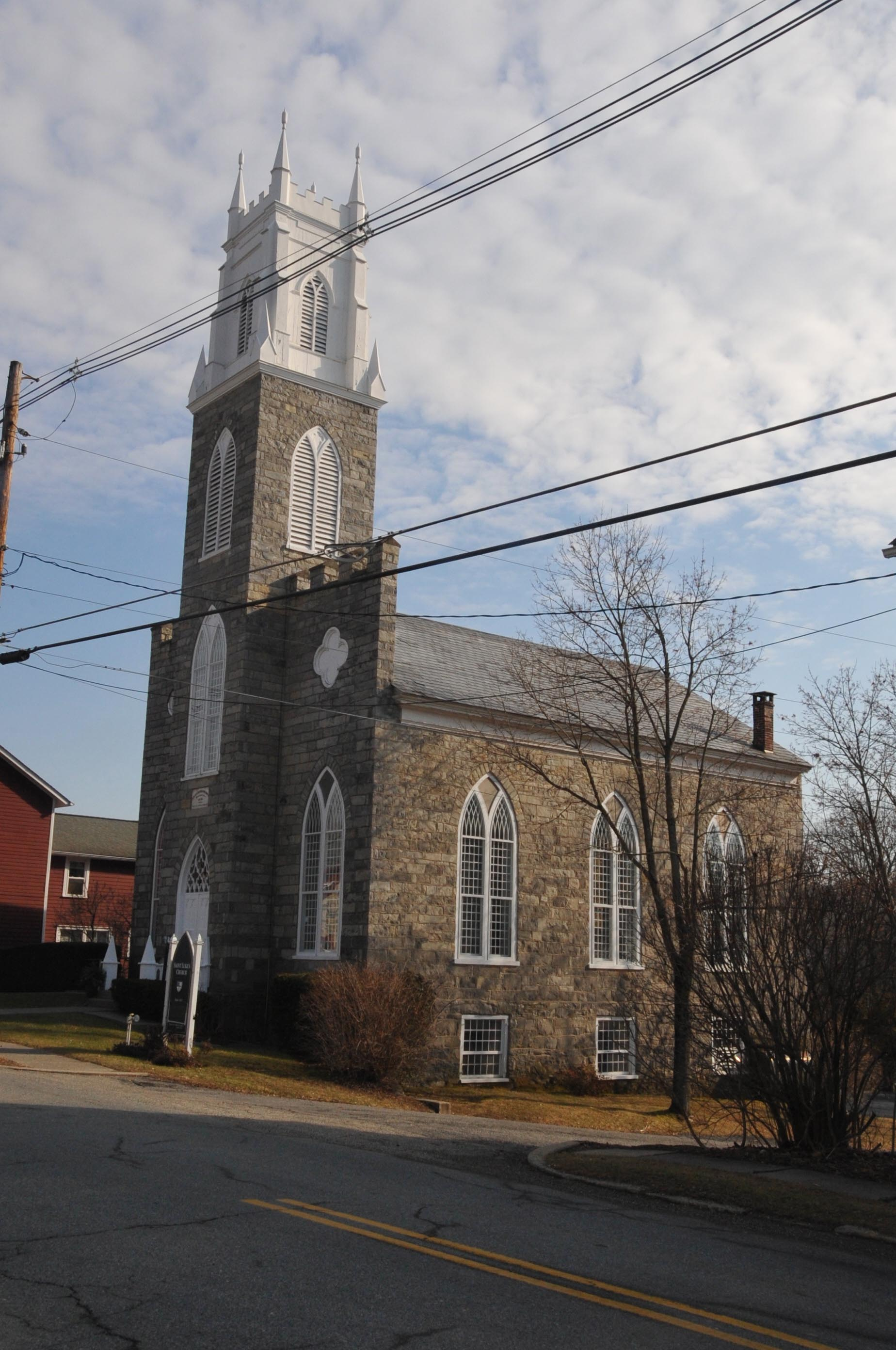
- St. Luke's Episcopal Church, built 1832–1839

- Location within Warren County, New Jersey Location within New Jersey Location within the United States
- Location: 346 High Street, Hope Township, New Jersey
- Coordinates: 40°54′37.5″N 74°58′7.6″W
- Built: 1839
- Architect: William Bulgin
- Architectural style: Gothic Revival
- Part of: Hope Historic District (ID73001138)
- NRHP reference No.: 07000151
- NJRHP No.: 4707

Significant dates
- Added to NRHP: March 16, 2007
- Designated CP: July 20, 1973
- Designated NJRHP: January 11, 2007

St. Luke's Episcopal Church is a historic Episcopal church building located at 346 High Street in the Hope section of Hope Township in Warren County, New Jersey, United States. Built from 1832 to 1839, it was documented by the Historic American Buildings Survey (HABS) in 1937. The stone church was added to the National Register of Historic Places on March 16, 2007, for its significance in architecture and religion. It had been previously added as a contributing property to the Hope Historic District on July 20, 1973.

== History and description ==
The congregation was formed in 1828. Construction of the church began in 1832, and was completed in 1839, with its consecration on October 12, 1839. The architect William Bulgin designed the building with early Gothic Revival style and built it using limestone.

The church is administered by the Episcopal Church of St. Luke and St. Mary, formed by the January 2016 merger of the former parish of St. Luke's with St. Mary's in Belvidere.

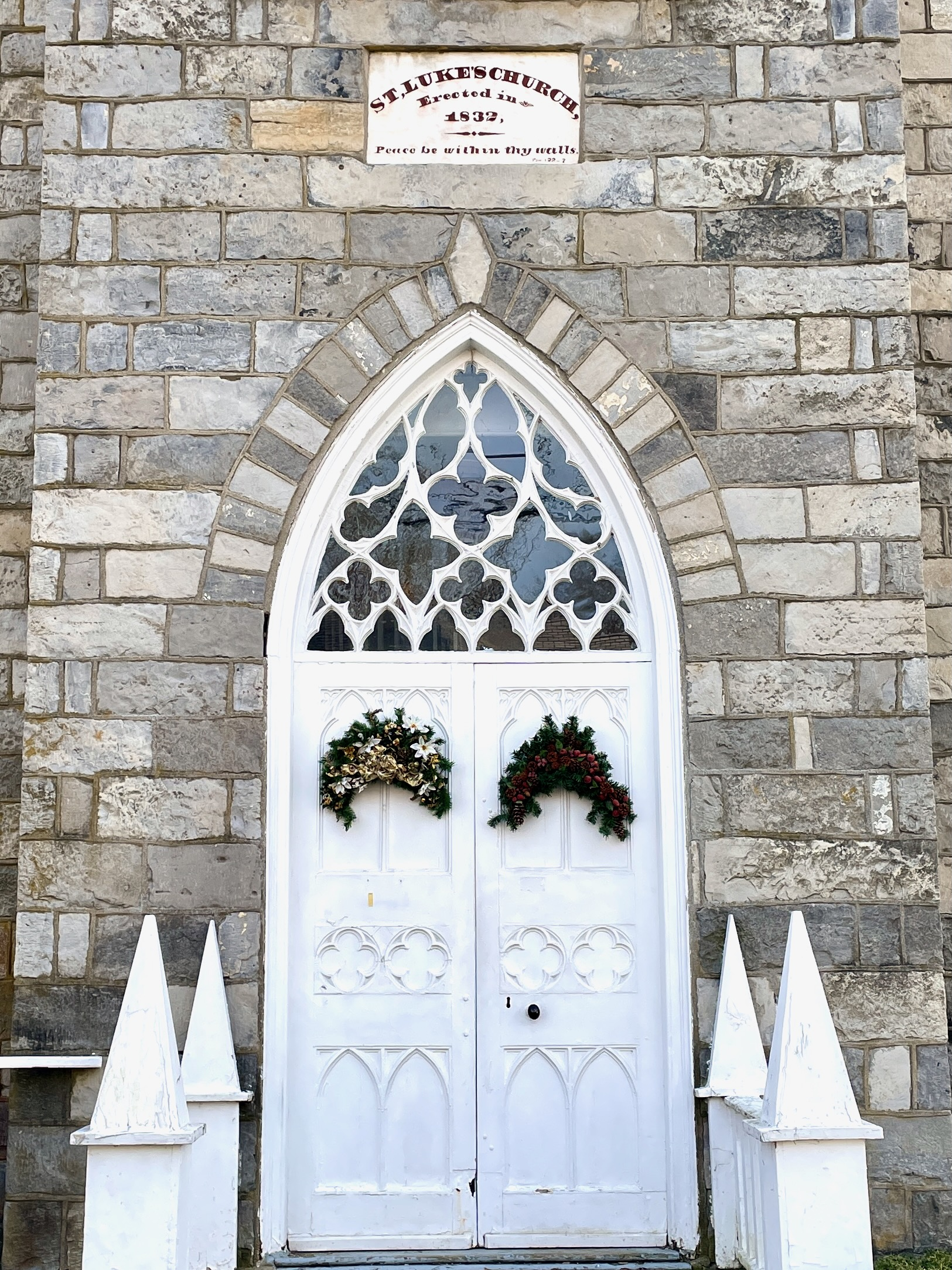
Entrance with 1832 datestone

== See also ==
- National Register of Historic Places listings in Warren County, New Jersey
