= Mount Hermon, New Jersey =

Populated place in Warren County, New Jersey, US

- Census-designated place
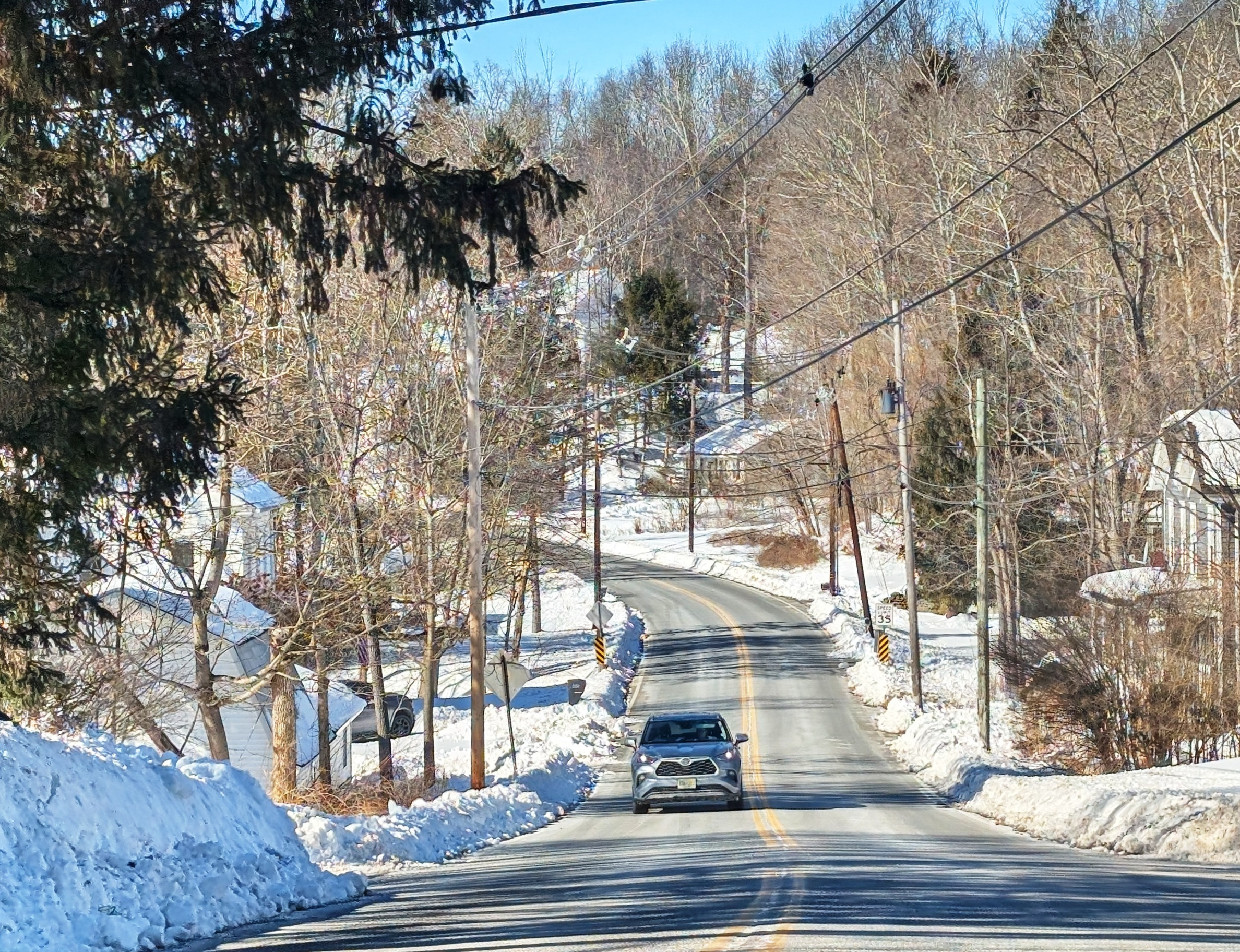
- CR 655 in Mount Hermon

- Location in Warren County Location in New Jersey Location in the United States
- Coordinates: 40.927747°N 74.99027°W
- Country: United States
- State: New Jersey
- County: Warren
- Township: Hope

Area
  - Total: 0.98 sq mi (2.54 km^{2})
  - Land: 0.93 sq mi (2.42 km^{2})
  - Water: 0.046 sq mi (0.12 km^{2}) 2.48%
- Elevation: 472 ft (144 m)

Population (2020)
  - Total: 172
  - Density: 184.4/sq mi (71.18/km^{2})
- Time zone: UTC−05:00 (Eastern (EST))
  - Summer (DST): UTC−04:00 (EDT)
- Area code: 908
- FIPS code: 34-48840
- GNIS feature ID: 02584013

Mount Hermon is an unincorporated community and census-designated place (CDP) located within Hope Township in Warren County, in the U.S. state of New Jersey, that was defined as part of the 2010 United States census. As of the 2020 census, Mount Hermon had a population of 172.

== Geography ==
According to the United States Census Bureau, the CDP had a total area of 0.474 square miles (1.227 km^{2}), including 0.462 square miles (1.197 km^{2}) of land and 0.012 square miles (0.030 km^{2}) of water (2.48%).

== Demographics ==
Historical population
Census	Pop.	Note	%±
2010	141		—
2020	172		22.0%
U.S. Decennial Census; 2010 2020

Mount Hermon first appeared as a census designated place in the 2010 U.S. census.

=== 2020 census ===
Mount Hermon CDP, New Jersey – Racial and ethnic composition Note: the US Census treats Hispanic/Latino as an ethnic category. This table excludes Latinos from the racial categories and assigns them to a separate category. Hispanics/Latinos may be of any race.
Race / Ethnicity (NH = Non-Hispanic)	Pop 2010	Pop 2020	% 2010	% 2020
White alone (NH)	134	153	95.04%	88.95%
Black or African American alone (NH)	1	0	0.71%	0.00%
Native American or Alaska Native alone (NH)	0	0	0.00%	0.00%
Asian alone (NH)	3	3	2.13%	1.74%
Native Hawaiian or Pacific Islander alone (NH)	0	0	0.00%	0.00%
Other race alone (NH)	0	0	0.00%	0.00%
Mixed race or Multiracial (NH)	1	2	0.71%	1.16%
Hispanic or Latino (any race)	2	14	1.42%	8.14%
Total	141	172	100.00%	100.00%

=== 2010 census ===
The 2010 United States census counted 141 people, 50 households, and 38 families in the CDP. The population density was 305.1 per square mile (117.8/km^{2}). There were 54 housing units at an average density of 116.9 per square mile (45.1/km^{2}). The racial makeup was 95.74% (135) White, 0.71% (1) Black or African American, 0.00% (0) Native American, 2.13% (3) Asian, 0.00% (0) Pacific Islander, 0.71% (1) from other races, and 0.71% (1) from two or more races. Hispanic or Latino of any race were 1.42% (2) of the population.

Of the 50 households, 32.0% had children under the age of 18; 66.0% were married couples living together; 6.0% had a female householder with no husband present and 24.0% were non-families. Of all households, 20.0% were made up of individuals and 10.0% had someone living alone who was 65 years of age or older. The average household size was 2.82 and the average family size was 3.29.

25.5% of the population were under the age of 18, 7.8% from 18 to 24, 19.1% from 25 to 44, 32.6% from 45 to 64, and 14.9% who were 65 years of age or older. The median age was 43.2 years. For every 100 females, the population had 101.4 males. For every 100 females ages 18 and older there were 94.4 males.
