= Hope (CDP), New Jersey =

Populated place in Warren County, New Jersey, US

Hope, New Jersey
- Census-designated place
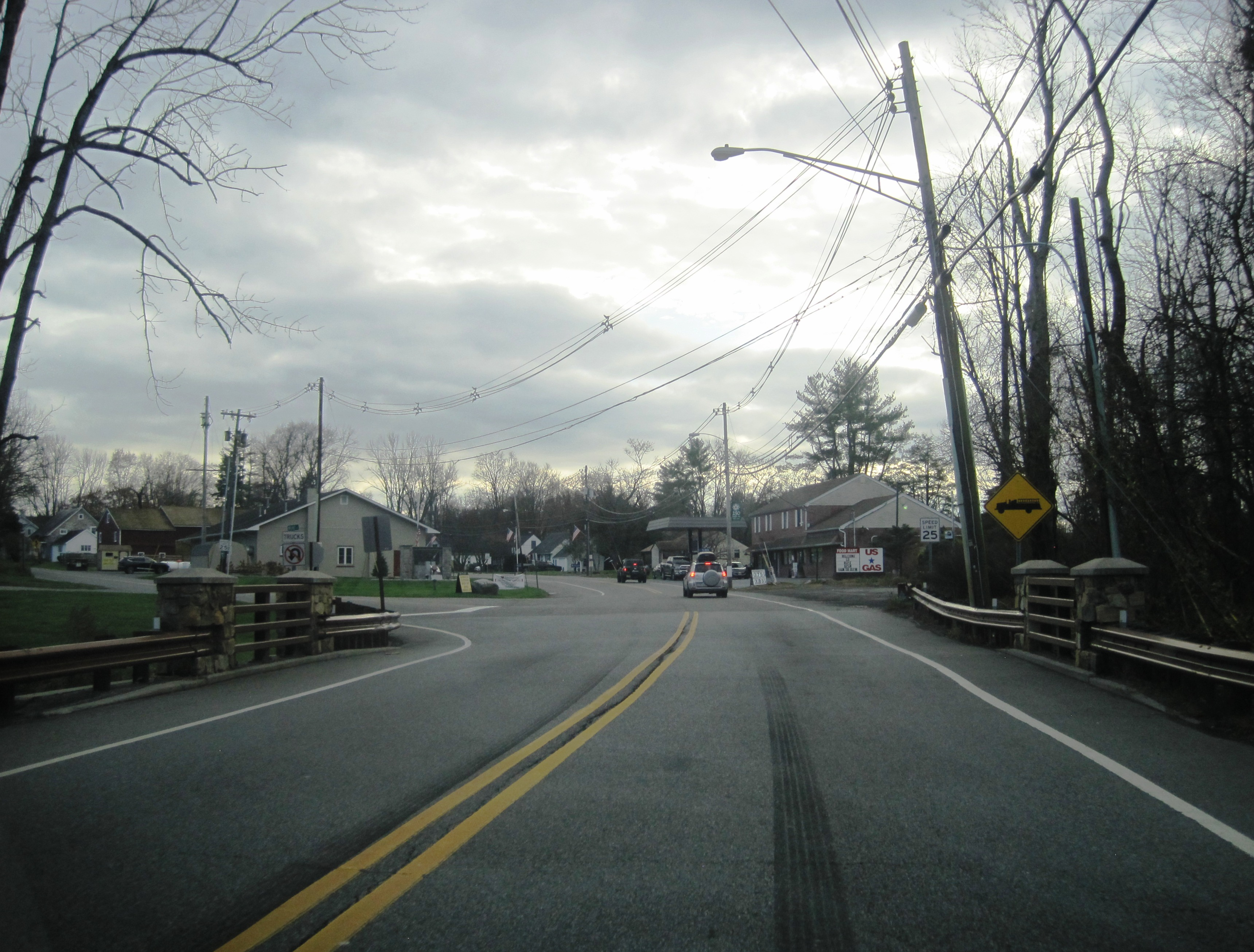
- Entering the community from southbound CR 521

- Location in Warren County Location in New Jersey Location in the United States
- Coordinates: 40.912139°N 74.95879°W
- Country: United States
- State: New Jersey
- County: Warren
- Township: Hope

Area
  - Total: 0.74 sq mi (1.91 km^{2})
  - Land: 0.73 sq mi (1.88 km^{2})
  - Water: 0.015 sq mi (0.04 km^{2}) 0.10%
- Elevation: 417 ft (127 m)

Population (2020)
  - Total: 256
  - Density: 353.0/sq mi (136.29/km^{2})
- Time zone: UTC−05:00 (Eastern (EST))
  - Summer (DST): UTC−04:00 (EDT)
- Area code: 908
- FIPS code: 34-33030
- GNIS feature ID: 02584002

Hope is an unincorporated community and census-designated place (CDP) located within Hope Township in Warren County, in the U.S. state of New Jersey, that was defined as part of the 2010 United States census. As of the 2010 Census, the CDP's population was 195.

== Geography ==
According to the United States Census Bureau, the CDP had a total area of 0.615 square miles (1.593 km^{2}), including 0.614 square miles (1.592 km^{2}) of land and 0.001 square miles (0.002 km^{2}) of water (0.10%).

== Demographics ==
Historical population
Census	Pop.	Note	%±
2010	195		—
2020	256		31.3%
U.S. Decennial Census; 2010 2020

Hope first appeared as a census designated place in the 2010 U.S. census.

=== 2020 census ===
Hope CDP, New Jersey – Racial and ethnic composition Note: the US Census treats Hispanic/Latino as an ethnic category. This table excludes Latinos from the racial categories and assigns them to a separate category. Hispanics/Latinos may be of any race.
Race / Ethnicity (NH = Non-Hispanic)	Pop 2010	Pop 2020	% 2010	% 2020
White alone (NH)	173	215	88.72%	83.98%
Black or African American alone (NH)	2	0	1.03%	0.00%
Native American or Alaska Native alone (NH)	0	0	0.00%	0.00%
Asian alone (NH)	11	2	5.64%	0.78%
Native Hawaiian or Pacific Islander alone (NH)	0	0	0.00%	0.00%
Other race alone (NH)	0	2	0.00%	0.78%
Mixed race or Multiracial (NH)	0	14	0.00%	5.47%
Hispanic or Latino (any race)	9	23	4.62%	8.98%
Total	195	256	100.00%	100.00%

=== 2010 census ===
The 2010 United States census counted 195 people, 84 households, and 54 families in the CDP. The population density was 317.3 per square mile (122.5/km^{2}). There were 102 housing units at an average density of 166.0 per square mile (64.1/km^{2}). The racial makeup was 92.31% (180) White, 1.03% (2) Black or African American, 0.00% (0) Native American, 5.64% (11) Asian, 0.00% (0) Pacific Islander, 1.03% (2) from other races, and 0.00% (0) from two or more races. Hispanic or Latino of any race were 4.62% (9) of the population.

Of the 84 households, 23.8% had children under the age of 18; 50.0% were married couples living together; 9.5% had a female householder with no husband present and 35.7% were non-families. Of all households, 23.8% were made up of individuals and 8.3% had someone living alone who was 65 years of age or older. The average household size was 2.32 and the average family size was 2.78.

20.0% of the population were under the age of 18, 7.2% from 18 to 24, 21.5% from 25 to 44, 35.9% from 45 to 64, and 15.4% who were 65 years of age or older. The median age was 45.4 years. For every 100 females, the population had 91.2 males. For every 100 females ages 18 and older there were 100.0 males.
