= Hope Historic District (Hope, New Jersey) =

- U.S. National Register of Historic Places
- U.S. Historic district
- New Jersey Register of Historic Places
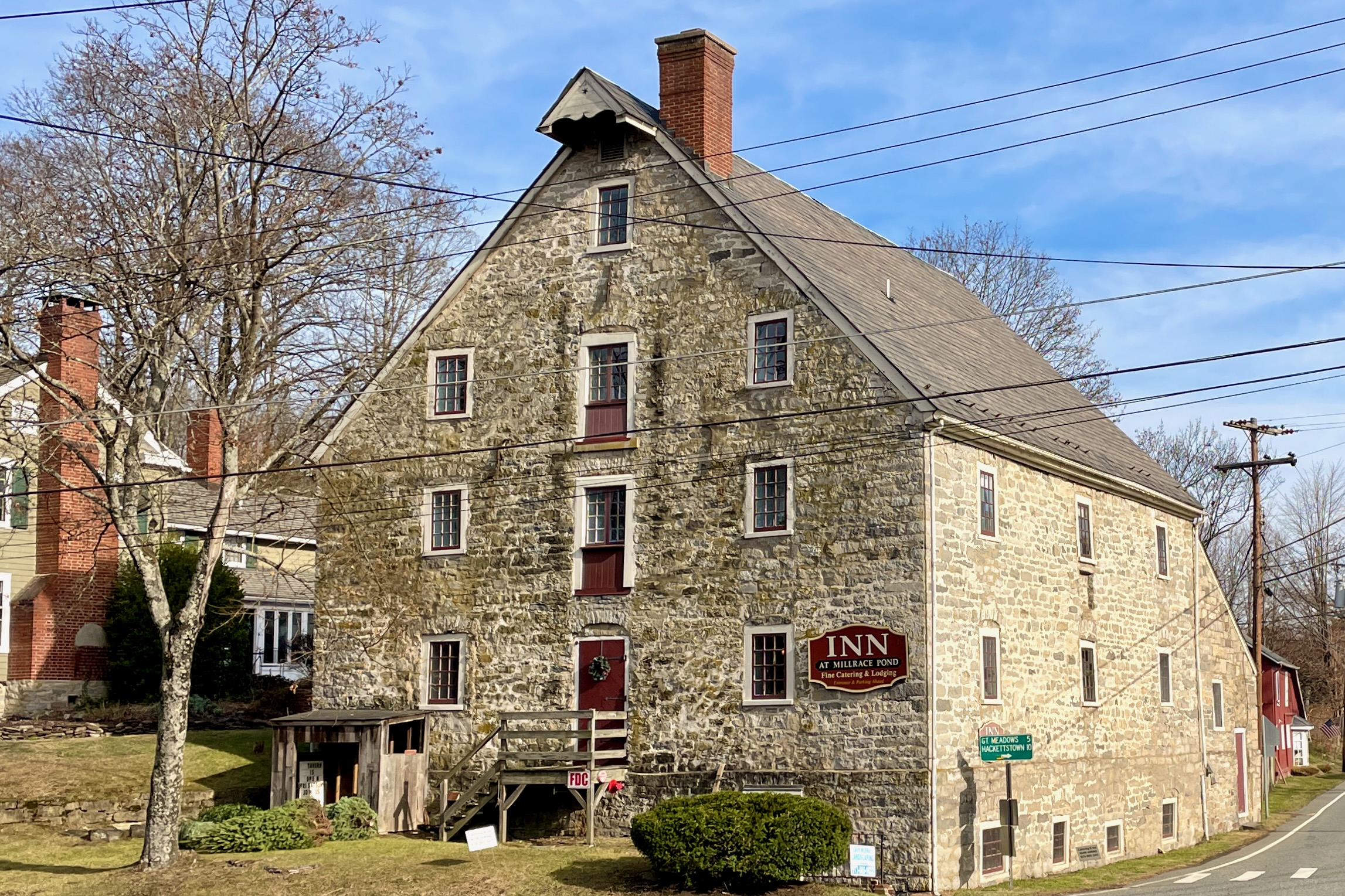
- Moravian Grist Mill, built 1770

- Location within Warren County, New Jersey Location within New Jersey Location within the United States
- Location: Union, High, Hickory and Walnut streets; County Route 521; Beaver Brook; Mill Race; and County Route 519, Hope Township, New Jersey
- Coordinates: 40°54′42″N 74°58′13″W
- Area: 40 acres (16 ha)
- NRHP reference No.: 73001138
- NJRHP No.: 2763

Significant dates
- Added to NRHP: July 20, 1973
- Designated NJRHP: June 13, 1973

The Hope Historic District is a 40-acre (16 ha) historic district encompassing the Hope section of Hope Township in Warren County, New Jersey, United States. It was added to the National Register of Historic Places on July 20, 1973, for its significance in architecture, community development, commerce, engineering, exploration/settlement, industry, and religion. The district includes 17 contributing buildings, 1 contributing site, and 1 contributing structure. St. Luke's Episcopal Church was later listed individually on the NRHP.

== History and description ==
The village was a planned community established by Moravians starting in 1769 after they purchased 1,000 acres (400 ha) from John Samuel Green, Jr. The community, previously known as Greenland, developed a detailed development plan in 1774 and was renamed Hope. The Moravian Grist Mill, built from stone in 1770, was the first permanent building in the village. It was documented by the Historic American Buildings Survey (HABS) in 1942. The mill complex is now the Inn at Millrace Pond. The Gemeinhaus or Moravian Church is a two and one-half story stone structure built in 1781. In 1824, it was Warren County's first courthouse. Since 1911, it has been the headquarters of the First Hope Bank. The American House Hotel, also known as the Single Sister Choir, is a two and one-half story fieldstone building started in 1797. Next to it is the American House Annex, also known as the John Schenk House. St. John's United Methodist Church was rebuilt in 1879 at the site of an earlier church.

== Gallery of contributing properties ==
Selected properties that are key, important to the district in terms of architecture or history, as described by the nomination form.

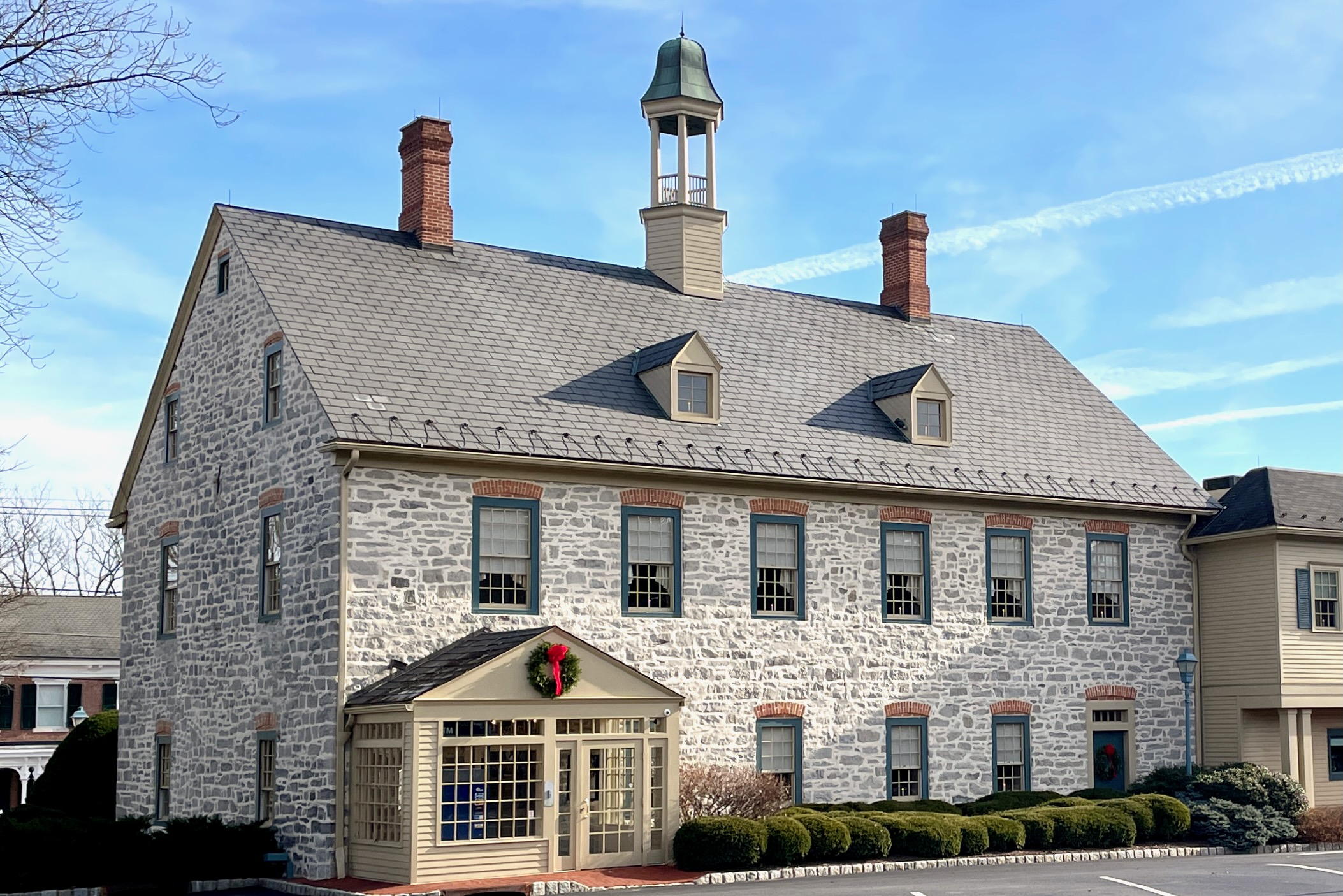
Gemeinhaus, the Moravian Church, built 1781

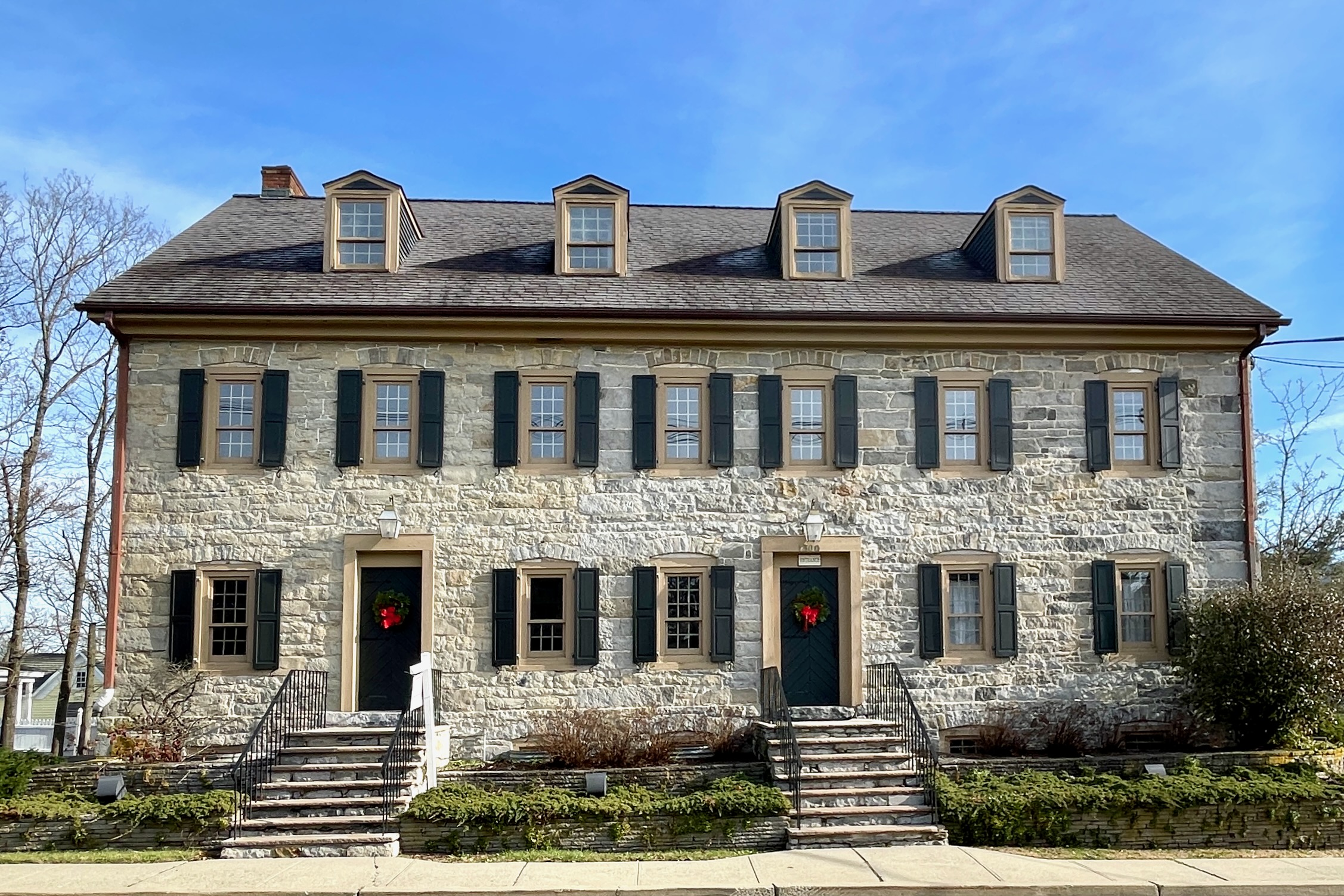
American House Hotel, also known as Single Sister Choir, built 1797

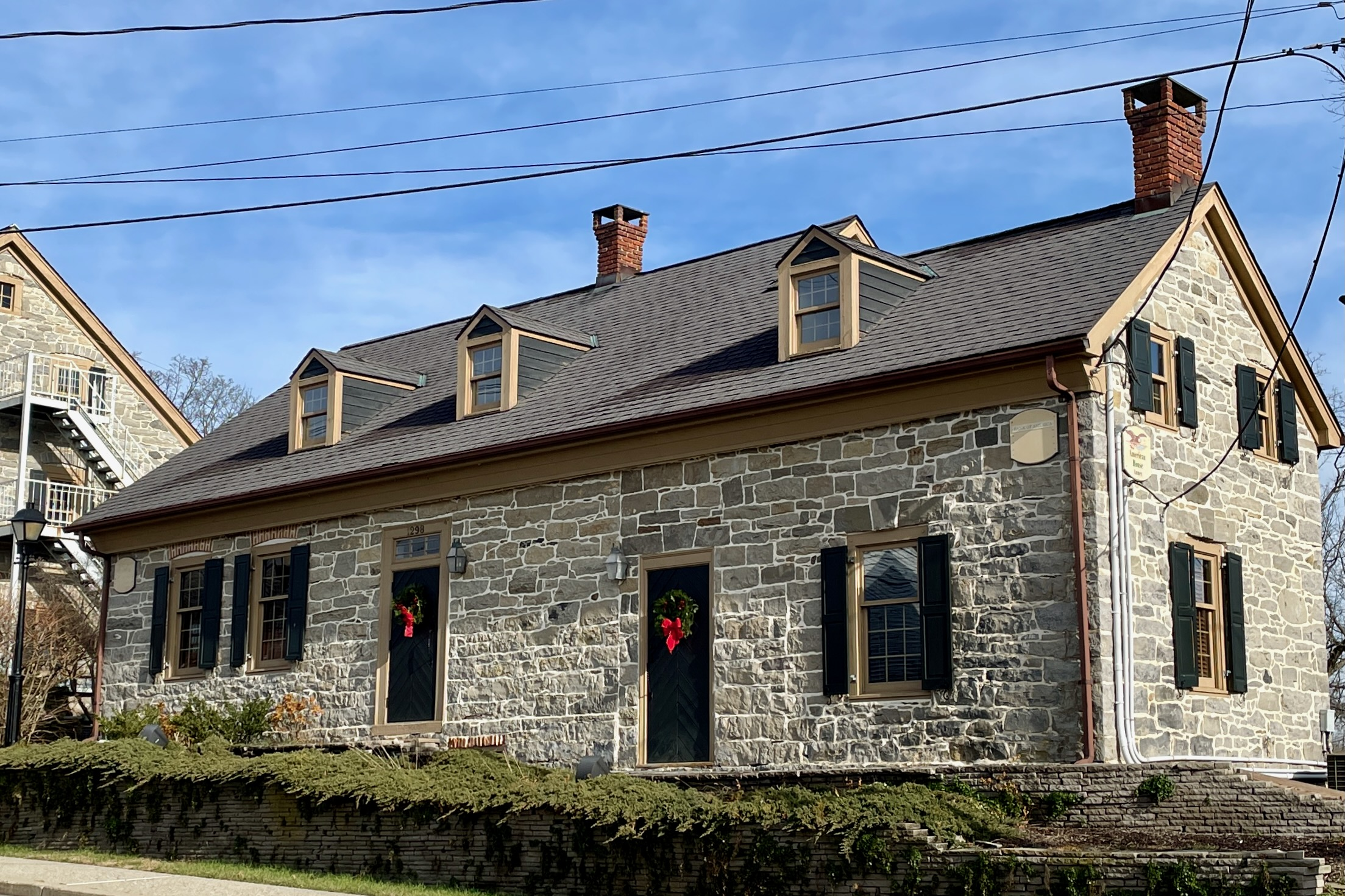
American House Annex, a Moravian stone residence

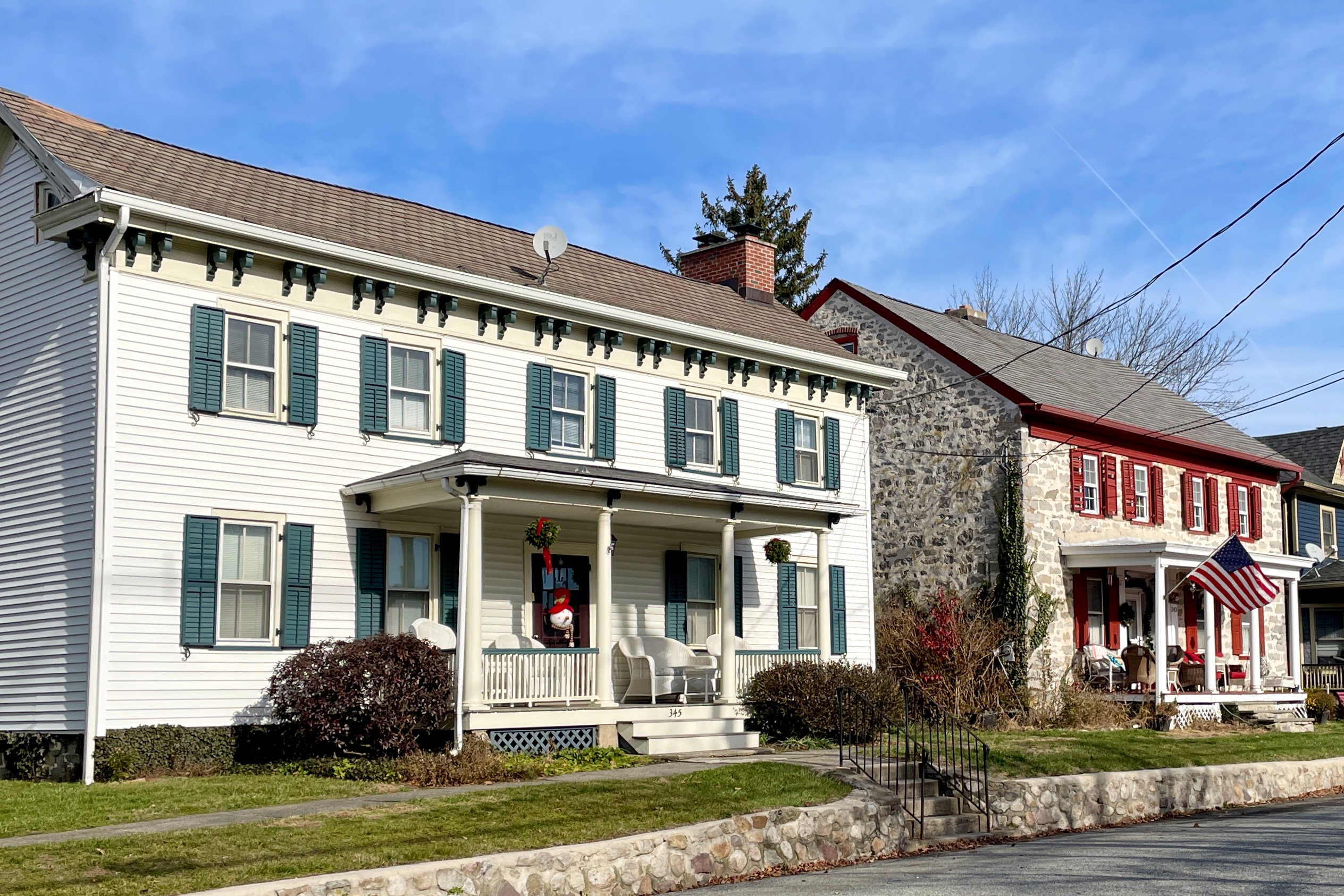
Moravian residences on High Street

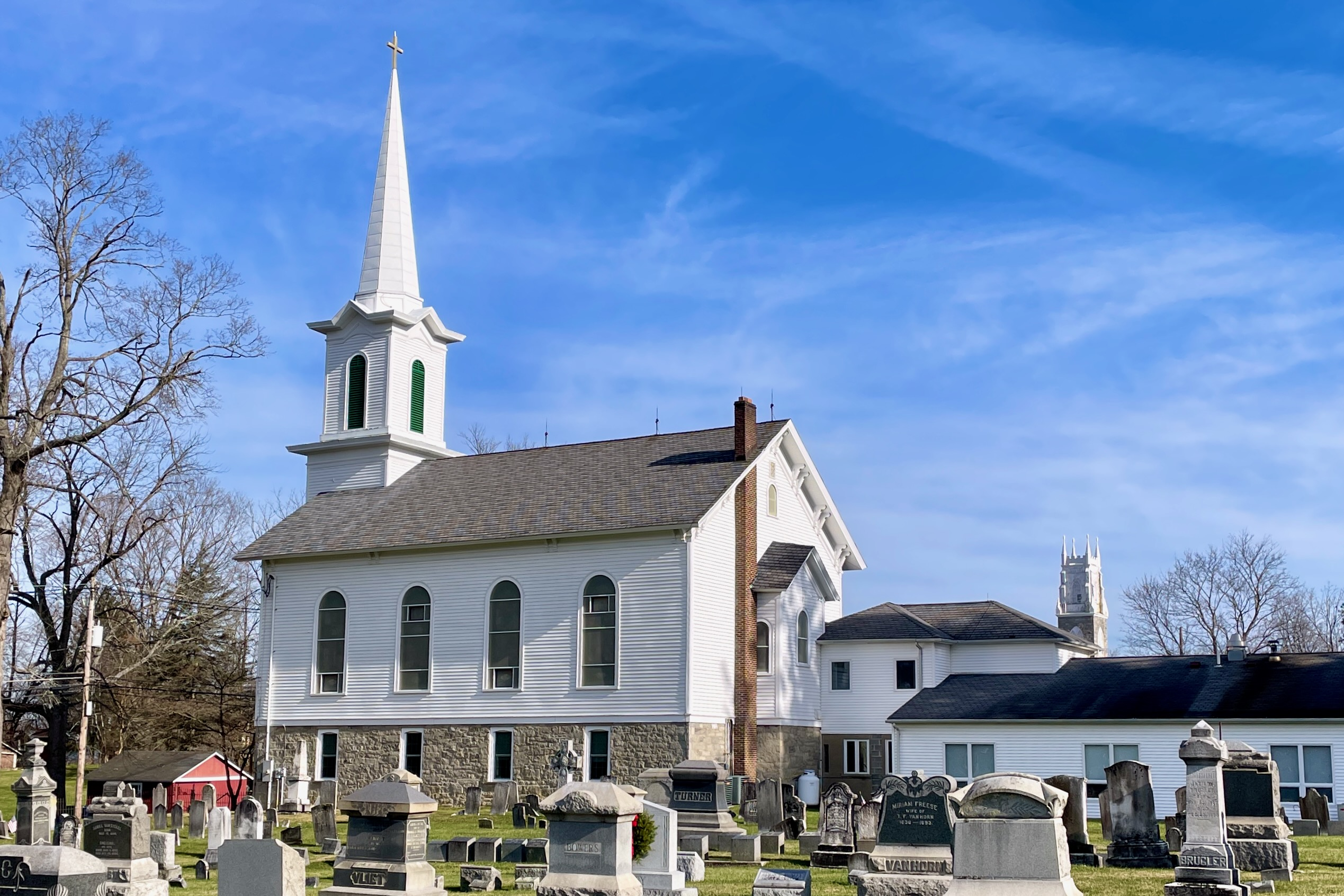
St. John's United Methodist Church, built 1879

== See also ==
- National Register of Historic Places listings in Warren County, New Jersey
