= Hope Township, New Jersey =

Township in Warren County, New Jersey, US

- Township
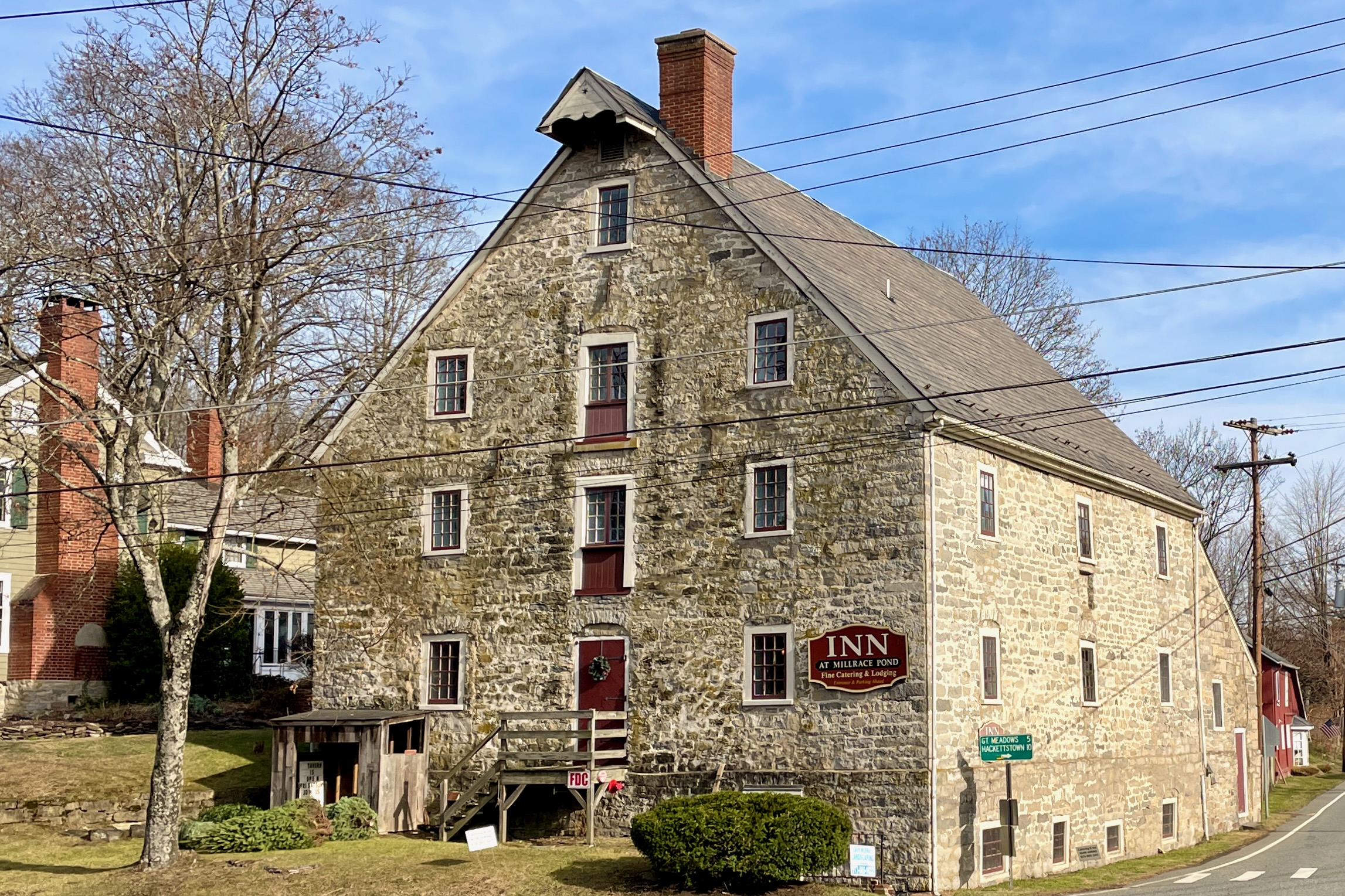
- Moravian Grist Mill in Hope, now the Inn at Millrace Pond

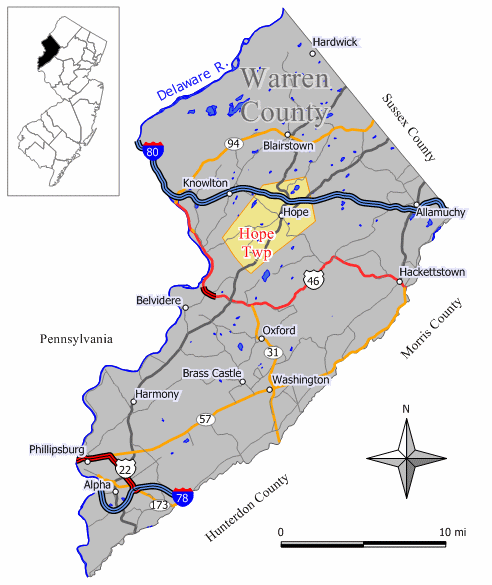
- Location of Hope Township in Warren County highlighted in yellow (right). Inset map: Location of Warren County in New Jersey highlighted in black (left).

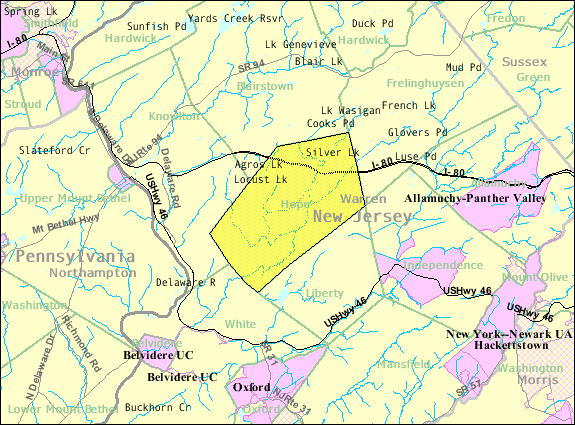
- Census Bureau map of Hope Township, New Jersey

- Location in Warren County Location in New Jersey Location in the United States
- Coordinates: 40.906979°N 74.976675°W
- Country: United States
- state: New Jersey
- County: Warren
- Incorporated: April 8, 1839

Government
  - Type: Township
  - Body: Township Committee
  - Mayor: Timothy C. McDonough (I, term ends December 31, 2023)
  - Municipal clerk: Robin Keggan

Area
  - Total: 18.29 sq mi (47.38 km^{2})
  - Land: 18.08 sq mi (46.83 km^{2})
  - Water: 0.21 sq mi (0.55 km^{2}) 1.15%
  - Rank: 155th of 565 in state 11th of 22 in county
- Elevation: 436 ft (133 m)

Population (2020)
  - Total: 1,835
  - Estimate (2023): 1,851
  - Rank: 492nd of 565 in state 21st of 22 in county
  - Density: 101.5/sq mi (39.2/km^{2})
  - Rank: 541st of 565 in state 20th of 22 in county
- Time zone: UTC−05:00 (Eastern (EST))
  - Summer (DST): UTC−04:00 (Eastern (EDT))
- ZIP Code: 07844
- Area code: 908
- FIPS code: 3404133060
- GNIS feature ID: 0882242
- Website: www.hopetwp-nj.us

Hope Township is a township in Warren County in the U.S. state of New Jersey. As of the 2020 United States census, the township's population was 1,835, a decrease of 117 (−6.0%) from the 2010 census count of 1,952, which in turn reflected an increase of 61 (+3.2%) from the 1,891 counted in the 2000 census. The 2010 population of 1,952 reflected an all-time high since the 1,903 recorded in the 1840 census, the first recorded population after the township was formed.

Hope Township was incorporated as a township by an act of the New Jersey Legislature on April 8, 1839, from portions of Knowlton Township and Oxford Township, based on the results of a referendum held that day. Liberty Township was created on March 25, 1926, from portions of the township.

== History ==
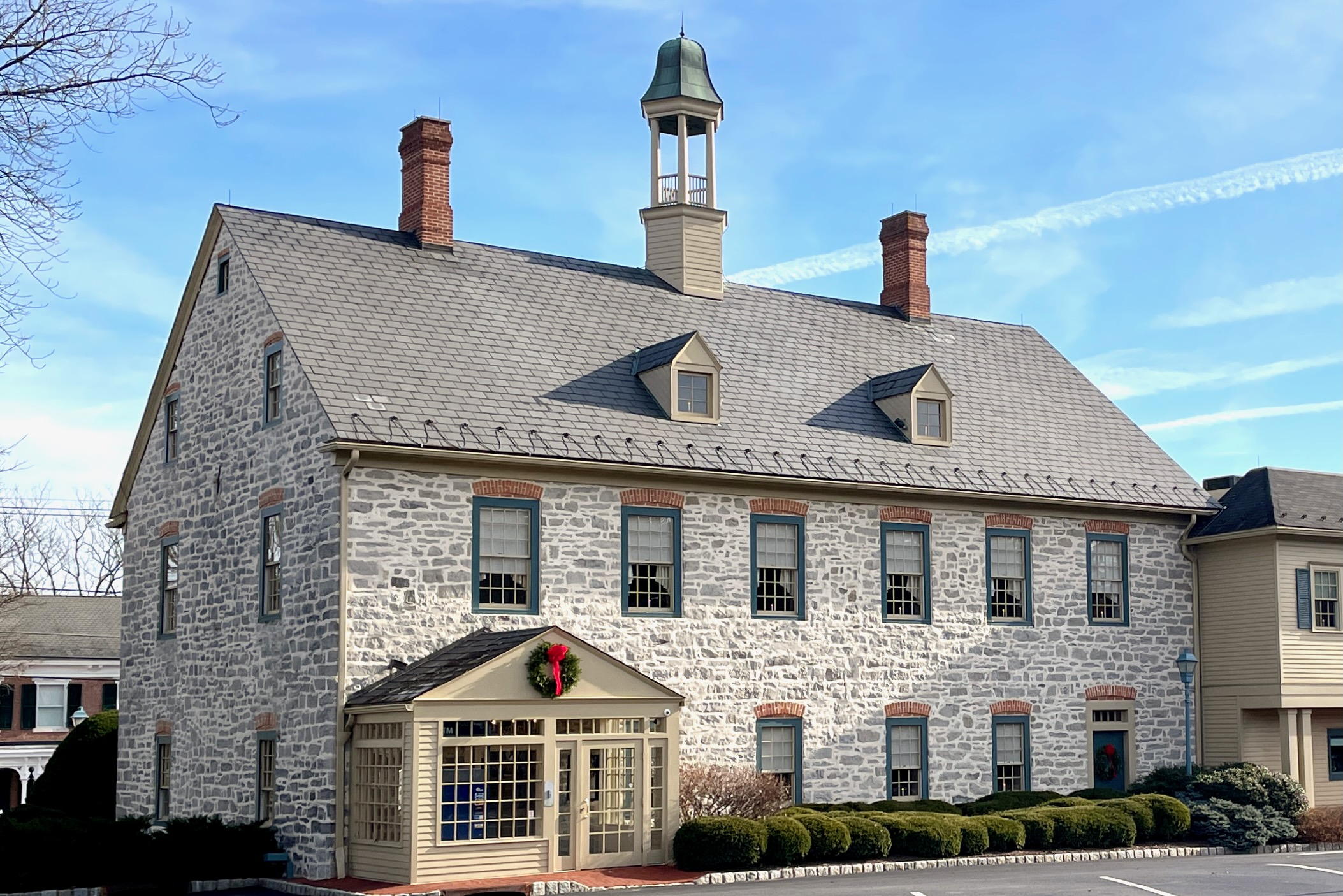
Moravian Church in Hope, now headquarters of the First Hope Bank.

Hope Township is one of the earliest planned communities in the United States, having been established by German Moravians in 1769. Early planning maps detail planned locations of streets, homes, wells, businesses, farms, a school, tavern, and church.

Prior to the arrival of the Moravians, there was no distinct town, but several families farmed on Jenny Jump Mountain, to the south of Hope, in surrounding area and on John Samuel Green Jr.'s farm in the center of what is now the Village. Throughout the 1760s, Moravians from Bethlehem, Pennsylvania traveled through this area on their way to New England to establish new communities. They lodged overnight with the Green Family who were impressed with their religion and way of life.

The Moravians were a religious group whose formal name was the "Unitas Fratrum" or Unity of the Brethren. They were followers of Jan Hus, the reformer from Prague who protested against the Roman Catholic Church in 1415 and was finally burned at the stake for his rebellion. These followers continued to practice his views in Moravia and Bohemia in what is now the Czech Republic, hence the common name "The Moravians". In the late 17th century this group began to be persecuted and sought shelter away from Bohemia. Count Nicolas Ludwig von Zinzendorf offered them refuge on his lands east of Dresden, Germany, and provided a base for them to regroup and pursue their religion. That settlement which remains as the center of the worldwide Moravian religion is called Herrnhut or "The Lord's Watch" inhabitants were not only "under the Lord's watchful care" but were also to be "on watch for the Lord". With the support of Count von Zinzendorf, the Church established over 200 missionary settlements.

After a formal survey of the village completed on November 26, 1774, the community was officially accepted by The Moravian Church and the name was changed by drawing lots on February 8, 1775, from Greenland to Hope. The name derives from the "hope of immortality" of the early Moravian settlers.

After almost 40 years of the Moravian "experiment" in Hope, the community was sold and almost all of the Moravians returned to Bethlehem or Nazareth, Pennsylvania. The basic reason for closing the community was that it was never self-supporting and had declined from its height of population of 147 to under 100 people by the early 19th century. The Church in Germany could no longer subsidize such a small village. Moravians worldwide were selling possessions and even some other entire communities to pay off debts incurred years earlier by Count von Zinzendorf, who heavily mortgaged his lands to give them opportunity back in Germany. Disease and a competitive gristmill also contributed to Moravian Hope's decline.

== Geography ==
According to the U.S. Census Bureau, the township had a total area of 18.29 square miles (47.38 km^{2}), including 18.08 square miles (46.83 km^{2}) of land and 0.21 square miles (0.55 km^{2}) of water (1.15%). The township is located in the Kittatinny Valley, which is a section of the Great Appalachian Valley that stretches 700 miles (1,100 km) from Canada to Alabama.

Hope CDP (with a 2020 population of 256), Mount Hermon (172) and Silver Lake (368) are unincorporated communities and census-designated places (CDPs) located within the township.

Other unincorporated communities, localities and place names located partially or completely within the township include:

- Feebletown
- Locust Lake
- Mount Herman
- Swayzes Mill

The township borders the Warren County municipalities of Blairstown Township, Frelinghuysen Township, Knowlton Township, Liberty Township and White Township.

== Demographics ==
Historical population
Census	Pop.	Note	%±
1840	1,903		—
1850	1,755		−7.8%
1860	1,789		1.9%
1870	1,542		−13.8%
1880	1,569		1.8%
1890	1,332		−15.1%
1900	1,144		−14.1%
1910	1,119		−2.2%
1920	948		−15.3%
1930	553	*	−41.7%
1940	646		16.8%
1950	681		5.4%
1960	833		22.3%
1970	1,140		36.9%
1980	1,468		28.8%
1990	1,719		17.1%
2000	1,891		10.0%
2010	1,952		3.2%
2020	1,835		−6.0%
2023 (est.)	1,851	▲	0.9%
Population sources: 1840–1920 1840 1850–1870; 1850 1870 1880–1890; 1890–1910 1910–1930; 1940–2000 2000; 2010 2020 * = Lost territory in previous decade.

The township's economic data (as is all of Warren County) is included by the US Census Bureau as part of the Allentown-Bethlehem-Easton, PA-NJ Metropolitan Statistical Area.

=== 2010 census ===
The 2010 United States census counted 1,952 people, 741 households, and 558 families in the township. The population density was 104.8 per square mile (40.5/km^{2}). There were 809 housing units at an average density of 43.4 per square mile (16.8/km^{2}). The racial makeup was 96.21% (1,878) White, 1.18% (23) Black or African American, 0.00% (0) Native American, 1.59% (31) Asian, 0.00% (0) Pacific Islander, 0.41% (8) from other races, and 0.61% (12) from two or more races. Hispanic or Latino of any race were 4.10% (80) of the population.

Of the 741 households, 29.8% had children under the age of 18; 62.2% were married couples living together; 8.5% had a female householder with no husband present and 24.7% were non-families. Of all households, 19.6% were made up of individuals and 7.7% had someone living alone who was 65 years of age or older. The average household size was 2.63 and the average family size was 3.03.

22.6% of the population were under the age of 18, 6.9% from 18 to 24, 20.1% from 25 to 44, 35.7% from 45 to 64, and 14.7% who were 65 years of age or older. The median age was 45.2 years. For every 100 females, the population had 97.2 males. For every 100 females ages 18 and older there were 97.8 males.

The Census Bureau's 2006–2010 American Community Survey showed that (in 2010 inflation-adjusted dollars) median household income was $75,107 (with a margin of error of +/− $5,302) and the median family income was $81,204 (+/− $7,973). Males had a median income of $59,141 (+/− $10,502) versus $52,574 (+/− $25,011) for females. The per capita income for the borough was $29,283 (+/− $2,988). About 4.8% of families and 5.7% of the population were below the poverty line, including 7.3% of those under age 18 and 0.8% of those age 65 or over.

=== 2000 census ===
As of the 2000 U.S. census, there were 1,891 people, 697 households, and 538 families residing in the township. The population density was 102.2 inhabitants per square mile (39.5/km^{2}). There were 747 housing units at an average density of 40.4 per square mile (15.6/km^{2}). The racial makeup of the township was 98.25% White, 0.42% African American, 0.42% Asian, 0.05% from other races, and 0.85% from two or more races. Hispanic or Latino of any race were 1.48% of the population.

There were 697 households, out of which 36.9% had children under the age of 18 living with them, 68.3% were married couples living together, 5.7% had a female householder with no husband present, and 22.7% were non-families. 19.7% of all households were made up of individuals, and 6.7% had someone living alone who was 65 years of age or older. The average household size was 2.71 and the average family size was 3.12.

In the township the population was spread out, with 26.4% under the age of 18, 4.7% from 18 to 24, 29.7% from 25 to 44, 28.1% from 45 to 64, and 11.0% who were 65 years of age or older. The median age was 40 years. For every 100 females, there were 100.3 males. For every 100 females age 18 and over, there were 94.8 males.

The median income for a household in the township was $61,319, and the median income for a family was $68,750. Males had a median income of $48,750 versus $34,038 for females. The per capita income for the township was $27,902. About 1.1% of families and 1.9% of the population were below the poverty line, including 1.6% of those under age 18 and 2.5% of those age 65 or over.

== Government ==
=== Local government ===
Hope Township is governed under the Township form of New Jersey municipal government, one of 141 municipalities (of the 564) statewide that use this form, the second-most commonly used form of government in the state. The governing body is comprised of a three-member Township Committee, whose members are elected directly by the voters at-large in partisan elections to serve three-year terms of office on a staggered basis, with one seat coming up for election each year as part of the November general election in a three-year cycle. At an annual reorganization meeting, the Township Committee selects one of its members to serve as Mayor and another as Deputy Mayor, each serving in that role for one year.

As of 2022, the Hope Township Committee is comprised of Mayor Timothy C. McDonough (I, term on committee ends December 31, 2024; term as mayor ends 2022), Deputy Mayor C. John Kruk (R, term on committee and as deputy mayor ends 2022) and Terry Urfer (R, 2023).

Constitutional officers are township clerk, Robin Keggan; chief financial officer, Kathleen Reinalda; tax collector, Stephen Lance; and tax assessor, Richard Motyka.

=== Federal, state, and county representation ===
Hope Township is located in the 7th Congressional District and is part of New Jersey's 23rd state legislative district.

For the 119th United States Congress, New Jersey's 7th congressional district is represented by Thomas Kean Jr. (R, Westfield). New Jersey is represented in the United States Senate by Democrats Cory Booker (Newark, term ends 2027) and Andy Kim (Moorestown, term ends 2031).

For the 2026–2027 session, the 23rd legislative district of the New Jersey Legislature is represented in the State Senate by Doug Steinhardt (R, Lopatcong Township) and in the General Assembly by John DiMaio (R, Hackettstown) and Erik Peterson (R, Franklin Township).

Warren County is governed by a three-member Board of County Commissioners, who are chosen at-large on a staggered basis in partisan elections with one seat coming up for election each year as part of the November general election. At an annual reorganization meeting held in the beginning of January, the board selects one of its members to serve as Commissioner Director and other as Deputy Director. As of 2025, Warren County's Commissioners are:

Deputy Director Jason J. Sarnoski (R, Lopatcong Township; 2025), Lori Ciesla (R, Lopatcong Township; 2026), and Director James R. Kern III (R, Pohatcong Township; 2027).

Constitutional officers of Warren County are: Clerk Holly Mackey (R, Alpha; 2027), Sheriff James McDonald Sr. (R, Phillipsburg; 2025) and Surrogate Michael J. Doherty (R, Washington; 2025).

=== Politics ===
As of March 2011, there were a total of 1,317 registered voters in Hope Township, of which 248 (18.8% vs. 21.5% countywide) were registered as Democrats, 523 (39.7% vs. 35.3%) were registered as Republicans and 545 (41.4% vs. 43.1%) were registered as Unaffiliated. There was one voter registered to another party. Among the township's 2010 Census population, 67.5% (vs. 62.3% in Warren County) were registered to vote, including 87.2% of those ages 18 and over (vs. 81.5% countywide).

Gubernatorial election results for Hope Township
Year	Republican		Democratic		Third party(ies)	
Year	No.	%	No.	%	No.	%
2025	571	63.73%	322	35.94%	3	0.33%
2021	562	70.60%	222	27.89%	12	1.51%
2017	489	69.56%	176	25.04%	38	5.41%
2013	437	77.62%	113	20.07%	13	2.31%
2009	467	70.44%	142	21.42%	54	8.14%
2005	396	62.76%	206	32.65%	29	4.60%

In the 2012 presidential election, Republican Mitt Romney received 566 votes (60.5% vs. 56.0% countywide), ahead of Democrat Barack Obama with 337 votes (36.0% vs. 40.8%) and other candidates with 20 votes (2.1% vs. 1.7%), among the 936 ballots cast by the township's 1,321 registered voters, for a turnout of 70.9% (vs. 66.7% in Warren County). In the 2008 presidential election, Republican John McCain received 628 votes (62.7% vs. 55.2% countywide), ahead of Democrat Barack Obama with 339 votes (33.9% vs. 41.4%) and other candidates with 15 votes (1.5% vs. 1.6%), among the 1,001 ballots cast by the township's 1,380 registered voters, for a turnout of 72.5% (vs. 73.4% in Warren County). In the 2004 presidential election, Republican George W. Bush received 641 votes (64.6% vs. 61.0% countywide), ahead of Democrat John Kerry with 324 votes (32.7% vs. 37.2%) and other candidates with 17 votes (1.7% vs. 1.3%), among the 992 ballots cast by the township's 1,279 registered voters, for a turnout of 77.6% (vs. 76.3% in the whole county).

United States presidential election results for Hope Township
Year	Republican		Democratic		Third party(ies)	
Year	No.	%	No.	%	No.	%
2024	753	64.91%	385	33.19%	22	1.90%
2020	751	63.43%	403	34.04%	30	2.53%
2016	718	67.67%	293	27.62%	50	4.71%
2012	566	61.32%	337	36.51%	20	2.17%
2008	628	63.95%	339	34.52%	15	1.53%
2004	641	65.27%	324	32.99%	17	1.73%

In the 2013 gubernatorial election, Republican Chris Christie received 77.6% of the vote (437 cast), ahead of Democrat Barbara Buono with 20.1% (113 votes), and other candidates with 2.3% (13 votes), among the 573 ballots cast by the township's 1,334 registered voters (10 ballots were spoiled), for a turnout of 43.0%. In the 2009 gubernatorial election, Republican Chris Christie received 467 votes (68.2% vs. 61.3% countywide), ahead of Democrat Jon Corzine with 142 votes (20.7% vs. 25.7%), Independent Chris Daggett with 50 votes (7.3% vs. 9.8%) and other candidates with 14 votes (2.0% vs. 1.5%), among the 685 ballots cast by the township's 1,328 registered voters, yielding a 51.6% turnout (vs. 49.6% in the county).

United States Senate election results for Hope Township1
Year	Republican		Democratic		Third party(ies)	
Year	No.	%	No.	%	No.	%
2024	738	65.19%	367	32.42%	27	2.39%
2018	550	65.95%	245	29.38%	39	4.68%
2012	533	61.26%	317	36.44%	20	2.30%
2006	396	64.29%	201	32.63%	19	3.08%

United States Senate election results for Hope Township2
Year	Republican		Democratic		Third party(ies)	
Year	No.	%	No.	%	No.	%
2020	754	64.33%	393	33.53%	25	2.13%
2014	363	67.98%	156	29.21%	15	2.81%
2013	314	71.85%	119	27.23%	4	0.92%
2008	608	64.82%	312	33.26%	18	1.92%

== Education ==
Hope Township School District serves students in pre-kindergarten through eighth grade at Hope Township Elementary School. As of the 2020–2021 school year, the district, comprised of one school, had an enrollment of 115 students and 16.2 classroom teachers (on an FTE basis), for a student–teacher ratio of 7.1:1. In the 2016–2017 school year, the district was tied for the 30th-smallest enrollment of any school district in the state.

Students in public school for ninth through twelfth grades from Harmony Township, Hope Township and White Township attend Belvidere High School in Belvidere as part of sending/receiving relationships with the Belvidere School District. As of the 2020–2021 school year, the high school had an enrollment of 367 students and 32.3 classroom teachers (on an FTE basis), for a student–teacher ratio of 11.4:1.

Students from the township and from all of Warren County are eligible to attend Ridge and Valley Charter School in Frelinghuysen Township (for grades K–8) or Warren County Technical School in Washington borough (for 9–12), with special education services provided by local districts supplemented throughout the county by the Warren County Special Services School District in Oxford Township (for Pre-K–12).

== Transportation ==
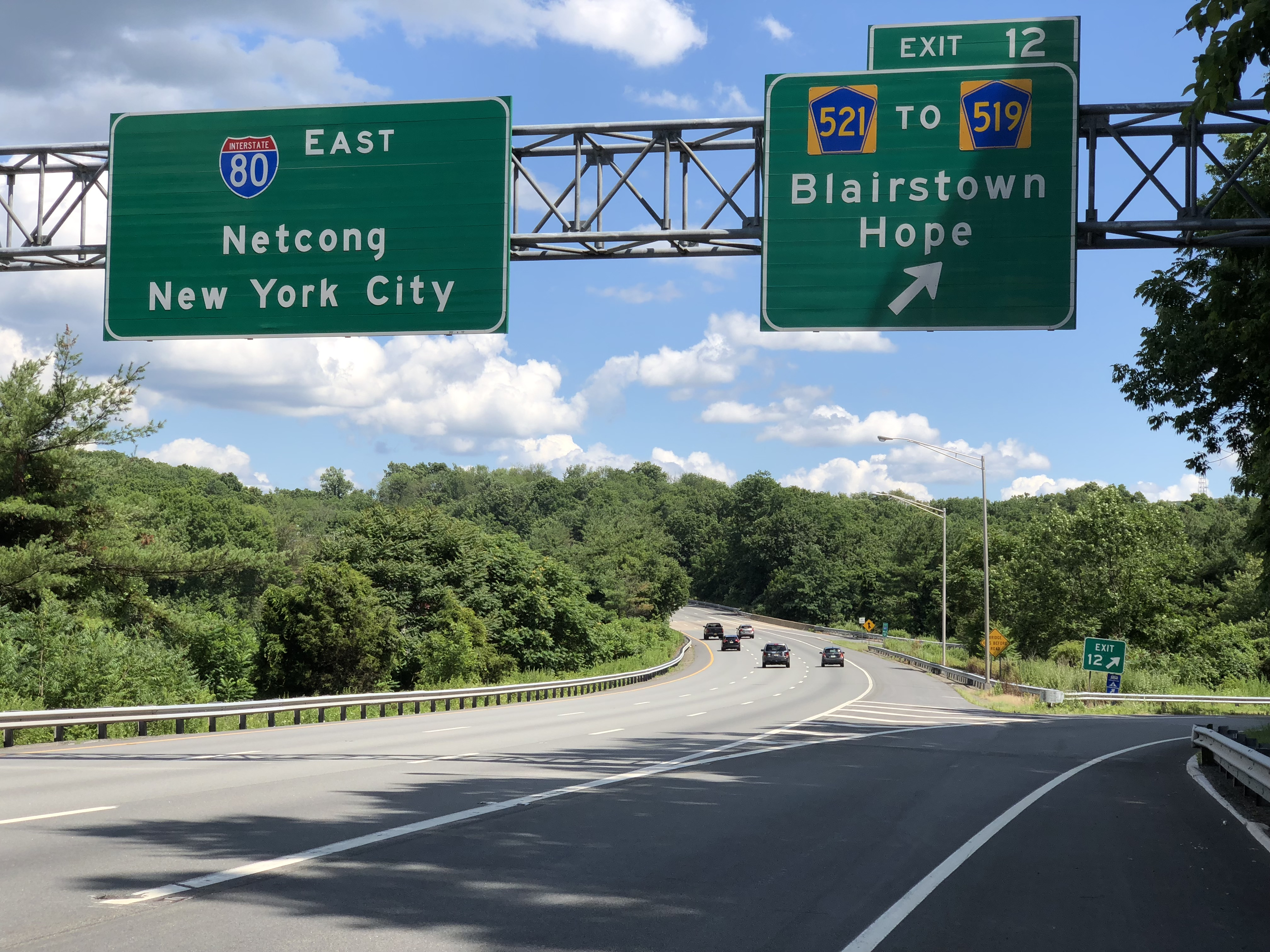
Interstate 80 eastbound in Hope Township

As of May 2010, the township had a total of 44.14 miles (71.04 km) of roadways, of which 19.30 miles (31.06 km) were maintained by the municipality, 21.42 miles (34.47 km) by Warren County and 3.42 miles (5.50 km) by the New Jersey Department of Transportation.

Interstate 80 (the Bergen-Passaic Expressway) passes through the township for 3.42 miles (5.50 km), with access via exit 12 to Hope-Blairstown Road (County Route 521). CR 521 has its southern terminus in Hope Township at an intersection with County Route 609 (High Street) and runs through the township for 2.83 miles (4.55 km). CR 519 passes through Hope for 6.33 miles (10.19 km) and can be accessed by CR 521.

== Notable people ==
People who were born in, residents of, or otherwise closely associated with Hope Township include:

- Abraham H. Albertson (1872–1964), one of Seattle's most prominent architects of the first half of the 20th century
- John Insley Blair (1802–1899), entrepreneur, railroad magnate, philanthropist and one of the 19th century's wealthiest men
- Charles Ferren Hopkins (1842–1934), the last surviving Union Civil War soldier in New Jersey that was a recipient of the Medal of Honor
- Joseph Krumgold (1908–1980), author of books and screenplays who was the first writer to win two annual Newbery Medals for the most distinguished new American children's book

== Popular culture ==
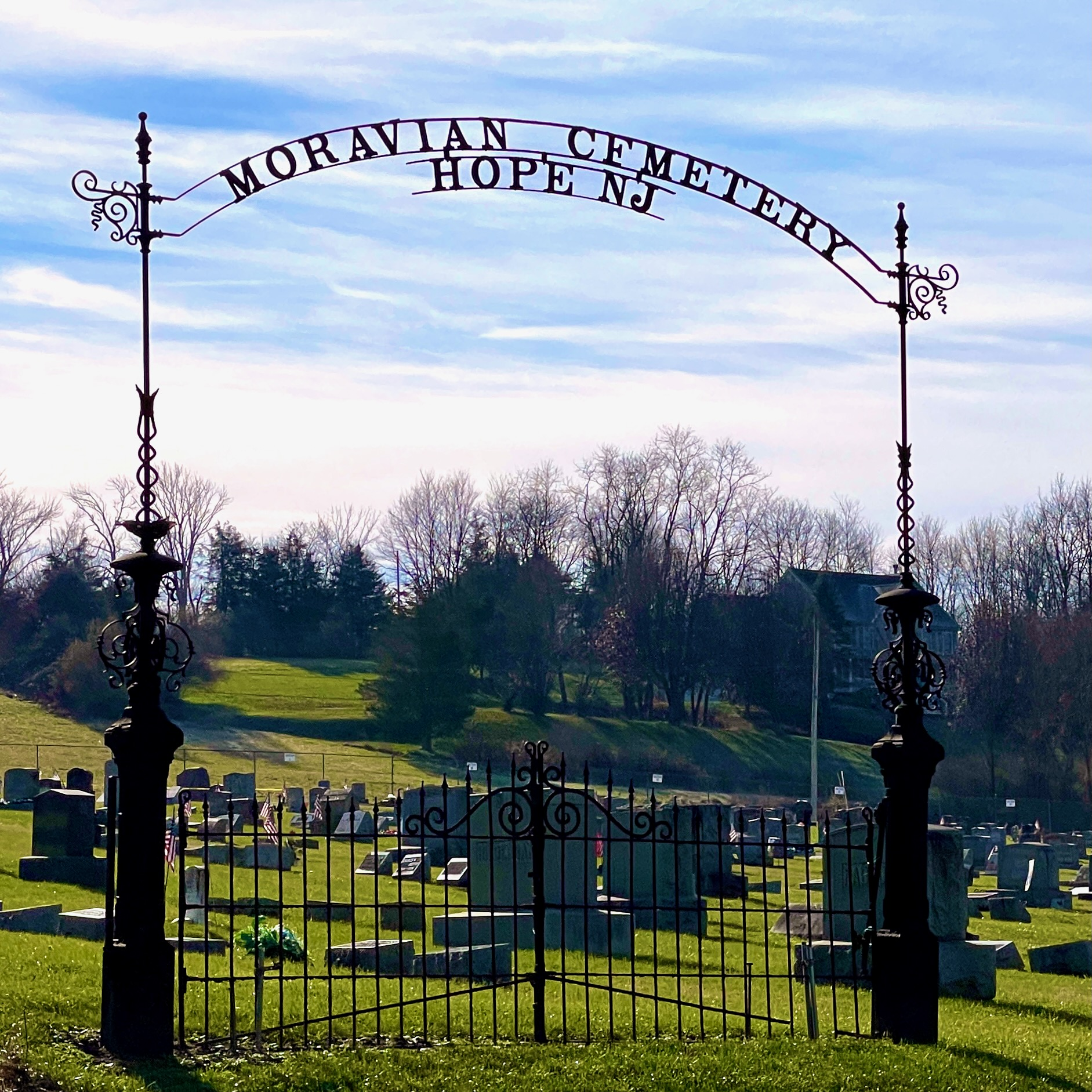
The gate to the Moravian Cemetery in Hope appeared in the horror movie, Friday the 13th.

- Duluth, Minnesota slow-core band Low recorded their 1994 debut LP, I Could Live in Hope in Hope Township, and named the album as a reference to the municipality.
- Hope Township was the filming location for two scenes in the horror movie Friday the 13th, with the Moravian Cemetery (see photo) and Hartung's General Store appearing in the film.

Hope is noted as the inspiration behind the album name "I Could Live in Hope" by the band Low after they stopped there for sandwiches while recording the debut album.

== Points of interest ==
- Land of Make Believe is an amusement park opened in 1954 oriented towards younger children.
