= Riverton–Belvidere Bridge =

Bridge crossing the Delaware River

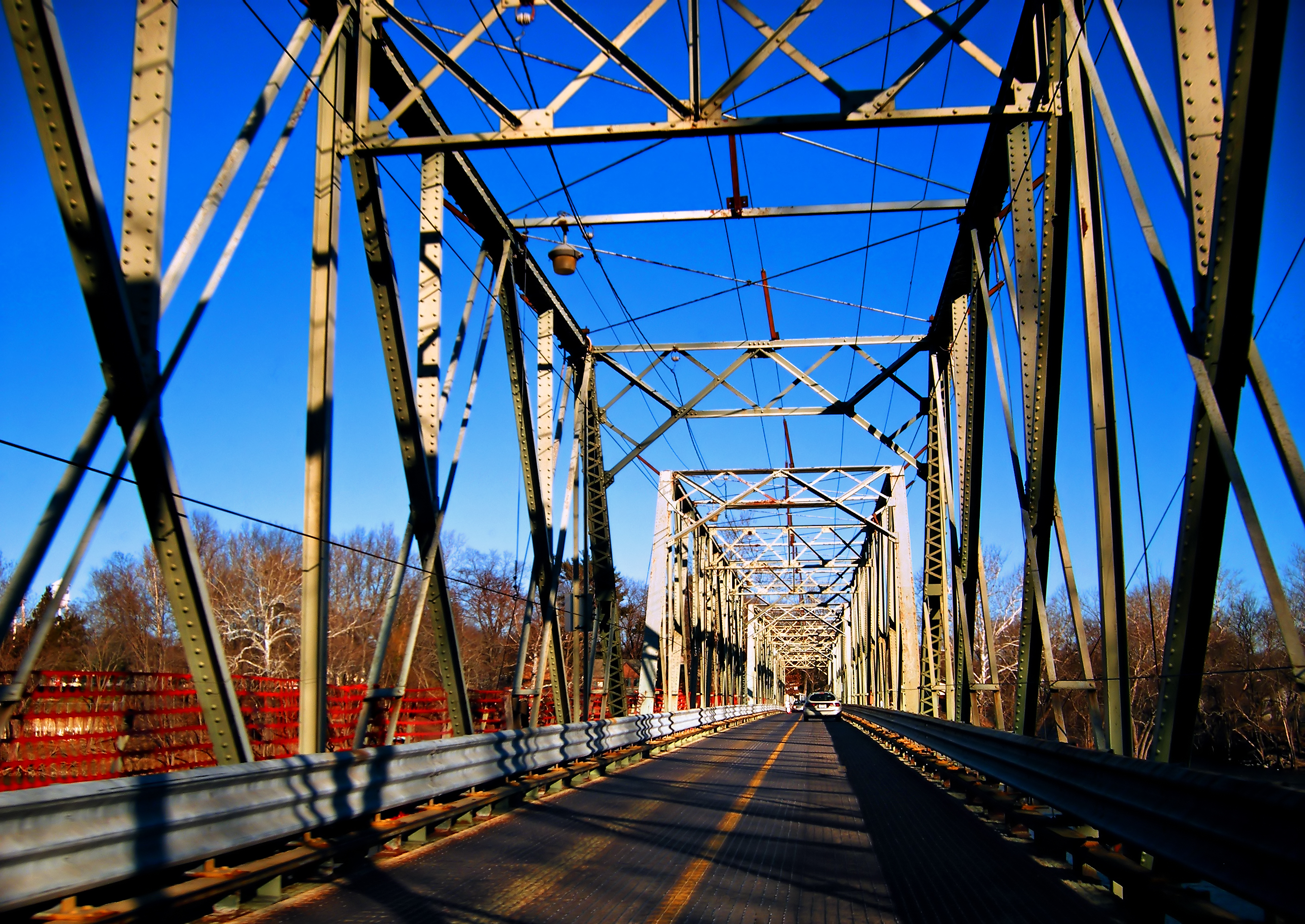
- Riverton-Belvidere Bridge crossing the Delaware River and connecting western New Jersey and eastern Pennsylvania
- Coordinates: 40.8288°N 75.0847°W
- Crosses: Delaware River
- Locale: Belvidere, New Jersey and Riverton, Pennsylvania
- Official name: Riverton–Belvidere Toll Supported Bridge
- Maintained by: Belvidere Delaware Bridge Company (1832-1929); Delaware River Joint Toll Bridge Commission (1929-present)

Characteristics
- Design: Truss bridge
- Total length: 653 feet (199 m)
- Load limit: 8 short tons (7.3 t)

History
- Opened: September 6, 1904

Statistics
- Toll: None

Location
- Interactive map of Riverton–Belvidere Bridge

The Riverton–Belvidere Bridge is a bridge that crosses the Delaware River and connects Belvidere, New Jersey in the east with Riverton, Pennsylvania in the Lehigh Valley region of eastern Pennsylvania in the west.

There is no toll for crossing on either side; tolls were abolished by the Joint Commission for the Elimination of Toll Bridges in 1929. The bridge is 653 feet (199 m) long, and can carry a traffic load of 8 short tons (16,000 lb) from County Route 620 Spur (Water Street) in Belvidere to the former Pennsylvania Route 709 on the Riverton, Pennsylvania side of the river.

The board of freeholders for Warren County, New Jersey supported the replacement of the ferry with a bridge for safety of passengers. In 1832, the state created the Belvidere Delaware Bridge Company, which was paid to build a bridge from Riverton to Belvidere. The bridge was constructed in 1836 by Solon Chapin, a contractor from Easton, Pennsylvania.

The bridge survived two large storms in 1836 and 1841, but sustained major damage both times. In 1903, the floods that destroyed bridges along the Delaware River Valley destroyed the bridge. It was rebuilt the following year, in 1904, with a steel instead of wood foundation. The bridge has since been renovated several times but remains sound and operational.

== History ==
=== The first bridge (1836–1903) ===
Original reports indicate that a ferry, which opened in approximately and was operated by a physician known as "Dr. Belvidere", ran along the alignment of the Riverton–Belvidere Bridge. The ferry crossed one of the most dangerous parts of the Delaware River.

On May 17, 1825, the Board of Chosen Freeholders for the ferry authorized raising the toll rate to cross the river via ferry. By 1832, however, the ferry crossing had become dangerously busy, and required a bridge be constructed in its place. That year, the Belvidere Delaware Bridge Company was established by the states of New Jersey and Pennsylvania. In constructing the bridge, however, the company was only allowed $20,000 in 1832 USD (equal to $645,000 today) to construct it. The bridge company was provided designs for it by Solon Chapin, a contractor from Easton, Pennsylvania. Chapin was also the construction contractor on the nearby Riegelsville Bridge.

Construction on the bridge began in 1834, and the bridge was constructed very quickly as a wooden bridge. When completed in the spring of 1836, it was 654 feet (199 m) long. Within days of its opening, on April 9, 1836, a storm blew through the Lehigh Valley, destroying two of the bridge's three piers and rendered the new bridge unusable. After restarting construction later, the bridge was redone using the same piers. In 1839, it was completed and opened.

In January 1841, another storm, known as the Bridges Freshet of January 1841, inflicted major damage in the Lehigh Valley, destroying most of the region's bridges and causing major damage to the structure from Riverton to Belvidere. This time, however, the Riverton–Belvidere Bridge survived the storm. A local historian said that, because of the constant repair work on the bridge, the bridge company never paid one dividend of money to its stockholders. The company did ultimately paying dividends to its stockholders.

In 1903, a violent storm, dubbed the Pumpkin Flood of 1903, struck both communities and the bridge in between, causing the loss of many lives. On October 17, the bridge's toll collector closed the gate and prohibited passengers from crossing. At 6:40pm that evening, a crash was heard as the bridge collapsed, tumbling into the Delaware River below. Remnants of the bridge were swept downstream, and smashed on the side of the new Northampton Street Bridge that was constructed several years earlier. After the storm cleared, Belvidere restored a ferry service to Riverton.

=== Construction of the current bridge (1904) ===
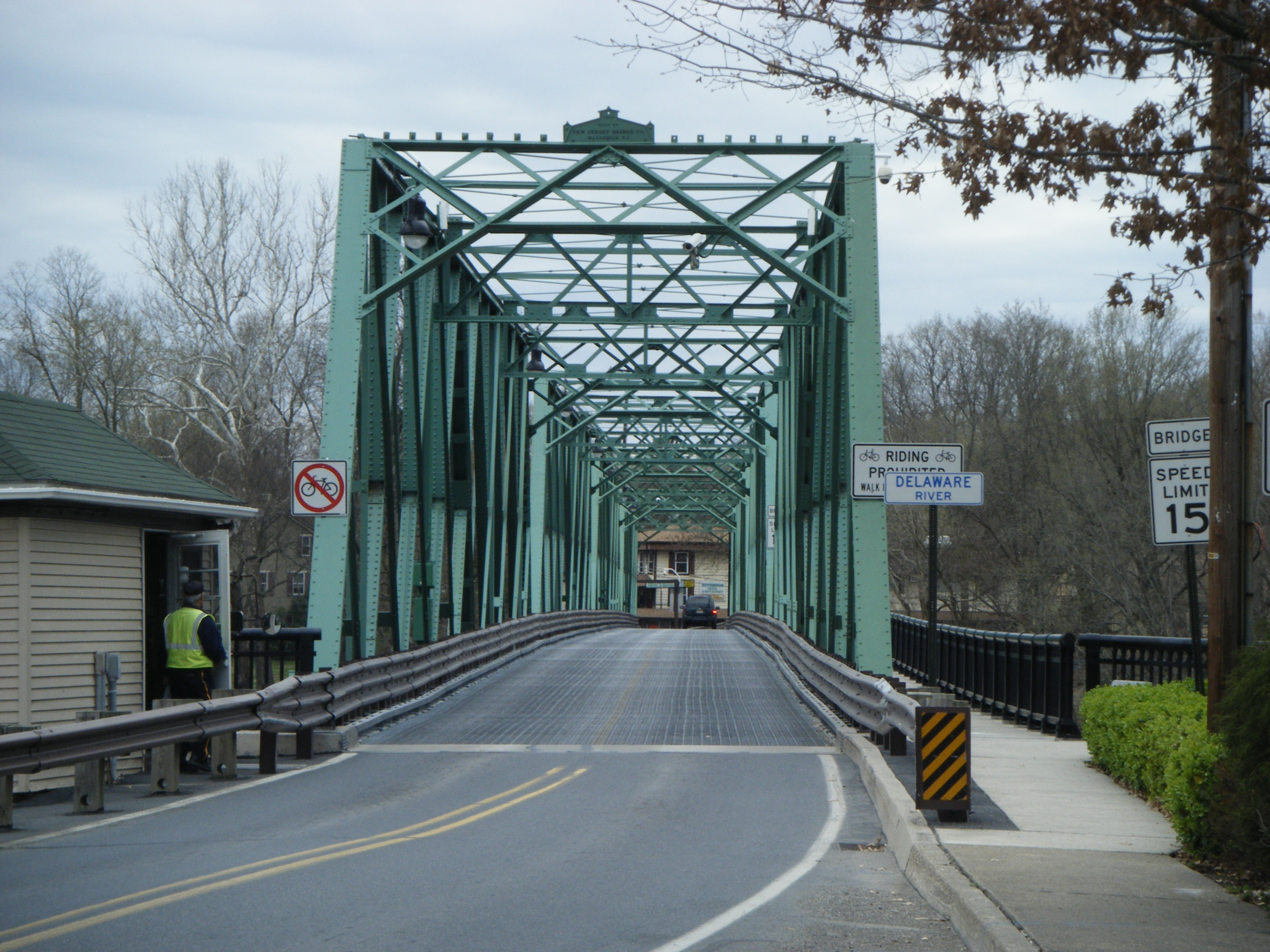
Riverton-Belvidere Bridge looking west from Belvidere, New Jersey

After the 1903 destruction of the original wooden bridge at Belvidere, plans to construct another bridge started immediately. After the storm, the substructure of the crossing had survived the strong storm. The bridge corporation set a completion date, August 17, 1904, which was the day that the Farmer's Picnic was held in Belvidere. The contractor hired to reconstruct the bridge, the New Jersey Bridge Company in Manasquan, New Jersey, believed that the new bridge would need new abutments and piers to be completed by that time, instead of using the old wooden bridge's piers. The three piers from the wooden bridge were used, and would require them to be heightened to be above any high flood waters. On June 3, 1904, the bridge construction began on a barge in the river, with promises to be complete by the set date of August 17. On August 17, the bridge was not complete, but usable, that when the Farmer's Picnic, the predecessor to the Warren County Fair occurred, people were allowed to cross a majority of the bridge. The picnic itself was a success, attracting over 15,000 people, most of who walked the bridge.

Although the bridge was usable, work still had to be completed on the new bridge. The contractor promised the bridge corporation that the bridge would be finished by Labor Day of 1904, or September 5, 1904. The bridge corporation and a local group called The Red Men scheduled festivities and the official turnover of the bridge back to the corporation. On September 5, 1904, the day of the transfer, the chief executive of the contracting company, W.H. Keepers arrived, he found the bridge to be unacceptable. Bolts were missing in places of the bridge and paint was not completed, both of which were in violation of the contract. The festivities for the bridge were canceled, and visitors were disappointed. The Red Men held events, but the turnout was light. A high point of the events that day was done by a man named Murphy Jones, who as a stunt, jumped a 65-foot (20 m) plunge into the Delaware River from the bridge. The festive stunt got Jones a total of $15 (1904 USD, equal to $537.5 today) and the event became an annual one. Work finally came to a conclusion in 1904, and the people were beginning to cross the new structure. However, since the turnover had never occurred, the bridge was free of charge.

=== Current bridge (1904–present) ===
On September 5, 1904, the bridge finally got its transfer to the bridge corporation, and a new toll-taker was hired for the new bridge. After this, life went back to normal in both communities. In October 1928, after the charter and opening of the Delaware River Joint Toll Bridge Commission, the bridge company was asked to sell the bridge to the commission for $60,000 (1928 USD, equal to $1,125,000 today), and on June 14, 1929, the commission abolished tolls along the bridge, making it free to cross at either end. With the bridge now under the control of the toll bridge commission, extensive repairs began on the 25-year-old structure. This construction included new beams for the bridge, new flooring, and an extensive repair to one bridge pier. Although the construction had only taken four months to complete, it still caused havoc in commuting across the structure. In 1940, the Pennsylvania approach to the bridge was designated as Pennsylvania Route 709, a designation that lasted six years and was decommissioned in 1946.

The structure would face its most recent strength test in 1955, after the massive flooding from Hurricane Diane wreaked havoc in the area. The structure received minor damage in the flood, and the traffic was only halted for a day or two afterward. The design in the 1904 plan worked, as the structure was not at flood level.

Starting in October 2006, the Toll Bridge Commission began an $8.8. million rehabilitation of the structure. The rehabilitation helped extend the life of the bridge for years rather than shutting the bridge down constantly for the next 15 years for major repairs. The Commission replaced the flooring, repairing or replacing of certain steel portions of the bridge, blast-cleaning and repainted the structure.

== See also ==
- List of crossings of the Delaware River
