= Warren County Courthouse (New Jersey) =

- U.S. Historic district – Contributing property
- New Jersey Register of Historic Places
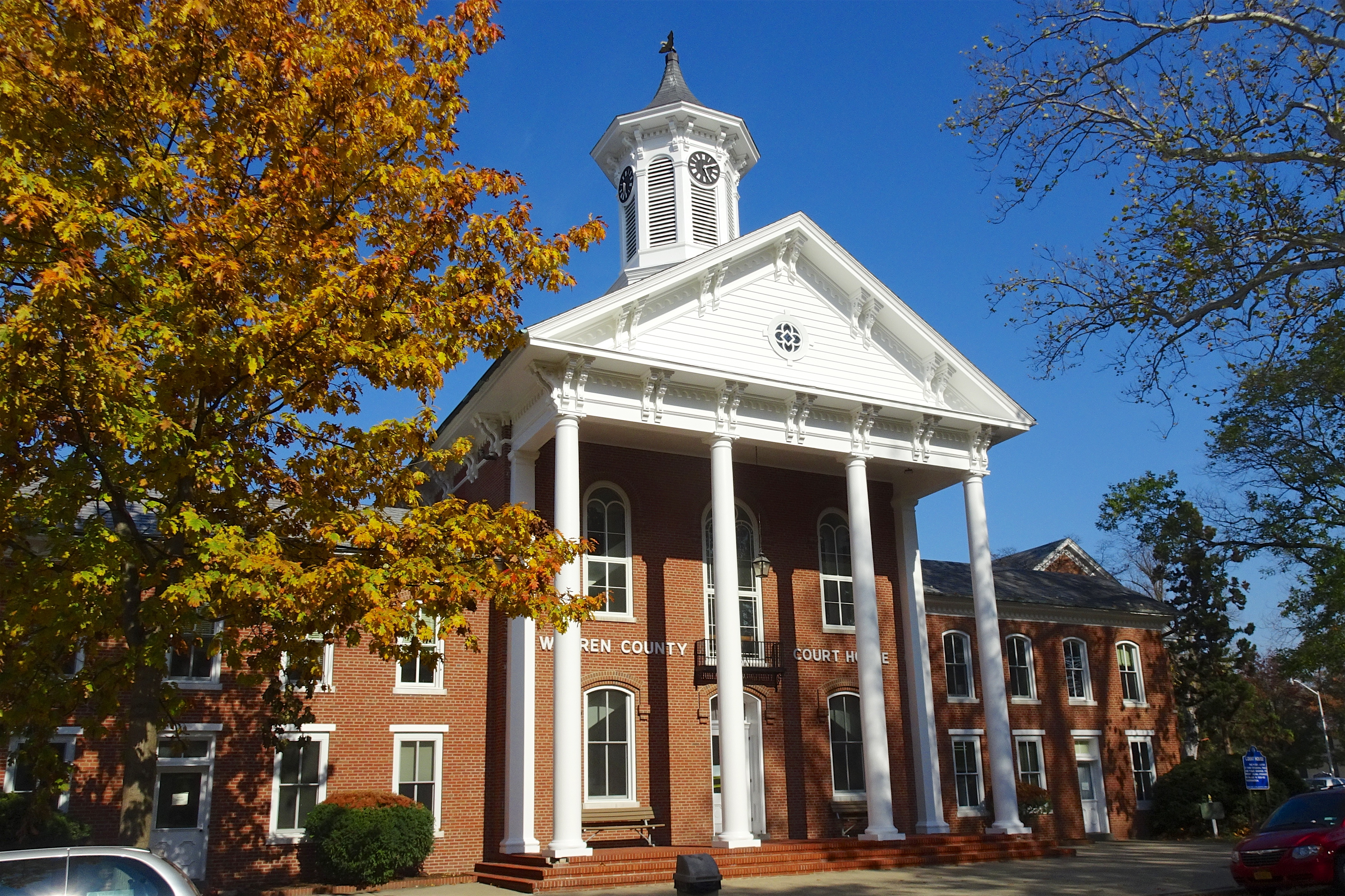
- Warren County Courthouse, 2016

- Location within Warren County, New Jersey Location within New Jersey Location within the United States
- Interactive map showing the location for Warren County Courthouse
- Location: 413 Second Street; Belvidere, New Jersey, U.S.
- Coordinates: 40°49′39″N 75°04′35″W
- Built: 1826
- Part of: Belvidere Historic District (ID80002525)
- NJRHP No.: 2747

Significant dates
- Designated CP: October 3, 1980
- Designated NJRHP: April 27, 1978

The Warren County Courthouse is in Belvidere, the county seat of Warren County, New Jersey. It is part of the 13th vicinage.

It was built 1826 by L. H. Lewis on land donated by Garret Dorset Wall. It was renovated in 1953 and expanded with an addition in 1961.

It is a contributing property to the Belvidere Historic District, added to the National Register of Historic Places on October 3, 1980.

== See also ==
- County courthouses in New Jersey
- Federal courthouses in New Jersey
- Richard J. Hughes Justice Complex
