= Foul Rift =

Rapids in New Jersey, United States

Coordinates: 40.8074°N 75.1°W

Foul Rift is a Class II rapids in the Delaware River from mile 196.3 to 196.7, located about a mile south of Belvidere, New Jersey. The rapids are caused by a 22-foot descent in elevation of the limestone ledge riverbed for approximately 0.5 miles, and are considered to be the most dangerous on the Delaware River. At elevated water levels some of the narrower rapids can become extremely dangerous.
