= Belvidere, New Jersey =

Town in Warren County, New Jersey, US

- Town
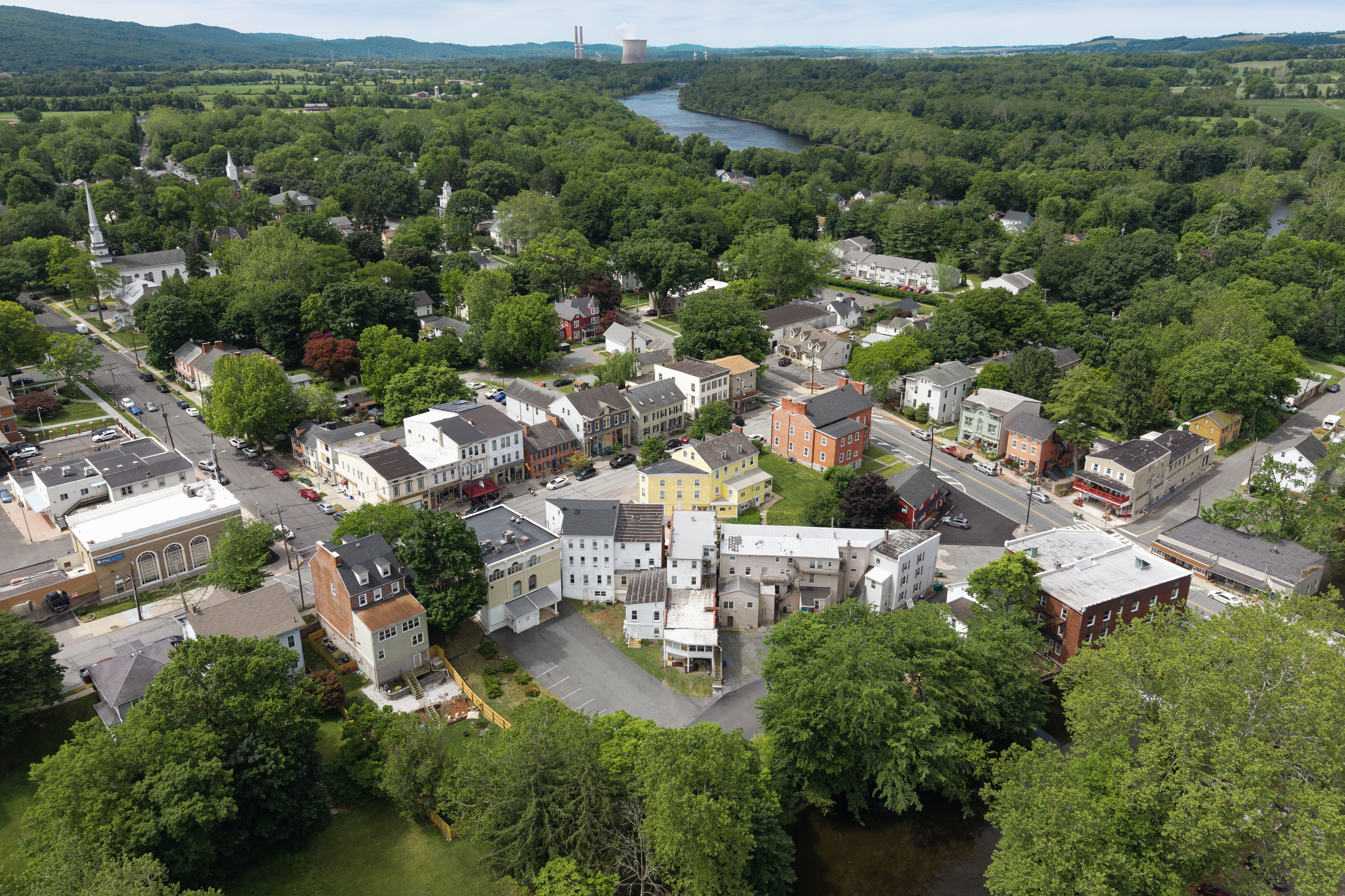
- Belvidere in 2026

- Seal
- Interactive map of Belvidere, New Jersey
- Location in Warren County Location in New Jersey Location in the United States
- Coordinates: 40.829802°N 75.073337°W
- Country: United States
- State: New Jersey
- County: Warren
- Incorporated: April 7, 1845
- Named for: Italian language "beautiful to see"

Government
  - Type: Town
  - Body: Town Council
  - Mayor: Kathleen B. Miers (R, term ends December 31, 2027)
  - Administrator / Municipal clerk: Teresa A. Yeisley

Area
  - Total: 1.48 sq mi (3.84 km^{2})
  - Land: 1.45 sq mi (3.75 km^{2})
  - Water: 0.035 sq mi (0.09 km^{2}) 2.36%
  - Rank: 452nd of 565 in state 22nd of 22 in county
- Elevation: 266 ft (81 m)

Population (2020)
  - Total: 2,520
  - Estimate (2023): 2,536
  - Rank: 467th of 565 in state 16th of 22 in county
  - Density: 1,738.6/sq mi (671.3/km^{2})
  - Rank: 316th of 565 in state 4th of 22 in county
- Time zone: UTC−05:00 (Eastern (EST))
  - Summer (DST): UTC−04:00 (Eastern (EDT))
- ZIP Code: 07823
- Area codes: 908
- FIPS code: 3404104990
- GNIS feature ID: 885156
- Website: www.belviderenj.net

Belvidere is a town in and the county seat of Warren County, in the U.S. state of New Jersey. As of the 2020 United States census, the town's population was 2,520, a decrease of 161 (−6.0%) from the 2010 census count of 2,681, which in turn reflected a decline of 90 (−3.2%) from the 2,771 counted in the 2000 census.

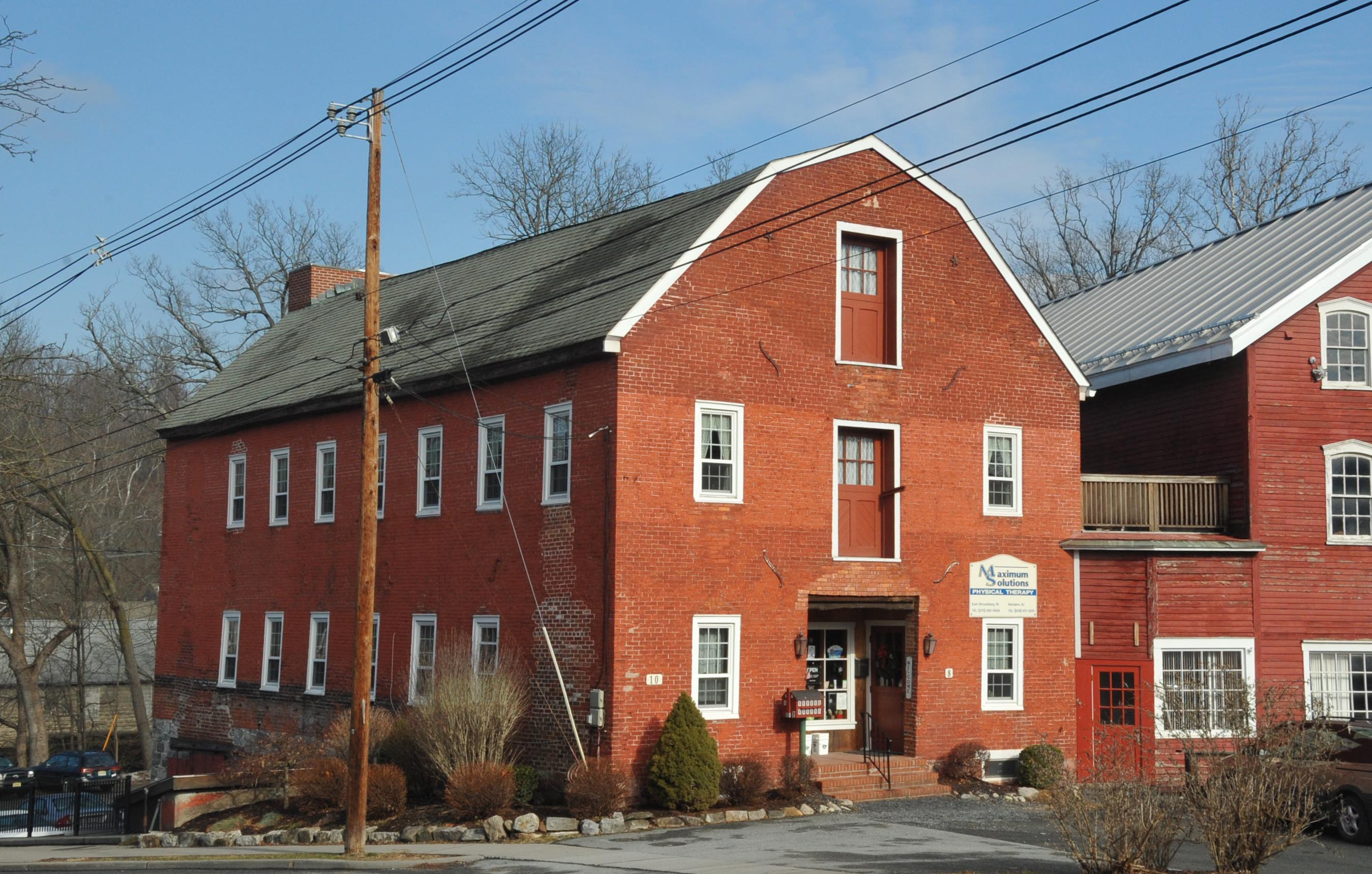
Twin mills in Belvidere Historic District

Belvidere was incorporated as a town by an act of the New Jersey Legislature on April 7, 1845, from portions of Oxford Township, based on the results of a referendum held that day. The town's name is a misspelling of "beautiful to see" in Italian.

== Geography and climate ==
According to the U.S. Census Bureau, the town had a total area of 1.48 square miles (3.84 km^{2}), including 1.45 square miles (3.75 km^{2}) of land and 0.04 square miles (0.09 km^{2}) of water (2.36%). Dildine Island is located in the Delaware River, approximately 4 miles (6.4 km) north of Belvidere.

Belvidere borders White Township in Warren County and Northampton County in Pennsylvania across the Delaware River.

Climate data for Belvidere, New Jersey (1991–2020 normals, extremes 1893–present)
Month	Jan	Feb	Mar	Apr	May	Jun	Jul	Aug	Sep	Oct	Nov	Dec	Year
Record high °F (°C)	69 (21)	77 (25)	87 (31)	96 (36)	100 (38)	103 (39)	106 (41)	103 (39)	104 (40)	94 (34)	81 (27)	73 (23)	106 (41)
Mean maximum °F (°C)	58.2 (14.6)	59.8 (15.4)	68.5 (20.3)	81.2 (27.3)	87.8 (31.0)	91.3 (32.9)	93.9 (34.4)	92.3 (33.5)	88.8 (31.6)	80.2 (26.8)	71.2 (21.8)	60.0 (15.6)	95.2 (35.1)
Mean daily maximum °F (°C)	36.5 (2.5)	39.8 (4.3)	48.1 (8.9)	60.6 (15.9)	70.9 (21.6)	79.3 (26.3)	84.1 (28.9)	82.6 (28.1)	76.3 (24.6)	64.2 (17.9)	52.4 (11.3)	41.4 (5.2)	61.3 (16.3)
Daily mean °F (°C)	27.3 (−2.6)	29.2 (−1.6)	37.0 (2.8)	48.3 (9.1)	58.5 (14.7)	67.4 (19.7)	72.3 (22.4)	71.0 (21.7)	64.1 (17.8)	52.3 (11.3)	41.3 (5.2)	32.5 (0.3)	50.1 (10.1)
Mean daily minimum °F (°C)	18.0 (−7.8)	18.6 (−7.4)	25.9 (−3.4)	36.1 (2.3)	46.0 (7.8)	55.5 (13.1)	60.5 (15.8)	59.4 (15.2)	51.9 (11.1)	40.3 (4.6)	30.2 (−1.0)	23.6 (−4.7)	38.8 (3.8)
Mean minimum °F (°C)	3.4 (−15.9)	5.6 (−14.7)	14.5 (−9.7)	25.3 (−3.7)	33.2 (0.7)	43.9 (6.6)	52.4 (11.3)	50.3 (10.2)	40.1 (4.5)	28.8 (−1.8)	18.3 (−7.6)	11.2 (−11.6)	1.6 (−16.9)
Record low °F (°C)	−20 (−29)	−18 (−28)	−5 (−21)	9 (−13)	27 (−3)	31 (−1)	42 (6)	40 (4)	28 (−2)	18 (−8)	1 (−17)	−14 (−26)	−20 (−29)
Average precipitation inches (mm)	3.22 (82)	2.72 (69)	3.63 (92)	3.95 (100)	4.08 (104)	4.48 (114)	4.81 (122)	4.55 (116)	4.63 (118)	4.75 (121)	3.31 (84)	4.08 (104)	48.21 (1,225)
Average snowfall inches (cm)	9.9 (25)	5.2 (13)	3.5 (8.9)	0.3 (0.76)	0.0 (0.0)	0.0 (0.0)	0.0 (0.0)	0.0 (0.0)	0.0 (0.0)	0.0 (0.0)	0.4 (1.0)	4.0 (10)	23.3 (59)
Average precipitation days (≥ 0.01 in)	10.6	8.8	10.7	11.1	13.7	12.0	11.3	11.1	9.0	10.4	9.8	12.0	130.5
Average snowy days (≥ 0.1 in)	3.8	2.6	1.6	0.1	0.0	0.0	0.0	0.0	0.0	0.0	0.2	2.1	10.4
Source: NOAA

== Demographics ==
Historical population
Census	Pop.	Note	%±
1850	1,001		—
1860	1,530		52.8%
1870	1,882		23.0%
1880	1,773		−5.8%
1890	1,768		−0.3%
1900	1,784		0.9%
1910	1,764		−1.1%
1920	1,793		1.6%
1930	2,073		15.6%
1940	2,060		−0.6%
1950	2,406		16.8%
1960	2,636		9.6%
1970	2,722		3.3%
1980	2,475		−9.1%
1990	2,669		7.8%
2000	2,771		3.8%
2010	2,681		−3.2%
2020	2,520		−6.0%
2023 (est.)	2,536	▲	0.6%
Population sources: 1850–1920 1850–1870; 1850 1870 1880–1890; 1890–1910 1910–1930; 1940–2000; 2010 2020

=== 2020 census ===
As of the 2020 census, Belvidere had a population of 2,520. The median age was 41.7 years. 21.3% of residents were under the age of 18 and 15.8% of residents were 65 years of age or older. For every 100 females there were 94.7 males, and for every 100 females age 18 and over there were 93.3 males age 18 and over.

0.0% of residents lived in urban areas, while 100.0% lived in rural areas.

There were 1,031 households in Belvidere, of which 28.5% had children under the age of 18 living in them. Of all households, 45.2% were married-couple households, 19.6% were households with a male householder and no spouse or partner present, and 28.8% were households with a female householder and no spouse or partner present. About 31.0% of all households were made up of individuals and 13.4% had someone living alone who was 65 years of age or older.

There were 1,143 housing units, of which 9.8% were vacant. The homeowner vacancy rate was 3.2% and the rental vacancy rate was 9.5%.

Racial composition as of the 2020 census
Race	Number	Percent
White	2,220	88.1%
Black or African American	30	1.2%
American Indian and Alaska Native	7	0.3%
Asian	25	1.0%
Native Hawaiian and Other Pacific Islander	0	0.0%
Some other race	56	2.2%
Two or more races	182	7.2%
Hispanic or Latino (of any race)	198	7.9%

=== 2010 census ===
The 2010 United States census counted 2,681 people, 1,054 households, and 682 families in the town. The population density was 1,847.0 inhabitants per square mile (713.1/km^{2}). There were 1,140 housing units at an average density of 785.4 per square mile (303.2/km^{2}). The racial makeup was 96.01% (2,574) White, 1.57% (42) Black or African American, 0.11% (3) Native American, 0.78% (21) Asian, 0.00% (0) Pacific Islander, 0.22% (6) from other races, and 1.31% (35) from two or more races. Hispanic or Latino of any race were 3.62% (97) of the population.

Of the 1,054 households, 30.8% had children under the age of 18; 48.8% were married couples living together; 12.3% had a female householder with no husband present and 35.3% were non-families. Of all households, 28.7% were made up of individuals and 10.6% had someone living alone who was 65 years of age or older. The average household size was 2.52 and the average family size was 3.17.

25.3% of the population were under the age of 18, 8.2% from 18 to 24, 23.4% from 25 to 44, 30.6% from 45 to 64, and 12.4% who were 65 years of age or older. The median age was 41.0 years. For every 100 females, the population had 93.0 males. For every 100 females ages 18 and older there were 88.5 males.

The Census Bureau's 2006–2010 American Community Survey showed that (in 2010 inflation-adjusted dollars) median household income was $60,707 (with a margin of error of +/− $10,476) and the median family income was $74,028 (+/− $13,366). Males had a median income of $53,796 (+/− $11,432) versus $32,000 (+/− $7,359) for females. The per capita income for the town was $28,220 (+/− $2,359). About 0.8% of families and 2.3% of the population were below the poverty line, including none of those under age 18 and 2.9% of those age 65 or over.

=== 2000 census ===
As of the 2000 U.S. census, there were 2,771 people, 1,088 households, and 716 families residing in the town. The population density was 2,091.7 inhabitants per square mile (807.6/km^{2}). There were 1,165 housing units at an average density of 879.4 per square mile (339.5/km^{2}). The racial makeup of the town was 98.02% White, 0.51% African American, 0.04% Native American, 0.51% Asian, 0.25% from other races, and 0.69% from two or more races. Hispanic or Latino of any race were 2.31% of the population.

There were 1,088 households, out of which 36.4% had children under the age of 18 living with them, 52.0% were married couples living together, 9.7% had a female householder with no husband present, and 34.1% were non-families. 28.5% of all households were made up of individuals, and 11.1% had someone living alone who was 65 years of age or older. The average household size was 2.54 and the average family size was 3.17.

In the town, the population was spread out, with 28.1% under the age of 18, 6.1% from 18 to 24, 32.2% from 25 to 44, 20.7% from 45 to 64, and 12.8% who were 65 years of age or older. The median age was 36 years. For every 100 females, there were 92.0 males. For every 100 females age 18 and over, there were 88.5 males.

The median income for a household in the town was $52,792, and the median income for a family was $62,212. Males had a median income of $41,800 versus $31,444 for females. The per capita income for the town was $23,231. About 1.3% of families and 3.4% of the population were below the poverty line, including 0.4% of those under age 18 and 10.4% of those age 65 or over.

== Economy ==
A large site of DSM-Firmenich Nutritional Products that includes 250,000 square feet (23,000 m^{2}) of facilities in the town, manufacturing products including arachidonic acid and beta-carotene by fermentation processes, is located on the town's border with White Township.

== Holidays ==
Belvidere, once every year, on the first Saturday after Labor Day, celebrates their founding and legacy with the "Victorian Days" event, where people dress in a similar style to the 1800s. The location, Garret Wall, usually contains fun facts about Belvidere, prize games, timed events, horse rides, etc. It is a day where the county seat of Belvidere unites together as one.

== Government ==
=== Local government ===
Belvidere is governed under the town form of municipal government. The town is one of nine municipalities (of the 564) statewide that use this traditional form of government. The governing body is comprised of the mayor and the six-member Town Council, with all positions elected at-large on a partisan basis as part of the November general election. A mayor is elected directly by the voters to a four-year term of office. The town council consists of six members elected to serve three-year terms on a staggered basis, with two seats coming up for election each year in a three-year cycle.

As of 2026, the Mayor of Belvidere is Republican Kathleen B. Miers, whose term of office ends December 31, 2027. Members of the Town Council are Council President Joseph Roth (R, 2027), Christopher Allen (R, 2026), John Johnson III (D, 2028), Peter Koop (R, 2027), Tammy Koop (R, 2026) and Donald Mitchell (R, 2028).

=== Federal, state, and county representation ===
Belvidere is located in the 7th Congressional District and is part of New Jersey's 23rd state legislative district.

For the 119th United States Congress, New Jersey's 7th congressional district is represented by Thomas Kean Jr. (R, Westfield). New Jersey is represented in the United States Senate by Democrats Cory Booker (Newark, term ends 2027) and Andy Kim (Moorestown, term ends 2031).

For the 2026–2027 session, the 23rd legislative district of the New Jersey Legislature is represented in the State Senate by Doug Steinhardt (R, Lopatcong Township) and in the General Assembly by John DiMaio (R, Hackettstown) and Erik Peterson (R, Franklin Township).

Warren County is governed by a three-member Board of County Commissioners, who are chosen at-large on a staggered basis in partisan elections with one seat coming up for election each year as part of the November general election. At an annual reorganization meeting held in the beginning of January, the board selects one of its members to serve as Commissioner Director and other as Deputy Director. As of 2025, Warren County's Commissioners are:

Deputy Director Jason J. Sarnoski (R, Lopatcong Township; 2025), Lori Ciesla (R, Lopatcong Township; 2026), and Director James R. Kern III (R, Pohatcong Township; 2027).

Constitutional officers of Warren County are: Clerk Holly Mackey (R, Alpha; 2027), Sheriff James McDonald Sr. (R, Phillipsburg; 2025) and Surrogate Michael J. Doherty (R, Washington; 2025).

=== Politics ===
As of March 2011, there were a total of 1,687 registered voters in Belvidere, of which 380 (22.5% vs. 21.5% countywide) were registered as Democrats, 611 (36.2% vs. 35.3%) were registered as Republicans and 694 (41.1% vs. 43.1%) were registered as Unaffiliated. There were 2 voters registered as either Libertarians or Greens. Among the town's 2010 Census population, 62.9% (vs. 62.3% in Warren County) were registered to vote, including 84.3% of those ages 18 and over (vs. 81.5% countywide).

Gubernatorial election results for Belvidere
Year	Republican		Democratic		Third party(ies)	
Year	No.	%	No.	%	No.	%
2025	641	56.23%	483	42.37%	16	1.40%
2021	575	65.42%	292	33.22%	12	1.37%
2017	426	57.18%	281	37.72%	38	5.10%
2013	494	68.33%	195	26.97%	34	4.70%
2009	480	57.49%	221	26.47%	134	16.05%
2005	430	53.02%	338	41.68%	43	5.30%

In the 2012 presidential election, Republican Mitt Romney received 656 votes (53.8% vs. 56.0% countywide), ahead of Democrat Barack Obama with 521 votes (42.7% vs. 40.8%) and other candidates with 24 votes (2.0% vs. 1.7%), among the 1,220 ballots cast by the town's 1,724 registered voters, for a turnout of 70.8% (vs. 66.7% in Warren County). In the 2008 presidential election, Republican John McCain received 693 votes (55.0% vs. 55.2% countywide), ahead of Democrat Barack Obama with 514 votes (40.8% vs. 41.4%) and other candidates with 27 votes (2.1% vs. 1.6%), among the 1,260 ballots cast by the town's 1,684 registered voters, for a turnout of 74.8% (vs. 73.4% in Warren County). In the 2004 presidential election, Republican George W. Bush received 779 votes (61.9% vs. 61.0% countywide), ahead of Democrat John Kerry with 452 votes (35.9% vs. 37.2%) and other candidates with 21 votes (1.7% vs. 1.3%), among the 1,259 ballots cast by the town's 1,640 registered voters, for a turnout of 76.8% (vs. 76.3% in the whole county).

United States presidential election results for Belvidere
Year	Republican		Democratic		Third party(ies)	
Year	No.	%	No.	%	No.	%
2024	887	61.21%	529	36.51%	33	2.28%
2020	886	59.74%	559	37.69%	38	2.56%
2016	772	61.12%	429	33.97%	62	4.91%
2012	656	54.62%	521	43.38%	24	2.00%
2008	693	56.16%	514	41.65%	27	2.19%
2004	779	62.22%	452	36.10%	21	1.68%

In the 2013 gubernatorial election, Republican Chris Christie received 68.3% of the vote (494 cast), ahead of Democrat Barbara Buono with 27.0% (195 votes), and other candidates with 4.7% (34 votes), among the 740 ballots cast by the town's 1,758 registered voters (17 ballots were spoiled), for a turnout of 42.1%. In the 2009 gubernatorial election, Republican Chris Christie received 480 votes (56.7% vs. 61.3% countywide), ahead of Democrat Jon Corzine with 221 votes (26.1% vs. 25.7%), Independent Chris Daggett with 116 votes (13.7% vs. 9.8%) and other candidates with 18 votes (2.1% vs. 1.5%), among the 847 ballots cast by the town's 1,642 registered voters, yielding a 51.6% turnout (vs. 49.6% in the county).

United States Senate election results for Belvidere1
Year	Republican		Democratic		Third party(ies)	
Year	No.	%	No.	%	No.	%
2024	843	59.66%	527	37.30%	43	3.04%
2018	594	59.88%	340	34.27%	58	5.85%
2012	598	52.23%	512	44.72%	35	3.06%
2006	445	55.42%	316	39.35%	42	5.23%

United States Senate election results for Belvidere2
Year	Republican		Democratic		Third party(ies)	
Year	No.	%	No.	%	No.	%
2020	827	57.31%	559	38.74%	57	3.95%
2014	385	54.84%	284	40.46%	33	4.70%
2013	281	63.43%	158	35.67%	4	0.90%
2008	677	57.13%	467	39.41%	41	3.46%

== Education ==
The Belvidere School District serves students in pre-kindergarten through twelfth grade. As of the 2023–24 school year, the district, comprised of two schools, had an enrollment of 580 students and 55.4 classroom teachers (on an FTE basis), for a student–teacher ratio of 10.5:1. Schools in the district (with 2023–24 enrollment data from the National Center for Education Statistics) are Belvidere Elementary School with 259 students in grades PreK–8 and Belvidere High School with 318 students in grades 9–12. Students from Harmony Township, Hope Township and White Township attend the district's high school as part of sending/receiving relationships with the respective districts.

Students from the town and from all of Warren County are eligible to attend Ridge and Valley Charter School in Blairstown (for grades K–8) or Warren County Technical School in Washington borough (for 9–12), with special education services provided by local districts supplemented throughout the county by the Warren County Special Services School District in Oxford Township (for Pre-K–12).

In 2018, Belvidere was rated one of the Top 5 Schools in each county with the highest rate of drug/violence/bullying incidents, based on the number of incidents per every 100 enrolled students.

== Transportation ==
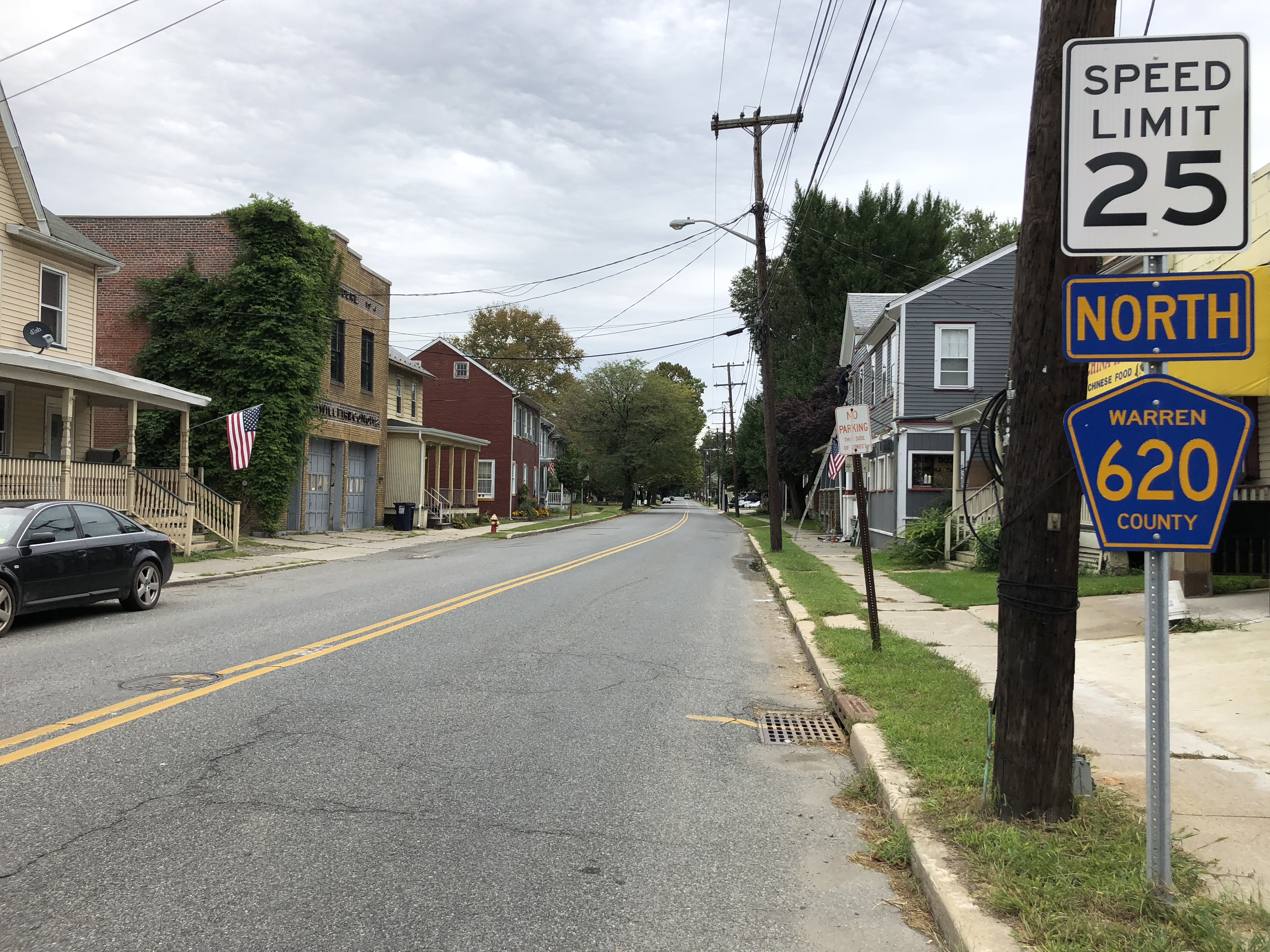
County Route 620 in Belvidere

As of May 2010, the town had a total of 16.39 miles (26.38 km) of roadways, of which 14.38 miles (23.14 km) were maintained by the municipality and 2.01 miles (3.23 km) by Warren County.

The most prominent highway is County Route 620.

The Riverton–Belvidere Bridge crosses the Delaware River, connecting Belvidere with Riverton, Pennsylvania, operated by the Delaware River Joint Toll Bridge Commission. There is no toll for crossing on either side, after tolls were abolished by the Joint Commission for the Elimination of Toll Bridges in 1929. The bridge is 653 feet (199 m) long, connecting County Route 620 Spur (Water Street) in Belvidere to former Pennsylvania Route 709 on the Riverton side.

== Notable people ==
People who were born in, residents of, or otherwise closely associated with Belvidere include:

- Donald J. Albanese (born 1937), politician who served in the New Jersey General Assembly from 1976 to 1982
- C. Ledyard Blair (1867–1949), investment banker and yachtsman
- DeWitt Clinton Blair (1833–1915), philanthropist and industrialist
- Charles W. Buttz (1837–1913), member of the United States House of Representatives from South Carolina
- Dan Gray (born 1956), former NFL defensive tackle who played for the Detroit Lions in 1978
- Henry S. Harris (1850–1902), former U.S. Member of Congress
- Don Hume (born 1938), former NASCAR driver who competed in 15 Winston Cup events
- Joseph Johnson (1785–1877), former member of Congress and Governor of Virginia
- John Patterson Bryan Maxwell (1804–1845), politician who represented New Jersey in the United States House of Representatives from 1837 to 1839 and again from 1841 to 1843
- William McMurtrie (1851–1913), chemist who served as president of the American Chemical Society
- Don Reitz (1929–2014), ceramic artist, recognized for inspiring a reemergence of salt glaze pottery in the United States
- Ernest Schelling (1876–1939), pianist, composer, conductor and music director who was the conductor of the Baltimore Symphony Orchestra from 1935 to 1937
- Melville Amasa Scovell (1855–1912), chemist
- George W. Scranton (1811–1861), former member of Congress and founder of the city of Scranton
- Chris Wylde (born 1976), actor and comedian

== Places of interest ==
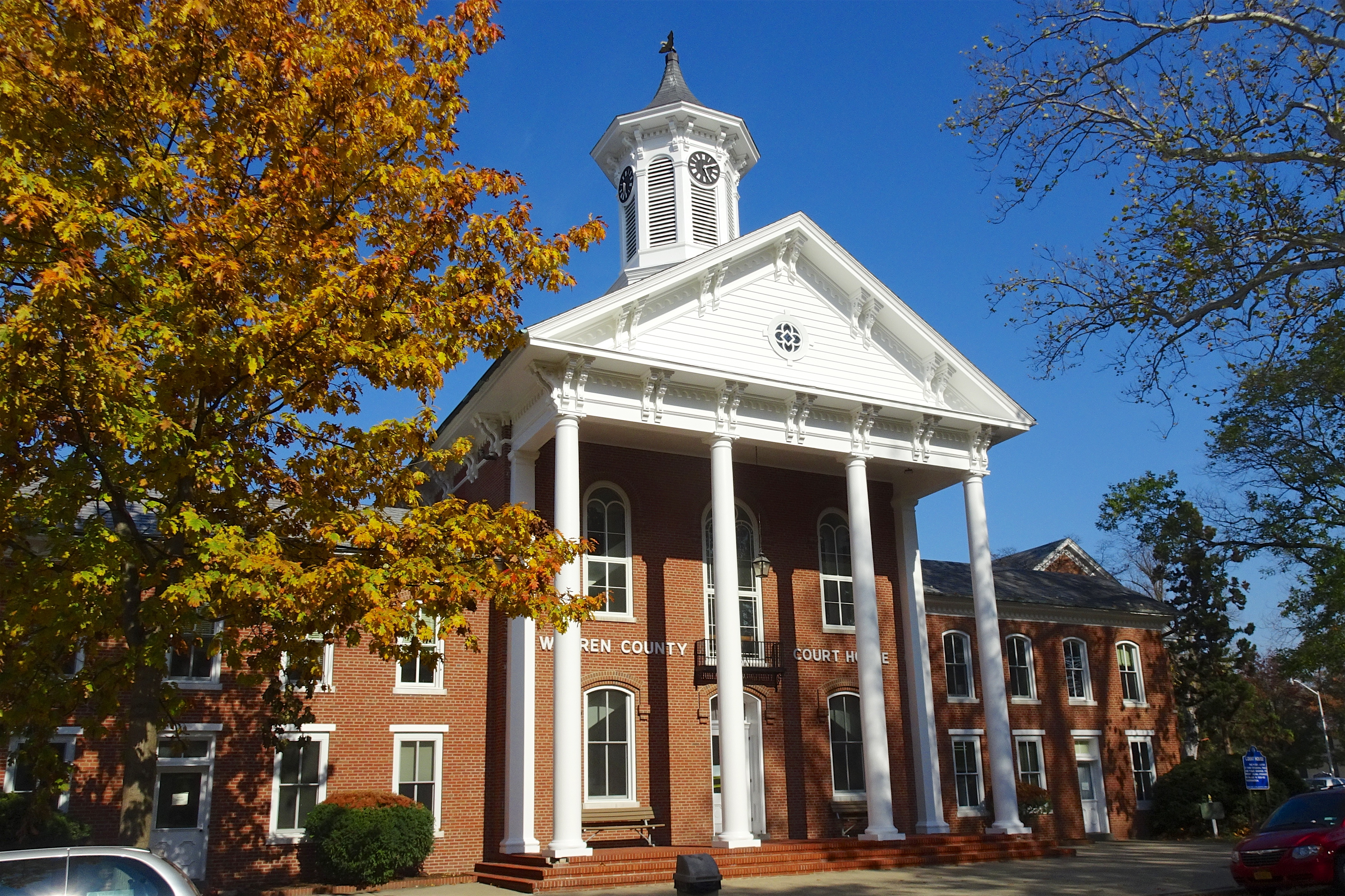
Warren County Courthouse

- Belvidere Cemetery – Dating back to 1834, the cemetery is the burial site of several historical figures, many associated with the Civil War, and has been included in tours conducted as part of the town's annual Victorian Days celebration.
- Foul Rift is a Class II rapids on the Delaware River located south of Belvidere, in which a drop of 22 feet (6.7 m) in elevation in a span of 0.5 miles (0.80 km) creates one of the river's most dangerous stretches.
- Four Sisters Winery – Established in 1984, the winery was named for the four daughters of the founders.
- Robert Morris House – Built by Robert Morris, a signer of the Declaration of Independence, the house is one of the town's oldest homes.
- Warren County Courthouse – Future New Jersey governor-elect Garret D. Wall (who declined to serve as governor after being elected in 1829) donated the land in 1825 and the courthouse was completed in 1826 at a cost of $10,000. In 1892, the courthouse was the site of the county's most recent public hanging.
- Warren County Museum – Now the home of the Warren County Historical and Genealogical Society, the museum is located on Garret D. Wall county square in a townhome constructed c. 1848 and purchased in 1980, which houses many items related to the history of Warren County.
