= Belvidere Historic District (Belvidere, New Jersey) =

Historic district in New Jersey, United States

- U.S. National Register of Historic Places
- U.S. Historic district
- New Jersey Register of Historic Places
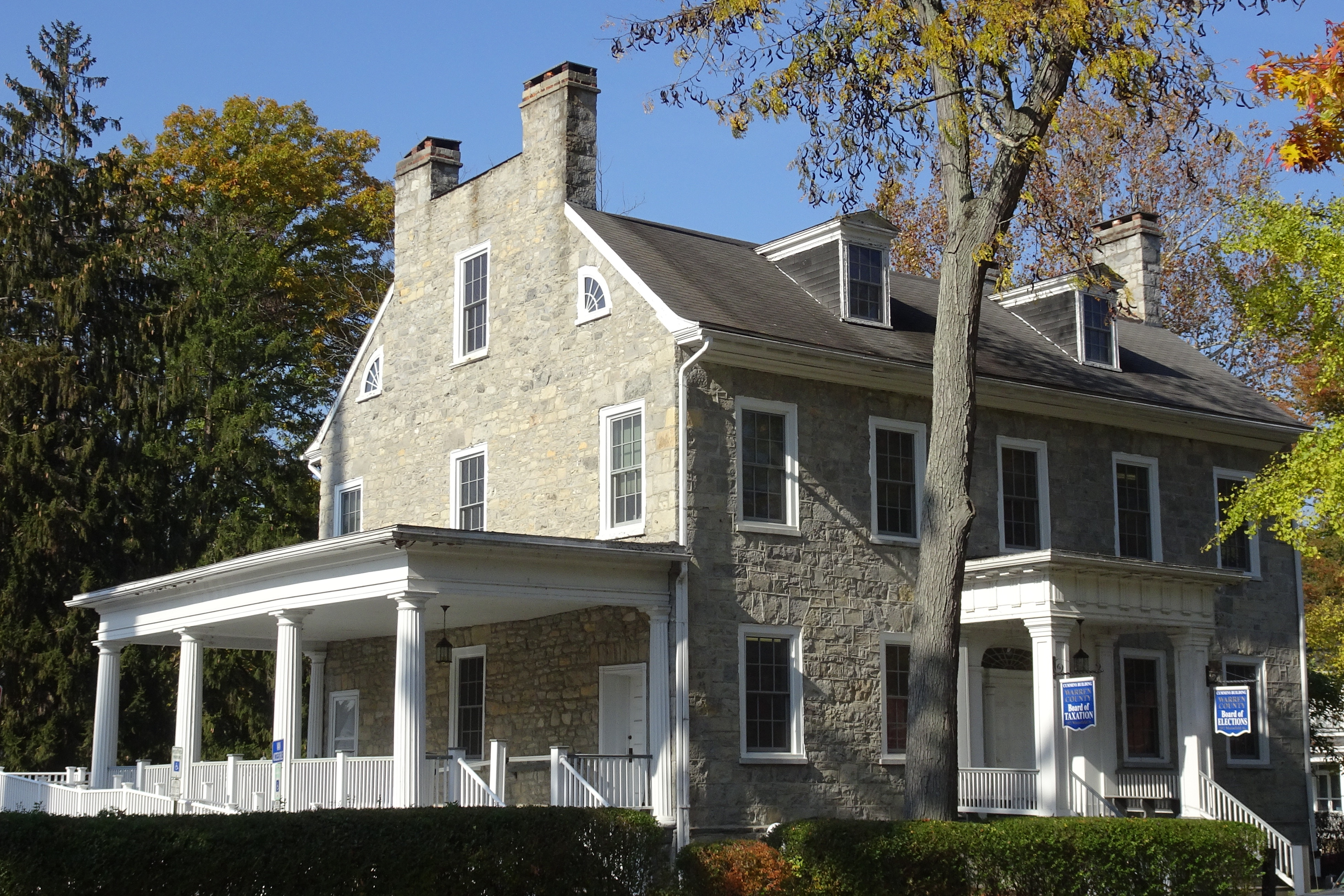
- Maxwell–Robeson–Cummins House

- Location within Warren County, New Jersey Location within New Jersey Location within the United States
- Location: Belvidere, New Jersey
- Coordinates: 40°49′45″N 75°04′37″W
- Area: 132 acres (53 ha)
- Architectural style: Greek Revival, Late Victorian, Federal
- NRHP reference No.: 80002525
- NJRHP No.: 2747

Significant dates
- Added to NRHP: October 3, 1980
- Designated NJRHP: April 27, 1978

The Belvidere Historic District is a 132-acre (53 ha) historic district encompassing the town of Belvidere, the county seat of Warren County, New Jersey, United States. It was added to the National Register of Historic Places on October 3, 1980 for its significance in architecture, commerce, community planning, industry, politics and government during the 19th century. The district is bounded by Market and Race streets; Greenwich and Mansfield avenues; and the Pequest River. It contains 228 contributing buildings, including the Warren County Courthouse.

== History and description ==
Belvidere was selected as the county seat of the newly formed Warren County in 1825 and was incorporated as a town in 1845. The two and one-half story brick Warren County Courthouse was built in 1825, remodeled around 1870, and extended in 1960. The Maxwell–Robeson–Cummins House was built in 1834 by politician John P. B. Maxwell. The two and one-half story stone building features Federal architecture. Dr. George Cummins, local historian, lived here around 1900. The United Presbyterian Church was built in 1859. The Twin Mills are the two and one-half story brick Cotton Mill and the two and one-half story frame McMurtrie's Mill.

== Gallery of contributing properties ==
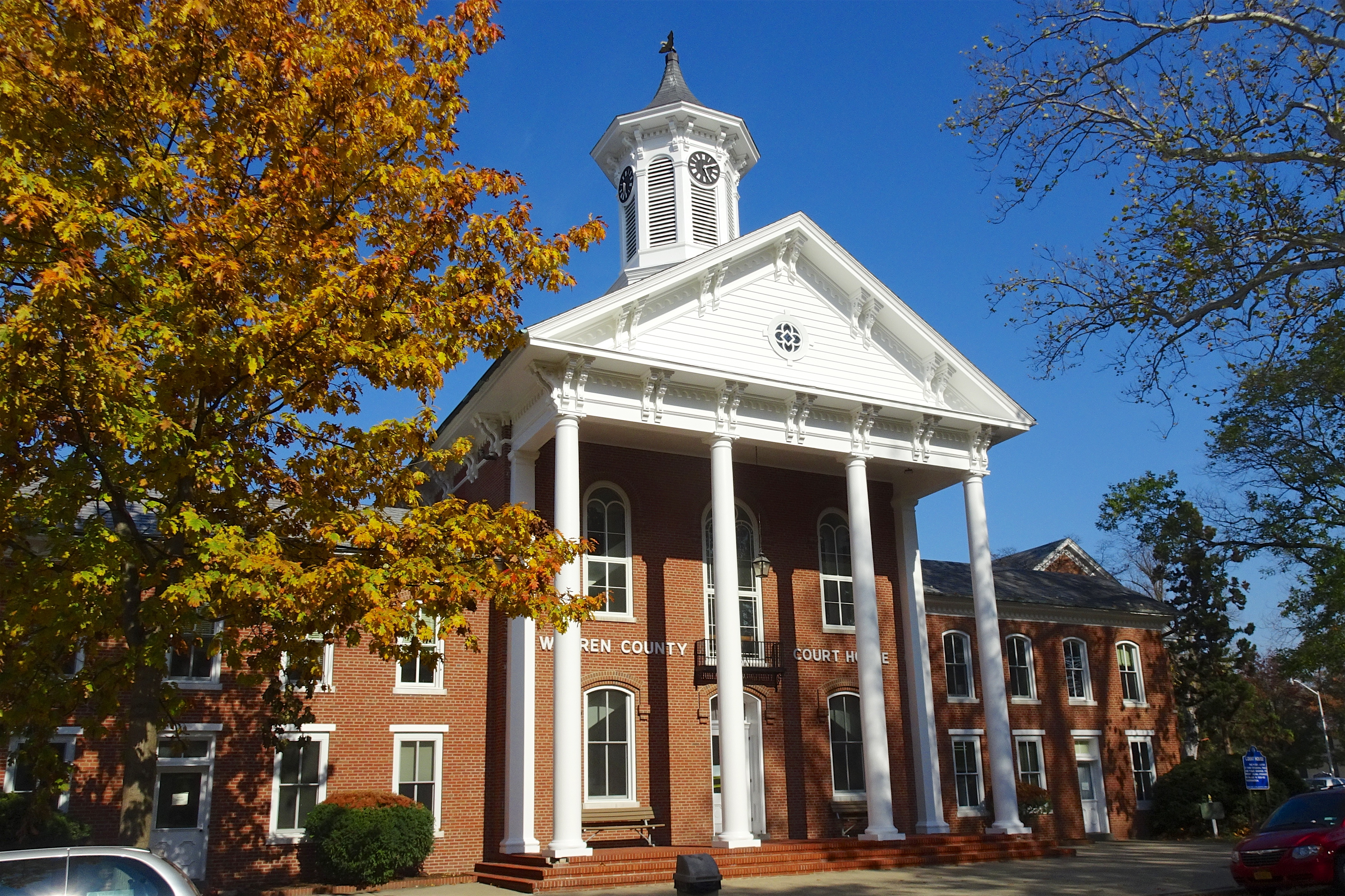
Warren County Courthouse

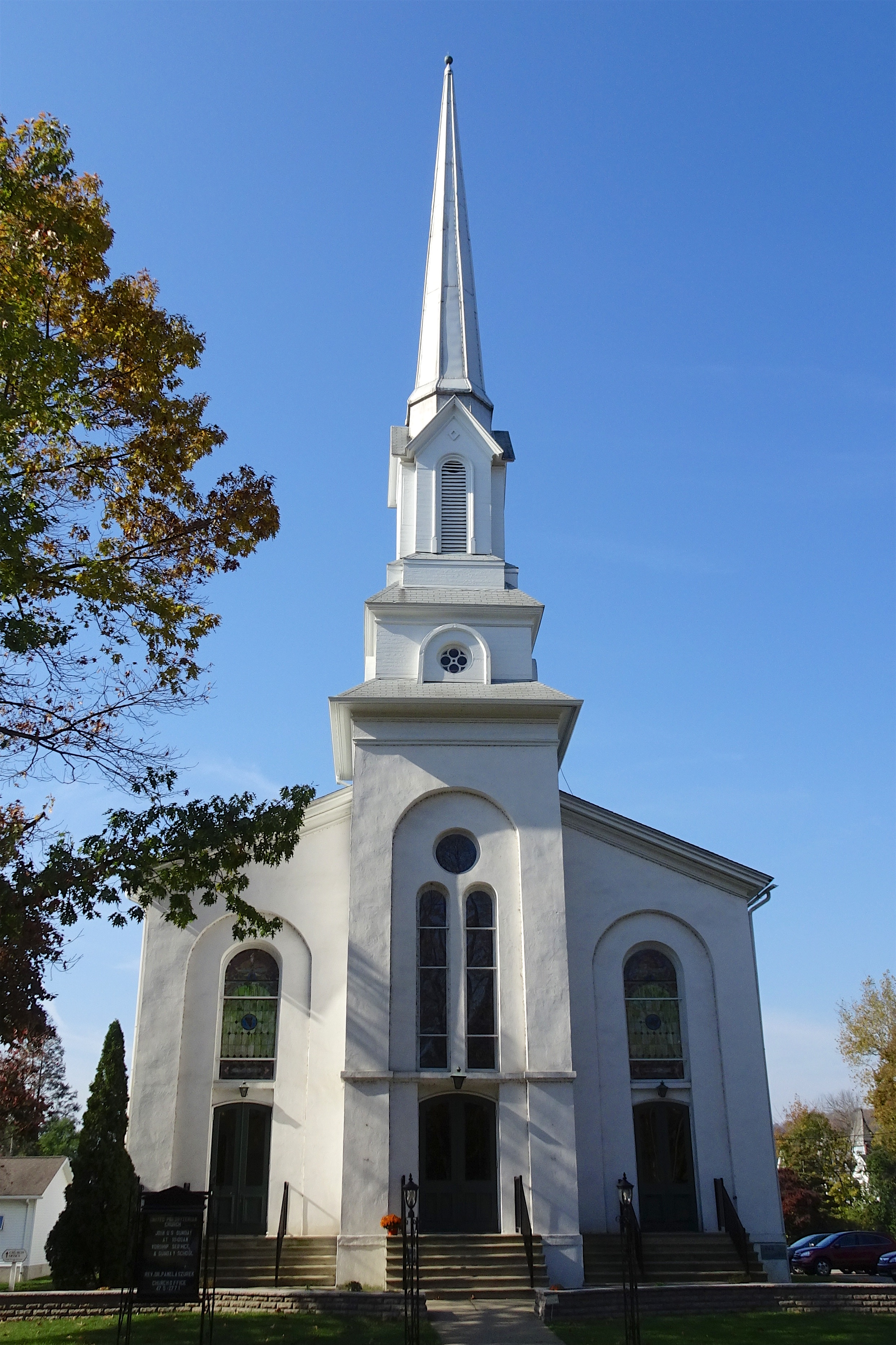
United Presbyterian Church

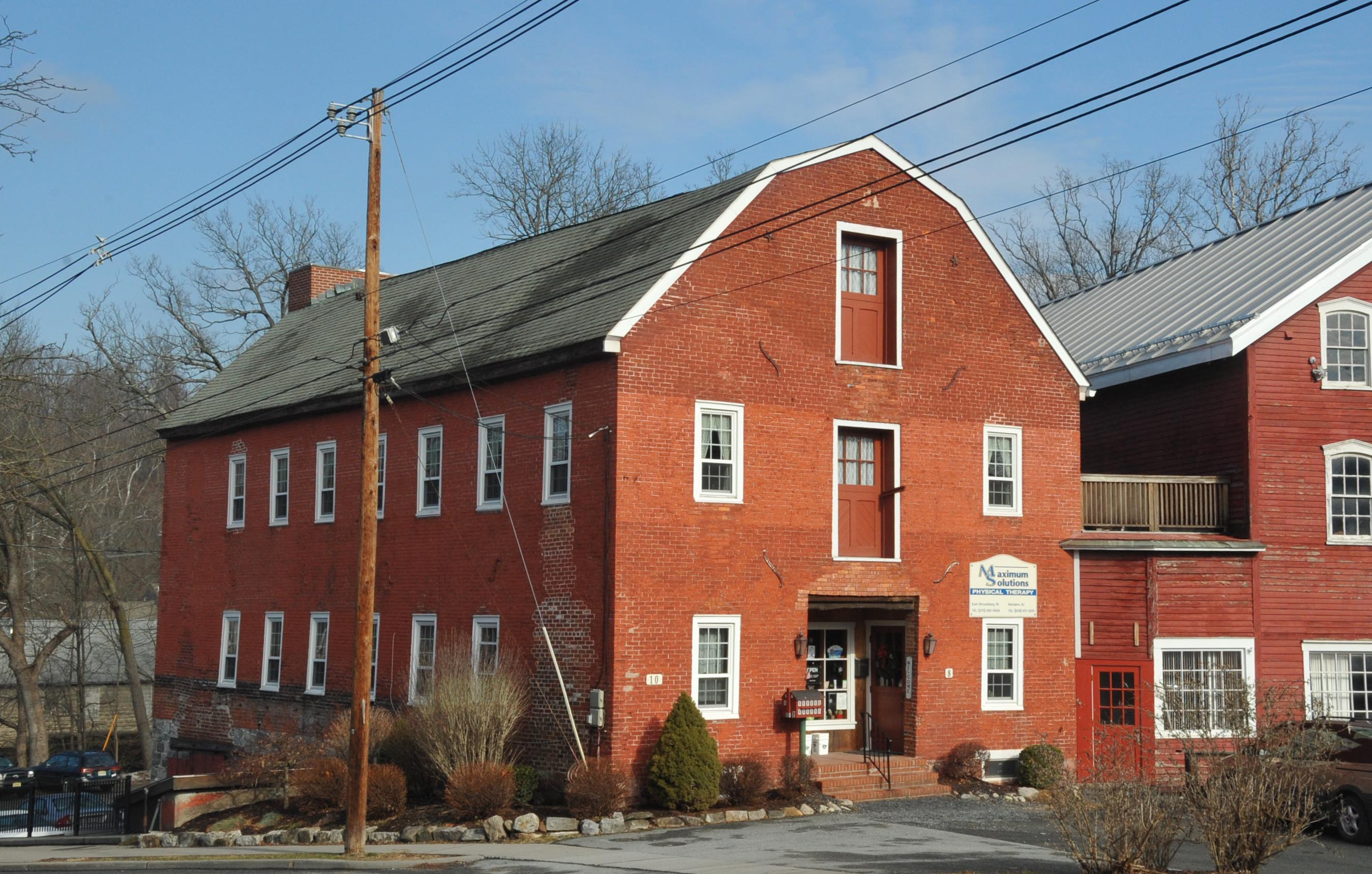
Twin mills
