= Melville Amasa Scovell =

American academic (1855–1912)

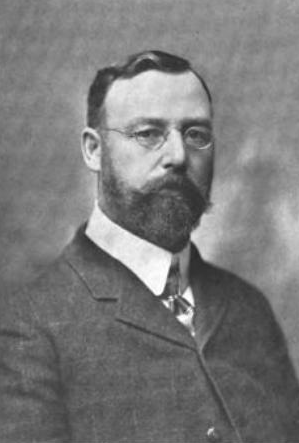
- Born: February 26, 1855; Belvidere, New Jersey
- Died: August 15, 1912 (aged 57); Lexington, Kentucky
- Education: University of Illinois
- Occupation: Academic
- Spouse: Nancy Davis (m. 1880)

Melville Amasa Scovell (February 26, 1855 – August 15, 1912) was an American academic from New Jersey. Moving with his family to Champaign, Illinois early in his life, he attended the University of Illinois there, graduating in 1875. He worked at the school for the next seven years, until he was dismissed over a conduct violation. In 1885, he became director of the Kentucky Agricultural Experiment Station at the University of Kentucky. Scovell was named dean of the College of Agriculture, Food, and Environment there shortly before his death.

== Early years ==
Melville Amasa Scovell was born February 26, 1855, in Belvidere, New Jersey. Shortly after his birth, his family moved to Jasper County, Illinois. They later moved to Champaign, where his father worked as a principal. Scovell enrolled at the University of Illinois in 1871, studying chemistry. He graduated in 1875 and became an instructor there. From 1876 to 1877, he served as the secretary to university president John Milton Gregory.

== Early career ==
Scovell was named an assistant professor of chemistry in 1877, receiving a Master of science the next year. He was made professor of agricultural chemistry in 1880. He co-founded a method of clarifying cane sugar juice, but was forced to leave the university in 1882 because professors were expected to abstain from profiting from their research. Scovell founded a sugar factory in Champaign, but it was short-lived. He also worked as a special agent of the US Department of Agriculture following his dismissal.

== Career ==
In 1885, Scovell accepted a position at the Kentucky Agricultural Experiment Station at the University of Kentucky in Lexington, a position he held until his death. There, he promoted agriculture in Kentucky, with a focus on Jersey cattle. James Ben Ali Haggin commissioned Scovell to purchase cattle for his Elmendorf Farm. In 1893, Scovell was chairman of the dairy test at the World's Columbian Exposition in Chicago. He was awarded a Ph.D. by the University of Illinois in 1909. In 1911, Scovell was named dean of the University of Kentucky College of Agriculture, Food, and Environment. Scovell served terms as president of the American Association of Agricultural Colleges and Experiment Stations and the Association of Official Agricultural Chemists. He was also a member of the Fair Committee of the Kentucky State Fair from 1907, when it moved to Louisville, until his death. He was a member of the Society of Chemical Industry and the American Chemical Society. He is the namesake of Scovell Hall at the University of Kentucky.

== Death ==
Scovell died at his Lexington home from endocarditis on August 15, 1912.

== Family life ==
He married Nancy Davis, a member of his university class, in Monticello, Illinois on September 8, 1880; they had no children.
