= List of New Jersey placenames of Native American origin =

The following list includes settlements, geographic features, and political subdivisions of New Jersey whose names are derived from Native American languages.

== Listings ==
=== Counties ===
- Passaic County

=== Settlements ===
- Absecon
- Acquackanonk Township
- Allamuchy Township (Lenape: Alemuchink)
- Alloway Township
- Almonesson (part of Deptford Township))
- Apshawa (part of West Milford)
- Atsion Village
- Batsto Village
- Cheesequake (part of Old Bridge Township) (Lenape: Chiskhakink)
- Cinnaminson Township
- Communipaw
- Cohansey Township
- Conaskonk Point (part of Union Beach) (Lenape: Kwënàskunk)
- Crosswicks
- Croton (part of Delaware Township)
- Cupsaw (part of Ringwood)
- Espanong (part of Jefferson Township)
- Hackensack
- Hoboken (Lenape: Hupokàn)
- Hockhockson (part of Tinton Falls)
- Ho-Ho-Kus
- Hopatcong
- Locktown (part of Delaware Township)
- Lopatcong Township
- Macopin
- Mahwah
- Manahawkin
- Manalapan Township
- Mannington Township
- Mantoloking
- Mantua Township
- Matawan
- Metuchen
- Navesink
- Neshanic
- Netcong
- Normanook (part of Sandyston Township)
- Nummytown (part of Middle Township)
- Old Tappan
- Packanack Lake
- Pahaquarry Township
- Paramus
- Parsippany
- Passaic
- Peahala Park (part of Long Beach Township)
- Peapack-Gladstone
- Pennsauken Township
- Pequannock
- Perth Amboy
- Piscataway Township
- Pohatcong Township
- Pompton Lakes
- Pompton Plains
- Pompton Township
- Preakness
- Rahway
- Ramapo
- Raritan
- Raritan Township
- Repaupo (part of Logan Township)
- Rockaway
- Rockaway Creek
- Rockaway River
- Rumson
- Secaucus
- Shamong Township
- Sicomac
- Singac (part of Little Falls)
- South Amboy
- Squankum (part of Howell Township and also the original name of Williamstown)
- Succasunna
- Teaneck
- Totowa
- Towaco
- Tuckahoe (Lenape: Takeho)
- Walpack Township
- Wanamassa
- Wanaque
- Watchung
- Weehawken
  - Weehawken Cove
- Weequahic
  - Weequahic Park
- Wenonah
- Whippany
- Wickatunk (part of Marlboro Township) (Lenape: Wikwètunk)
- Wyckoff

=== Bodies of water ===
- Absecon Inlet
- Absecon Island
- Alexauken Creek (tributary of the Delaware River in Hunterdon County) (Lenape: Alàxhakink)
- Assunpink Creek (Lenape: Ahsën'pink)
- Assiscunk Creek
- Lake Atsion
- Batsto River
- Campgaw Mountain
- Capoolong Creek (tributary of South Branch Raritan River)
- Cheesequake State Park
- Chincopin Branch (tributary of the Manumuskin River in Cumberland County)
- Chingarora Creek
- Cohansey River
- Crosswicks Creek
- Cupsaw Lake
- Cushetunk Mountain
- Hakihokake Creek (tributary of Delaware River in Hunterdon County)
- Hockhockson Swamp
- Lake Hopatcong
- Iosco (part of Bloomingdale)
- Lake Iosco
- Kittatinny Mountains (Lenape: Kitahtëne)
- Lamington
- Lamington River
- Loantaka Brook
- Lockatong Creek
- Luppatatong Creek
- Macanippuck Run (tributary of Delaware River in Cumberland County) (Lenape: Mèkënipèk)
- Machesautauxen Creek, alternate name for the Sleeper Branch (tributary of Mullica River)
- Mahoras Brook
- Manapaqua Branch (stream in Ocean County)
- Manasquan
- Manasquan River (Lenape: Mënàskunk)
- Manantico Creek
- Mannington Creek
- Manumuskin River
- Manunka Chunk (location on the border of White Township and Knowlton Township) (Lenape: Mënànkahchunk)
- Mashipacong Island (river island in the Delaware River)
- Matchaponix Brook
- Mattano Park
- Metedeconk River
- Mingamahone Brook (tributary of the Manasquan River in Monmouth County)
- Minisink
- Mount Mohepinoke (located on the border of Liberty Township and White Township)
- Moonachie
- Moosepac Pond (located in Jefferson Township)
- Muksukemuk, native name for Deep Voll Brook
- Mulhockaway Creek (a tributary of the South Branch Raritan River via Spruce Run in Hunterdon County)
- Musconetcong Mountain
- Musconetcong River
- Muskee Creek (tributary of the Maurice River in Cumberland County)
- Muskingum Brook (tributary of the Batsto River via Springers Brook in Burlington County)
- Musquapsink Brook
- Nacote Creek (tributary of the Mullica River in Atlantic County)
- Nantuxent Creek
- Navesink River
- Nescochague Creek
- Neshanic River
- Nishisakawick Creek and Little Nishisakawick Creek (tributaries of the Delaware River in Frenchtown, Hunterdon County)
- Nihomus Run (tributary of the Salem River in Salem County)
- Nishuane Brook (tributary of the Second River in Essex County)
- Nomahegan Brook (tributary of the Rahway River in Union County)
- Normanook Brook alt. Normanock Brook (tributary of Big Flat Brook in Sandyston Township, Sussex County)
- Oranoaken Creek
- Packanack Mountain
- Papakating Creek
- Pascack Brook
- Pascack Valley
- Passaic River
- Patcong Creek (tributary of Great Egg Harbor in Atlantic County)
- Paunpeck Creek (tributary of the Hackensack River via Cromakill Creek in North Bergen, Hudson County)
- Peckman River
- Pennsauken Creek
- Pequest River
- Picatinny Arsenal
- Pochuck Creek
- Pochuck Mountain
- Pohatcong Creek
- Pohatcong Mountain
- Pompeston Creek (tributary of the Delaware River in Burlington County)
- Pompton River
- Pophandusing Brook (tributary of the Delaware River in Warren County)
- Preakness Range
- Rahway River
- Ramapo Mountains
- Ramapo River
- Rancocas Creek
- Raritan Bay
- Raritan River
- Sanhickan, native name for the falls of the Delaware River at Trenton
- Shabakunk Creek, West Branch Shabakunk Creek, and Little Shabakunk Creek
- Shannoc Brook (tributary of Toms River in Ocean County)
- Shipetaukin Creek (feeder stream of the D&R Canal in Mercer County)
- Mount Tammany
- Tantomwom, the native name for Long Hill.
- Tulpehocken Creek
- Upper Pohatcong Mountain
- Waackaack Creek alt. Waycake Creek (tributary of Raritan Bay in Monmouth County –its name is given to the Waackaack Rear Range Light)
- Wagaraw Brook
- Wagaraw Mountain
- Wampum Brook (tributary of Shrewsbury River in Monmouth County)
- Wanaque River
- Watchung Mountains
- Warinanco Park
- Watnong Mountain (located in Parsippany-Troy Hills)
- Watsessing Park
- Watsessing River
- Waughaw Mountain (located in Montville Township)
- Wawayanda Creek
- Wawayanda Mountain
- Wawayanda State Park
- Weamaconk Creek (tributary of Matchaponix Brook in Monmouth County)
- Wemrock Brook (tributary of Matchaponix Brook via Weamaconk Creek in Monmouth County)
- Wesickaman Creek (tributary of the Mullica River in Burlington County)
- Westecunk Creek
- Whippany River
- Wickecheoke Creek
- Windbeam Mountain (located in Ringwood)
- Yantacaw Brook (tributary of the Third River in Montclair, Essex County)
- Yantacaw Brook Park

== See also ==
- List of place names of Native American origin in the United States
