= Pohatcong =

Pohatcong may refer to the following in the U.S. state of New Jersey:

- Pohatcong Creek, also called the Pohatcong River, a tributary of the Delaware River
- Pohatcong Mountain, a ridge in the Appalachian Mountains of northwestern New Jersey
- Pohatcong Township, New Jersey
