= Yantacaw =

Yantacaw, or Yanticaw may refer to the following in the U.S. state of New Jersey:

- Yantacaw Brook, a tributary of the Third River
- Yantacaw Brook Park, New Jersey, in Montclair
- Yantacaw Elementary School, in Nutley
- Yanticaw Park, a county park in Nutley
