= Lower Squankum, New Jersey =

Populated place in Monmouth County, New Jersey, US

- Unincorporated community
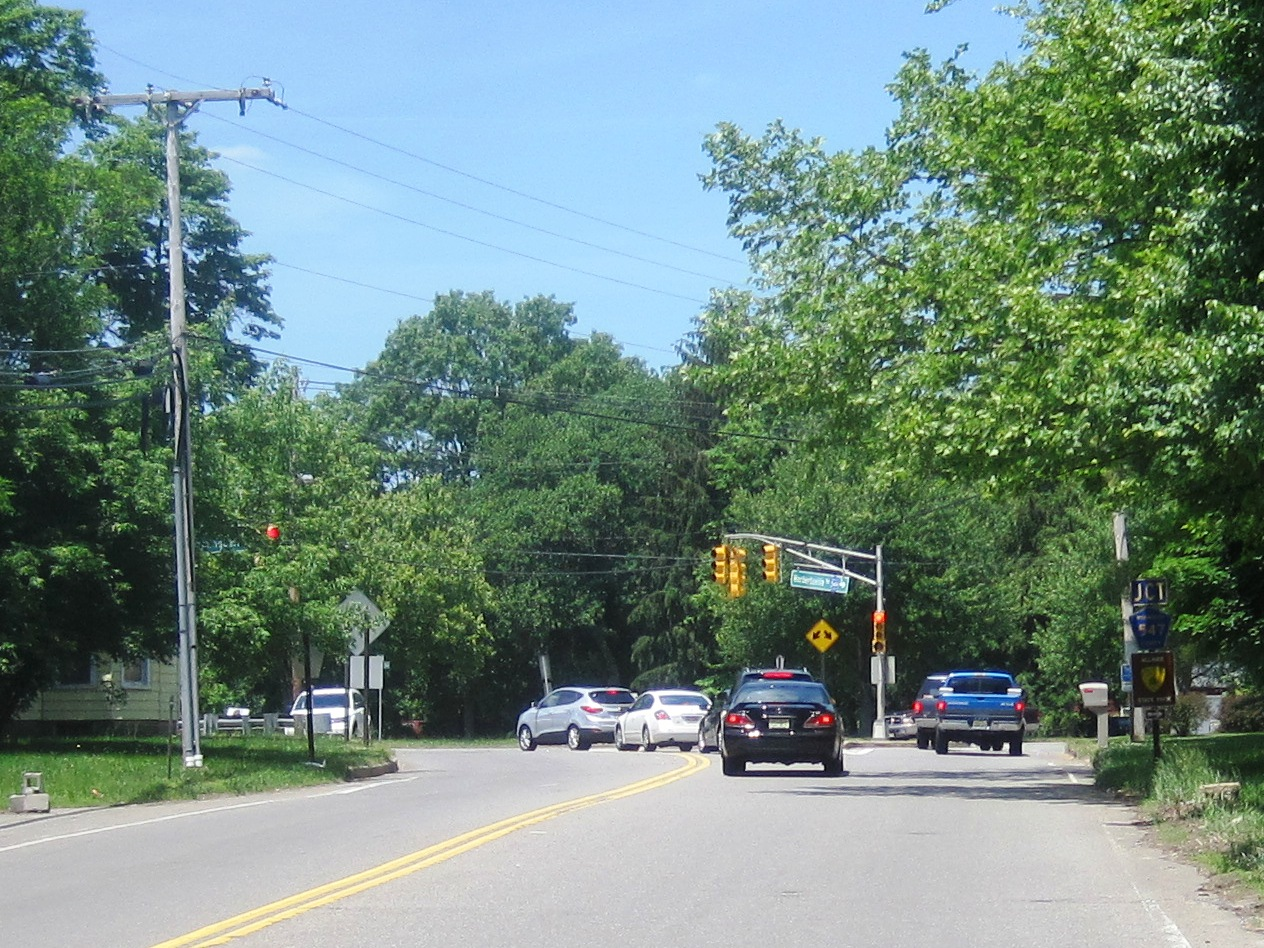
- Approaching CR 547 on Herbertsville Road (CR 549) in Lower Squankum

- Location in Monmouth County. Inset: Location of county within the state of New Jersey Lower Squankum (New Jersey) Lower Squankum (the United States)
- Coordinates: 40°09′31″N 74°09′25″W
- Country: United States
- State: New Jersey
- County: Monmouth
- Township: Howell
- Elevation: 43 ft (13 m)
- GNIS feature ID: 877973

Lower Squankum is an unincorporated community located within Howell Township in Monmouth County, in the U.S. state of New Jersey. The settlement is situated along Lakewood-Farmingdale Road (County Route 547) at its intersection with Herbertsville Road (CR 549) and Old Tavern Road (CR 21) on the eastern side of Howell Township. It is just south of Interstate 195 exit 31 and borders Allaire State Park.

== History ==
The name "Squankum" derives from a Lenape term meaning "place of evil ghosts" or "place of evil spirits," a common naming convention among Native Americans in the region.

During the 19th century, Lower Squankum developed around an agrarian economy and milling industries. The Lower Squankum Mill, located on the Manasquan River, served local farmers by grinding grain into flour. The site was historically owned by Solomon Wardell, one of Howell’s early landowners.

== Landmarks ==
=== Lower Squankum Mill Site ===
The remnants of the 19th-century Lower Squankum Mill are located at the junction of CR 547 and CR 549. The site is considered a significant example of rural industrial history and was the subject of a cultural resources survey by the New Jersey Department of Transportation.

=== Lower Squankum Friends Burial Ground ===
This historic Quaker cemetery is located in the median of CR 547. Established in 1778, it contains an estimated 130 to 150 marked and unmarked graves, some of which belong to Civil War veterans.

== Geography and Environment ==
Lower Squankum is located adjacent to Allaire State Park, a protected natural area that includes hiking trails, the historic Allaire Village, and access to the Manasquan River.

== Transportation ==
Lower Squankum is served by:

- CR 547 – Lakewood-Farmingdale Road
- CR 549 – Herbertsville Road
- CR 21 – Old Tavern Road
- Interstate 195, with Exit 31 nearby

Bus service is provided along Route 9 and nearby arteries by NJ Transit and Academy Bus Lines, offering commuter access to New York City and Trenton.

== See also ==
- Squankum, New Jersey
- List of place names of Native American origin in New Jersey
- Howell Township, New Jersey
