= Hixson–Mixsell House =

- U.S. National Register of Historic Places
- New Jersey Register of Historic Places
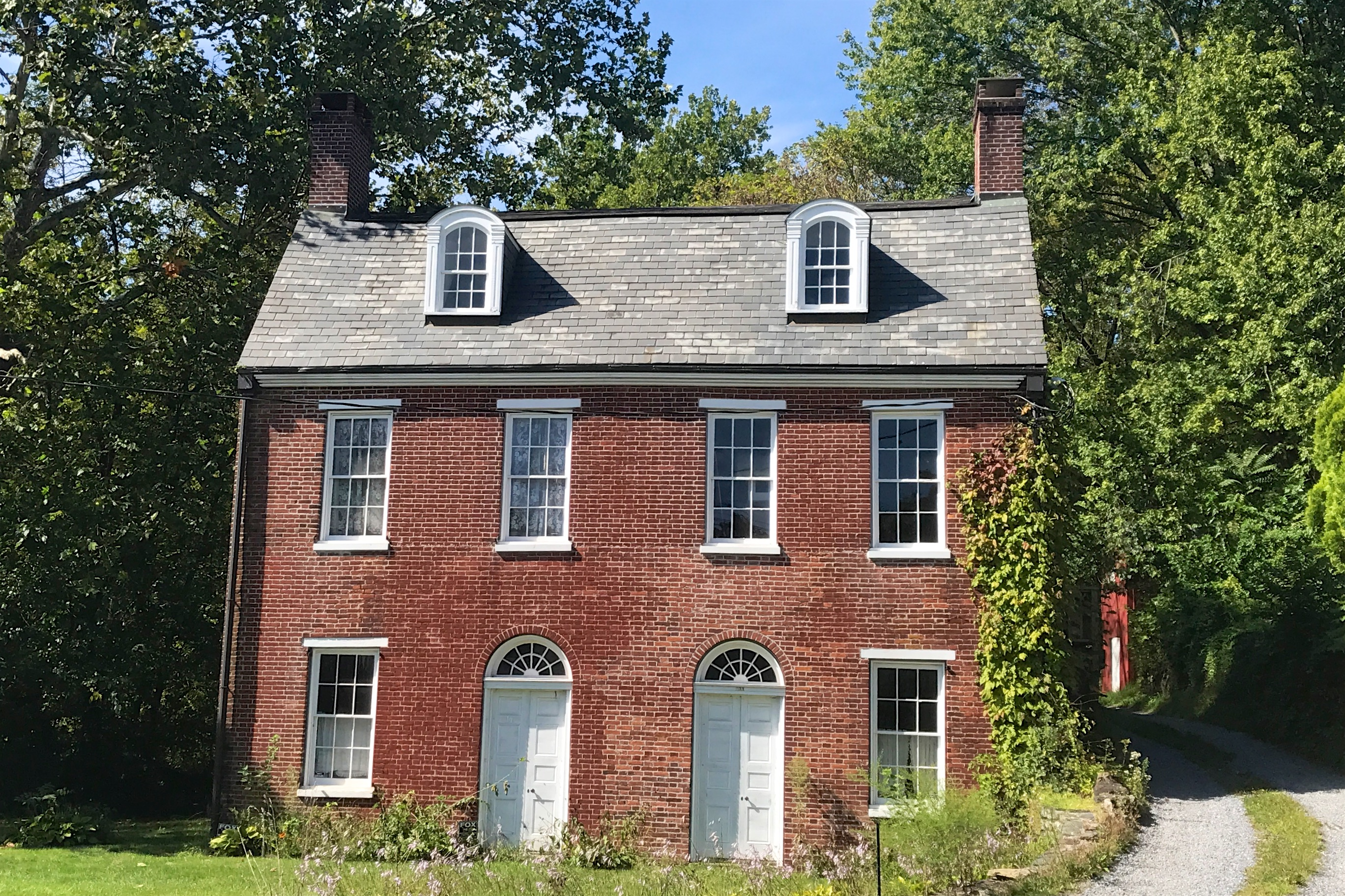
- Hixson–Mixsell House in 2017

- Location within Warren County, New Jersey Location within New Jersey Location within the United States
- Location: 157 County Route 519, Springtown, Pohatcong Township, New Jersey
- Coordinates: 40°38′52″N 75°08′54″W
- Area: 0.38 acres (0.15 ha)
- Architectural style: Federal, Greek Revival
- NRHP reference No.: 14000204
- NJRHP No.: 5417

Significant dates
- Added to NRHP: May 12, 2014
- Designated NJRHP: February 19, 2014

The Hixson–Mixsell House, also known as the Springtown Stagecoach Inn, is a historic building at 157 County Route 519 in the village of Springtown, in Pohatcong Township, Warren County, New Jersey. The main block was built c. 1836–1840, with a rear wing built between c. 1790 and 1840. It was added to the National Register of Historic Places on May 12, 2014 for its significance in architecture.

== History ==
In the 1760s, a land tract along the Pohatcong Creek, including the site of this house and the future village of Springtown, was purchased by Joseph Hixson. By 1801, Hixson had built a residence, sawmill, and gristmill here. After his death, the property was sold in 1814 to Jacob Mixsell and his son John. They built a distillery here. In 1836, Jacob sold the property to his son, David Mixsell, who later built the brick portion of this house.

== Description ==
The main block is a two and one-half story brick building with Federal and Greek Revival styles and featuring Flemish bond on the east and south walls. The western half of the rear wing uses plank frame construction.

== Gallery ==
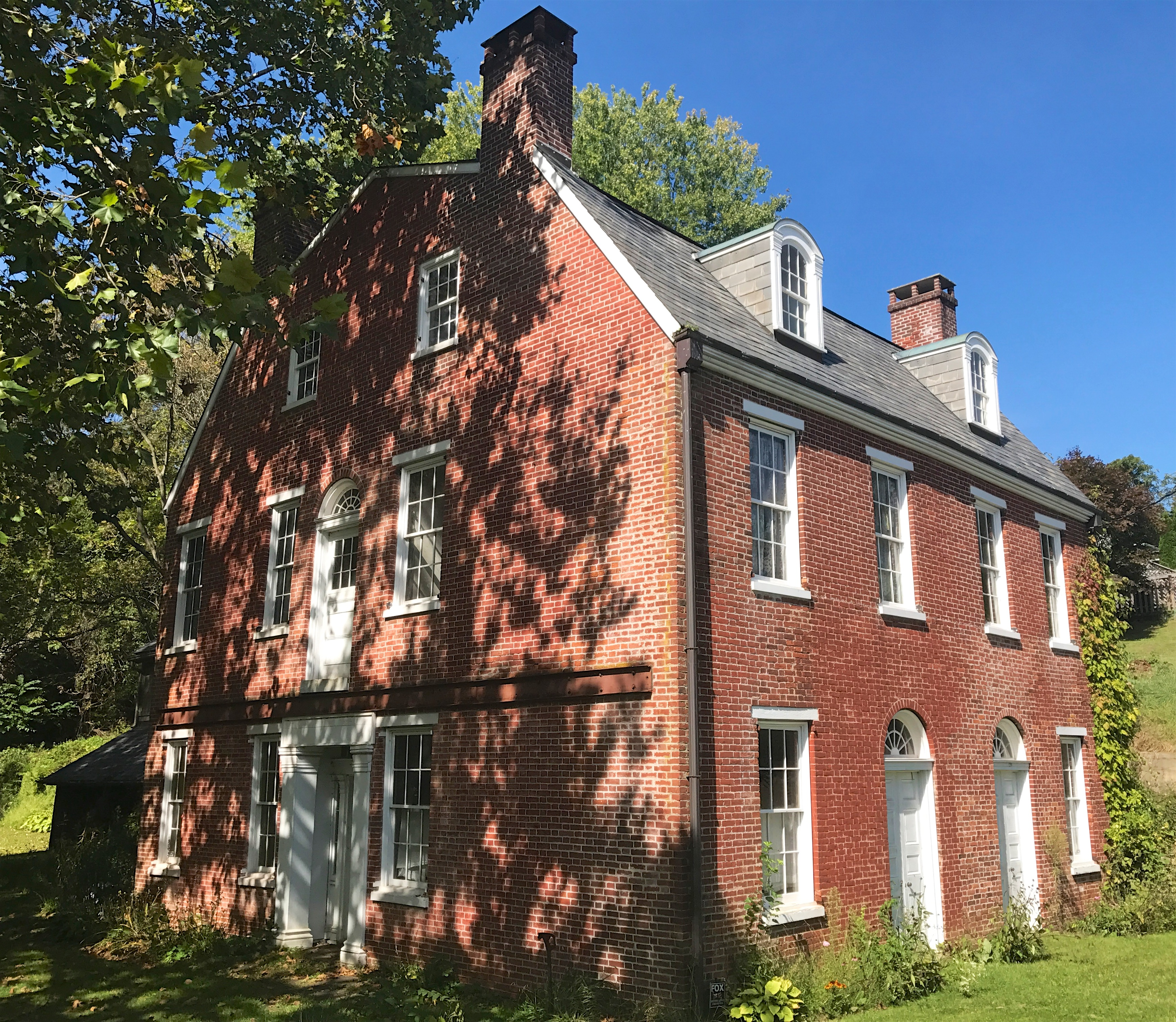
Side view

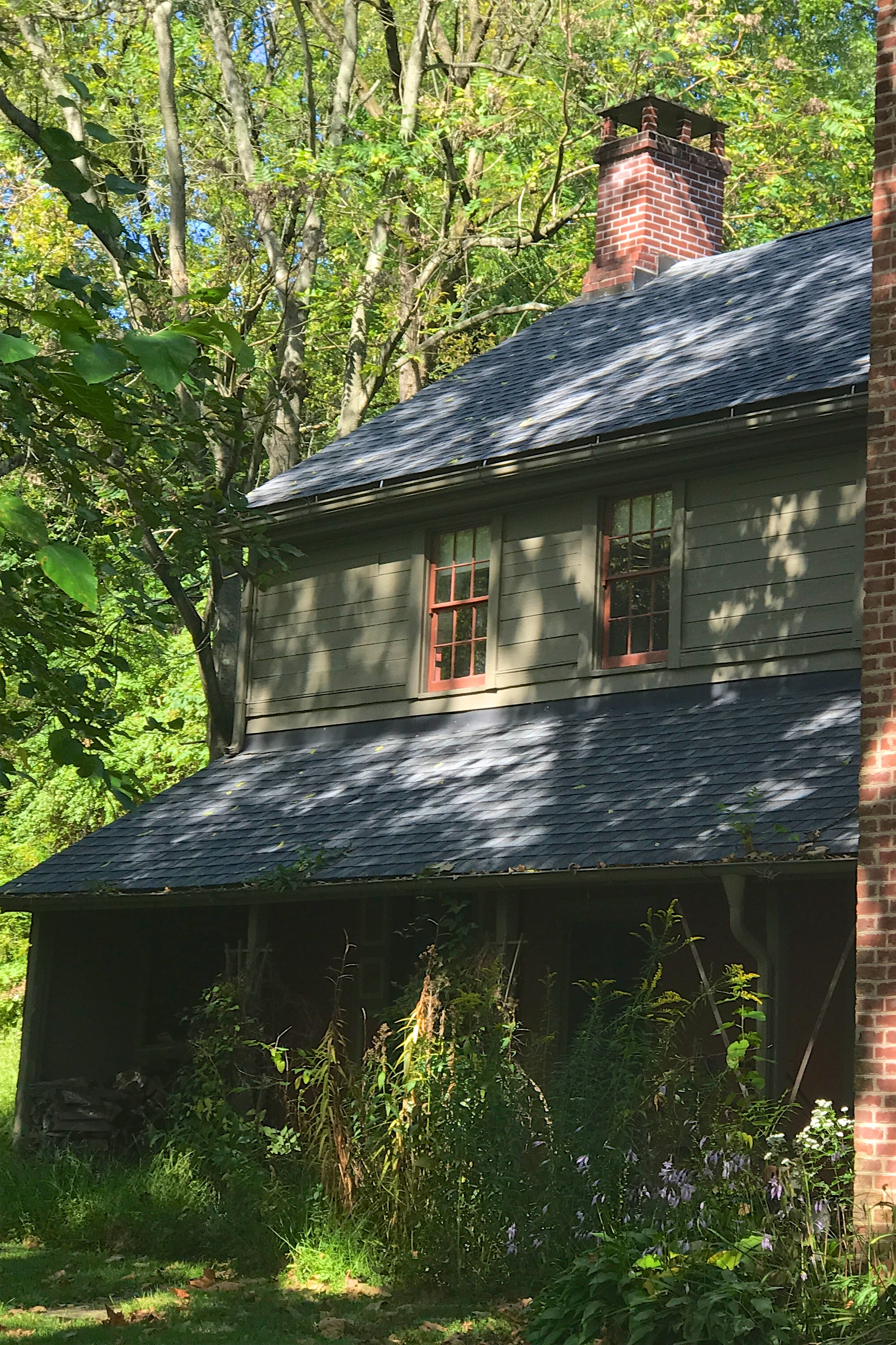
Rear wing

== See also ==
- Hixson–Skinner Mill Complex
