= Hixson–Skinner Mill Complex =

- U.S. National Register of Historic Places
- New Jersey Register of Historic Places
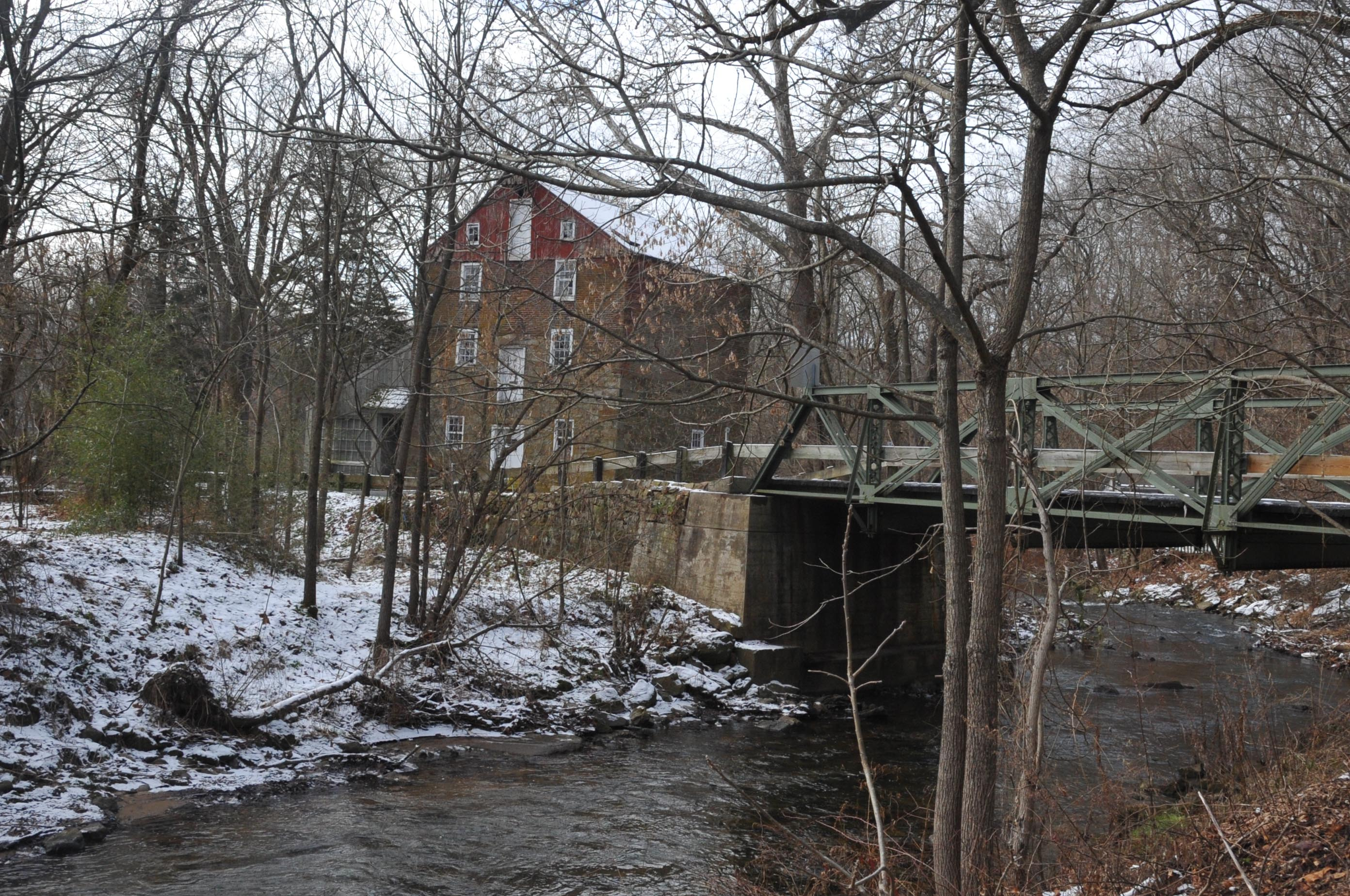
- Mill and bridge over the Pohatcong Creek
- Location: Still Valley Road, Pohatcong Township, New Jersey
- Nearest city: Phillipsburg, New Jersey
- Coordinates: 40°39′16″N 75°08′10″W
- Area: 2.5 acres (1.0 ha)
- NRHP reference No.: 82001047
- NJRHP No.: 2790

Significant dates
- Added to NRHP: December 2, 1982
- Designated NJRHP: October 1, 1982

The Hixson–Skinner Mill Complex, also known as Cole's Grist Mill Complex, encompasses a historic grist mill and two houses located where Still Valley Road crosses the Pohatcong Creek, about one half mile east of Springtown, in Pohatcong Township in Warren County, New Jersey, United States. It was added to the National Register of Historic Places on December 2, 1982, for its significance in commerce and industry. The 2.5-acre (1.0 ha) district includes four contributing buildings and two contributing structures.

== History and description ==
There was a mill on the Pohatcong Creek at this site as early as 1764, when Thomas Peterson bought the property. He sold it to Robert Kennedy in 1780. There were multiple mills on the property, but they had burned down by 1793. Kennedy sold the property to Abraham Brunner in 1796, who in turn sold it to John Allshouse in 1798. The current mill was built by Allshouse sometime after 1825. In 1847, John Hixson bought the mill property. In 1851, he sold it to Charles C. Hixson and Ephramin Dalton. John Hixson later rebought the property and started a distilling operation. In 1874, the property was purchased by Charles and Peter Skinner, who operated a successful grist mill operation. In 1924, William Cole purchased the current property. In 1974, the mill was converted to electrical power from water power. The listing includes the mill, a miller's house, garage, a guest house, and a small bridge.

== See also ==
- National Register of Historic Places listings in Warren County, New Jersey
- Hixson–Mixsell House
