= Riegelsville, New Jersey =

Populated place in Warren County, New Jersey, US

- Unincorporated community
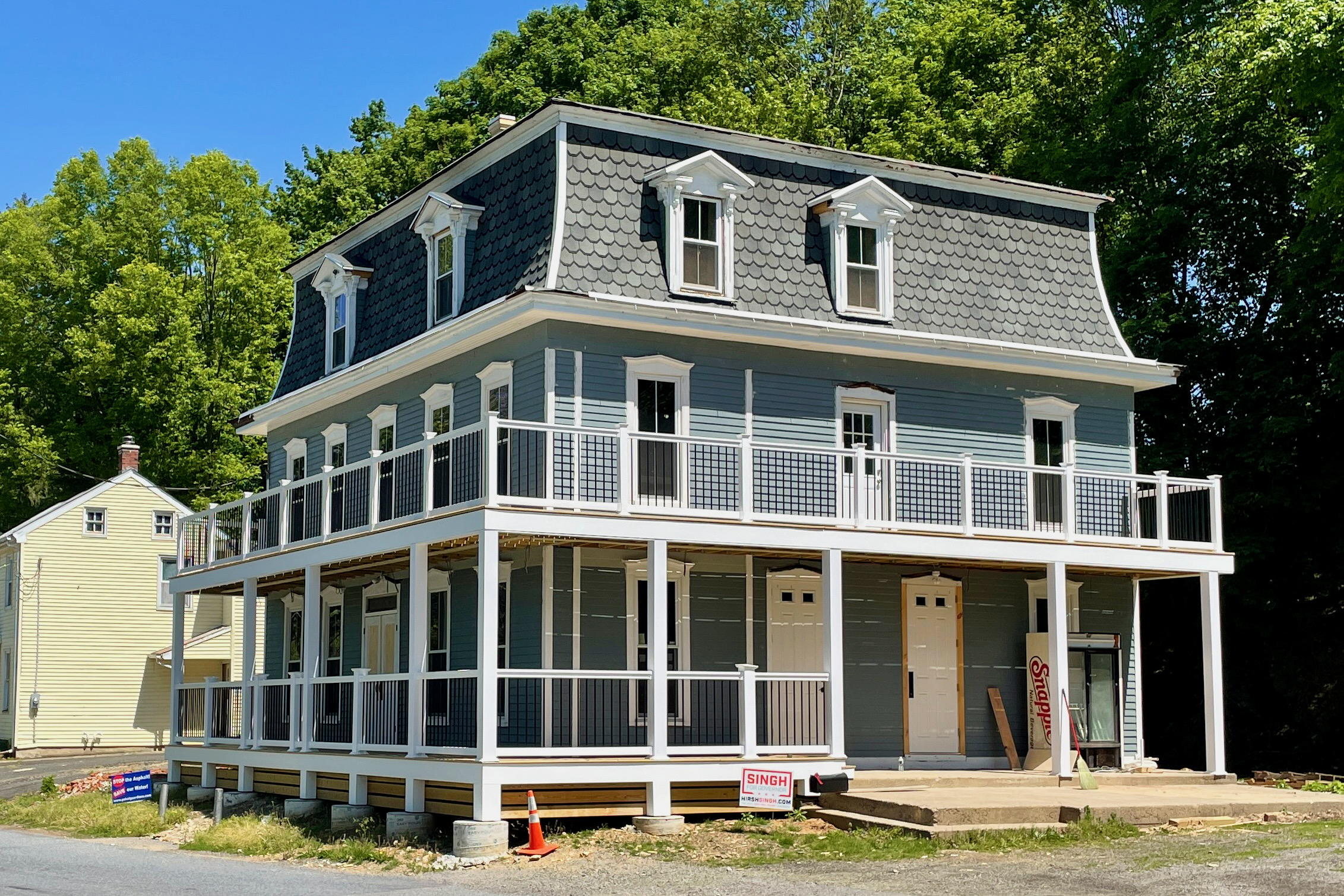
- Riverside Hotel on River Road

- Riegelsivlle in Warren County, New Jersey Riegelsville (New Jersey) Riegelsville (the United States)
- Coordinates: 40°35′40″N 75°11′14″W
- Country: United States
- State: New Jersey
- County: Warren
- Township: Pohatcong
- GNIS feature ID: 879691

Riegelsville is an unincorporated community located in Pohatcong Township in Warren County, New Jersey. It is connected to Riegelsville, Pennsylvania across the Delaware River by the Riegelsville Bridge at the confluence of the Musconetcong River with the Delaware River.

The Riegelsville Company Town Historic District encompassing the community was listed in the New Jersey Register of Historic Places in 1998.

== Transportation ==
Warren County Route 627, also known as Riegelsville Milford Road and Riegelsville Warren Glen Road, runs north-south through the community.

A tourist railroad that operates on the Belvidere and Delaware River Railway terminates near the Riegelsville Bridge.

== See also ==
- National Register of Historic Places listings in Warren County, New Jersey
- George Hunt House
