= Springtown, New Jersey =

Springtown is the name of several communities in the U.S. state of New Jersey:

- Springtown, Cumberland County, New Jersey
- Springtown, Warren County, New Jersey
