= Upper Pohatcong, New Jersey =

Populated place in Warren County, New Jersey, US

- Census-designated place
- Location in Warren County Location in New Jersey Location in the United States
- Coordinates: 40.677469°N 75.155801°W
- Country: United States
- State: New Jersey
- County: Warren
- Township: Pohatcong

Area
  - Total: 0.64 sq mi (1.67 km^{2})
  - Land: 0.64 sq mi (1.67 km^{2})
  - Water: 0 sq mi (0.00 km^{2}) 0.00%
- Elevation: 308 ft (94 m)

Population (2020)
  - Total: 1,714
  - Density: 2,650/sq mi (1,024/km^{2})
- Time zone: UTC−05:00 (Eastern (EST))
  - Summer (DST): UTC−04:00 (EDT)
- Area code: 908
- FIPS code: 34-75120
- GNIS feature ID: 02584035

Upper Pohatcong is an unincorporated community and census-designated place (CDP) located within Pohatcong Township in Warren County, in the U.S. state of New Jersey, that was defined as part of the 2010 United States census. As of the 2020 census, Upper Pohatcong had a population of 1,714.

== Geography ==
According to the United States Census Bureau, the CDP had a total area of 0.656 square miles (1.700 km^{2}), all of which was land.

== Demographics ==
Historical population
Census	Pop.	Note	%±
2010	1,781		—
2020	1,714		−3.8%
U.S. Decennial Census

Upper Pohatcong first appeared as a census designated place in the 2010 U.S. census.

=== 2020 census ===
Upper Pohatcong CDP, New Jersey – Racial and ethnic composition Note: the US Census treats Hispanic/Latino as an ethnic category. This table excludes Latinos from the racial categories and assigns them to a separate category. Hispanics/Latinos may be of any race.
Race / Ethnicity (NH = Non-Hispanic)	Pop 2010	Pop 2020	% 2010	% 2020
White alone (NH)	1,630	1,438	91.52%	83.90%
Black or African American alone (NH)	39	68	2.19%	3.97%
Native American or Alaska Native alone (NH)	0	0	0.00%	0.00%
Asian alone (NH)	19	26	1.07%	1.52%
Native Hawaiian or Pacific Islander alone (NH)	0	1	0.00%	0.06%
Other race alone (NH)	1	1	0.06%	0.06%
Mixed race or Multiracial (NH)	23	69	1.29%	4.03%
Hispanic or Latino (any race)	69	111	3.87%	6.48%
Total	1,781	1,714	100.00%	100.00%

=== 2010 census ===
The 2010 United States census counted 1,781 people, 699 households, and 501 families in the CDP. The population density was 2,713.1 per square mile (1,047.5/km^{2}). There were 732 housing units at an average density of 1,115.1 per square mile (430.5/km^{2}). The racial makeup was 94.61% (1,685) White, 2.19% (39) Black or African American, 0.00% (0) Native American, 1.07% (19) Asian, 0.00% (0) Pacific Islander, 0.28% (5) from other races, and 1.85% (33) from two or more races. Hispanic or Latino of any race were 3.87% (69) of the population.

Of the 699 households, 28.9% had children under the age of 18; 59.4% were married couples living together; 8.4% had a female householder with no husband present and 28.3% were non-families. Of all households, 24.2% were made up of individuals and 13.0% had someone living alone who was 65 years of age or older. The average household size was 2.55 and the average family size was 3.05.

22.2% of the population were under the age of 18, 6.9% from 18 to 24, 24.3% from 25 to 44, 30.1% from 45 to 64, and 16.5% who were 65 years of age or older. The median age was 42.7 years. For every 100 females, the population had 98.3 males. For every 100 females ages 18 and older there were 91.2 males.
