= Squankum, New Jersey =

Populated place in Monmouth County, New Jersey, US

- Unincorporated community
- Location of Squankum in Monmouth County Inset: Location of county within the state of New Jersey Squankum (New Jersey) Squankum (the United States)
- Coordinates: 40°09′58″N 74°09′14″W
- Country: United States
- State: New Jersey
- County: Monmouth
- Township: Howell
- Elevation: 43 ft (13 m)
- Time zone: UTC−05:00 (Eastern (EST))
  - Summer (DST): UTC−04:00 (EDT)
- GNIS feature ID: 880830

Squankum (Lenape for "place of evil ghosts" or "place where evil spirits dwell") is an unincorporated community located within Howell Township in Monmouth County, in the U.S. state of New Jersey. The name Squankum was used for a town in Gloucester County, which was changed to present day Williamstown (see note above), due to postal regulations that prohibited the two towns from having the same name.

== Description ==
Located within Howell Township, Squankum is near Allaire State Park. Major county roads in Squankum include CR 524 and CR 547. I-195 provides access to Squankum, along with its neighboring town, Farmingdale, via exit 31B.

== See also ==
- Lower Squankum, New Jersey
- List of place names of Native American origin in New Jersey
