= Springtown, Warren County, New Jersey =

Populated place in Warren County, New Jersey, US

Springtown, New Jersey
- Unincorporated community
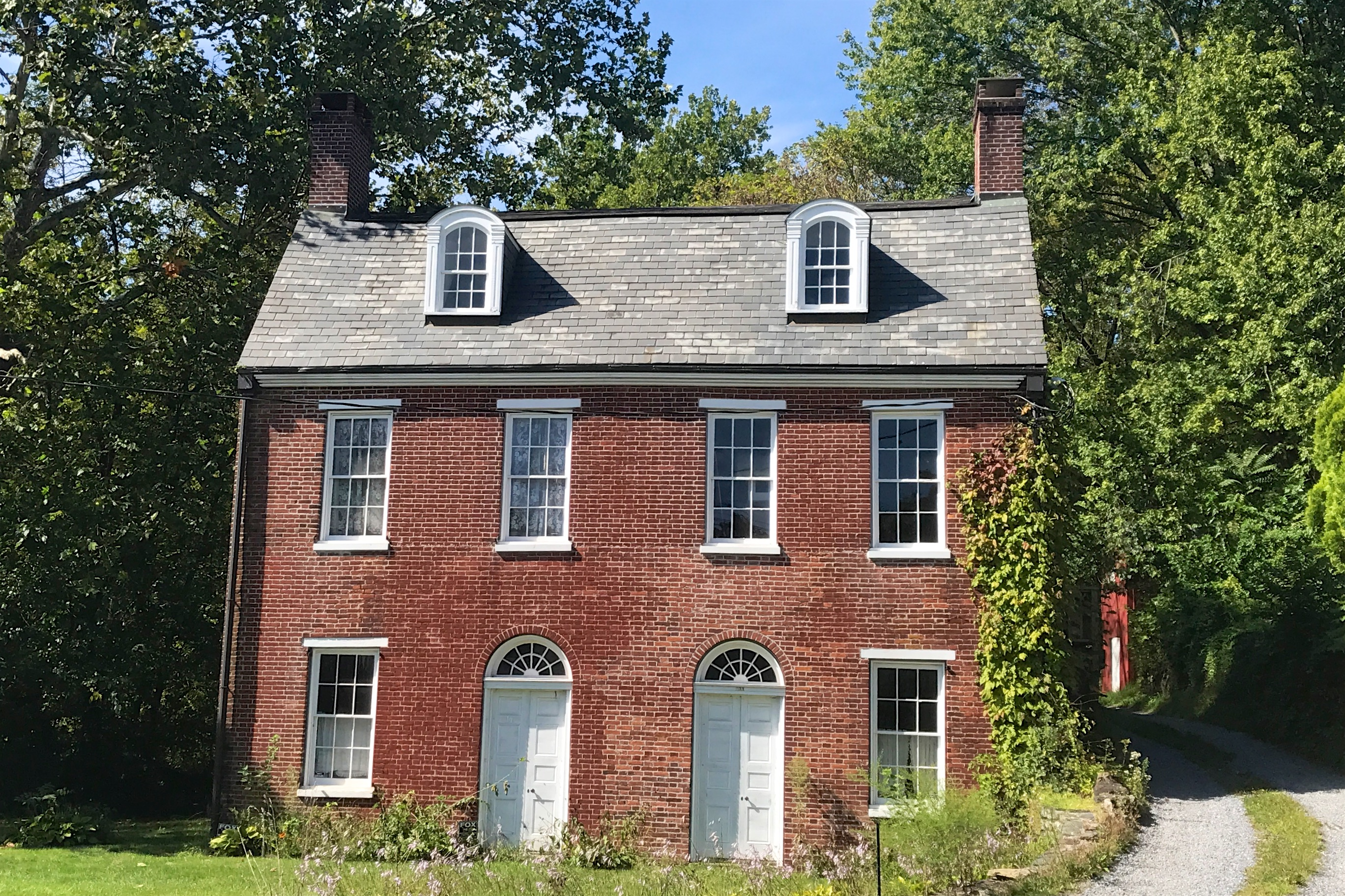
- Springtown Stagecoach Inn, listed on the National Register of Historic Places

- Location within Warren County, New Jersey Location within New Jersey Location within the United States
- Coordinates: 40°38′55″N 75°8′52″W
- Country: United States
- State: New Jersey
- County: Warren
- Township: Pohatcong
- Elevation: 200 ft (61 m)
- GNIS feature ID: 880823

Springtown is an unincorporated community located at the intersection of Springtown Road (County Route 519) and the Pohatcong Creek in Pohatcong Township, Warren County, New Jersey. It was named after the many small springs in the valley.

== History ==
In the 1850s, the village had two distilleries and three gristmills.

== Points of interest ==
The Hixson–Skinner Mill Complex, also known as Cole's Grist Mill Complex, was added to the National Register of Historic Places in 1982 for its significance in commerce and industry.

The Hixson–Mixsell House, also known as the Springtown Stagecoach Inn, was added to the NRHP in 2014 for its significance in architecture.
