= Yantacaw Brook =

Tributary of the Third River in New Jersey, United States

Yantacaw Brook is a tributary of the Third River in Essex County, New Jersey, United States. The brook rises in Montclair and then continues into the Third River in Bloomfield, New Jersey and then into Belleville and Nutley, where it enters the Passaic River. Both Yantacaw Brook and the Third River were referred to by the Lenape people as Yantokah or Yantacaw.

== Yanticaw Park ==
Yanticaw Park, through which the brook flows, is located in Nutley.

== Yantacaw Brook Park ==
Yantacaw Brook Park
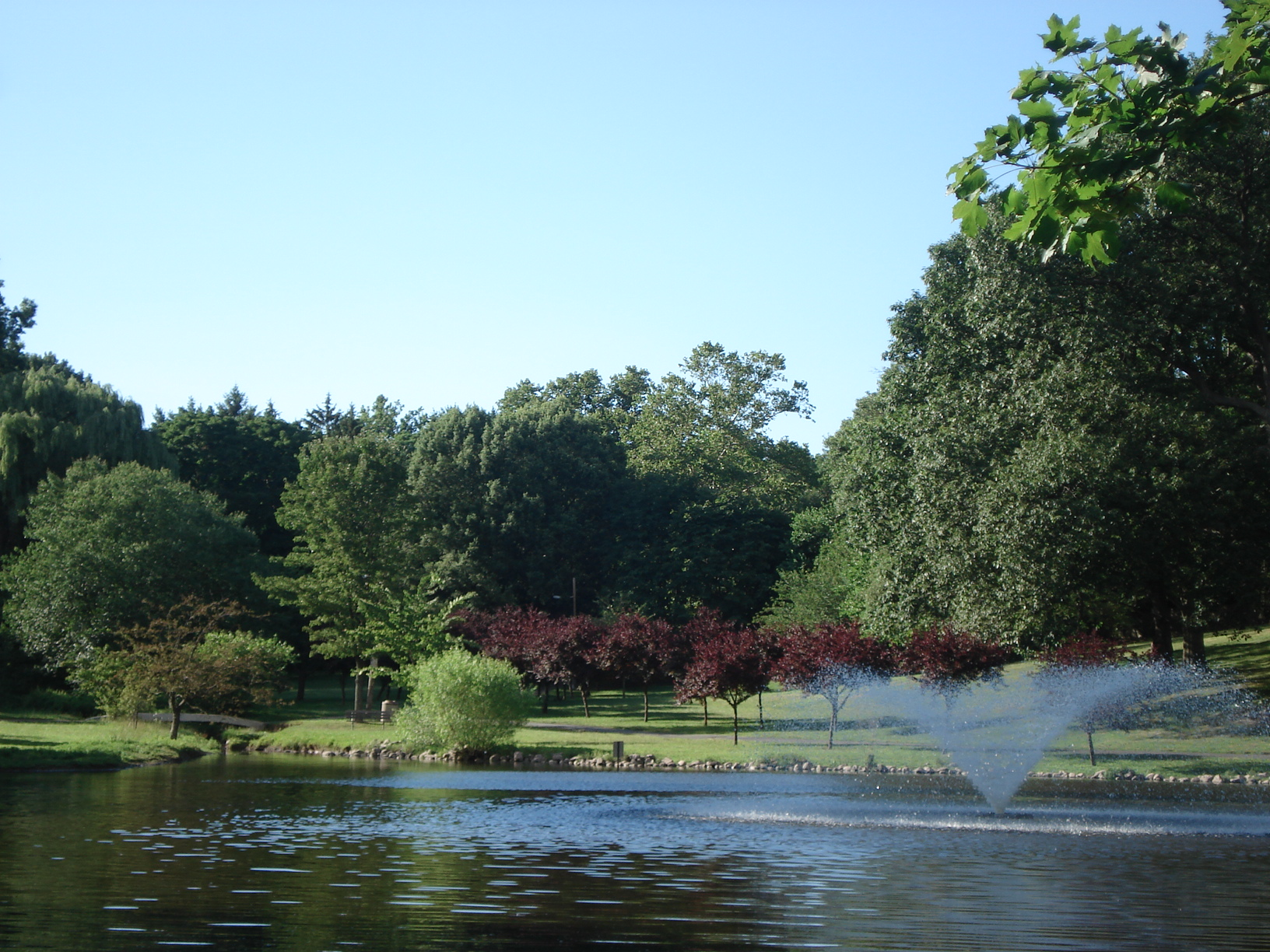
- Interactive map of Yantacaw Brook Park
- Location: Montclair, New Jersey
- Coordinates: 40.847093°N 74.178658°W
- Area: 11.5 acres (4.7 ha)
- Operator: Montclair Parks and Recreation

Yantacaw Brook Park is a town operated park located in Montclair. The park covers 11.5 acres (4.7 ha) of land. It has a small pond fed by the stream.

Yantacaw Brook Park

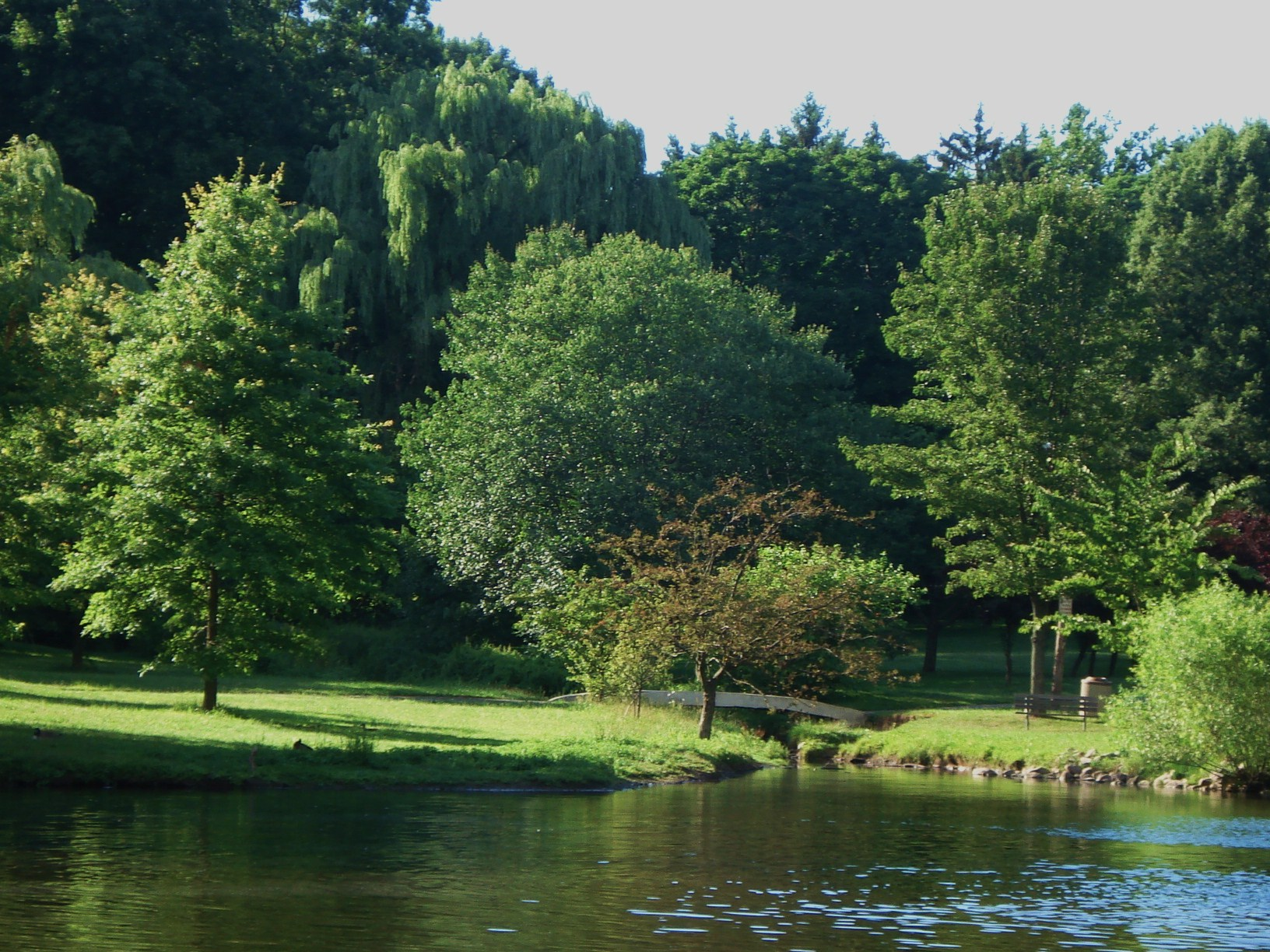
View of west end of the park where a small bridge goes over the Yantacaw Brook before flowing into the pond

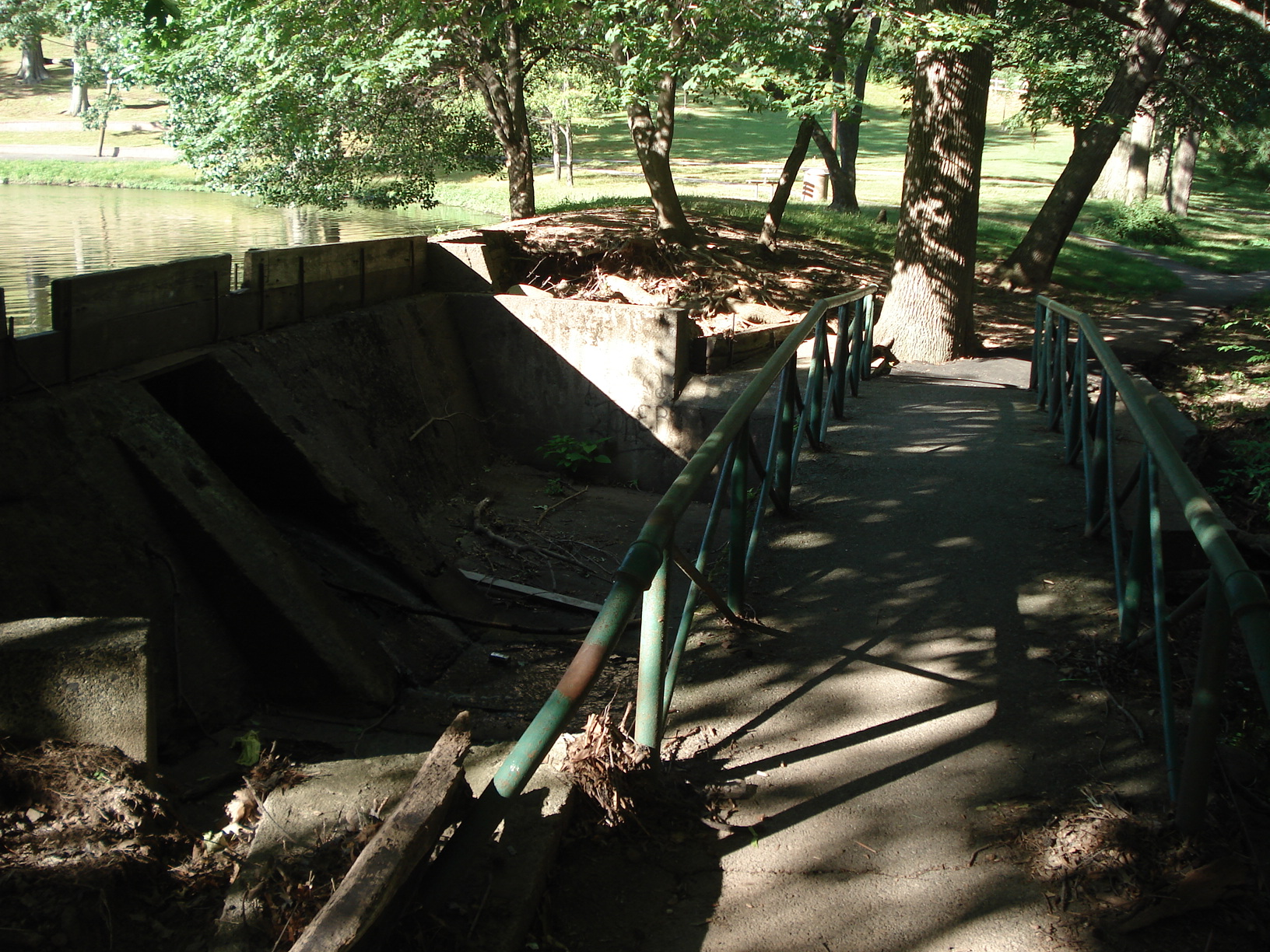
The dam which helps keep the pond full

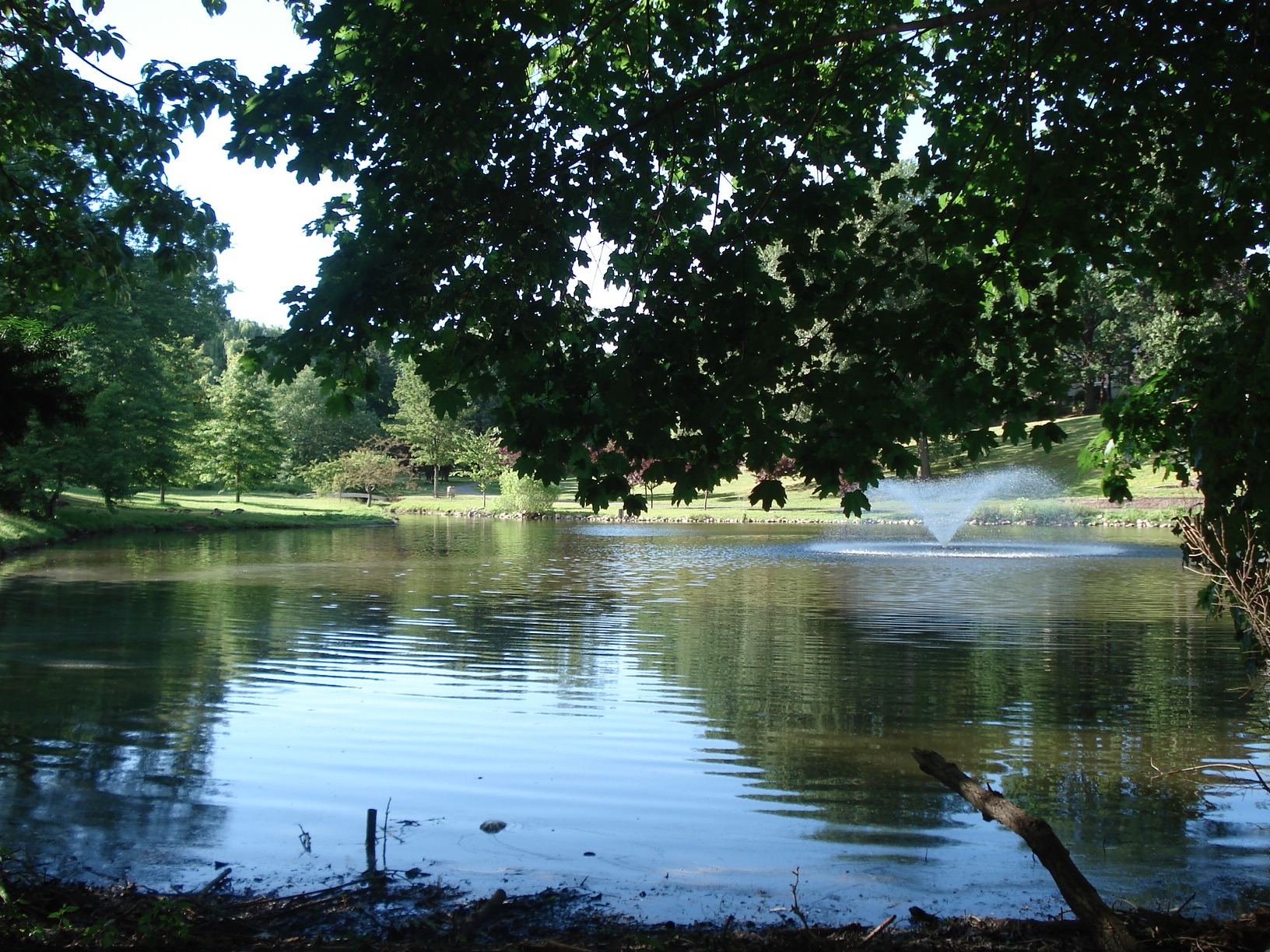
Edge of the pond

=== History ===
1947 United States Geological Survey map of the Orange quadrangle showing the area near present-day Yantacaw Brook Park.

1955 United States Geological Survey map of the Orange quadrangle showing the area near present-day Yantacaw Brook Park.

Prior to its development as a public park, the land that now comprises Yantacaw Brook Park was part of the Upper Montclair Country Club golf course. The club was established in 1912. A 1927 course layout shows that present-day Yantacaw Pond served as the water feature for the club's 109-yard "Lake Hole" (No. 16). Historical accounts identify the location of the former clubhouse site near the present eastern end of Club Road, while the tee for Hole 17 stood near the present intersection of Club Road and Yantacaw Brook Road. Historical accounts describe Hole 17 as a 450-yard par-4 that played eastward toward Broad Street.

A 1927 map of the Upper Montclair Country Club documents the original layout of the golf course and identifies several landscape features that survive within the modern park, including Yantacaw Pond.

United States Geological Survey maps of the Orange quadrangle, depicting the area in 1947 and 1955, document subsequent changes to the former country club property and surrounding neighborhood.

Portions of the former golf course were later developed into nearby streets, including Club Road and The Fairway.

== See also ==
- List of rivers of New Jersey
