= George Hunt House =

Historic house in New Jersey, United States

- U.S. National Register of Historic Places
- New Jersey Register of Historic Places
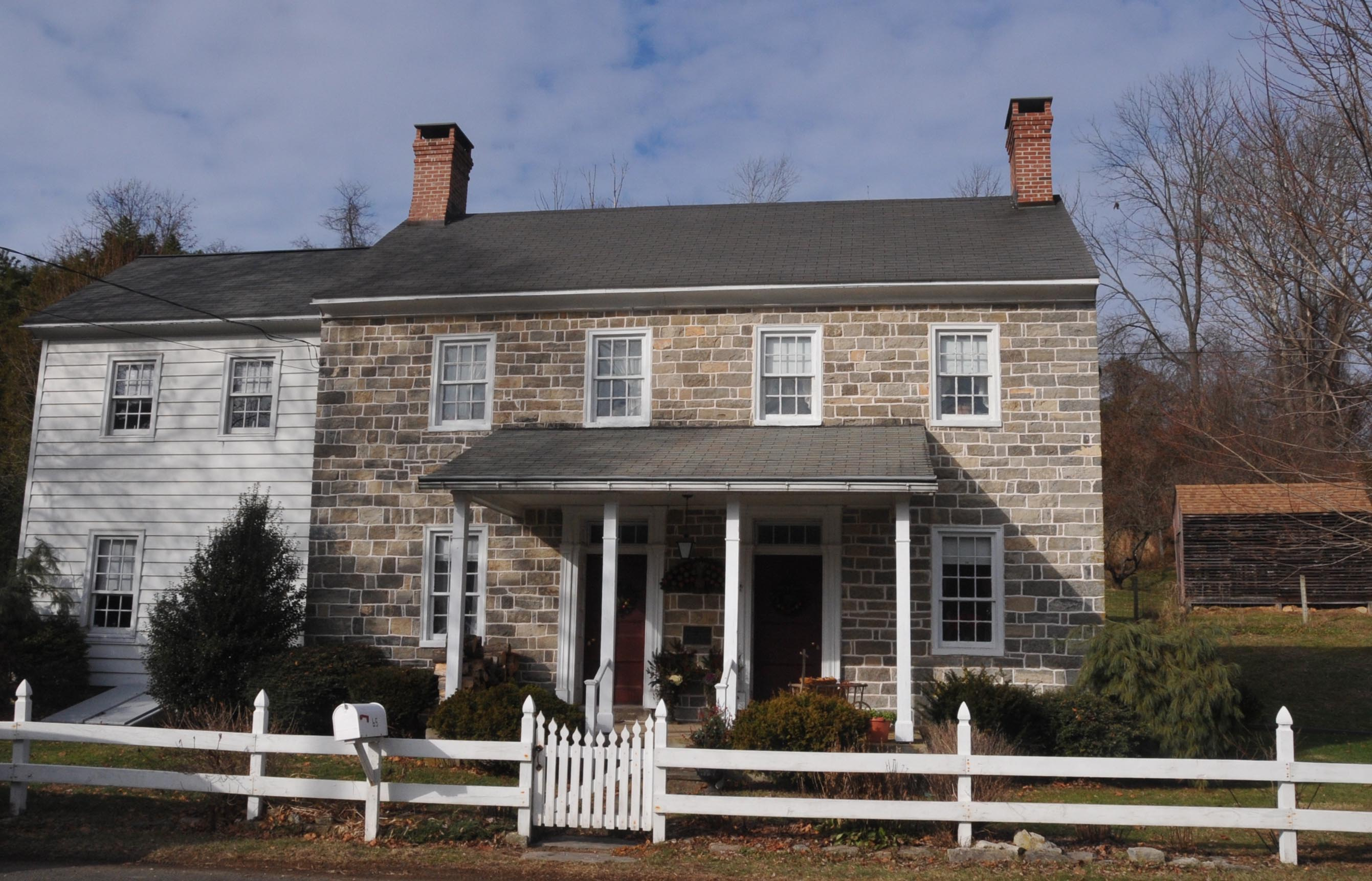

- Location within Warren County, New Jersey Location within New Jersey Location within the United States
- Location: 135 Warren Glen Road, Pohatcong Township, New Jersey
- Nearest city: Alpha, New Jersey
- Coordinates: 40°35′54″N 75°10′57″W
- Area: 2 acres (0.81 ha)
- Built: c. 1825
- Built by: Samuel Loveral
- Architectural style: I-house
- NRHP reference No.: 79001531
- NJRHP No.: 2791

Significant dates
- Added to NRHP: September 12, 1979
- Designated NJRHP: July 5, 1979

The George Hunt House is a historic farmhouse located southwest of the borough of Alpha at 135 Warren Glen Road in Pohatcong Township in Warren County, New Jersey. It was built around 1825 near the confluence of the Musconetcong River with the Delaware River. The house was added to the National Register of Historic Places on September 12, 1979, for its significance in architecture.

== History and description ==
George Hunt (1799–1861) was a farmer, the third generation of the Hunt family to live and farm here. The two and one-half story limestone house was possibly built by Samuel Loveral. It has a typical I-house style. John Hunt (1830–1905) inherited the property and rebuilt the kitchen.

== See also ==
- National Register of Historic Places listings in Warren County, New Jersey
