= Mount Mohepinoke =

Mountain in New Jersey, United States

Highest point
- Elevation: 1,115 ft (340 m) NGVD 29
- Coordinates: 40°50′38″N 74°57′36″W

Geography
- Location: Warren County, New Jersey, U.S.
- Topo map: USGS Washington

Climbing
- Easiest route: Hiking

Mount Mohepinoke is a mountain in Warren County, New Jersey. The summit rises to 1,115 feet (340 m), and is located in Liberty Township, with lower levels extending into White Township. It is part of the New York–New Jersey Highlands of the Appalachian Mountains, although somewhat isolated to the west of the main body of the Highlands.
