= Pompeston Creek =

River in New Jersey, United States

Coordinates: 40°00′57″N 75°00′37″W

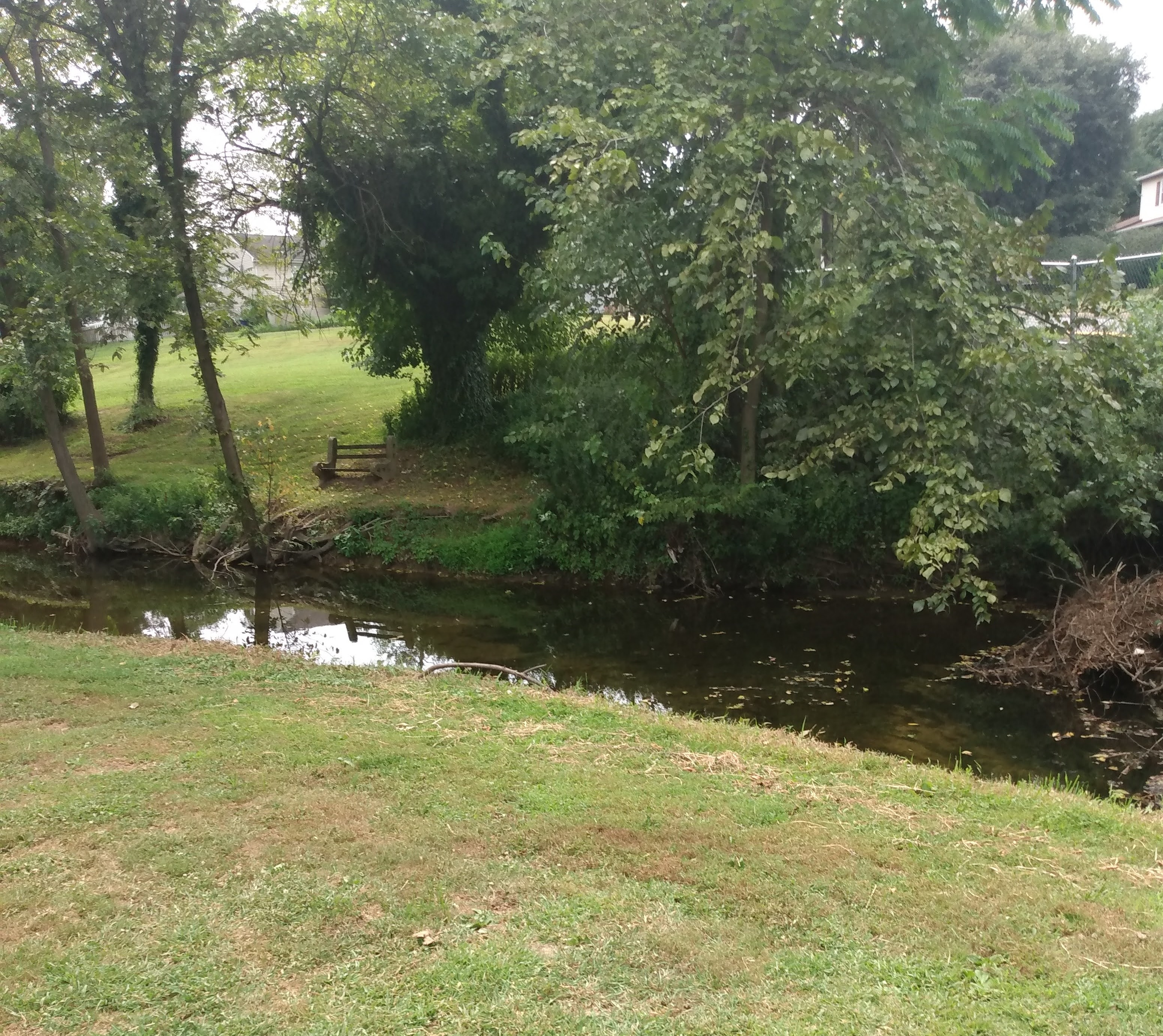
Pompeston Creek

Pompeston Creek is a creek in Burlington County, New Jersey. Pompeston Creek drains an area of 9 square miles, and runs through Riverton, Moorestown, Delran, and Cinnaminson. The river's headwaters are located in Moorestown, and Pompeston Creek flows directly into the Delaware River. Wetlands are common along the banks of the river.

== Water quality ==
80% of the land use within the Pompeston Creek Watershed is urban, and this contributes to the water quality problem in the watershed. The stormwater runoff is often polluted from the urban landscape and from animal wastes and fertilizers, and this runs into the river through the over 200 stormwater outfalls into Pompeston Creek.

Pompeston Creek's water quality improves as you head upstream into Moorestown, and the quality worsens as you near the mouth of the river, passing over more urbanized areas. Water quality has improved in recent years, thanks to efforts from volunteers and informed citizens, as well as stormwater management plans.
