= Mahoras Brook =

Location
- Country: United States

Physical characteristics
- Mouth
  - location: Waackaack Creek
- Length: 3.5 mi (5.6 km)
- Discharge
  - average: 5 cubic feet (0.14 m^{3}) per second

Mahoras Brook is an approximately 3.5 miles (5.6 km) long spring-fed tributary of Waackaack Creek that flows through Monmouth County, New Jersey. It rises in a small glen shortly west of Middletown, at 40°25′12″N 74°08′13″W and makes a bend north, flowing through the northwest section of Tatum Park. The creek flows under Holland Road and runs north in a small, forested swale through a dominantly residential area, roughly paralleling Laurel Avenue (County Route 52), and receives a small tributary on the left bank. Then it flows under New Jersey State Route 35 and soon, its mouth is on the left bank of Waackaack Creek at 40°23′22″N 74°08′13″W.

== See also ==
- List of rivers of New Jersey
- Raritan River
