= Waackaack Rear Range Light =

- Location: Keansburg, New Jersey
- Coordinates: 40°26′39″N 74°8′10″W

Tower
- Construction: Wood (orig.); Iron
- Height: 96 feet (29 m) (first); 106 feet (32 m) (second)
- Shape: square skeleton tower (final)

Light
- First lit: 1856 (1st tower); 1894 (second tower)
- Deactivated: ca. 1955

The Waackaack Rear Range Light was built in 1856 off the shore of Keansburg, in Monmouth county, New Jersey, United States. It stood about 96 feet (29 m) tall. Although it stood near the water's edge, it was the rear range light in conjunction with the Point Comfort Light on the beach. The light's main purpose was to guide vessels coming into the Raritan Bay. It was initially made of wood, but was replaced in the 1860s by an iron tower.

== History ==
In 1883 a high-powered electric lamp was installed that was magnified by a glass lens. Preparations were made to replace the light-tower beginning in 1891. The tower built for use at the Waackaack Rear Range Light Station was part of the United States Lighthouse Board's exhibit at the World's Columbian Exposition held in Chicago in 1893. This lighthouse was built of iron rings, and as the site for the lighthouse was not ready for its erection at the time the light tower was completed, it became possible for the lighthouse to become an exhibit at the Exposition.

When the Borough of Keansburg officially incorporated as a Borough in 1917, it adopted the outline of the Waackaack Range Light as its seal. By the end of the 1950s the lighthouse was dismantled and sold for scrap.
