= Riegelsville Bridge =

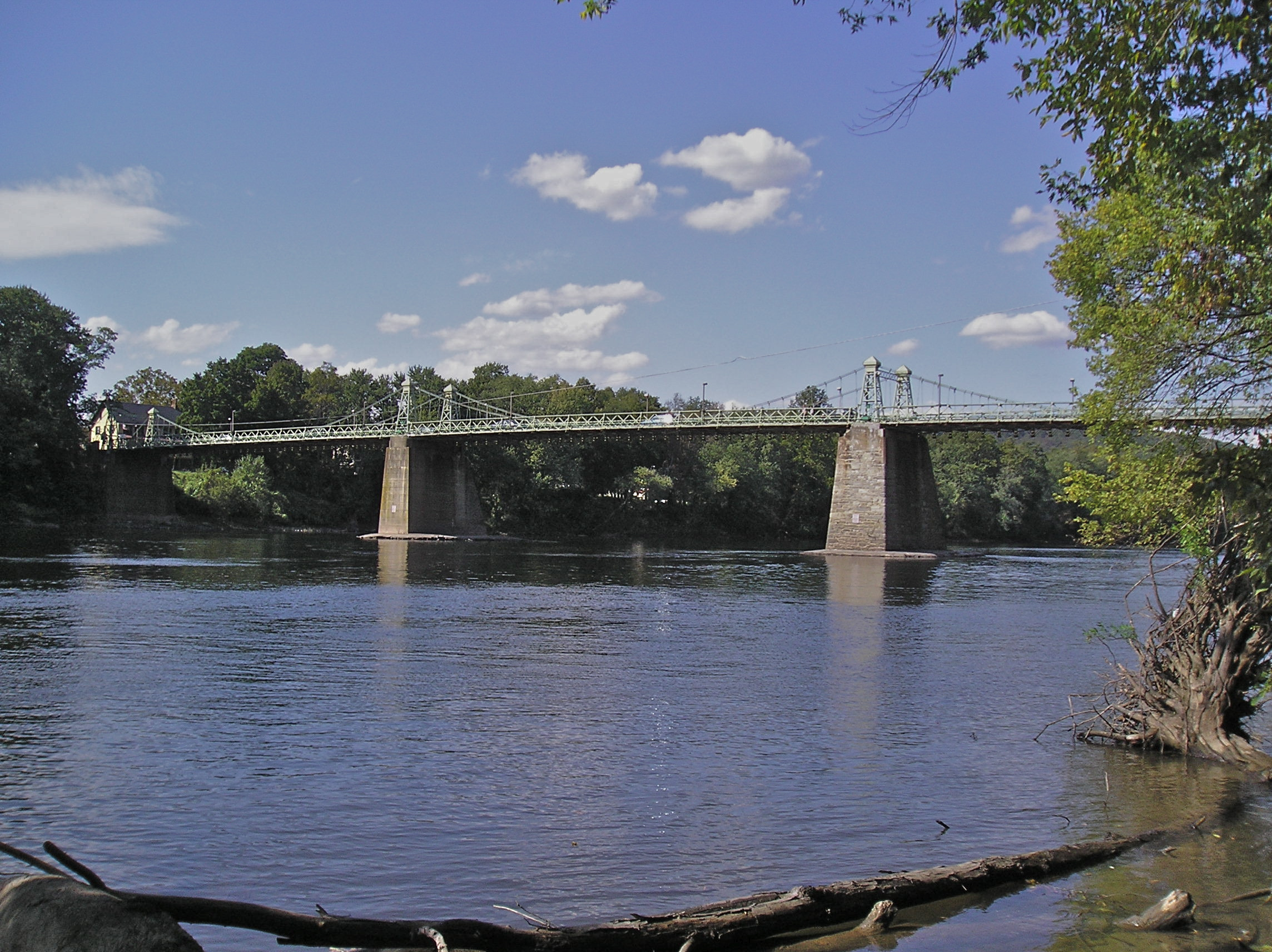
- Coordinates: 40.59422°N 75.19077°W
- Carries: Delaware Road
- Crosses: Delaware River
- Locale: Riegelsville, New Jersey, and Riegelsville, Pennsylvania
- Maintained by: Delaware River Joint Toll Bridge Commission

Characteristics
- Design: Suspension bridge
- Total length: 577 feet (176 m)

History
- Opened: 1904

Statistics
- Toll: None

New Jersey Register of Historic Places
- Designated: March 22, 2010
- Reference no.: 4107

The Riegelsville Bridge is a suspension bridge crossing the Delaware River at Riegelsville, Pennsylvania, connecting it with Riegelsville, New Jersey, United States.

== History ==
Traffic across the Delaware River at Riegelsville, Pennsylvania, was handled by Wendel and Anthony Shenk's oar powered ferries until December 15, 1837, when a three-span, wooden covered bridge was opened to horse, wagon, and pedestrian use. The Pennsylvania and New Jersey legislatures had approved the formation of the private Riegelsville Delaware Bridge Corporation in 1835 and the company engaged Solon Chapin and James Madison Porter of Easton, Pennsylvania as the contractors. A major flood struck the Delaware Valley on January 8, 1841, just three years after the bridge opened, and the span nearest the Jersey shore was destroyed. The bridge was repaired and survived another flood in June 1862.

The "Pumpkin Flood" occurred on October 10, 1903, and the Delaware waters rose to 33.8 feet (10.3 m) above normal. The two spans nearest to New Jersey were quickly swept down the river. The third section collapsed soon after.

The wire rope and engineering firm of John A. Roebling's Sons Co., based in Trenton, New Jersey, were soon commissioned and replaced the covered bridge with a cable suspension bridge. This new bridge incorporated the original piers which were repaired and raised several feet, allowing it to survive major damage from the flood of 1936 and to come through a 1955 deluge relatively unscathed. Together, the three spans are 585 feet (178 m) in length and the final cost of construction was $30,000. It opened on April 18, 1904.

Roebling's original design for the bridge employed main cables 2 5/8 inches (7 cm) in diameter. Professor James Madison Porter III, the grandson of the builder of the earlier Riegelsville bridge, was asked to evaluate the new design and felt the need for additional cables of 1 3/4 inches (4 cm) diameter, which were added to the plans.

The Riegelsville suspension bridge collected tolls until it was purchased by the Joint Commission for Eliminating Tolls and is currently maintained by the Delaware River Joint Toll Bridge Commission using revenues generated from larger, more heavily trafficked crossings. The bridge has a 3-ton weight limit. It was added to the New Jersey Register of Historic Places on March 22, 2010.

== Gallery ==
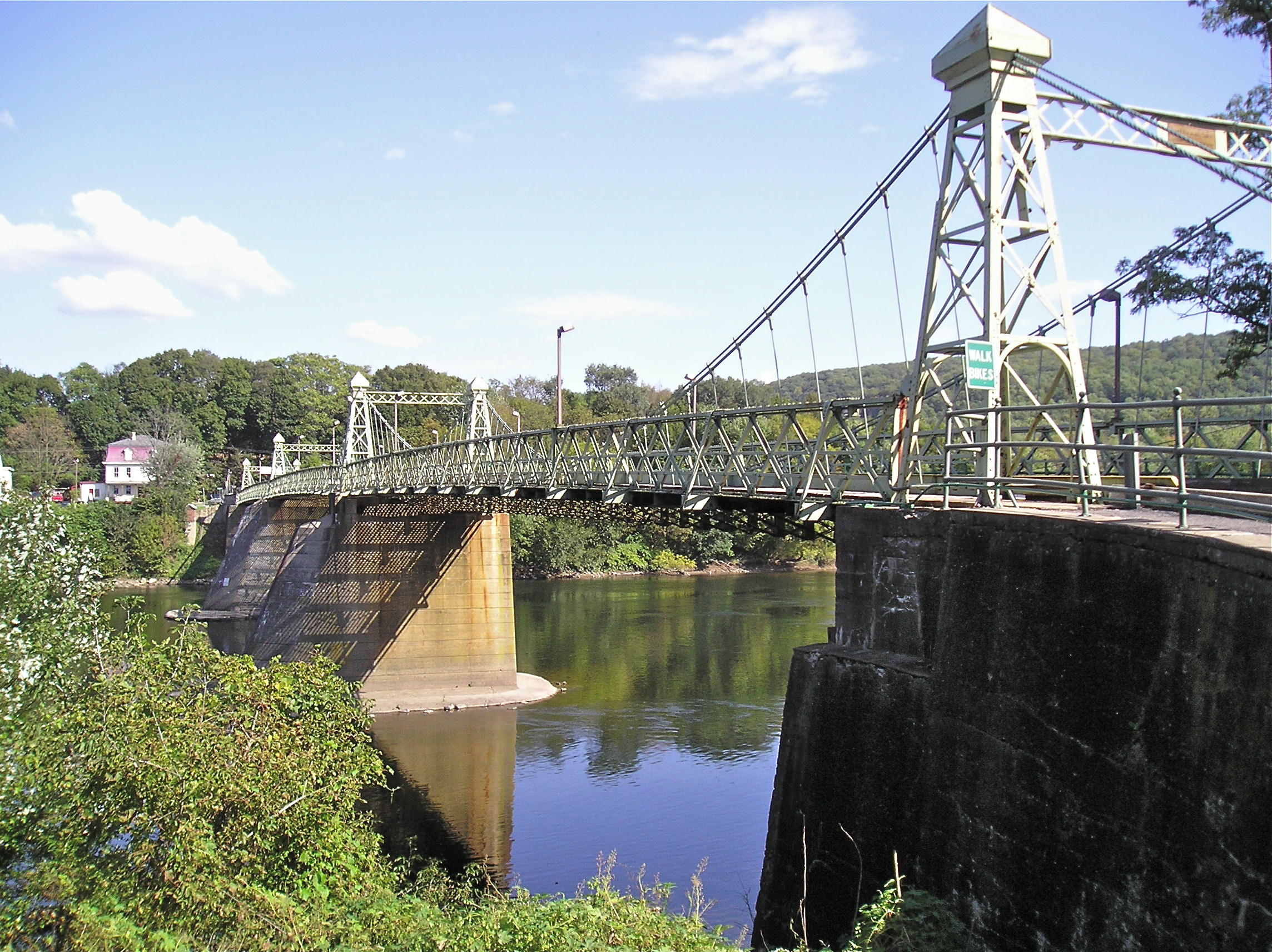
Roebling's 1904 suspension bridge at Riegelsville

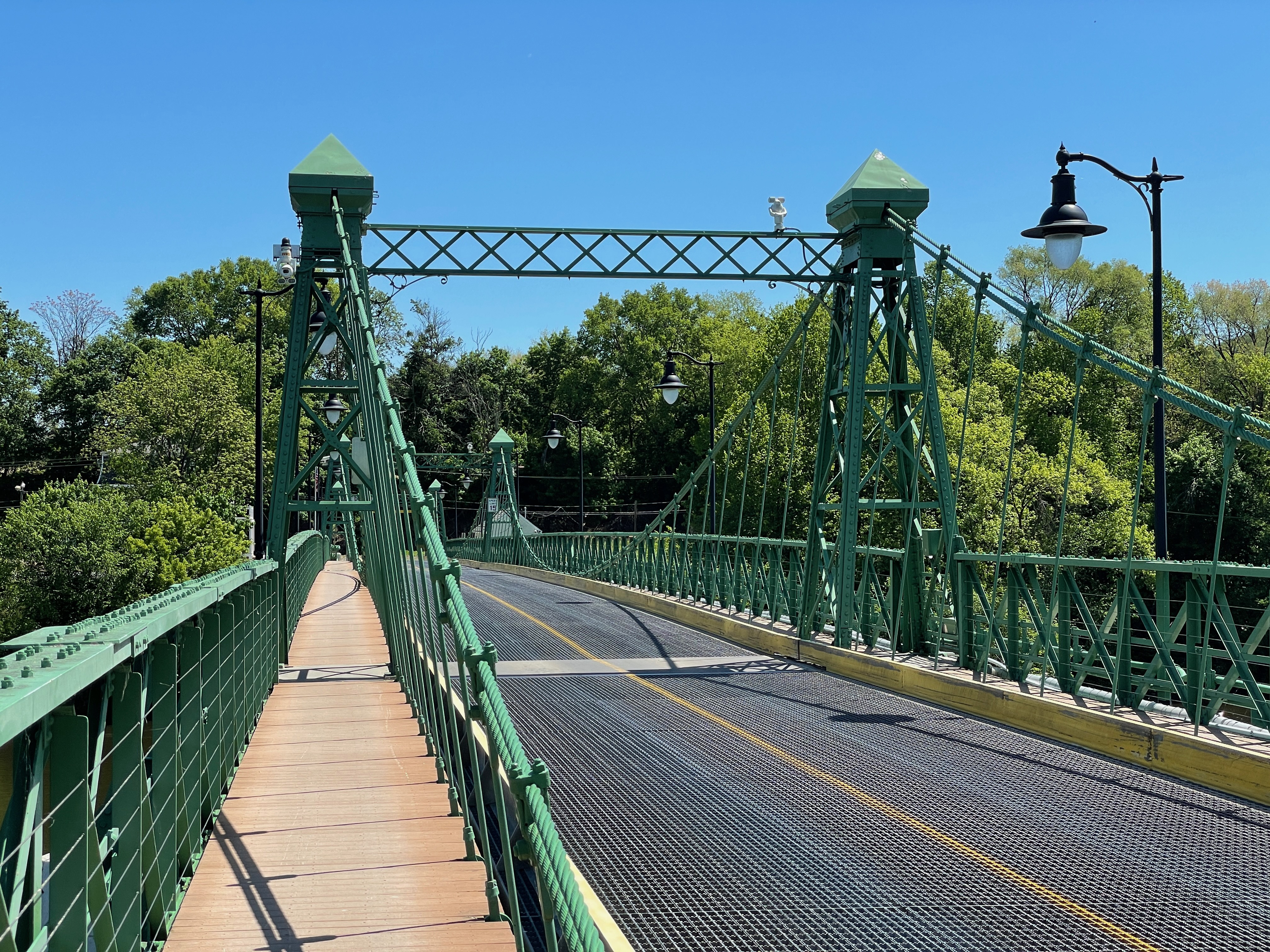
Bridge detail, looking east

== See also ==
- List of bridges documented by the Historic American Engineering Record in New Jersey
- List of bridges documented by the Historic American Engineering Record in Pennsylvania
- List of crossings of the Delaware River
