= Yanticaw Park =

County park in Nutley, New Jersey

- Interactive map of Yanticaw Park
- Type: Public park
- Location: Nutley, New Jersey
- Coordinates: 40.8156°N 74.1559°W
- Area: 28.75 acres (116,300 m^{2})
- Operator: Essex County
- Open: All year

Yanticaw Park is an Essex County-owned park in Nutley, New Jersey along the Third River. It is located between Centre Street and Chestnut Street, extending east to Passaic Avenue.

== History ==
After tremendous pressure from Nutley residents, Essex County began purchasing land in 1911 for creation of the park. Wetlands in the park were drained, and a dam was set up to form a lake. The park was completed in 1914. In 1962, the lake, containing a small island was drained and a channel was dug as a continuation of the natural Third River from the south.

== "Girls' Park" ==
The lower section of the park, east of Park Drive, is commonly known as Girls' Park. This is the part of the park containing the Third River. It also includes the Frank A. Cocchiola Memorial Playground, completed in 2003 and dedicated on April 17, 2006. The park has a rubberized safety surface and equipment manufactured by GameTime. Gym classes from adjacent Nutley High School are commonly seen running through the park. North of the park is a public basketball court.

In 2010, the court, along with the playground bathroom facilities, were completely renovated.

== "Boys' Park" ==
The upper section of the park, between Park Drive and Passaic Avenue, contains the Carmen A. Orechio Recreation Complex.

This complex includes an artificial turf softball field, plus a grass one and a large grass baseball field. All were newly graded in 2010.
