= Pohatcong Township, New Jersey =

Township in Warren County, New Jersey, US

- Township
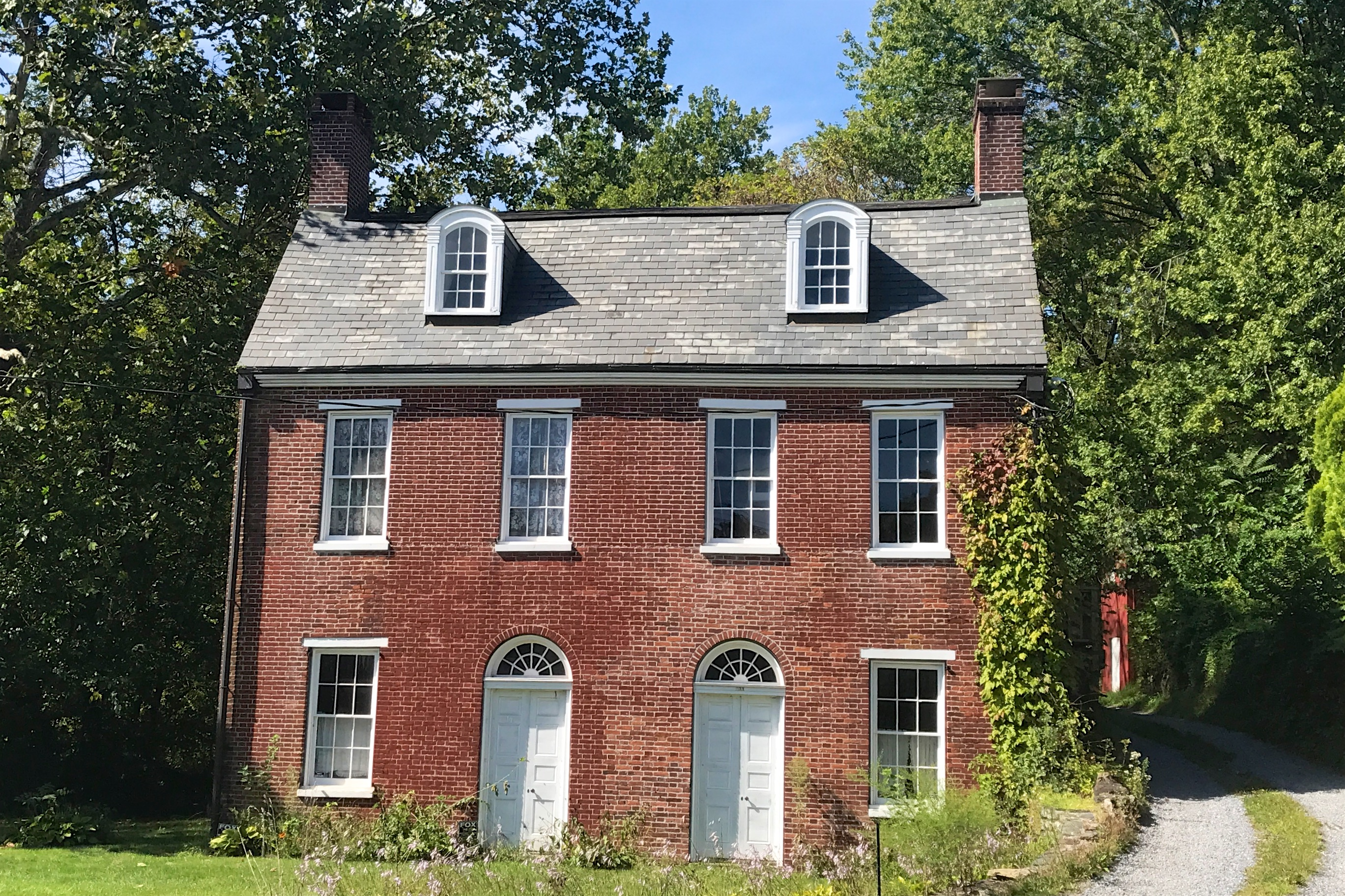
- Springtown Stagecoach Inn, listed on the National Register of Historic Places

- Seal

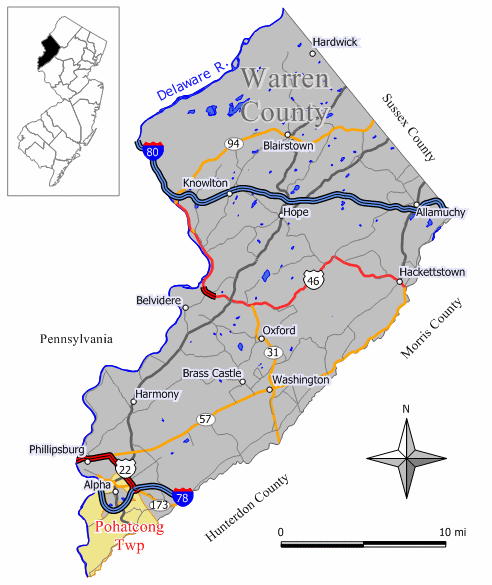
- Location of Pohatcong Township in Warren County highlighted in yellow (right). Inset map: Location of Warren County in New Jersey highlighted in black (left).

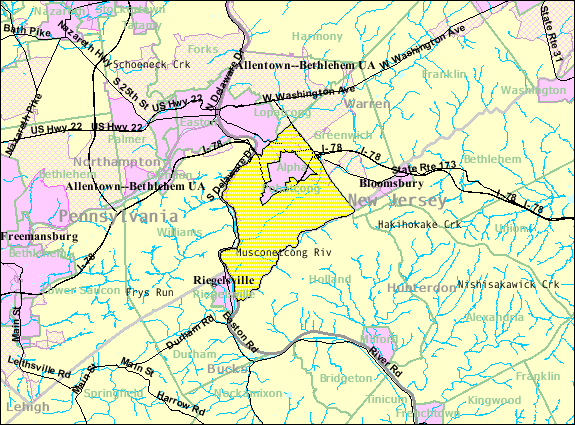
- Census Bureau map of Pohatcong Township, New Jersey

- Location in Warren County Location in New Jersey Location in the United States
- Coordinates: 40.636483°N 75.174906°W
- Country: United States
- State: New Jersey
- County: Warren
- Incorporated: January 1, 1882

Government
  - Type: Faulkner Act
  - Body: Township Council
  - Mayor: David S. Slack (term ends December 31, 2023)
  - Municipal clerk: Wanda L. Kutzman

Area
  - Total: 13.76 sq mi (35.63 km^{2})
  - Land: 13.37 sq mi (34.63 km^{2})
  - Water: 0.39 sq mi (1.00 km^{2}) 2.81%
  - Rank: 179th of 565 in state 13th of 22 in county
- Elevation: 253 ft (77 m)

Population (2020)
  - Total: 3,241
  - Estimate (2023): 3,276
  - Rank: 439th of 565 in state 12th of 22 in county
  - Density: 242.4/sq mi (93.6/km^{2})
  - Rank: 492nd of 565 in state 13th of 22 in county
- Time zone: UTC−05:00 (Eastern (EST))
  - Summer (DST): UTC−04:00 (Eastern (EDT))
- ZIP Code: 08804 – Bloomsbury; 08865 – Phillipsburg
- Area code: 908
- FIPS code: 34-59820
- GNIS feature ID: 882254
- School district: Phillipsburg School District
- Website: www.pohatcongtwp.org

Pohatcong Township is a township in Warren County, in the U.S. state of New Jersey. As of the 2020 United States census, the township's population was 3,241, a decrease of 98 (−2.9%) from the 2010 census count of 3,339, which in turn reflected a decline of 77 (−2.3%) from the 3,416 counted in the 2000 census.

The name Pohatcong is thought to be derived from the Lenni Lenape Native American term meaning "stream between split hills".

== History ==
Pohatcong Township was officially established in 1881. On March 24, 1881, Chapter 145 of the Acts of the New Jersey General Assembly was published defining and creating Pohatcong Township. The act to form Pohatcong had been introduced by Assemblyman William Fritts and, once law, was to take effect January 1 of the following year. Pohatcong was incorporated on January 1, 1882. It was divided off of Greenwich Township. Pohatcong township's name comes from Lenape Native Americans, who called the area "split hills stream outlet". The industrialized center of the township was separated to form Alpha borough, on April 27, 1911.

== Geography ==
According to the U.S. Census Bureau, the township had a total area of 13.76 square miles (35.63 km^{2}), including 13.37 square miles (34.63 km^{2}) of land and 0.39 square miles (1.00 km^{2}) of water (2.81%).

Finesville (with a 2020 Census population of 364) and Upper Pohatcong (1,714) are unincorporated communities and census-designated places (CDPs) located within the township. Other unincorporated communities, localities and place names located partially or completely within the township include Carpentersville, Hughesville, Huntington, Kennedys, Riegelsville, Springtown, Warren and Warren Glen.

Pohatcong Township borders the municipalities of Greenwich Township, Lopatcong Township and Phillipsburg in Warren County; and Bethlehem Township, Bloomsbury and Holland Township in Hunterdon County. The borough of Alpha is completely surrounded by Pohatcong Township, making it part of 21 pairs of "doughnut towns" in the state, where one municipality entirely surrounds another.

== Demographics ==
Historical population
Census	Pop.	Note	%±
1890	1,483		—
1900	2,215		49.4%
1910	3,202		44.6%
1920	1,559	*	−51.3%
1930	1,974		26.6%
1940	2,029		2.8%
1950	2,540		25.2%
1960	3,543		39.5%
1970	3,924		10.8%
1980	3,856		−1.7%
1990	3,591		−6.9%
2000	3,416		−4.9%
2010	3,339		−2.3%
2020	3,241		−2.9%
2023 (est.)	3,276		1.1%
Population sources: 1890–1920; 1890 1890–1910 1910–1930; 1940–2000 2000; 2010 2020 * = Lost territory in previous decade

The township's economic data (as is all of Warren County) is calculated by the US Census Bureau as part of the Lehigh Valley / Allentown-Bethlehem-Easton, PA-NJ Metropolitan Statistical Area.

=== 2010 census ===
The 2010 United States census counted 3,339 people, 1,310 households, and 942 families in the township. The population density was 250.0 per square mile (96.5/km^{2}). There were 1,420 housing units at an average density of 106.3 per square mile (41.0/km^{2}). The racial makeup was 95.24% (3,180) White, 1.59% (53) Black or African American, 0.03% (1) Native American, 0.90% (30) Asian, 0.00% (0) Pacific Islander, 0.69% (23) from other races, and 1.56% (52) from two or more races. Hispanic or Latino of any race were 3.47% (116) of the population.

Of the 1,310 households, 29.8% had children under the age of 18; 58.8% were married couples living together; 8.6% had a female householder with no husband present and 28.1% were non-families. Of all households, 23.4% were made up of individuals and 10.8% had someone living alone who was 65 years of age or older. The average household size was 2.55 and the average family size was 3.01.

22.6% of the population were under the age of 18, 6.6% from 18 to 24, 24.3% from 25 to 44, 31.6% from 45 to 64, and 14.9% who were 65 years of age or older. The median age was 42.8 years. For every 100 females, the population had 100.2 males. For every 100 females ages 18 and older there were 97.3 males. The Census Bureau's 2006–2010 American Community Survey showed that (in 2010 inflation-adjusted dollars) median household income was $84,318 (with a margin of error of +/− $14,047) and the median family income was $95,982 (+/− $2,028). Males had a median income of $56,705 (+/− $13,134) versus $35,481 (+/− $1,974) for females. The per capita income for the borough was $34,781 (+/− $7,346). About 3.9% of families and 4.9% of the population were below the poverty line, including 2.2% of those under age 18 and 3.9% of those age 65 or over.

=== 2000 census ===
As of the 2000 United States census, there were 3,416 people, 1,341 households, and 989 families residing in the township. The population density was 256.3 inhabitants per square mile (99.0/km^{2}). There were 1,411 housing units at an average density of 105.9 per square mile (40.9/km^{2}). The racial makeup of the township was 98.01% White, 0.44% African American, 0.03% Native American, 0.29% Asian, 0.64% from other races, and 0.59% from two or more races. Hispanic or Latino of any race were 2.02% of the population.

There were 1,341 households, out of which 30.2% had children under the age of 18 living with them, 62.6% were married couples living together, 8.6% had a female householder with no husband present, and 26.2% were non-families. 22.0% of all households were made up of individuals, and 10.5% had someone living alone who was 65 years of age or older. The average household size was 2.54 and the average family size was 2.99.

In the township, the population was spread out, with 23.3% under the age of 18, 5.6% from 18 to 24, 30.5% from 25 to 44, 24.6% from 45 to 64, and 16.0% who were 65 years of age or older. The median age was 40 years. For every 100 females, there were 98.3 males. For every 100 females age 18 and over, there were 93.1 males.

The median income for a household in the township was $52,188, and the median income for a family was $60,208. Males had a median income of $44,327 versus $32,316 for females. The per capita income for the township was $24,754. About 3.4% of families and 4.3% of the population were below the poverty line, including 5.5% of those under age 18 and 6.2% of those age 65 or over.

== Economy ==
The Phillipsburg Mall is located on the border of Pohatcong and Lopatcong Township. 43 acres (17 ha) of the mall is located in Pohatcong, with the portion of the property in the township being assessed for $39.8 million, one of the highest valuations in the municipality.

== Government ==
=== Local government ===
Pohatcong Township is governed by the Faulkner Act (small municipality) form of government. The Faulkner Act, formally known as the Optional Municipal Charter Law, allows municipalities to adopt a Small Municipality form of government only for municipalities with a population of under 12,000 at the time of adoption. The township is one of 18 municipalities (of the 564) statewide that use this form of government. The government is comprised of the Mayor and the four-member Township Council, with all positions elected at-large on a non-partisan basis. The Mayor is elected directly by the voters to a four-year term of office. Council members serve a term of three years, which are staggered so that either one or two seats come up for election each year as part of the November general election. In May 2011, the township council submitted an ordinance to shift the non-partisan elections from May to November. The shift, which took effect in November 2012, was intended to save the municipality $8,000 a year in costs associated with conducting the election.

As of 2022, the Mayor of Pohatcong Township is David S. Slack, whose term of office expires on December 31, 2023. Members of the Township Council are Stephen Babinsky (2024), Ingrid Gray (2023), Kevin J. Melvin (2022) and John S. Stillo (2022).

In September 2019, Ingrid Gray was appointed to fill the seat expiring in December 2020 that had been held by Anthony S. Vangeli until he left office.

At 22 years of age when he was inaugurated on July 1, 2011, James R. Kern III became the youngest municipal executive serving in office in the State of New Jersey.

=== Federal, state, and county representation ===
Pohatcong Township is located in the 7th Congressional District and is part of New Jersey's 23rd state legislative district.

For the 119th United States Congress, New Jersey's 7th congressional district is represented by Thomas Kean Jr. (R, Westfield). New Jersey is represented in the United States Senate by Democrats Cory Booker (Newark, term ends 2027) and Andy Kim (Moorestown, term ends 2031).

For the 2026–2027 session, the 23rd legislative district of the New Jersey Legislature is represented in the State Senate by Doug Steinhardt (R, Lopatcong Township) and in the General Assembly by John DiMaio (R, Hackettstown) and Erik Peterson (R, Franklin Township).

Warren County is governed by a three-member Board of County Commissioners, who are chosen at-large on a staggered basis in partisan elections with one seat coming up for election each year as part of the November general election. At an annual reorganization meeting held in the beginning of January, the board selects one of its members to serve as Commissioner Director and other as Deputy Director. As of 2025, Warren County's Commissioners are:

Deputy Director Jason J. Sarnoski (R, Lopatcong Township; 2025), Lori Ciesla (R, Lopatcong Township; 2026), and Director James R. Kern III (R, Pohatcong Township; 2027).

Constitutional officers of Warren County are: Clerk Holly Mackey (R, Alpha; 2027), Sheriff James McDonald Sr. (R, Phillipsburg; 2025) and Surrogate Michael J. Doherty (R, Washington; 2025).

=== Politics ===
As of March 2011, there were a total of 2,162 registered voters in Pohatcong Township, of which 583 (27.0% vs. 21.5% countywide) were registered as Democrats, 595 (27.5% vs. 35.3%) were registered as Republicans and 983 (45.5% vs. 43.1%) were registered as Unaffiliated. There was one voter registered to another party. Among the township's 2010 Census population, 64.7% (vs. 62.3% in Warren County) were registered to vote, including 83.7% of those ages 18 and over (vs. 81.5% countywide).

Gubernatorial election results for Pohatcong Township
Year	Republican		Democratic		Third party(ies)	
Year	No.	%	No.	%	No.	%
2025	817	59.07%	555	40.13%	11	0.80%
2021	783	66.36%	379	32.12%	18	1.53%
2017	520	60.32%	316	36.66%	26	3.02%
2013	688	69.71%	275	27.86%	24	2.43%
2009	619	59.12%	297	28.37%	131	12.51%
2005	488	49.34%	443	44.79%	58	5.86%

In the 2012 presidential election, Republican Mitt Romney received 802 votes (54.1% vs. 56.0% countywide), ahead of Democrat Barack Obama with 634 votes (42.8% vs. 40.8%) and other candidates with 22 votes (1.5% vs. 1.7%), among the 1,482 ballots cast by the township's 2,158 registered voters, for a turnout of 68.7% (vs. 66.7% in Warren County). In the 2008 presidential election, Republican John McCain received 813 votes (51.5% vs. 55.2% countywide), ahead of Democrat Barack Obama with 707 votes (44.8% vs. 41.4%) and other candidates with 24 votes (1.5% vs. 1.6%), among the 1,578 ballots cast by the township's 2,178 registered voters, for a turnout of 72.5% (vs. 73.4% in Warren County). In the 2004 presidential election, Republican George W. Bush received 863 votes (53.8% vs. 61.0% countywide), ahead of Democrat John Kerry with 712 votes (44.4% vs. 37.2%) and other candidates with 23 votes (1.4% vs. 1.3%), among the 1,605 ballots cast by the township's 2,141 registered voters, for a turnout of 75.0% (vs. 76.3% in the whole county).

United States presidential election results for Pohatcong Township
Year	Republican		Democratic		Third party(ies)	
Year	No.	%	No.	%	No.	%
2024	1,180	62.83%	656	34.93%	42	2.24%
2020	1,172	61.14%	707	36.88%	38	1.98%
2016	978	62.57%	515	32.95%	70	4.48%
2012	802	55.01%	634	43.48%	22	1.51%
2008	813	52.66%	707	45.79%	24	1.55%
2004	863	54.01%	712	44.56%	23	1.44%

In the 2013 gubernatorial election, Republican Chris Christie received 69.7% of the vote (688 cast), ahead of Democrat Barbara Buono with 27.9% (275 votes), and other candidates with 2.4% (24 votes), among the 1,001 ballots cast by the township's 2,180 registered voters (14 ballots were spoiled), for a turnout of 45.9%. In the 2009 gubernatorial election, Republican Chris Christie received 619 votes (57.9% vs. 61.3% countywide), ahead of Democrat Jon Corzine with 297 votes (27.8% vs. 25.7%), Independent Chris Daggett with 117 votes (10.9% vs. 9.8%) and other candidates with 14 votes (1.3% vs. 1.5%), among the 1,069 ballots cast by the township's 2,115 registered voters, yielding a 50.5% turnout (vs. 49.6% in the county).

United States Senate election results for Pohatcong Township1
Year	Republican		Democratic		Third party(ies)	
Year	No.	%	No.	%	No.	%
2024	1,102	60.28%	677	37.04%	49	2.68%
2018	763	61.43%	411	33.09%	68	5.48%
2012	691	51.00%	645	47.60%	19	1.40%
2006	707	53.28%	552	41.60%	68	5.12%

United States Senate election results for Pohatcong Township2
Year	Republican		Democratic		Third party(ies)	
Year	No.	%	No.	%	No.	%
2020	1,136	60.17%	703	37.24%	49	2.60%
2014	413	57.84%	267	37.39%	34	4.76%
2013	335	65.56%	169	33.07%	7	1.37%
2008	850	57.86%	586	39.89%	33	2.25%

== Education ==
The Pohatcong Township School District serves students in pre-kindergarten through eighth grade at Pohatcong Township Elementary School. As of the 2018–19 school year, the district, comprised of one school, had an enrollment of 304 students and 30.3 classroom teachers (on an FTE basis), for a student–teacher ratio of 10.0:1.

Public school students in ninth through twelfth grades attend Phillipsburg High School in Phillipsburg, which serves students from the Town of Phillipsburg as part of a sending/receiving relationship with the Phillipsburg School District. The high school also serves students from four other sending communities: Alpha, Bloomsbury (in Hunterdon County), Greenwich Township and Lopatcong Township. As of the 2018–19 school year, the high school had an enrollment of 1,650 students and 126.5 classroom teachers (on an FTE basis), for a student–teacher ratio of 13.0:1.

Students from the township and from all of Warren County are eligible to attend Ridge and Valley Charter School in Frelinghuysen Township (for grades K–8) or Warren County Technical School in Washington borough (for 9–12), with special education services provided by local districts supplemented throughout the county by the Warren County Special Services School District in Oxford Township (for PreK–12).

== Transportation ==
=== Roads and highways ===
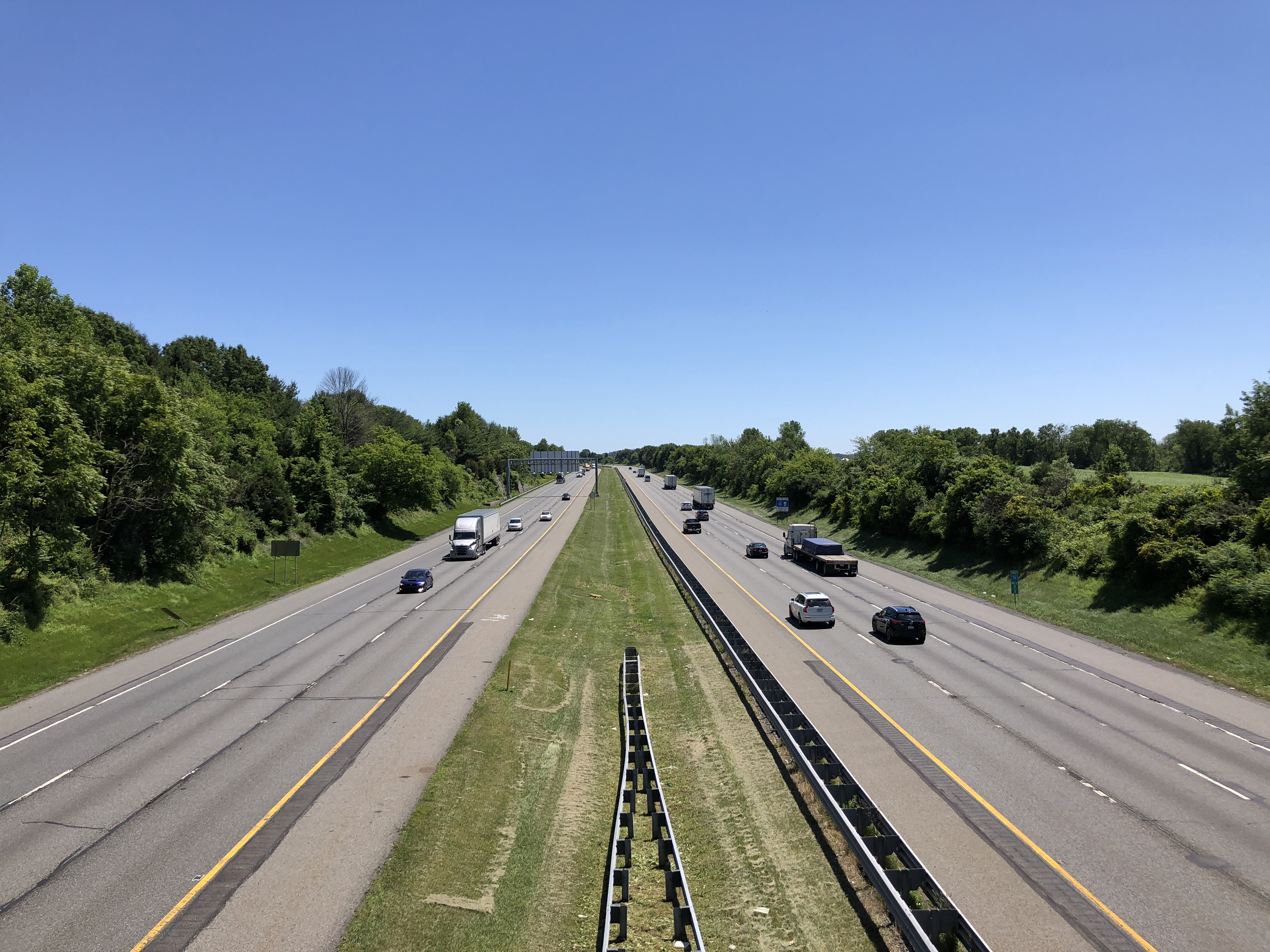
Interstate 78 eastbound in Pohatcong Township

As of May 2010, the township had a total of 54.70 miles (88.03 km) of roadways, of which 36.13 miles (58.15 km) were maintained by the municipality, 12.81 miles (20.62 km) by Warren County, 3.20 miles (5.15 km) by the New Jersey Department of Transportation and 2.56 miles (4.12 km) by the Delaware River Joint Toll Bridge Commission.

Interstate 78 is the most significant highway in Pohatcong. It passes through in the central region of the township. U.S. Route 22 runs along the eastern border before running concurrent with I-78. Route 122 passes through the northern portions of the township. The most significant county road in the township is CR 519.

The Riegelsville Bridge is a suspension bridge crossing the Delaware River connecting Pohatcong to Riegelsville, Pennsylvania, that is owned and operated by the Delaware River Joint Toll Bridge Commission. The current bridge on the site opened in 1904.

=== Public transportation ===
Trans-Bridge Lines operates the New Jersey Transit 890 and 891 bus routes, which connect Pohatcong Township with Easton, Pennsylvania.

=== Rail- the Lehigh Line ===
The Norfolk Southern Railway's Lehigh Line (formerly the mainline of the Lehigh Valley Railroad), runs through Pohatcong Township on its way to Phillipsburg, New Jersey.

== Points of interest ==
The George Hunt House was added to the National Register of Historic Places in 1979 for its significance in architecture.

The Hixson–Skinner Mill Complex, also known as Cole's Grist Mill Complex, near Springtown, was added to the NRHP in 1982 for its significance in commerce and industry.

The Finesville–Seigletown Historic District was added to the NRHP in 2010 for its significance in architecture, engineering, and industry.

The Hixson–Mixsell House, also known as the Springtown Stagecoach Inn, was added to the NRHP in 2014 for its significance in architecture.

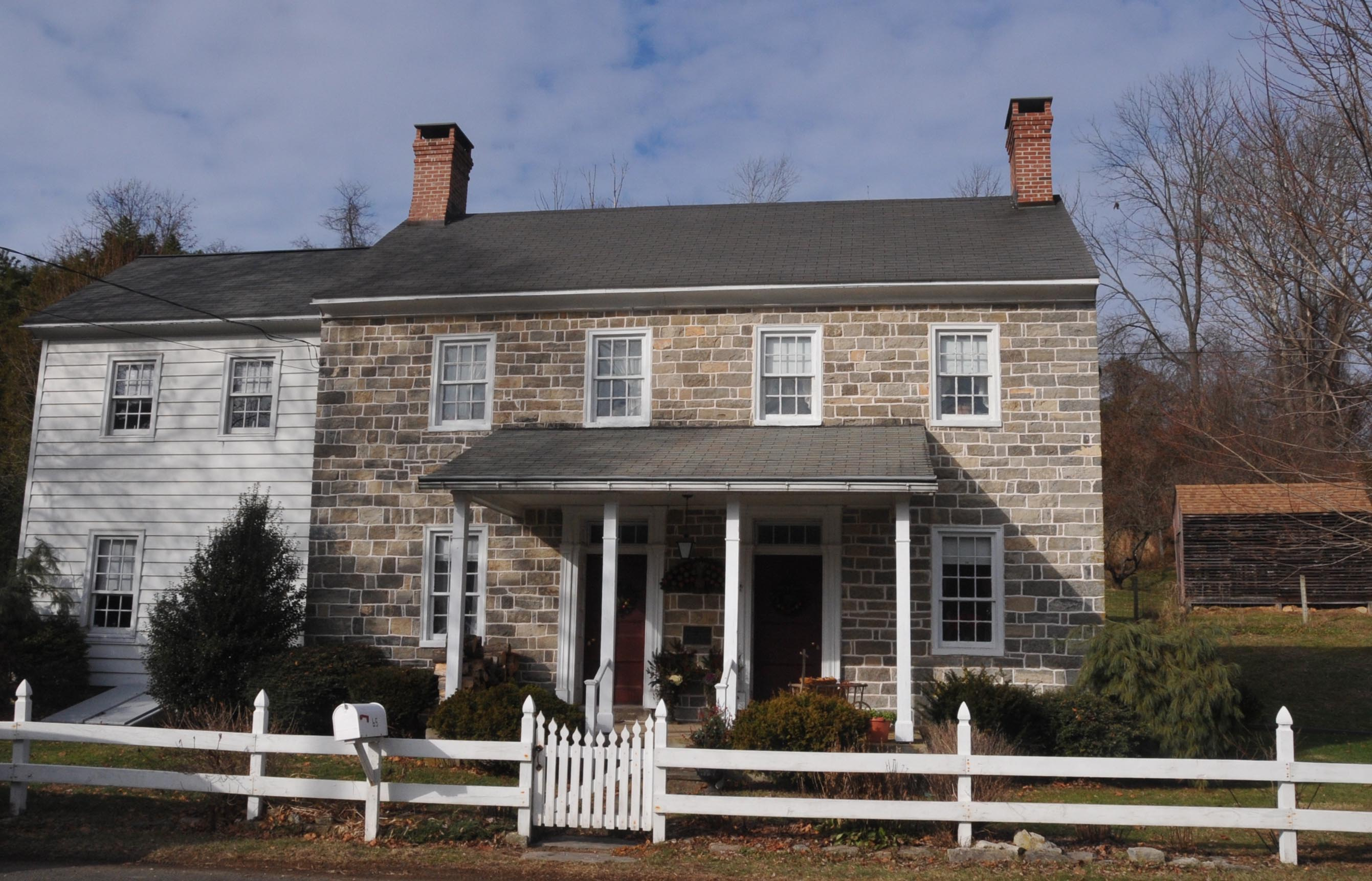
George Hunt House

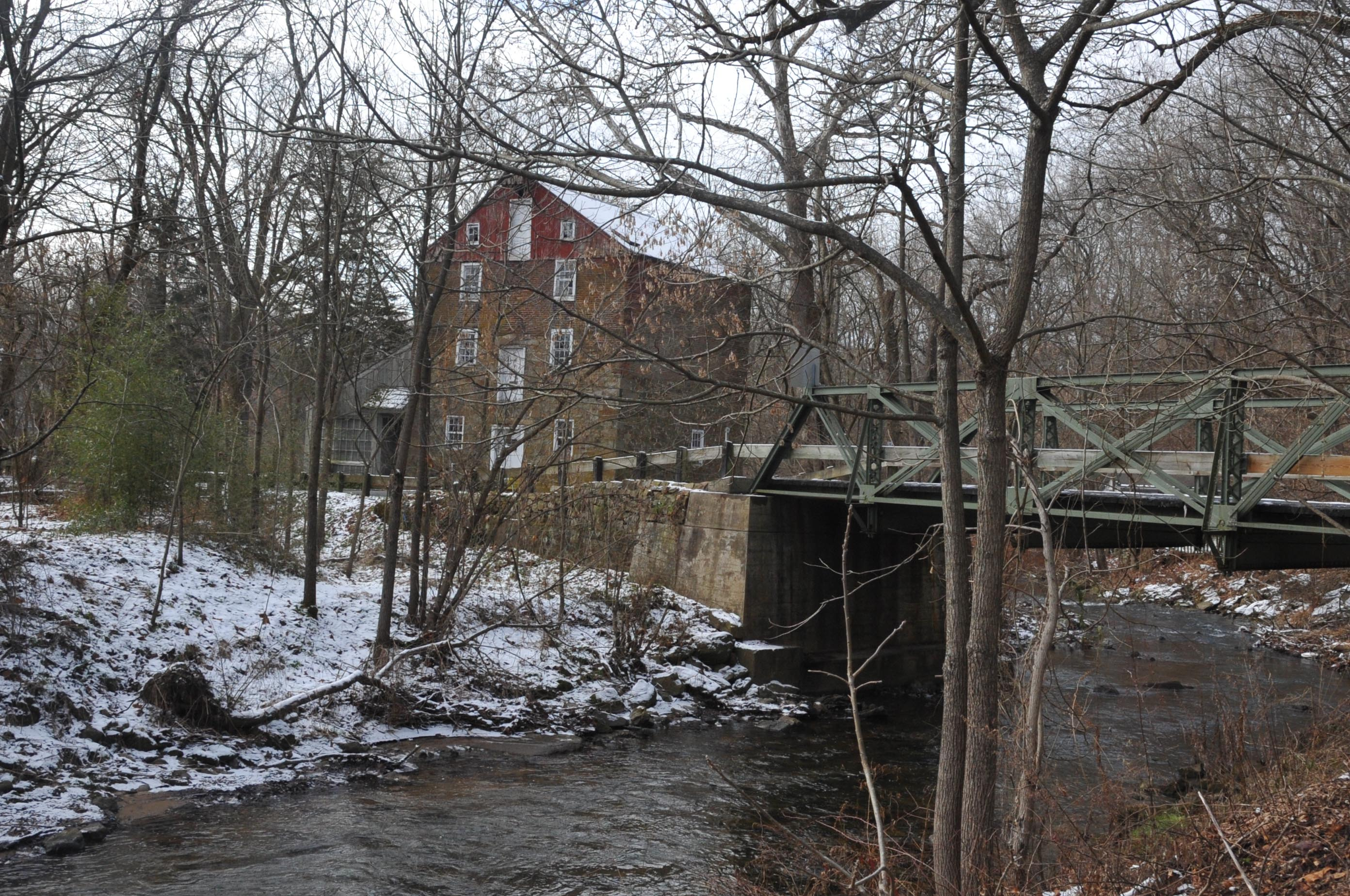
Hixson–Skinner Mill Complex

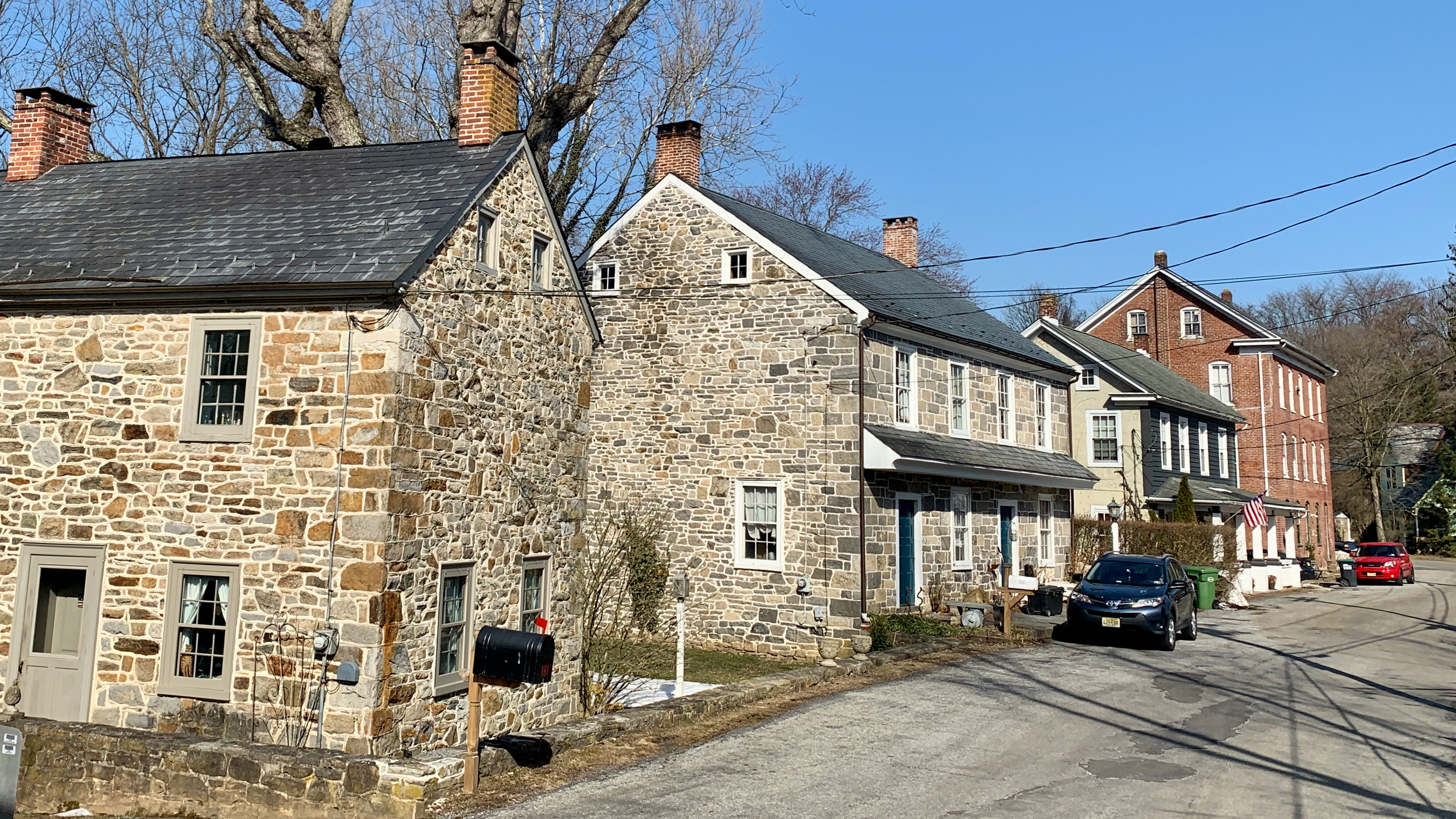
Finesville–Seigletown Historic District

== Wineries ==
- Alba Vineyard
- Villa Milagro Vineyards
