= Pohatcong Mountain =

Mountain in New Jersey, United States

- Location within Warren County, New Jersey

Highest point
- Elevation: 866 ft (264 m)
- Listing: List of mountains of the United States
- Coordinates: 40°43′49″N 75°01′03″W

Geography
- Location: Warren County, New Jersey, United States
- Parent range: Appalachian Mountains
- Topo map: USGS Bloomsbury

Pohatcong Mountain is a ridge, approximately 6 mi (10 km) long, in the Appalachian Mountains of northwestern New Jersey in the United States. It extends from west Phillipsburg northeast approximately to Allamuchy Township, New Jersey.

The ridge continues on north past Washington as Upper Pohatcong Mountain. It is located in eastern Warren County, and extends northeast of Washington approximately 6 mi (10 km) to the vicinity of Hackettstown. The ridge has an average height of approximately 800 ft (240 m) and reaches a maximum summit of 1235 ft (374 m).

The term "Pohatcong Mountain" is sometimes taken to include both Pohatcong and Upper Pohatcong Mountain. The ridge is approximately 800 ft (244 m) high along much of its length. The mountain divides the watersheds of Pohatcong Creek on its northwestern flank and the Musconetcong River on its southeastern flank.
