= Pohatcong Creek =

River in New Jersey, United States

Coordinates: 40°44′11″N 75°01′41″W

Pohatcong Creek (also called the Pohatcong River) is a 30.7-mile-long (49.4 km) tributary of the Delaware River in northwestern New Jersey in the United States.

It rises in the mountains of eastern Warren County, west of Hackettstown. It flows southwest, in a valley along the northwestern side of the Pohatcong Mountain ridge, which separates its watershed from that of the Musconetcong River. It joins the Delaware in Pohatcong Township, approximately 5 miles (8 kilometers) south of Phillipsburg.

The name Pohatcong is said to have thought of a Munsee phrase — pohwihtukwung, or "at the rippling or lapping river".

== See also ==
- List of New Jersey rivers
