= Third River (New Jersey) =

River in New Jersey, United States

Coordinates: 40.800625°N 74.187229°W

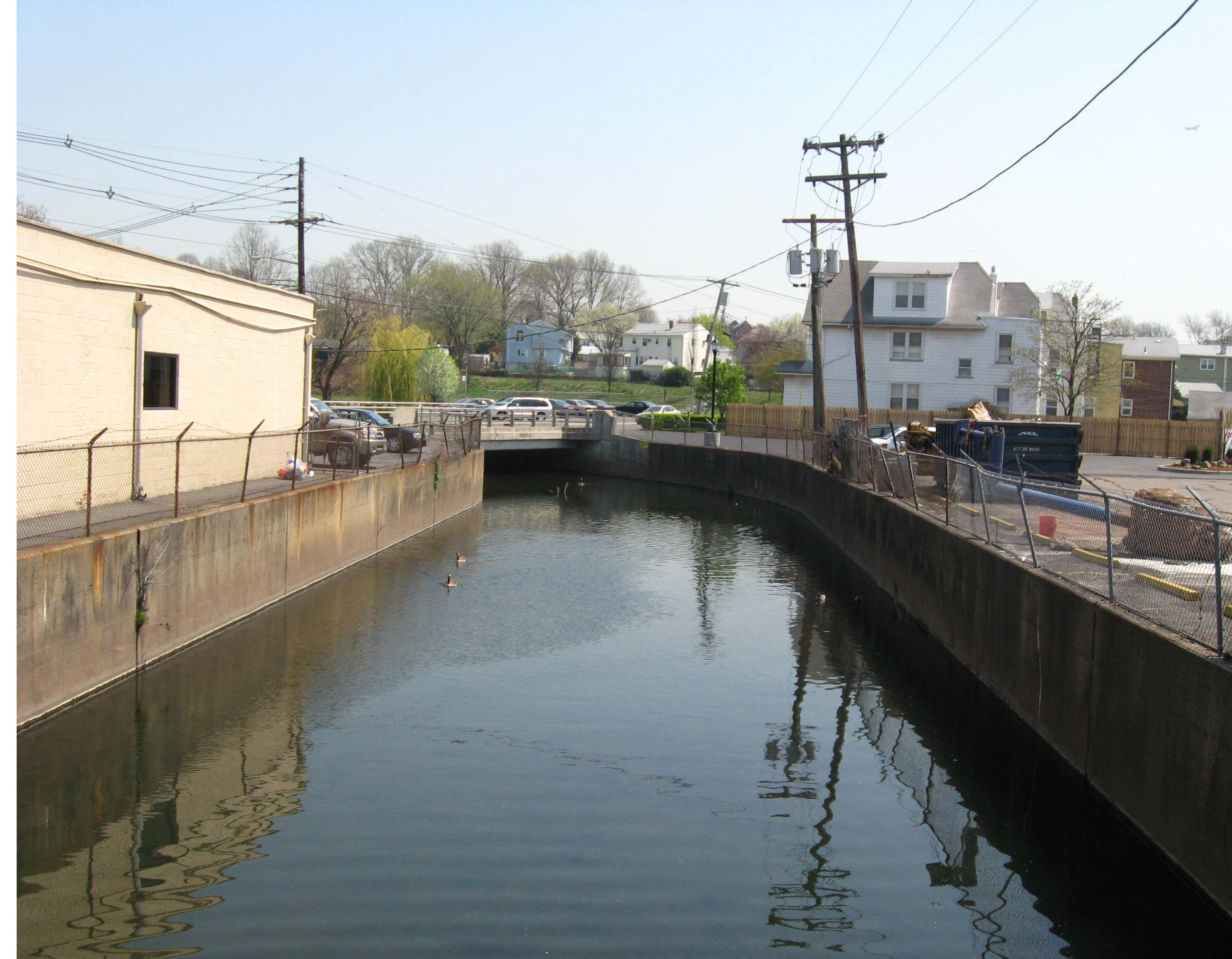
Third River as seen from Franklin Avenue Bridge, Nutley

The Third River, also known as the Yantecaw River (possibly from Munsee yu wandakw, "here this way"), is the third (upstream) main tributary of the Passaic River in Passaic and Essex Counties, New Jersey in the United States.

The river originates in the Great Notch Reservoir in Woodland Park, New Jersey, before running through the towns of Little Falls, Clifton and Montclair. It then goes into Clifton a second time, through Bloomfield, the grounds of the Upper Montclair Country Club, and the Glen Ridge Country Club. After this, it runs by Bloomfield's North Middle School, where it forms Clarks Pond, which is used by the school's science classes to help teach biology. It then passes through Bloomfield's Brookside Park which was the location of a mill in the Colonial Period. It also passes next to Foley Field, which is used by the Bloomfield High School football team, and the town's little league baseball teams. The river then runs through multiple parks in the town of Nutley in Essex County. It enters the Passaic River in Clifton just north of the border with Nutley.

== See also ==
- List of rivers of New Jersey
