= Musconetcong River =

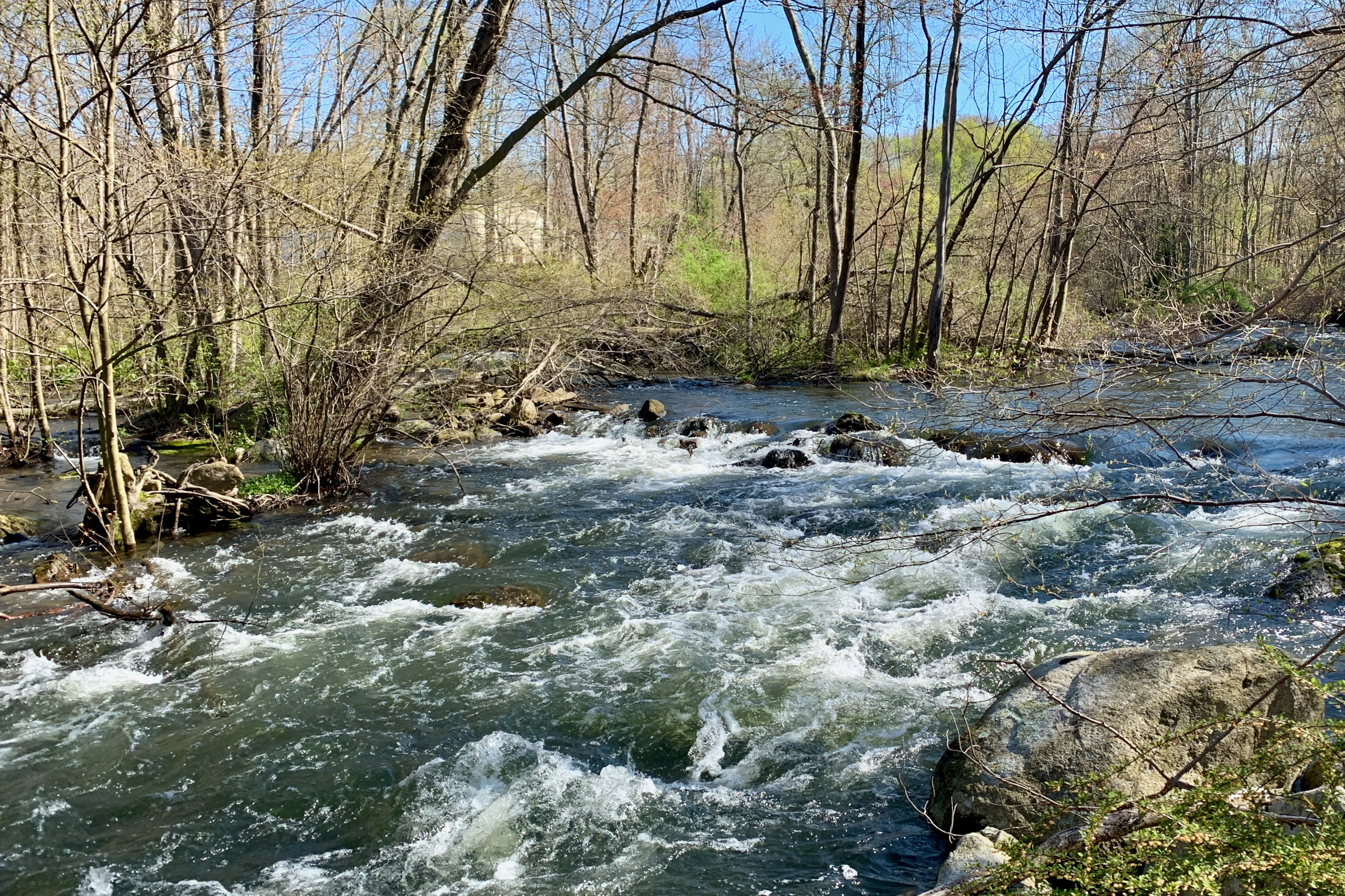
- Musconetcong River in Hopatcong State Park

Location
- Country: United States
- State: New Jersey

Physical characteristics
- Source: Lake Hopatcong
  - location: Border between Hopatcong and Roxbury
  - coordinates: 40°55′01″N 74°39′57″W
- Mouth: Delaware River
  - location: Riegelsville
  - coordinates: 40°35′52″N 75°11′19″W

National Wild and Scenic River
- Type: Scenic, Recreational
- Designated: December 22, 2006

The Musconetcong River is a 45.7-mile-long (73.5 km) tributary of the Delaware River in northwestern New Jersey in the United States. It flows through the rural mountainous country of northwestern New Jersey. The name derives from the Lenape words moschakgeu meaning "clear" and hannek meaning "stream". Part of it is a National Wild and Scenic River.

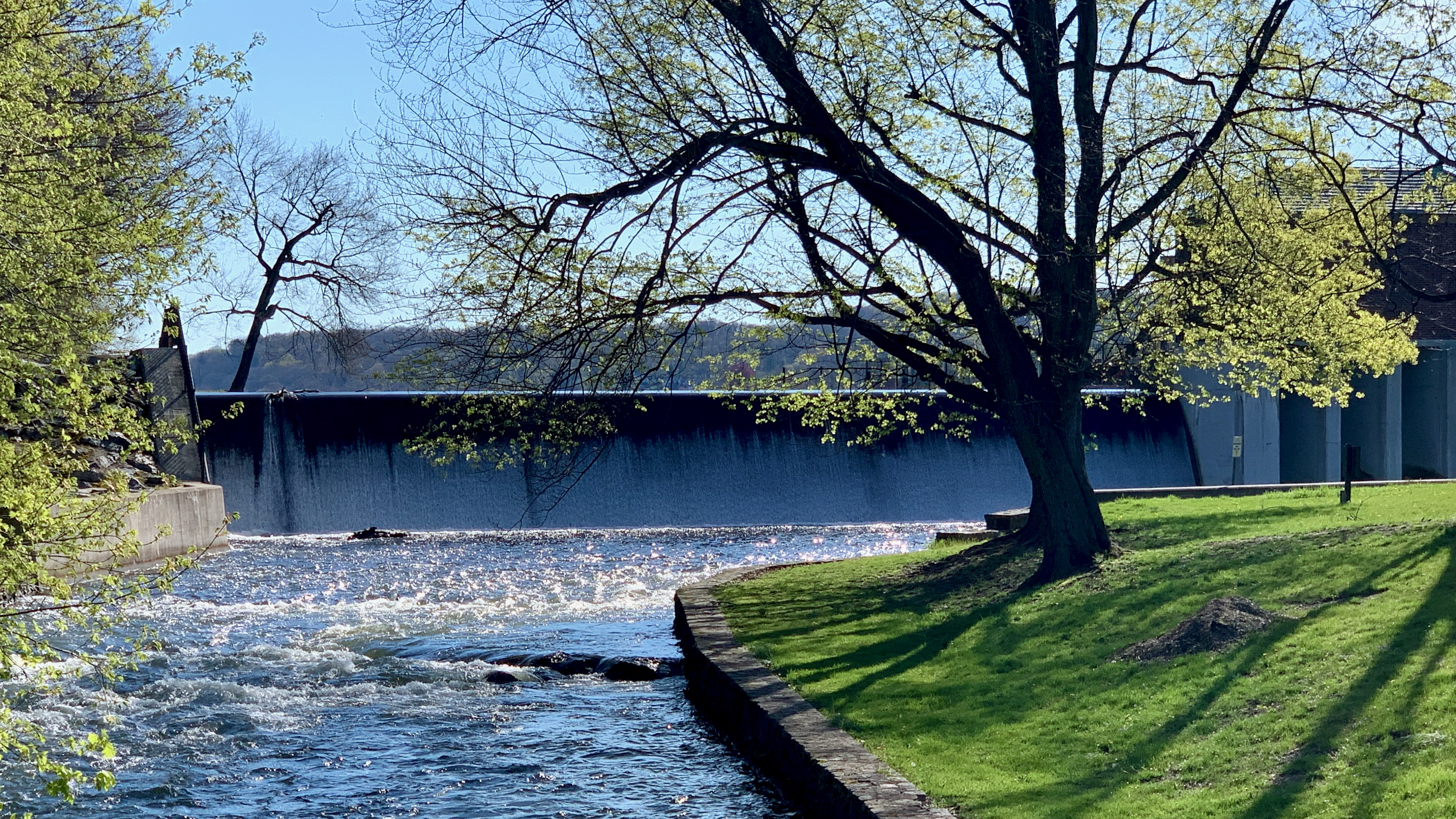
Source of the river at the Lake Hopatcong Dam

It rises out of Lake Hopatcong, on the border between the borough of Hopatcong in Sussex County and the township of Roxbury in Morris County. It flows through Lake Musconetcong, then flows southwest, through Hackettstown, past Stephensburg and New Hampton, passing south of Washington then along the southeastern side of the Pohatcong Mountain ridge. It joins the Delaware at Riegelsville, approximately 10 mi (16 km) south of Phillipsburg.

The river does not flow through any large population center and has been the site of relatively little industrial development throughout its history. In the 18th century, the surrounding hills were largely deforested as a source of charcoal for the iron industry in the surrounding region. The local industry declined by the middle of the 19th century after the building of the former Morris Canal, the course of which ran along the upper river, to bring coal from Pennsylvania to northern New Jersey. After the demise of the canal from the introduction of railroads in the late 19th century, the dam pools along the river that supplied the canal became the site of a popular summer cottage industry. Silted remnants of the pools, as well as the remnants of the canal itself, can still be seen along the river.

Human habitation in the Musconetcong Valley can be traced back approximately 12,000 years to the end of the last ice age. The Plenge Site along the lower river in Warren County was the first of only two major Paleo-Indian archaeological site excavations in New Jersey, and is considered one of the most significant in the northeastern United States.

The USGS stream flow gauge at Bloomsbury has the river's flows recorded from as far back as 1904. The average flow over the time recorded for the gauge at Bloomsbury is approximately 244 cfs. Record flows of the river were recorded in 2011 as result of Hurricane Irene.

According to an urban legend, the river is also home to a creature known as the Musconetcong River Mantis Man, a somewhat humanoid, somewhat insect-like creature.

== See also ==
- List of rivers of New Jersey
- Lake Musconetcong
