= Bloomsbury School District =

School district in Hunterdon County, New Jersey, US

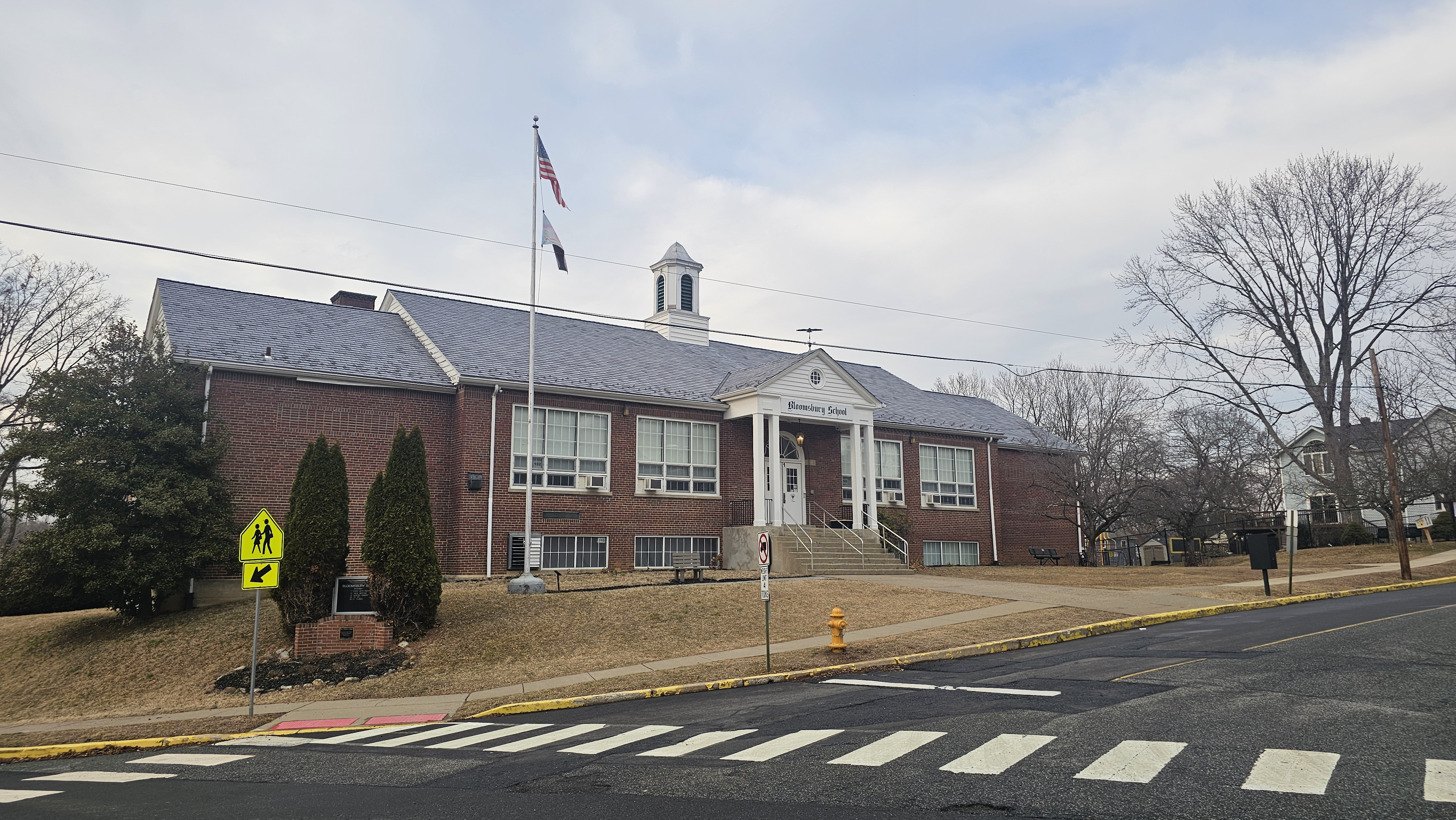
- Bloomsbury Public School, the only school in the district

Address
- 20 Main Street Bloomsbury, Hunterdon County, New Jersey, 08804
- Coordinates: 40.65682°N 75.081959°W

District information
- Grades: PreK to 8
- Superintendent: Jenniffer Marycz
- Business administrator: Timothy Mantz
- Schools: 1

Students and staff
- Enrollment: 98 (as of 2023–24)
- Faculty: 15.4 FTEs
- Student–teacher ratio: 6.4:1

Other information
- District Factor Group: GH
- Website: bburyes.org
Ind.	Per pupil	District spending	Rank (*)	K-8 average	%± vs. average
1A	Total Spending	$16,048	7	$18,891	−15.0%
1	Budgetary Cost	15,430	38	14,159	9.0%
2	Classroom Instruction	9,699	47	8,659	12.0%
6	Support Services	2,242	27	2,167	3.5%
8	Administrative Cost	1,811	50	1,547	17.1%
10	Operations & Maintenance	1,639	25	1,612	1.7%
13	Extracurricular Activities	38	14	104	−63.5%
16	Median Teacher Salary	57,236	31	61,136
Data from NJDoE 2014 Taxpayers' Guide to Education Spending. *Of K-8 districts with up to 400 students. Lowest spending=1; Highest=71

The Bloomsbury School District is a community public school district that serves students in pre-kindergarten through eighth grade from Bloomsbury, in Hunterdon County, in the U.S. state of New Jersey.

As of the 2023–24 school year, the district, comprised of one school, had an enrollment of 98 students and 15.4 classroom teachers (on an FTE basis), for a student–teacher ratio of 6.4:1. In the 2016–17 school year, the district had the 11th-smallest enrollment of any school district in the state.

The district participates in the Interdistrict Public School Choice Program, having been approved on November 2, 1999, as one of the first ten districts statewide to participate in the program, which allows non-resident students to attend school in the district at no cost to their parents, with tuition covered by the resident district. Available slots are announced annually by grade.

Public school students in ninth through twelfth grades attend Phillipsburg High School in Phillipsburg in Warren County, as part of a sending/receiving relationship with the Phillipsburg School District. The high school also serves students from four other sending communities: Alpha, Greenwich Township, Lopatcong Township and Pohatcong Township. As of the 2023–24 school year, the high school had an enrollment of 1,799 students and 139.5 classroom teachers (on an FTE basis), for a student–teacher ratio of 12.9:1. The district has sought to end its relationship with Phillipsburg as part of its goal to become part of the North Hunterdon-Voorhees Regional High School District. Residents of Bloomsbury will vote in November 2026 in a referendum to join as a constituent member of the North Hunterdon-Voorhees district .

== History ==
In 2016, the district announced that it was pursuing a $30,000 study to consider merger / consolidation with the Greenwich Township School District in Warren County, citing the "financial instability" the Bloomsbury district faces based on the way the Phillipsburg district calculates the costs for students sent for high school. The notice to residents announcing the feasibility study stated that the Greenwich district was chosen based on the quality of its academic programs, shared superintendent and business administrator, proximity, financial stability and shared sending relationship with Phillipsburg for high school.

The district had been classified by the New Jersey Department of Education as being in District Factor Group "GH", the third-highest of eight groupings. District Factor Groups organize districts statewide to allow comparison by common socioeconomic characteristics of the local districts. From lowest socioeconomic status to highest, the categories are A, B, CD, DE, FG, GH, I and J.

== School ==
Bloomsbury Public School served an enrollment of 98 students in grades PreK–8 as of the 2023–24 school year.

- Jenniffer Marycz, principal

== Administration ==
Core members of the district's administration are:

- Jenniffer Marycz, superintendent
- Timothy Mantz, business administrator and board secretary

== Board of education ==
The district's board of education is comprised of five members who set policy and oversee the fiscal and educational operation of the district through its administration. As a Type II school district, the board's trustees are elected directly by voters to serve three-year terms of office on a staggered basis, with either one or two seats up for election each year held (since 2012) as part of the November general election. The board appoints a superintendent to oversee the district's day-to-day operations and a business administrator to supervise the business functions of the district.
