= Greenwich Township School District (Warren County, New Jersey) =

School district in Warren County, New Jersey, US

Coordinates: 40.680723°N 75.129237°W

Address
- 101 Wyndham Farm Boulevard Stewartsville, Warren County, New Jersey, 08886; United States

District information
- Grades: PreK-8
- Superintendent: Tina Neely
- Business administrator: Tim Mantz
- Schools: 2

Students and staff
- Enrollment: 631 (as of 2023–24)
- Faculty: 54.0 FTEs
- Student–teacher ratio: 11.7:1

Other information
- District Factor Group: I
- Website: District website
Ind.	Per pupil	District spending	Rank (*)	K-8 average	%± vs. average
1A	Total Spending	$13,645	2	$18,891	−27.8%
1	Budgetary Cost	9,828	2	14,159	−30.6%
2	Classroom Instruction	6,132	2	8,659	−29.2%
6	Support Services	1,516	9	2,167	−30.0%
8	Administrative Cost	1,153	4	1,547	−25.5%
10	Operations & Maintenance	1,001	3	1,612	−37.9%
16	Median Teacher Salary	54,719	12	61,136
Data from NJDoE 2014 Taxpayers' Guide to Education Spending. *Of K-8 districts with more than 750 students. Lowest spending=1; Highest=84

The Greenwich Township School District is a comprehensive community public school district that serves students in pre-kindergarten through eighth grade from Greenwich Township, in Warren County, in the U.S. state of New Jersey.

As of the 2023–24 school year, the district, comprised of two schools, had an enrollment of 631 students and 54.0 classroom teachers (on an FTE basis), for a student–teacher ratio of 11.7:1.

The district participates in the Interdistrict Public School Choice Program, which allows non-resident students to attend school in the district at no cost to their parents, with tuition covered by the resident district. Available slots are announced annually by grade.

Public school students in ninth through twelfth grades attend Phillipsburg High School in Phillipsburg, which serves students from the Town of Phillipsburg as part of a sending/receiving relationship with the Phillipsburg School District. The high school also serves students from four other sending communities: Alpha, Bloomsbury (in Hunterdon County), Lopatcong Township and Pohatcong Township. As of the 2023–24 school year, the high school had an enrollment of 1,799 students and 139.5 classroom teachers (on an FTE basis), for a student–teacher ratio of 12.9:1.

== History ==
In 2016, the Bloomsbury School District announced that it was pursuing a $30,000 study to consider merger / consolidation with the Greenwich Township School District, citing the "financial instability" the Bloomsbury district faces based on the way the Phillipsburg district calculates the costs for students sent for high school. The notice to residents announcing the feasibility study stated that the Greenwich district was chosen based on the quality of its academic programs, shared superintendent and business administrator, proximity, financial stability and shared sending relationship with Phillipsburg for high school.

The district had been classified by the New Jersey Department of Education as being in District Factor Group "I", the second-highest of eight groupings. District Factor Groups organize districts statewide to allow comparison by common socioeconomic characteristics of the local districts. From lowest socioeconomic status to highest, the categories are A, B, CD, DE, FG, GH, I and J.

== Schools ==
Schools in the district (with 2023–24 enrollment data from the National Center for Education Statistics) are:

- Greenwich Elementary School with 420 students in grades pre-kindergarten to 5
  - Nichole Hutnik, principal
- Stewartsville Middle School with 209 students in grades 6–8
  - Joel Barrett, principal

== Administration ==
Core members of the district's administration are:

- Tina Neely, superintendent of schools
- Tim Mantz, school business administrator and board secretary

== Board of education ==
The district's board of education, comprised of nine members, sets policy and oversees the fiscal and educational operation of the district through its administration. As a Type II school district, the board's trustees are elected directly by voters to serve three-year terms of office on a staggered basis, with three seats up for election each year held (since 2014) as part of the November general election. The board appoints a superintendent to oversee the district's day-to-day operations and a business administrator to supervise the business functions of the district.
