= Greenwich Township School District =

Greenwich Township School District is the name of several school districts in the United States:

- Greenwich Township School District (Cumberland County, New Jersey)
- Greenwich Township School District (Gloucester County, New Jersey)
- Greenwich Township School District (Warren County, New Jersey)
