= Delaware Park =

Delaware Park may refer to the following places in the United States:

- Delaware Park (Buffalo), part of the Delaware Park–Front Park System in Buffalo, New York
- Delaware Park, New Jersey, a CDP in Warren County, New Jersey
- Delaware Park (casino), American horse racing track, casino, and golf course near Wilmington, Delaware
