= Lopatcong Overlook, New Jersey =

Populated place in Warren County, New Jersey, US

- Census-designated place
- Location in Warren County Location in New Jersey Location in the United States
- Coordinates: 40.697399°N 75.145302°W
- Country: United States
- State: New Jersey
- County: Warren
- Township: Lopatcong

Area
  - Total: 0.37 sq mi (0.96 km^{2})
  - Land: 0.37 sq mi (0.96 km^{2})
  - Water: 0 sq mi (0.00 km^{2}) 0.00%
- Elevation: 360 ft (110 m)

Population (2020)
  - Total: 692
  - Density: 1,874.1/sq mi (723.58/km^{2})
- Time zone: UTC−05:00 (Eastern (EST))
  - Summer (DST): UTC−04:00 (Eastern (EDT))
- ZIP Code: 08865 - Lopatcong
- Area code: 908
- FIPS code: 34-41495
- GNIS feature ID: 02584008

Lopatcong Overlook is an unincorporated community and census-designated place (CDP) in Lopatcong Township, New Jersey, United States, that was created as part of the 2010 United States census. As of the 2020 census, Lopatcong Overlook had a population of 692.

== Geography ==
According to the United States Census Bureau, Lopatcong Overlook had a total area of 0.345 square miles (0.895 km^{2}), all of which was land.

== Demographics ==
Historical population
Census	Pop.	Note	%±
2010	734		—
2020	692		−5.7%
Population sources: 2010 2020

Lopatcong Overlook first appeared as a census designated place in the 2010 U.S. census.

=== 2020 census ===
Lopatcong Overlook CDP, New Jersey – Racial and ethnic composition Note: the US Census treats Hispanic/Latino as an ethnic category. This table excludes Latinos from the racial categories and assigns them to a separate category. Hispanics/Latinos may be of any race.
Race / Ethnicity (NH = Non-Hispanic)	Pop 2010	Pop 2020	% 2010	% 2020
White alone (NH)	548	534	74.66%	77.17%
Black or African American alone (NH)	74	53	10.08%	7.66%
Native American or Alaska Native alone (NH)	0	0	0.00%	0.00%
Asian alone (NH)	29	19	3.95%	2.75%
Native Hawaiian or Pacific Islander alone (NH)	0	0	0.00%	0.00%
Other race alone (NH)	0	0	0.00%	0.00%
Mixed race or Multiracial (NH)	11	9	1.50%	1.30%
Hispanic or Latino (any race)	72	77	9.81%	11.13%
Total	734	692	100.00%	100.00%

As of the 2020 United States census, the population was 692.

=== 2010 census ===
The 2010 United States census counted 734 people, 369 households, and 198 families in the CDP. The population density was 2,125.0 per square mile (820.5/km^{2}). There were 390 housing units at an average density of 1,129.1 per square mile (435.9/km^{2}). The racial makeup was 81.61% (599) White, 10.35% (76) Black or African American, 0.00% (0) Native American, 3.95% (29) Asian, 0.00% (0) Pacific Islander, 1.36% (10) from other races, and 2.72% (20) from two or more races. Hispanic or Latino of any race were 9.81% (72) of the population.

Of the 369 households, 19.0% had children under the age of 18; 38.8% were married couples living together; 11.7% had a female householder with no husband present and 46.3% were non-families. Of all households, 39.6% were made up of individuals and 13.0% had someone living alone who was 65 years of age or older. The average household size was 1.99 and the average family size was 2.67.

16.9% of the population were under the age of 18, 2.6% from 18 to 24, 38.0% from 25 to 44, 24.8% from 45 to 64, and 17.7% who were 65 years of age or older. The median age was 41.2 years. For every 100 females, the population had 74.8 males. For every 100 females ages 18 and older there were 70.9 males.
