= Lou Reda =

American filmmaker

- Born: January 31, 1925. Phillipsburg, New Jersey, U.S.
- Died: September 30, 2017 (aged 92); Lopatcong Township, New Jersey, U.S.
- Occupation: Filmmaker
- Known for: Specializing in television documentaries

Louis J. Reda (January 31, 1925 – September 30, 2017) was an American filmmaker, specializing in television documentaries, who produced some 30 productions, as chairman of Lou Reda Productions, based in Easton, Pennsylvania. Reda's production company has been called "the largest producer of programs for the A&E and History Channel cable operations", accounting for some 10% of the material shown on the two cable networks. Productions by Reda's firm include The Last Stand of the Tin Can Sailors.

Reda was from Phillipsburg, New Jersey. He enlisted in the United States Navy in 1942 during his freshman year at Phillipsburg High School and was initially assigned to duty as a deep sea diver.

A resident of Lopatcong Township, New Jersey, Reda died at the age of 92 on September 30, 2017.
