= Martin O. May =

United States Army Medal of Honor recipient (1922–1945)

- Born: April 18, 1922; Phillipsburg, New Jersey, US
- Died: April 21, 1945 (aged 23) legusuku-Yama, Ie Shima, Ryukyu Islands
- Burial place: National Memorial Cemetery of the Pacific, Honolulu, Hawaii
- Military career
- Allegiance: United States of America
- Branch: United States Army
- Service years: 1942–1945
- Rank: Private First Class
- Units: 307th Infantry Regiment, 77th Infantry Division
- Conflicts: World War II: Battle of Okinawa †
- Awards: Medal of Honor

Martin O. May (April 18, 1922 – April 21, 1945) was a United States Army soldier and a recipient of the United States military's highest decoration—the Medal of Honor—for his actions in World War II.

== Biography ==
Born and raised in Phillipsburg, New Jersey, May graduated from Phillipsburg High School in the class of 1941.

May joined the Army from Phillipsburg in November 1942, and by April 19, 1945, was serving as a private first class in the 307th Infantry Regiment, 77th Infantry Division. On that day and the next two days, at legusuku-Yama on Ie Shima in the Ryukyu Islands during the Battle of Okinawa, he manned his machine gun despite intense Japanese fire. He repeatedly refused to withdraw, even after being seriously wounded, and held his ground until being killed. For these actions, he was posthumously awarded the Medal of Honor on January 25, 1946.

May, aged 23 at his death, was buried at the National Memorial Cemetery of the Pacific in Honolulu, Hawaii.

== Medal of Honor citation ==
Private First Class May's official Medal of Honor citation reads:

He gallantly maintained a 3-day stand in the face of terrible odds when American troops fought for possession of the rugged slopes of legusuku-Yama on Ie Shima, Ryukyu Islands. After placing his heavy machinegun in an advantageous yet vulnerable position on a ridge to support riflemen, he became the target of fierce mortar and small arms fire from counterattacking Japanese. He repulsed this assault by sweeping the enemy with accurate bursts while explosions and ricocheting bullets threw blinding dust and dirt about him. He broke up a second counterattack by hurling grenades into the midst of the enemy forces, and then refused to withdraw, volunteering to maintain his post and cover the movement of American riflemen as they reorganized to meet any further hostile action. The major effort of the enemy did not develop until the morning of 21 April. It found Pfc. May still supporting the rifle company in the face of devastating rifle, machinegun, and mortar fire. While many of the friendly troops about him became casualties, he continued to fire his machinegun until he was severely wounded and his gun rendered useless by the burst of a mortar shell. Refusing to withdraw from the violent action, he blasted fanatical Japanese troops with hand grenades until wounded again, this time mortally. By his intrepidity and the extreme tenacity with which he held firm until death against overwhelming forces, Pfc. May killed at least 16 Japanese, was largely responsible for maintaining the American lines, and inspired his comrades to efforts which later resulted in complete victory and seizure of the mountain stronghold.

== Awards and decorations ==

Badge	Combat Infantryman Badge		
1st row	Medal of Honor		Bronze Star Medal
2nd row	Purple Heart with 1 Oak leaf cluster	Army Good Conduct Medal	American Campaign Medal
3rd row	Asiatic-Pacific Campaign Medal with Arrowhead Device and 3 Campaign stars	World War II Victory Medal	Philippine Liberation Medal
Unit awards	Presidential Unit Citation		Philippine Presidential Unit Citation

== See also ==
- List of Medal of Honor recipients
- List of Medal of Honor recipients for World War II

== Sources ==
- "Medal of Honor recipients - World War II (M-S)". Medal of Honor citations. United States Army Center of Military History. June 8, 2009. Archived from the original on December 21, 2007.
