= Harold Curry =

American lawyer and politician (1932–2022)

Harold J. Curry (June 7, 1932 – March 21, 2022) was an American lawyer and politician.

Curry was born in Phillipsburg, and graduated from Phillipsburg High School in 1949. Curry served in the United States Army from 1953 to 1955 and was commissioned a first lieutenant. He graduated from Lafayette College in 1953 and received his law degree from Rutgers Law School in 1958. He was admitted to the New Jersey bar and practiced law in Phillipsburg. Curry served in the New Jersey General Assembly from 1964 to 1968.

New Jersey General Assembly
Preceded by Robert E. Frederick	Member of the New Jersey General Assembly from the Warren County district January 14, 1964–January 9, 1968	Succeeded by Constituency abolished
