= Harold S. Sloan =

American economist

Harold Stephenson Sloan (1888 – November 5, 1988) was an economist who wrote extensively and taught in the field of economics. He served as the executive director of the Alfred P. Sloan Foundation, which was established by his older brother, who was the President and chief executive officer of General Motors.

Raised in Brooklyn, Sloan manufactured electronic equipment after graduating from Columbia University with undergraduate and graduate degrees. He shifted to the field of education in 1925, teaching and serving on the faculty at Fairleigh Dickinson University. Montclair State University, New York University and at Teachers College, Columbia University. He was the author of the 1936 book Today's Economics. FDU elected him as a trustee of the university in 1963. He co-authored the 1948 text Dictionary of Economics with Arnold J. Zurcher; the book's third edition, published in 1953, was described by The New York Times as being "considerably more than its name implies" for its inclusion of entries regarding economic history and major court decisions.

From 1936 to 1945, he served as vice president and executive director of the Alfred P. Sloan Foundation, which had been established by his brother. In 1941, he developed a program to teach lessons on economic self-sufficiency to "ill-fed, ill-clothed and ill-housed" schoolchildren in Florida and Kentucky who would be able to bring the lessons they learned in school back to their homes to benefit the economic condition of clothing food and shelter for their entire family, as part of $340,000 in grants from the foundation towards popular economics education. As described in The New York Times, he indicated that people of all socioeconomic levels must gain a basic understanding of economics "if American democracy is to hold its own against dictatorship." Sloan stated that "the very stability of our economic culture and of society depend ultimately upon rational economic thinking by the citizenry at large."

A resident of Lopatcong Township, New Jersey, he died at the age of 100 on November 5, 1988. He was survived by a son. His wife, Bertha, whom he had married in 1910, had died in 1978.
