= Several Ways to Die Trying =

- Directed by: Glen Tickle
- Written by: Glen Tickle
- Produced by: Stephanie Bello
- Starring: Dan Van Winkle; Megan Finnegan
- Cinematography: Matthew Ziegel; Justin Ulbrich
- Release date: 2005
- Running time: 96 minutes
- Country: United States
- Language: English

Several Ways to Die Trying is an independent film made in 2005 by a group of college students and recent graduates.

The film was mostly shot in Lopatcong Township, New Jersey, United States. The film's writer/director as well as members of the cast and crew are residents of the township.

== Plot ==
Several Ways to Die Trying is about a young man who wants to kill himself when no one will publish his first novel, a choose-your-own-adventure book where the outcome is always death, but can't because he has writer's block on his suicide note. While hiking to try to clear his head he encounters Molly Usie, an outcast who is determined to befriend him.

Eventually he falls for Molly, but has to decide if she's worth living for.

== Cast and crew ==
Credited Cast

- Dan Van Winkle .... D'Artagnan Mark
- Megan Finnegan .... Molly 'Mouse' Usie
- Rocco Stefani .... Mr. Usie
- Jenny Lynn Luther .... Mrs. Mark
- Jeff White .... Lucky

Additional Cast

- Matthew Ziegel .... Baker
- Brian Dieck .... Guildenstern
- Keith Tickle .... Rosencrantz
- Andrea Jiorle .... Girl Jogger 1
- Stephanie Rath Tickle .... Girl Jogger 2
- Danielle Cogan .... Doris
- Amanda Collinge .... Girl Jogger 3

Credited Crew

- Glen Tickle .... Director/Writer
- Stephanie Bello .... Producer
- Brian Dieck .... Editor/Assistant Director/Cinematographer
- Matthew Ziegel .... Cinematographer
- Justin Ulbrich .... Cinematographer
- Matthew Sienzant .... Sound Recordist/Editor

Additional crew members

- Stephanie Rath Tickle .... Animal Wrangler
- Keith Tickle .... Production Assistant
- Michael Haller .... Weather Consultant
- Caiti Rodel .... Props Master

== DVD ==
Several Ways to Die Trying: Wide Ruled Edition was released on DVD on December 15, 2009 through mainly online distribution. It is available for rental through Netflix.

== Premiere ==
The film premiered at the 2005 Cape May New Jersey State Film Festival to a sold out theater on November 19, 2005, as one of the festivals "Best of Festival" selections. Ron Rollet, the festival's curator called the film "Simply the best narrative feature ever submitted to the festival."

== Awards ==
The screenplay for the film was a quarterfinalist in the 2005 Nicholl Fellowships in Screenwriting Competition.

The film was a "Best of Festival" Selection in the 2005 Cape May New Jersey State Film Festival.
