= Ted Dailey =

American football player (1908–1992)

No. 22
- Position: End

Personal information
- Born: September 25, 1909; Phillipsburg, New Jersey, U.S.
- Died: October 3, 1992 (aged 83); Syracuse, New York, U.S.
- Listed height: 5 ft 9 in (1.75 m)
- Listed weight: 170 lb (77 kg)

Career information
- High school: Phillipsburg (New Jersey)
- College: Pittsburgh (1929–1932)

Career history
- Pittsburgh Pirates (1933)
- Stats at Pro Football Reference

Theodore E. Dailey (September 25, 1908 – October 3, 1992) was an American professional football end who played one season in the National Football League (NFL) with the Pittsburgh Pirates. He played college football at the University of Pittsburgh.

== Early life and college ==
Theodore E. Dailey was born on September 25, 1908, in Phillipsburg, New Jersey. He attended Phillipsburg High School in Phillipsburg and was a left end on the football team for three seasons.

He was a member of the Pittsburgh Panthers football team from 1929 to 1932 and was a three-year letterman from 1930 to 1932. He was named an All-American his senior year.

== Professional career ==
Dailey signed with the Pittsburgh Pirates of the National Football League in 1933. He played in 10 games, starting four, for the Pirates during their inaugural 1933 season, catching seven passes for 66 yards and rushing once for one yard. The Pirates finished the year with a 3–6–2 record, fifth place in the Eastern Division. He quit pro football after the season to become a high school football coach.

== Later life ==
Dailey was a high school football coach after his playing career. He died on October 3, 1992, in Syracuse, New York.
