= Bill Walsh (American football, born 1927) =

American football player and coach (1927–2012)

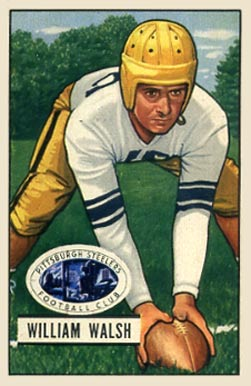
- Walsh on a 1951 Bowman football card

No. 46, 56
- Position: Center

Personal information
- Born: September 8, 1927; Phillipsburg, New Jersey, U.S.
- Died: May 13, 2012 (aged 84); Atlanta, Georgia, U.S.
- Listed height: 6 ft 2 in (1.88 m)
- Listed weight: 230 lb (104 kg)

Career information
- High school: Phillipsburg
- College: Notre Dame
- NFL draft: 1949: 3rd round, 26th overall pick

Career history

Playing
- Pittsburgh Steelers (1949–1954)

Coaching
- Notre Dame (1955–1958) Offensive line coach; Kansas State (1959) Offensive line coach; Dallas Texans/Kansas City Chiefs (1960–1974) Offensive line coach; Atlanta Falcons (1975–1982) Offensive line coach; Houston Oilers (1983–1986) Offensive line coach; Philadelphia Eagles (1987–1991) Offensive line coach

Awards and highlights
- Super Bowl champion (IV); 2× AFL champion (1962, 1966); First-team All-Pro (1954); Second-team All-Pro (1952); 2× Pro Bowl (1950, 1951); 2× National champion (1946, 1947)

Career NFL statistics
- Games played: 72
- Games started: 69
- Fumble recoveries: 4
- Stats at Pro Football Reference

William Henry Walsh (September 8, 1927 – May 13, 2012) was an American professional football center who played six seasons in the National Football League (NFL), all with the Pittsburgh Steelers. Walsh then coached in both college and professional football between 1955 and 1991.

Walsh was born September 8, 1927, in Phillipsburg, New Jersey, where he played prep football at Phillipsburg High School before graduating in 1945, and then attended the University of Notre Dame.
