= Brandon Scott Mason =

American football player (born 1986)

No. 27
- Position: Running back

Personal information
- Born: July 18, 1986 (age 40); Easton, Pennsylvania, U.S.
- Listed height: 6 ft 2 in (1.88 m)
- Listed weight: 225 lb (102 kg)

Career information
- High school: Phillipsburg
- College: University of Pittsburgh

Brandon Scott Mason (born July 18, 1986) is an American journalist and former football player. He played college football at the University of Pittsburgh and Stony Brook University.

Since he ended his football career, Mason hosts The Brandon Mason Show, where he talks about sports. He appeared on The Howard Stern Show speaking about the importance of health and fitness.

== Early life and education ==
He received several accolades and awards during his time at Philipsburg High School in Phillipsburg, New Jersey, including High School Heisman, Gatorade Player of the Year, MVP of the Governor's Bowl featuring New York vs New Jersey, The Express-Times Player of the Year as a Running Back and All-State Awards as a Defensive Back. His highlights earned him a Division 1A football scholarship to the University of Pittsburgh.

== American football career ==
=== College ===
Mason started his college football career at the University of Pittsburgh where he played under coach Walt Harris. Mason started as a kick-returner as a true freshman and shared time at the running back position. His freshman year, he also started for the Pittsburgh Panthers in the Fiesta Bowl. Pittsburgh won a share of The Big East Conference championship and were awarded with a BCS berth to the 2005 Fiesta Bowl. The Pittsburgh Panthers had a coaching change heading into his sophomore season, and Mason decided to transfer to Stony Brook University where he continued to play college football. He started running for the Seawolves and led the team in touchdowns as a Junior.

=== NFL ===
Mason had personal workouts with the New York Giants and the Miami Dolphins following group workouts with the Green Bay Packers and San Francisco 49ers at Test Sports in New Jersey. He stayed on NFL draft boards into the late rounds, but was held up by a knee injury.

== Television career ==
Mason appeared on The Howard Stern Show, where he revealed that he was High Pitch Erik's trainer for six months to help him meet the challenge of losing 100 pounds. Also, Mason hosts The Brandon Mason Show on YouTube, where he talks about sports.

== Awards ==
2013: Phillipsburg/Easton Football Hall of Fame
