= Phillipsburg High School (New Jersey) =

High school in Warren County, New Jersey, US

Location
- 1 Stateliner Boulevard; Phillipsburg, Warren County, New Jersey 08865; United States
- 40.713731°N 75.183139°W

Information
- Type: Public high school
- Established: 1871
- School district: Phillipsburg School District
- NCES School ID: 341296005852
- Principal: Kyle Rovi
- Faculty: 140.0 FTEs
- Grades: 9th–12th
- Enrollment: 1,750 (as of 2024–25)
- Student to teacher ratio: 12.5:1
- Campus type: Rural: Fringe
- Colors: Garnet and Gray
- Athletics conference: Skyland Conference (general); Big Central Football Conference (football)
- Mascot: Suzy Stateliner
- Team name: Stateliners
- Rival: Easton Area High School
- Accreditation: Middle States Association of Colleges and Schools
- Newspaper: Karux
- Yearbook: Karux
- Website: phs.pburgsd.net

Phillipsburg High School is a comprehensive, four-year public high school located in Phillipsburg, in Warren County, in the U.S. state of New Jersey. Because of the town's proximity to the border between New Jersey and Pennsylvania the school's nickname is the "Stateliners." The school was first established in 1871. The school has been accredited by the Middle States Association of Colleges and Schools Commission on Elementary and Secondary Schools since 2000.

The school is part of the Phillipsburg School District, one of 31 former Abbott districts statewide that were established pursuant to the decision by the New Jersey Supreme Court in Abbott v. Burke which are now referred to as "SDA Districts" based on the requirement for the state to cover all costs for school building and renovation projects in these districts under the supervision of the New Jersey Schools Development Authority. The district serves students from Phillipsburg and from five other municipalities: Alpha, Bloomsbury (in Hunterdon County), Greenwich Township, Lopatcong Township and Pohatcong Township, who attend as part of sending/receiving relationships.

The site of the new Phillipsburg High School, which began construction in January 2014, is in Lopatcong Township, with the site of the old school converted for use as Phillipsburg Middle School. The three-story, 330,000-square-foot (31,000 m^{2}) building, with more than double the floor space of the existing high school and a capacity to accommodate more than 2,100 students, was completed for the 2016–17 school year and was dedicated in September 2016 at ceremonies attended by Governor of New Jersey Chris Christie. Phillipsburg High School's enrollment had been in excess of the school's capacity. To compensate for this, the Phillipsburg School District purchased or leased 31 trailers.

As of the 2024–25 school year, the school had an enrollment of 1,750 students and 140.0 classroom teachers (on an FTE basis), for a student–teacher ratio of 12.5:1. There were 737 students (42.1% of enrollment) eligible for free lunch and 83 (4.7% of students) eligible for reduced-cost lunch.

== Rankings ==
The school was the 183rd-ranked public high school in New Jersey out of 339 schools statewide in New Jersey Monthly magazine's September 2014 cover story on the state's "Top Public High Schools", using a new ranking methodology. The school had been ranked 215th in the state of 328 schools in 2012, after being ranked 276th in 2010 out of 322 schools listed. The magazine ranked the school 275th in 2008 out of 316 schools. The school was ranked 234th in the magazine's September 2006 issue, which surveyed 316 schools across the state.

== New high school ==
Original plans for a new high school campus had stalled due to lack of funds by the New Jersey Schools Construction Corporation. In July 2008, new state funding was secured and on October 5, 2009, a groundbreaking ceremony was held at the site of the new high school located on Belvidere Road in Lopatcong Township. Then-Governor Jon Corzine was in attendance as well as former Governor James Florio, Phillipsburg School District Superintendent Mark B. Miller and then-State Education Commissioner Lucille Davy.

The new campus had been expected to cost $174.4 million and was planned to hold a 326,000 sq ft (30,300 m^{2}) school and seven athletic fields. After the initial plans had been put on hold, Governor Chris Christie announced in February 2012 that the plan was back online, with a revised estimate of $675 million for the project. Initial contracts were awarded in 2013, with a projected open date for the 2016–17 school year. After many delays, construction started in January 2014 and the new school opened on September 12, 2016. The class of 2020 will be the first to have never attended the old high school building.

== Athletics ==
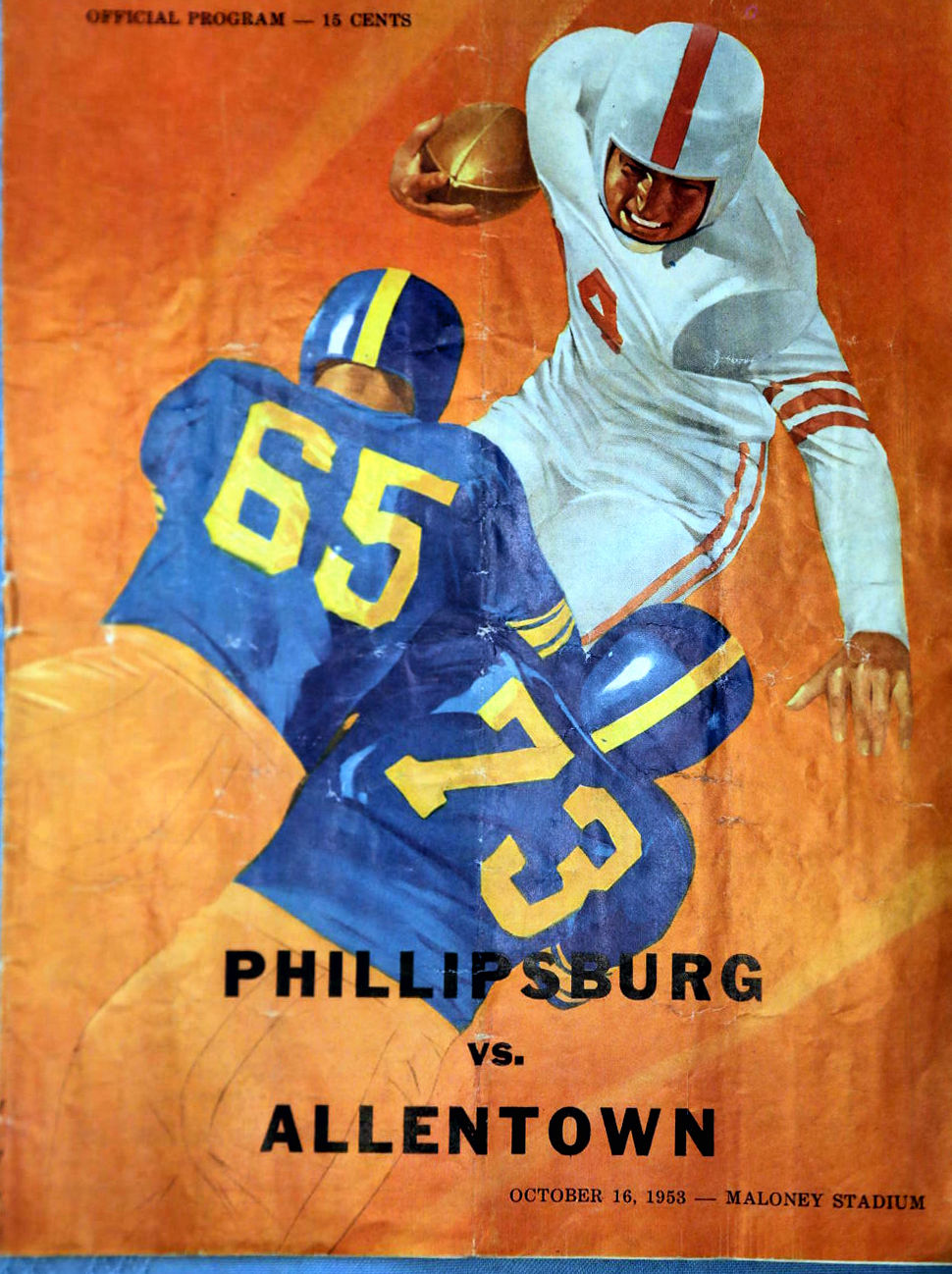
The program for the Phillipsburg football game against Allen High School at J. Birney Crum Stadium in Allentown on October 16, 1958

The Phillipsburg High School Stateliners compete as a member of the Skyland Conference, which is comprised of public and private high schools in Hunterdon, Somerset, and Warren counties. The school operates under the supervision of the New Jersey State Interscholastic Athletic Association (NJSIAA). With 1,242 students in grades 10-12, the school was classified by the NJSIAA for the 2019–20 school year as Group IV for most athletic competition purposes, which included schools with an enrollment of 1,060 to 5,049 students in that grade range.

The football team competes in Division 5B of the Big Central Football Conference, which includes 60 public and private high schools in Hunterdon, Middlesex, Somerset, Union and Warren counties, which are broken down into 10 divisions by size and location. The school was classified by the NJSIAA as Group IV North for football for 2024–2026, which included schools with 893 to 1,315 students. The school had been a member of the Pennsylvania Interscholastic Athletic Association's East Penn Conference, which was later rolled into the Eastern Pennsylvania Conference, a highly competitive conference of the largest high schools in eastern and northeastern Pennsylvania.

=== Boys basketball ===
The boys' basketball team won the Group III state championship in 1983, defeating Ewing High School in the tournament final.

=== Boys cross country ===
In 2005, the boys cross country team won the New Jersey Group IV state championship and placed 3rd at the Meet of Champions. The team finished the season ranked 10th in the Nike Team Nationals Northeast region rankings.

=== Field hockey ===
The field hockey team won the Central sectional championship in 1972, won the North II Group III state sectional title in 1977, the North I / II Group IV title in 1998 and the North II Group IV title in 1999 and 2021. They captured their first H/W/S county championship in 2023.

=== Football ===
The football team won the North II Group III state championship in 1977 and 2008, the North II Group IV in 2001, 2005, 2009, 2013, 2014 and 2018. By the end of the 2019 season, the football program had a total of 703 wins in 114 seasons of play, which include 14 state sectional championships. Down 7-0, the 2001 team pulled ahead to win with a last-minute touchdown in a 10-7 victory against Montclair High School in the North II Group IV sectional final. In 2008, the Stateliners completed a 10–2 season beating Rahway High School by a score of 20–6 in the North II Group III state sectional final to win the program's fourth sectional title. 2008 postseason rankings put the Stateliners at 13th in the state, 1st in West Jersey, and 5th in Group III. The 2018 team won the North II Group IV sectional title with a 42-7 win against Irvington High School

==== Easton Area High School rivalry ====
The Stateliners have an athletic rivalry with neighboring Easton Area High School in Easton, Pennsylvania, which celebrated its 100th annual football game on Thanksgiving 2006, making it one of the oldest rivalries in the nation. The 100th meeting between the two schools, which Easton won 21–7, was broadcast nationally on ESPN2 on Thanksgiving Day 2006. The game, which typically draws some 15,000 - 20,000 fans before Thanksgiving dinner is served, was broadcast nationally on ESPN in 1988, with games played on Lafayette College's Fisher Stadium in Easton. In 2009, the 1993 teams from the Easton / Phillipsburg game met again for the Gatorade REPLAY Game to resolve the game, which ended in a 7–7 tie, with more than 13,000 fans watching as Phillipsburg won by a score of 27–12. The rivalry between the two schools started in 1905 and became an annual game starting in 1914, but was not made a Thanksgiving tradition until 1916. Easton won the 2024 game, the 117th in the rivalry, by a score of 17–14 in overtime and holds the overall lead with a record of 68–44–5. NJ.com listed the rivalry in the second spot on their 2017 list "Ranking the 31 fiercest rivalries in N.J. HS football", saying that the only thing that kept it from being top-ranked was the fact that one of the schools is not in New Jersey.

=== Ice hockey ===
Phillipsburg High School is one of eleven Lehigh Valley-area high schools with an ice hockey team. The team competes in the Lehigh Valley Scholastic Ice Hockey League.

=== Softball ===
The softball team won the Central state title in 1972, was overall state champion in 1973 (defeating runner-up Roxbury High School in the finals) and 1975 (vs. Lenape High School), and won the Group III state championship in 1976 (vs. Mainland Regional High School). The 1975 team won the overall state title with a 3-2 win against Lenape at Mercer County Park with the winning run scored on a walk with the bases loaded.

=== Wrestling ===
The wrestling team won the North II Group III state sectional championship in 1980–1984, 1989, 1991–1996, 2003, 2004, won the North II Group IV championship in 1985–1988, 1997–2002, 2005–2008, 2012 and 2014–2019, and won the North I Group IV sectional in 2010 and 2011; the team won the Group III state championship in 1983, 1989, 1991, 1992, 1995, 1996, 2003, 2004 and 2009, and won the Group IV state title in 1986–1988, 1997–2000, 2012 and 2014–2018; and Group V in 2022. The 23 group championships are the second most of any school in the state. The team won the 2007 North II, Group IV state sectional championship with a 34–25 win against Bridgewater-Raritan High School.

== Administration ==
The school's principal is Kyle Rovi. Core members of the school's administration include four assistant principals:

== Notable alumni ==
- Charlie Berry (1902–1972), former professional baseball player, Boston Red Sox, Chicago White Sox and Philadelphia Athletics, former umpire in Major League Baseball and former professional football referee
- Ned Bolcar (born 1967), former professional football player, Miami Dolphins and Seattle Seahawks
- Tim Brewster (born 1960), former head football coach, University of Minnesota team
- Joe Buzas (1919–2003), Minor League Baseball executive and former professional baseball player, New York Yankees
- James Cipperly (born 1984, class of 2002), better known as Orange Cassidy, professional wrestler currently signed to All Elite Wrestling
- Harold Curry (1932–2022, class of 1949), lawyer and politician who served in the New Jersey General Assembly
- Ted Dailey (1908–1992), former professional football player, Pittsburgh Pirates
- D. C. Drake (born 1957), former professional wrestler and medical professional
- Justin Gaymon (born 1986, class of 2005), former 400 metre hurdler
- Brandon Scott Mason (born 1986, class of 2004), journalist and former American football player
- Martin O. May (1922–1945, class of 1941), United States Army soldier who was awarded the Medal of Honor for his actions in World War II
- Robert B. Meyner (1908–1990, class of 1926), former Governor of New Jersey
- Jen Ponton (born 1984, class of 2002), actress, Rubi in the AMC series Dietland, screenwriter, and producer
- Lou Reda (1925–2017), filmmaker who specialized in television documentaries
- Charles Rinehart (1875–1933), former professional football player, elected to the College Football Hall of Fame
- Jim Ringo (1931–2007), former professional football player, Green Bay Packers and Philadelphia Eagles, member of Pro Football Hall of Fame
- Bill Walsh (1927–2012, class of 1945), football center who played six seasons in the National Football League for the Pittsburgh Steelers
- Christina Wilson (born 1979, class of 1997), chef and reality television personality who was the winner of season 10 of the FOX Network's reality cooking show Hell's Kitchen
