= Delaware Park, New Jersey =

Populated place in Warren County, New Jersey, US

- Census-designated place
- Delaware Park's location in Warren County (Inset: Warren County in New Jersey) Delaware Park, New Jersey (New Jersey) Delaware Park, New Jersey (the United States) Delaware Park, New Jersey (New Jersey) Delaware Park, New Jersey (the United States)
- Coordinates: 40.705109°N 75.188281°W
- Country: United States
- State: New Jersey
- County: Warren
- Township: Lopatcong

Area
  - Total: 0.25 sq mi (0.64 km^{2})
  - Land: 0.25 sq mi (0.64 km^{2})
  - Water: 0 sq mi (0.00 km^{2}) 0.00%
- Elevation: 364 ft (111 m)

Population (2020)
  - Total: 739
  - Density: 3,012.4/sq mi (1,163.09/km^{2})
- Time zone: UTC−05:00 (Eastern (EST))
  - Summer (DST): UTC−04:00 (Eastern (EDT))
- ZIP Code: 08865
- Area code: 908
- FIPS code: 34-17260
- GNIS feature ID: 02583983

Delaware Park is an unincorporated community and census-designated place (CDP) located within Lopatcong Township, in Warren County, in the U.S. state of New Jersey, that was created as part of the 2010 United States census. As of the 2020 census, Delaware Park had a population of 739.

== Geography ==
According to the United States Census Bureau, the CDP had a total area of 0.246 square miles (0.637 km^{2}), all of which was land.

== Demographics ==
Historical population
Census	Pop.	Note	%±
2010	700		—
2020	739		5.6%
Population sources: 2010 2020

Delaware Park first appeared as a census designated place in the 2010 U.S. census.

=== 2020 census ===
Delaware Park CDP, New Jersey – Racial and ethnic composition Note: the US Census treats Hispanic/Latino as an ethnic category. This table excludes Latinos from the racial categories and assigns them to a separate category. Hispanics/Latinos may be of any race.
Race / Ethnicity (NH = Non-Hispanic)	Pop 2010	Pop 2020	% 2010	% 2020
White alone (NH)	641	597	91.57%	80.78%
Black or African American alone (NH)	4	18	0.57%	2.44%
Native American or Alaska Native alone (NH)	0	2	0.00%	0.27%
Asian alone (NH)	8	12	1.14%	1.62%
Native Hawaiian or Pacific Islander alone (NH)	0	0	0.00%	0.00%
Other race alone (NH)	0	9	0.00%	1.22%
Mixed race or Multiracial (NH)	7	27	1.00%	3.65%
Hispanic or Latino (any race)	40	74	5.71%	10.01%
Total	700	739	100.00%	100.00%

=== 2010 census ===
The 2010 United States census counted 700 people, 265 households, and 195 families in the CDP. The population density was 2,848.2 per square mile (1,099.7/km^{2}). There were 278 housing units at an average density of 1,131.1 per square mile (436.7/km^{2}). The racial makeup was 96.43% (675) White, 0.57% (4) Black or African American, 0.00% (0) Native American, 1.14% (8) Asian, 0.00% (0) Pacific Islander, 0.29% (2) from other races, and 1.57% (11) from two or more races. Hispanic or Latino of any race were 5.71% (40) of the population.

Of the 265 households, 34.0% had children under the age of 18; 57.7% were married couples living together; 12.5% had a female householder with no husband present and 26.4% were non-families. Of all households, 22.3% were made up of individuals and 8.3% had someone living alone who was 65 years of age or older. The average household size was 2.64 and the average family size was 3.11.

25.6% of the population were under the age of 18, 5.9% from 18 to 24, 23.3% from 25 to 44, 31.3% from 45 to 64, and 14.0% who were 65 years of age or older. The median age was 41.4 years. For every 100 females, the population had 96.6 males. For every 100 females ages 18 and older there were 92.3 males.
