= Phillipsburg School District =

School district in Warren County, New Jersey, US

Address
- 445 Marshall Street Phillipsburg, Warren County, New Jersey, 08865; United States
- Coordinates: 40.69609°N 75.179951°W

District information
- Grades: PreK-12
- Superintendent: Gregory Troxell
- Business administrator: Staci Horne
- Schools: 5
- Affiliation: Former Abbott district

Students and staff
- Enrollment: 3,989 (as of 2022–23)
- Faculty: 354.5 FTEs
- Student–teacher ratio: 11.3:1

Other information
- District Factor Group: B
- Website: www.pburgsd.net
Ind.	Per pupil	District spending	Rank (*)	K-12 average	%± vs. average
1A	Total Spending	$20,436	77	$18,891	8.2%
1	Budgetary Cost	16,436	84	14,783	11.2%
2	Classroom Instruction	9,980	90	8,763	13.9%
6	Support Services	2,586	76	2,392	8.1%
8	Administrative Cost	1,671	85	1,485	12.5%
10	Operations & Maintenance	1,822	69	1,783	2.2%
13	Extracurricular Activities	350	90	268	30.6%
16	Median Teacher Salary	68,561	74	64,043
Data from NJDoE 2014 Taxpayers' Guide to Education Spending. *Of K-12 districts with more than 3,500 students. Lowest spending=1; Highest=103

The Phillipsburg School District is a comprehensive public school district in Phillipsburg, in Warren County, in the U.S. state of New Jersey. The district serves students in pre-kindergarten through twelfth grade from a population of 16,000 people and an area of 3.2 square miles (8.3 km^{2}) in Phillipsburg and other neighboring communities along the Delaware River. The district is one of 31 former Abbott districts statewide that were established pursuant to the decision by the New Jersey Supreme Court in Abbott v. Burke which are now referred to as "SDA Districts" based on the requirement for the state to cover all costs for school building and renovation projects in these districts under the supervision of the New Jersey Schools Development Authority.

As of the 2022–23 school year, the district, comprised of five schools, had an enrollment of 3,989 students and 354.5 classroom teachers (on an FTE basis), for a student–teacher ratio of 11.3:1.

The district is classified by the New Jersey Department of Education as being in District Factor Group "B", the second-lowest of eight groupings. District Factor Groups organize districts statewide to allow comparison by common socioeconomic characteristics of the local districts. From lowest socioeconomic status to highest, the categories are A, B, CD, DE, FG, GH, I and J.

The district's high school serves students from the Town of Phillipsburg and from four sending communities at the secondary level: Alpha, Bloomsbury (in Hunterdon County), Greenwich Township, Lopatcong Township and Pohatcong Township, as part of sending/receiving relationships with the respective school districts. However, Bloomsbury terminated their sending/receiving relationship with Phillipsburg as part of their Board of Education's goals to become part of the North Hunterdon-Voorhees Regional High School District.

== Schools ==
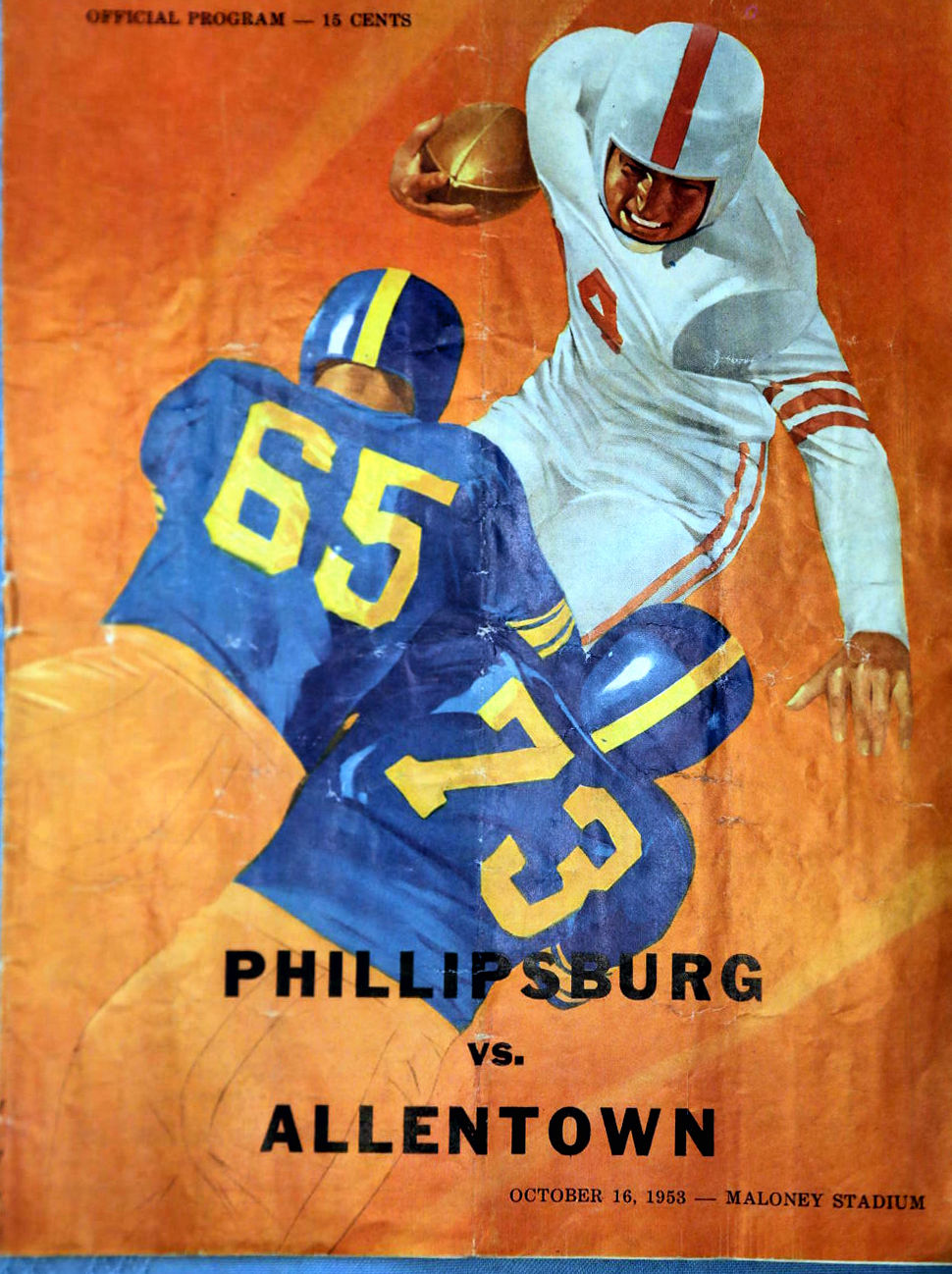
The October 16, 1958 program for Phillipsburg High School football game against Allen High School at J. Birney Crum Stadium in Allentown on October 16, 1958

Schools in the district (with 2022–23 enrollment data from the National Center for Education Statistics) are:

Early childhood

- Early Childhood Learning Center with 446 students in grades PreK-K
  - Natalie Steckel, principal

Elementary schools

- Phillipsburg Primary School with 397 students in grades 1-2
  - Raffaele LaForgia, principal
- Phillipsburg Elementary School with 595 students in grades 3-5
  - Darlene M. Noel, principal

Middle school

- Phillipsburg Middle School with 664 students in grades 6-8
  - Raffaele LaForgia, principal

High schools

- Phillipsburg High School with 1,794 students in grades 9-12. The Phillipsburg High School Stateliners have an athletic rivalry with neighboring Easton, Pennsylvania's Easton Area High School, which celebrated its 100th anniversary game on Thanksgiving Day 2006. The teams from the 1993 Easton-Phillipsburg game, which ended in a 7–7 tie, faced off again in 2009 in the Gatorade Replay series to resolve the game, with more than 13,000 fans watching as Phillipsburg won by a score of 27–12.
  - Kyle Rovi, principal

== Administration ==
Core members of the district's administration are:

- Gregory Troxell, superintendent
- Staci Horne, business administrator and board secretary

== Board of education ==
The district's board of education, comprised of nine members, sets policy and oversees the fiscal and educational operation of the district through its administration. As a Type II school district, the board's trustees are elected directly by voters to serve three-year terms of office on a staggered basis, with three seats up for election each year held (since 2012) as part of the November general election. The board appoints a superintendent to oversee the district's day-to-day operations and a business administrator to supervise the business functions of the district. Greenwich, Lopatcong and Pohatcong townships each have an appointed representative serving on the school board.
