= Phillipsburg, New Jersey =

Town in Warren County, New Jersey, US

- Town
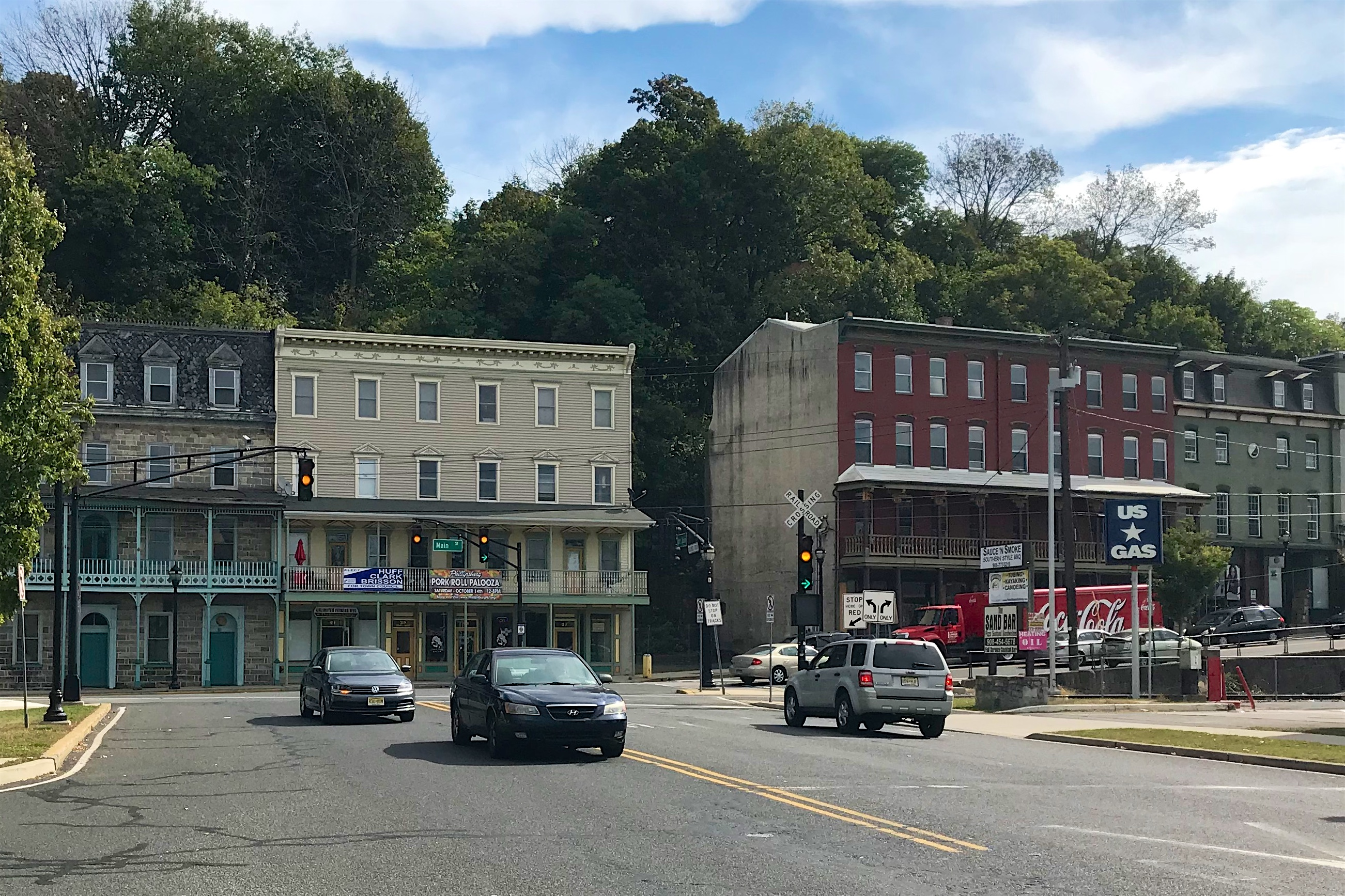
- Union Square (October 2017)

- Seal

- Location of Phillipsburg in Warren County highlighted in red (right). Inset map: Location of Warren County in New Jersey highlighted in orange (left).

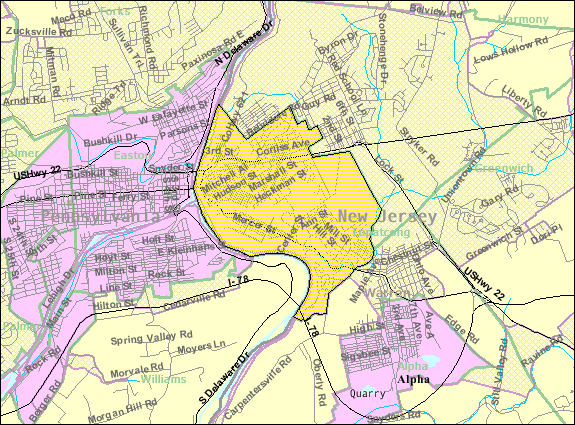
- Census Bureau map of Phillipsburg, New Jersey Interactive map of Phillipsburg, New Jersey

- Location in Warren County Location in New Jersey Location in the United States
- Coordinates: 40.691974°N 75.179006°W
- Country: United States
- State: New Jersey
- County: Warren
- Incorporated: March 8, 1861
- Named for: William Phillips

Government
  - Type: Faulkner Act (mayor–council)
  - Body: Town Council
  - Mayor: Randy Piazza Jr. (R, term ends December 31, 2027)
  - Administrator: Craig Brotons
  - Municipal clerk: Susan Turner (acting)

Area
  - Total: 3.31 sq mi (8.58 km^{2})
  - Land: 3.19 sq mi (8.26 km^{2})
  - Water: 0.12 sq mi (0.31 km^{2}) 3.66%
  - Rank: 324th of 565 in state 19th of 22 in county
- Elevation: 299 ft (91 m)

Population (2020)
  - Total: 15,249
  - Estimate (2023): 15,328
  - Rank: 171st of 565 in state 1st of 22 in county
  - Density: 4,778.8/sq mi (1,845.1/km^{2})
  - Rank: 121st of 565 in state 1st of 22 in county
- Time zone: UTC−05:00 (Eastern (EST))
  - Summer (DST): UTC−04:00 (Eastern (EDT))
- ZIP Code: 08865
- Area code: 908 exchanges: 213, 387, 454, 859, 995
- FIPS code: 3404158350
- GNIS feature ID: 0885350
- School district: Phillipsburg School District
- Website: www.phillipsburgnj.org

Phillipsburg is a town located along the Delaware River that is the most populous municipality in Warren County, in the U.S. state of New Jersey. It is part of the Allentown-Bethlehem-Easton, PA-NJ metropolitan statistical area. As of the 2020 United States census, the town's population was 15,249, an increase of 299 (+2.0%) from the 2010 census count of 14,950, which in turn reflected a decline of 216 (−1.4%) from the 15,166 counted in the 2000 census.

The Norfolk Southern Railway's Lehigh Line, formerly the mainline of the Lehigh Valley Railroad with a mix of mainline trackage combined long leased to the Central Railroad of New Jersey by its builder Lehigh Coal & Navigation Company, runs through Phillipsburg and then across the Delaware River into Easton, Pennsylvania. The Belvidere Delaware Railroad was leased in 1871 and later acquired by the Pennsylvania Railroad, connecting the lower Poconos to Trenton, New Jersey, and Philadelphia.

Phillipsburg is located 19.3 miles (31.1 km) northeast of Allentown, 78.9 miles (127.0 km) north of Philadelphia, and 70.1 miles (112.8 km) west of New York City.

== History ==
The town grew from an agricultural village in 1824. It was transformed into a transportation hub and shipping center as the Delaware River terminus of the Morris Canal, with operations commencing in 1831, the first of several transportation infrastructure projects that gave the community a direct connection 107 miles (172 km) to New York City. The Central Railroad of New Jersey soon followed with a connection. The community's growth soon reached the canal terminals of both the Delaware Canal and the Lehigh Canal by its cross-river cable ferry system to Easton, Pennsylvania. In 1853, the Lehigh Valley Railroad connected across the river with the Central Railroad of New Jersey and a passenger short line railroad, the Belvidere Delaware Railroad, and Morris Canal, all within Phillipsburg, which was followed by rapid growth.

On March 8, 1861, Phillipsburg was incorporated as a town by an act of the New Jersey Legislature from portions of Phillipsburg Township, which is now Lopatcong Township. The town was named for William Phillips, an early settler of the area.

== Geography ==
According to the U.S. Census Bureau, the town had a total area of 3.31 square miles (8.58 km^{2}), including 3.19 square miles (8.26 km^{2}) of land and 0.12 square miles (0.31 km^{2}) of water (3.66%).

Unincorporated communities, localities and place names located partially or completely within the town include Andover Furnace, Delaware Park, Lopatcong Heights, Shirmers and Warren Heights.

Pohatcong Mountain is a ridge, approximately 6 miles (9.7 km) long, in the Appalachian Mountains that extends from Phillipsburg northeast approximately to Washington.

Phillipsburg borders the municipalities of Lopatcong Township and Pohatcong Township in Warren County; and both Easton, Pennsylvania, and Williams Township across the Delaware River in Northampton County, Pennsylvania.

=== Climate ===
According to the Köppen Climate Classification system, Phillipsburg has a humid subtropical climate, abbreviated "Cfa" on climate maps. The hottest temperature recorded in Phillipsburg was 105 °F (40.6 °C) on July 22, 1926, while the coldest temperature recorded was −15 °F (−26.1 °C) on January 22, 1961.

Climate data for Phillipsburg, New Jersey, 1991–2020 normals, extremes 1903–1977, 1993–present (Note: PHILLIPSBURG 1903–1977, PHILLIPSBURG-EASTON BRIDGE 1993–PRESENT)
Month	Jan	Feb	Mar	Apr	May	Jun	Jul	Aug	Sep	Oct	Nov	Dec	Year
Record high °F (°C)	71 (22)	80 (27)	87 (31)	95 (35)	99 (37)	101 (38)	105 (41)	104 (40)	103 (39)	92 (33)	84 (29)	74 (23)	105 (41)
Mean daily maximum °F (°C)	37.7 (3.2)	40.4 (4.7)	48.8 (9.3)	62.3 (16.8)	71.8 (22.1)	80.9 (27.2)	85.6 (29.8)	82.5 (28.1)	76.8 (24.9)	64.8 (18.2)	53.4 (11.9)	42.5 (5.8)	62.3 (16.8)
Daily mean °F (°C)	29.6 (−1.3)	31.3 (−0.4)	39.1 (3.9)	50.9 (10.5)	60.6 (15.9)	70.0 (21.1)	74.7 (23.7)	72.3 (22.4)	65.7 (18.7)	54.1 (12.3)	43.0 (6.1)	34.2 (1.2)	52.1 (11.2)
Mean daily minimum °F (°C)	21.5 (−5.8)	22.1 (−5.5)	29.3 (−1.5)	39.4 (4.1)	49.4 (9.7)	59.0 (15.0)	63.7 (17.6)	62.0 (16.7)	54.5 (12.5)	43.5 (6.4)	32.5 (0.3)	25.9 (−3.4)	41.9 (5.5)
Record low °F (°C)	−15 (−26)	−11 (−24)	1 (−17)	12 (−11)	24 (−4)	39 (4)	40 (4)	41 (5)	30 (−1)	18 (−8)	5 (−15)	−12 (−24)	−15 (−26)
Average precipitation inches (mm)	3.67 (93)	2.97 (75)	3.65 (93)	3.94 (100)	4.27 (108)	4.82 (122)	5.57 (141)	5.18 (132)	4.72 (120)	4.48 (114)	3.37 (86)	4.37 (111)	51.01 (1,295)
Source 1: NOAA
Source 2: xmACIS2

== Demographics ==
Historical population
Census	Pop.	Note	%±
1870	5,932		—
1880	7,181		21.1%
1890	8,644		20.4%
1900	10,052		16.3%
1910	13,903		38.3%
1920	16,923		21.7%
1930	19,255		13.8%
1940	18,314		−4.9%
1950	18,919		3.3%
1960	18,502		−2.2%
1970	17,849		−3.5%
1980	16,647		−6.7%
1990	15,757		−5.3%
2000	15,166		−3.8%
2010	14,950		−1.4%
2020	15,249		2.0%
2023 (est.)	15,328	▲	0.5%
Population sources: 1870–1920 1870; 1880–1890 1890–1910; 1910–1930 1940–2000; 2000 2010 2020

The town's economic data (as is all of Warren County) is calculated by the United States Census Bureau as part of the Allentown-Bethlehem-Easton, PA-NJ Metropolitan Statistical Area.

=== 2020 census ===
As of the 2020 census, Phillipsburg had a population of 15,249. The median age was 37.8 years. 25.1% of residents were under the age of 18 and 14.5% of residents were 65 years of age or older. For every 100 females there were 93.3 males, and for every 100 females age 18 and over there were 89.7 males age 18 and over.

100.0% of residents lived in urban areas, while 0.0% lived in rural areas.

There were 6,024 households in Phillipsburg, of which 32.9% had children under the age of 18 living in them. Of all households, 35.4% were married-couple households, 20.4% were households with a male householder and no spouse or partner present, and 34.9% were households with a female householder and no spouse or partner present. About 31.4% of all households were made up of individuals and 11.4% had someone living alone who was 65 years of age or older.

There were 6,659 housing units, of which 9.5% were vacant. The homeowner vacancy rate was 4.0% and the rental vacancy rate was 7.7%.

Racial composition as of the 2020 census
Race	Number	Percent
White	10,253	67.2%
Black or African American	2,035	13.3%
American Indian and Alaska Native	24	0.2%
Asian	223	1.5%
Native Hawaiian and Other Pacific Islander	6	0.0%
Some other race	1,102	7.2%
Two or more races	1,606	10.5%
Hispanic or Latino (of any race)	2,552	16.7%

=== 2010 census ===
The 2010 United States census counted 14,950 people, 5,925 households, and 3,786 families in the town. The population density was 4,682.1 per square mile (1,807.8/km^{2}). There were 6,607 housing units at an average density of 2,069.2 per square mile (798.9/km^{2}). The racial makeup was 83.44% (12,475) White, 7.49% (1,120) Black or African American, 0.17% (26) Native American, 1.53% (228) Asian, 0.05% (8) Pacific Islander, 3.92% (586) from other races, and 3.39% (507) from two or more races. Hispanic or Latino people of any race were 11.82% (1,767) of the population.

Of the 5,925 households, 30.7% had children under the age of 18; 39.0% were married couples living together; 19.0% had a female householder with no husband present and 36.1% were non-families. Of all households, 29.9% were made up of individuals and 12.2% had someone living alone who was 65 years of age or older. The average household size was 2.51 and the average family size was 3.12.

25.8% of the population were under the age of 18, 9.3% from 18 to 24, 25.9% from 25 to 44, 25.8% from 45 to 64, and 13.2% who were 65 years of age or older. The median age was 37.1 years. For every 100 females, the population had 92.7 males. For every 100 females ages 18 and older there were 87.0 males.

=== Income and poverty ===
The Census Bureau's 2006–2010 American Community Survey showed that (in 2010 inflation-adjusted dollars) median household income was $42,825 (with a margin of error of +/− $3,386) and the median family income was $51,334 (+/− $3,243). Males had a median income of $44,311 (+/− $2,090) versus $37,673 (+/− $6,847) for females. The per capita income for the borough was $21,291 (+/− $1,061). About 16.5% of families and 18.5% of the population were below the poverty line, including 31.1% of those under age 18 and 6.5% of those age 65 or over.

== Economy ==
=== Industrial history ===
Phillipsburg historically benefited from being a major transportation hub, then manufacturing with the investments by Ingersoll Rand in 1903 by opening the first Ingersoll-Sergeant factory in Phillipsburg. Within a year it employed 1,000 people, reaching a peak of 5,000. The town is situated at the confluence of the Delaware and Lehigh rivers. Phillipsburg served as the western terminus of the Morris Canal for approximately 100 years from the 1830s to 1920s, which connected the city by water to the industrial and consumer centers of the New York City area, with connections westward via the Lehigh Canal and Delaware Canal across the Delaware. Long gone is the era of canal shipping and many of the important freight railways that served the area have gone bankrupt or bypass the city on long-distance routes.

Phillipsburg was served by five major railroads:

- Central Railroad of New Jersey (CNJ)
- Lehigh and Hudson River Railway (L&HR)
- Lehigh Valley Railroad (LVRR)
- Delaware, Lackawanna and Western Phillipsburg Branch (DL&W)
- Pennsylvania Railroad Belvidere Division (PRR)

=== Economic revival ===
A majority of the manufacturing jobs left Warren County's largest city once Ingersoll Rand closed operations in 2000.

Portions of the town are part of an Urban Enterprise Zone (UEZ), one of 32 zones covering 37 municipalities statewide. The city was selected in 1994 as one of a group of 10 zones added to participate in the program. In addition to other benefits to encourage employment within the UEZ, shoppers can take advantage of a reduced 3.3125% sales tax rate (half of the 6 5/8% rate charged statewide) at eligible merchants. Established in November 1994, the town's Urban Enterprise Zone status expires in October 2025.

Businesses have begun to move on to South Main Street, including the opening of the Apothecarium Dispensary – Phillipsburg in November 2019 selling marijuana, the Town Council voted in June 2021 to adopt an ordinance preventing the opening of any other cannabis retailers.

=== Railway ===
A tourist railroad known as the Belvidere & Delaware River Railroad operates on the former Belvidere-Delaware Railroad Pennsylvania Railroad Branch serving excursions from Lehigh Junction Station south to Carpentersville. Norfolk Southern serves the industrial manufacturing purposes in Phillipsburg using former LVRR tracks and the L&HR bridge to connect with the Bel-Del PRR tracks.

Since 2007, NJ Transit has been conducting a study to determine if re-establishing a commuter rail extension of the Raritan Valley Line to Phillipsburg is economically feasible.

Phillipsburg also is home to the Phillipsburg Railroad Historians museum. They display railroad memorabilia inside the museum, an "N" scale diorama, two Lehigh and Hudson River cabooses, one of which is currently being restored, and a Jersey Central caboose. There is an L&HR snow flanger, Tidewater tank car, a CNJ box car owned by the Anthracite Railroads Historical Society, a 1922 Chestnut Ridge Mack railbus owned by the Lehigh Valley NRHS, a Public Service trolley owned by the North Jersey Electric Railway Historical Society, a 44-ton GE locomotive and a 25-ton GE locomotive. They operate a miniature railroad, the Centerville & Southwestern, that formerly ran in Roseland, New Jersey.

== Government ==
=== Local government ===
Phillipsburg is governed under the Mayor-Council system of municipal government within the Faulkner Act, formally known as the Optional Municipal Charter Law. The town is one of 71 municipalities (of the 564) statewide that use this form of government. The governing body is comprised of the Mayor and the five-member Town Council. Councilmembers are elected at-large in partisan elections to four-year terms of office on a staggered basis, with either three seats or two seats and the mayoral seat up for election in odd-numbered years as part of the November general election.

As of 2026, the Mayor of Phillipsburg is Republican Randy Piazza Jr., whose term of office ends December 31, 2027. Members of the Town Council are Council President Keith A. Kennedy (D, 2029), Council Vice President Lee M. Clark (D, 2029), Bernie Fey (D, 2029), Edward Saultz (R, 2027; elected to serve an unexpired term) and Joshua Wanisko (D, 2027; elected to serve an unexpired term).

In 2018, the town had an average property tax bill of $4,387, the lowest in the county, compared to an average bill of $6,982 in Warren County and $8,767 statewide.

==== Selected mayors of Phillipsburg ====
Mayor	Term begins	Term ends	Notes
Charles Sitgreaves	1861	1862	First mayor. Major commandant in the New Jersey State militia. Member of the state general assembly 1831 to 1833. Served in the state senate 1851 to 1854. Served as city councilman from 1834 to 1835.
	1863	1887	
Irwin W. Schultz	1884	1885	Lafayette College alumnus. Local lawyer. Served a single year-long term as mayor and refused to stand for re-election.
	1886	1886	
John H. Griffith	1887	1894	Former city physician. Remained active in fraternal and charitable organizations after being mayor.
Vernon D. Best	1953	1954	
William M. Norton	1954	1958	Local self-made millionaire of the Norton Oil Co. Testified to Congress about the creation of new toll highways as a source of local revenue in 1956.
Arthur Paini	1958	1960	Democratic Party. Served on the city commission from 1950 to 1958. Unsuccessfully challenged Decker in the 1992 election.
James A. Bianchi	1979	1980	Served as a city councilman from 1966 to 1972.
	1981	1991Joseph M Blanchfield mayor July 1989 to July 1991	
Gloria Decker	1992	1996	Former leader of the Warren County. Elected mayor as a Democrat, switched party affiliations to Republican in 1994 and lost her re-election bid in 1995.
Thomas W. Corcoran	1996	2000	Democrat. Defeated incumbent Decker. Long-time chairman of the Phillipsburg Democratic Party. Navy veteran from World War II and the Korean War.
Harry Wyant Jr.	2000	2016	Republican. Served on the town council before serving as mayor for 16 years. Despite this lengthy career, he only voted on the town council once, to appoint his replacement. He and his replacement were defeated in 2016.
Stephen Ellis	2016	2020	Democrat. Defeated Wyant in the 2016 election. He graduated from Phillipsburg High School. Undergraduate degree at Slippery Rock University and master's degree from Rutgers University, Edward J. Bloustein School of Planning and Public Policy. He lost his bid for re-election in 2020 to Todd Tersigni.
Todd M. Tersigni	2020	2024	Republican. Graduate of Phillipsburg High School and Seton Hall University. Served two terms on the town council from 2012 to 2020. Lost re-election bid in 2023, running as a Democrat, after losing party support.
Randy Piazza Jr.	2024	Incumbent	Republican

=== Federal, state and county representation ===
Phillipsburg is located in the 7th Congressional District and is part of New Jersey's 23rd state legislative district.

For the 119th United States Congress, New Jersey's 7th congressional district is represented by Thomas Kean Jr. (R, Westfield). New Jersey is represented in the United States Senate by Democrats Cory Booker (Newark, term ends 2027) and Andy Kim (Moorestown, term ends 2031).

For the 2026–2027 session, the 23rd legislative district of the New Jersey Legislature is represented in the State Senate by Doug Steinhardt (R, Lopatcong Township) and in the General Assembly by John DiMaio (R, Hackettstown) and Erik Peterson (R, Franklin Township).

Warren County is governed by a three-member Board of County Commissioners, who are chosen at-large on a staggered basis in partisan elections with one seat coming up for election each year as part of the November general election. At an annual reorganization meeting held in the beginning of January, the board selects one of its members to serve as Commissioner Director and other as Deputy Director. As of 2025, Warren County's Commissioners are:

Deputy Director Jason J. Sarnoski (R, Lopatcong Township; 2025), Lori Ciesla (R, Lopatcong Township; 2026), and Director James R. Kern III (R, Pohatcong Township; 2027).

Constitutional officers of Warren County are: Clerk Holly Mackey (R, Alpha; 2027), Sheriff James McDonald Sr. (R, Phillipsburg; 2025) and Surrogate Michael J. Doherty (R, Washington; 2025).

=== Politics ===
As of March 2011, there were a total of 7,681 registered voters in Phillipsburg, of which 2,496 (32.5% vs. 21.5% countywide) were registered as Democrats, 1,510 (19.7% vs. 35.3%) were registered as Republicans and 3,665 (47.7% vs. 43.1%) were registered as Unaffiliated. There were 10 voters registered as Libertarians or Greens. Among the town's 2010 Census population, 51.4% (vs. 62.3% in Warren County) were registered to vote, including 69.2% of those ages 18 and over (vs. 81.5% countywide).

Gubernatorial election results for Phillipsburg
Year	Republican		Democratic		Third party(ies)	
Year	No.	%	No.	%	No.	%
2025	1,717	44.24%	2,122	54.68%	42	1.08%
2021	1,638	51.64%	1,489	46.94%	45	1.42%
2017	1,321	47.52%	1,337	48.09%	122	4.39%
2013	1,667	63.77%	879	33.63%	68	2.60%
2009	1,321	45.21%	1,159	39.66%	442	15.13%
2005	1,166	38.63%	1,682	55.73%	170	5.63%

In the 2012 presidential election, Democrat Barack Obama received 2,487 votes (56.6% vs. 40.8% countywide), ahead of Republican Mitt Romney with 1,751 votes (39.8% vs. 56.0%) and other candidates with 88 votes (2.0% vs. 1.7%), among the 4,394 ballots cast by the town's 7,730 registered voters, for a turnout of 56.8% (vs. 66.7% in Warren County). In the 2008 presidential election, Democrat Barack Obama received 2,673 votes (54.8% vs. 41.4% countywide), ahead of Republican John McCain with 1,983 votes (40.6% vs. 55.2%) and other candidates with 116 votes (2.4% vs. 1.6%), among the 4,879 ballots cast by the town's 7,636 registered voters, for a turnout of 63.9% (vs. 73.4% in Warren County). In the 2004 presidential election, Democrat John Kerry received 2,412 votes (49.8% vs. 37.2% countywide), ahead of Republican George W. Bush with 2,324 votes (48.0% vs. 61.0%) and other candidates with 66 votes (1.4% vs. 1.3%), among the 4,842 ballots cast by the town's 7,176 registered voters, for a turnout of 67.5% (vs. 76.3% in the whole county).

United States presidential election results for Phillipsburg
Year	Republican		Democratic		Third party(ies)	
Year	No.	%	No.	%	No.	%
2024	2,826	49.81%	2,752	48.51%	95	1.67%
2020	2,781	47.56%	2,948	50.42%	118	2.02%
2016	2,352	49.81%	2,077	43.99%	293	6.20%
2012	1,751	40.48%	2,487	57.49%	88	2.03%
2008	1,983	41.55%	2,673	56.01%	116	2.43%
2004	2,324	48.40%	2,412	50.23%	66	1.37%

In the 2013 gubernatorial election, Republican Chris Christie received 63.8% of the vote (1,667 cast), ahead of Democrat Barbara Buono with 33.6% (879 votes), and other candidates with 2.6% (68 votes), among the 2,694 ballots cast by the town's 7,909 registered voters (80 ballots were spoiled), for a turnout of 34.1%. In the 2009 gubernatorial election, Republican Chris Christie received 1,321 votes (44.1% vs. 61.3% countywide), ahead of Democrat Jon Corzine with 1,159 votes (38.7% vs. 25.7%), Independent Chris Daggett with 365 votes (12.2% vs. 9.8%) and other candidates with 77 votes (2.6% vs. 1.5%), among the 2,994 ballots cast by the town's 7,437 registered voters, yielding a 40.3% turnout (vs. 49.6% in the county).

United States Senate election results for Phillipsburg1
Year	Republican		Democratic		Third party(ies)	
Year	No.	%	No.	%	No.	%
2024	2,541	46.74%	2,727	50.16%	169	3.11%
2018	1,706	46.98%	1,690	46.54%	235	6.47%
2012	1,524	37.77%	2,410	59.73%	101	2.50%
2006	492	51.30%	404	42.13%	63	6.57%

United States Senate election results for Phillipsburg2
Year	Republican		Democratic		Third party(ies)	
Year	No.	%	No.	%	No.	%
2020	2,587	45.12%	2,929	51.09%	217	3.79%
2014	830	43.27%	964	50.26%	124	6.47%
2013	611	49.59%	595	48.30%	26	2.11%
2008	1,895	42.04%	2,489	55.21%	124	2.75%

== Education ==
The Phillipsburg School District serves public school students from pre-kindergarten through twelfth grade The district is one of 31 former Abbott districts statewide that were established pursuant to the decision by the New Jersey Supreme Court in Abbott v. Burke which are now referred to as "SDA districts" based on the requirement for the state to cover all costs for school building and renovation projects in these districts under the supervision of the New Jersey Schools Development Authority.

As of the 2020–21 school year, the district, comprised of five schools, had an enrollment of 3,877 students and 329.0 classroom teachers (on an FTE basis), for a student–teacher ratio of 11.8:1. Schools in the district (with 2020–21 enrollment data from the National Center for Education Statistics) are Early Childhood Learning Center with 354 students in grades Pre-K–K, Phillipsburg Primary School with 391 students in grades 1–2, Phillipsburg Elementary School with 609 students in grades 3–5, Phillipsburg Middle School with 704 students in grades 6–8, and Phillipsburg High School with 1,730 students in grades 9–12.

The Phillipsburg High School Stateliners have a longstanding athletic rivalry with neighboring Easton, Pennsylvania's Easton Area High School, which celebrated its 100th anniversary game on Thanksgiving Day 2006. In 2009, the 1993 teams from the Easton P-Burg Game met again for the Gatorade REPLAY Game to resolve the game, which ended in a 7–7 tie, with more than 13,000 fans watching as Phillipsburg won by a score of 27–12.

The district's high school serves students from the Town of Phillipsburg and five sending communities at the secondary level: Alpha, Bloomsbury (in Hunterdon County), Greenwich Township, Lopatcong Township and Pohatcong Township, as part of sending/receiving relationships with the respective school districts.

Students from the town and all of Warren County are eligible to attend Ridge and Valley Charter School in Frelinghuysen Township (for grades K–8) or Warren County Technical School in Washington borough (for 9–12), with special education services provided by local districts supplemented throughout the county by the Warren County Special Services School District in Oxford Township (for PreK–12).

Private schools include Saints Philip & James School, which was established in 1875 and serves students in pre-kindergarten through eighth grade, operating under the auspices of the Roman Catholic Diocese of Metuchen.

== Transportation ==
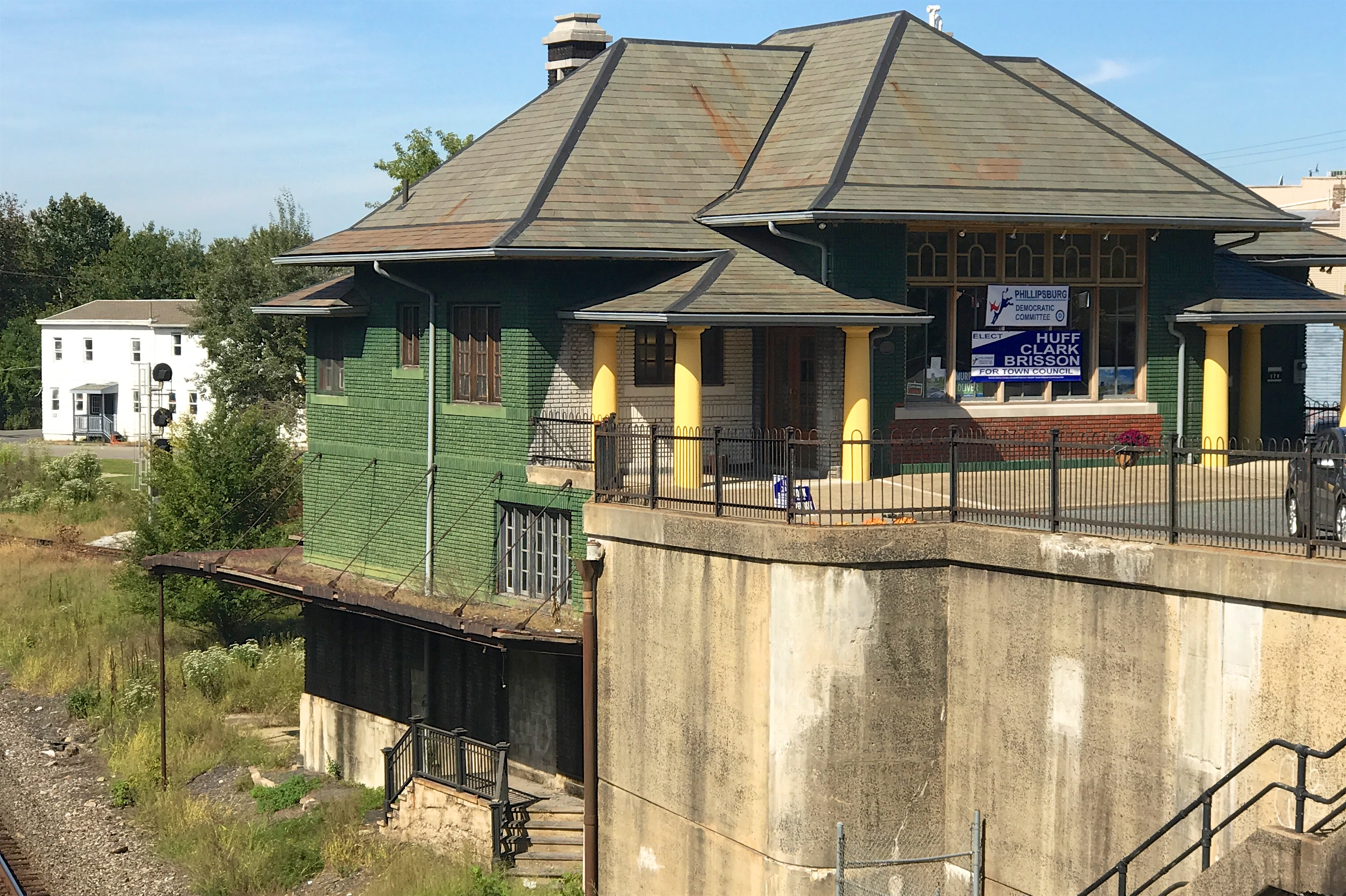
Union Station in Phillipsburg in September 2017

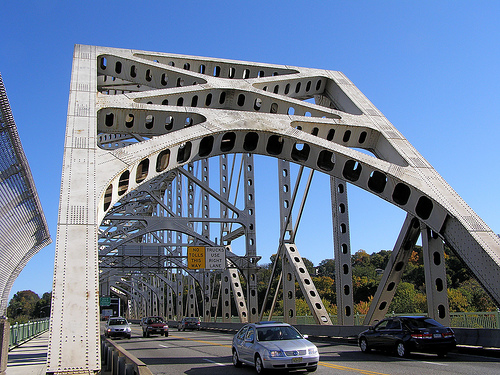
The Easton–Phillipsburg Toll Bridge, connecting Phillipsburg with Easton, Pennsylvania, in October 2009

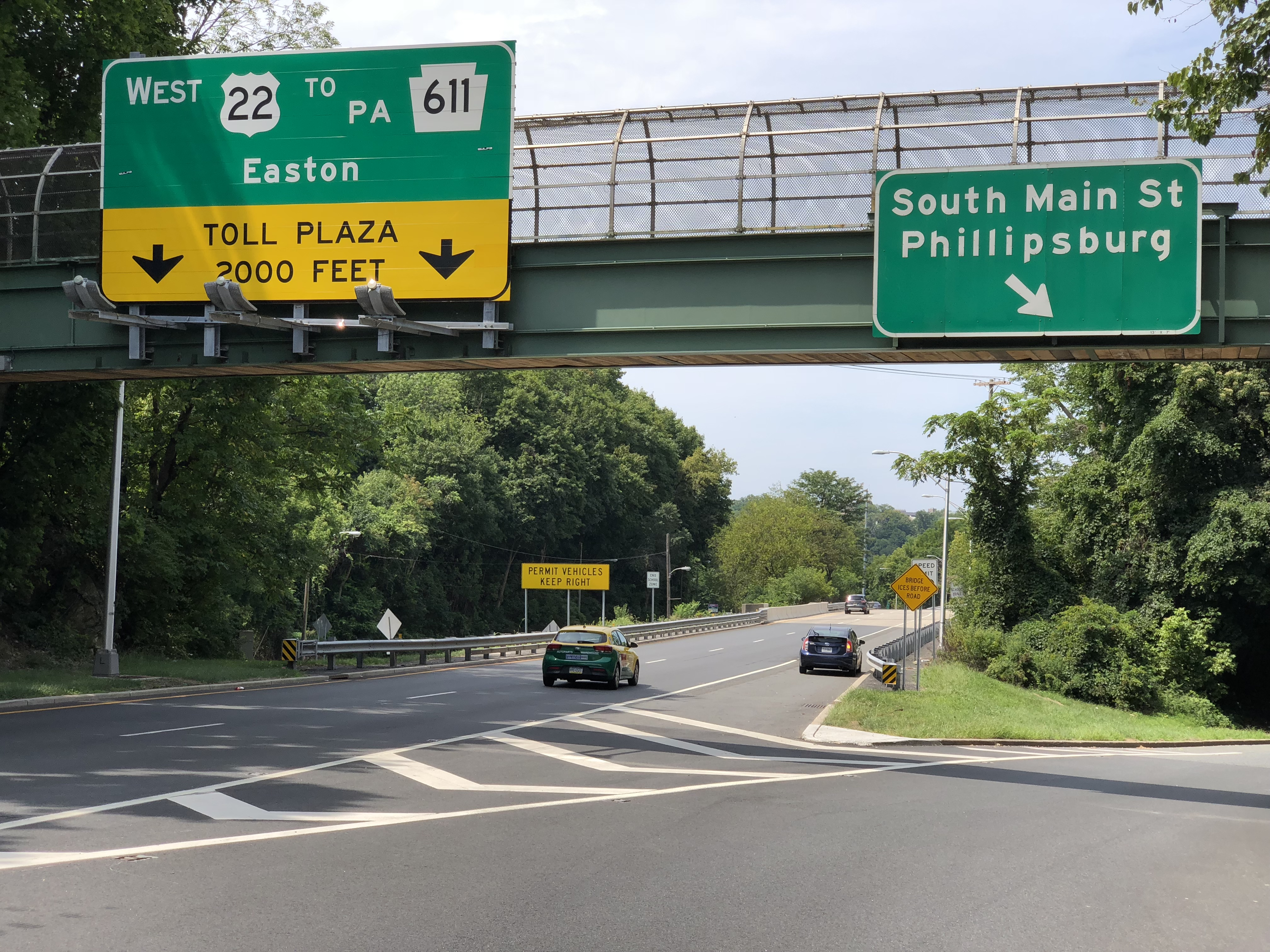
U.S. Route 22 westbound in Phillipsburg in August 2020

=== History ===
Situated at the confluence of the Delaware River and the Lehigh River, Phillipsburg has historically been a major transportation hub. From the 1830s to 1920s, was the western terminus of the Morris Canal, which connected it by water eastward to the Port of New York and New Jersey and westward via the Lehigh Canal across the Delaware River. Five major railroads converged in Phillipsburg, the Central Railroad of New Jersey (CNJ), the DL&W's Morris and Essex Railroad, the Lehigh and Hudson River Railway (L&HR), Lehigh Valley Railroad (LVRR), and the Pennsylvania Railroad's (PRR) Belvidere Delaware Railroad. The CNJ first ran in 1852. Phillipsburg Union Station served CNJ and DL&W.

The CNJ tracks and bridge in Phillipsburg which was part of the CNJ mainline became part of the former Lehigh Valley Railroad mainline, the Lehigh Line now owned by Norfolk Southern Railway, while the PRR line in Phillipsburg is now the Belvidere and Delaware River Railway.

=== Roads and highways ===
As of May 2010, the town had a total of 59.21 miles (95.29 km) of roadways, of which 54.51 miles (87.73 km) were maintained by the municipality, 2.98 miles (4.80 km) by Warren County, 1.18 miles (1.90 km) by the New Jersey Department of Transportation and 0.54 miles (0.87 km) by the Delaware River Joint Toll Bridge Commission.

Major highways that pass through Phillipsburg include U.S. Route 22 and Route 122. Interstate 78 passes through for less than a one-quarter mile (0.40 km) without any exits. The closest interchange is in neighboring Pohatcong.

The town is connected to Pennsylvania across the Delaware River by three bridges: the Easton–Phillipsburg Toll Bridge – (toll bridge carrying U.S. Route 22), the Northampton Street Bridge (the "Free Bridge") and the Interstate 78 Toll Bridge (carrying Interstate 78), all of which are operated by the Delaware River Joint Toll Bridge Commission.

=== Public transportation ===
NJ Transit bus service is provided on the 890 and 891 routes. It is also served by a bus line down Route 57 to Washington Township.

=== Air transportation ===
By air, Phillipsburg is closest to Lehigh Valley International Airport in Allentown, which is roughly 16 miles (26 km) west of Phillipsburg. The larger Newark Liberty International Airport, one of three international airports serving the New York City metropolitan area, is roughly 59 miles (95 km) to the east-northeast.

== Notable people ==
People who were born in, residents of, or otherwise closely associated with Phillipsburg include:

- Walter E. Bachman (1880–1958), college football player and coach
- Charlie Berry (1860–1940), former professional baseball player, Union Association, and father of Charlie Berry
- Charlie Berry (1902–1972), former professional baseball player and umpire, Major League Baseball
- William F. Birch (1870–1946), former Member of Congress
- Ned Bolcar (born 1967), former linebacker who played for the Seattle Seahawks and Miami Dolphins
- Tom Brennan (born 1949), radio and television sportscaster and former men's basketball head coach, most notably for the Vermont Catamounts men's basketball team
- Tim Brewster (born 1960), former coach of the Minnesota Golden Gophers football team
- Harold Curry (1932–2022), lawyer and politician who served in the New Jersey General Assembly
- Ted Dailey (1908–1992), NFL player who played for a single season with the Pittsburgh Pirates football team
- D. C. Drake (born 1957 as Don Drake), former professional wrestler who was National Wrestling Federation World Champion and Heavyweight Champion for Tri-State Wrestling Alliance, later known as Extreme Championship Wrestling (ECW)
- Wayne Dumont (1914–1992), former New Jersey Senate Majority Leader and Senate President
- Fiona (born 1961), rock music singer-songwriter and actress
- James Cullen Ganey (1899–1972), federal judge who served on the United States Court of Appeals for the Third Circuit
- Dan Gray (born 1956), former NFL defensive tackle who played for the Detroit Lions in 1978
- John R. Guthrie (1921–2009), United States Army four-star general
- David Hajdu (born 1955), music critic and author
- Terry Kitchen, folk singer
- Frederick Kroesen (1923–2020), United States Army officer
- J. Robert Lennon (born 1970), novelist
- Hilda Madsen (1910–1981), British-American artist and dog breeder
- Jayne Mansfield (1933–1967), 1950s-era actress
- Brandon Scott Mason (born 1986), journalist and former American football player
- Martin O. May (1922–1945), Medal of Honor recipient in World War II for his actions on Okinawa
- Olivia Miles (born 2003), college basketball player for the Notre Dame Fighting Irish women's basketball team
- Helen Stevenson Meyner (1929–1997), politician who served in Congress from 1975 to 1979
- Robert B. Meyner (1908–1990), governor of New Jersey 1954–1962
- Charles E. Myers (1925–2016), Director for Air Warfare in the Office of the Secretary of Defense (1973–1978), Aviation Pioneer and an early member of the "Fighter Mafia" inside the Pentagon
- Lou Reda (born c. 1925–2017), documentary filmmaker
- Jim Ringo (1931–2007), professional football player who played in the NFL for the Green Bay Packers and Philadelphia Eagles
- Sheetal Sheth (born 1976), actress
- Charles Sitgreaves (1803–1878), politician who was a Member of Congress and mayor of Phillipsburg
- Matthew Tirrell (born 1950), chemical engineer
- Bill Walsh (1927–2012), center who played in the NFL for the Pittsburgh Steelers
- Christina Wilson (born 1979), chef and reality television personality who was the winner of season 10 of the reality cooking show Hell's Kitchen
- Yvonne Zima (born 1989), actress who appeared on NBC's ER
