= Lopatcong Township, New Jersey =

Township in Warren County, New Jersey, US

- Township
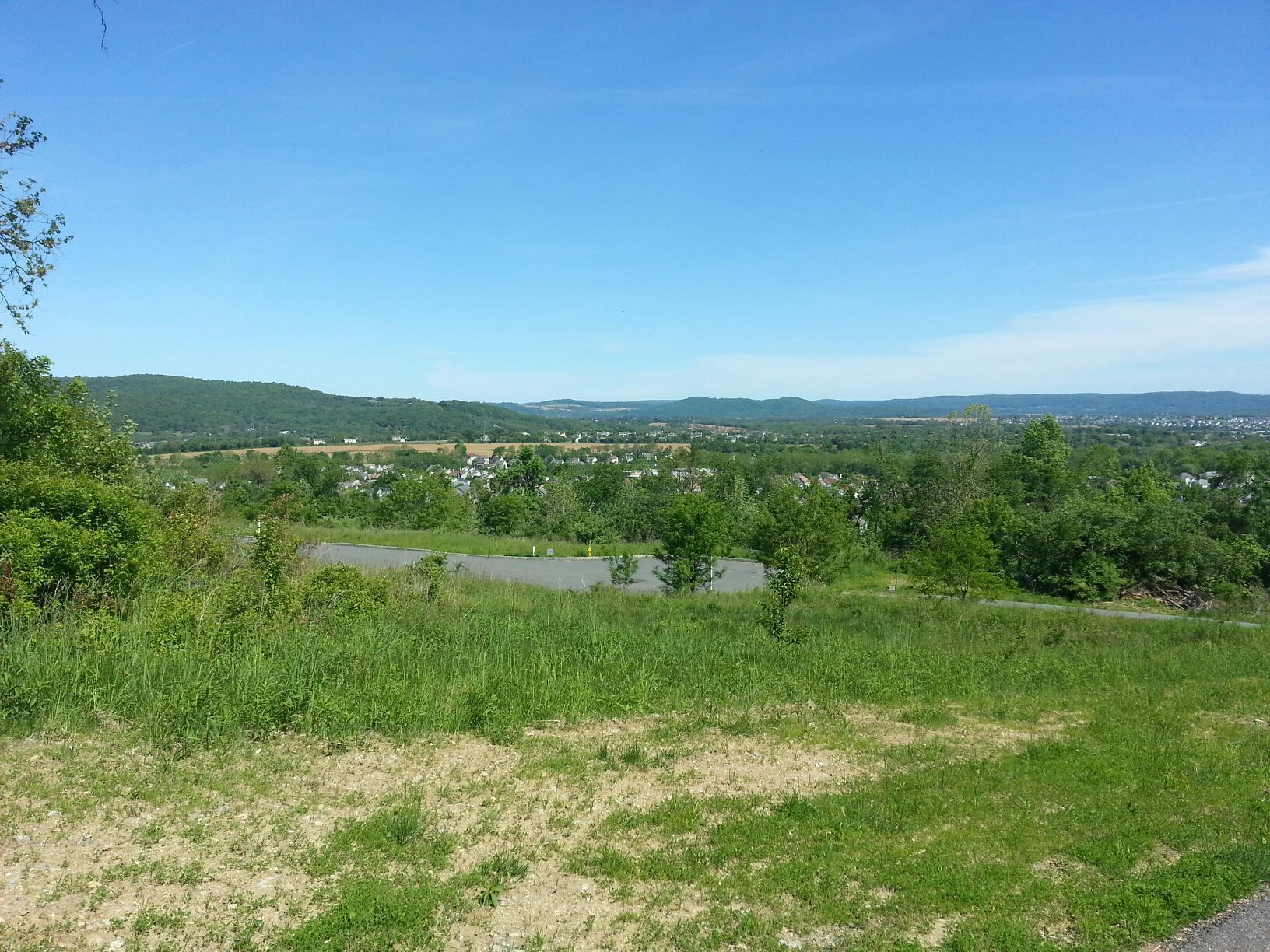
- Lopatcong Township seen from the base of Marble Mountain

- Seal

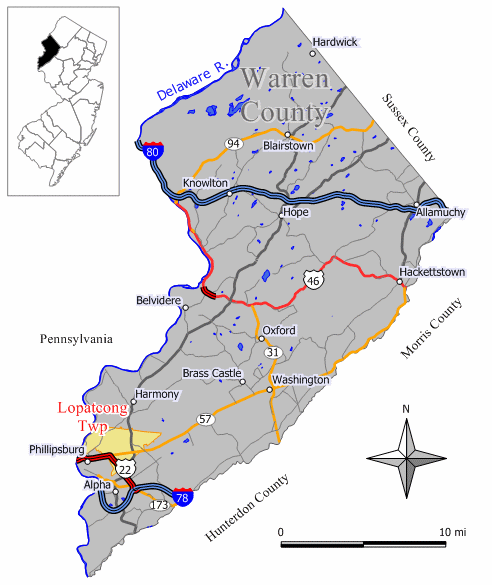
- Location of Lopatcong Township in Warren County highlighted in yellow (right). Inset map: Location of Warren County in New Jersey highlighted in black (left).

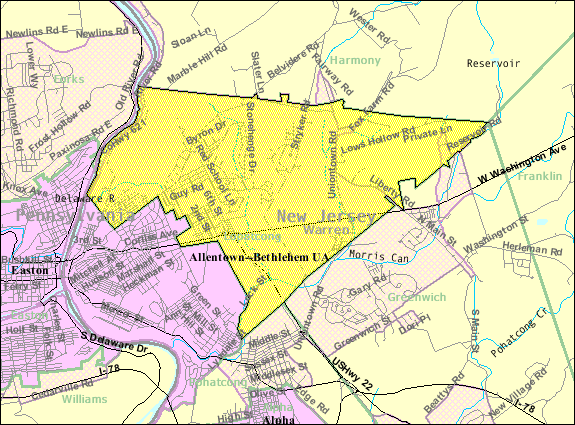
- Census Bureau map of Lopatcong Township, New Jersey

- Location in Warren County Location in New Jersey Location in the United States
- Coordinates: 40.714002°N 75.15547°W
- Country: United States
- State: New Jersey
- County: Warren
- Incorporated: March 7, 1851

Government
  - Type: Faulkner Act (small municipality)
  - Body: Township Council
  - Mayor: James Mengucci (R, term ends December 31, 2023)
  - Administrator / Municipal clerk: M. Beth Dilts

Area
  - Total: 7.37 sq mi (19.10 km^{2})
  - Land: 7.32 sq mi (18.95 km^{2})
  - Water: 0.062 sq mi (0.16 km^{2}) 0.81%
  - Rank: 237th of 565 in state 16th of 22 in county
- Elevation: 384 ft (117 m)

Population (2020)
  - Total: 8,776
  - Estimate (2024): 9,502
  - Rank: 274th of 565 in state 3rd of 22 in county
  - Density: 1,199.6/sq mi (463.2/km^{2})
  - Rank: 362nd of 565 in state 6th of 22 in county
- Time zone: UTC−05:00 (Eastern (EST))
  - Summer (DST): UTC−04:00 (Eastern (EDT))
- ZIP Code: 08865
- Area code: 908
- FIPS code: 3404141490
- GNIS feature ID: 0882252
- School district: Phillipsburg School District
- Website: www.lopatcongtwp.com

Lopatcong Township (/loʊˈpætkɒŋ/) is a township in Warren County, New Jersey, United States. As of the 2020 United States census, the township's population was 8,776, an increase of 762 (+9.5%) from the 2010 census count of 8,014, which in turn reflected an increase of 2,249 (+39.0%) from the 5,765 counted in the 2000 census.

== History ==
What is now Lopatcong Township was created as Phillipsburg Township on March 7, 1851, by an act approved by the New Jersey Legislature from portions of Greenwich Township and Harmony Township. After Phillipsburg was incorporated as an independent municipality on March 8, 1861, the township changed its name to Lopatcong as of March 18, 1863, after the Lopatcong Creek in the area.

The name of the creek and township, Lopatcong, has its origin in four words of the Lenape Native Americans, "Lowan peek achtu onk," which means "winter watering place for deer".

== Geography ==
According to the U.S. Census Bureau, the township had a total area of 7.38 square miles (19.10 km^{2}), including 7.32 square miles (18.95 km^{2}) of land and 0.06 square miles (0.16 km^{2}) of water (0.81%).

Delaware Park (2020 Census population of 739) and Lopatcong Overlook (692) are unincorporated communities and census-designated places (CDPs) located within the township.

The township borders the Warren County municipalities of Greenwich Township, Harmony Township, Phillipsburg and Pohatcong Township.

Lopatcong Township is 21.8 miles (35.1 km) northeast of Allentown and 70.6 miles (113.6 km) west of New York City.

== Demographics ==
Historical population
Census	Pop.	Note	%±
1860	3,741		—
1870	1,150	*	−69.3%
1880	1,591		38.3%
1890	1,738		9.2%
1900	1,982		14.0%
1910	766		−61.4%
1920	1,050		37.1%
1930	1,269		20.9%
1940	1,450		14.3%
1950	1,737		19.8%
1960	2,703		55.6%
1970	3,144		16.3%
1980	4,998		59.0%
1990	5,052		1.1%
2000	5,765		14.1%
2010	8,014		39.0%
2020	8,776		9.5%
2024 (est.)	9,502		8.3%
Population sources: 1860–1920; 1860–1870 1880–1890; 1890–1910 1910–1930 1940–2000; 2000 2010 2020 * = Lost territory in previous decade

The Township's economic data (as is all of Warren County) is calculated by the United States Census Bureau as part of the Allentown-Bethlehem-Easton, PA-NJ Metropolitan Statistical Area.

=== 2010 census ===
The 2010 United States census counted 8,014 people, 3,136 households, and 2,089 families in the township. The population density was 1,129.0 per square mile (435.9/km^{2}). There were 3,420 housing units at an average density of 481.8 per square mile (186.0/km^{2}). The racial makeup was 87.22% (6,990) White, 6.03% (483) Black or African American, 0.14% (11) Native American, 4.18% (335) Asian, 0.01% (1) Pacific Islander, 0.81% (65) from other races, and 1.61% (129) from two or more races. Hispanic or Latino of any race were 5.99% (480) of the population.

Of the 3,136 households, 30.0% had children under the age of 18; 55.7% were married couples living together; 7.9% had a female householder with no husband present and 33.4% were non-families. Of all households, 29.3% were made up of individuals and 13.3% had someone living alone who was 65 years of age or older. The average household size was 2.46 and the average family size was 3.09.

23.1% of the population were under the age of 18, 5.5% from 18 to 24, 25.5% from 25 to 44, 27.8% from 45 to 64, and 18.1% who were 65 years of age or older. The median age was 42.3 years. For every 100 females, the population had 88.3 males. For every 100 females ages 18 and older there were 82.6 males.

The Census Bureau's 2006–2010 American Community Survey showed that (in 2010 inflation-adjusted dollars) median household income was $77,320 (with a margin of error of +/− $4,889) and the median family income was $89,317 (+/− $6,056). Males had a median income of $61,771 (+/− $6,980) versus $49,338 (+/− $4,584) for females. The per capita income for the borough was $33,633 (+/− $2,586). About 0.7% of families and 4.3% of the population were below the poverty line, including 2.0% of those under age 18 and 8.4% of those age 65 or over.

=== 2000 census ===
As of the 2000 United States census, there were 5,765 people, 2,143 households, and 1,523 families residing in the township. The population density was 814.6 inhabitants per square mile (314.5/km^{2}). There were 2,429 housing units at an average density of 343.2 per square mile (132.5/km^{2}). The racial makeup of the township was 96.27% White, 1.13% African American, 0.07% Native American, 1.63% Asian, 0.49% from other races, and 0.42% from two or more races. Hispanic or Latino of any race were 1.99% of the population.

There were 2,143 households, out of which 32.3% had children under the age of 18 living with them, 62.5% were married couples living together, 5.7% had a female householder with no husband present, and 28.9% were non-families. 26.2% of all households were made up of individuals, and 16.6% had someone living alone who was 65 years of age or older. The average household size was 2.55 and the average family size was 3.09.

In the township, the population was spread out, with 24.5% under the age of 18, 4.4% from 18 to 24, 26.7% from 25 to 44, 22.2% from 45 to 64, and 22.2% who were 65 years of age or older. The median age was 41 years. For every 100 females, there were 85.4 males. For every 100 females age 18 and over, there were 79.3 males.

The median income for a household in the township was $50,918, and the median income for a family was $65,545. Males had a median income of $52,540 versus $30,967 for females. The per capita income for the township was $24,333. About 4.7% of families and 6.4% of the population were below the poverty line, including 8.2% of those under age 18 and 9.3% of those age 65 or over.

== Government ==
=== Local government ===
Lopatcong Township is governed by the Small Municipality form of government, which is available under the terms of the Faulkner Act only for those municipalities with a population below 12,000 at the time of adoption. The township is one of 18 municipalities (of the 564) statewide that use this form of government. The governing body is comprised of the Mayor and the four-member Township Council, with all positions elected at-large on a partisan basis as part of the November general election. The Mayor is elected directly by the voters to a three-year term of office. Council members are elected to serve a term of three years on a staggered basis, so that two seats come up for election in the two years that the mayor is not up for election.

As of 2022, members of the Lopatcong Township Council are Mayor James Mengucci (R, term on committee and as mayor ends December 31, 2020), Council President William D. Wright (R, 2022), Louis Belcaro (R, 2024), Richard McQuade (R, 2024) and James Palitto (R, 2022).

In June 2016, the Township Council unanimously selected Yvonne Reitemeyer from a list of three candidates nominated by the Republican municipal committee to fill the seat expiring in December 2016 that became vacant following the resignation of Donna Schneider.

In the November 2012 general election, Lori Ciesla, who ran as part of the independent slate of Responsible Lopatcong Leadership, won election, as did Maureen McCabe who won an unexpired one-year term when she defeated Republican incumbent Andrew Horun who had been appointed earlier in the year to fill the vacant seat of H. Matthew Curry.

=== Federal, state and county representation ===
Lopatcong Township is located in the 7th Congressional District and is part of New Jersey's 23rd state legislative district. Prior to the 2010 Census, Lopatcong Township had been part of the 5th Congressional District, a change made by the New Jersey Redistricting Commission that took effect in January 2013, based on the results of the November 2012 general elections.

For the 119th United States Congress, New Jersey's 7th congressional district is represented by Thomas Kean Jr. (R, Westfield). New Jersey is represented in the United States Senate by Democrats Cory Booker (Newark, term ends 2027) and Andy Kim (Moorestown, term ends 2031).

For the 2026–2027 session, the 23rd legislative district of the New Jersey Legislature is represented in the State Senate by Doug Steinhardt (R, Lopatcong Township) and in the General Assembly by John DiMaio (R, Hackettstown) and Erik Peterson (R, Franklin Township).

Warren County is governed by a three-member Board of County Commissioners, who are chosen at-large on a staggered basis in partisan elections with one seat coming up for election each year as part of the November general election. At an annual reorganization meeting held in the beginning of January, the board selects one of its members to serve as Commissioner Director and other as Deputy Director. As of 2025, Warren County's Commissioners are:

Deputy Director Jason J. Sarnoski (R, Lopatcong Township; 2025), Lori Ciesla (R, Lopatcong Township; 2026), and Director James R. Kern III (R, Pohatcong Township; 2027).

Constitutional officers of Warren County are: Clerk Holly Mackey (R, Alpha; 2027), Sheriff James McDonald Sr. (R, Phillipsburg; 2025) and Surrogate Michael J. Doherty (R, Washington; 2025).

=== Politics ===
As of March 2011, there were a total of 5,153 registered voters in Lopatcong Township, of which 1,391 (27.0% vs. 21.5% countywide) were registered as Democrats, 1,470 (28.5% vs. 35.3%) were registered as Republicans and 2,288 (44.4% vs. 43.1%) were registered as Unaffiliated. There were 4 voters registered as Libertarians or Greens. Among the township's 2010 Census population, 64.3% (vs. 62.3% in Warren County) were registered to vote, including 83.6% of those ages 18 and over (vs. 81.5% countywide).

Gubernatorial election results for Lopatcong Township
Year	Republican		Democratic		Third party(ies)	
Year	No.	%	No.	%	No.	%
2025	2,053	51.92%	1,871	47.32%	30	0.76%
2021	1,748	57.82%	1,244	41.15%	31	1.03%
2017	1,278	57.41%	874	39.26%	74	3.32%
2013	1,615	70.40%	634	27.64%	45	1.96%
2009	1,455	59.53%	726	29.71%	263	10.76%
2005	1,253	54.38%	939	40.76%	112	4.86%

In the 2012 presidential election, Republican Mitt Romney received 1,964 votes (52.8% vs. 56.0% countywide), ahead of Democrat Barack Obama with 1,638 votes (44.0% vs. 40.8%) and other candidates with 51 votes (1.4% vs. 1.7%), among the 3,720 ballots cast by the township's 5,386 registered voters, for a turnout of 69.1% (vs. 66.7% in Warren County). In the 2008 presidential election, Republican John McCain received 1,985 votes (51.9% vs. 55.2% countywide), ahead of Democrat Barack Obama with 1,730 votes (45.2% vs. 41.4%) and other candidates with 46 votes (1.2% vs. 1.6%), among the 3,827 ballots cast by the township's 5,090 registered voters, for a turnout of 75.2% (vs. 73.4% in Warren County). In the 2004 presidential election, Republican George W. Bush received 1,994 votes (57.5% vs. 61.0% countywide), ahead of Democrat John Kerry with 1,419 votes (40.9% vs. 37.2%) and other candidates with 30 votes (0.9% vs. 1.3%), among the 3,467 ballots cast by the township's 4,536 registered voters, for a turnout of 76.4% (vs. 76.3% in the whole county).

United States presidential election results for Lopatcong Township
Year	Republican		Democratic		Third party(ies)	
Year	No.	%	No.	%	No.	%
2024	2,862	54.83%	2,257	43.24%	101	1.93%
2020	2,718	52.93%	2,337	45.51%	80	1.56%
2016	2,248	56.16%	1,600	39.97%	155	3.87%
2012	1,964	53.76%	1,638	44.84%	51	1.40%
2008	1,985	52.78%	1,730	46.00%	46	1.22%
2004	1,994	57.91%	1,419	41.21%	30	0.87%

In the 2013 gubernatorial election, Republican Chris Christie received 70.4% of the vote (1,615 cast), ahead of Democrat Barbara Buono with 27.6% (634 votes), and other candidates with 2.0% (45 votes), among the 2,345 ballots cast by the township's 5,506 registered voters (51 ballots were spoiled), for a turnout of 42.6%. In the 2009 gubernatorial election, Republican Chris Christie received 1,455 votes (58.6% vs. 61.3% countywide), ahead of Democrat Jon Corzine with 736 votes (29.6% vs. 25.7%), Independent Chris Daggett with 228 votes (9.2% vs. 9.8%) and other candidates with 35 votes (1.4% vs. 1.5%), among the 2,484 ballots cast by the township's 4,981 registered voters, yielding a 49.9% turnout (vs. 49.6% in the county).

United States Senate election results for Lopatcong Township1
Year	Republican		Democratic		Third party(ies)	
Year	No.	%	No.	%	No.	%
2024	2,695	53.44%	2,233	44.28%	115	2.28%
2018	1,839	56.26%	1,295	39.61%	135	4.13%
2012	1,826	53.25%	1,543	45.00%	60	1.75%
2006	1,282	54.88%	957	40.97%	97	4.15%

United States Senate election results for Lopatcong Township2
Year	Republican		Democratic		Third party(ies)	
Year	No.	%	No.	%	No.	%
2020	2,675	53.04%	2,260	44.81%	108	2.14%
2014	1,177	55.08%	882	41.27%	78	3.65%
2013	708	58.08%	491	40.28%	20	1.64%
2008	1,995	56.31%	1,497	42.25%	51	1.44%

== Education ==
The Lopatcong Township School District serves public school students in pre-kindergarten through eighth grade. As of the 2021–22 school year, the district, comprised of two schools, had an enrollment of 707 students and 58.0 classroom teachers (on an FTE basis), for a student–teacher ratio of 12.2:1. Schools in the district (with 2021–22 enrollment data from the National Center for Education Statistics) are Lopatcong Elementary School with 350 students in grades PreK-4 and Lopatcong Middle School with 355 students in grades 5–8. Before the middle school opened in 2003, students would attend the elementary school through eighth grade; The middle school was constructed in the wake of increasing enrollment, which climbed more than 50% from just over 500 in 1995 to more than 750 by 2001.

Public school students in ninth through twelfth grades attend Phillipsburg High School in Phillipsburg as part of a sending/receiving relationship with the Phillipsburg School District. The high school also serves students from four other sending communities: Alpha, Bloomsbury (in Hunterdon County), Greenwich Township and Pohatcong Township. The site of the new Phillipsburg High School, which began construction in January 2014, is in Lopatcong's borders. The three-story, 330,000-square-foot (31,000 m^{2}) building, with more than double the floor space of the existing high school and a capacity to accommodate more than 2,100 students, was completed for the 2016–17 school year and was dedicated in September 2016 at ceremonies attended by Governor of New Jersey Chris Christie. As of the 2021–22 school year, the high school had an enrollment of 1,809 students and 133.5 classroom teachers (on an FTE basis), for a student–teacher ratio of 13.6:1.

Students from the township and from all of Warren County are eligible to attend Ridge and Valley Charter School in Frelinghuysen Township (for grades K–8) or Warren County Technical School in Washington borough (for 9–12), with special education services provided by local districts supplemented throughout the county by the Warren County Special Services School District in Oxford Township (for Pre-K–12).

Lopatcong Township was featured in a 2003 article in The New York Times, which addressed problems of public school financing in suburban communities and various strategies that Lopatcong and other such communities were adopting to deal with the problem.

== Transportation ==
=== Roads and highways ===
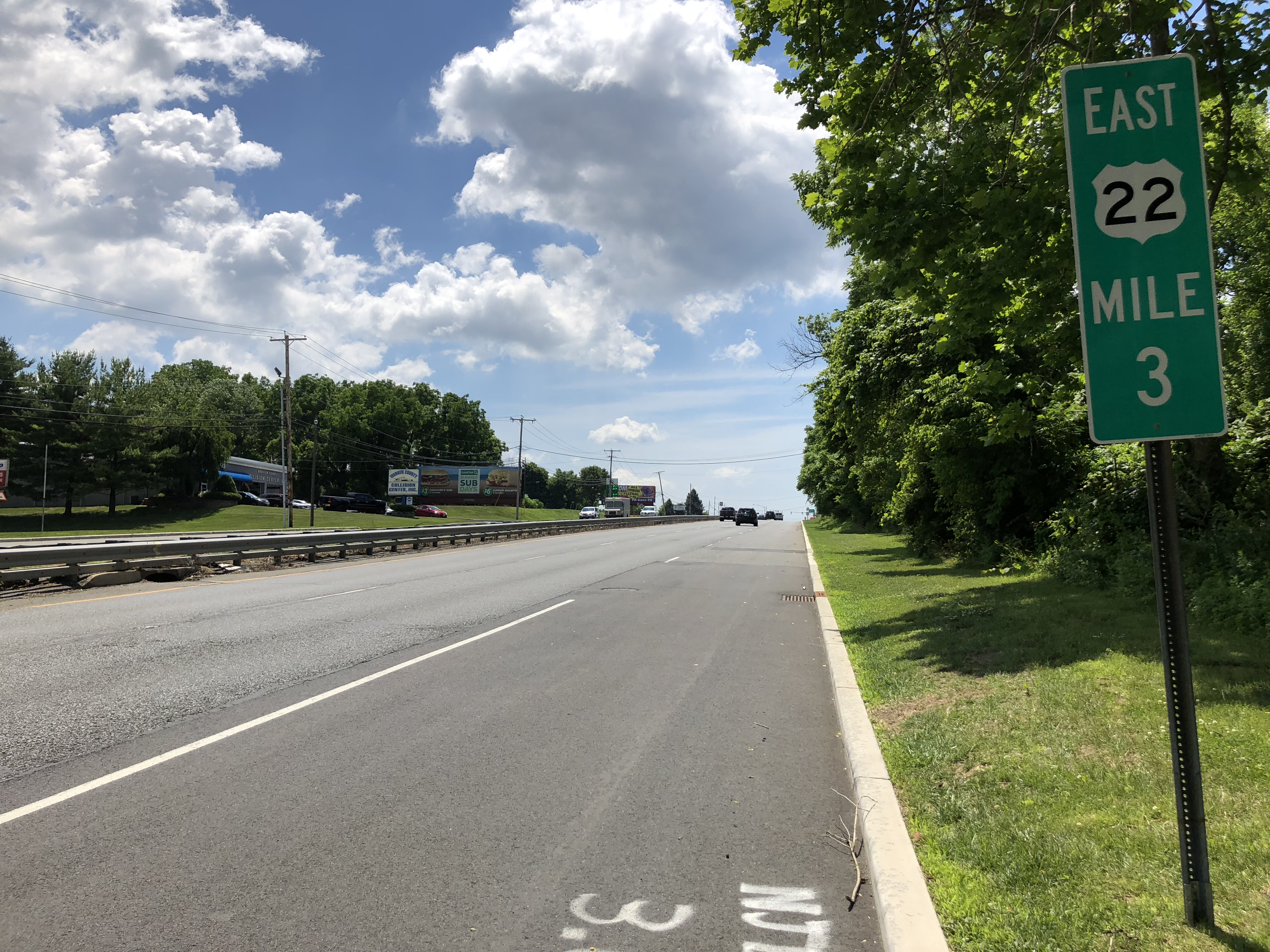
U.S. Route 22 in Lopatcong Township

As of May 2010, the township had a total of 45.59 miles (73.37 km) of roadways, of which 35.19 miles (56.63 km) were maintained by the municipality, 6.56 miles (10.56 km) by Warren County and 3.84 miles (6.18 km) by the New Jersey Department of Transportation.

The most prominent highway in Lopatcong Township is US 22, which traverses the southern section of the township. Route 57 traverses towards the center from its western end at US 22. The main county road that passes through is County Route 519 which passes through in the eastern part of the township.

=== Public transportation ===
NJ Transit bus service is provided on the 890 and 891 routes.

== Notable people ==
People who were born in, residents of, or otherwise closely associated with Lopatcong Township include:

- Donald J. Albanese (born 1937), politician who served in the New Jersey General Assembly from 1976 to 1982
- Ned Bolcar (born 1967), linebacker who played three seasons in the NFL, one with the Seattle Seahawks and two with the Miami Dolphins
- Lou Reda (1925–2017), filmmaker who specialized in television documentaries
- Harold S. Sloan (1888–1988), economist who wrote extensively and taught in the field of economics, who also served as the executive director of the Alfred P. Sloan Foundation
- Doug Steinhardt (born 1968), attorney and politician who served as mayor of Lopatcong Township and is Chairman of the New Jersey Republican State Committee

== Film community ==
Lopatcong Township was the primary location for the independent film Several Ways to Die Trying. The film's writer and director, Glen Tickle, along with members of the cast and crew, are residents of the township.
