= Gatorade Replay =

REPLAY is a program created by Gatorade that restages classic games of various sports between the biggest high school rivalries in the United States. The first official REPLAY game reunited players from the 1993 Easton Area Red Rovers and the Phillipsburg Stateliners to replay a 1993 game that ended in a tie. On April 26, 2009, the Stateliners won the rematch with a 27–12 win.

== First Official REPLAY the Series Game: Easton and Phillipsburg Rivalry ==
Separated by the Delaware River, Easton, Pennsylvania, and Phillipsburg, New Jersey, have had a deep-rooted history in football rivalry since 1906. Since then, every Thanksgiving the teams reunite for the rights to the “Fork of the Delaware” trophy.

In 1993, the two teams played a hard fought game that ended in a 7–7 tie. At the time of the REPLAY game, Easton led the series with a record of 57–40–5.

=== Training ===
Gatorade launched REPLAY in January 2009, bringing together 60 members of the Phillipsburg and Easton teams involved in their 1993 game. The returning players, then 16 years older, came together in a weekend training camp at each school. During this time they began training and practices as well as met with experts from The Gatorade Sports Science Institute (GSSI). Teams also received training from Eagles head coach Andy Reid and all-pro running back, Brian Westbrook at the Eagles’ training facility.

=== Game day ===
The 104th meeting of the two schools took place at Lafayette College’s Fisher Field on April 26, 2009. Led by honorary coaches, Gatorade athletes and NFL quarterbacks, Peyton and Eli Manning, the teams played in unseasonably warm 90-degree weather in front of 15,000 fans. The Phillipsburg Stateliners broke the 16-year-long deadlock, winning 27–12 over the Easton Red Rovers.

== Gatorade REPLAY, Season Two: Trenton and Detroit Catholic Central Rivalry ==
In February 2010, Michigan high school hockey powerhouses and rivals—Detroit Catholic Central Shamrocks and the Trenton Trojans—were announced as the participants in Gatorade REPLAY, season two. The rematch brought together the 1999 teams to replay their game that ended in a 4–4 tie due to a severe injury to one of Trenton’s players.

=== Training ===
Like REPLAY, Season One, the teams were reunited for eight weeks of comprehensive training and nutrition programming developed in partnership with the Gatorade Sports Science Institute and implemented by experts from Velocity Sports Performance – Canton, Mich. Also reunited were original members of each team’s coaching staffs to help prepare for the full-check, regulation length game.

=== Game day ===
The Trenton Trojans and Catholic Central Shamrocks met 11 years later on May 9, 2010, to replay the game at the Compuware Arena in Plymouth, Michigan. Mr. Hockey, Gordie Howe, served as the REPLAY Season 2 game day commissioner while Brendan Shanahan and Scotty Bowman served as honorary coaches. The Trojans defeated the Shamrocks 4–2, bringing closure to the 1999 game between the two teams.

== Gatorade REPLAY, Season Three: Bloom and Brother Rice Rivalry ==
In June 2010, REPLAY Season Three was announced and will feature two South Side Chicago basketball squads as the newest teams to take part in the award-winning program. Bloom and Brother Rice will reunite to settle the score of their 2000 super sectional game in which Bloom won 42–40 despite a controversial ending involving the game clock. The game is tentatively scheduled to take place in early September.

=== Game day ===
The original alumni from the Bloom Township and Brother Rice 2000 boys' basketball teams reunited on September 10, 2010 at St. Xavier University’s Shannon Center in Chicago, Illinois. The teams were joined by NBA all-stars Dwyane Wade who served as Bloom's honorary coach and Dwight Howard as Brother Rice's coach. Carlos Boozer also made an appearance as the official REPLAY game day commissioner. The score was settled once and for all as Brother Rice defeated Bloom by a score of 99–93, more than doubling the original score of the 2000 game.

=== "We Can Do It Now" ===
Chicago natives Common, Jennifer Hudson, Lupe Fiasco and No I.D. joined forces to create the song "We Can Do It Now" inspired by Season 3 of REPLAY which was featured in the documentary which premiered on FOX Sports Net on November 7, 2010.

== Fox Sports Net ==
In 2009, Fox Sports Net (FSN) partnered with Gatorade to telecast REPLAY, which originated as a series of online web episodes. Seasons 2 and 3 aired nationally on FSN.
