= Watsessing =

Watsessing may refer to the following in the U.S. state of New Jersey:

- Watsessing, New Jersey, a neighborhood and census-designated place in Bloomfield, Essex County
  - Watsessing Park
  - The Second River (New Jersey), or the Watsessing River, a tributary of the Passaic River
  - Watsessing Avenue station, a New Jersey Transit rail station
