= Edgemont Memorial Park =

Municipal park in Montclair, New Jersey

Edgemont Park
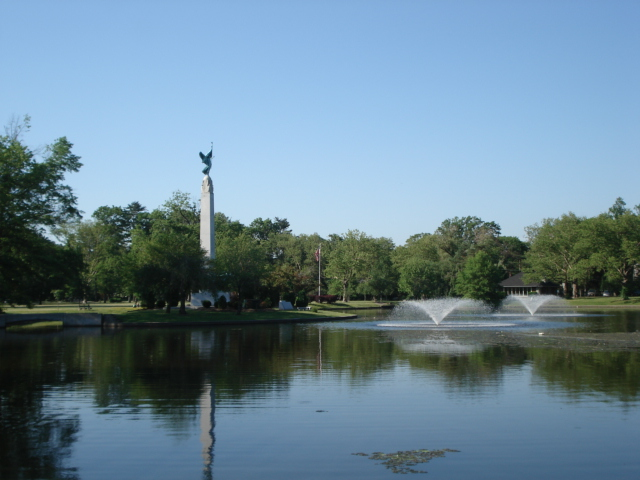
- The Memorial Obelisk seen from across the pond
- Interactive map of Edgemont Park
- Type: Public Park
- Location: Montclair, New Jersey
- Coordinates: 40.8268°N 74.200115°W
- Area: 15.52 acres (62,800 m^{2})
- Operator: Montclair Department of Parks and Recreation
- Open: All year.

Edgemont Park is a park in Montclair, New Jersey, in the United States of America. It shares a name with the nearby Edgemont Elementary School.

== History ==
A committee for park construction in 1906 decided to purchase the land for the park with a $100,000 bond issue, following a town referendum. The effort to buy the land was led by William B. Dickson, who backed a quarter of the bonds issued. The land which comprised the park was originally a golf course, built 10 years prior to the park's founding. Edgemont was originally named the Harrison Tract park. The memorial was dedicated in 1925. The park can also be seen about 20 minutes into the movie To Wong Foo, Thanks For Everything, Julie Newmar, being referenced as the location where Vida was asked to “stop imitating Esther Williams in Million Dollar Mermaid” in her hometown of Bala Cynwyd.

== Overview ==
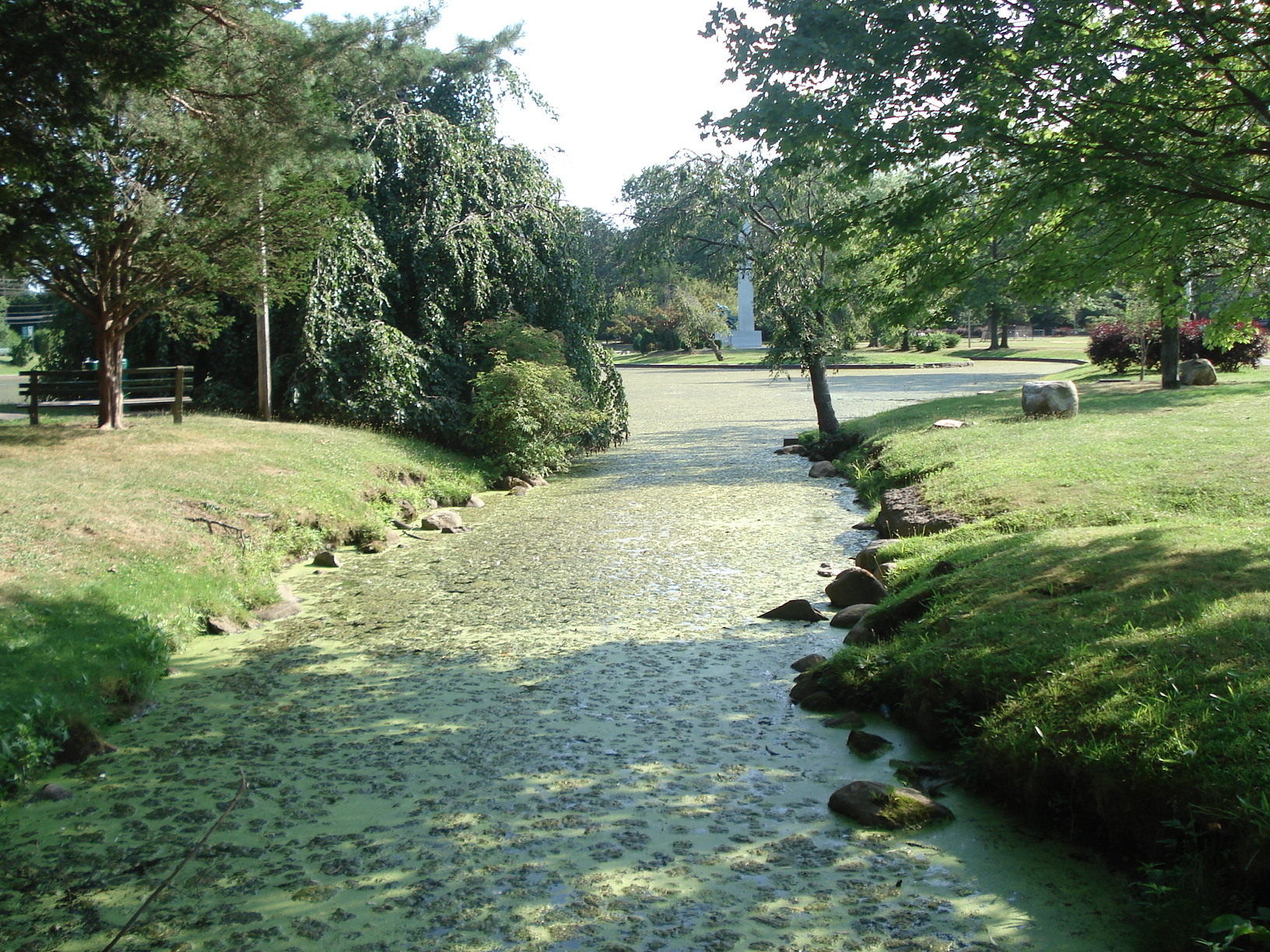
Toney's Brook with the pond and memorial in the background

The park is surrounded by roads on three sides, and by the rears of residential lots on the remaining southern side. To the north is a street named after the park, Parkway, and to the West, Edgemont Road. Across this road is Edgemont Elementary School. On the East, Valley Road borders the park. In the eastern part of the park there is a pond with fountains, fed and flowing into Toney's Brook. The pond is artificial, created by a dam, and has severe growth of algae and scum. This scum has damaged the health of Toney's Brook downstream. An accessible children's playground is here.

== Memorial ==
The most prominent feature of the park is the pond and the small island with the World War I memorial on it. Edgemont Park is known for its World War I memorial, which is one of the landmarks of Montclair. The main memorial, created in 1924 by Charles Keck, is a tall obelisk with bronze sculptures of Winged Victory on top and the Billy Boys on the bottom. On the sides of the obelisk are etched the names of those who fell in the First World War, to whom the monument is dedicated. In front of the memorial there are small plaques that have the names of those who died in the Vietnam War and Korean War and World War II.

== Amenities ==
- Baseball/softball diamonds
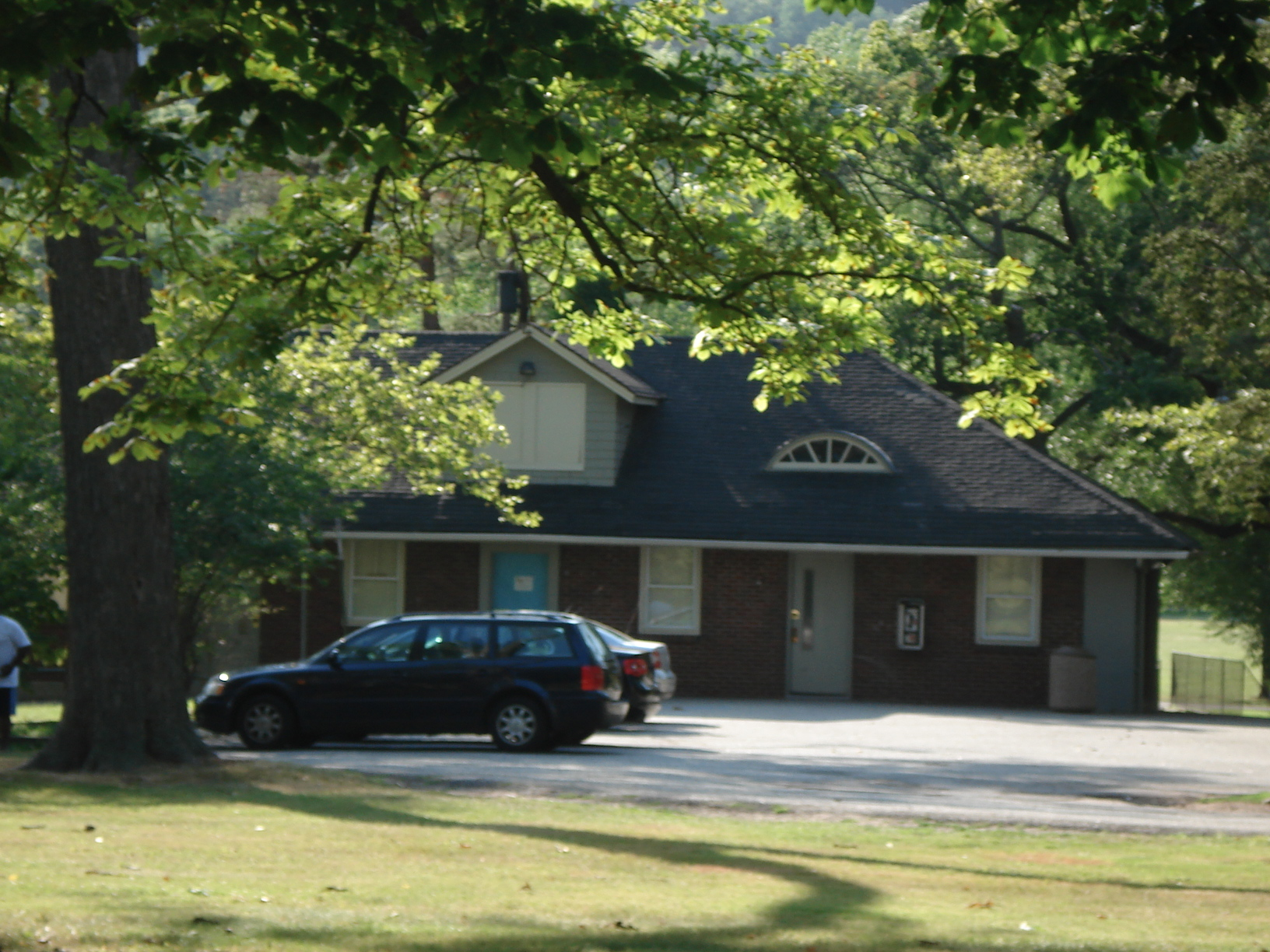
  The shelter house
- Pond
- Shelter house with restrooms and kitchen
- Children's playground
- Bikeways and Footpaths
- Ice skating in the winter, outdoor
- Band concerts
- Fourth of July picnic
- Holiday memorial services
- Memorial Obelisk
- Cherepovets Garden

== Gallery ==
Edgemont Memorial Park Gallery

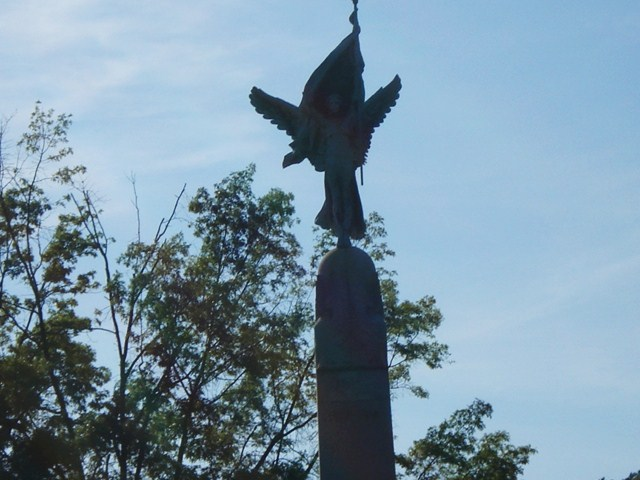
A landmark in Montclair, World War I Memorial in Edgemont Park

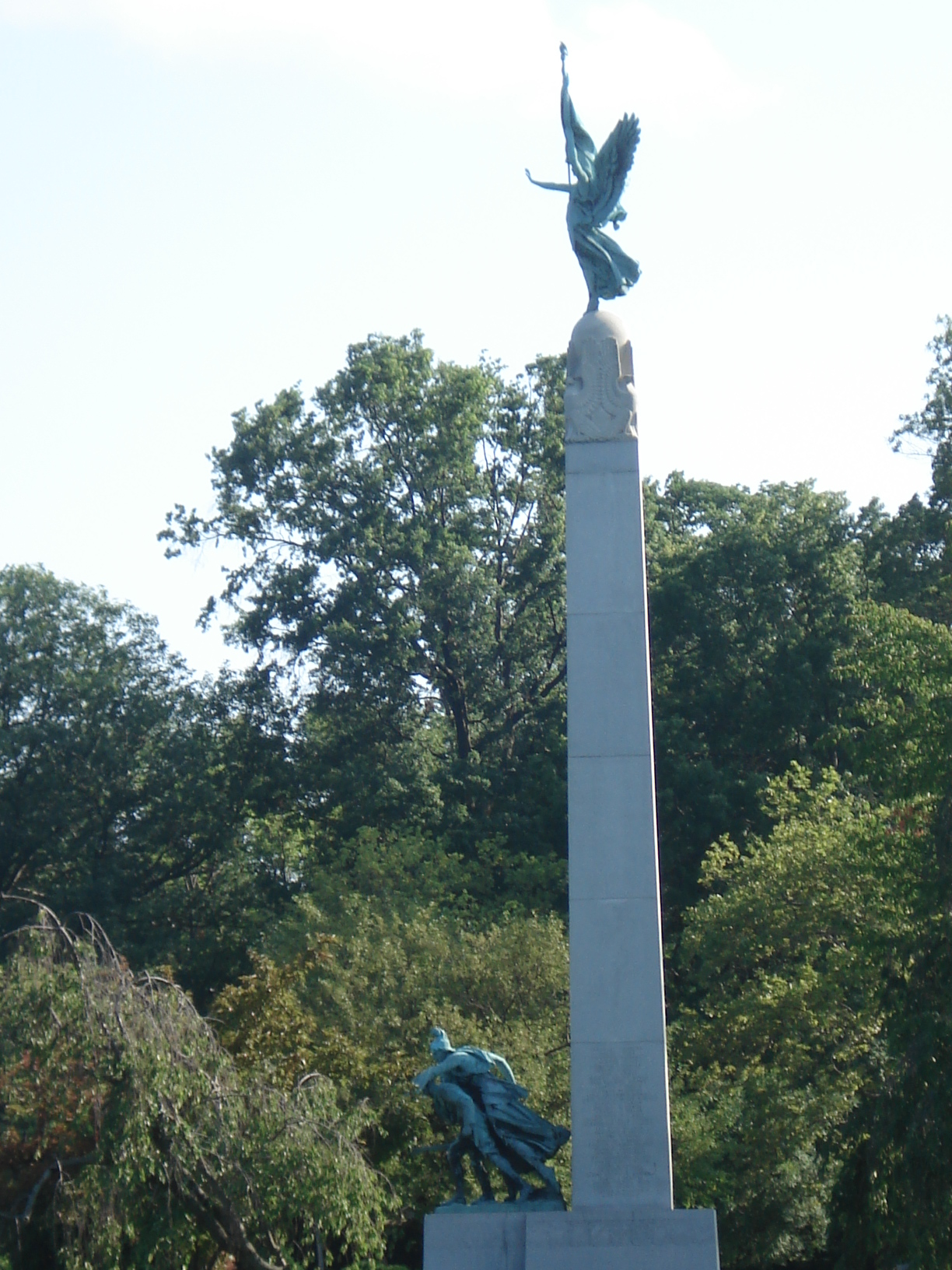
World War I Memorial with the sculptures of Winged Victory and the Billy Boys

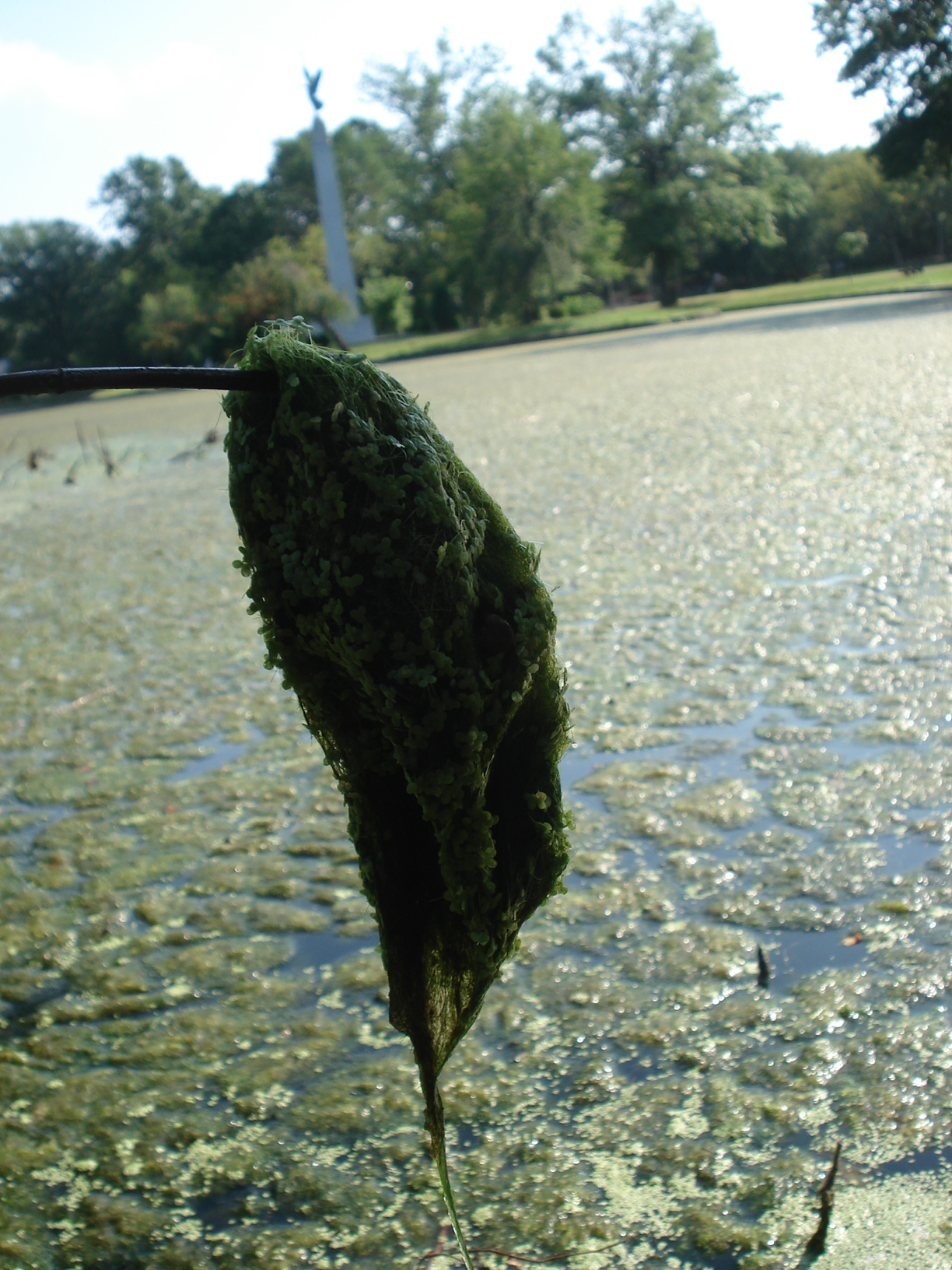
Close-up of the algaeic scum that covers half of the pond

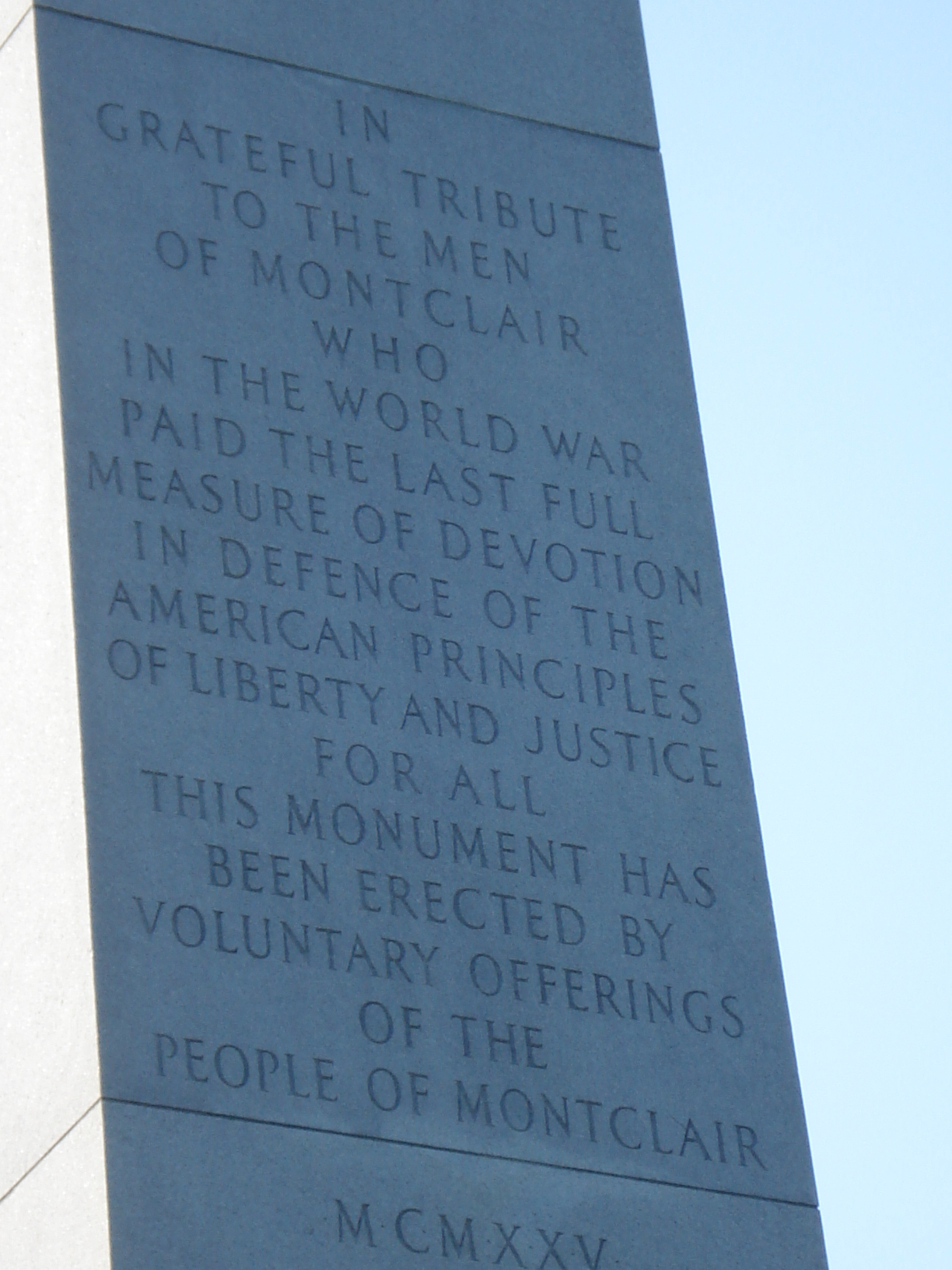
Portion of the memorial obelisk

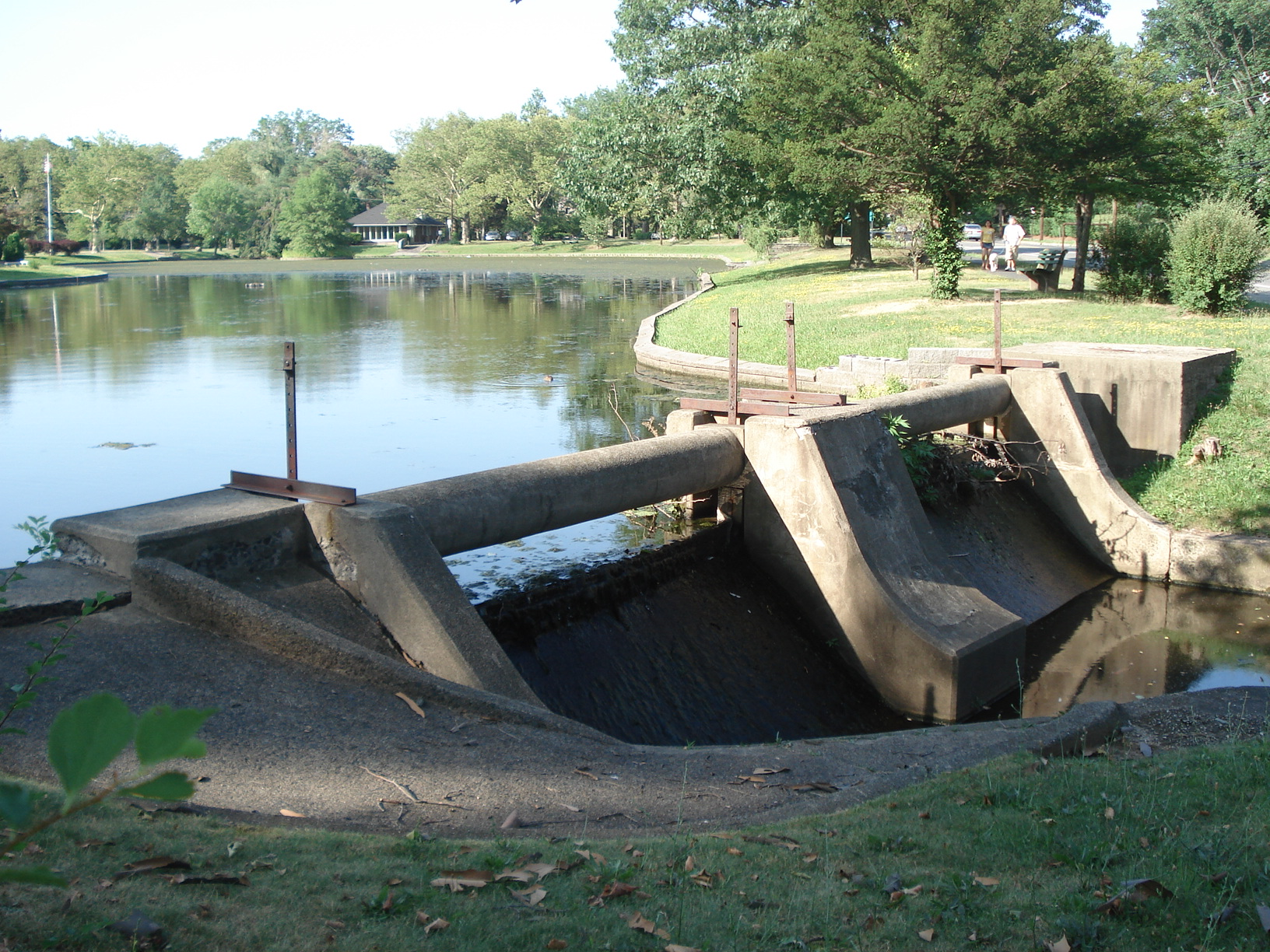
The dam

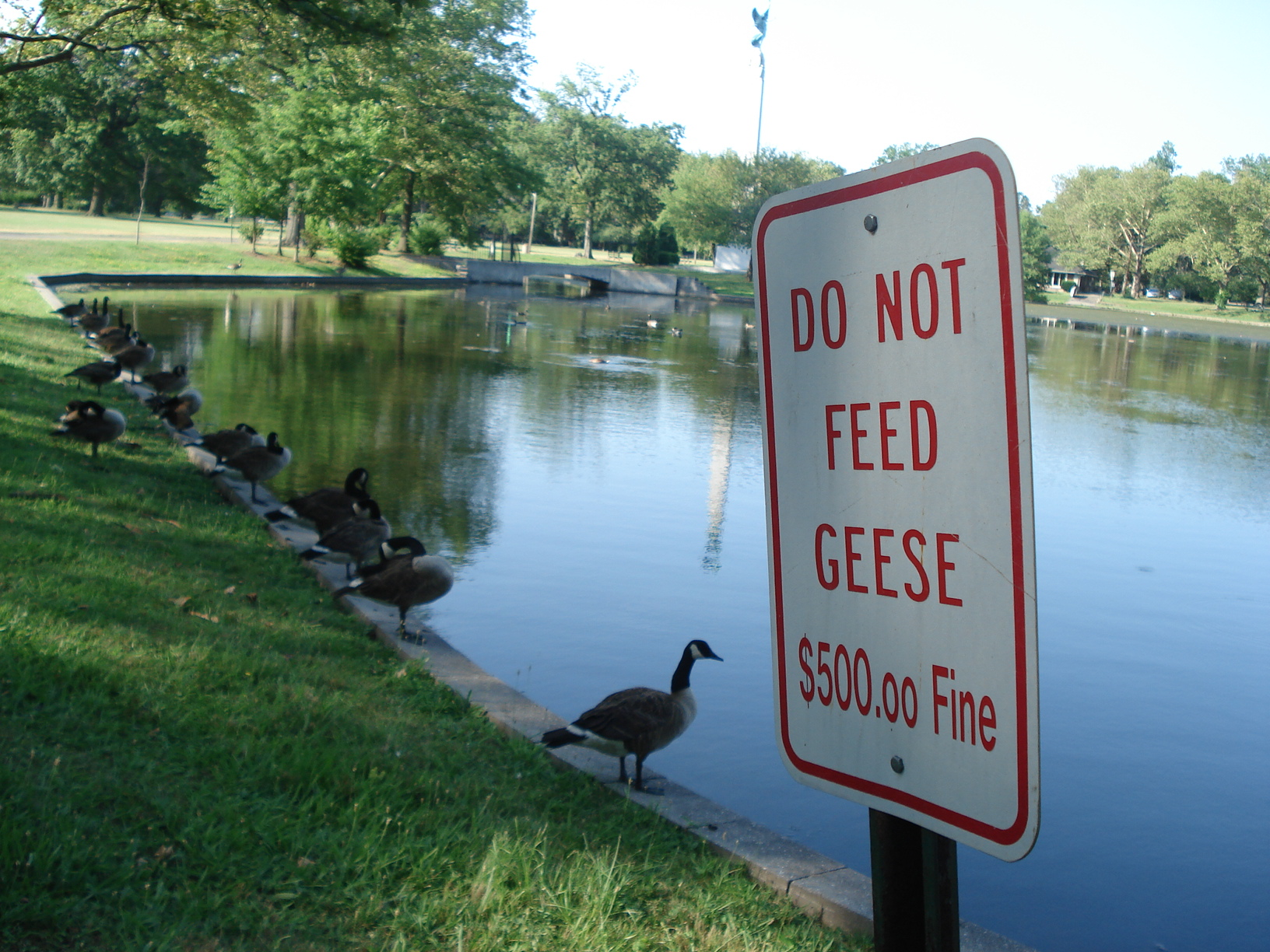
Geese excrete solid waste and sit on the side of the pond
