= Second River =

Second River may refer to:

- Second River (Michigan), a river in Michigan
- Second River (New Jersey), a tributary of the Passaic River in New Jersey
- Second River, the original name for the town of Belleville, New Jersey
