= Essex Park (New Jersey) =

Municipal park in New Jersey

- Location within Essex County, New Jersey Location within New Jersey
- Type: Municipal park
- Location: Montclair, New Jersey
- Nearest city: Newark, New Jersey
- Coordinates: 40°49′20″N 74°12′28″W
- Area: 9.9-acre (40,000 m^{2})
- Owner: City of Montclair
- Manager: Department of Recreation and Cultural Affairs
- Status: Operational
- Public transit: Montclair-Boonton Line (NJT)

Essex Park is a municipal park in Montclair, in Essex County, New Jersey, United States.

== Facilities ==
Essex Park is mostly occupied by sports and recreational facilities. These facilities are used often by the Montclair High School's multiple sports teams.

Currently, the park features a swimming pool, a seasonal ice skating rink, a soccer and football field made of artificial turf, a quarter mile running track, three baseball fields, multiple footpaths/bikeways, a small sledding hill and open field space.

== Location ==
Essex Park is in central Montclair. It is bordered on the west side by New Jersey Transit's Montclair-Boonton Line, on the north by Champlain Terrace, on the east by Essex Avenue, and comes to a point in the south next to the Walnut Street station. Going through it is Chestnut Street, separating the pool, playground, and skating rink from the rest of the park.

== Parking Issues ==
For football games, spectators would park along Essex Street, often breaking laws by blocking corners, driveways, fire hydrants, even streets. At one point a fire truck was parked in front of a driveway and was asked to move, which it did, to a 'no parking' sign. This was protested by local residents and a decision by the Montclair Town Council banned parking on parks of Essex Street. For the Ice rink and pool, signs direct motorists to a parking lot which connects to a parking lot of the Walnut Street Railway Station.

== Playground ==
A small, densely wooded playground abuts Essex Park's public pool and ice rink. The playground has swings and numerous jungle gyms for children ages 3 and up. Approximately 15 picnic tables are available for public use.

== Ice Rink Privatization ==
In 2008, the township of Montclair was looking for ways to lower its budget and as part of a series of budget cuts and cancellations decided that the ice rink at Essex Park, the Clary Anderson Arena, should be privatized. Montclair residents worried that entry fees might increase and that the quality of service would go down, and the township decided to retain authority in some way over the rink while having it operated privately. The operation of the arena was taken over by Ohio-based United Skates of America in September 2008.
