= Glenfield Park (New Jersey) =

County park in Essex County, New Jersey, United States

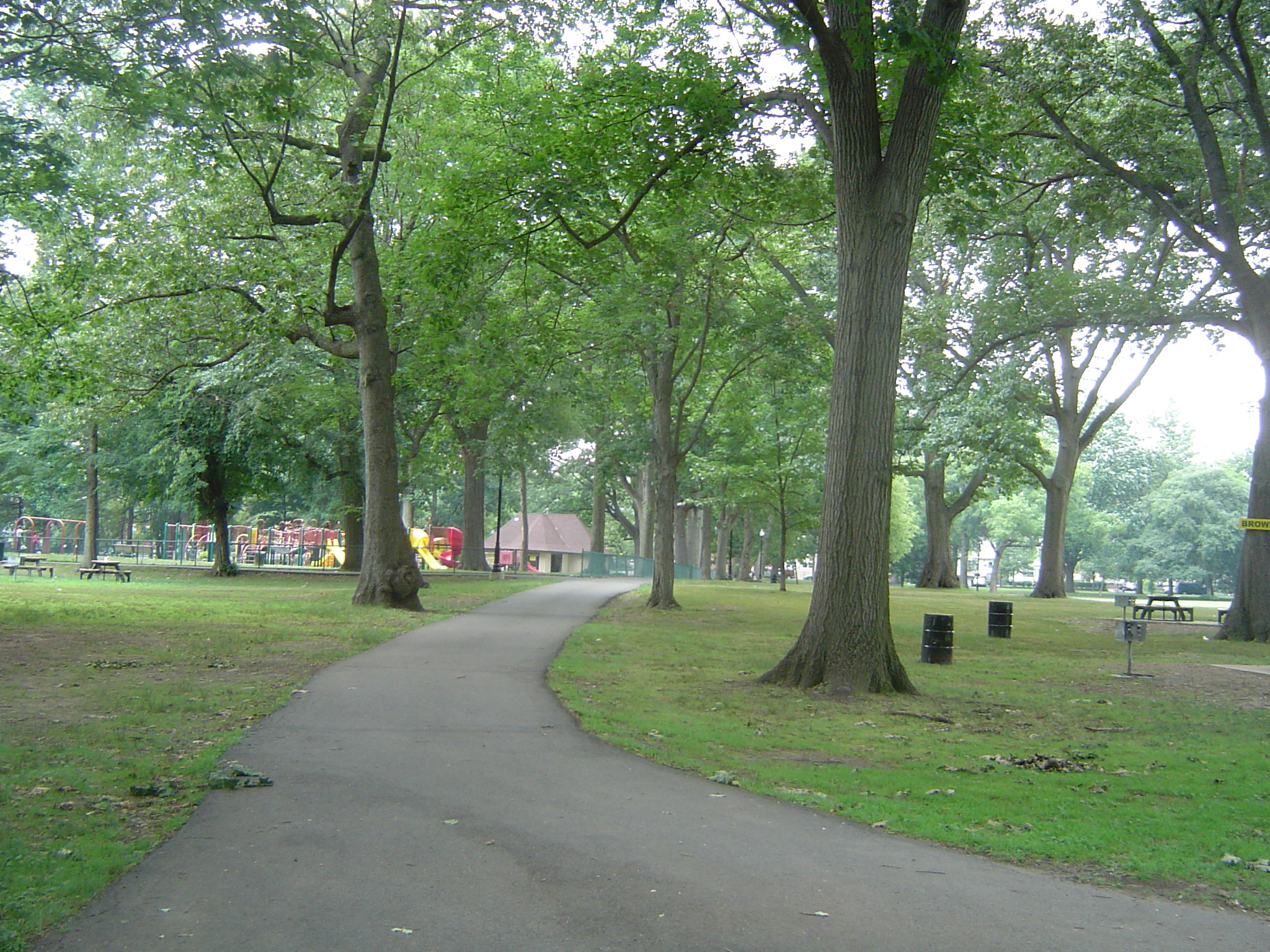
- Interactive map of Glenfield Park
- Type: Public Park
- Location: Montclair and Glen Ridge
- Coordinates: 40.80473°N 74.211273°W
- Area: 20 acres (81,000 m^{2})
- Operator: Essex County
- Open: All year
- Website: http://www.essex-countynj.org/p/index.php?section=parks/sites/gl&ImgLoc=images/gl

Glenfield Park is a county park in Montclair, with a small part in Glen Ridge, both in Essex County, New Jersey. It has 19-acre (77,000 m^{2}) in Montclair, and 1-acre (4,000 m^{2}) in Glen Ridge. It shares a name with the nearby Glenfield Middle School. Glenfield Park is part of the Essex County Park System.

== Creation ==
In 1910, the land for the park was given by the township of Montclair to the Essex County Park system. The Park was then designed by the Olmsted Brothers, a famous landscape design firm.

== Overview ==
Glenfield Park, from the Maple Avenue side, looks like a collection of athletic fields with paths and trees between; there is more, however - behind the playgrounds, baseball diamonds, and tennis courts, there is a forest with tall trees and thick ground cover. Through it goes paved and unpaved trails, and also a stream, Toney's Brook. This area is home to much wildlife, and the only natural terrain of its caliber for miles around. The railroad is discreetly hidden behind the brook.

The area containing the brook, known as the Glen, is overgrown and hard to navigate. There are a few small arch bridges, which cross the brook, and connect walking paths, but one has been cordoned off and closed due to its deterioration.

== Location ==
Glenfield Park is in southeastern Montclair, near the town line with Glen Ridge. It is bordered to the south by Woodland Avenue, and west by Maple Avenue. To the east, it is bordered by NJ Transit's Montclair-Boonton Line. It is also bordered to the northeast by Bloomfield Avenue, the main road in Montclair.

== Facilities ==
- 2 basketball courts
- 3 tennis courts
- 2 softball/baseball diamonds
- community center with game rooms, meeting rooms, craft rooms, kitchen, and restrooms
- 2 children's playgrounds
- footpaths
- Football field
- Event gazebos
- Fitness course
- Nature trail
- Grass Roots program
