= Toney's Brook =

River in New Jersey, United States

Coordinates: 40.835486°N 74.209825°W

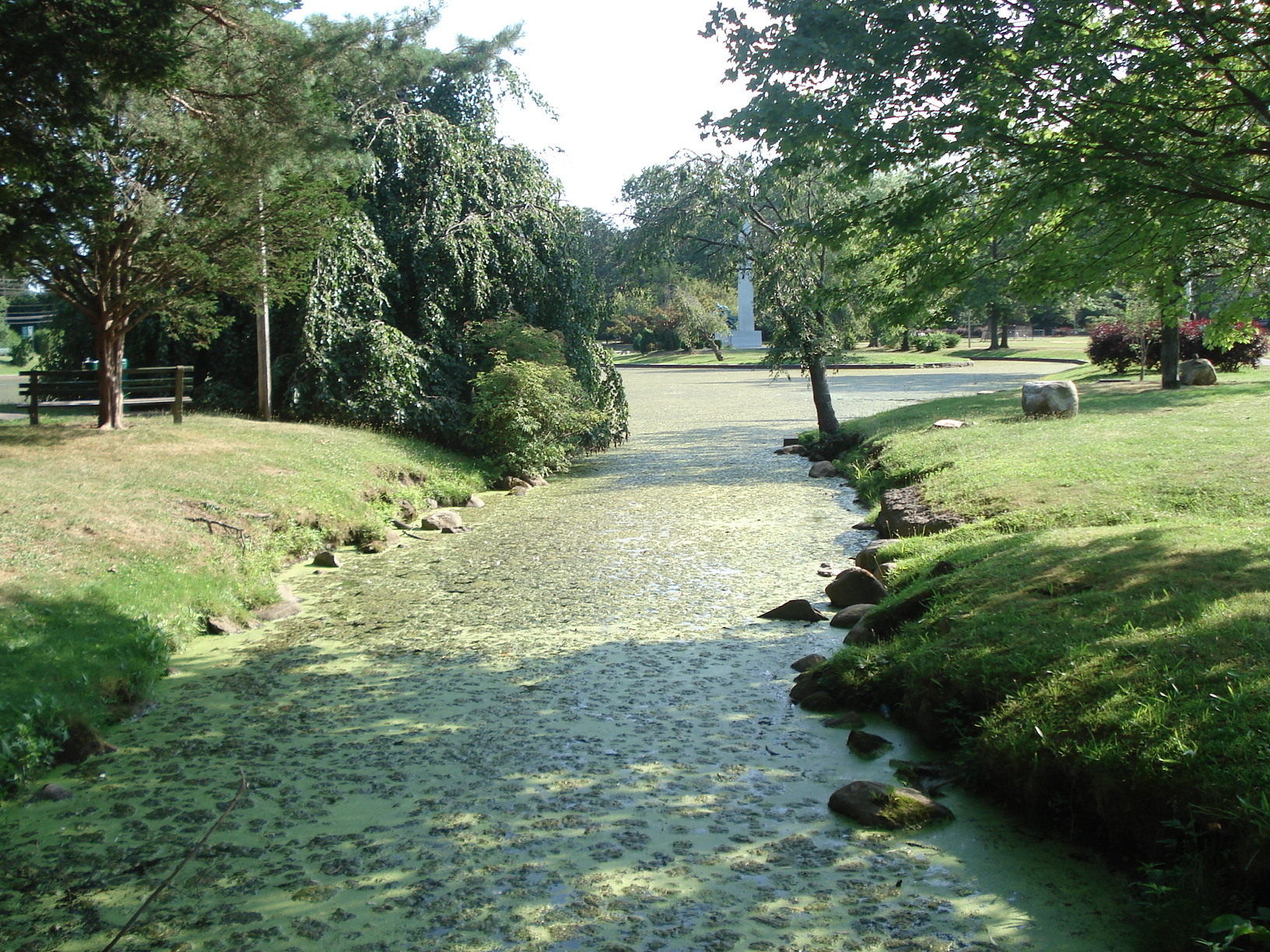
The Brook in Edgemont Memorial Park

Toney's Brook is a tributary of the Second River in Essex County, New Jersey in the United States.

Generally thought to be named for Anthony Oliff, a resident of West Orange (Newark in his time), Toney's Brook originates in Montclair, northwest of the Upper Montclair railway station (originally north of the Montclair Presby Iris Garden), now with two branches, east and west of the elevated railroad tracks at Bellevue. In Montclair, it is joined by two tributary streams, both originally also called Toney's (one called Tunnel Brook, arising from the cliff near Claremont Ave). In Montclair, Toney's Brook runs through Anderson Park, Edgemont Memorial Park, Montclair High School and Glenfield Park.

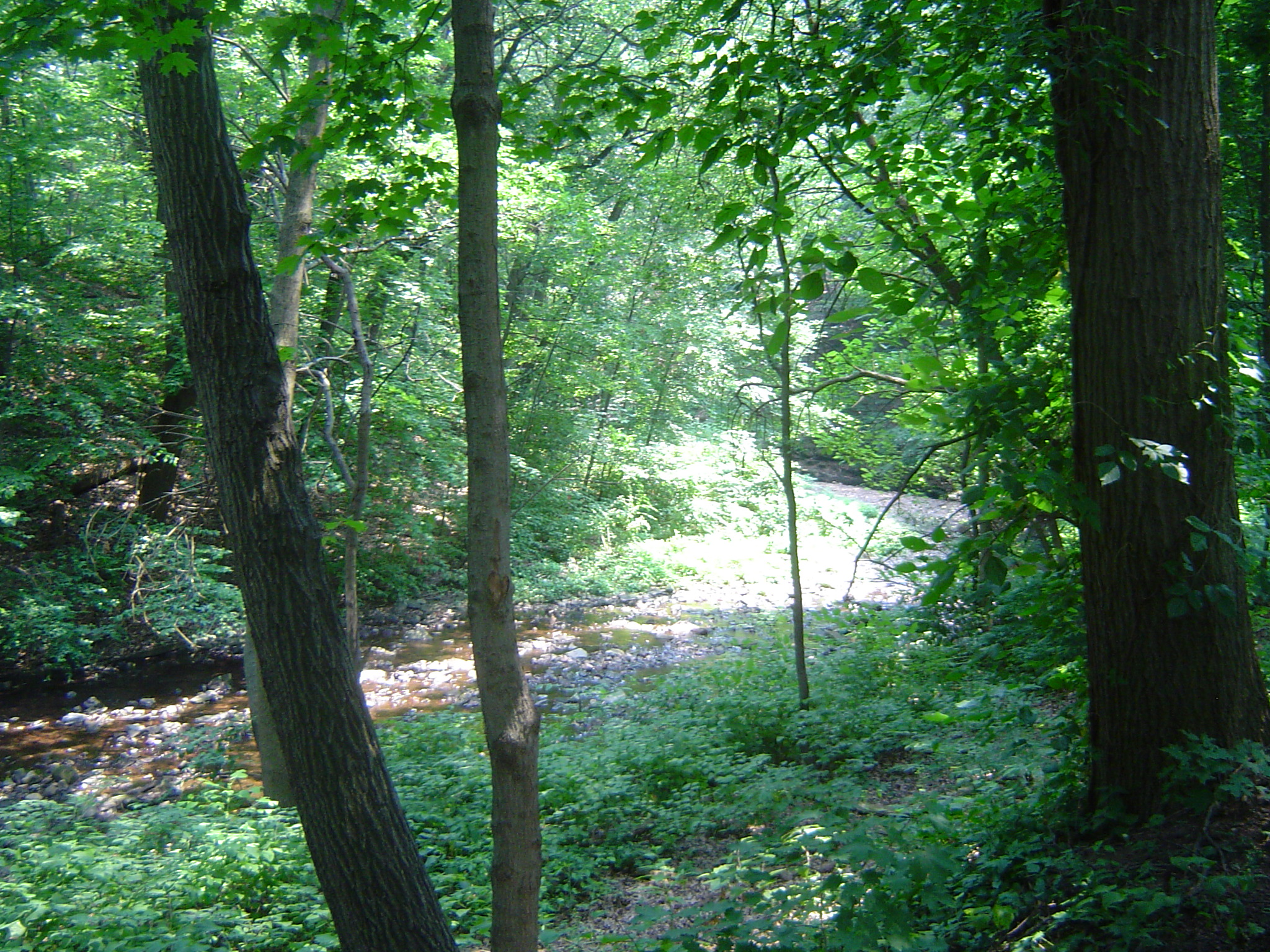
Toney's Brook in Glenfield Park

In Glenfield Park, the brook continues southeast into Glen Ridge, where it flows through The Glen (the glen for which that borough is named).

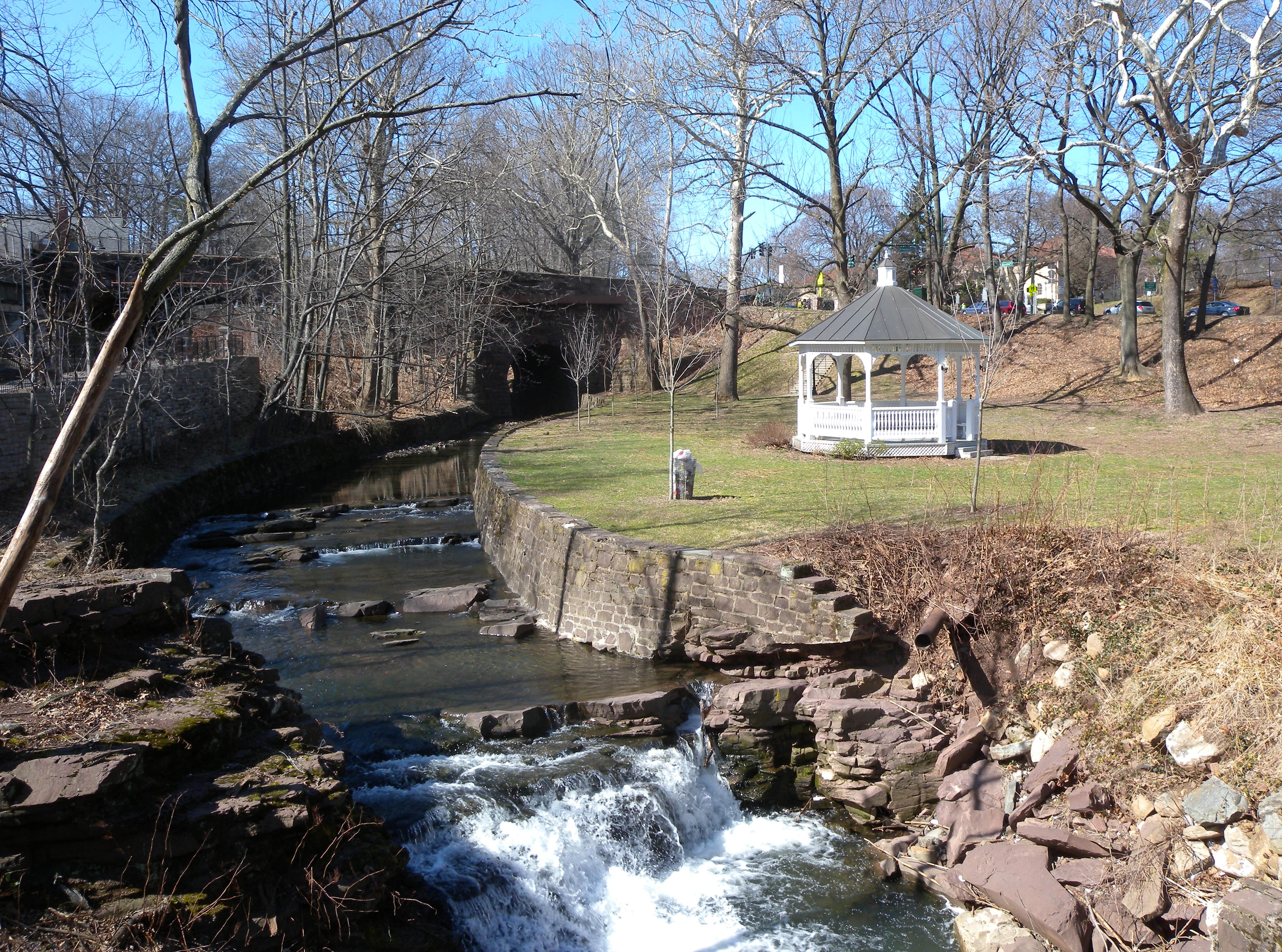
The Brook in The Glen in Glen Ridge

It then flows into Bloomfield, and, in Watsessing Park, joins the Second River, a tributary of the Passaic River. Many roads have been built over the brook, and in some places, it is covered up completely, canalized or culvertised.

In the 19th and early 20th century, Toney's Brook supported several mills, which produced lumber, beer, calico, brass fittings, and pasteboard boxes.

== See also ==
- List of rivers of New Jersey
