= Bradford Elementary School =

Bradford Elementary School is the name of several elementary schools:

In Canada:

- Bradford Public School (Bradford, Ontario), operated by Simcoe County District School Board

In the United States:

- Bradford Elementary School (Bradford, Maine)
- Bradford Elementary School (Bradford, Rhode Island), operated by Westerly Public Schools
- Bradford Elementary School (Bradford, Tennessee)
- Bradford Elementary School (Bradford, Vermont), operated by Bradford Academy & Graded School District
- Bradford Elementary School (Upper Montclair, New Jersey), operated by Montclair Public Schools
- Bradford Public School (Pueblo, Colorado), operated by Pueblo School District 60
- Bradford Primary School and Bradford Intermediate School (Littleton, Colorado), Operated by Jefferson County Public Schools
- West Bradford Elementary School, operated by the Downingtown Area School District
