= Watsessing, New Jersey =

Populated place in Essex County, New Jersey, US

- Census-designated place
- Location in Essex County Location in New Jersey Location in the United States
- Coordinates: 40°47′16″N 74°12′3″W
- Country: United States
- State: New Jersey
- County: Essex
- Township: Bloomfield

Area
  - Total: 0.63 sq mi (1.62 km^{2})
  - Land: 0.62 sq mi (1.60 km^{2})
  - Water: 0.0077 sq mi (0.02 km^{2})
- Elevation: 116 ft (35 m)

Population (2020)
  - Total: 8,078
  - Density: 13,056.3/sq mi (5,041.06/km^{2})
- Time zone: UTC−05:00 (Eastern (EST))
  - Summer (DST): UTC−04:00 (EDT)
- ZIP Code: 07003 (Bloomfield)
- Area codes: 862/973
- FIPS code: 34-77750
- GNIS feature ID: 2806217

Watsessing is a neighborhood and census-designated place (CDP) located in Bloomfield Township, Essex County, in the U.S. state of New Jersey. As of the 2020 census, Watsessing had a population of 8,078. It is in the southwest corner of the township, bordered to the northwest by Glen Ridge, to the southwest by East Orange, to the southeast by the Ampere North part of Bloomfield, and to the northeast by the rest of Bloomfield. Watsessing Park is in the center of the community, in the valley of the Second River or Watsessing River, part of the Passaic River watershed.

The Garden State Parkway runs through the center of the community, on the southeast side of Watsessing Park, with access from Exit 148. The parkway leads north 5 miles (8 km) to Clifton and south through East Orange 5 miles (8 km) to Irvington. The NJ Transit Montclair-Boonton Line has two stops in the community: Watsessing Avenue in the southeast and Bloomfield in the northeast.

== Demographics ==
Historical population
Census	Pop.	Note	%±
2020	8,078		—
U.S. Decennial Census

Watsessing first appeared as a census designated place in the 2020 U.S. census.

=== 2020 census ===
As of the 2020 census, Watsessing had a population of 8,078. The median age was 36.3 years. 18.0% of residents were under the age of 18 and 13.7% of residents were 65 years of age or older. For every 100 females there were 91.6 males, and for every 100 females age 18 and over there were 87.3 males age 18 and over.

100.0% of residents lived in urban areas, while 0.0% lived in rural areas.

There were 3,445 households in Watsessing, of which 27.3% had children under the age of 18 living in them. Of all households, 34.1% were married-couple households, 23.5% were households with a male householder and no spouse or partner present, and 33.7% were households with a female householder and no spouse or partner present. About 35.0% of all households were made up of individuals and 10.1% had someone living alone who was 65 years of age or older.

There were 3,633 housing units, of which 5.2% were vacant. The homeowner vacancy rate was 3.2% and the rental vacancy rate was 4.3%.

Watsessing CDP, New Jersey – Racial and ethnic composition Note: the US Census treats Hispanic/Latino as an ethnic category. This table excludes Latinos from the racial categories and assigns them to a separate category. Hispanics/Latinos may be of any race.
Race / Ethnicity (NH = Non-Hispanic)	Pop 2020	2020
White alone (NH)	2,245	27.79%
Black or African American alone (NH)	2,401	29.72%
Native American or Alaska Native alone (NH)	2	0.02%
Asian alone (NH)	648	8.02%
Native Hawaiian or Pacific Islander alone (NH)	1	0.01%
Other race alone (NH)	96	1.19%
Mixed race or Multiracial (NH)	333	4.12%
Hispanic or Latino (any race)	2,352	29.12%
Total	8,078	100.00%
