= Belleville Dutch Reformed Church =

Historic church in New Jersey, United States

- Reformed Dutch Church of Second River
- U.S. National Register of Historic Places
- New Jersey Register of Historic Places
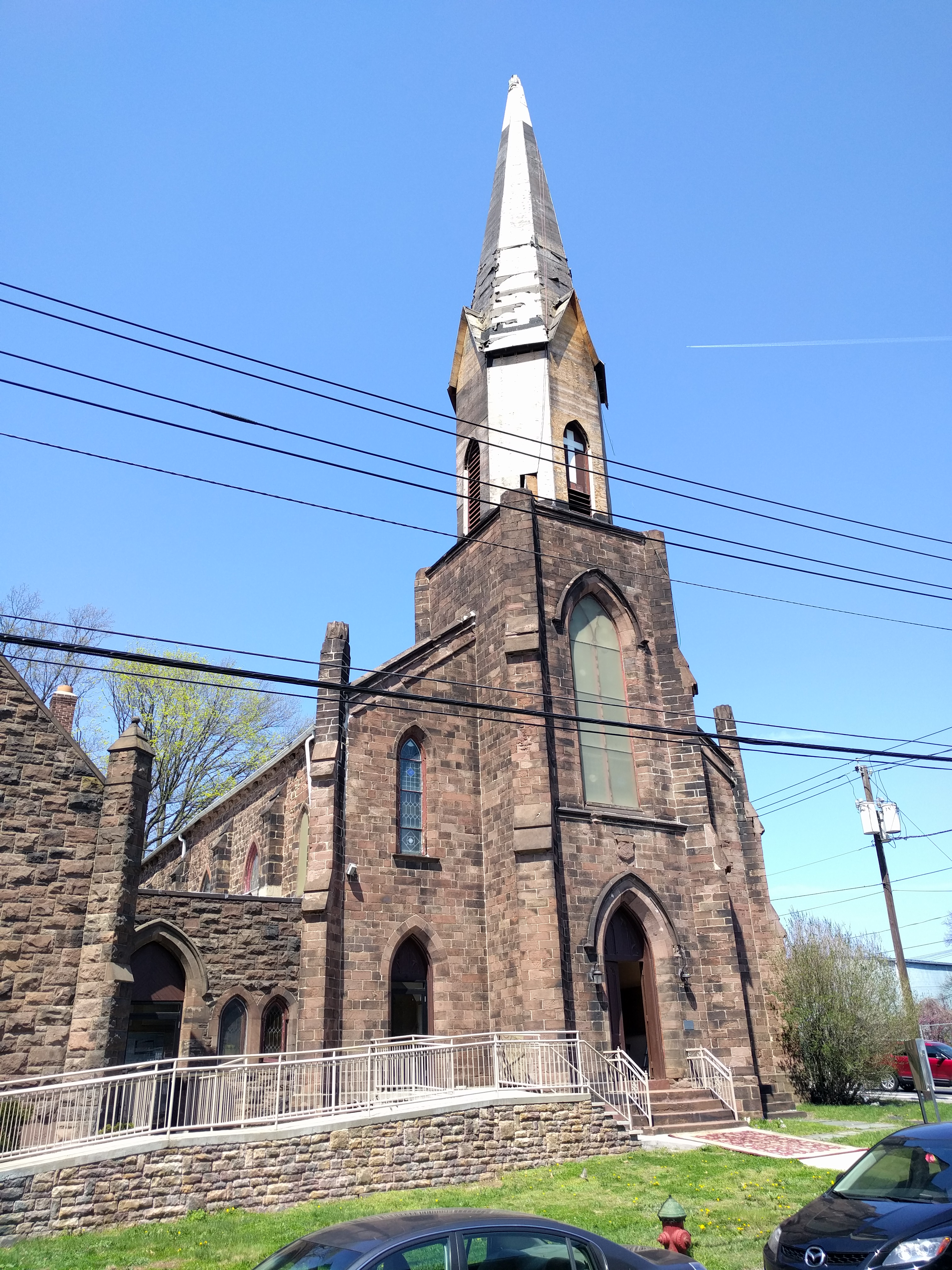
- The Church in 2017

- Location within Essex County, New Jersey Location within New Jersey Location within the United States
- Location: 171 Main Street Belleville, New Jersey
- Coordinates: 40°47′12″N 74°8′56″W
- Area: 0.8 acres (0.32 ha)
- Built: 1853
- Architect: William H. Kirk
- Architectural style: Gothic Revival
- NRHP reference No.: 78001756
- NJRHP No.: 1061

Significant dates
- Added to NRHP: December 21, 1978
- Designated NJRHP: July 12, 1978

The Belleville Dutch Reformed Church, listed on the National Register of Historic Places as Reformed Dutch Church of Second River, is a historic church located in Belleville, Essex County, New Jersey, United States. Founded as a Dutch Reformed church in 1697, it is named after the Second River, which is a tributary of the Passaic River. The church was rebuilt in 1725 and again in 1807. The church steeple was used as an observation post during the American Revolution. Over 62 Revolutionary soldiers are buried in the adjacent graveyard. The current church building was built in 1853.

== See also ==
- National Register of Historic Places listings in Essex County, New Jersey

Media related to Belleville Dutch Reformed Church at Wikimedia Commons
