= Ampere North, New Jersey =

Populated place in Essex County, New Jersey, US

- Census-designated place
- Location in Essex County Location in New Jersey Location in the United States
- Coordinates: 40°46′28″N 74°11′25″W
- Country: United States
- State: New Jersey
- County: Essex
- Township: Bloomfield

Area
  - Total: 0.28 sq mi (0.72 km^{2})
  - Land: 0.28 sq mi (0.72 km^{2})
  - Water: 0 sq mi (0.00 km^{2})
- Elevation: 128 ft (39 m)

Population (2020)
  - Total: 5,132
  - Density: 18,454.2/sq mi (7,125.19/km^{2})
- Time zone: UTC−05:00 (Eastern (EST))
  - Summer (DST): UTC−04:00 (EDT)
- ZIP Code: 07003 (Bloomfield)
- Area codes: 862/973
- FIPS code: 34-01184
- GNIS feature ID: 2806225

Ampere North is an unincorporated community and census-designated place (CDP) in Bloomfield Township, Essex County, in the U.S. state of New Jersey. It is in the southern corner of the township, bordered to the north by the Watsessing CDP, to the northeast by Silver Lake, to the southwest by East Orange, and to the southeast by Newark. Ampere Parkway runs through the center of the CDP, from Bloomfield Avenue at the northeast border of the community, south into the Ampere neighborhood in East Orange.

Ampere North was first listed as a CDP prior to the 2020 census with a population of 5,132.

== Demographics ==
Historical population
Census	Pop.	Note	%±
2020	5,132		—
U.S. Decennial Census; 2020

Ampere North first appeared as a census designated place in the 2020 U.S. census.

=== Racial and ethnic composition ===
Ampere North CDP, New Jersey – Racial and ethnic composition Note: the US Census treats Hispanic/Latino as an ethnic category. This table excludes Latinos from the racial categories and assigns them to a separate category. Hispanics/Latinos may be of any race.
Race / Ethnicity (NH = Non-Hispanic)	Pop 2020	% 2020
White alone (NH)	555	10.81%
Black or African American alone (NH)	1,321	25.74%
Native American or Alaska Native alone (NH)	29	0.57%
Asian alone (NH)	272	5.30%
Native Hawaiian or Pacific Islander alone (NH)	0	0.00%
Other race alone (NH)	200	3.90%
Mixed race or Multiracial (NH)	239	4.66%
Hispanic or Latino (any race)	2,516	49.03%
Total	5,132	100.00%

=== 2020 census ===
As of the 2020 census, Ampere North had a population of 5,132. The median age was 36.0 years. 22.7% of residents were under the age of 18 and 10.3% of residents were 65 years of age or older. For every 100 females there were 91.2 males, and for every 100 females age 18 and over there were 89.9 males age 18 and over.

100.0% of residents lived in urban areas, while 0.0% lived in rural areas.

There were 1,697 households in Ampere North, of which 38.1% had children under the age of 18 living in them. Of all households, 42.0% were married-couple households, 18.5% were households with a male householder and no spouse or partner present, and 32.2% were households with a female householder and no spouse or partner present. About 18.1% of all households were made up of individuals and 5.4% had someone living alone who was 65 years of age or older.

There were 1,798 housing units, of which 5.6% were vacant. The homeowner vacancy rate was 1.8% and the rental vacancy rate was 5.4%.
