= Montclair High School (New Jersey) =

High school in Essex County, New Jersey, US

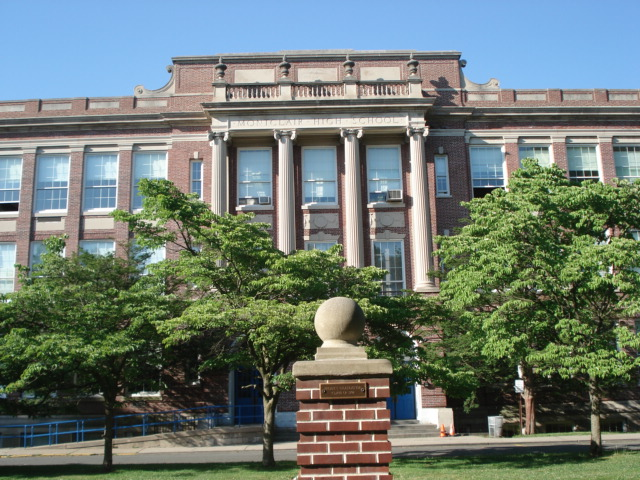

Location
- 100 Chestnut Street; Montclair, Essex County, New Jersey 07042; United States; 40.82305°N 74.21305°W

Information
- Type: Public high school
- Motto: Children our future, Diversity our strength
- Established: 1886
- School district: Montclair Public Schools
- NCES School ID: 341056002166
- Principal: Jeffrey A. Freeman
- Faculty: 149.6 FTEs
- Grades: 9-12
- Enrollment: 1,925 (as of 2024–25)
- Student to teacher ratio: 12.9:1
- Colors: Royal blue White
- Athletics conference: Super Essex Conference (general); North Jersey Super Football Conference (football)
- Team name: Mounties
- Rival: Bloomfield High School
- Newspaper: Mountaineer
- Yearbook: Amphitheatre
- Website: mhs.montclair.k12.nj.us

Montclair High School is a comprehensive four-year public high school located in Montclair, in Essex County, in the U.S. state of New Jersey, serving students in ninth through twelfth grades as the lone secondary school of the Montclair Public School District. The school has been accredited by the Middle States Association of Colleges and Schools Commission on Elementary and Secondary Schools since 1928.

As of the 2024–25 school year, the school had an enrollment of 1,925 students and 149.6 classroom teachers (on an FTE basis), for a student–teacher ratio of 12.9:1. There were 275 students (14.3% of enrollment) eligible for free lunch and 69 (3.6% of students) eligible for reduced-cost lunch.

== History ==
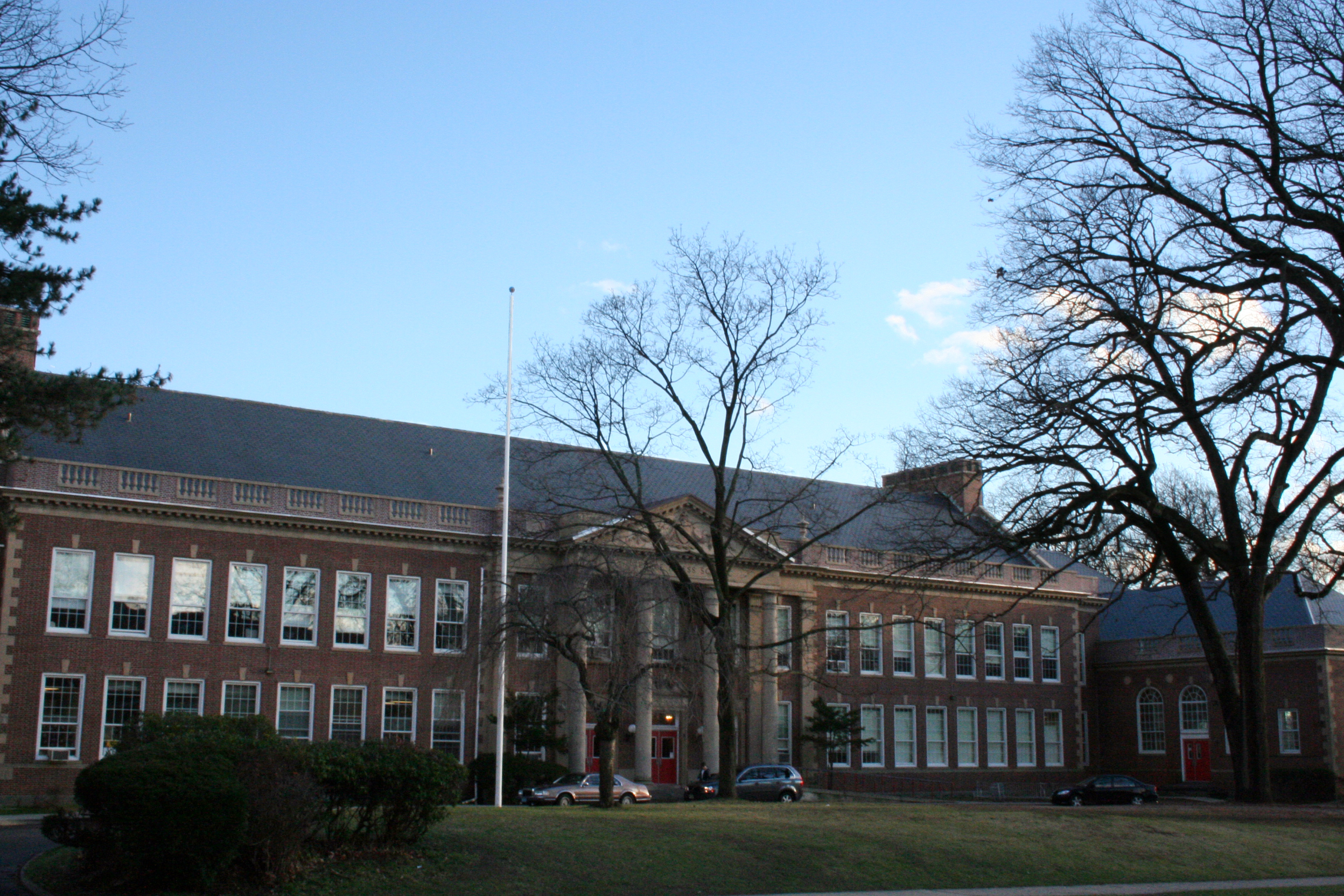
George Inness Annex or Freshman Building

Founded in 1886, Montclair High School quickly outgrew its original location (torn down in the 1930s) on Orange Road, the site of which is now the field of Hillside School. Initially, the school included just the Main Building but as time went on and the enrollment grew, the board of education allowed the high school to annex George Inness Freshman High School building across the street which is used for ninth-grade classes.

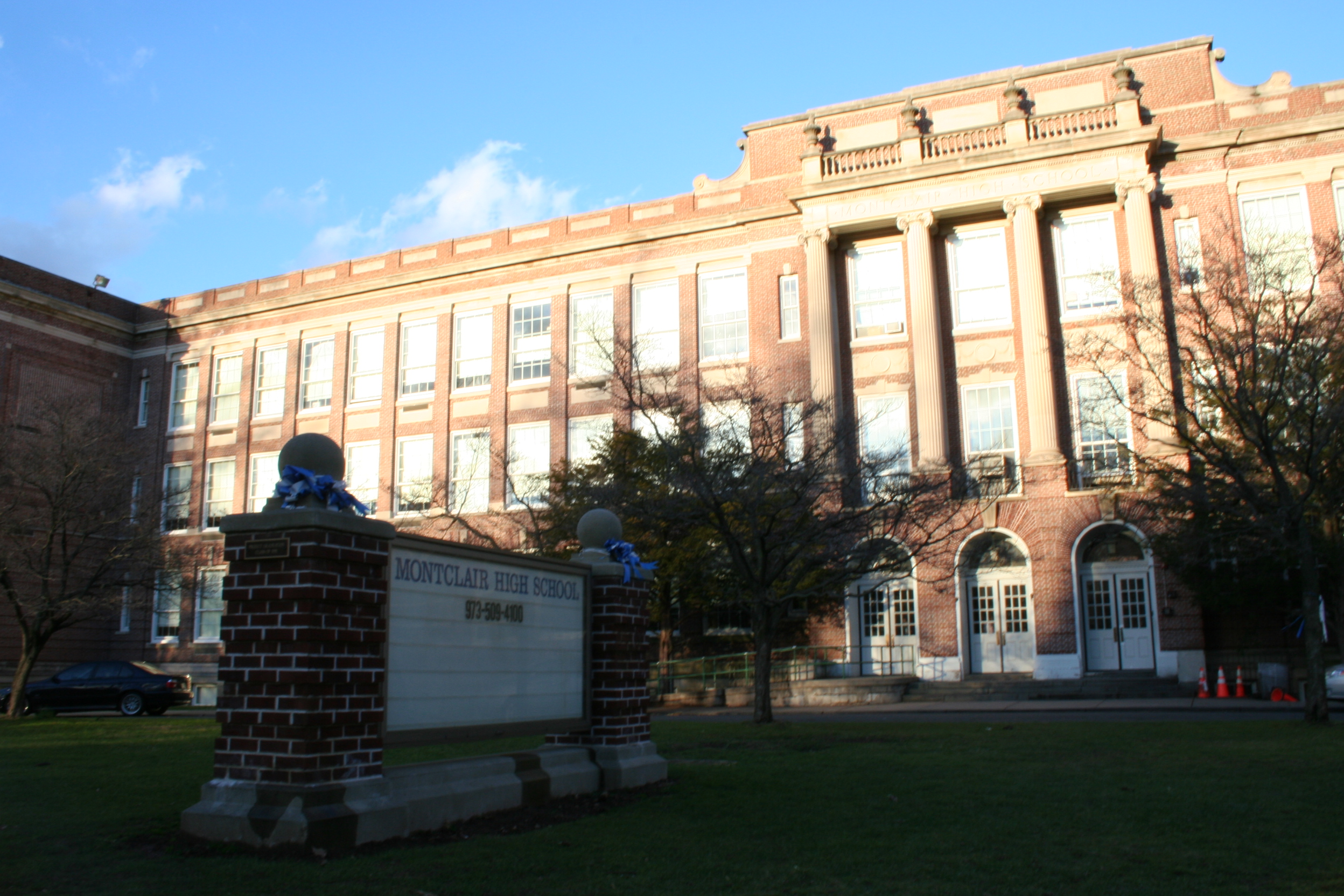
The front façade of the Main building with the old marquee. The marquee was replaced with an electronic signboard.

== Facilities ==
The school holds classes in two buildings. The Main Building of the high school is located 100 Chestnut Street, and the George Innes Annex or Freshman building is located on 141 Park Street. Montclair High School has an amphitheater. Its Woodman Field and Furlong Field House are on Essex Avenue, two blocks east of the main campus.

== Rankings ==
The school was the 120th-ranked public high school in New Jersey out of 339 schools statewide in New Jersey Monthly magazine's September 2014 cover story on the state's "Top Public High Schools", using a new ranking methodology. The school had been ranked 99th in the state of 328 schools in 2012, after being ranked 94th in 2010 out of 322 schools. The magazine ranked the school 85th in 2008 out of 316 schools. The school was ranked 90th in the magazine's September 2006 issue, which included 316 schools.

Schooldigger.com ranked the school 201st out of 376 public high schools statewide in its 2010 rankings (a decrease of 56 positions from the 2009 rank), which were based on the combined percentage of students classified as proficient or above proficient on the language arts literacy and mathematics components of the High School Proficiency Assessment (HSPA).

In Newsweek's May 22, 2007, issue, ranking the country's top high schools, Montclair High School was listed in 896th place, the 24th-highest ranked school in New Jersey. The school was listed in 214th place, the eighth-highest-ranked school in New Jersey, in Newsweek's May 8, 2006, issue, listing the Top 1,200 High Schools in the United States.

== Academics ==
Montclair High School's performing arts program includes dance, fine arts, instrumental music, performing arts, theater arts, visual arts, and vocal music.

In 2009 and 2013, seniors of the Civics and Government Institute at Montclair High placed second in the state at the We the People: The Citizen and the Constitution competition held in Trenton, New Jersey. The 2013 team qualified for the We the People national finals in Washington D.C., but were unable to attend due to budgetary concerns.

== Faculty ==
The school's principal is Jeffrey A. Freeman. His core administration team includes four assistant principals.

"Humanities" and "Philosophy and Composition" teacher Gregory Woodruff was named "Humanities Teacher of the Year" by the New Jersey Council for the Humanities in 2010, for teaching highly rigorous classes in classical and contemporary literature and philosophy. He was awarded the Weston Award in 2011.

== Clubs and activities ==
As of the 2021–22 school year, Montclair High School had 107 clubs. In 2009, 2011, and 2012, the members of the Model Congress/Model United Nations Club won "Best Delegation" at the University of Pennsylvania Model Congress Conference. Montclair High School's Fed Challenge Team has ranked first in the New York Region eight times and won the National Fed Challenge Championship in 2001. The Montclair High School competes in the FIRST Robotics Competition.

In 2007, 2009, and 2016, Montclair High School won the Euro Challenge championship. In 2001, Montclair High School came in 2nd place in the National High School Mock Trial Championships held in Omaha, Nebraska. It was the New Jersey High School Mock Trial champion in 2006, and was named co-champion with Bordentown Regional High School in 2020 after the finals were canceled due to the COVID-19 pandemic.

== Athletics ==
The Montclair High School Mounties compete in the Super Essex Conference, which includes public and private high schools in Essex County and was established following a reorganization of sports leagues in Northern New Jersey by the New Jersey State Interscholastic Athletic Association (NJSIAA). Until the NJSIAA's 2009 realignment, the school participated in Division B of the Northern New Jersey Interscholastic League, which was comprised of high schools located in Bergen County, Essex County, and Passaic County, and was separated into three divisions based on NJSIAA size classification. With 1,596 students in grades 10–12, the school was classified by the NJSIAA for the 2019–20 school year as Group IV for most athletic competition purposes, which included schools with an enrollment of 1,060 to 5,049 students in that grade range. The football team competes in the Liberty White division of the North Jersey Super Football Conference, which includes 112 schools in 20 divisions, making it the nation's biggest football-only high school sports league. The school was classified by the NJSIAA as Group V North for football for 2024–2026, which included schools with 1,317 to 5,409 students. Montclair's sports programs include rowing, baseball, football, lacrosse, soccer, ice hockey, basketball, volleyball, softball, track and field, fencing, golf, cross country, field hockey, gymnastics, swimming, wrestling, tennis, and bowling.

MHS expanded and refurnished its field house at Woodman Field in Essex Park. The field house houses restrooms, locker rooms, and meeting areas for many of the Montclair sports teams, in particular football. Completed for the 2008–09 school year at an estimated cost of $5 million, the field house accommodates a new weight lifting gym with glass walls overlooking Woodman Field, a film screening room for the Montclair Mounties football team, and observation rooms looking over Woodman Field. After receiving a pledge from the Furlong family of $3 million towards the project, the Furlong Field House at Montclair High School was constructed, with a ribbon-cutting ceremony in October 2008.

The baseball team won the North II Group IV state sectional championship titles in 1959, 1961, 1963, and 1964. The team won the Greater Newark Tournament in 1942, 1948, 1954, 1963, 2012, and 2019; the program's six titles were the third-most in tournament history as of 2019. The team won the Greater Newark Tournament in 2019, beating Seton Hall Preparatory School by a score of 12-1 under the mercy rule.

The boys' fencing team was the épée team winner in 2013, 2014, and 2016.

The girls' fencing team was the épée team winner in 2016, 2017, and 2018.

The girls' field hockey team won the North II Group IV state sectional title in 1980, 1982, 1985, 1986, 1988, and 1990, and won the North I Group IV title in 2003, 2004, 2010, 2012, and 2014. The team won the Group IV state championship in 1980 and 1985. The 1980 team finished the season 13-3-3 after winning the Group IV title with a 3–0 win against Toms River High School North in the tournament final at Mercer County Park.

The football team won the North II Group IV state sectional championships in 1983, 1994, 1996, and 2002, and won the North I Group V state title in 2012, 2013, 2014, and 2017. In 2014, the team won their third consecutive North I, Group V state title, with a 26–14 win against Passaic County Technical Institute in the final game of the tournament, played at MetLife Stadium. In 2017, the team won the North I Group V state sectional championship, the program's eighth state title, with a 35–14 win against Union City High School in the tournament final. In October 2008, a Montclair High School football player, Ryne Dougherty, died as a result of a brain hemorrhage in a football game. The school's football rivalry with Bloomfield High School was listed at 19th on NJ.com's 2017 list "Ranking the 31 fiercest rivalries in N.J. HS football". Bloomfield was the stronger school in the initial years of the competition, with Montclair dominating since the early 1980s and leading the rivalry with a 69-26-1 overall record as of 2017.

The boys' ice hockey team won the overall state championship in 1981 (defeating Brick Township High School by a score of 6–5 in the tournament final), 1987 (defeating Delbarton School 4–2) and 1988 (defeating St. Joseph of Montvale 2–1), with the two consecutive titles coached by Bruce Parker. They won the public school state championship in 1995 (defeating Chatham High School 2–1 in overtime). Towards the end of every hockey season, the Montclair Mounties host the "Montclair Cup". Every year, at Clary Anderson Arena (the Mounties' home hockey arena), Montclair High School faces off against in-town rival, Montclair Kimberley Academy. The MKA team won the 2011, 2012, and 2013 games.

The boys' lacrosse team won the overall state championship in 1974 and 1975 (defeating Boonton High School both years in the tournament final), 1977, and 1978 (vs. Columbia High School both years), 1980 (vs. Columbia), 1984 (vs. Bridgewater-Raritan High School East), 1985 (vs. Westfield High School), 1992 (vs. Ridgewood High School) and 1997 (vs. Mountain Lakes High School), and won the Group IV state championship in 2010 (vs. Bridgewater-Raritan High School). The 10 state titles won by the program were tied for the fourth-most of any school in the state as of 2022. The 1974 team finished the season with a 13–2 record after winning the inaugural NJSIAA state championship with a 9–2 victory against Boonton. The 1975 team repeated as state champion with a 10–3 win against Boonton in front of a crowd of 2,000. The 1984 team finished the season with a 16–2 record after winning the program's sixth state title with a 12–6 win against Bridgewater-Raritan,

The rowing team has had success in New Jersey and nationally. The girls' lightweight 4x placed 3rd at nationals in 2016. In 2017, Montclair won the men's and women's Garden State Scholastics points trophies, the first public school to do so. Later in the season, the Men's Senior 8+ became Stotesbury Regatta Champions, a first for the program, making history as the first public high school boat to win the Stotesbury Cup in a decade. The Second Varsity 8+ placed third. The boat also became Scholastic Rowing Association of America National Champions and National Schools Rowing Association National Champions.

The girls' soccer team won the Group IV state title in 2014, defeating Hunterdon Central Regional High School by a score of 2–1 in the tournament final to capture the program's first state title and finish the season with a 22–1 record.

The boys' tennis team won the overall state championship in 1953 vs. William L. Dickinson High School (Jersey City).

The boys' track team won the spring / outdoor track title as Group IV champion in 1924–1926, 1928–1932, 1935, 1938, 1939, 1942, 1943 (as co-champion), 1946, 1952–1956, 1958, 1972 and 1974; the team's 21 state titles are the second-most of any team in the state. The boys' track team was indoor public champion in 1931 and won the Group IV title in 1967 and 1985 (as co-champion).

The Montclair ultimate frisbee team won their first state championship in 2023 with a 13–10 win against Columbia High School, and went 29–5 on the season, ranked 10th nationally. They then repeated as state champions in 2024 against Westfield High School, ending the season with a record of 30-6 and winning several regional tournaments. Several of the team players have gone on to play for professional teams such as the New York Empire.

== Student protests ==
Students protested New Jersey Governor Chris Christie's appearance on school grounds on March 30, 2010, in response to ensuing budget cuts that affected the school. Over 200 students walked out of their classes in protest of the budget cuts in April of the same year.

== Popular culture ==
Montclair High School has been featured in or used as a filming location for films and television shows, including:

=== Film ===
- Swimfan (2002)
- Imaginary Heroes (2004)
- Mean Girls (2004)
- Seven Minutes in Heaven (1986)
- Lymelife (2009)

=== Television ===
- Ed – NBC series (2000 to 2004)
- The Sopranos – HBO series
