= Watsessing Park =

Park in New Jersey, United States

Coordinates: 40.7878°N 74.2013°W

Watsessing Park is a park in Essex County, New Jersey, in both the city of East Orange and Watsessing section of Bloomfield Township. The park covers 69 acres (279,000 m^{2}), just west of the Garden State Parkway, and contains the confluence of the Second River and Toney's Brook.

The name "Watsessing" comes from the language of the Lenni Lenape Indians who inhabited the area before European colonization; it means "crooked" or "elbow". This etymology might have been related to the Third River, which also flows through Bloomfield (though not Watsessing Park), and forms an abrupt elbow near the town's center.

Watsessing Park was designed in 1899 by the Olmsted Brothers of Brookline, Massachusetts (sons of Frederick Law Olmsted, designer of Manhattan's Central Park).
