= Clary Anderson =

American football and baseball player and coach (1911–1988)

Biographical details
- Born: July 7, 1911
- Died: August 19, 1988 (aged 77)

Playing career

Football
- 1932–1934: Colgate
- Position: End

Coaching career (HC unless noted)

Football
- 1969–1975: Montclair State

Baseball
- 1970–1976: Montclair State
- 1977: Fairleigh Dickinson

Head coaching record
- Overall: 46–20–3 (college football); 170–73 (college baseball); 209–23–6 (high school football)

Accomplishments and honors

Championships
- Football; 5 NJSAC (1969–1973)

Awards
- 2× Third-team All-American (1932, 1933)

Clarence Oscar "Clary" Anderson (July 7, 1911 – August 19, 1988) was an American football and baseball player and coach. He was the head baseball and football coach for Montclair State University in Upper Montclair, New Jersey.

He was also coach of the Montclair High School ice hockey, basketball, and swimming teams. In the last seven years or of his career he coached the Montclair State College baseball and football teams.

Anderson graduated from Montclair High School (1930), Cook Academy (1931), and Colgate University (1935). He played quarterback for all three was one of the four best players in the undefeated 1932 Colgate University football team, named the “Four Horsemen”.

Anderson spent several years in the New York Giants baseball farm system and some time on the major league team. He then returned to New Jersey to coach. He coached at Blair Academy, and then at Montclair High School (1940-1969). In that time, Montclair High School won 16 Group IV football championships and 11 Newark News State Football Championships. Clary’s baseball teams were ten- time sectional champs and were the Greater Newark Tournament four-time champions and four-time runners up.

In his 27 years as coach, in football, his teams had a .878 winning percentage. In the five sports that he coached, his teams achieved an overall winning percentage of .768. At the end of his coaching career he had a 1039–297–22 record.

Anderson was the Athletic Director for many years at Montclair High School.

Anderson is remembered for the educational and leadership lessons he gave to hundreds of young men at the high school and college level.

== Navy career ==
Anderson was a lieutenant commander in the U.S. Navy for four years during World War II.

== Achievements ==
Anderson coached the first New Jersey college football team to go to (and win) a bowl game (1970 Knute Rockne Bowl). He took two baseball squads to the College World Series (Division II/III), and led the Red Hawks to five NJSCAC championships. He was a minor league catcher for the New York Giants organization, a scout for the Houston Astros, and signing Hall of Famer Craig Biggio.

Anderson compiled a record of 46–20–3 and won the first five conference titles in the newly-formed New Jersey State Athletic Conference, from 1969 to 1973. Prior to that, he was the head coach in football for decades at Montclair High School. As the Montclair State's baseball coach, Anderson went 150–60 in six seasons. For his coaching efforts he was inducted into the Montclair State University Hall of Fame.

Anderson was inducted Into the Sports Hall Of Fame Of New Jersey, and also inducted into the Hall Of Fames at Colgate University, Montclair State University, Montclair High School, and the New Jersey Interscholastic Athletic Association.

Among the players coached by Anderson was the second man on the moon, Apollo 11’s Buzz Aldrin, as well as Royce Flippin, Aubrey Lewis, and John McMullen.

Anderson has an arena named after him in Montclair, New Jersey. The Montclair High School ice hockey team plays their home games at the Clary Anderson Arena.

Anderson authored four sports-themed books: Make the Team in Football, Make the Team in Baseball, The Young Sportsman’s Guide to Football, and The Young Sportsman’s Guide to Baseball.

== Personal life ==
Anderson was married to Claire Aubry for 47 years. They had one daughter, Susan Anderson Geise who is wife of John Geise. There’s one grandson, Randall Anderson Geise, who played baseball at St. Lawrence University.

== Head coaching record ==
=== College football ===
Year	Team	Overall	Conference	Standing	Bowl/playoffs
Montclair State Indians (New Jersey State Athletic Conference) (1969–1975)
1969	Montclair State	8–2	3–0	1st	
1970	Montclair State	9–1	3–0	1st	W Knute Rockne
1971	Montclair State	7–2	3–0	1st	
1972	Montclair State	6–4	3–2	T–1st	
1973	Montclair State	6–4	4–0	1st	
1974	Montclair State	6–3–1	2–2	3rd	
1975	Montclair State	4–4–2	4–1	2nd	
Montclair State:		46–20–3	22–5		
Total:		46–20–3			
National championship Conference title Conference division title or championship game berth
