= Second River (New Jersey) =

River in New Jersey, United States

Coordinates: 40°46′49″N 74°09′03″W

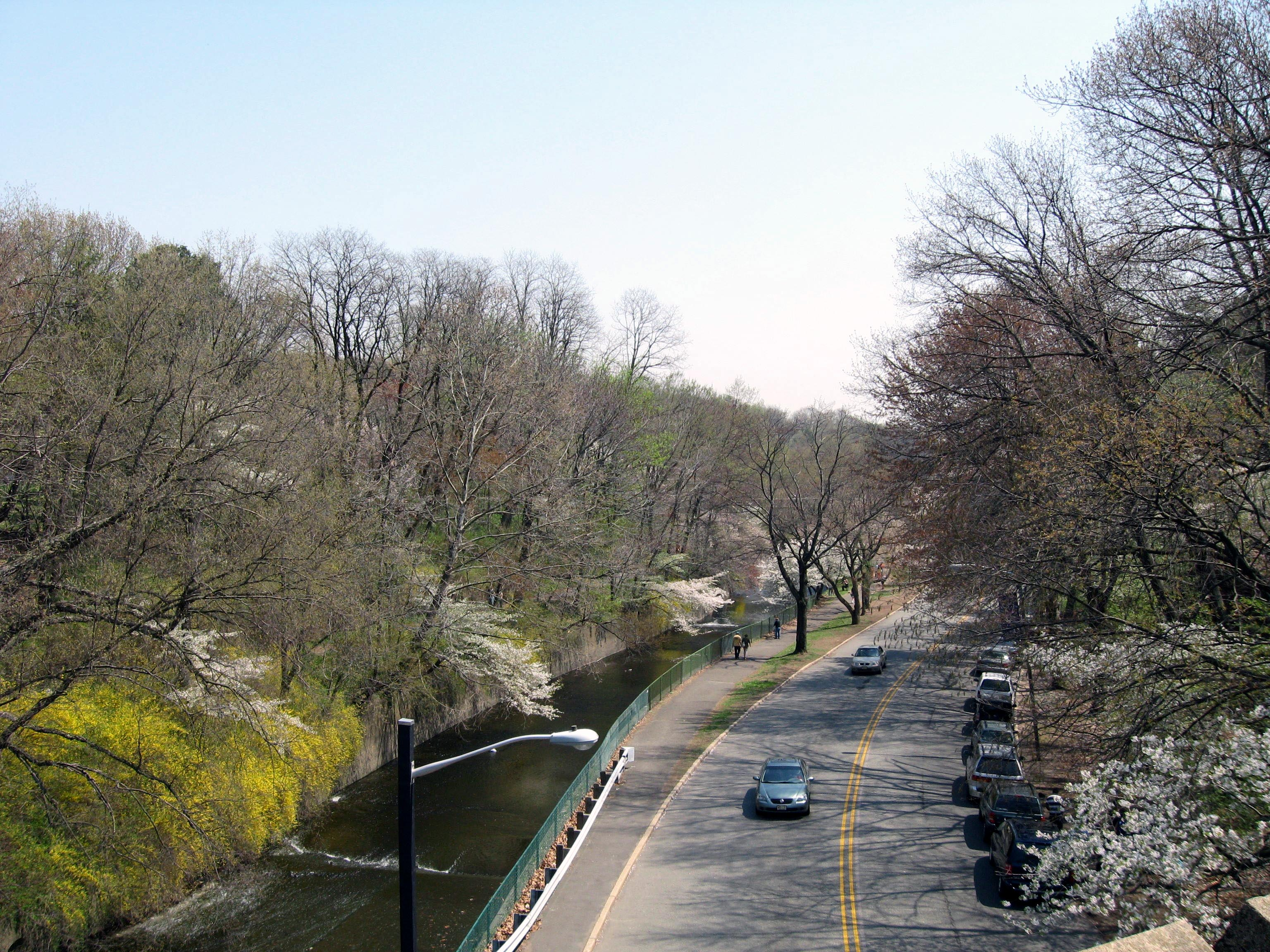
Gorge at north end of Branch Brook Park

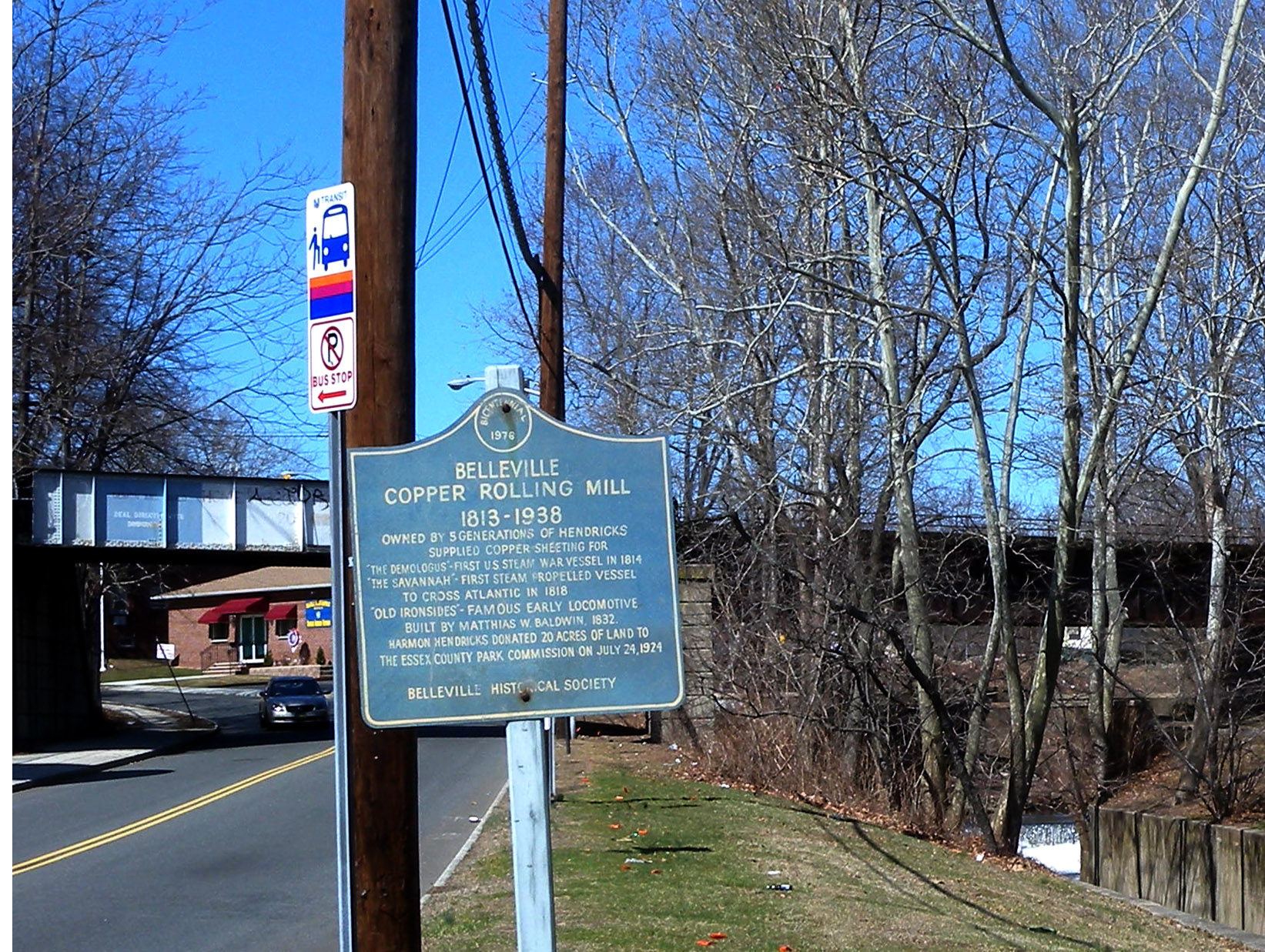
Site of the 19th century Belleville Rolling Mill

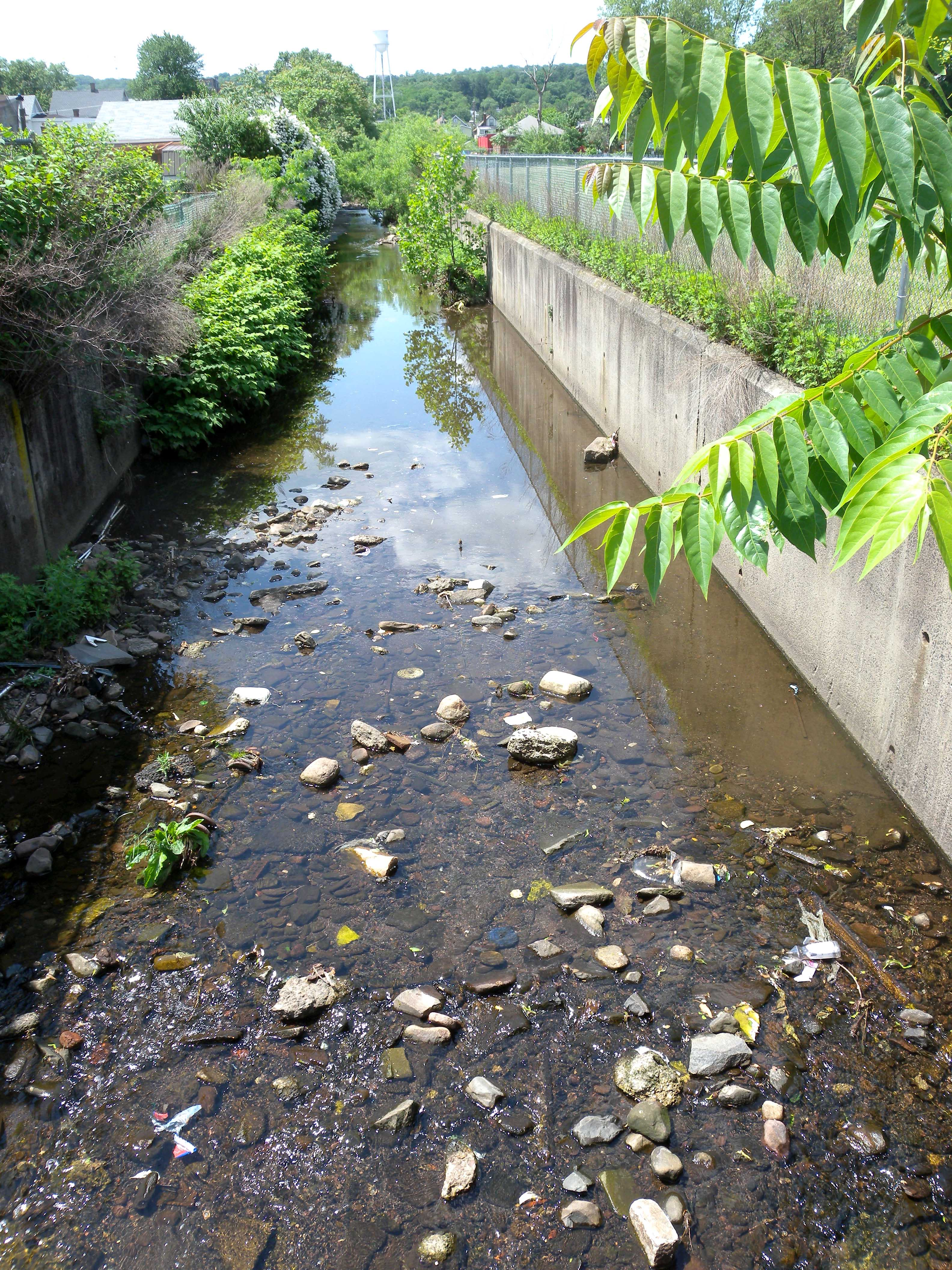
Walled, in Orange

The Second River, or Watsessing River, in the state of New Jersey in the United States, is the second main tributary of the Passaic River encountered while travelling upstream from its mouth at Newark Bay.

From its source in West Orange to the Passaic, it is approximately 5 mi (8 km) long.

From West Orange, the Second River passes generally easterly through the towns of Orange and East Orange, where it is joined by Wigwam, Parrow, and Nishuane Brooks, then turns slightly to the north (though still generally easterly), and enters the town of Bloomfield. Here, at Watsessing Park, it is joined by Toney's Brook.

After leaving Bloomfield, it enters the town of Belleville (which was, early in its history, also named "Second River"), and turns slightly to the south (though still generally easterly). Soon into Belleville, it forms the border between Belleville and Newark. Finally, it joins the Passaic River, on its way to Newark Bay.

In the 19th and early 20th centuries, the Second River supported a sizable industrial complex of mills and factories.

The Reformed Dutch Church of Second River is named after this river.

== Tributaries ==
(As encountered travelling upstream):

- Toney's Brook
- Nishuane Brook
- Parrow Brook
- Wigwam Brook

== See also ==
- List of rivers of New Jersey
