= Montclair Public Schools =

School district in Essex County, New Jersey, US

Address
- 22 Valley Road Montclair, Essex County, New Jersey, 07042; United States
- Coordinates: 40.815983°N 74.221447°W

District information
- Grades: PreK-12
- Superintendent: Damon Cooper (interim)
- Business administrator: Christina Hunt
- Schools: 11

Students and staff
- Enrollment: 6,216 (as of 2022–23)
- Faculty: 564.6 FTEs
- Student–teacher ratio: 11.0:1

Other information
- District Factor Group: I
- Website: www.montclair.k12.nj.us
Ind.	Per pupil	District spending	Rank (*)	K-12 average	%± vs. average
1A	Total Spending	$18,805	60	$18,891	−0.5%
1	Budgetary Cost	15,257	63	14,783	3.2%
2	Classroom Instruction	9,101	68	8,763	3.9%
6	Support Services	3,210	95	2,392	34.2%
8	Administrative Cost	1,324	29	1,485	−10.8%
10	Operations & Maintenance	1,308	17	1,783	−26.6%
13	Extracurricular Activities	261	58	268	−2.6%
16	Median Teacher Salary	67,819	71	64,043
Data from NJDoE 2014 Taxpayers' Guide to Education Spending. *Of K-12 districts with more than 3,500 students. Lowest spending=1; Highest=103

The Montclair Public Schools are a comprehensive community public school district that serves students in kindergarten through twelfth grade from the Township of Montclair, in Essex County, in the U.S. state of New Jersey. The district consists of seven elementary schools, three middle schools and one high school.

As of the 2022–23 school year, the district, comprised of 11 schools, had an enrollment of 6,216 students and 564.6 classroom teachers (on an FTE basis), for a student–teacher ratio of 11.0:1.

The district is classified by the New Jersey Department of Education as being in District Factor Group "I", the second-highest of eight groupings. District Factor Groups organize districts statewide to allow comparison by common socioeconomic characteristics of the local districts. From lowest socioeconomic status to highest, the categories are A, B, CD, DE, FG, GH, I and J.

Each school has a magnet theme, which becomes the focus of the school's teaching style. Students have "freedom of choice" as to which school they want to attend. School selection is not dictated based on location of residence within Montclair. When registering in the district, parents rank their school preferences from highest to lowest, with preferences given for siblings of existing students and special needs. School preferences are accommodated as long as space is available.

== History ==
In 1948, schools were racially integrated. One teacher was black.

== Awards and recognition ==
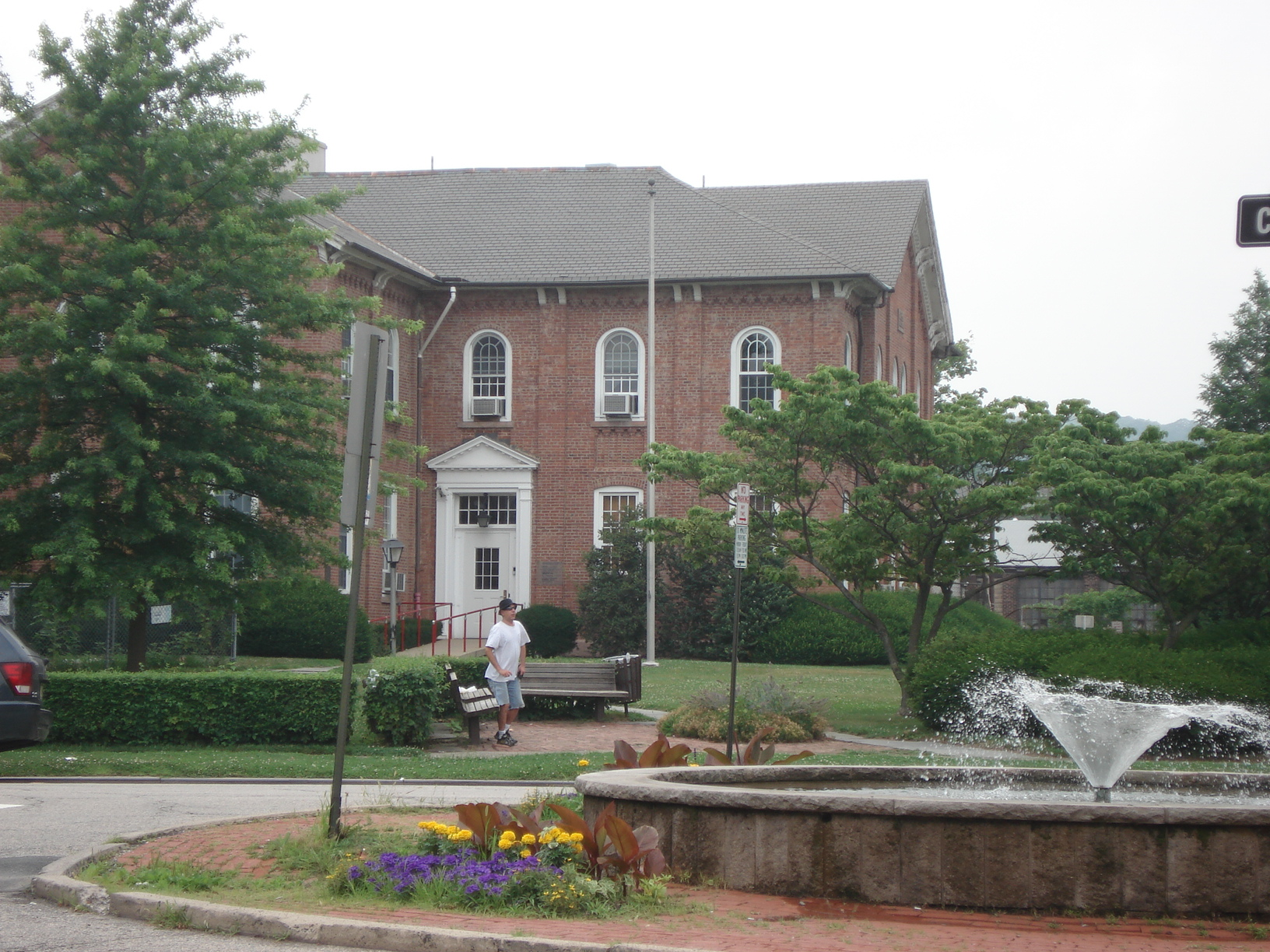
Board of Education

In both the 1989–90 and 1993-94 school years, Watchung School was recognized with the National Blue Ribbon Award of Excellence from the United States Department of Education, the highest honor that an American school can achieve. Hillside School was recognized as a Blue Ribbon School for the 1987-88 school year.

The district was awarded the New Jersey Governor's Award for Performance Excellence – Silver in 2005, was commended by the United States Department of Education as one of six exemplary magnet school programs in the nation, was recognized by The Wall Street Journal for its public schools, and was certified by the New Jersey Department of Education during the 2004-05 school year.

Montclair Public Schools was cited for its magnet school program, as one of six school districts nationwide selected as the focus of Innovations in Education: Creating Successful Magnet School Programs, describing those schools whose "successful magnet programs offer a range of contexts, experiences, and perspectives".

Nishuane School was named as a "Star School" by the New Jersey Department of Education, the highest honor that a New Jersey school can achieve, in the 1993-94 school year. Watchung School was also named a Star School for 1993-94.

== Schools ==
Schools in the district (with 2022–23 enrollment data from the National Center for Education Statistics) are:

Elementary schools

- Bradford Elementary School (375 students in grades K-5)
  - Frances A. Aboushi, principal
- Charles H. Bullock Elementary School (428, K-5)
  - Nami Kuwabara, principal
- Edgemont Elementary School (255, K-5)
  - Briony Carr-Clemente, principal
- Hillside Elementary School (581, 3-5)
  - Edwyn Acevedo, principal
- Nishuane Elementary School (412, PreK-2)
  - Frank Sedita, principal
- Northeast Elementary School (374, K-5)
  - Joseph Putrino, principal
- Watchung Elementary School (385, K-5)
  - Patrick Krenn, principal

Middle schools

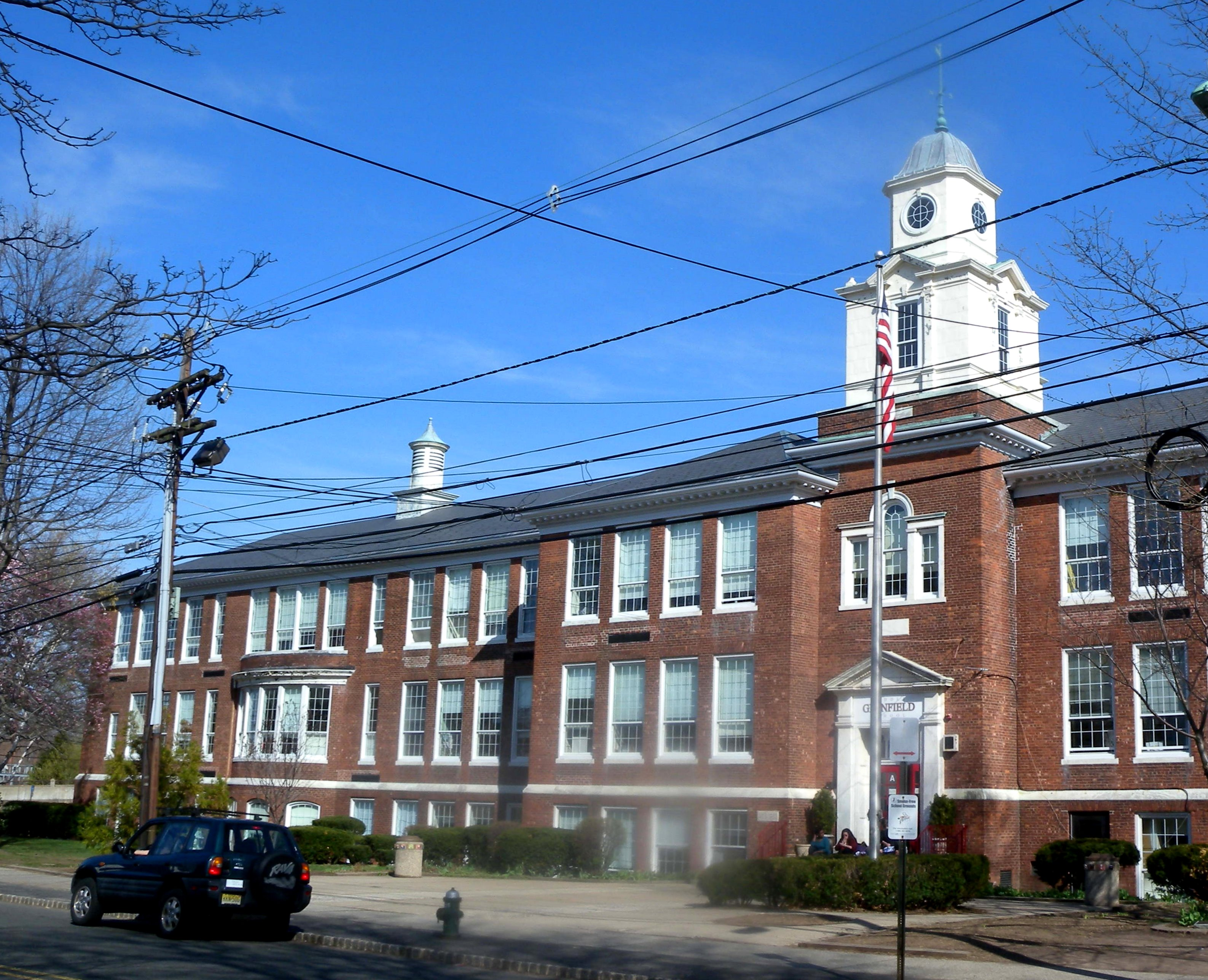
Glenfield School

- Buzz Aldrin Middle School (607, 6-8)
  - Major Jennings, principal
- Glenfield Middle School (521, 6-8)
  - Marco Vargas, interim principal

High school

- Montclair High School (1,961; 9-12)
  - Jeffrey A. Freeman, principal

=== Former schools ===
- Grove Street Elementary School
- Southwest Elementary School
- George Inness Middle School
- Renaissance Middle School at the Rand Building was closed at the end of the 2025-26 school year as part of cost-saving measures.

== Administration ==
Core members of the district's administration are:

- Damon Cooper, interim superintendent of schools
- Christina Hunt, board secretary and school business administrator

== Board of education ==
The district's board of education, comprised of nine members, sets policy and oversees the fiscal and educational operation of the district through its administration. As a Type II school district, the board's trustees are elected directly by voters to serve three-year terms of office on a staggered basis, with three seats up for election each year held (since 2022) as part of the November general election. The board appoints a superintendent to oversee the district's day-to-day operations and a business administrator to supervise the business functions of the district. As a Type I school district until 2021, the board had seven trustees who had been appointed by the mayor to serve three-year terms of office on a staggered basis, with either two or three members up for reappointment each year. Of the more than 600 school districts statewide, Montclair was one of 15 districts with appointed school boards.

In 2009, voters rejected a referendum proposal that would have switched the district from a Type I (appointed) to a Type II (elected) board. In a 2020 referendum, after five separate times when voters supported retaining the Type I / mayoral appointment system, voters approved the switch to a Type II / elected board by a more than two-to-one margin. The change to an elected board meant that the size of the board increased to nine seats. In a March 2022 special election, voters elected two candidates to fill those added seats that will expire in December 2023, with three seats up for election each November as part of the general election, starting in 2022.

== Elementary schools gallery ==
Elementary Schools

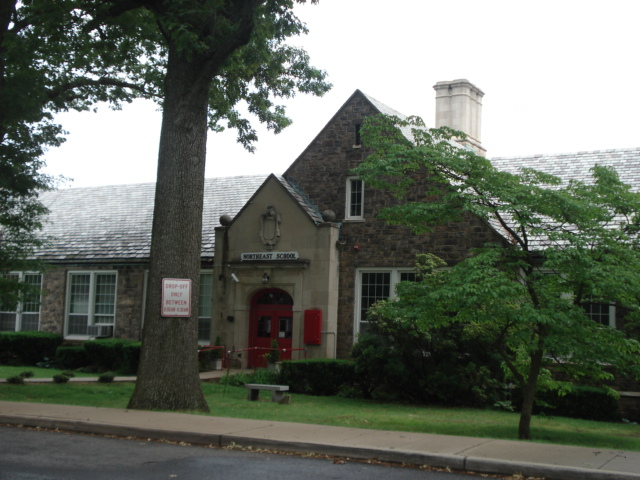
Northeast Elementary School

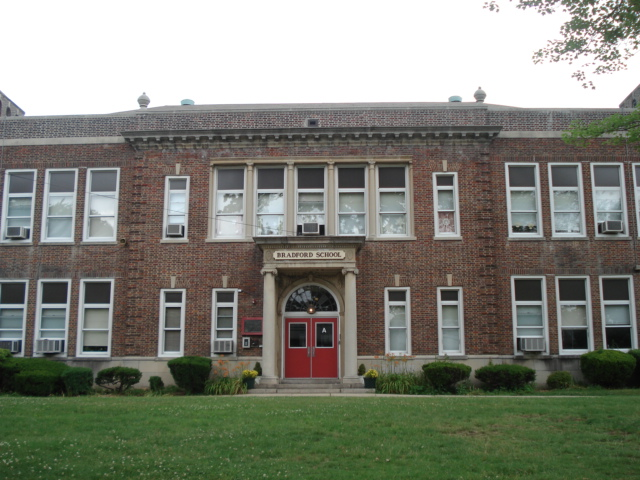
Bradford Elementary School

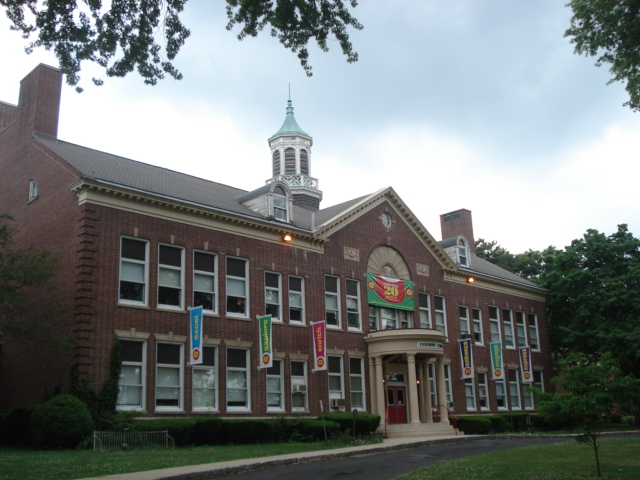
Edgemont Elementary School

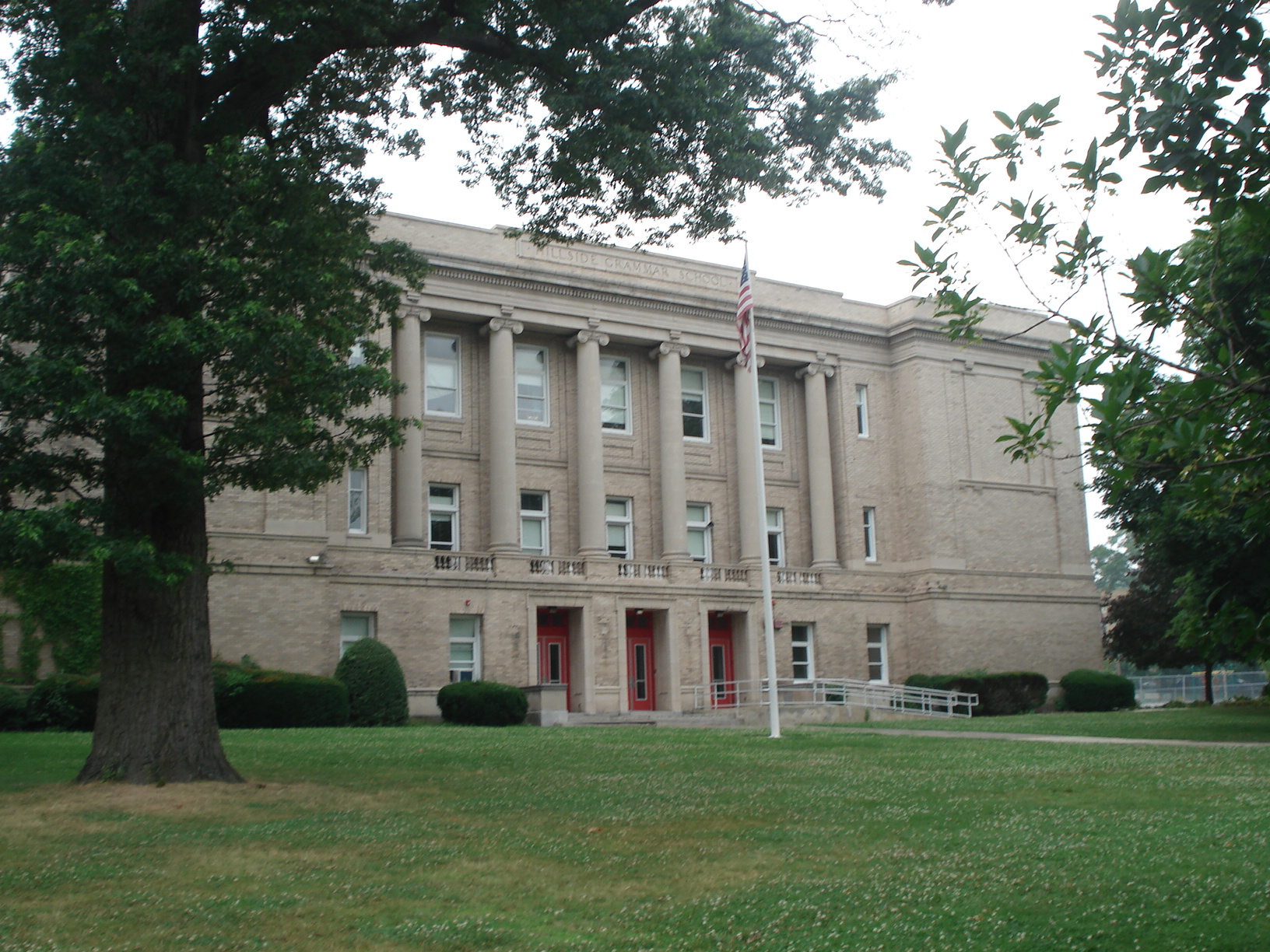
Hillside Elementary School

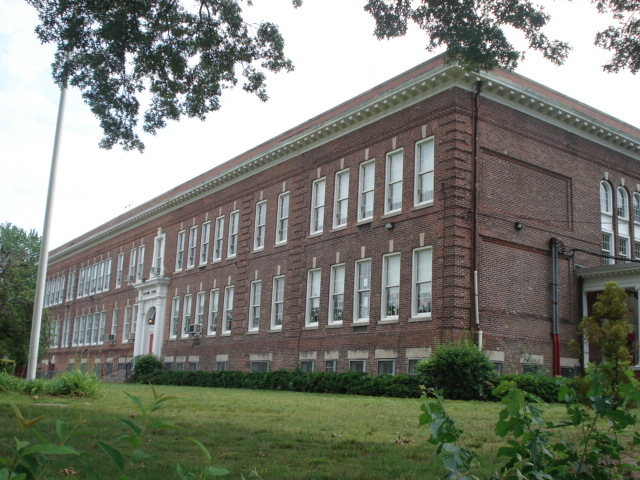
Watchung Elementary School

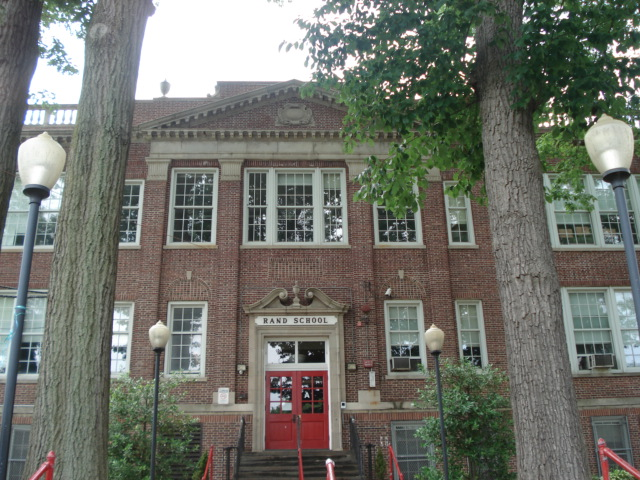
Previous Rand Elementary School, now Renaissance at Rand Middle School

== Middle schools gallery ==
Middle Schools

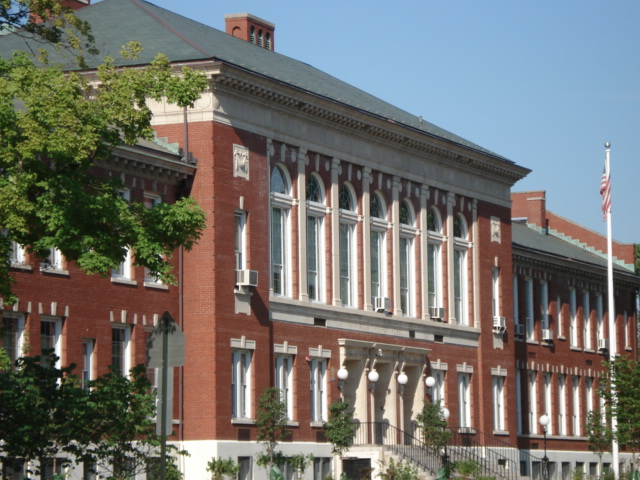
Buzz Aldrin Middle School

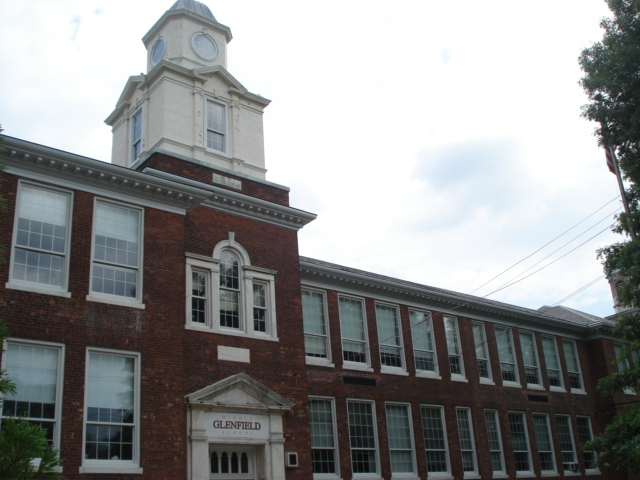
Glenfield Middle School

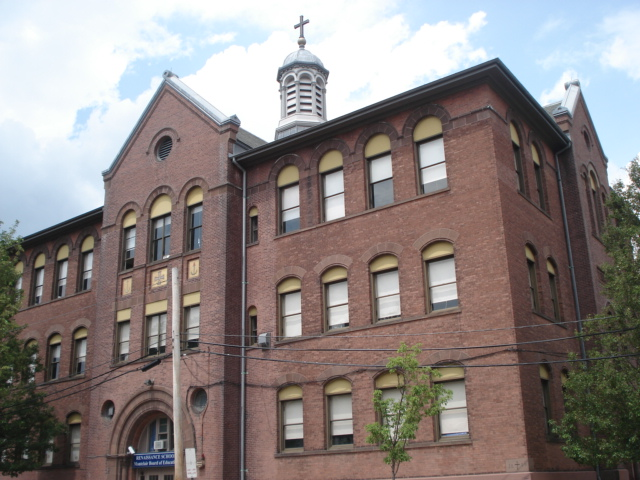
Renaissance Middle School's previous building, owned by Immaculate Conception
