= Vacchiano Farm =

American winery located in New Jersey

- Location: 135 Port Colden Road, Washington, New Jersey, U.S.
- Coordinates: 40.771410°N 74.960093°W
- Appellation: Warren Hills AVA
- First vines planted: 2004
- Opened to the public: 2009
- Key people
- Area cultivated: 11
- Cases/yr: 2,500 (2013)
- Other products: Breads, cheeses, fruits, meats, pies, sauces, vegetables
- Distribution: NJ farmers' markets
- Tasting: No tasting room
- Website: http://www.vacchianofarm.com

Vacchiano Farm is a winery in the Port Colden section of Washington Township in Warren County, New Jersey, United States. A family produce and livestock farm since 1983, the vineyard was first planted in 2004, and began to sell its wine in 2009. Vacchiano has 11 acres of grapes under cultivation, and produces 2,500 cases of wine per year.

== Wines and other products ==
Vacchiano Farm is in the Warren Hills AVA, and produces red and white wines from American hybrid grapes. Vacchiano also makes and sells breads, cheeses, fruits, meats, pies, sauces, and vegetables.

== Licensing, associations, and distribution ==
Vacchiano has a plenary winery license from the New Jersey Division of Alcoholic Beverage Control, which allows it to produce an unrestricted amount of wine, operate up to 15 off-premises sales rooms, and ship up to 12 cases per year to consumers in-state or out-of-state. The winery is not a member of the Garden State Wine Growers Association. Vacchiano does not have a tasting room, but distributes their wines and other products at farmers' markets in New Jersey.

== See also ==
- Alcohol laws of New Jersey
- American wine
- Judgment of Princeton
- List of wineries, breweries, and distilleries in New Jersey
- New Jersey Farm Winery Act
- New Jersey Wine Industry Advisory Council
- New Jersey wine
