= Warren Hills AVA =

American Viticultural Area in New Jersey

Coordinates: 40°36′51″N 75°09′47″W

Warren Hills
- Wine region
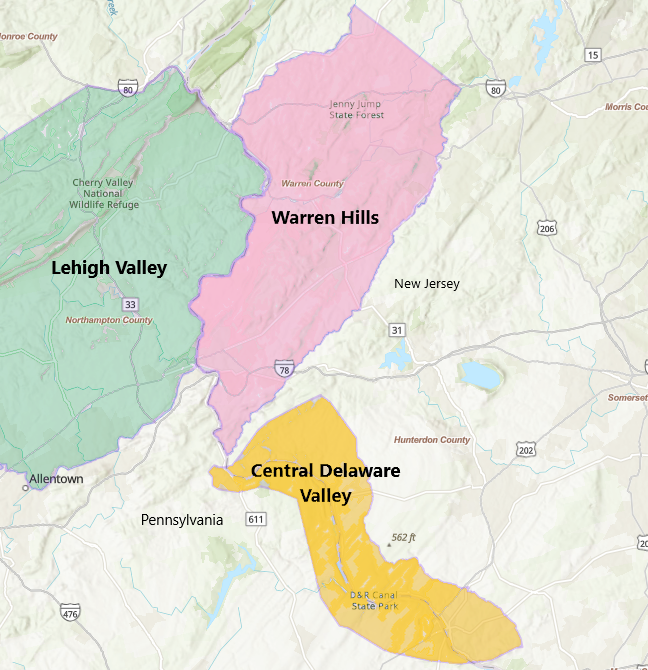
- Type: American Viticultural Area
- Year established: 1988
- Country: United States
- Part of: New Jersey
- Other regions in New Jersey: Central Delaware Valley AVA, Outer Coastal Plain AVA, Cape May Peninsula AVA
- Growing season: 175 days
- Climate region: Region II
- Heat units: 2,680 GDD units
- Precipitation (annual average): 24 in (610 mm)
- Soil conditions: limestone bedrock with deep, fertile, well-drained Washington and Hazen loams
- Total area: 144,640 acres (226 sq mi)
- Size of planted vineyards: 100 acres (40 ha)
- No. of vineyards: 5
- Grapes produced: Cabernet Franc, Cayuga, Chardonnay, Léon Millot, Pinot Noir, Seyval Blanc
- No. of wineries: 5

Warren Hills is an American Viticultural Area (AVA) located in northwestern New Jersey, entirely within Warren County encompassing most of the county, excluding the northwestern portion adjacent to Sussex County. It was established as the nation's 101^{st} and the state's second wine appellation on August 8, 1988 by the Bureau of Alcohol, Tobacco and Firearms (ATF), Treasury after reviewing a petition prepared by Mr. Rudolf Marchesi of Alba Vineyard and submitted on behalf of Warren County wineries and grape growers, namely Alba Vineyard, Marble Mountain Vineyards, Four Sisters Winery, Tamuzza Vineyards, and individual grower Mr. Daniel Campanelli, proposing a viticultural area named "Warren Hills."
The region includes several small valleys formed by tributaries of the Delaware River. The valleys drain from northeast to southwest, and most vineyards in the area are planted on southeast-facing hillsides. The AVA boundaries are along the junction of the Delaware River and the Musconetcong River, at the southern tip of Warren County and proceed northeastward along the Musconetcong River about 32 mi (51 km) to the point where it intersects the Warren County-Sussex County line. Then it follows northwestward along that county line for about 10 mi (16 km) to Paulins Kill, then generally southwestward along Paulins Kill to the Delaware River. The region's outline completes south-southwestward along the Delaware River. Warren Hills forms the northeast edge of the Pennsylvania landform, the Lehigh Valley, resident to Lehigh Valley AVA. The region is primarily planted with French hybrid grapes.

== History ==
The name "Warren Hills" derives from Warren County and from the area's topography. The county was named in the early nineteenth century after a local resident Revolutionary War patriot who died at the Battle of Bunker Hill.

== Terroir ==
=== Topography ===
Geographically, the "Warren Hills" area consists of a series of narrow, parallel valleys formed by tributaries of the Delaware River. The petitioner submitted evidence that the area is distinguished from surrounding areas by soil, topography, and climatic conditions. Topography also forms a basis for the northwestern and southeastern boundaries of the "Warren Hills." The northwestern boundary marks the beginning of a more mountainous area: Kittatinny Mountain, a member of the Pocono chain. Similarly, the southeastern boundary of the new viticultural area marks the division between two geological regions of New Jersey: The "Upland Valley" region (in which the "Warren Hills" lie) and the "Piedmont" region. The Piedmont's rolling hills contrast with the straight, narrow valleys of the "Warren Hills." The farmland across the Delaware River lies mostly in a single broad valley (the Lehigh Valley): whereas the "Warren Hills" area contains about five narrower valleys. Those valleys run southwest to northeast; consequently, in the "Warren Hills" there are numerous south-facing or southeast-facing hillsides, which make the best vineyard sites. More direct exposure to sunlight creates microclimates with warmer than average temperatures, especially in winter. Further, the valleys of the "Warren Hills" create a desirable air drainage situation, in which cool air drains downward, away from the hillside vineyards. This feature is important in the spring and fall, when there may be a danger of untimely frost.

=== Climate ===
Warren Hills viticultural area is also contrasted with surrounding areas on the basis of climate. In particular, the eastern boundary of the area lies where the growing season drops off to less than 150 days. Inside the area, according to the petitioner's evidence, the growing season "averages 175 frost-free days, but is often longer on selected sites." This difference is significant for viticulture, because it means that certain late-ripining varieties, such as Vidal Blanc, Seyval Blanc, and Cabernet Sauvignon, could not be grown in the area to the east. Some of the climatic features that affect viticulture in the "Warren Hills" are directly caused by the area's unique topography. Specifically, the combination of sunny microclimates on the southward-facing vineyard slopes, together with the funneling of prevailing winds by the long, narrow valleys, results in warm days and cool nights during the growing season. It has a hot-summer humid continental climate (Dfa) and is located in hardiness zones 6b and 7a.

=== Soils ===
According to the petitioner, the "Warren Hills" soils are less acidic than those of some surrounding areas, "due to the nature of the bedrock." He explained that "The vineyard soils of the Warren Hills region are formed from Dolomitic Limestone which has a high concentration of calcium and magnesium," but that the soils of surrounding areas "are formed from shale and other sources." The relative pH values of vineyard soils within and to the north of the area are contrasted as follows: The higher pH values of the "Warren Hills" soils indicate less acidity. Those values show that "Warren Hills" vineyard soils range from moderately acidic to slightly alkaline. Soils to the north and to the south are more acidic. Typical vineyard soils in the Central Delaware Valley viticultural area (south of the "Warren Hills") have been described, in soil surveys published by the U.S. Department of Agriculture, as: "Natural reaction is strongly acid," and "Natural reaction ranges from medium acid to strongly acid." The soils to the northeast of the viticultural area are also distinguishable. The northeastern boundary of the area corresponds generally to the terminal morraine of a glacial advance known as the "Wisconsin." According to the petitioner, there was once a large glacier, which covered the land to the northeast of the area but did not extend into the area itself. When the glacier receded, it left behind some glacial deposits, which became mixed with the native soil, rendering it less suitable for viticulture. By contrast, the "Warren Hills" soil generally does not contain such glacial deposits. Westward, across the Delaware River, limestone soils like those of the "Warren Hills" reappear. However, the petitioner has indicated that they are less prominent there, and further, that the topography of that region is significantly different, so that the Delaware River does form a proper boundary, despite the similarity of soils.

== Wineries ==
As of 2019, there are 5 Warren Hills wineries.

- Alba Vineyard in Finesville
- Brook Hollow Winery in Columbia
- Four Sisters Winery in White Township
- Vacchiano Farm in Washington
- Villa Milagro Vineyards in Finesville

== See also ==
- Alcohol laws of New Jersey
- Garden State Wine Growers Association
- Judgment of Princeton
- List of wineries, breweries, and distilleries in New Jersey
- New Jersey Farm Winery Act
- New Jersey wine
- New Jersey Wine Industry Advisory Council
