= Four Sisters Winery =

American winery located in New Jersey

Coordinates: 40.86322°N 75.01464°W

- Location: 783 County Route 519, Belvidere, New Jersey, U.S.
- Coordinates: 40.86322 N, 75.01464 W
- Appellation: Warren Hills AVA
- First vines planted: 1981
- Opened to the public: 1984
- Key people: Matty and Laurie Matarazzo (owners)
- Acres cultivated: 8
- Cases/yr: 5,000 (2011)
- Other attractions: Apple picking, pumpkin picking, corn mazes, bakery, picnicking permitted, pet-friendly
- Distribution: On-site, wine festivals, NJ liquor stores, NJ outlet stores, home shipment
- Tasting: Tastings daily except Wednesday, tours on weekends
- Website: http://www.foursisterswinery.com/

Four Sisters Winery at Matarazzo Farm is a winery in White Township (mailing address is Belvidere) in Warren County, New Jersey. A family produce farm since 1921, the vineyard was first planted in 1981, and opened to the public in 1984. It is the third oldest winery in New Jersey. Four Sisters has 8 acres of grapes under cultivation, and produces 5,000 cases of wine per year. The winery is so named because its owners have four daughters.

== History ==
The winery was started in 1981 by fruit and vegetable farmers Robert "Matty" Matarazzo and his wife Laurie Matarazzo, to earn additional income to pay for their four daughters' college education. Founded by immigrants from Italy in 1921, Matarazzo Farm was once known for its strawberry patches, which attracted up to 11,000 visitors during the harvest.

To learn the trade, Laurie apprenticed with Nathan Stackhouse, who was based in South Jersey and had a master's degree in wine-making, while Matty consulted wine growers in Sonoma County, California. The couple invested heavily in building the winery and acquiring equipment from Italy, and soon, wine-making became the main focus of their business. Their first harvest was in 1984, and by 2003, they were producing 12,000 gallons of wine a year and had 23 flavors. Laurie eventually retired and became an Episcopal priest, while Matty continued to run the business with four full-time managers and ten part-time staff.

The winery also hosts monthly events such as wine-tasting and barefoot grape-stomping, and has participated in New Jersey wine festivals each year in September. Each of the eponymous four sisters have had wines named after them, but reportedly have no interest in taking over the business. Matarazzo Farm continues to operate its apple and pumpkin orchards in addition to the winery.

== Wines ==
Four Sisters Winery is located in the Warren Hills AVA, and produces wine from Baco noir, Catawba, Cayuga White, Chambourcin, Concord, Delaware, Frontenac, Léon Millot, Marechal Foch, Marquette, Niagara, Seyval blanc, Traminette, and Vidal blanc grapes. Four Sisters also makes fruit wines from apples, blueberries, cherries, pumpkins, raspberries, and strawberries. It is the only winery in New Jersey that produces wine from Delaware, Léon Millot, and Marquette, which are red hybrid grapes known for their tolerance of cold weather.

== Features, licensing, associations, and outlets ==
During the autumn harvest season, the winery offers apple picking, pumpkin picking, and corn mazes, and operates a bakery that sells pies and other food. Four Sisters has a plenary winery license from the New Jersey Division of Alcoholic Beverage Control, which allows it to produce an unrestricted amount of wine, operate up to 15 off-premises sales rooms, and ship up to 12 cases per year to consumers in-state or out-of-state. Four Sisters is a member of the Garden State Wine Growers Association and its subsidiary, Vintage North Jersey. The winery operates outlet stores in two New Jersey towns – Morristown and Phillipsburg.

== See also ==
- Alcohol laws of New Jersey
- American wine
- Judgment of Princeton
- List of wineries, breweries, and distilleries in New Jersey
- New Jersey Farm Winery Act
- New Jersey Wine Industry Advisory Council
- New Jersey wine
