= Alba Vineyard =

American winery located in New Jersey

Coordinates: 40.614637°N 75.165496°W

- Location: 269 Route 627, Finesville, New Jersey, U.S.
- Coordinates: 40.614637 N, 75.165496 W
- Appellation: Warren Hills AVA
- First vines planted: 1980
- Opened to the public: 1982
- Key people: Rudolph Marchesi (founder); Tom Sharko (owner); John Altmaier (winemaker)
- Acres cultivated: 42
- Cases/yr: 11,000 (2011)
- Other attractions: Picnicking permitted
- Distribution: On-site, NJ liquor stores, home shipment
- Tasting: Daily tastings, tours on weekends
- Website: http://www.albavineyard.com/

Alba Vineyard is an American winery in the Finesville section of Pohatcong Township in Warren County, New Jersey. Formerly a dairy farm, the vineyard was first planted in 1980, and opened to the public in 1982. Alba is one of the larger winegrowers in New Jersey, having 42 acres of grapes under cultivation, and producing 11,000 cases of wine per year. The winery is named for the Italian word alba which means "dawn," the time of day when the original owner first conceived of producing wine.

== Wines ==
Alba Vineyard is in the Warren Hills AVA, and produces wine from Barbera, Cabernet Franc, Cabernet Sauvignon, Cayuga White, Chambourcin, Chardonnay, Gewürztraminer, Malbec, Merlot, Pinot noir, Riesling, Syrah, and Vidal blanc grapes.

== Advocacy, licensing, and associations ==
The winery is an advocate of New Jersey's three-tier alcohol distribution system, wherein wineries sell to wholesalers and retailers rather than directly to consumers. Alba has a plenary winery license from the New Jersey Division of Alcoholic Beverage Control, which allows it to produce an unrestricted amount of wine, operate up to 15 off-premises sales rooms, and ship up to 12 cases per year to consumers in-state or out-of-state. Alba is not a member of the Garden State Wine Growers Association.

== Controversy ==
Alba has had conflicts with nearby residents regarding noise from the use of cannons. The cannons are discharged regularly during the autumn in order to keep birds away from the crops. The New Jersey Department of Environmental Protection has attempted to mediate a resolution between Alba and its neighbors.

== See also ==
- Alcohol laws of New Jersey
- American wine
- Judgment of Princeton
- List of wineries, breweries, and distilleries in New Jersey
- New Jersey Farm Winery Act
- New Jersey Wine Industry Advisory Council
- New Jersey wine
