= Villa Milagro Vineyards =

American winery located in New Jersey

Coordinates: 40.596326°N 75.185999°W

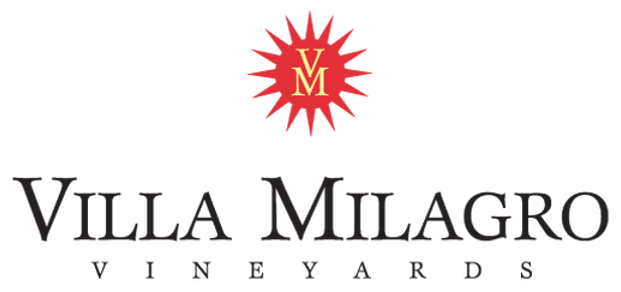
- Location: 33 Warren Glen Road, Finesville, New Jersey, U.S.
- Coordinates: 40.596326 N, 75.185999 W
- Appellation: Warren Hills AVA
- First vines planted: 2003
- Opened to the public: 2007
- Key people: Steve & Audrey Gambino (owners)
- Area cultivated: 11
- Cases/yr: 1,500 (2012)
- Other attractions: Tourist train, picnicking permitted
- Distribution: On-site, NJ farmers' markets, NJ restaurants, home shipment
- Tasting: Tastings on weekends
- Website: villamilagrovineyards.com

Villa Milagro Vineyards is a winery in the Finesville section of Pohatcong Township in Warren County, New Jersey. The vineyard was first planted in 2003, and opened to the public in 2007. Villa Milagro has 11 acres of grapes under cultivation, and produces 1,500 cases of wine per year. The winery is named for the Spanish words villa milagro which mean "house of miracles," because of the green mountain scenery of the farm.

== Wines ==
Villa Milagro Vineyards is located in the Warren Hills AVA, and produces wines from Cabernet Franc, Cabernet Sauvignon, Chardonnay, Frontenac, Muscat blanc, Malbec, Merlot, Norton (Cynthiana), Pinot gris, Sangiovese, Syrah, Vidal blanc, and Villard blanc grapes. Villa Milagro is the only organic winery in New Jersey.

== Advocacy, features, licensing, and associations ==
Villa Milagro is an advocate of the direct shipping of wine from wineries to customers. There is a tourist train from Phillipsburg to the vineyard on weekends from May to October. Villa Milagro has a plenary winery license from the New Jersey Division of Alcoholic Beverage Control, which allows it to produce an unrestricted amount of wine, operate up to 15 off-premises sales rooms, and ship up to 12 cases per year to consumers in-state or out-of-state. The winery is a member of the Garden State Wine Growers Association and its subsidiary, Vintage North Jersey.

== See also ==
- Alcohol laws of New Jersey
- American wine
- Judgment of Princeton
- List of wineries, breweries, and distilleries in New Jersey
- New Jersey Farm Winery Act
- New Jersey Wine Industry Advisory Council
- New Jersey wine
