= Nassau Valley Vineyards =

Coordinates: 38.747°N 75.190°W

- Location: Lewes, Delaware, US
- Founded: 1993
- Key people: Peggy Raley
- Tasting: Open to Public
- Website: https://www.nassauvalley.com/

Nassau Valley Vineyards was the first winery in the state of Delaware in the United States, and is currently the largest in the state. When jazz singer Peggy Raley decided to open a winery in Delaware, she first had to get the local state legislature to pass a law allowing wineries in the state. By 1991 she drafted the necessary legislation, and she obtained a license and opened the vineyard in 1993. Until October 2007, when Pizzadili Winery opened, it was the first and only winery in the state. There are eight acres of property at the site, and it caters to the beach-bound tourist traffic in the area.

== History ==
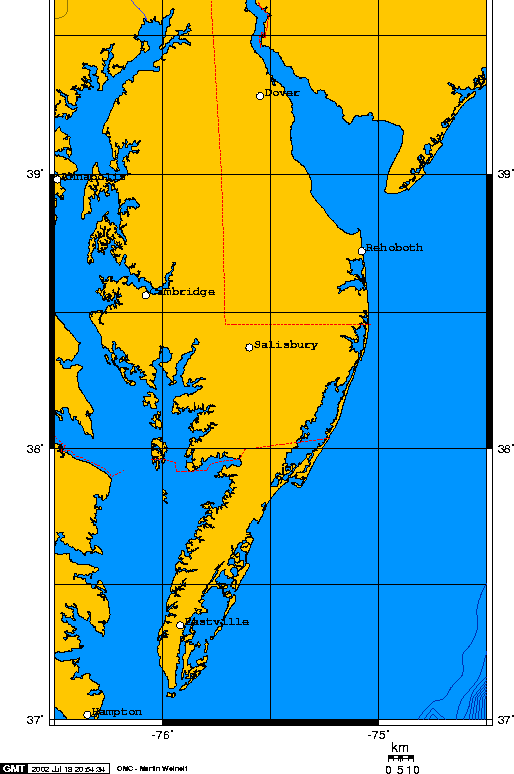
The Delmarva Peninsula (with modern-day Delaware outlined in red) which was first cultivated for viticulture by Swedish and Dutch settlers.

Nassau Valley Vineyards is a pioneer in the modern Delaware wine industry, helping to resurrect the industry in the late 20th century. Prior to the winery's foundation, the history of viticulture in Delaware was sporadic. In the 1630s, the Swedes encouraged their New Sweden settlers in the Delaware River valley to plant grapevines and produce wine that could possibly be exported back to Sweden, a country with little native viticulture of its own. When the Dutch took over the area in the mid 17th century and renamed it New Netherland, they similarly promoted viticulture in the area but found the area more suited for apple orchards. From then on, viticulture and winemaking in Delaware was mostly confined to home winemaking until the late 20th century when Nassau Valley Vineyards opened up the first commercial winery in the state.

In the 1980s, Peggy Raley was working for Les Amis du Vin International (a wine appreciation organization) and "The Friends of Wine Magazine". Throughout her travels in wine regions across the globe, she became convinced of the viticultural potential in her native state of Delaware. Between 1987 and 1990, she planted 7 acres (2.83 hectares) of grapes. At the time Delaware state laws left over from the Prohibition in the United States prevented the possibility of Raley opening a winery from which she could sell wines to consumers. Raley began a campaign to change these laws, lobbying the state legislature and even drafting the 1991 legislation, herself, that was ultimately passed and signed into law. In 1993, Nassau Valley Vineyards was finally permitted to sell Delaware wine as the state's first commercial winery.

== Location and production ==
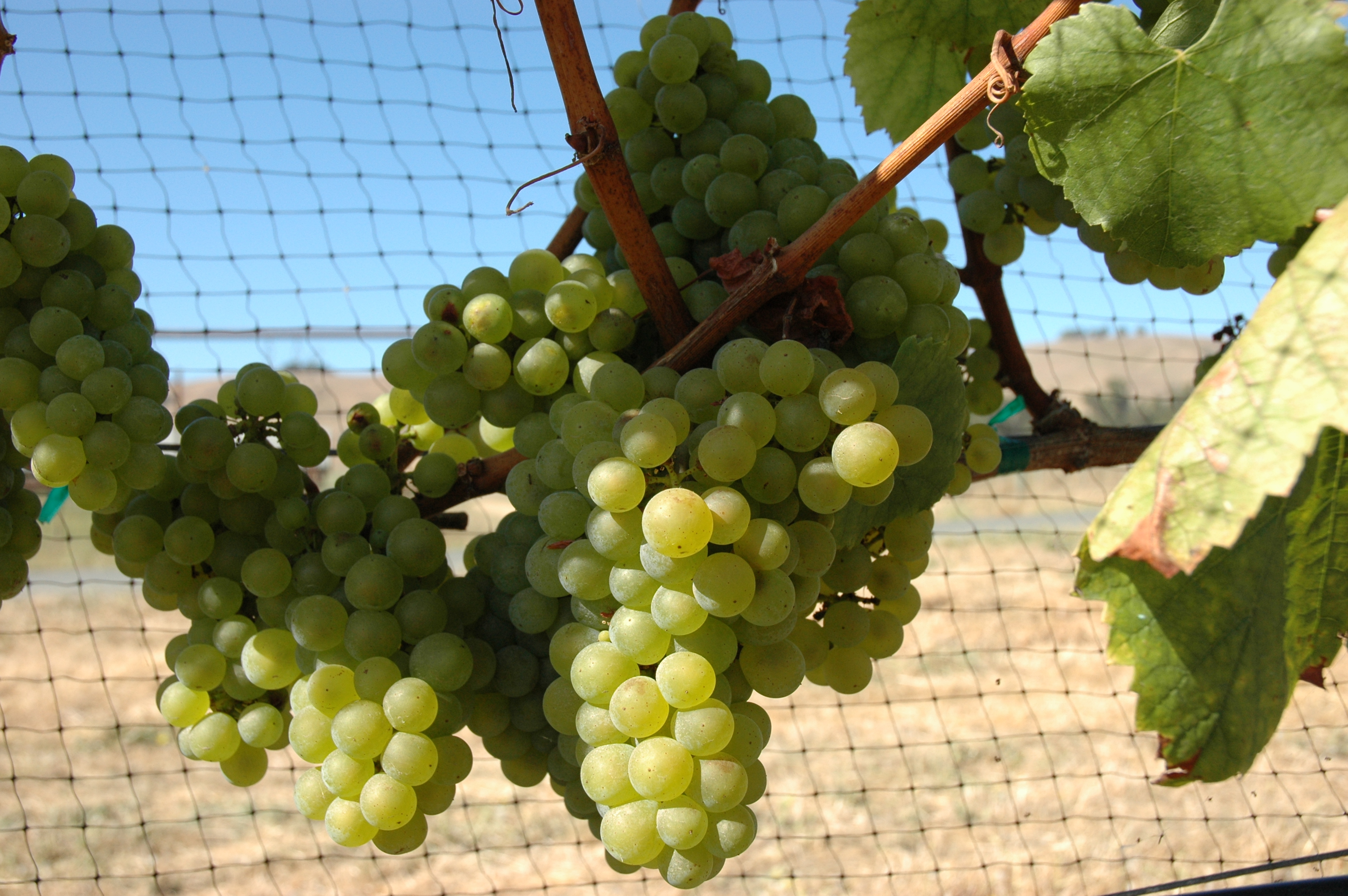
Chardonnay is among the grape varieties currently produced at Nassau Valley Vineyards.

As of July 2009, Nassau Valley Vineyards was the only winery in Delaware to produce estate grown wine, meaning that they grow the grapes on their own property and produce the wine at a winemaking facility located on the same estate. The vineyard is located 3 miles (4.82 km) from Cape Henlopen on the Atlantic coast. The maritime climate of the region and its Atlantic influence reminded Raley of Bordeaux, which led her to initially plant the Bordeaux grape varieties of Cabernet Sauvignon, Merlot and Cabernet Franc. Later expansion of the vineyards brought plantings of Chardonnay, Seyval blanc and Chambourcin.

By 2005, Nassau Valley Vineyards produced around 5,000 cases of wine each year. In addition to their estate Delaware wines, the winery also produces wines from purchased grapes grown in Maryland and Virginia.
