= Seigle Homestead =

- U.S. National Register of Historic Places
- U.S. Historic district – Contributing property
- New Jersey Register of Historic Places
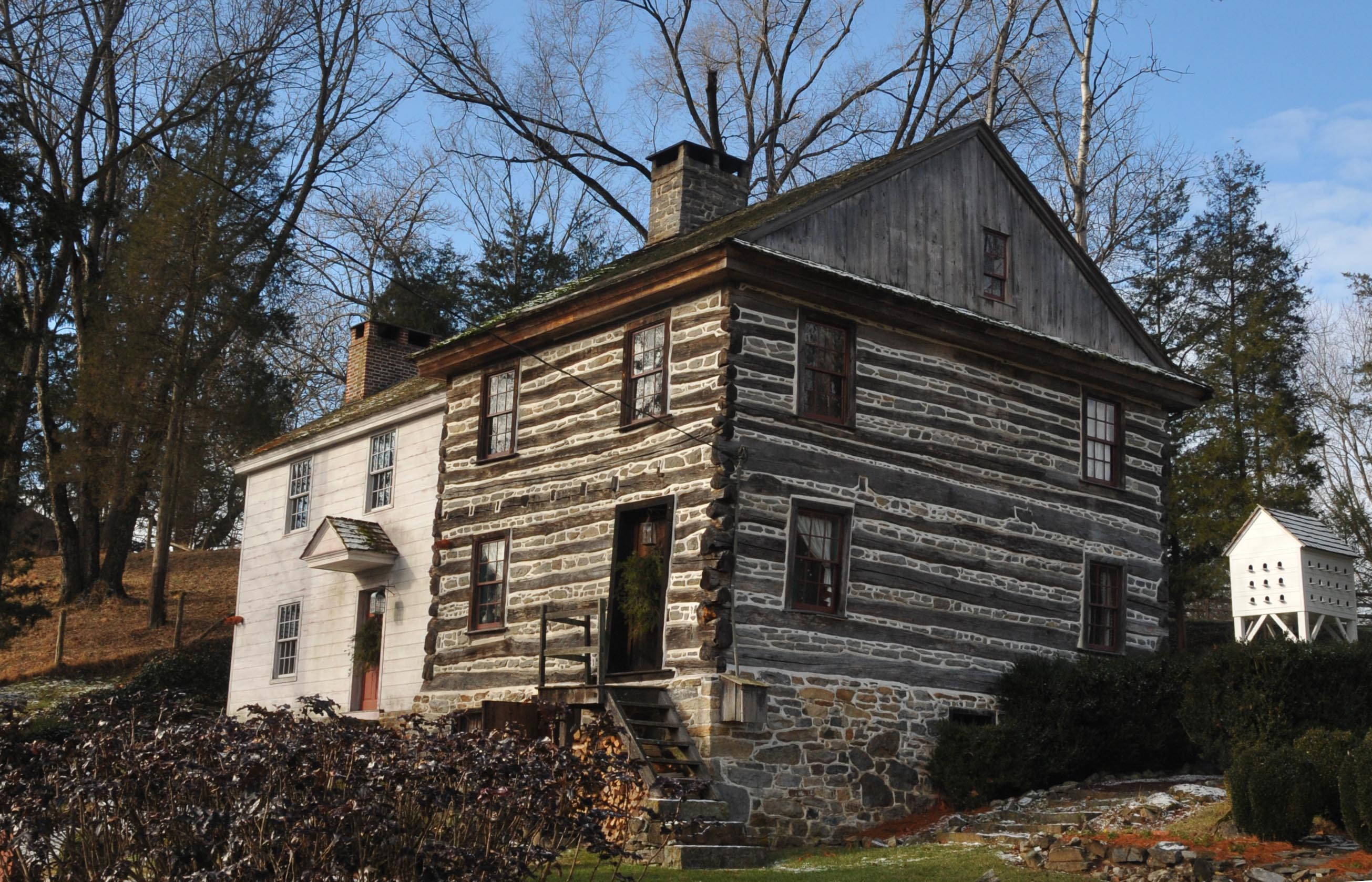

- Location within Warren County, New Jersey Location within New Jersey Location within the United States
- Location: Riegelsville-Warren Glen Road, Finesville, New Jersey
- Coordinates: 40°36′43″N 75°09′54″W
- Area: 1 acre (0.40 ha)
- Built: c. 1793
- Architectural style: Log House
- Part of: Finesville–Seigletown Historic District (ID10000892)
- NRHP reference No.: 77000918
- NJRHP No.: 2792

Significant dates
- Added to NRHP: November 7, 1977
- Designated CP: November 10, 2010
- Designated NJRHP: January 10, 1977

The Seigle Homestead is a historic house built around 1793 and located along Riegelsville-Warren Glen Road in the Finesville section of Pohatcong Township, the only surviving two-story log house in Warren County, New Jersey. It was added to the National Register of Historic Places on November 7, 1977, for its significance in architecture and social history. The log house was listed as a contributing property of the Finesville–Seigletown Historic District on November 10, 2010.

== History and description ==
The log house was built by members of the Benjamin Seigle family around 1793. The area around it had a mill, pottery, and store operated by the family. The hamlet became known as Seigletown.

== See also ==
- National Register of Historic Places listings in Warren County, New Jersey
