= Finesville, New Jersey =

Populated place in Warren County, New Jersey, US

- Census-designated place
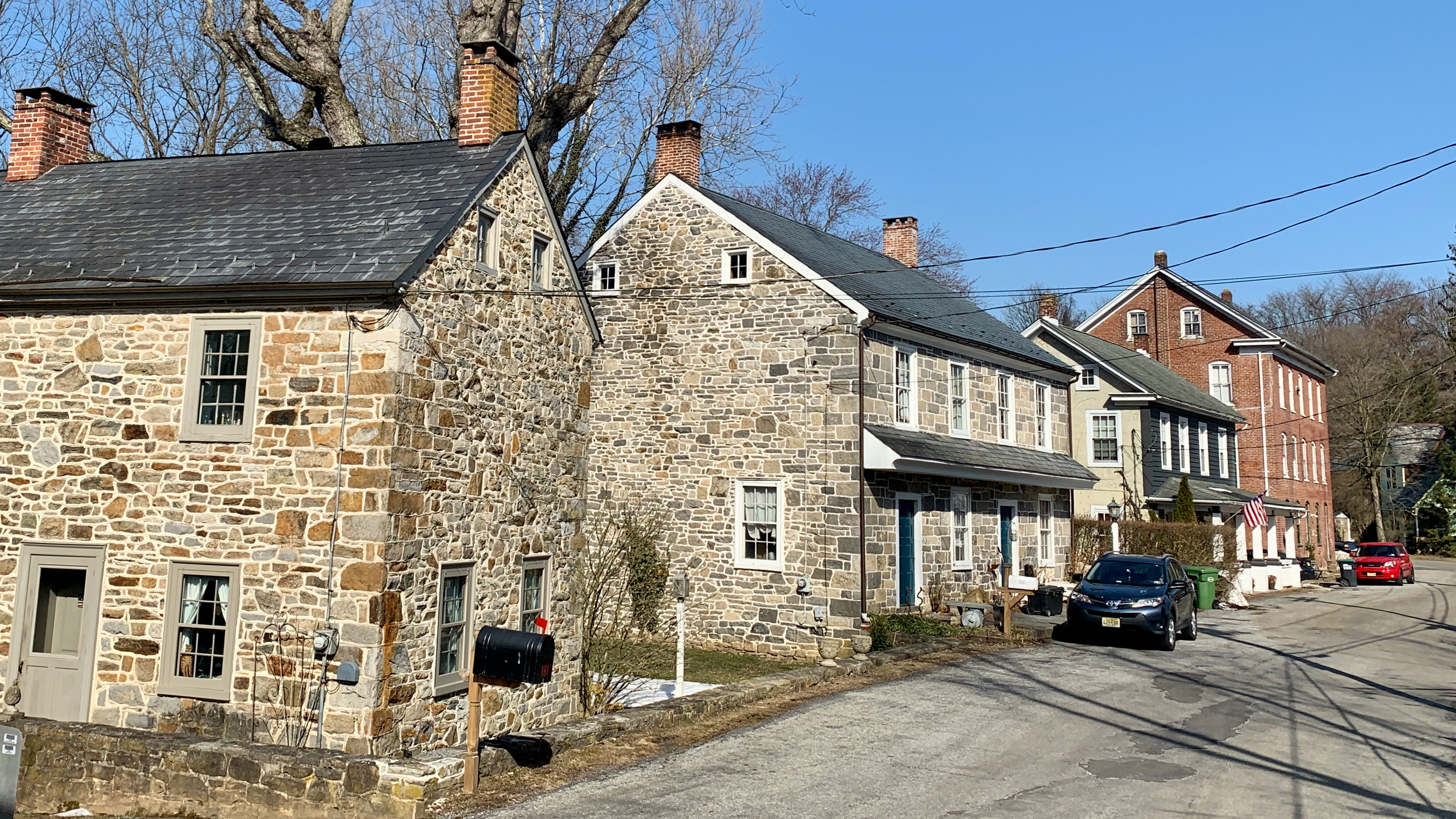
- Stone houses on Mount Joy Road

- Location in Warren County Location in New Jersey Location in the United States
- Coordinates: 40°36′30″N 75°10′16″W
- Country: United States
- State: New Jersey
- County: Warren
- Township: Pohatcong
- Named for: Philip and John Fein

Area
  - Total: 2.19 sq mi (5.68 km^{2})
  - Land: 2.12 sq mi (5.48 km^{2})
  - Water: 0.077 sq mi (0.20 km^{2}) 0.00%
- Elevation: 260 ft (80 m)

Population (2020)
  - Total: 364
  - Density: 171.9/sq mi (66.39/km^{2})
- Time zone: UTC−05:00 (Eastern (EST))
  - Summer (DST): UTC−04:00 (EDT)
- Area code: 908
- FIPS code: 34-23340
- GNIS feature ID: 876338; 2583989

Finesville is an unincorporated community and census-designated place (CDP) located within Pohatcong Township in Warren County, in the U.S. state of New Jersey. The CDP was defined as part of the 2010 United States census. As of the 2020 census, Finesville had a population of 364.

== History ==
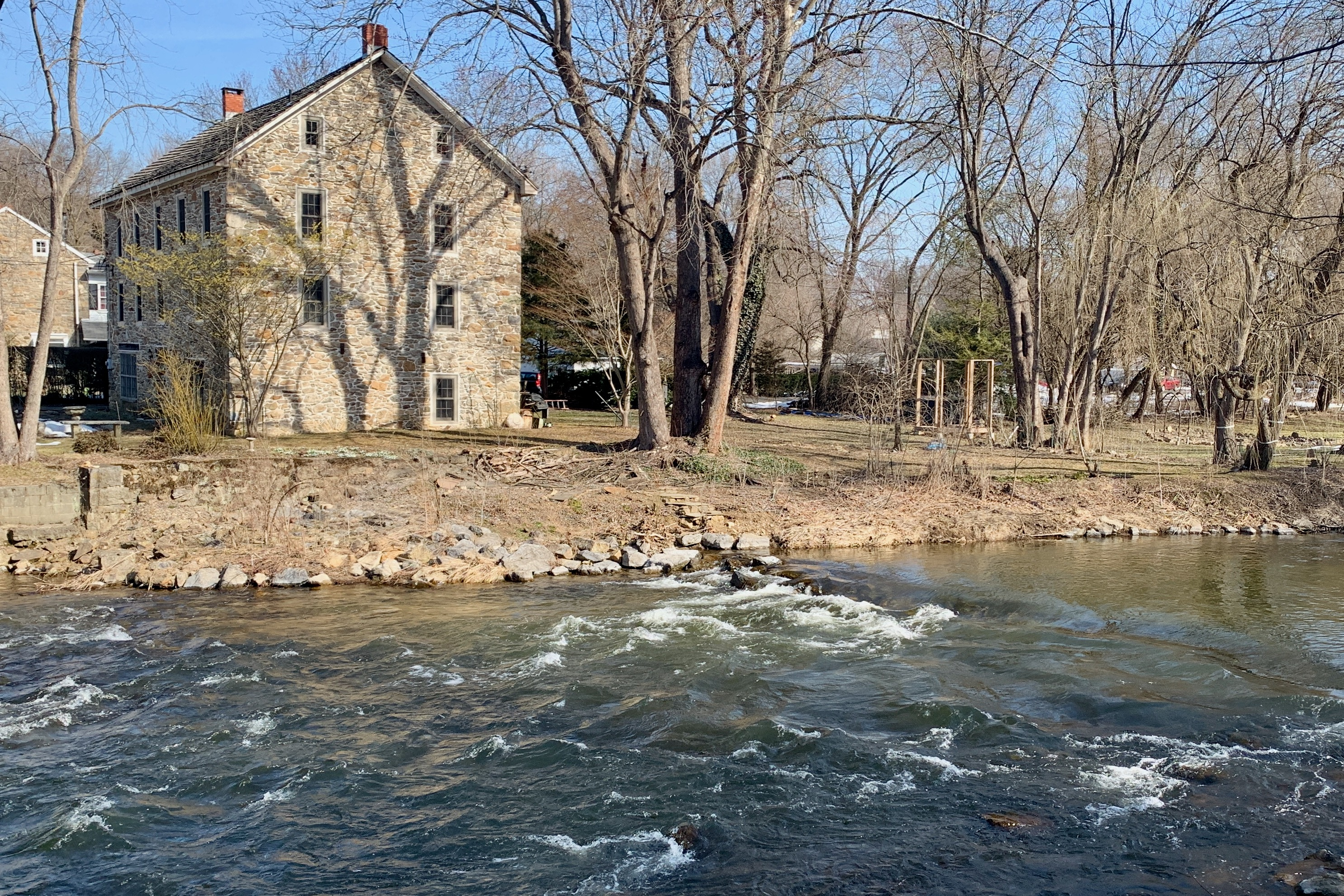
Former woolen mill by the remains of the Finesville Dam

The community is located along the Musconetcong River between Pohatcong Mountain and Musconetcong Mountain, about a mile east of the Delaware River in a section of the Musconetcong Valley called the Musconetcong Gorge. The settlement was named for Philip and John Fein (often misspelled Fine by locals) who settled in the area from Germany. They built a dam and ran an oil mill, gristmill, sawmill, hotel and a store.

The area was first built up as a permanent settlement due to the construction of Chelsea Forge, built in 1751, a charcoal-iron forge on the Musconetcong. The forge helped to provide the Continental Army with weapons to defend Valley Forge. The Shank Brothers ran a ferry across the Delaware River from the point where the Musconetcong empties into it prior to 1800. The Fein gristmill burned and was later rebuilt as the Riegel Paper Corporation's paper mill and became the Taylor Stiles and Company knife factory.

The first Finesville Dam on the Musconetcong River was built around 1751 for an iron forge. The last one was a concrete dam built in 1952. This obsolete dam was removed in 2011 to restore migratory fish spawning and improve the river habitat.

== Historic district ==
- Finesville–Seigletown Historic District
- U.S. National Register of Historic Places
- U.S. Historic district
- New Jersey Register of Historic Places
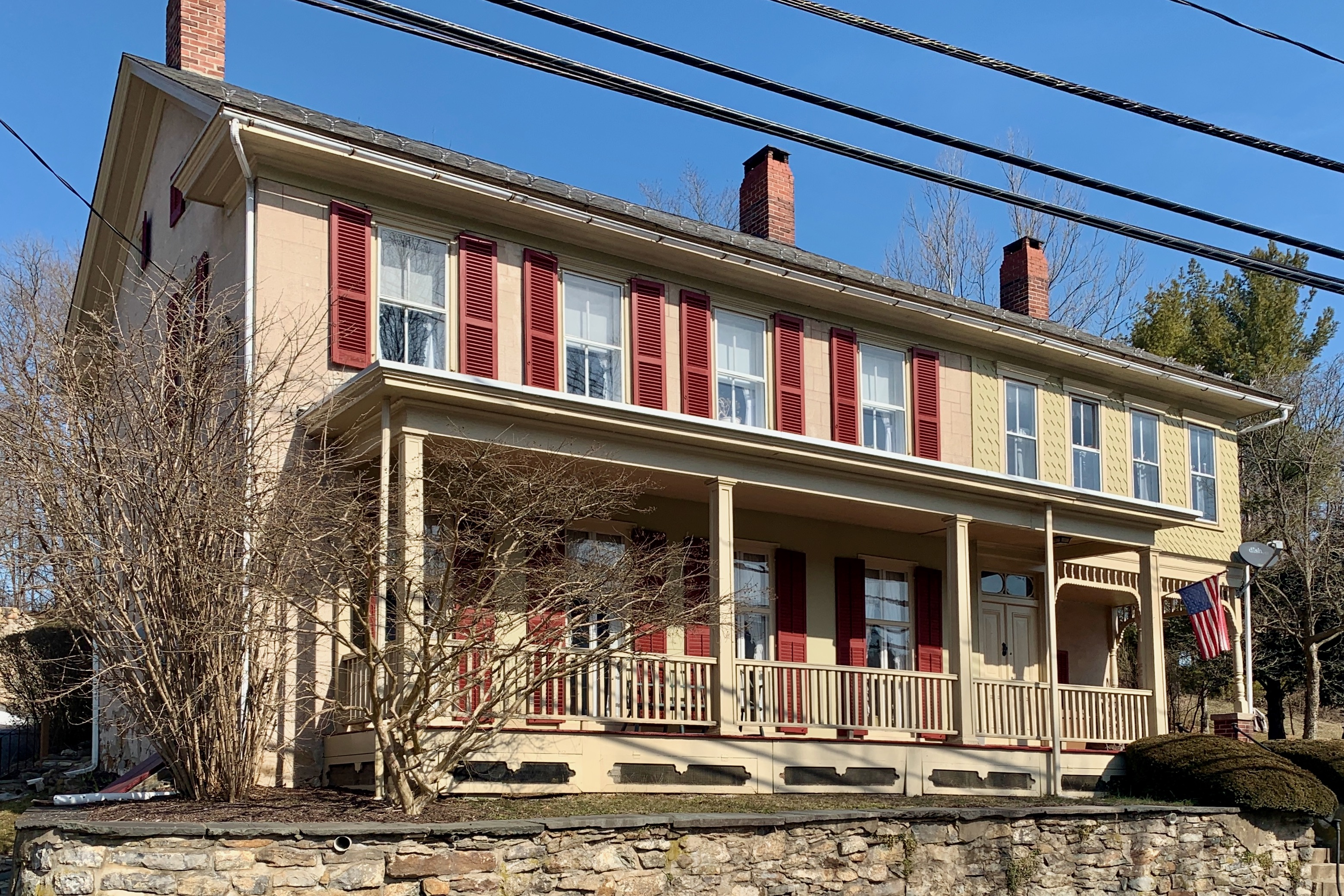
- Finesville Hotel on County Route 627
- Location: County Route 627; Mountain, Musconetcong, Mount Joy and Bellis Roads
- Area: 195 acres (79 ha)
- Architectural style: Early Republic, Late Victorian, multiple styles
- NRHP reference No.: 10000892
- NJRHP No.: 4398

Significant dates
- Added to NRHP: November 10, 2010
- Designated NJRHP: March 4, 2010

The Finesville–Seigletown Historic District is a 195-acre (79 ha) historic district encompassing the community along County Route 627 (Riegelsville-Warren Glen Road); Mountain, Musconetcong, Mount Joy and Bellis roads, and extending into Holland Township, Hunterdon County. It was added to the National Register of Historic Places on November 10, 2010, for its significance in architecture, industry, engineering, and exploration/settlement. The district includes 97 contributing buildings, 6 contributing structures, and 5 contributing sites.

The district includes the Seigle Homestead, listed individually on the NRHP in 1977, and located in the Seigletown section of the community. There are over twenty early stone houses in the community. Many architectural styles are represented, including Colonial Revival, Gothic Revival, Victorian, and Queen Anne.

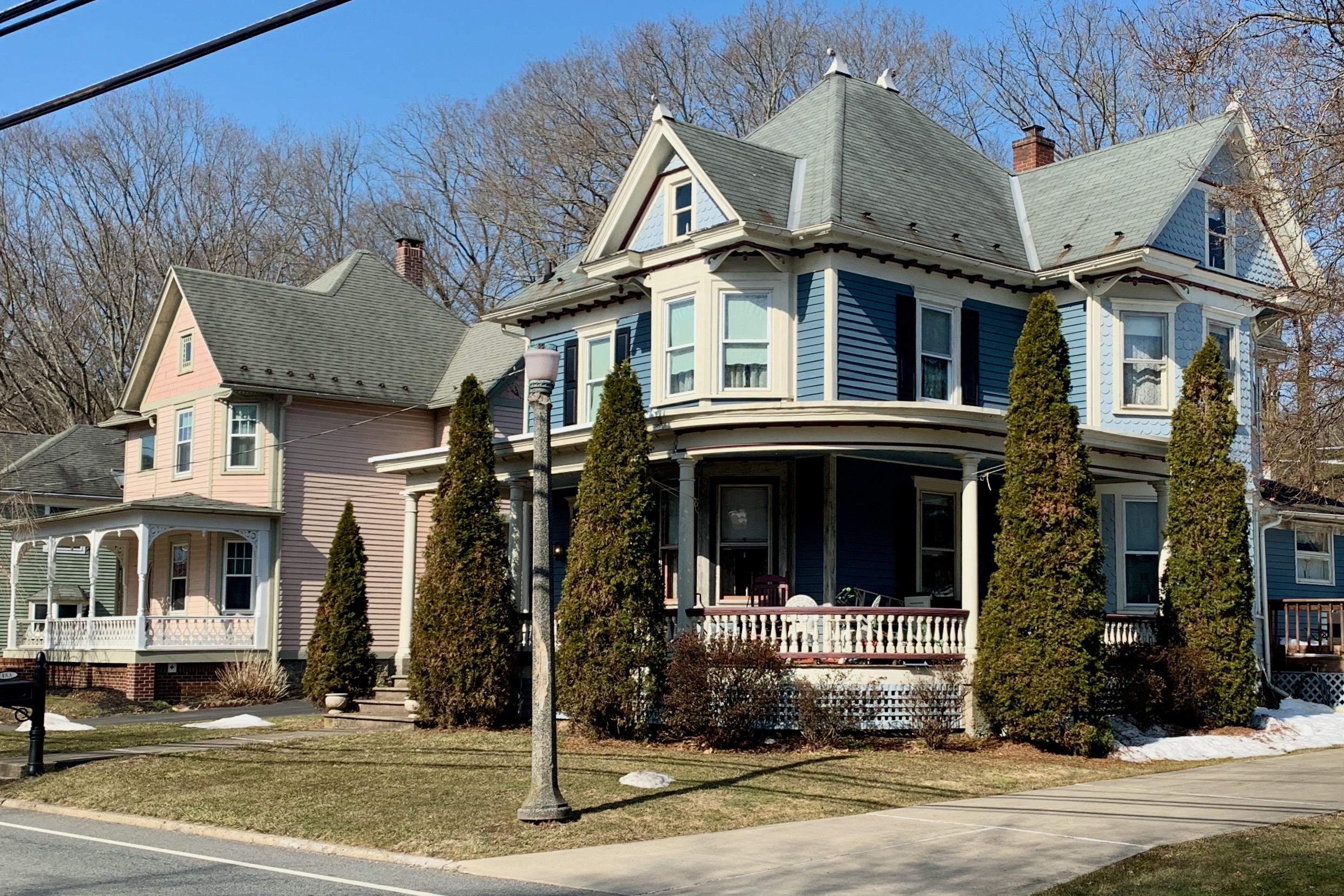
Queen Anne and Colonial Revival houses on County Route 627

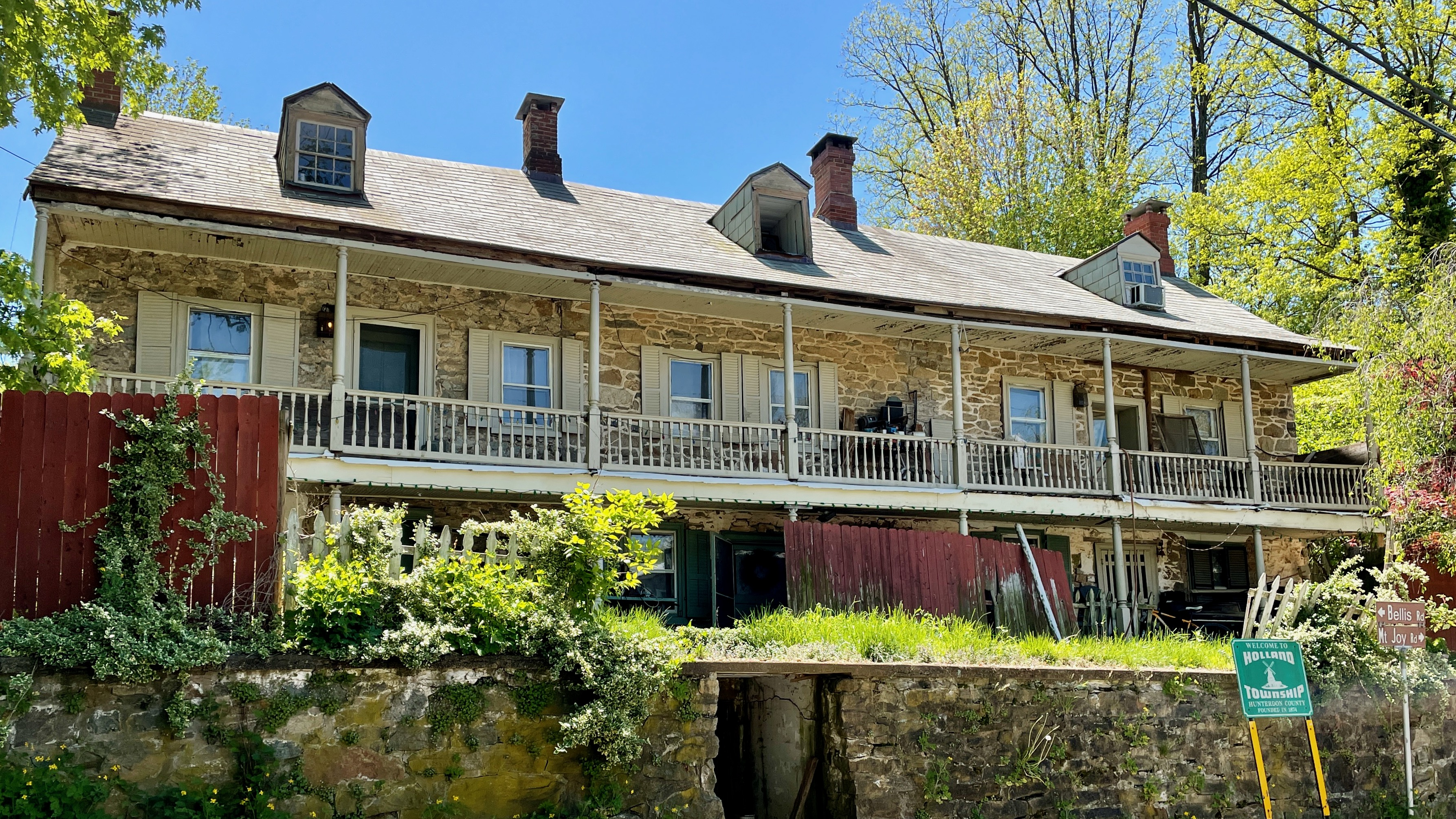
Stone house on Mount Joy Road in Holland Township

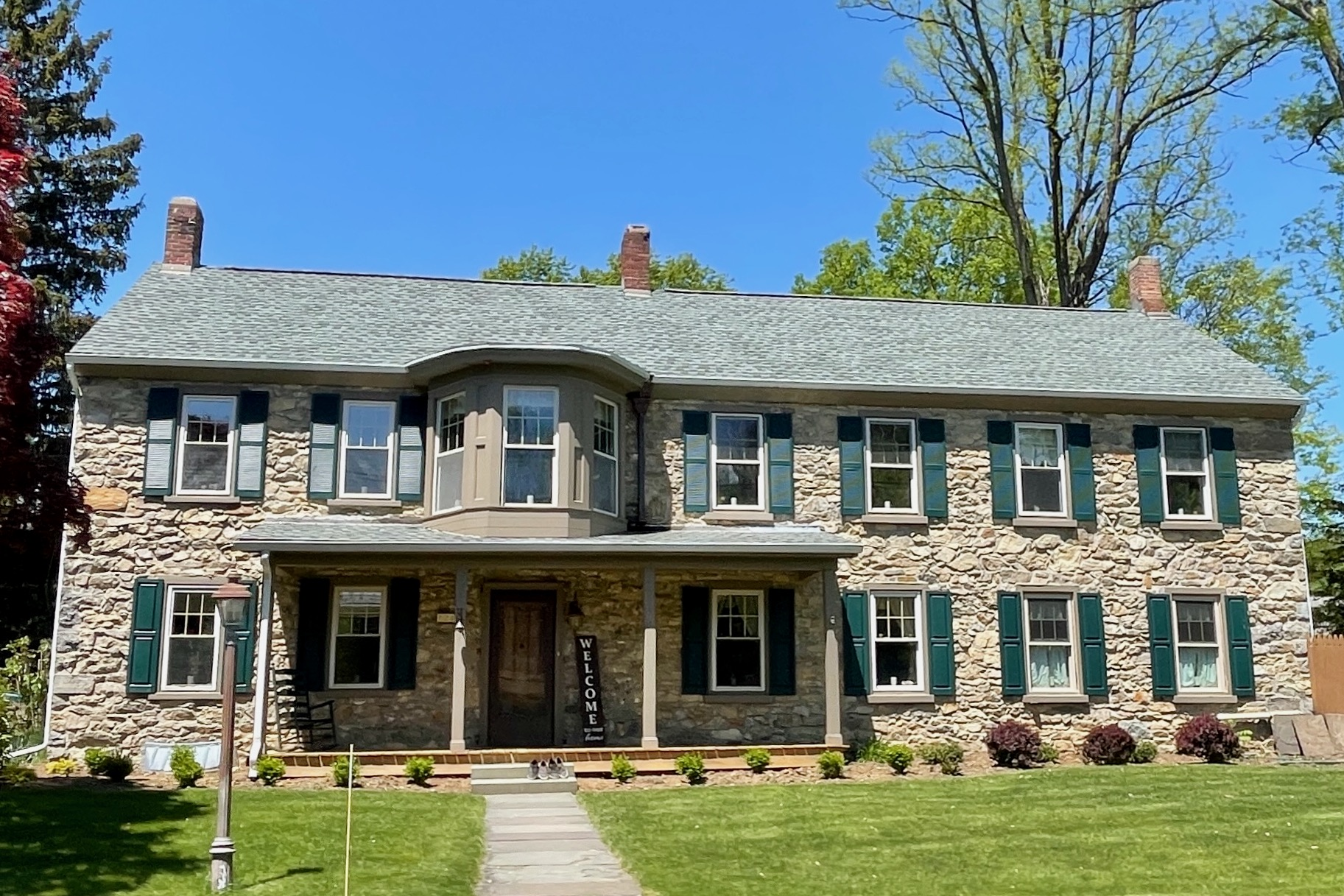
Stone house with Victorian embellishment

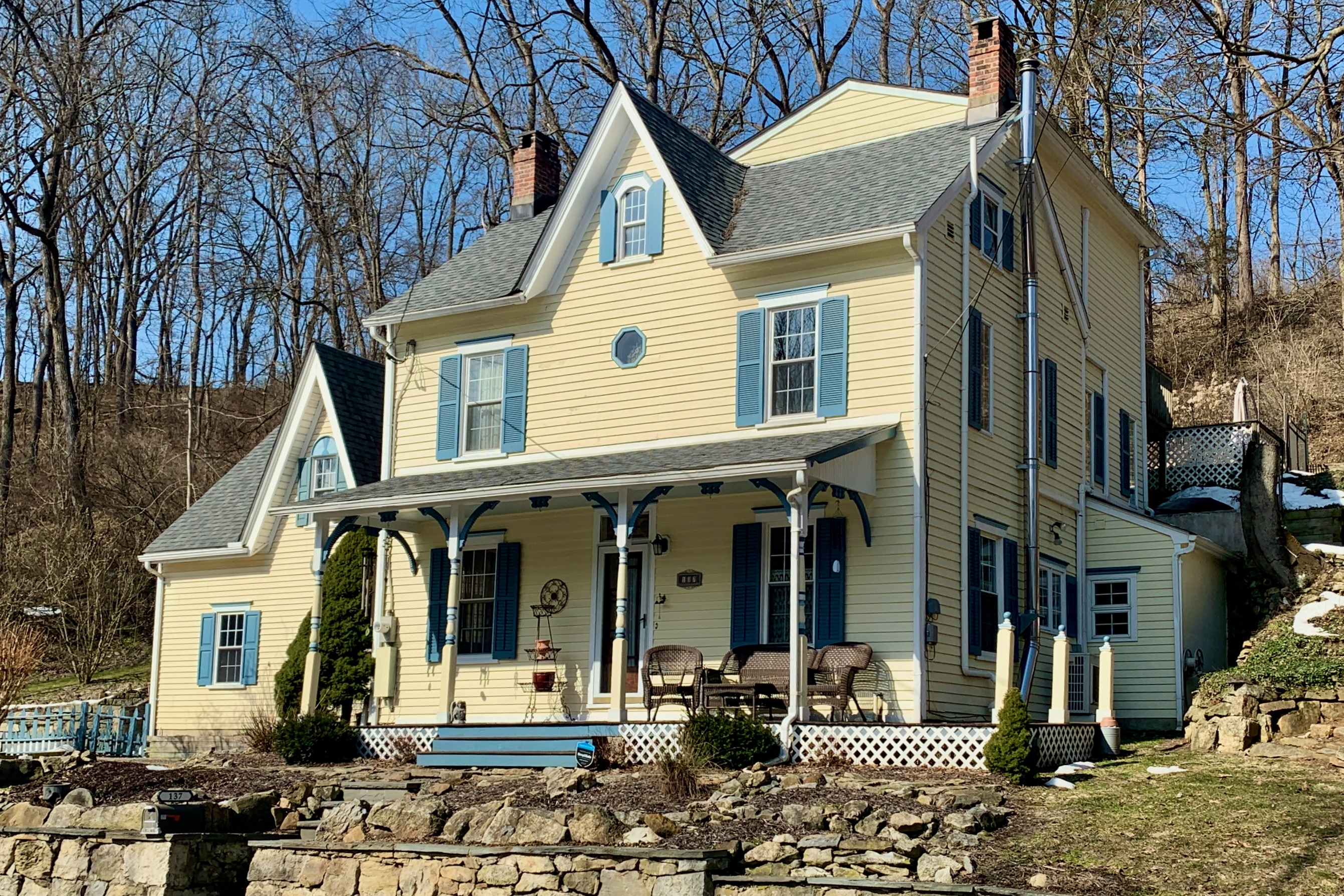
House with Gothic Revival influences

== Geography ==
According to the United States Census Bureau, Finesville had a total area of 0.325 square miles (0.841 km^{2}), all of which was land.

== Demographics ==
Historical population
Census	Pop.	Note	%±
2010	175		—
2020	364		108.0%
U.S. Decennial Census; 2010 2020

Finesville first appeared as a census designated place in the 2010 U.S. census.

=== 2020 census ===
Finesville CDP, New Jersey – Racial and ethnic composition Note: the US Census treats Hispanic/Latino as an ethnic category. This table excludes Latinos from the racial categories and assigns them to a separate category. Hispanics/Latinos may be of any race.
Race / Ethnicity (NH = Non-Hispanic)	Pop 2010	Pop 2020	% 2010	% 2020
White alone (NH)	165	306	94.29%	84.07%
Black or African American alone (NH)	0	1	0.00%	0.27%
Native American or Alaska Native alone (NH)	0	1	0.00%	0.27%
Asian alone (NH)	2	4	1.14%	1.10%
Native Hawaiian or Pacific Islander alone (NH)	0	1	0.00%	0.27%
Other race alone (NH)	1	0	0.57%	0.00%
Mixed race or Multiracial (NH)	2	21	1.14%	5.77%
Hispanic or Latino (any race)	5	30	2.86%	8.24%
Total	175	364	100.00%	100.00%

=== 2010 census ===
The 2010 United States census counted 175 people, 72 households, and 49 families in the CDP. The population density was 538.8 per square mile (208.0/km^{2}). There were 87 housing units at an average density of 267.9 per square mile (103.4/km^{2}). The racial makeup was 97.14% (170) White, 0.00% (0) Black or African American, 0.00% (0) Native American, 1.14% (2) Asian, 0.00% (0) Pacific Islander, 0.57% (1) from other races, and 1.14% (2) from two or more races. Hispanic or Latino of any race were 2.86% (5) of the population.

Of the 72 households, 31.9% had children under the age of 18; 59.7% were married couples living together; 5.6% had a female householder with no husband present and 31.9% were non-families. Of all households, 23.6% were made up of individuals and 5.6% had someone living alone who was 65 years of age or older. The average household size was 2.43 and the average family size was 2.88.

22.9% of the population were under the age of 18, 4.0% from 18 to 24, 25.1% from 25 to 44, 38.3% from 45 to 64, and 9.7% who were 65 years of age or older. The median age was 43.5 years. For every 100 females, the population had 110.8 males. For every 100 females ages 18 and older there were 110.9 males.

== Places of worship ==
The Finesville Church was built in 1877. The Finesville United Methodist Church was built in 1879 and displays Greek Revival influences. Both are contributing properties of the historic district.

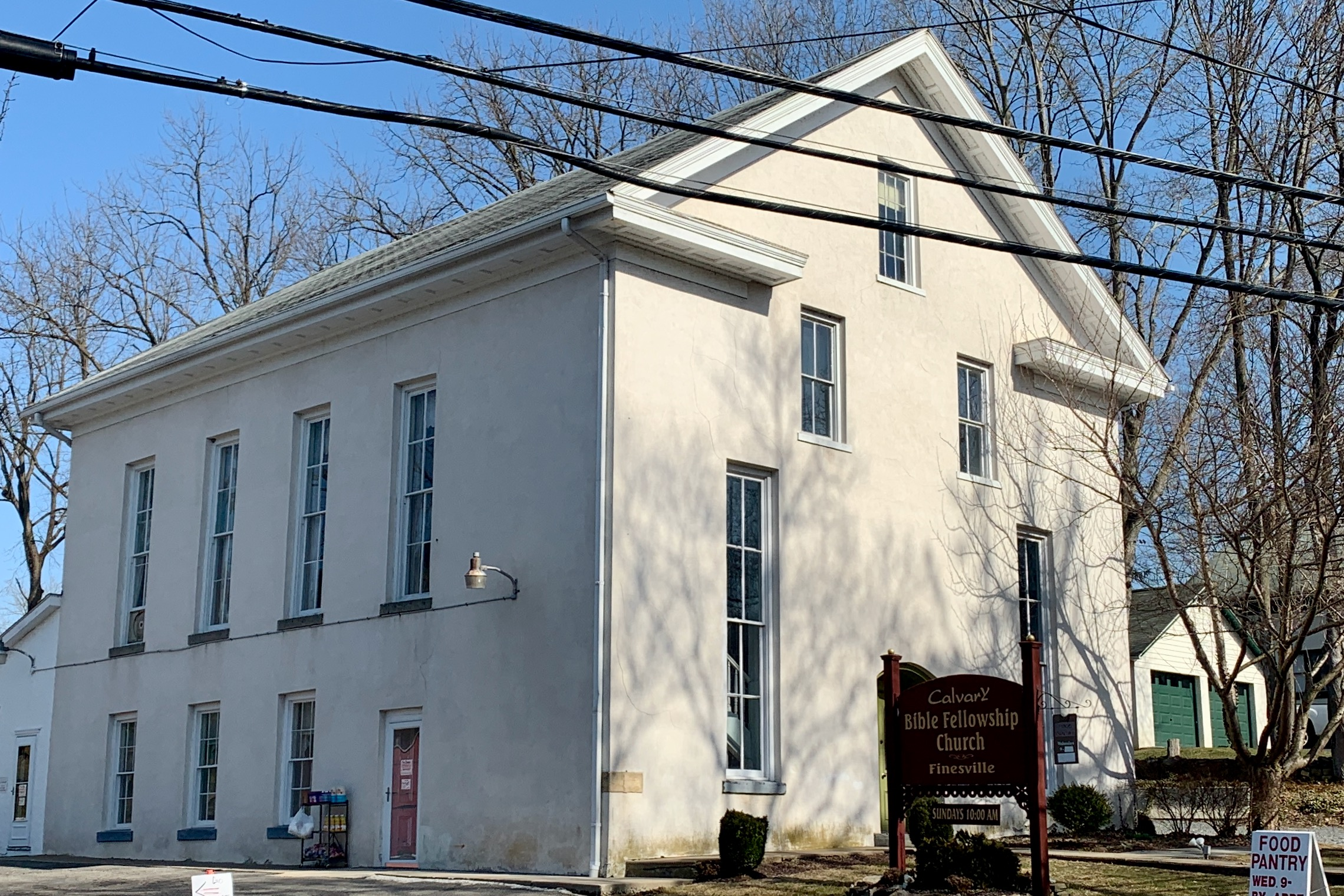
Finesville Church

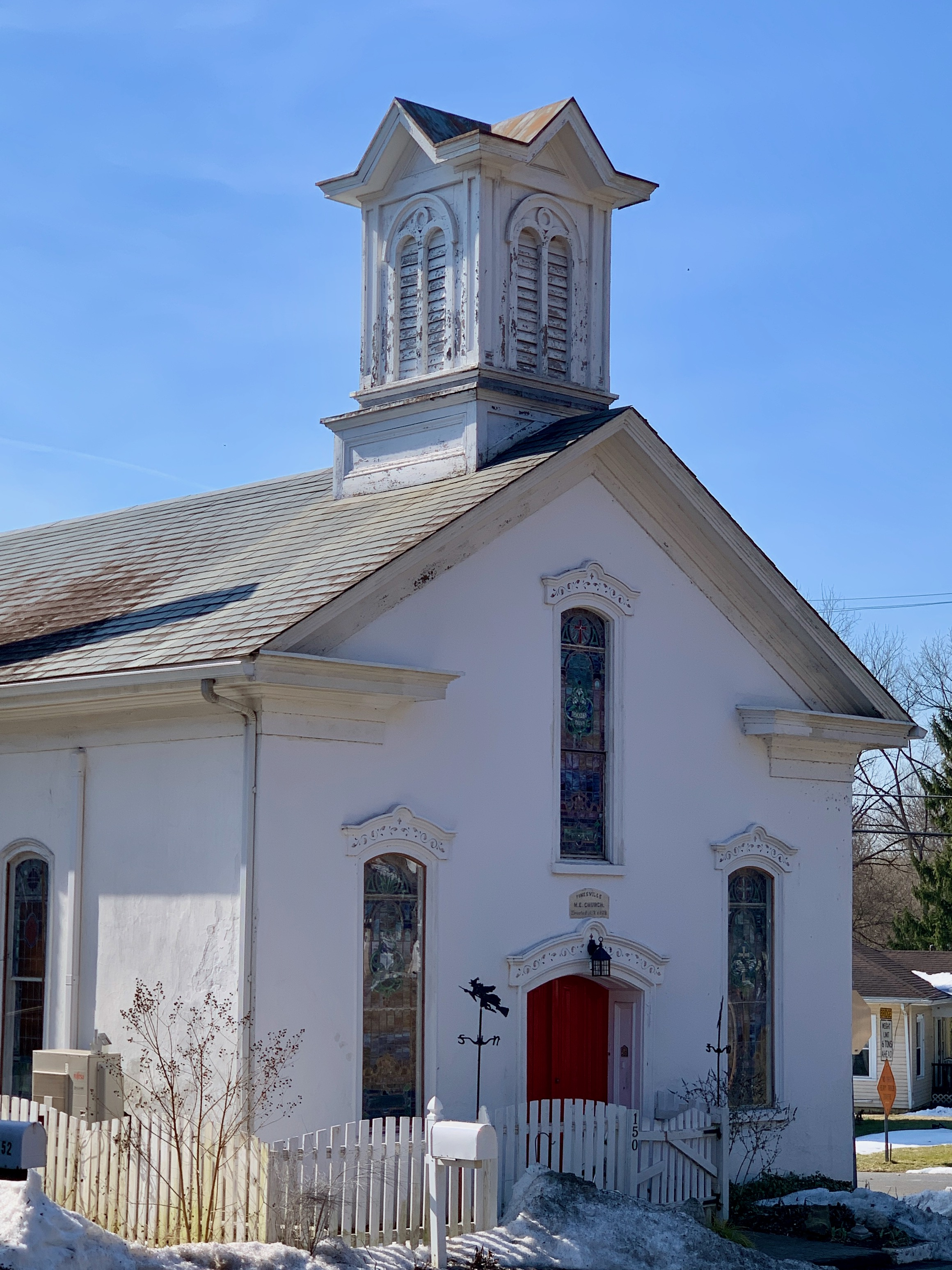
Finesville United Methodist Church

== Transportation ==
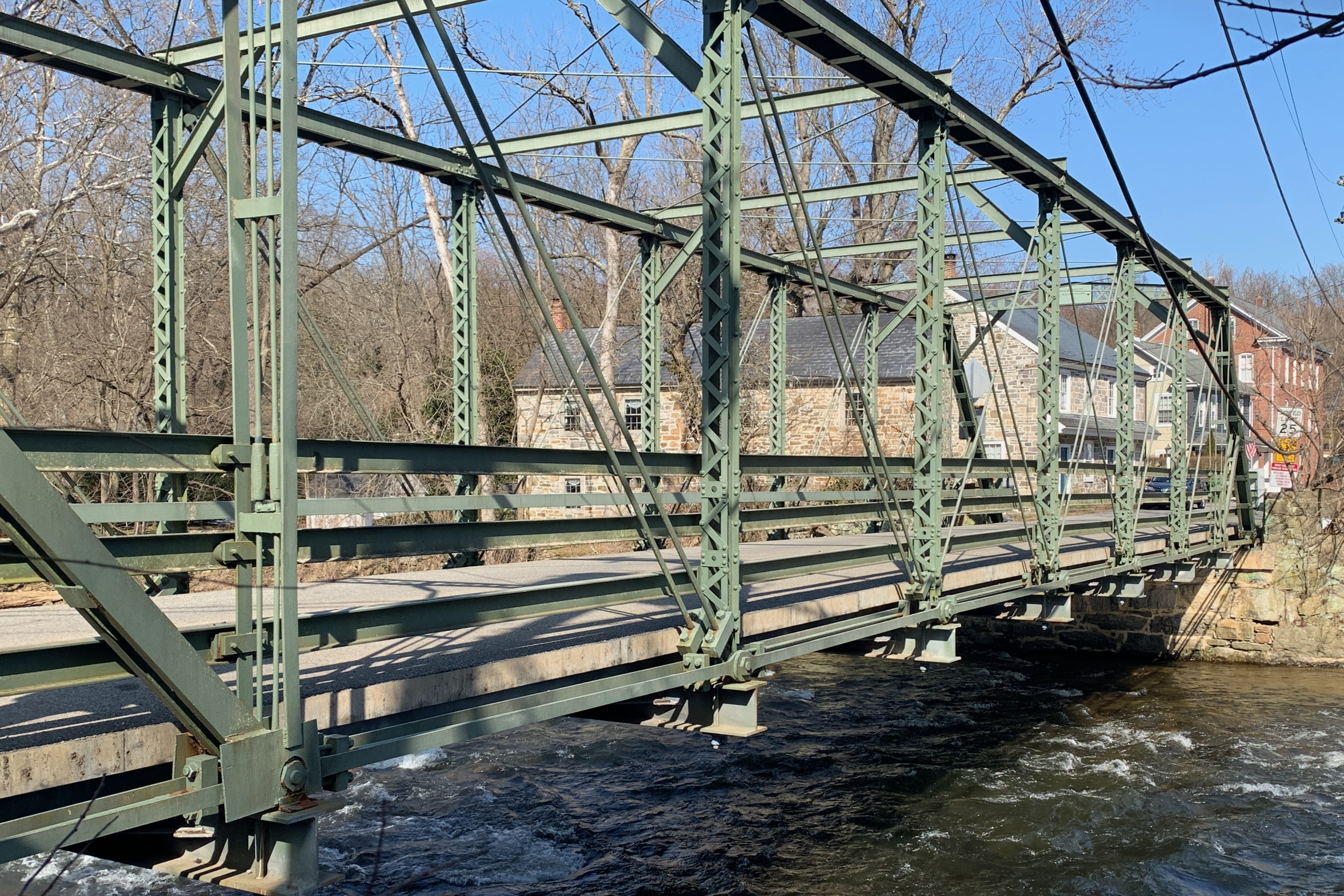
Mount Joy Road Bridge crossing the Musconetcong River

The Mount Joy Road Bridge crosses the Musconetcong River and connects Pohatcong and Holland Townships. This Pratt truss bridge, a contributing structure of the historic district, was built c. 1890 and is the only known example made by G. M. Russling of Hackettstown. County Route 627 (Riegelsville-Warren Glen Road) runs northeast-southwest through the community and intersects with Mountain and Mount Joy Roads.

== Points of interest ==
- Hunts Meadow – named for patriot Edward Hunt who dug the millrace here and wintered sixty cavalry horses for the Continental Army in 1778.
- Seigletown – named for Benjamin Seigle, a Revolutionary militia captain, who lived here and made red clay pottery called Seigleware. The family owned a farm, a gristmill, clovermill, blacksmith shop and hematite mine.

== Wineries ==
- Alba Vineyard
- Villa Milagro Vineyards

== See also ==
- National Register of Historic Places listings in Warren County, New Jersey
