= Delaware wine =

Delaware
- Wine region
- Official name: State of Delaware
- Type: U.S. State Appellation
- Year established: 1787
- Country: United States
- Total area: 1,949 square miles (5,050 km^{2})
- Grapes produced: Cabernet Sauvignon, Chambourcin, Chardonnay, Delaware, Merlot, Seyval blanc, Vidal blanc
- No. of wineries: 2

Delaware wine refers to wine made from grapes grown in the U.S. state of Delaware. Historically, the first Swedish settlers planted grapes and made wine in Delaware as early as 1638.

Delaware has the fewest wineries of any state in the United States. The largest winery is Nassau Valley Vineyards near Lewes, which makes fruit wines in addition to grape wines. Three others are Salted Vines Vineyard & Winery in Frankford, which opened in 2010, Pizzadili Winery near Felton, a small, family business which opened in 2007 and Harvest Ridge Winery near Marydel, which opened in 2013.
