= New Jersey wine =

Wine made from grapes grown in New Jersey, US

New Jersey
- Wine region
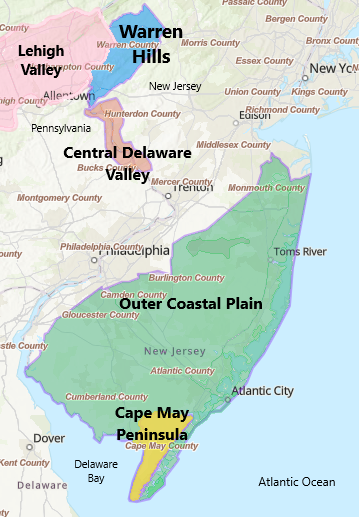
- Official name: State of New Jersey
- Type: U.S. State Appellation
- Year established: 1787
- Years of wine industry: 268
- Country: United States
- Other regions in vicinity: New York, Pennsylvania, Delaware
- Sub-regions: Cape May Peninsula AVA, Central Delaware Valley AVA, Outer Coastal Plain AVA, Warren Hills AVA
- Climate region: Continental and subtropical
- Precipitation (annual average): 40 to 50 in (1,000–1,300 mm)
- Soil conditions: Loam
- Total area: 4.7 million acres (7,354 sq mi)
- Size of planted vineyards: 1,082 acres (438 ha)
- Grapes produced: Albariño, Baco noir, Barbera, Blaufränkisch (Lemberger), Brachetto, Cabernet Franc, Cabernet Sauvignon, Carignan, Catawba, Cayuga White, Chambourcin, Chancellor, Chardonnay, Chenin blanc, Ciliegiolo, Colobel, Colombard, Concord, Corot noir, Corvina, Counoise, De Chaunac, Delaware, Diamond, Dolcetto, Durif (Petite Sirah), Fredonia, Frontenac, Frontenac gris, Gewürztraminer, Geneva Red, Grechetto, Grenache, Grüner Veltliner, Horizon, Ives noir, La Crescent, Lagrein, Lakemont, Landot noir, Léon Millot, Malbec, Malvasia bianca, Marechal Foch, Marquette, Marquis, Marsanne, Merlot, Mourvèdre, Muscat blanc, Muscat of Alexandria, Muscat Ottonel, Nebbiolo, Nero d'Avola, Niagara, Noah, Noiret, Norton (Cynthiana), Orange Muscat, Petit Manseng, Petit Verdot, Pinotage, Pinot blanc, Pinot gris, Pinot noir, Rayon d'Or, Reliance, Riesling, Rkatsiteli, Roussanne, Sagrantino, Sangiovese, Sauvignon blanc, Teroldego, Schiava Grossa, Sémillon, Seyval blanc, St. Laurent, Sumoll, Syrah, Tempranillo, Tinta Cão, Touriga Nacional, Traminette, Trebbiano, Vespolina, Vidal blanc, Vignoles (Ravat 51), Villard blanc, Villard noir, Viognier, Vranec, Zinfandel, and Zweigelt
- No. of wineries: 51

New Jersey wine refers to wine made from grapes grown in the U.S. state appellation of New Jersey. Its viticulture industry has significantly grown since 1981 when the state legislature relaxed Prohibition-era restrictions and enacted new laws to provide further opportunities for winery licenses. Today, New Jersey wineries are crafting wines that have earned recognition for their quality from critics, industry leaders, and in national and international competitions. As of 2018, New Jersey is resident of four designated American Viticultural Areas (AVA); Central Delaware Valley AVA, Warren Hills AVA, Outer Coastal Plain AVA and Cape May Peninsula AVA. As of 2013 New Jersey had 51 licensed and operating wineries with several more prospective wineries in various stages of development. According to the United States Department of Agriculture's 2012 Census of Agriculture, the state's wineries and vineyards dedicated 1,082 acres (438 ha) to the cultivation of grapes. New Jersey wineries are growing Vitis vinifera, Vitis labrusca, or French hybrid wine grapes, and producing or offering for sale over eighty types of wines. In 2010, 1.72 million US gallons (6.5 million litres), or approximately 716,000 cases, of wine were produced by New Jersey wineries; making it the seventh largest wine-producing state in the United States. (Note: With 1.72 million US gallons (6.5 million litres) in 2010, New Jersey was ranked seventh behind (1) California (492 million US gallons (1,860 million litres)), (2) New York (36 million US gallons (140 million litres)), (3) Washington (28.5 million US gallons (108 million litres)), (4) Oregon (3.95 million US gallons (15.0 million litres)), (5) Kentucky and (6) Florida.) A considerable portion of New Jersey wine sales are non-grape fruit wine, particularly apple, blueberry, raspberry, and cranberry wines. These fruits are associated with New Jersey and can be purchased from many nearby farms throughout the Garden State. New Jersey's 51 wineries generate between US$30,000,000-$40,000,000 of revenue annually.

Wealthy New Jersey landowners began to produce wines during the colonial period. In 1767, two men, Edward Antill and William Alexander, Lord Stirling received recognition for their successful efforts to cultivate grapes and produce wine on their plantations from the Royal Society of Arts in London. The Society had challenged colonists in Britain's North American colonies to cultivate grapes and produce "those Sorts of Wines now consumed in Great Britain." While the cultivation of grapes and fruit trees supported a flourishing wine industry in the late nineteenth and early twentieth centuries, the effects of Prohibition (1919-1933) and a legacy of restrictive laws constraining the industry's recovery subsequent to its repeal, practically devastated the industry. For fifty years after the repeal of Prohibition, New Jersey was limited by law to a ratio of one winery license for every 1,000,000 state residents, which by 1980 effectively allowed for only seven wineries. The growth of the state's winery industry has been bolstered by the repeal, starting in 1981, with the New Jersey Farm Winery Act, of many Prohibition-era laws and allowed many small growers to open new wineries.

== Viticulture history ==
=== Colonial period and Early America ===
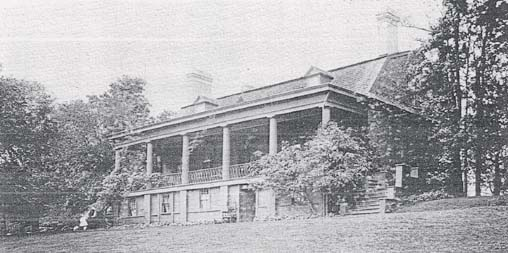
The Georgian-Dutch Colonial home of Edward Antill (later called Ross Hall) in Piscataway built 1739, destroyed 1954. Antill owned a 370-acre plantation with meadows, an orchard, and a vineyard of 800 vines for which he received an award from London's Royal Society of Arts in 1767.

In 1758, the Royal Society of Arts (formally, the "Society instituted at London for the Encouragement of Arts, Manufactures and Commerce") sought to incentivize agricultural innovation and cultivation in the North American colonies by offering a "premium"—or cash award—of 100 British pounds (£100) for the planting of vineyards and the production of "five tuns of red or white wine of acceptable quality." (Note: One tun equals 252 gallons.) The initial award was unclaimed by 1762, and the Society augmented the bounty to £200 if the goal were reached by a colonial farmer by 1770 adding that at least five hundred vines should be planted and the wine produced equal "those Sorts of Wines now consumed in Great Britain."

In 1767, two men had been recognized by the society for their undertakings. William Alexander (1726-1783), the self-styled "Earl of Stirling," informed the society in 1767 that he had planted 2,100 vines at his estate in Basking Ridge, in central New Jersey's Somerset County. Sterling had reported that his plantings were "chiefly Burgundy, Orleans, Black, White and Red Frontiniac, Muscadine, Portugals and Tokays." Edward Antill (1701-1770) who inherited his father's estate and operated a large brewery at Raritan Landing across the Raritan River in Piscataway Township from the city of New Brunswick, advised the society that he had a vineyard of 800 vines of Madeira, Burgundy and Frontinac [sic] grapes as well as a few "Sweet-water Grape vines, and of the best sort of the Native Vines of America by way of tryal." Antill had remarked in a 1765 letter that he had been "thought by some Gentlemen as well as by Farmers, very whimsical in attempting a Vineyard." and had planted his vines "on the south side of a hill facing a public road so that his experiment could be advertised to the skeptics."

The society had discussed offering the £200 to both men for their achievements. However, the Society raised concerns about the legitimacy of Alexander's claim to a title of nobility. On 2 December 1767, the Society offered the cash award to Antill, and three weeks later offered Lord Stirling a gold medal "for having planted 2100 vines in North America in pursuance of the Views of the Society." Shortly after his death, Antill published an 80-page tract entitled An Essay on the cultivation of the Vine, and the making and preserving of Wine, suited to the different Climates in North-America (1771) and this account influenced scholarship well into the nineteenth century.

The developments of Antill and Lord Sterling did not translate into a long-term success or establish the industry in the state. Within a few years after their deaths, Antill in 1770, and Lord Sterling in 1783, their prize-winning vineyards were neglected and gone. In the colonial period and early nineteenth-century, the prevailing market in the New Jersey was for Jersey cider and distilled spirits. During the 1840s, in Newark, producers were creating sparkling apple cider and marketing it as "champagne"—so much so that Scottish traveller Alexander Mackay asserted that he learned that most "imported champagne" in America came in fact from Newark. While Mackay thought that it was "excellent as a summer drink" he quipped that, "many is the American connoisseur of champagne who has his taste cultivated on Newark cider."

=== Flourishing Industry (1860–1920) ===
In the mid-19th century, New Jersey was once again recognized for its suitability for growing grapes. In 1859, an agricultural society was organized in Egg Harbor City and tested over forty different grape varietals for local cultivation. Varietals of Vitis aestivalis and Vitis labrusca were selected, including Concord, Catawba, Norton, and several others. The early industry was started through new German immigrants and by 1865 Gardener's Monthly claimed that these Germans were making wine "as good as any in the world." Prominent vintners from the Egg Harbor City area during this period, who specialized in dry red wines primarily from Norton grapes, included Charles Saalmann and Julius Hincke. Renault Winery, located in the Egg Harbor City section of Atlantic County in the southern region of the state, was established in 1864 by French immigrant Louis Nicolas Renault. In its early years, Renault Winery was known for its American version of "champagne". This was New Jersey's first commercial winemaking operation and remains one of the oldest continuously operating wineries in the United States.

Philadelphia land developer Charles K. Landis (1833–1900) purchased 20,000 acres (8,100 ha) of land in 1861 in Cumberland County near Millville, New Jersey along an existing railroad line to Philadelphia, to create his own alcohol-free utopian society, a "Temperance Town" based on agriculture and progressive thinking. Landis declared that he was "about to build a city, and an agricultural and fruit-growing colony around it." The population reached 5,500 by 1865. Landis determined the potential in growing grapes and named the settlement "Vineland", and advertised to attract Italian grape growers to Vineland, offering 20 acres (8 ha) of land that had to be cleared and used to grow grapes. Relocating to Vineland in 1865, clergyman, inventor and dentist Thomas Bramwell Welch (1825–1903), who developed the method for pasteurizing grape juice to prevent natural fermentation and spoilage in 1869, purchased the locally grown grapes to make "unfermented wine" (or grape juice) that was marketed as "Dr. Welch's Unfermented Wine" and later as Welch's Grape Juice. Welch was an adherent to the Wesleyan Methodist Connexion, which strongly opposed "manufacturing, buying, selling, or using intoxicating liquors." Despite Landis' efforts to create an alcohol-free community, Italian and German immigrants who settled at Vineland started producing alcoholic wine by the 1870s.

=== Prohibition and its legacy (1920–1980) ===
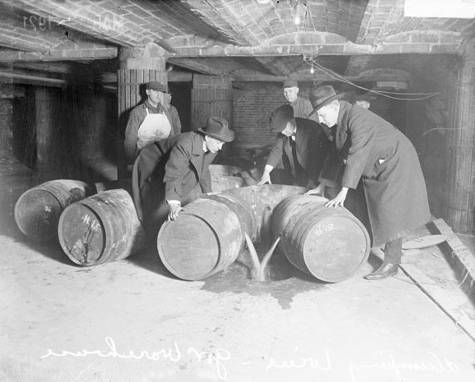
Prohibition agents destroying barrels of alcohol, circa 1921

Prohibition was a major reform movement from the 1840s into the 1920s, and was sponsored by evangelical Protestant churches, especially the Methodists, Baptists, Presbyterians, Disciples and Congregationalists. Groups like the Women's Christian Temperance Union, Prohibition Party, and Anti-Saloon League used pressure politics on legislators to achieve the goal of nationwide prohibition during World War I, emphasizing a need to destroy political corruption, the political power of the German-based brewing industry, and the need to reduce domestic violence in the home and claiming alcohol was the cause. On 16 January 1919, Prohibition was established with the ratification of the Eighteenth Amendment to the United States Constitution prohibiting the "...manufacture, sale, or transportation of intoxicating liquors within, the importation thereof into, or the exportation thereof from the United States..." and Congress subsequently passed the Volstead Act to enforce the law. New Jersey, coincidentally, was the 46th and last state to ratify the Eighteenth Amendment—not doing so until 9 March 1922. Although it was largely unsuccessful, Prohibition would last for 14 years, becoming increasingly unpopular during the Roaring Twenties and the Great Depression. A repeal movement pointed out the hypocrisy of Prohibition activists and politicians, the rise of organised crime, and how it undermined respect for the law. Seeking tax revenue and to weaken the base of organised crime, Franklin Roosevelt and other politicians sought to end prohibition, and did so with the passage of the Twenty-first Amendment to the United States Constitution on 5 December 1933. By its terms, states were allowed to set their own laws for the control of alcohol.

During the Prohibition era (1919-1933), several wineries survived by adopting clever strategies for skirting the law and preserving their businesses. Renault Winery continued producing wine but cleverly marketed it in drugstores and pharmacies as a medicinal "tonic" that doctor's prescribed "liberally for maladies ranging from pregnancy pains to insomnia." The Krumm family's "Seaview Winery" in Linwood chose to sell wine jellies, tonics, cooking wine and sherry which were permitted under Prohibition's Volstead Act (1920).

By the end of Prohibition, the American wine industry which was (as a whole) fledgling, was largely destroyed. What had not survived the spread of Black rot and other grape diseases was severely damaged by Prohibition. Many winemakers had gone out of business, and to comply with the law many vineyard growers replaced productive wine quality grape vines with lower quality vines growing thicker skinned grapes that could be more easily transported as table fruit. Much of the institutional knowledge was also lost as winemakers either emigrated to other wine producing countries or left the business altogether. Only a few wineries emerged from Prohibition. According to Pinney, they included H.T. Dewey, Herman Kluxen, Miele, Renault, Schuster, Tomasello. The Dewey winery (1857) closed in 1952; Herman Kluxen (1865) went out of business in 1974.

=== The Farm Winery Act and the industry's renaissance ===
Wine production within the state remained small until the 1980s when New Jersey began to relax its laws and regulations regarding the licensing and operation of alcoholic beverage production facilities (breweries, wineries, and distilleries). Laws that remained unrepealed after the end of the Prohibition era (1919-1933), prevented the creation of new wineries and limited licensing to one winery for every one million state residents.

In 1981, the state legislature passed the New Jersey Farm Winery Act subsequently signed by Governor Brendan Byrne. which sought to facilitate a rebirth for the state's wine industry by exempting low-volume family-owned wineries from the restrictions, and allowed wineries to create outlet stores. This act effectively allowed anyone with a minimum of three acres and 1,200 vines to apply for a winery license. According to the New York Times, by 1988, the provisions of Farm Winery Act had allowed the industry to grow from 7 wineries to 15, increased the acreage of wine grapes, and the state became the country's tenth largest producer with 204 thousand US gallons (770 thousand litres). Comparatively, New Jersey ranked sixth in the country in per capita consumption of wine, with a total of 27.194 million US gallons (102.94 million litres) drunk in 1986.

In 1985, the state legislature directed the creation of the New Jersey Wine Industry Advisory Council, which serves to advise the state Secretary of Agriculture on production and promotion for the state's wine industry. This council is funded by a per-gallon tax levied on the state's wine producers. The funds are used by each council for product research and improvement, promotional point-of-purchase materials and special promotional events.

In 1999, New Jersey implemented its Quality Wine Alliance (QWA) program modelled after similar rigorous standards in Italy and France. According to this process, a wine "must undergo a review by an independent review board of certified wine judges, wine editors, wine distributors, liquor store owners, and experienced wine reviewers."

On 17 January 2012, New Jersey governor Chris Christie signed into law a bill (S.3172/A.4436) that legalised direct shipping from winery to consumers, and permits state wineries to open as many as 18 offsite retail tasting rooms in the state. The law allows wineries that make less than 250 thousand US gallons (950 thousand litres) of wine annually (a "capacity cap limit") to ship wine to state residents. Because this prohibits 90% of wine made in the United States, but does not affect New Jersey's small wineries, proponents of the law fear that this section of the law will be struck down as unconstitutional. The U.S. Court of Appeals for the First Circuit had struck down a similar limit in Massachusetts in 2008 and the Supreme Court of the United States addressed direct shipping laws a few years earlier.

=== Judgment of Princeton (2012) ===
On June 8, 2012, a blind tasting comparing Chardonnay (white) and Cabernet Sauvignon (red) categories from New Jersey with French Bordeaux and Burgundy vintages took place at Princeton University during a four-day conference of the American Association of Wine Economists (AAWE). It was modeled after the legendary Paris Wine Tasting of 1976, the event where distinguished French oenophiles ranked California vintages higher than historic French labels launching an international revolution expanding the production and prestige of New World viticulture, specifically California. The event was organized by George M. Taber, the sole journalist who attended the Paris event for TIME Magazine, penned the resulting "Judgment of Paris" article, and later wrote a book about it; Princeton University economics professors Orley Ashenfelter and Richard E. Quandt; New York University economics professor and Journal of Wine Economics managing editor Karl Storchmann; and wine shop owner Mark Censits. The event's nine judges consisted of five Americans, three French and one Belgian representing vineyard owners, international wine critics and journalists. Each tasted ten wines where six were New Jersey vintages. The New Jersey wines took three out of the top four spots in the white wine category and ranked third highest in the reds, as event organizers stated that the results were a "statistical tie."

Several critics publicly exposed flaws in the competition comparing weaker vintage French wines making the results statistically meaningless. Indeed, event organizers Ashenfelter and Quandt have published papers criticizing the methods of the 1976 Judgment of Paris and undermining the effectiveness of wine tastings. According to the AAWE, "A statistical evaluation of the tasting...further shows that the rank order of the wines was mostly insignificant. That is, if the wine judges repeated the tasting, the results would most likely be different. From a statistical viewpoint, most wines were undistinguishable."

== Terroir ==
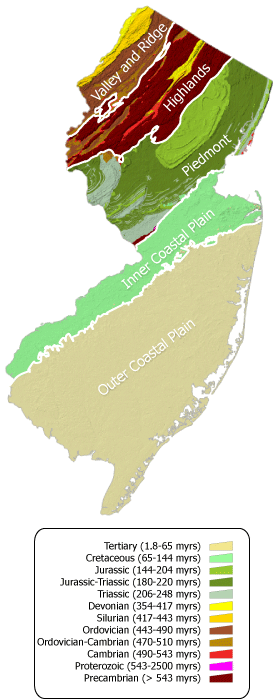
New Jersey's five physiographic provinces

New Jersey is a very geologically and geographically diverse region. Most of the state has a humid mesothermal climate, and southern New Jersey has sandy soils and maritime climate affected by the Atlantic Ocean with longer growing seasons and more sun exposure than the north. Northern New Jersey, especially the northwestern regions of the state, experience a humid continental climate (microthermal)—a cooler climate due to its higher elevations in the mountainous and rocky terrain of the state's northwestern counties that are part of the Appalachian Mountains and the protected New York-New Jersey Highlands region. These northwestern regions of the state have colder winters and a shorter growing season that proves challenging to winegrowers who must consider this in their selecting cold-hardy varietals for cultivation, and in their viticultural practices. The state's five physiographic provinces offer a range of unique terroirs, climates and microclimates for vineyard production that is reflected in the essence of the wine.

=== Geology ===
Geologically, the state offers variety from the Appalachian Mountains and the Highlands in the state's northwest, to the Atlantic Coastal Plain region that encompasses both the Pine Barrens and the Jersey Shore. The state's geological features have impacted the course of settlement, development, commerce and industry over the past four centuries. New Jersey has five distinct physiographic provinces. They are: (listed from the south to the north) the outer and inner Atlantic Coastal Plain Provinces, the Piedmont Province, the Highlands Province, and the Ridge and Valley Province.

Soils in the state vary. In the Atlantic Coastal Plain, fertile, loamy soil makes the land ideal for agriculture and is responsible for New Jersey's nickname of the "Garden State". The majority of the state's wineries are located in this area.

=== Climate ===
Higher elevations of northwestern New Jersey's Appalachian mountains experience a cooler humid continental climate or microthermal climate (Köppen Dfb) which indicates patterns of significant precipitation in all seasons and at least four months where the average temperature rises above 50 °F (10 °C) This differs from the majority of the state, which is generally a humid mesothermal climate, in which temperatures range between 27 and 64 °F (−3 and 18 °C) during the year's coldest month. Sections of southern New Jersey around Delaware Bay and along the Jersey shore experience a humid subtropical climate (Köppen Cfa) characterized by hot, humid summers and generally mild to cool winters. The state average annual precipitation ranges from 40 inches (1,000 mm) along the southeastern coast to around 51 inches (1,300 mm) in the north-central part of the state.

New Jersey lies within USDA Plant Hardiness Zones 6a through 7b, generally increasing in grade from north to south.

== Wine regions ==
Today, 51 wineries are currently in operation in fourteen of the state's 21 counties. Several other wineries are planning to open and are either awaiting the approval of licenses, or in some form of development. Because of favorable sandy soils and warmer climate, a majority of these wineries are located in South Jersey's Outer Coastal Plain AVA, with some wineries also falling within the newly established Cape May Peninsula AVA. A handful of wineries are in northwestern New Jersey's Warren Hills AVA. Part of the Central Delaware Valley AVA is in New Jersey, but no New Jersey wineries are currently in this viticultural area. The four AVAs encompasses nearly 4 million acres (6,200 sq mi; 16,000 km^{2}), over 70%, of the state's 5.6 million acres (8,800 sq mi; 23,000 km^{2}). Some of New Jersey's wineries reside outside of a designated AVA boundaries.

=== Central Delaware Valley AVA ===
Central Delaware Valley American Viticultural Area was the state's initial appellation established by the Bureau of Alcohol, Tobacco and Firearms (ATF), Treasury in 1984 encompassing 96,000 acres (150 sq mi; 390 km^{2}) surrounding the Delaware River in both southeastern Pennsylvania and central New Jersey north of Philadelphia and Trenton, New Jersey. Its southern boundary is near Titusville, New Jersey, just north of Trenton, and its northern border is near Musconetcong Mountain. As of 2019, there are no New Jersey wineries in the Central Delaware Valley AVA.

=== Warren Hills AVA ===
Warren Hills American Viticultural Area was established by ATF in 1988. It encompasses 226 sq mi (144,640 acres; 58,534 ha) entirely within Warren County, New Jersey. This area is historically renown for dairy farming with rolling hills and valleys of the Highlands physiographic province and drained by the Musconetcong River and Delaware River watersheds. Approximately 100 acres (40 ha) are cultivated primarily planted with French hybrid grapes. As of 2019, there are 5 wineries in the Warren Hills.

=== Outer Coastal Plain AVA ===
Outer Coastal Plain American Viticultural Area was established by the Alcohol and Tobacco Tax and Trade Bureau (TTB) in 2007. It consists of most of the southern half of New Jersey, spanning 2,250,000 acres (911,000 ha) across nine counties. This AVA is roughly equivalent to the Outer Coastal Plain physiographic province, including most of the State's Atlantic coastline and the area known as the Pine Barrens. Almost seventy percent (70%) of state grape production is located within this area. According to the 2007 Census of Agriculture, 713 acres (289 ha) of the state's 1,043 acres (422 ha) dedicated to grape production (both wineries and commercial vineyards) were located in the counties that comprise the Outer Coastal Plain—Atlantic County (21 farms, 207 acres (84 ha)), Cape May County (10 farms, 100 acres (40 ha)), Cumberland County (6 farms, 14 acres (5.7 ha)), Camden County (8 farms, 88 acres (36 ha)), Burlington County (12 farms, 86 acres (35 ha)), Gloucester County (10 farms, 48 acres (19 ha)), Monmouth County (23 farms, 40 acres (16 ha)), Ocean County (10 farms, 104 acres (42 ha)), Salem County (5 farms, 26 acres (11 ha)).

This region is known for its high production yields for all crops and is the center of New Jersey's blueberry, cranberry and tomato production. It is characterized by a combination of factors conducive to cultivating grapes, including a climate moderated by the influence of Delaware Bay and the Atlantic Ocean, a growing season extending 190–220 days, and fertile sand and sandy loam soils. This longer growing season and warmer climate allows the region to grow vinifera varieties that are too cold sensitive to be cultivated in the Northeastern United States. As of 2019, 25 of New Jersey's 51 wineries are located within this viticultural area (32 when including the wineries in the Cape May Peninsula AVA, which is entirely contained within the Outer Coastal Plain AVA).

=== Cape May Peninsula AVA ===
Cape May Peninsula American Viticultural Area was established by the TTB in 2018. It consists of approximately 126,635 acres (197.867 sq mi) in Cape May and Cumberland Counties, New Jersey. The viticultural area lies entirely within the established Outer Coastal Plain AVA. As of 2019, there are 7 wineries in the Cape May Peninsula AVA.

== Wine production ==
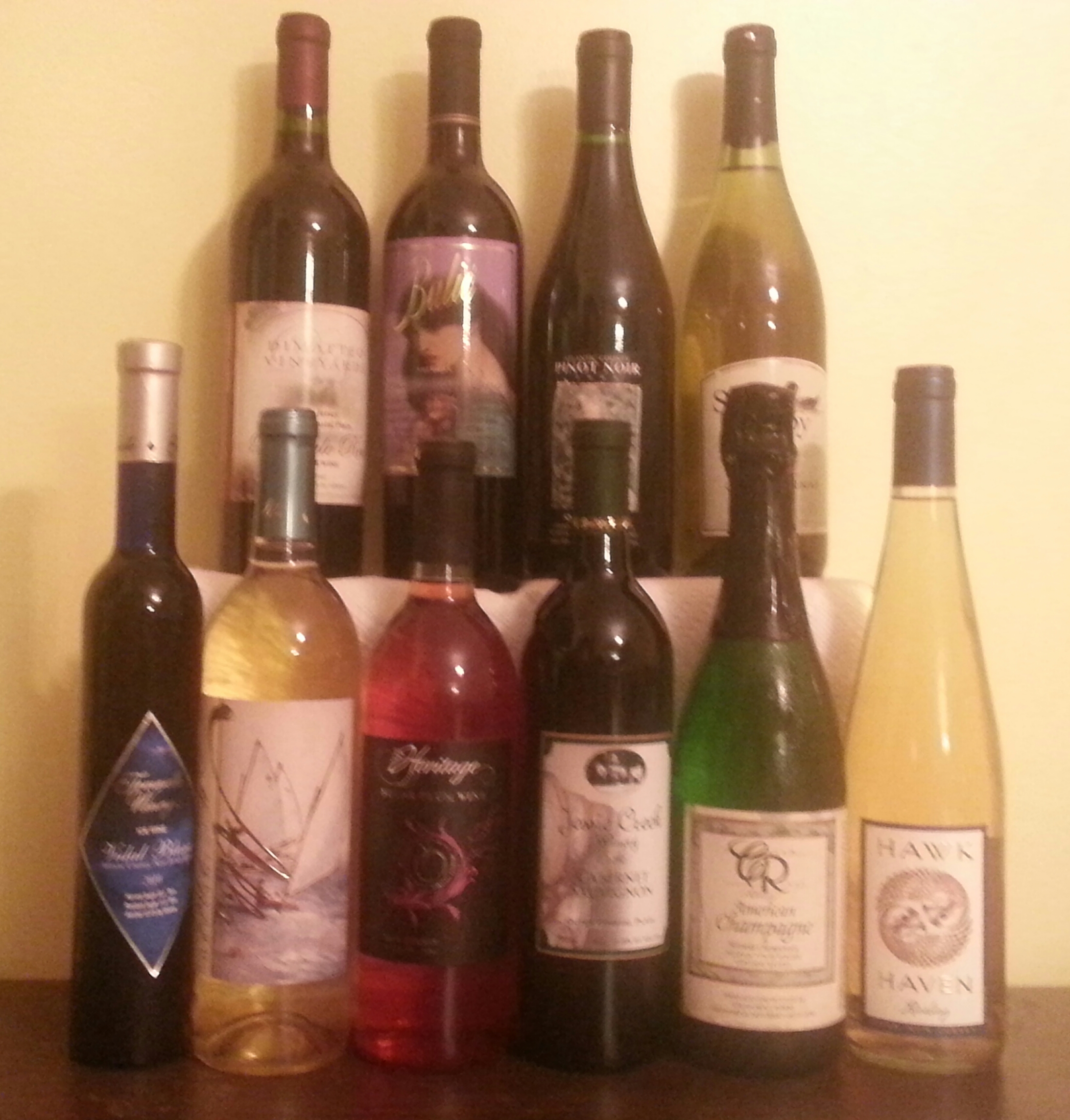
This is an assortment of New Jersey wines. New Jersey's 51 wineries produce wine from more than 90 varieties of grapes, and from over 25 other fruits.

=== Wines produced ===
All common styles of wine—red, rosé, white (dry, semi-sweet and sweet), sparkling and fortified and dessert—are produced in New Jersey. Wineries market products made from more than 90 varieties of grapes including both internationally well-known and obscure local varieties, and from over 25 other fruits.

Other fruit: açaí berries, almonds, apples, apricots, Asian pears, bananas, beach plums, black currants, blackberries, blueberries, cherries, cranberries, dandelions, honey (mead), kiwifruit, limes, mangoes, nectarines, peaches, pears, pineapples, plums, pomegranates, pumpkins, raspberries, strawberries, sugar plums, and watermelons.

=== Industry statistics ===
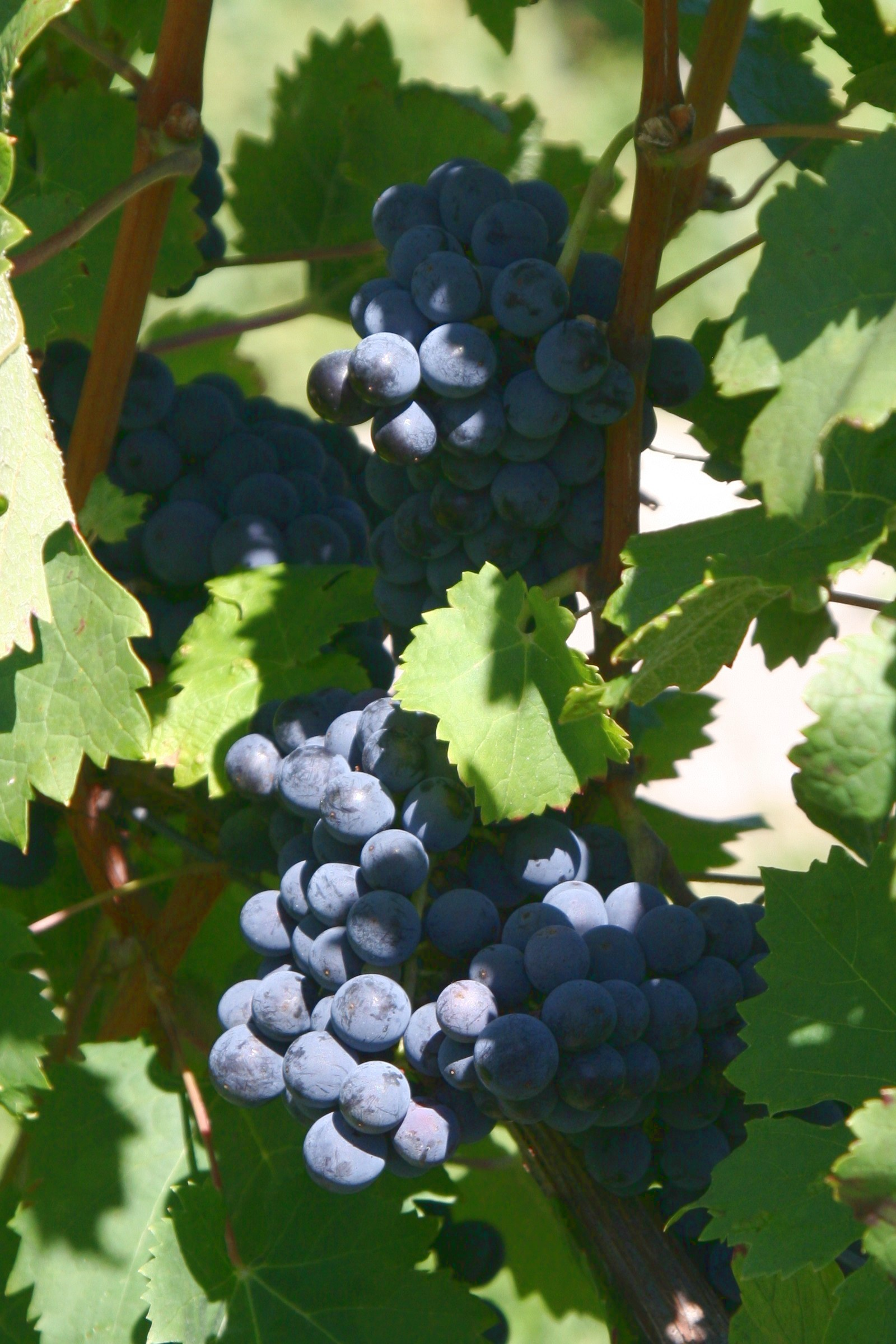
According to the U.S. Department of Commerce, Cabernet Franc (seen here), along with Cabernet Sauvignon and Chambourcin are the red-wine grape varietals most widely grown in New Jersey.

Today, New Jersey is ranked seventh in the nation in total wine production behind California, New York, Washington, Oregon, Kentucky and Florida. However, New Jersey's production is minuscule compared to California's wine industry which produces 89.5% of the country's total production. In 2010, 1.72 million gallons (approximately 716,000 cases) (Note: A case being defined as a standard twelve (12) 750 millilitre bottles (a total of 2.4 gallons).) of wine were produced in the “Garden State”—the most popular red wine varietals grown being Cabernet Sauvignon, Cabernet Franc and Chambourcin and most popular white wine varietals being Chardonnay and Vidal blanc. A considerable portion of New Jersey wine sales are non-grape fruit wines-particularly apple, blueberry, raspberry and cranberry wines—from produce readily identified with New Jersey, and which can be purchased from many nearby farms throughout the Garden State. In 2007, vineyard crop production was valued at $4.7 million in 2007. As of 2013, New Jersey's 48 wineries generate between US$30,000,000-$40,000,000 of revenue annually.

According to Rutgers University and the U.S. Department of Agriculture’s Census of Agriculture, in 2002, 551 acres of New Jersey farmland were dedicated to the cultivation of grapes. By 2007, this had nearly doubled to 1,043 acres. Despite estimates that total acreage might increase by 50%-100% when the 2012 census was released, growth leveled off, with 1,082 acres under cultivation in 2012. As of 2014, New Jersey currently has 48 licensed and operating wineries and several others in development. In 2012, 197 farms in the state were growing grapes to be sold as table grapes and converted into wine and juice production—this was up from 182 in 2002.

== Legal issues ==
=== Winery licenses, taxation, and regulation ===
Wineries in the state of New Jersey must obtain licenses from the Alcohol and Tobacco Tax and Trade Bureau (TTB) of the U.S. Department of the Treasury, and from the New Jersey Division of Alcoholic Beverage Control. New Jersey laws and regulation regarding farm wineries require that a farm cultivate a minimum 3 acres (1.2 ha) of vineyards. Wines, including fortified and sparkling wines, are taxed at 87.5 cents per gallon by the state.

The New Jersey Department of Agriculture has expressed concern that wines made here are increasingly less dependent on grapes grown in the state and that business models are focused on sourcing grapes or juices for winemaking from out-of-state. Their concerns are centered on the credibility and authenticity of a "New Jersey" wine. As a response, they have recommended expanding the number of acres of vineyard production from 3 to 5 acres (1.2 to 2.0 ha) in order to obtain a plenary winery license. Further, the state is looking to certify wineries and permit the marketing of certain wines under its "Jersey Fresh" agriculture program based on their being produced with New Jersey grown grapes.

New Jersey law generally treats hard cider as a type of wine because it is made from fermented fruits. There are currently three licensed hard cider producers in New Jersey. Cider can be produced with a plenary or farm winery license, or with the cidery and meadery license introduced in 2017. Cider with less than 3.2% alcohol by volume is untaxed, cider with 3.2% to 7.0% alcohol is taxed at 15 cents per gallon, and cider with over 7.0% alcohol is taxed at 87.5 cents per gallon.

==== New Jersey Class A manufacturer's licenses for wineries, cideries, and meaderies ====
Type of License	Activity permitted	Fee for license (As of 2019)
Plenary Winery License (2a)	3 acres minimum required; to produce any fermented wines, blend, fortify or treat wines; to sell to wholesalers, directly to retailers, at festivals, or to churches (for religious purposes) in the state; to sell and distribute outside the state; to offer samples to visitors; to sell to consumers on the winery premises; to operate 15 off-premises sales rooms; to direct ship up to 12 cases per year to consumers in or out of state; to maintain a warehouse	Base license: $938; Each offsite salesroom: $250; To sell to retailers: $100 for up to 50,000 gallons per year; $250 for 50,000–100,000 gallons; $500 for 100,000–150,000 gallons; $1,000 for 150,000–250,000 gallons
Farm Winery License (2b)	3 acres minimum required; to produce up to 50,000 gallons of wine per year; requires that a minimum of 51% of grapes or fruit used in production be grown in New Jersey for the first 5 years, and a minimum of 75% thereafter; to sell to wholesalers, directly to retailers, at festivals, or to churches (for religious purposes) in the state; to sell and distribute outside the state; to offer samples to visitors; to sell to consumers on the winery premises; to operate 15 off-premises sales rooms; to direct ship up to 12 cases per year to consumers in or out of state; to maintain a warehouse	Base license: $63 for less than 1,000 gallons per year; $125 for 1,000–2,500 gallons; $250 for 2,500–30,000 gallons; $375 for 30,000–50,000 gallons; Each offsite salesroom: $250; To sell to retailers: $100
Wine Blending License (2c)	to blend, treat, mix, or bottle wines; to sell or distribute to wholesalers or retailers; to maintain a warehouse	Base license: $625
Instructional Winemaking Facility License (2d)	to instruct consumers in winemaking with the opportunity to participate directly in winemaking; to maintain a warehouse	Base license: $1,000
Out-of-State Winery License (2e)	requires a valid winery license in another U.S. state; requires that winery no more than 250,000 gallons produced per year; right to sell and distribute in New Jersey; to operate up to 16 off-site salesrooms; right to ship up to 12 cases per year to consumers in or out of state; right to sell directly to New Jersey retailers	Base license: $938; Each salesroom: $250; To sell to retailers: $100 for up to 50,000 gallons per year; $250 for 50,000–100,000 gallons; $500 for 100,000–150,000 gallons; $1,000 for 150,000–250,000 gallons
Cidery and Meadery License (2f)	to produce up to 50,000 barrels of cider per year; to produce up to 250,000 gallons of mead per year; to sell to wholesalers, directly to retailers, and at festivals in the state; to sell and distribute outside the state; to offer samples to visitors; to offer or sell snacks to visitors, but not to operate a restaurant; to sell to consumers on the premises; to direct ship up to 12 cases of mead per year to consumers in or out of state; cider, like beer, may not be directly shipped to consumers in or out of state; to maintain a warehouse	Base license: $938

== See also ==
- Alcohol laws of New Jersey
- American wine
- Beer in New Jersey
- Garden State Wine Growers Association
- Judgment of Princeton
- New Jersey AVAs
- List of wineries, breweries, and distilleries in New Jersey
- New Jersey distilled spirits
- New Jersey Division of Alcoholic Beverage Control
- New Jersey Farm Winery Act
- New Jersey Wine Industry Advisory Council
- Oenology
- Viticulture
